= List of Japanese films of 2018 =

A list of Japanese films that were first released in 2018.

== Highest-grossing films ==
The following is a list of the top 10 highest-grossing Japanese films released at the Japanese box office in 2018.

Rank	Title	Gross
1	Code Blue	¥9.30 billion ($84.22 million)
2	Detective Conan: Zero the Enforcer	¥9.18 billion ($83.13 million)
3	Doraemon the Movie: Nobita's Treasure Island	¥5.37 billion ($48.63 million)
4	Shoplifters	¥4.55 billion ($41.21 million)
5	Gintama 2	¥3.70 billion ($55.2 million)
6	Destiny: The Tale of Kamakura	¥3.21 billion ($29.07 million)
7	One Cut of the Dead	¥3.12 billion ($28.25 million)
8	Pokémon the Movie: The Power of Us	¥3.09 billion ($27.98 million)
9	Killing for the Prosecution	¥2.96 billion ($26.81 million)
10	Mirai	¥2.88 billion ($26.08 million)

== Film releases ==
=== January – March ===
Opening		Title	Director	Cast	Ref(s)
J A N U A R Y	5	We Make Antiques!	Masaharu Take	Kiichi Nakai, Kuranosuke Sasaki	
J A N U A R Y	6	Love, Chunibyo & Other Delusions! Take on Me	Tatsuya Ishihara	Jun Fukuyama, Maaya Uchida, Azumi Asakura, Chinatsu Akasaki, Sumire Uesaka, Juri Nagatsuma	
J A N U A R Y	6	Garo: Kami no Kiba	Keita Amemiya	Wataru Kuriyama, Junya Ikeda, Tsunenori Aoki	
J A N U A R Y	13	Attack on Titan: The Roar of Awakening	Tetsurō Araki, Masashi Koizuka	Yūki Kaji, Yui Ishikawa, Marina Inoue, Hiro Shimono	
J A N U A R Y	13	Mazinger Z: Infinity	Keita Amemiya	Wataru Kuriyama, Junya Ikeda, Tsunenori Aoki	
J A N U A R Y	13	Evil and the Mask	Teppei Nakamura	Hiroshi Tamaki, Yuko Araki, Ryo Yoshizawa, Tatsuya Nakamura	
J A N U A R Y	19	Saki Achiga-hen episode of Side-A	Yuichi Onuma	Hiyori Sakurada, Momoka Ito, Yuri Tsunematsu, Kōme Watanabe, Riko Nakayama, Nao Minamisawa	
J A N U A R Y	19	The Lies She Loved	Kazuhito Nakae	Masami Nagasawa, Issey Takahashi, Daigo, Rina Kawaei, Maho Nonami, Eriko Hatsune	
J A N U A R Y	26	Colours of Wind	Kwak Jae-yong	Yuki Furukawa, Takemi Fujii, Tomoya Ishii, Yoshihiko Hakamada, Mantaro Koichi, Yoshiko Nakada	
J A N U A R Y	26	The Crimes That Bind	Katsuo Fukuzawa	Hiroshi Abe, Nanako Matsushima, Junpei Mizobata, Rena Tanaka, Erina Mano	
F E B R U A R Y	2	Impossibility Defense	Kōji Shiraishi	Tori Matsuzaka, Erika Sawajiri, Mackenyu, Shotaro Mamiya, Tet Wada, Tetsuya Sugaya	
F E B R U A R Y	3	The Scythian Lamb	Daihachi Yoshida	Ryo Nishikido, Fumino Kimura, Yuka, Kazuki Kitamura, Mikako Ichikawa, Shingo Mizusawa	
F E B R U A R Y	9	Macross Delta the Movie: Passionate Walkūre	Kenji Yasuda	Yuuma Uchida, Minori Suzuki, Asami Seto, Ami Koshimizu, Kiyono Yasuno, Nao Tōyama	
F E B R U A R Y	10	Color Me True	Hideki Takeuchi	Haruka Ayase, Kentaro Sakaguchi, Tsubasa Honda, Kazuki Kitamura, Akiyoshi Nakao, Anna Ishibashi	
F E B R U A R Y	10	Code Geass Lelouch of the Resurrection the Movie: Rebellion Path	Gorō Taniguchi	Jun Fukuyama, Takahiro Sakurai, Yukana, Ami Koshimizu, Kaori Nazuka, Fumiko Orikasa	
F E B R U A R Y	16	River's Edge	Isao Yukisada	Fumi Nikaidō, Ryo Yoshizawa, Shuhei Uesugi, Sumire, Shiori Doi, Aoi Morikawa	
F E B R U A R Y	17	Sunny 32	Kazuya Shiraishi	Pierre Taki, Rie Kitahara, Mugi Kadowaki, Lily Franky, Taro Suruga, Takuma Otoo	
F E B R U A R Y	17	Dharuriser the Movie	Katsunori Sato	Takeaki Wachi, Kunihiko Ida, Taro Yamaguchi	
F E B R U A R Y	24	Maquia: When the Promised Flower Blooms	Mari Okada	Manaka Iwami, Miyu Irino, Ai Kayano, Yūki Kaji	
F E B R U A R Y	24	Infini-T Force	Jun Matsumoto	Ai Kayano, Kenichi Suzumura, Atsushi Ono, Tomokazu Seki, Takahiro Sakurai, Soma Saito	
M A R C H	3	Principal!	Tetsuo Shinohara	Yuina Kuroshima, Nozomu Kotaki, Mahiro Takasugi, Rina Kawaei, Mitsuki Tanimura	
M A R C H	3	Bungo Stray Dogs: Dead Apple	Takuya Igarashi	Yūto Uemura, Mamoru Miyano, Yoshimasa Hosoya, Toshiyuki Toyonaga	
M A R C H	3	Doraemon the Movie: Nobita's Treasure Island	Kazuaki Imai	Wasabi Mizuta, Megumi Ohara, Yumi Kakazu, Subaru Kimura, Tomokazu Seki	
M A R C H	10	Kids on the Slope	Takahiro Miki	Yuri Chinen, Taishi Nakagawa, Nana Komatsu, Erina Mano	
M A R C H	10	Last Winter, We Parted	Tomoyuki Takimoto	Takanori Iwata, Mizuki Yamamoto, Takumi Saito, Reina Asami, Kaho Tsuchimura, Kazuki Kitamura	
M A R C H	10	Sakura Guardian in the North	Yōjirō Takita	Sayuri Yoshinaga, Masato Sakai, Ryoko Shinohara, Ittoku Kishibe, Reiko Takashima, Toshiyuki Nagashima	
M A R C H	10	Ultraman Geed The Movie: Connect the Wishes!	Koichi Sakamoto	Tatsuomi Hamada, Chihiro Yamamoto, Mayu Hasegawa, Hideyoshi Iwata, Yûta Ozawa, Yuika Motokariya	
M A R C H	17	Chihayafuru Part 3	Norihiro Koizumi	Suzu Hirose, Shuhei Nomura, Mackenyu, Mone Kamishiraishi	
M A R C H	17	Pretty Cure Superstars!	Yoko Ikeda	Rie Hikisaka, Rina Honnizumi, Yui Ogura, Konomi Tada	
M A R C H	21	Laughing Under the Clouds	Katsuyuki Motohiro	Sota Fukushi, Yuma Nakayama, Yuki Furukawa, Renn Kiriyama	
M A R C H	30	Honey So Sweet	Kōji Shintoku	Sho Hirano, Yuna Taira, Ryusei Yokohama, Kaho Mizutani	

=== April - June ===
Opening		Title	Director	Cast	Ref(s)
A P R I L	6	The Bastard and the Beautiful World	Various	Sion Sono, Kenji Yamauchi, Hikari Ōta, Yuichi Kodama	
A P R I L	7	Servamp: Alice in the Garden	Hideaki Nakano	Takuma Terashima, Yūki Kaji, Hiro Shimono, Kazuma Horie	
A P R I L	13	Detective Conan: Zero the Enforcer	Tachikawa Yuzuru	Minami Takayama, Wakana Yamazaki, Rikiya Koyama, Tōru Furuya	
A P R I L	13	Crayon Shin-chan: Burst Serving! Kung Fu Boys ~Ramen Rebellion~	Wataru Takahashi	Akiko Yajima, Miki Narahashi, Toshiyuki Morikawa, Satomi Kōrogi, Mari Mashiba, Tamao Hayashi	
A P R I L	20	Inuysashiki	Shinsuke Sato	Noritake Kinashi, Takeru Satoh, Fumi Nikaidō, Kanata Hongō	
A P R I L	27	Batman Ninja	Junpei Mizusaki	Kōichi Yamadera, Wataru Takagi, Ai Kakuma, Roger Craig Smith, Tony Hale, Grey DeLisle	
A P R I L	27	My Little Monster	Sho Tsukikawa	Masaki Suda, Tao Tsuchiya, Yuki Furukawa, Yuki Yamada, Elaiza Ikeda	
A P R I L	27	Marmalade Boy	Ryūichi Hiroki	Hinako Sakurai, Ryo Yoshizawa, Miho Nakayama, Rei Dan	
M A Y	4	Laplace's Witch	Takashi Miike	Sho Sakurai, Suzu Hirose, Sota Fukushi, Tao Okamoto, Masanobu Takashima, Mirai Shida	
M A Y	5	PriPara and Kiratto Pri Chan the Movie!	Nobutaka Yoda	Coco Hayashi, Miyu Kubota, Nanami Atsugi, Himika Akaneya	
M A Y	11	Love × Doc	Osamu Suzuki	Yō Yoshida, Shuhei Nomura, Kayoko Okubo, Atsushi Shinohara	
M A Y	12	Last Hold!	Yukinori Makabe	Ryoichi Tsukada, Iwamoto Hikaru, Tatsuya Fukasawa, Shōta Watanabe	
M A Y	12	The Blood of Wolves	Kazuya Shiraishi	Kōji Yakusho, Tori Matsuzaka, Yōko Maki, Kenichi Takito	
M A Y	18	Nomitori Zamurai	Yasuo Tsuruhashi	Hiroshi Abe, Shinobu Terajima, Etsushi Toyokawa, Takumi Saito	
M A Y	18	Godzilla: City on the Edge of Battle	Hiroyuki Seshita, Kōbun Shizuno	Mamoru Miyano, Takahiro Sakurai, Tomokazu Sugita, Junichi Suwabe	
M A Y	19	Kamen Rider Amazons the Movie: The Last Judgement	Hidenori Ishida	Tom Fujita, Masashi Taniguchi, Rena Takeda, Ayu Higashi, Mitsutoshi Shundo	
M A Y	25	What a Wonderful Family 3!	Yoji Yamada	Isao Hashizume, Kazuko Yoshiyuki, Masahiko Nishimura, Yui Natsukawa	
M A Y	25	My Friend: A	Takahisa Zeze	Toma Ikuta, Eita, Kōichi Satō, Kaho	
M A Y	25	After the Rain	Akira Nagai	Nana Komatsu, Yo Oizumi, Nana Seino, Hayato Isomura, Shono Hayama	
M A Y	26	Code Geass Lelouch of the Resurrection the Movie: Imperial Path	Gorō Taniguchi	Jun Fukuyama, Takahiro Sakurai, Yukana, Ami Koshimizu	
M A Y	26	My Brother's Friend	Ryo Nakajima	Ryusei Yokohama, Risa Matsukaze, Kōdai Matsuoka, Tsuyoshi Furukawa	
J U N E	1	Over Drive	Eiichirō Hasumi	Masahiro Higashide, Mackenyu, Aoi Morikawa, Takumi Kitamura, Keita Machida	
J U N E	1	50 First Kiss	Yuichi Fukuda	Takayuki Yamada, Masami Nagasawa, Tsuyoshi Muro, Katsuya	
J U N E	2	Peacemaker Kurogane	Hiroshi Takeuchi	Yūki Kaji, Yumiko Kobayashi, Jouji Nakata, Mitsuki Saiga	
J U N E	8	A Forest of Wool and Steel	Kōjirō Hashimoto	Kento Yamazaki, Mone Kamishiraishi, Tomokazu Miura, Moka Kamishiraishi	
J U N E	8	Shoplifters	Hirokazu Kore-eda	Lily Franky, Sakura Ando, Mayu Matsuoka, Kairi Jo, Sosuke Ikematsu, Kirin Kiki	
J U N E	9	Life in Overtime	Hideo Nakata	Hiroshi Tachi, Hitomi Kuroki, Ryōko Hirosue, Asami Usuda	
J U N E	15	Recall	Katsuhide Motoki	Tomoya Nagase, Dean Fujioka, Issey Takahashi, Kyoko Fukada	
J U N E	22	Yakiniku Dragon	Wui Shin Chong	Yōko Maki, Mao Inoue, Yo Oizumi, Nanami Sakuraba	
J U N E	23	One Cut of the Dead	Shinichiro Ueda	Takayuki Hamatsu, Mao, Harumi Syuhama, Yuzuki Akiyama	
J U N E	23	The Cat in His Arms	Isshin Inudo	Erika Sawajiri, Ryo Yoshizawa, Kazunobu Mineta, KOM_I	
J U N E	23	Missions of Love	Toru Yamamoto	Tina Tamashiro, Yuta Koseki, Kanta Sato, Anna Yamada	
J U N E	30	Punk Samurai Slash Down!	Gakuryū Ishii	Gō Ayano, Keiko Kitagawa, Masahiro Higashide, Shōta Sometani	

=== July - September ===
Opening		Title	Director	Cast	Ref(s)
J U L Y	6	Rainbow Days	Ken Iizuka	Reo Sano, Taishi Nakagawa, Mahiro Takasugi, Ryusei Yokohama	
J U L Y	7	You, Your, Yours	Daigo Matsui	Sosuke Ikematsu, Kim Kkot-bi, Shinnosuke Mitsushima, Koji Okura	
J U L Y	13	Pokémon the Movie: The Power of Us	Tetsuo Yajima	Rica Matsumoto, Ikue Ōtani, Megumi Hayashibara, Shinichiro Miki	
J U L Y	20	Bleach	Shinsuke Sato	Sota Fukushi, Hana Sugisaki, Ryo Yoshizawa, Taichi Saotome	
J U L Y	20	Mirai	Mamoru Hosoda	Moka Kamishiraishi, Haru Kuroki, Gen Hoshino, Kumiko Asō	
J U L Y	27	Code BLUE The Movie	Masaki Nishimura	Tomohisa Yamashita, Yui Aragaki, Erika Toda, Manami Higa, Ryo Narita, Yuko Araki, Fumika Baba, Mackenyu	
A U G U S T	1	Sensei Kunshu	Sho Tsukikawa	Ryoma Takeuchi, Minami Hamabe, Taiki Sato, Rina Kawaei	
A U G U S T	1	Ao-Natsu: Blue Summer	Takeshi Furusawa	Wakana Aoi, Hayato Sano, Seika Furuhata, Takumi Kizu	
A U G U S T	3	My Hero Academia: Two Heroes	Kenji Nagasaki	Daiki Yamashita, Kenta Miyake, Nobuhiko Okamoto, Ayane Sakura	
A U G U S T	4	Kamen Rider Build the Movie: Be The One	Kazuya Kamihoriuchi	Atsuhiro Inukai, Eiji Akaso, Kouhei Takeda, Kaho Takada, Yuki Ochi, Yukari Taki, Yukiaki Kiyama	
A U G U S T	10	Flavors of Youth	Li Haoling, Jiaoshou Yi Xiaoxing, Yoshitaka Takeuchi	Taito Ban, Mariya Ise, Sayuri Sadaoka, Minako Kotobuki	
A U G U S T	17	Penguin Highway	Hiroyasu Ishida	Kana Kita, Yū Aoi, Rie Kugimiya, Megumi Han	
A U G U S T	17	Gintama 2	Yuichi Fukuda	Shun Oguri, Masaki Suda, Kanna Hashimoto, Yūya Yagira, Haruma Miura, Masataka Kubota, Ryo Yoshizawa, Masaki Okada, Tsuyoshi Muro	
A U G U S T	18	The Seven Deadly Sins the Movie: Prisoners of the Sky	Noriyuki Abe	Yūki Kaji, Sora Amamiya, Misaki Kuno, Aoi Yūki	
A U G U S T	24	Killing for the Prosecutions	Masato Harada	Kazunari Ninomiya, Yuriko Yoshitaka, Yutaka Matsushige, Takehiro Hira	
A U G U S T	24	Modest Heroes	Hiromasa Yonebayashi, Yoshiyuki Momose, Akihiko Yamashita	Fumino Kimura, Rio Suzuki, Machiko Ono, Kentaro Sakaguchi	
A U G U S T	31	Sunny+	Hitoshi Ōne	Ryoko Shinohara, Suzu Hirose, Eiko Koike, Rie Tomosaka	
S E P T E M B E R	1	I Want to Eat Your Pancreas	Shinichiro Ushijima	Mahiro Takasugi, Lynn, Yukiyo Fujii, Yuuma Uchida	
S E P T E M B E R	1	Amiko	Yôko Yamanaka	Aira Sunohara, Hiroro Oshita, Maiko Mineo	
S E P T E M B E R	7	FLCL Alternative n' Progressive the Movie!	Katsuyuki Motohiro	Mayumi Shintani, Karen Miyama, Yuri Yoshida, Megumi Hayashibara	
S E P T E M B E R	7	Kasane	Yūichi Satō	Kyoko Yoshine, Tao Tsuchiya, You Yokoyama, Mariko Tsutsui	
S E P T E M B E R	7	Shottan, The Miracle	Toshiaki Toyoda	Ryuhei Matsuda, Yojiro Noda, Kento Nagayama, Shōta Sometani	
S E P T E M B E R	14	Hibiki	Sho Tsukikawa	Yurina Hirate, Keiko Kitagawa, Ayaka Wilson, Shun Oguri	
S E P T E M B E R	14	3D Kanojo: Real Girl	Tsutomu Hanabusa	Ayami Nakajo, Hayato Sano, Hiroya Shimizu, Yuri Tsunematsu	
S E P T E M B E R	21	Eating Women	Jiro Shono	Kyōko Koizumi, Erika Sawajiri, Atsuko Maeda, Alice Hirose	
S E P T E M B E R	21	Cafe Funiculì, Funiculà	Tsukahara Ayuko	Kasumi Arimura, Kentaro Ito, Haru, Kento Hayashi	
S E P T E M B E R	21	My Dad is a Heel Wrestler!	Kyōhei Fujimura	Hiroshi Tanahashi, Yoshino Kimura, Kokoro Terada, Riisa Naka	
S E P T E M B E R	28	Samurai's Promise	Daisaku Kimura	Junichi Okada, Hidetoshi Nishijima, Haru Kuroki, Sosuke Ikematsu, Hirofumi Arai, Kyoko Yoshine, Yūya Yagira	
S E P T E M B E R	29	Natsume's Book of Friends the Movie: Tied to the Temporal World	Takahiro Omori, Hideaki Itō	Hiroshi Kamiya, Kazuhiko Inoue, Sanae Kobayashi, Miki Itō	

=== October - December ===
Opening		Title	Director	Cast	Ref(s)
O C T O B E R	5	You Are the Apple of My Eye	Yasuo Hasegawa	Yuki Yamada, Asuka Saitō, Muko Matsumoto, Takara Sakumoto	
O C T O B E R	5	Monster Strike the Movie: Sora no Kanata	Hiroshi Nishikiori	Masataka Kubota, Alice Hirose, Kōichi Yamadera, Yūsuke Kobayashi	
O C T O B E R	5	That's Trico	Ryo Miyawaki	Ryo Yoshizawa, Yuko Araki, Yosuke Sugino, Rio Uchida	
O C T O B E R	5	Perfect World	Kenji Shibayama	Takanori Iwata, Hana Sugisaki, Kenta Suga, Sei Ashina	
O C T O B E R	12	Lock-On Love!	Noboru Iguchi	Taishi Nakagawa, Erika Karata, Kentaro Ito, Shouma Kai	
O C T O B E R	12	LOUDER!: Can't Hear What You're Singin', Wimp!	Satoshi Miki	Sadao Abe, Riho Yoshioka, Yudai Chiba, Kumiko Asō	
O C T O B E R	13	Every Day A Good Day	Tatsushi Ōmori	Haru Kuroki, Kirin Kiki, Mikako Tabe, Mayu Harada	
O C T O B E R	19	It's Boring Here, Pick Me Up	Ryūichi Hiroki	Ai Hashimoto, Mugi Kadowaki, Ryo Narita, Daichi Watanabe	
O C T O B E R	19	Gekijōban Haikara-san ga Tōru Kōhen - Tokyo Dai Roman	Kazuhiro Furuhashi, Toshiaki Kidokoro	Saori Hayami, Mamoru Miyano, Takahiro Sakurai, Kazuya Nakai	
O C T O B E R	19	Magical Girl Lyrical Nanoha: Detonation	Takayuki Hamana	Cast: Yukari Tamura, Nana Mizuki, Kana Ueda, Haruka Tomatsu	
O C T O B E R	19	Million Dollar Man	Keishi Otomo	Takeru Satoh, Issey Takahashi, Tatsuya Fujiwara, Kazuki Kitamura	
O C T O B E R	26	The Travelling Cat Chronicles	Koichiro Miki	Sota Fukushi, Mitsuki Takahata, Alice Hirose, Takurō Ōno	
O C T O B E R	26	Oz Land	Takafumi Hatano, Toshiaki Kidokoro	Haru, Hidetoshi Nishijima, Amane Okayama, Motoki Fukami	
N O V E M B E R	1	Memories of the Antique Books	Yukiko Mishima	Haru Kuroki, Shūhei Nomura, Ryo Narita, Kaho	
N O V E M B E R	2	Stolen Identity	Hideo Nakata	Keiko Kitagawa, Yudai Chiba, Bakarhythm, Jun Kaname	
N O V E M B E R	3	Run! T High School Basketball Club!	Takeshi Furusawa	Jun Shison, Hayato Sano, Akari Hayami, Junki Tozuka	
N O V E M B E R	9	Godzilla: The Planet Eater	Hiroyuki Seshita, Kōbun Shizuno	Mamoru Miyano, Takahiro Sakurai, Tomokazu Sugita, Junichi Suwabe	
N O V E M B E R	16	The House Where The Mermaid Sleeps	Yukihiko Tsutsumi	Ryoko Shinohara, Hidetoshi Nishijima, Kentaro Sakaguchi, Rina Kawaei	
N O V E M B E R	16	No Matter How My Mom Hates Me	Osamu Minorikawa	Taiga, Yō Yoshida, Win Morisaki, Shunya Shiraishi	
N O V E M B E R	23	Gangoose	Yu Irie	Mahiro Takasugi, Ryo Kato, Daichi Watanabe, Kento Hayashi	
N O V E M B E R	23	Hard Core	Nobuhiro Yamashita	Takayuki Yamada, Takeru Satoh, Yoshiyoshi Arakawa, Kei Ishibashi	
N O V E M B E R	30	Mobile Suit Gundam Narrative	Shunichi Yoshizawa	Junya Enoki, Tomo Muranaka, Ayu Matsuura	
N O V E M B E R	30	Our Departures: Railways 3	Yasuhiro Yoshida	Kasumi Arimura, Jun Kunimura, Nanami Sakuraba, Tatsunari Kiyama	
D E C E M B E R	7	It Comes	Tetsuya Nakashima	Junichi Okada, Haru Kuroki, Nana Komatsu, Takako Matsu	
D E C E M B E R	14	Waiting for Spring	Yuichiro Hirakawa	Tao Tsuchiya, Takumi Kitamura, Yuta Koseki, Hayato Isomura	
D E C E M B E R	14	Dragon Ball Super: Broly	Tatsuya Nagamine	Masako Nozawa, Ryō Horikawa, Ryūsei Nakao, Bin Shimada	
D E C E M B E R	14	Yo-kai Watch: Forever Friends	Shigeharu Takahashi	Shun Oguri, Chiemi Blouson, Nao Tōyama, Etsuko Kozakura	
D E C E M B E R	21	Nisekoi: False Love	Hayato Kawai	Kento Nakajima, Ayami Nakajo, Natsumi Ikema, Haruka Shimazaki	
D E C E M B E R	22	Kamen Rider Heisei Generations Forever	Kyohei Yamaguchi	So Okuno, Gaku Oshida, Ōhata Shieri, Keisuke Watanabe, Atsuhiro Inukai, Eiji Akaso, Kaho Takada, Kouhei Takeda, Kensei Mikami, Nayuta Fukuzaki	
D E C E M B E R	28	A Banana? At This Time of Night?!	Tetsu Maeda	Cast: Yo Oizumi, Mitsuki Takahata, Haruma Miura, Masato Hagiwara	

== See also ==
- 2018 in Japan
- 2018 in Japanese television
- List of 2018 box office number-one films in Japan
