= 2018 in Japan =

- Decades: 1990s; 2000s; 2010s; 2020s; 2030s
- See also: Other events of 2018; History of Japan • Timeline • Years

The following is an overview of the year 2018 in Japan.

== Incumbents ==
- Emperor: Akihito
- Prime Minister: Shinzō Abe

=== Governors ===
- Aichi Prefecture: Hideaki Omura
- Akita Prefecture: Norihisa Satake
- Aomori Prefecture: Shingo Mimura
- Chiba Prefecture: Kensaku Morita
- Ehime Prefecture: Tokihiro Nakamura
- Fukui Prefecture: Issei Nishikawa
- Fukuoka Prefecture: Hiroshi Ogawa
- Fukushima Prefecture: Masao Uchibori
- Gifu Prefecture: Hajime Furuta
- Gunma Prefecture: Masaaki Osawa
- Hiroshima Prefecture: Hidehiko Yuzaki
- Hokkaido: Harumi Takahashi
- Hyogo Prefecture: Toshizō Ido
- Ibaraki Prefecture: Kazuhiko Ōigawa
- Ishikawa Prefecture: Masanori Tanimoto
- Iwate Prefecture: Takuya Tasso
- Kagawa Prefecture: Keizō Hamada
- Kagoshima Prefecture: Satoshi Mitazono
- Kanagawa Prefecture: Yuji Kuroiwa
- Kochi Prefecture: Masanao Ozaki
- Kumamoto Prefecture: Ikuo Kabashima
- Kyoto Prefecture: Keiji Yamada (until 16 April); Takatoshi Nishiwaki (starting 16 April)
- Mie Prefecture: Eikei Suzuki
- Miyagi Prefecture: Yoshihiro Murai
- Miyazaki Prefecture: Shunji Kōno
- Nagano Prefecture: Shuichi Abe
- Nagasaki Prefecture: Hōdō Nakamura
- Nara Prefecture: Shōgo Arai
- Niigata Prefecture:
  - until 27 April: Ryūichi Yoneyama
  - 27 April-12 June: Morio Takai
  - starting 12 June: Hideyo Hanazumi
- Oita Prefecture: Katsusada Hirose
- Okayama Prefecture: Ryuta Ibaragi
- Okinawa Prefecture:
  - until 9 August: Takeshi Onaga
  - 9 August-12 August: Kiichiro Jahana
  - 12 August-3 October: Moritake Tomikawa
  - starting 4 October: Denny Tamaki
- Osaka Prefecture: Ichirō Matsui
- Saga Prefecture: Yoshinori Yamaguchi
- Saitama Prefecture: Kiyoshi Ueda
- Shiga Prefecture: Taizō Mikazuki
- Shiname Prefecture: Zenbe Mizoguchi
- Shizuoka Prefecture: Heita Kawakatsu
- Tochigi Prefecture: Tomikazu Fukuda
- Tokushima Prefecture: Kamon Iizumi
- Tokyo: Yuriko Koike
- Tottori Prefecture: Shinji Hirai
- Toyama Prefecture: Takakazu Ishii
- Wakayama Prefecture: Yoshinobu Nisaka
- Yamagata Prefecture: Mieko Yoshimura
- Yamaguchi Prefecture: Tsugumasa Muraoka
- Yamanashi Prefecture: Hitoshi Gotō

== Events ==
=== January ===
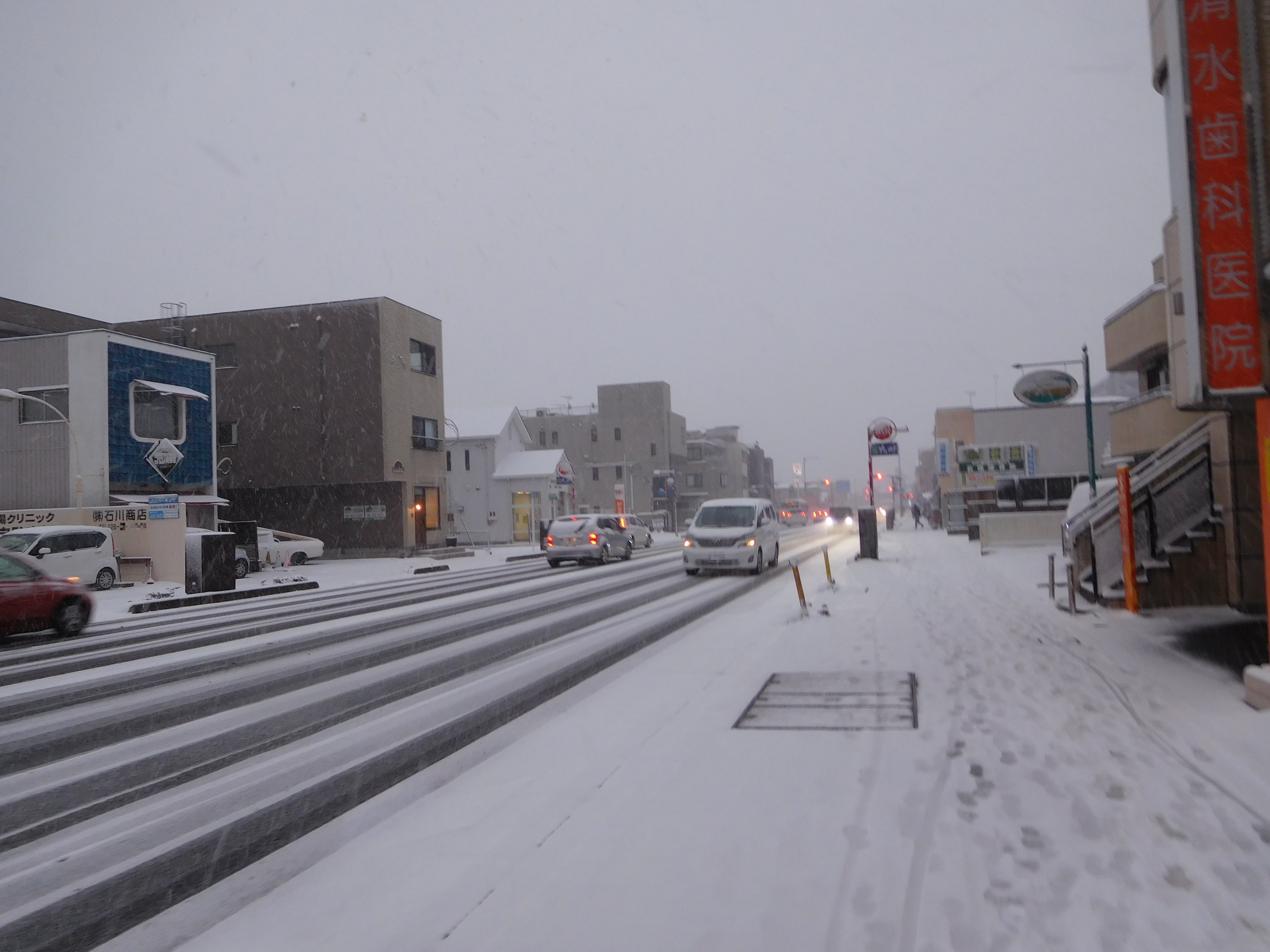
heavy snow hit in Utsunomiya, Tochigi Prefecture on 22 January

- 22 to 23 January: A heavy snowfall hits around Tokyo Metropolitan Area. According to the Fire and Disaster Management Agency of Japan in a confirmed report, 956 people were injured.
- 23 January: Mount Kusatsu-Shirane erupts. According to the Fire and Disaster Management Agency of Japan in a confirmed report, 1 fatality results and 11 people are injured in Gunma Prefecture.
- 31 January: A fire burns an elderly support facility in Higashi-ku, Sapporo, Hokkaido. According to the Fire and Disaster Management Agency of Japan in a confirmed report, 11 people died, with three injured.

=== February ===
- 5 to 8 February: A heavy snowfall hits the Sea of Japan. According to the Fire and Disaster Management Agency of Japan in a confirmed report, 22 people died, with 320 injures.

=== March ===
- 1 to 12 March: According to the Japan Meteorological Agency in a confirmed report, a volcano erupts in Shinmoedake, Kyushu Island.
- 12 March: According to the Japanese Government, an official confirmed that the Japan Ministry of Finance rewrote 14 decision documents in accordance with the response about a cooperative school in Osaka Prefecture to the National Assembly in 2017.
- 13 March: According to the Japan Forestry and Forest Products Research Institute, an official report confirmed the Kumano cherry tree (Kumanozakura) as a new species Cherry tree (Sakura). The tree was discovered widely throughout the Kii Peninsula. The last new type of Sakura tree found in Japan was in 1915.

=== April ===
- 8 April: According to National Police Agency of Japan official confirmed report, a thirty-eight years old men arrested on suspicion of five local residents murdered, and suspects confessed in Hioki, Kagoshima Prefecture.
- 9 April: A Richer Scale 5.7 magnitude earthquake hit in Oda, Shimane Prefecture, according to the Fire and Disaster Management Agency of Japan in a confirmed report, nine persons were injured.
- 11 April: According to the Fire and Disaster Management Agency of Japan in a confirmed report, a sudden landslide occurred on a mountain slope in Yabakei, Nakatsu, Oita Prefecture, where six person fatalities in the incident.
- 19 April: According to a Japan Meteorological Agency confirmed report, Mount Iou erupted for the first time since 1768 in border between Miyazaki Prefecture and Kagoshima Prefecture.

=== June ===
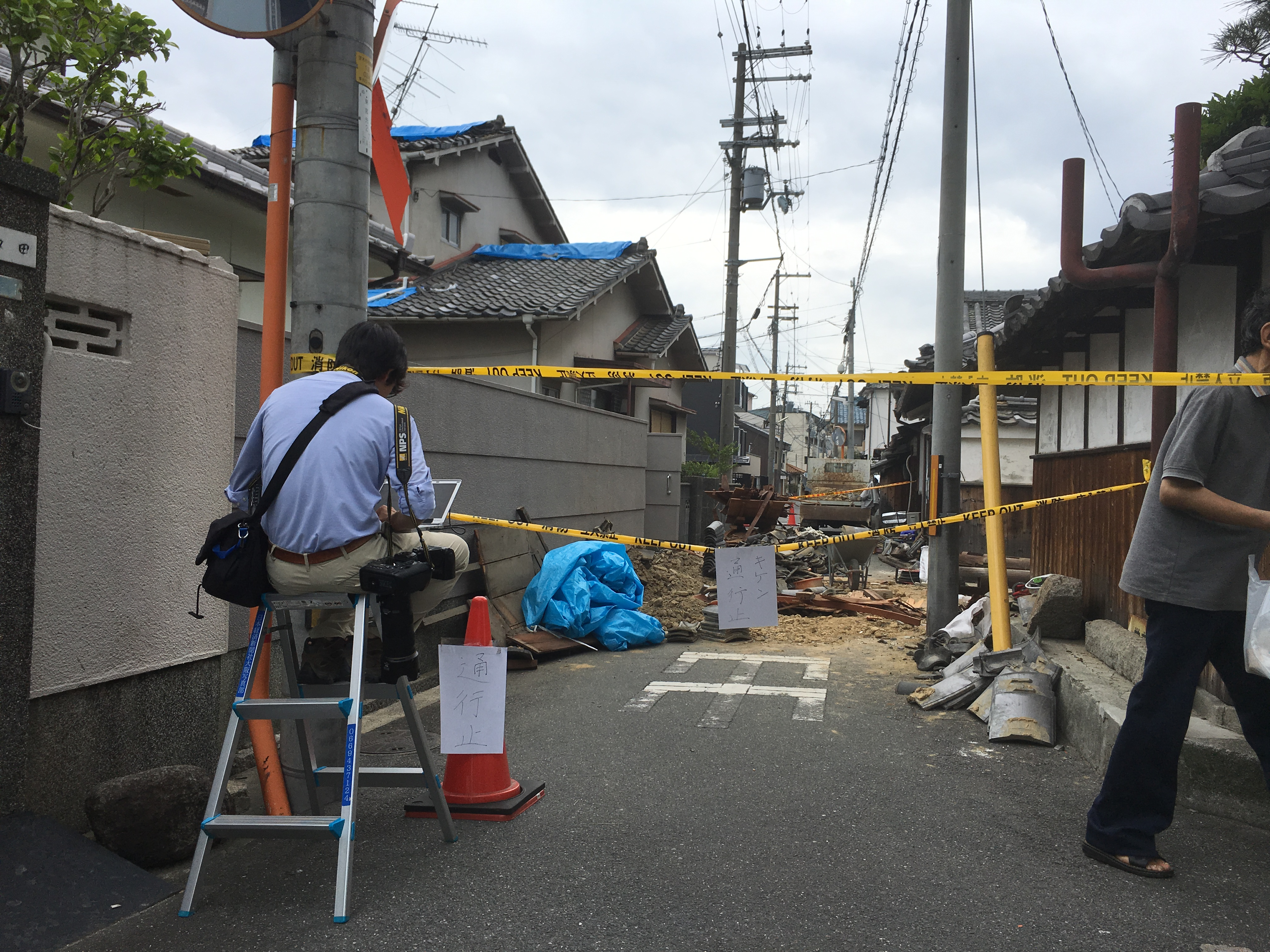
Damage done by the 2018 Osaka earthquake, in Ibaraki, Osaka Prefecture on 18 June.

- 9 June – According to the Japan National Police Agency in a confirmed report, 22-year-old unemployed Ichiro Kojima was detained by police after stabbing 3 passengers, killing one, on a bullet train leading from Tokyo to Shin-Osaka, nearby Odawara, Kanagawa Prefecture.
- 18 June – 2018 Osaka earthquake, According to Japan Fire and Disaster Management Agency in a confirmed report, a 5.5 Richter scale earthquake killed four and injured 434 people in Takatsuki, Osaka Prefecture.
- 26 June – According to Japan National Police Agency confirmed report, a man murdered the police officer in policebox, depriving the handgun and escaping, after a man killed to a security guard man near a nearby elementary school in Toyama City. A twenty-two years old detained, after critical condition by with attempted suicide.
- 29 June – According to Japan Meteorological Agency confirmed report, a F2 level tornado hit in around area of Maibara, Shiga Prefecture. According to local government official confirmed, many houses were collapsed and damaged, total eight person were wounded.

=== July ===
- 28 June – 9 July: 2018 Japan floods – Heavy floods was started in western areas of Japan, most in the Hiroshima Prefecture, which has been hit by torrential rain. As of 20 July, 225 people were killed, another 13 were declared missing and 1.5 million people were displaced.
- 9 July – 26 August: The 2018 Northeast Asia heat wave kills least 116 people, due to heat-related causes, and at least 22,000 more suffer from heat strokes
- 20 July: Mamoru Hosoda's Japanese animated film Mirai is released in cinema
- 26 July: A fire at under constructing technology centre fire in Tama City, Tokyo. According to Fire and Disaster Management Agency confirmed report, total five workers fatalities with 42 injured.

=== August ===
- 9 August: According to Ministry of Land, Infrastructure, Transport and Tourism official confirmed report, nine people lost their lives when a Bell 412EP helicopter crashed into forest site, Nakanojo, Gunma Prefecture.

=== September ===
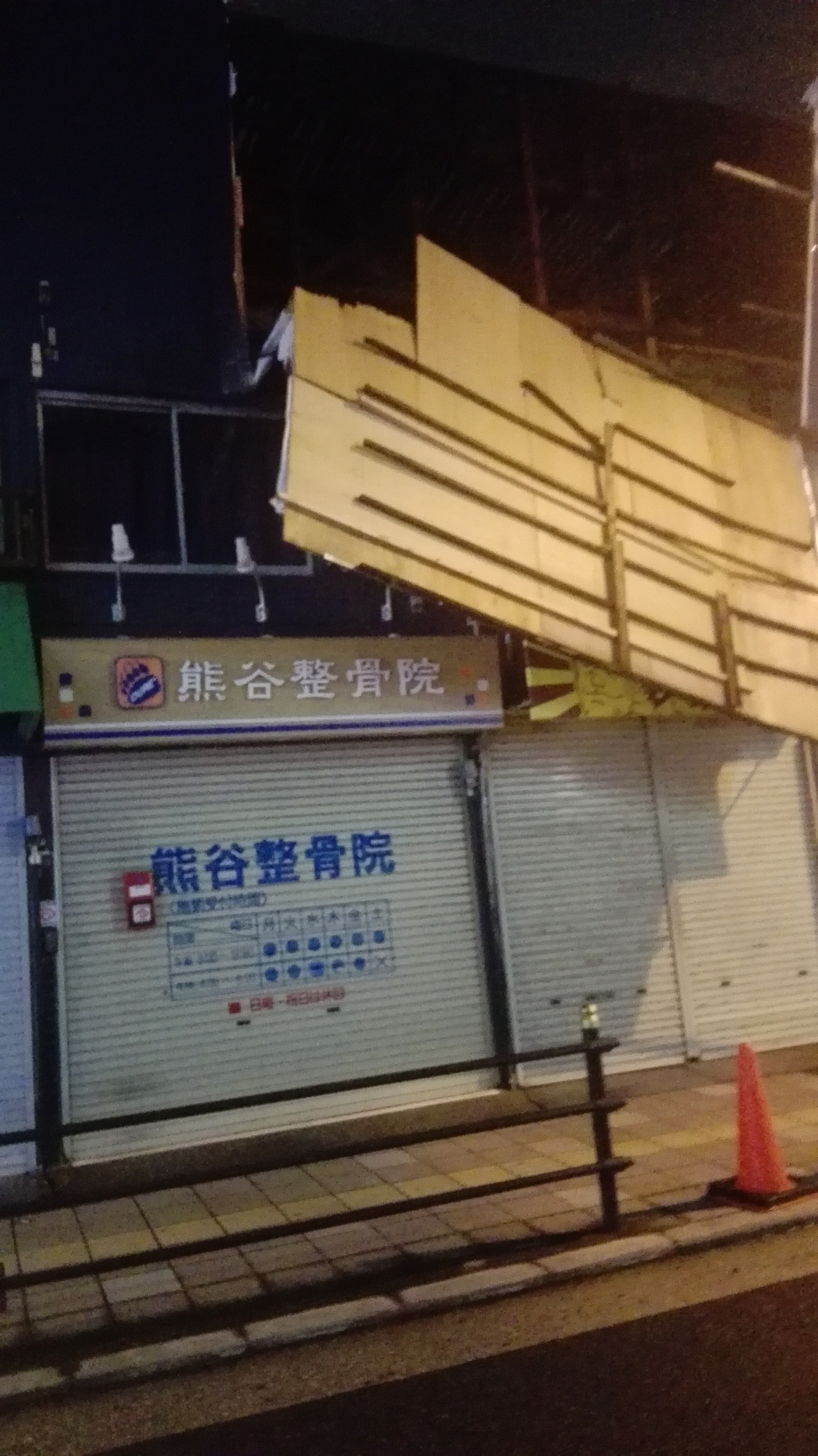
Accident occurs when the roof falls in Tsurumi-ku, Osaka, affective by Typhoon Jebi on 5 September 2018

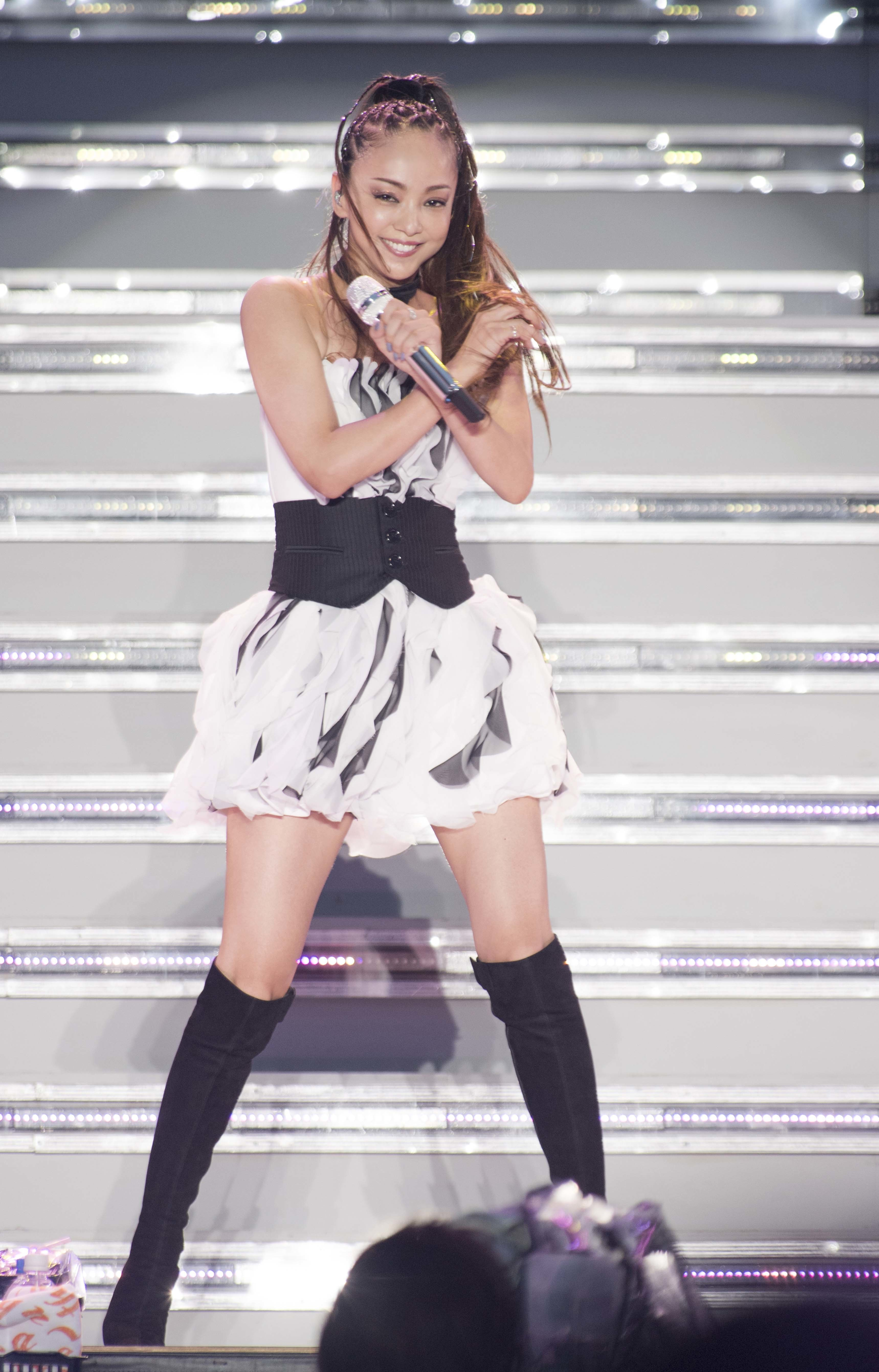
Retired singer, Namie Amuro in 2017

- 4 September: Typhoon Jebi. Storm surge in Osaka Bay inundated Kansai International Airport and pushed a tanker vessel into the bridge that connects the artificial island to the mainland, damaging it. According to Japan Fire and Disaster Management Agency official report, strong wind and damage around Kansai area resulted in thirteen fatalities and 912 people receiving injuries.
- 6 September: 2018 Hokkaido Eastern Iburi earthquake, A Richter scale 6.6 earthquake created a region-wide power outage, because of damage to a thermal power station in the hard-hit town, Atsuma. According to a Japan Fire and Disaster Management Agency official report, 41 people were killed and 692 people were wounded.
- 16 September: Namie Amuro, a famous pop singer, officially retired after 25 years in the entertainment industry.
- 20 September: Prime Minister Shinzō Abe won the Liberal Democratic Party (Japan) leadership for a new 3-year term.

=== November ===
- 19 November – According to Tokyo District Public Prosecutors Office Special Prosecutors Department official confirmed report, Carlos Ghosn, CEO of Nissan, was arrested by the prosecutor special authority for alleged false statement of the securities report that he declared the compensation inexorably. Ghosn president position and position of representative director of Nissan, succeeded at the Board of Directors on 22 November.
- 23 November – Osaka decide on the venue on Expo 2025 the winner at BIE's 164th General Assembly.
- 26 November – According to Japan National Police Agency confirmed report, six person were murdered, with a suspicion suicide onto Gokase River, in Takachiho, Miyazaki Prefecture.

=== December ===
- 26 December – Japan announced that since the International Whaling Commission IWC failed its duty to promote sustainable hunting, which is one of its stated goals, Japan is withdrawing its membership and will resume commercial hunting in its territorial waters and exclusive economic zone from July 2019, but will cease whaling activities in the Antarctic Ocean.
- 27 December – Japan executes two more prisoners, bringing 2018 executions to 15 taking annual total to highest since 2008.

== The Nobel Prize ==
- Tasuku Honjo: 2018 Nobel Prize in Physiology or Medicine winner.

== Arts and entertainment ==
- 2018 in anime
- 2018 in Japanese music
- 2018 in Japanese television
- List of 2018 box office number-one films in Japan
- List of Japanese films of 2018

== Sports ==
- October 7 – 2018 Formula One World Championship is held at 2018 Japanese Grand Prix
- October 21 – 2018 MotoGP World Championship is held at 2018 Japanese motorcycle Grand Prix
- 2018 F4 Japanese Championship
- 2018 Japanese Formula 3 Championship
- 2018 Super Formula Championship
- 2018 Super GT Series
- 2018 in Japanese football
- 2018 J1 League
- 2018 J2 League
- 2018 J3 League
- 2018 Japan Football League
- 2018 Japanese Regional Leagues
- 2018 Japanese Super Cup
- 2018 Emperor's Cup
- 2018 J.League Cup

== Deaths ==
=== January ===
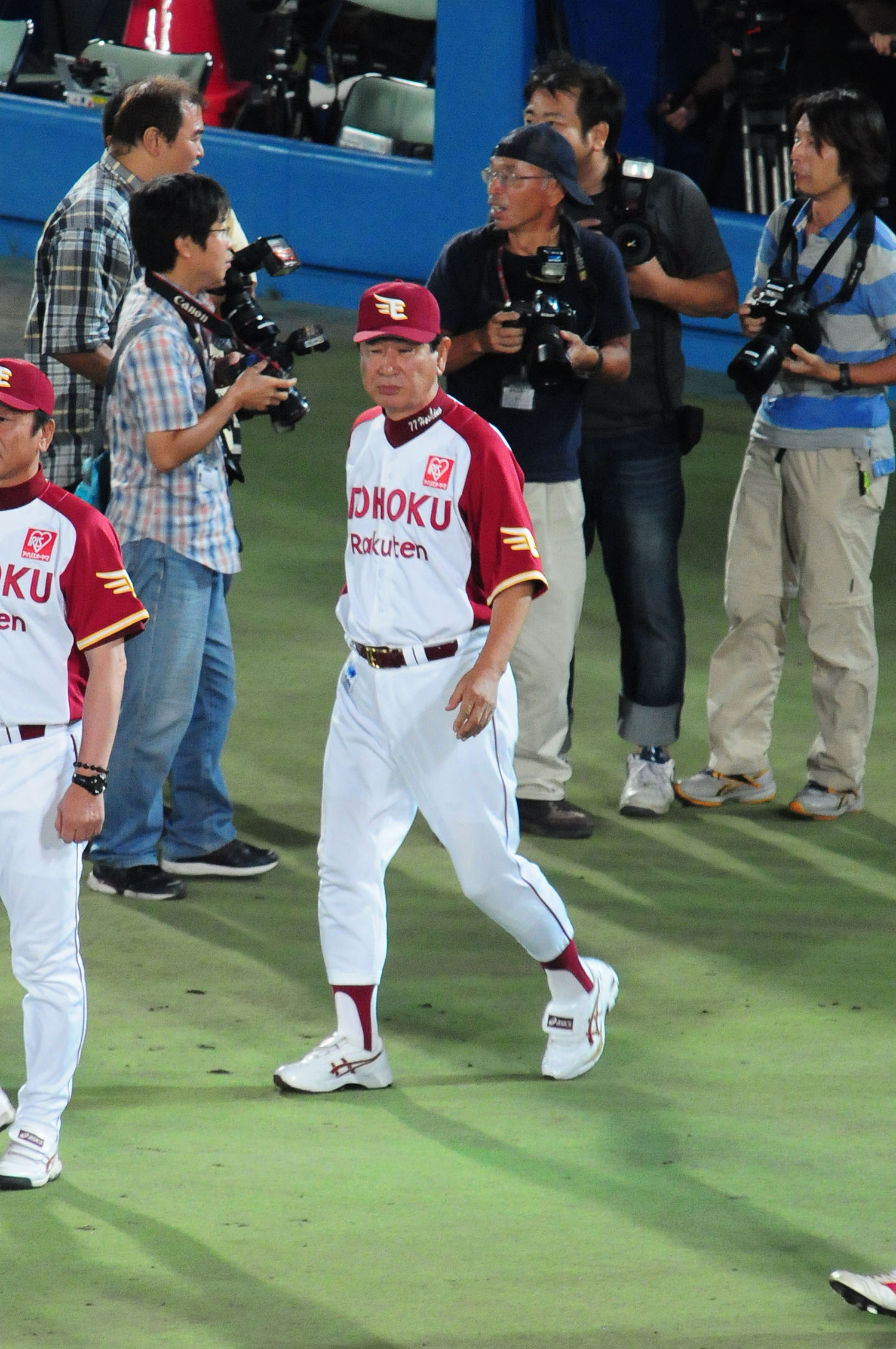
Senichi Hoshino

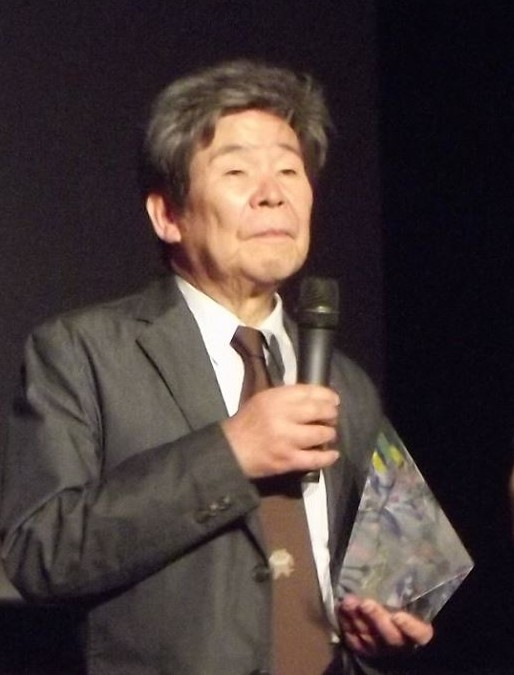
Isao Takahata

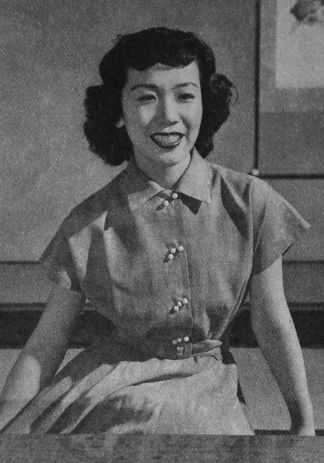
Yukiji Asaoka

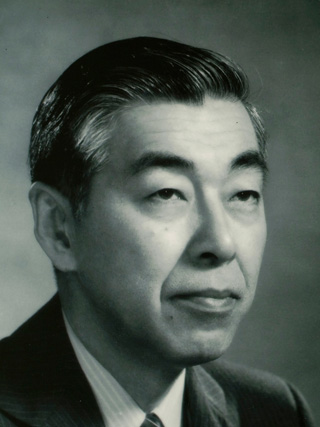
Kimishige Ishizaka

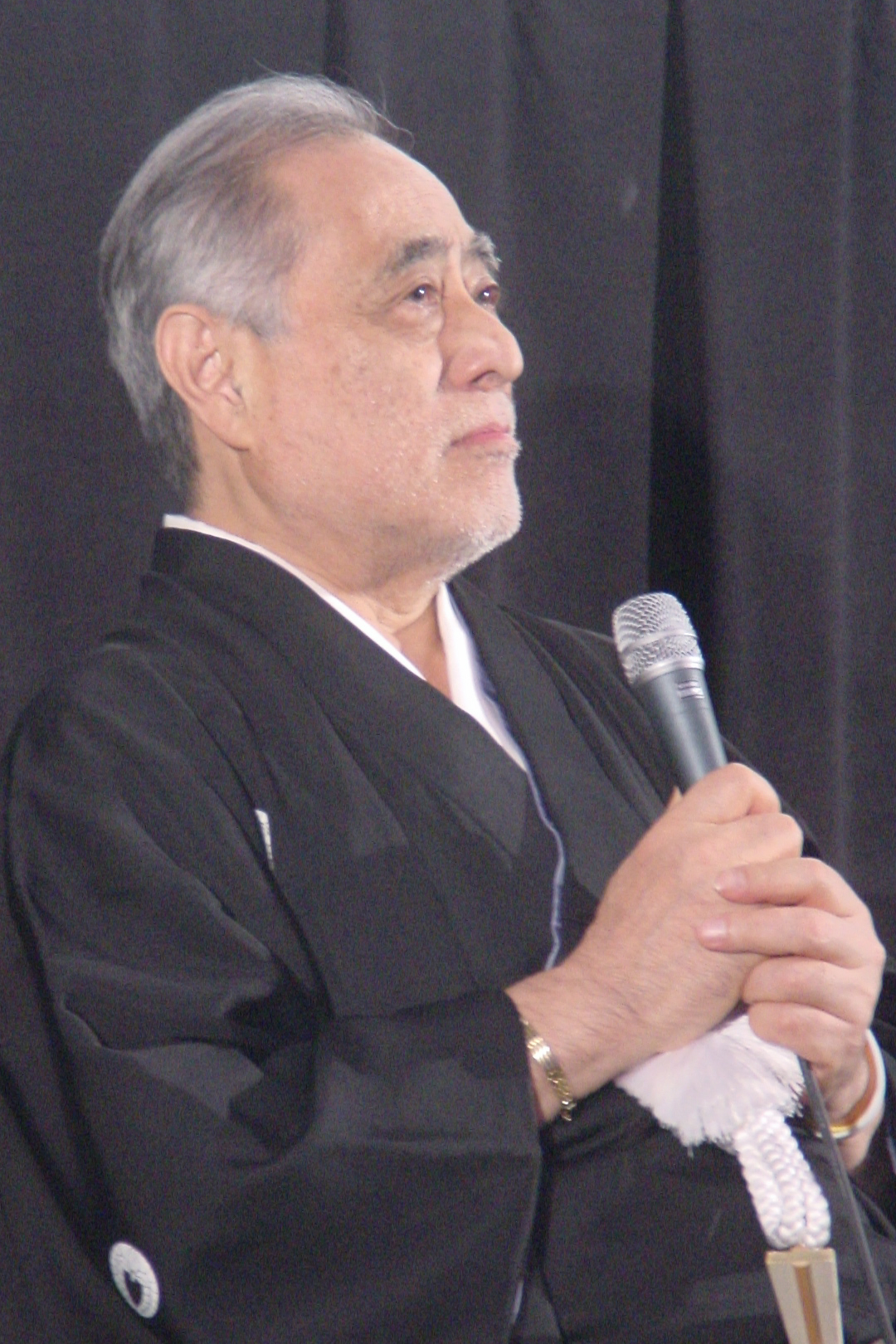
Masahiko Tsugawa

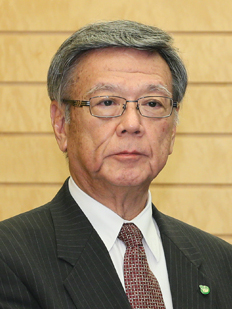
Takeshi Onaga

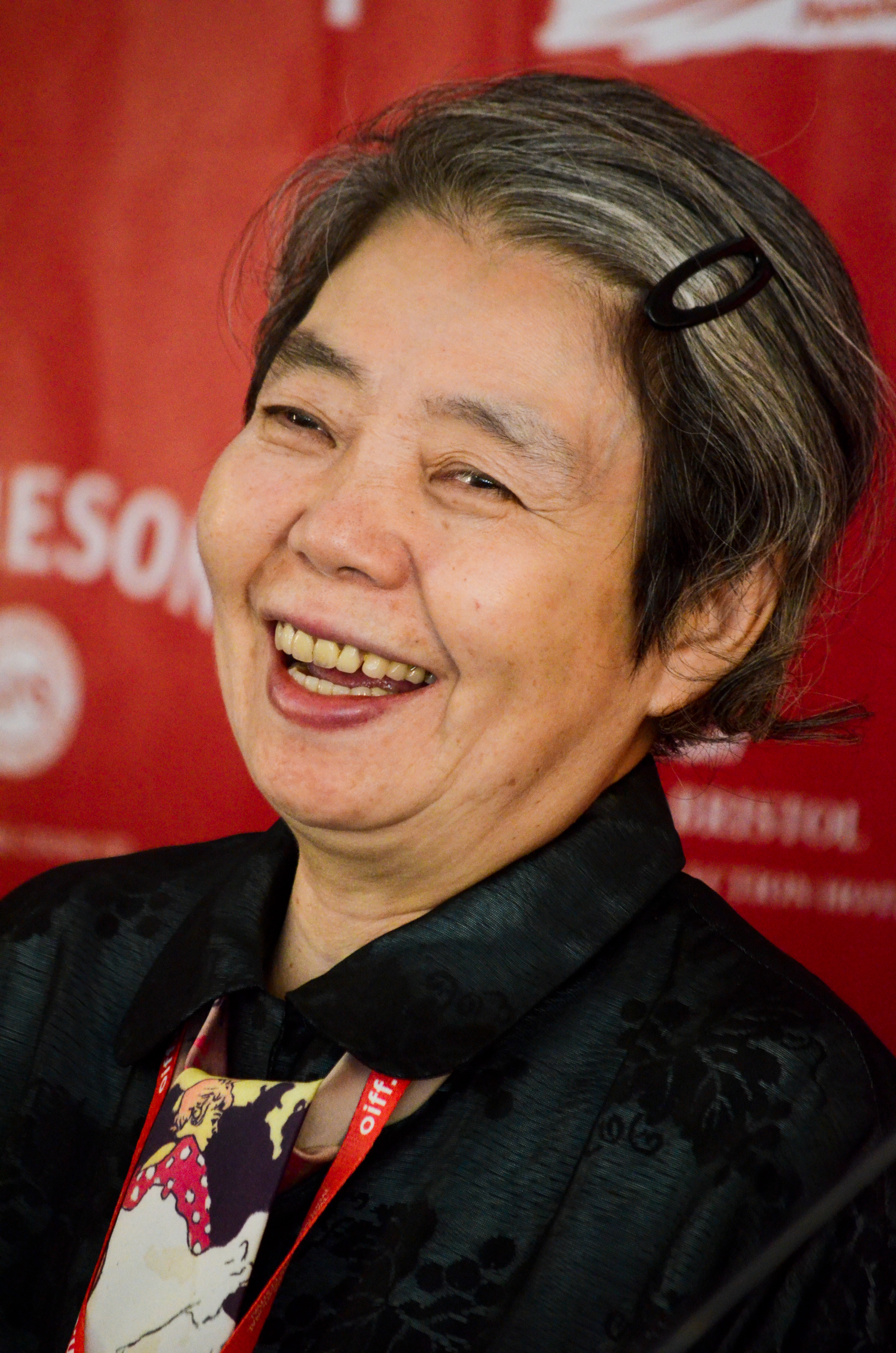
Kirin Kiki

- January 1 – Katsuhikari Toshio, sumo wrestler (b. 1942)
- January 4 – Senichi Hoshino, baseball player and manager (b. 1947)
- January 5 – Mikio Fujioka, guitarist (b. 1981)
- January 7 – Marley Carib, manga artist (b. 1947)
- January 11 – Sumiko Iwao, psychologist and educator (b. 1935)
- January 14 – Yosuke Natsuki, actor (b. 1936)
- January 18 – Yasuo Tanaka, astrophysicist (b. 1931)
- January 20 – Miyako Sumiyoshi, speed skater (b. 1987)
- January 21 – Tsukasa Hosaka, football player and manager (b. 1937)
- January 26
  - Hiromu Nonaka, politician (b. 1925)
  - Yukiaki Okabe, freestyle swimmer (b. 1941)
- January 27 – Tadashi Sawashima, film director (b. 1926)
- January 31
  - Tadashi Sasaki, engineer (b. 1915)
  - Itokin, musician (b. 1979)

=== February ===
- February 4 – Takuya Iwasaki, archaeologist (b. 1929)
- February 5 – Yoshihide Kozai, astronomer (b. 1928)
- February 10
  - Michiko Ishimure, novelist (b. 1927)
  - Tamio Kawachi, actor (b. 1938)
- 18 February – Eido Tai Shimano, Buddhist monk (b. 1932)
- February 20
  - Jiichiro Date, freestyle wrestler (b. 1952).
  - Tōta Kaneko, poet (b. 1919)
- February 21 – Ren Osugi, actor (b. 1951)

=== March ===
- March 24 – Hidetoshi Nagasawa, sculptor and architect (b. 1940)

=== April ===
- April 5 – Isao Takahata, film director (b. 1935)
- April 21 – Nabi Tajima, supercentenarian (b. 1900)
- April 23 – Sachio Kinugasa, baseball player (b. 1947)
- April 27 – Yukiji Asaoka, actress (b. 1935)

=== May ===
- May 16 – Hideki Saijo, singer and actor (b. 1955)
- May 17 – Yuriko Hoshi, actress (b. 1943)
- May 21 – Nobukazu Kuriki, mountaineer (b. 1982)

=== June ===
- June 18 – Go Kato, actor (b. 1938)

=== July ===
- July 2 – Katsura Utamaru, rakugo comedian (b. 1936)
- July 6
  - Shoko Asahara, doomsday cult leader (b. 1955).
  - Seiichi Endo, cult member and criminal (b. 1960).
  - Yoshihiro Inoue, cult member and criminal (b. 1969).
  - Kimishige Ishizaka, immunologist (b. 1925).
  - Tomomitsu Niimi, cult member and criminal (b. 1964).
- July 19 – Shinobu Hashimoto, screenwriter (b. 1918)
- July 21 – Ryu Matsumoto, politician (b. 1951).

=== August ===
- August 4 – Masahiko Tsugawa, actor (b. 1940)
- August 8 – Takeshi Onaga, politician (b. 1950)
- August 10 – Kin Sugai, actress (b. 1926)
- August 13 – Unshō Ishizuka, voice actor (b. 1951)
- August 15 – Momoko Sakura, manga artist (b. 1965)
- August 25 – Miyoko Asō, voice actress (b. 1926)
- August 27 – Aya Koyama, mixed martial artist (b. 1973)

=== September ===
- September 15 – Kirin Kiki, actress (b. 1943)
- September 18 – Norifumi Yamamoto, mixed martial artist (b. 1977)

=== October ===
- October 8 – Wajima Hiroshi, sumo wrestler (b. 1948)
- October 11 – Yoshito Sengoku, politician (b. 1946)
- October 17 – Kōji Tsujitani, voice actor (b. 1962)
- October 19 – Takanobu Hozumi, actor (b. 1931)
- October 20 – Jun Ashida, fashion designer (b. 1930)
- October 27 – Kyoko Enami, actress (b. 1942)

=== November ===
- November 6 – Tetsuo Gotō, voice actor (b. 1950)
- November 11 – Hiroyuki Sonoda, politician (b. 1942)
- November 27 – Mahito Tsujimura, voice actor (b. 1930)
- November 28 – Masahiko Katsuya, columnist (b. 1960)
- November 29 – Harue Akagi, actress (b. 1924)

=== December ===
- December 28 – Toshiko Fujita, voice actress (b. 1950)

== Elections ==
=== Prefectural ===
- March 11: Ishikawa gubernatorial
- April 8: Kyoto gubernatorial
- June 10: Niigata gubernatorial
- September 30: Okinawa gubernatorial

=== AKB48 Senbatsu Sousenkyo ===
- The 53rd single 10th Sekai Senbatsu Sousenkyo was held on Nagoya Stadium, Aichi Prefecture, Japan on June 16, 2018

Final Senbatsu Results:

  - 1. Jurina Matsui (Over-all center girl, SKE48-Team S)
  - 2. Akari Suda (SKE48)
  - 3. Sakura Miyawaki (HKT48)
  - 4. Yuka Ogino (NGT48)
  - 5. Nana Okada (AKB48/STU48)
  - 6. Yui Yokoyama (AKB48)
  - 7. Tomu Mutou (AKB48)
