= List of 2018 box office number-one films in Japan =

The following is a list of 2018 box office number-one films in Japan by week. When the number-one film in gross is not the same as the number-one film in admissions, both are listed.

== Number-one films ==
| † | This implies the highest-grossing movie of the year. |

| Week # | Date | Film | Gross | Notes |
|---|---|---|---|---|
| 1 | January 7, 2018 | Kingsman: The Golden Circle | US$4.21 million | |
| 2 | January 14, 2018 | Star Wars: The Last Jedi | US$1.87 million | |
| 3 | January 21, 2018 | Geostorm | US$2.2 million | |
| 4 | January 28, 2018 | The Crimes That Bind | US$2.4 million | |
| 5 | February 4, 2018 | The Crimes That Bind | US$1.62 million | |
| 6 | February 11, 2018 | Color Me True | US$1.5 million | |
| 7 | February 18, 2018 | The Greatest Showman | US$4.8 million | |
| 8 | February 25, 2018 | The Greatest Showman | US$3.4 million | |
| 9 | March 4, 2018 | Doraemon the Movie: Nobita's Treasure Island | US$8 million | |
| 10 | March 11, 2018 | Doraemon the Movie: Nobita's Treasure Island | US$6.6 million | |
| 11 | March 18, 2018 | Coco | US$4.58 million | In gross |
| 11 | March 18, 2018 | Doraemon the Movie: Nobita's Treasure Island | US$4.32 million | In attendance |
| 12 | March 25, 2018 | The Boss Baby | US$3.35 million | |
| 13 | April 1, 2018 | Coco | US$3.6 million | |
| 14 | April 8, 2018 | Coco | US$2.8 million | |
| 15 | April 15, 2018 | Detective Conan: Zero the Enforcer | US$12.08 million | |
| 16 | April 22, 2018 | Detective Conan: Zero the Enforcer | US$7.5 million | |
| 17 | April 29, 2018 | Avengers: Infinity War | US$9.07 million | |
| 18 | May 6, 2018 | Detective Conan: Zero the Enforcer | US$5.05 million | |
| 19 | May 13, 2018 | Detective Conan: Zero the Enforcer | US$2.51 million | |
| 20 | May 20, 2018 | Detective Conan: Zero the Enforcer | US$1.98 million | |
| 21 | May 27, 2018 | Detective Conan: Zero the Enforcer | US$1.64 million | |
| 22 | June 3, 2018 | Deadpool 2 | US$5.3 million | |
| 23 | June 10, 2018 | Shoplifters | US$4.04 million | |
| 24 | June 17, 2018 | Shoplifters | US$3.11 million | |
| 25 | June 24, 2018 | Shoplifters | US$2.39 million | |
| 26 | July 1, 2018 | Solo: A Star Wars Story | US$4.51 million | |
| 27 | July 8, 2018 | Solo: A Star Wars Story | US$2.65 million | |
| 28 | July 15, 2018 | Jurassic World: Fallen Kingdom | US$13.42 million | |
| 29 | July 22, 2018 | Jurassic World: Fallen Kingdom | US$6.73 million | |
| 30 | July 29, 2018 | Code Blue | US$9.86 million | |
| 31 | August 5, 2018 | Mission: Impossible – Fallout | US$7.8 million | |
| 32 | August 12, 2018 | Code Blue | US$5.5 million | |
| 33 | August 19, 2018 | Gintama 2 | US$4.77 million | |
| 34 | August 26, 2018 | Gintama 2 | US$3.33 million | |
| 35 | September 2, 2018 | Killing for the Prosecution | US$3.05 million | |
| 36 | September 9, 2018 | Killing for the Prosecution | US$1.85 million | |
| 37 | September 16, 2018 | Christopher Robin | US$2.96 million | |
| 38 | September 23, 2018 | Christopher Robin | US$2.27 million | |
| 39 | September 30, 2018 | Natsume's Book of Friends the Movie: Tied to the Temporal World | US$1.51 million | |
| 40 | October 7, 2018 | Monster Strike The Movie: Sora no Kanata | US$1.32 million | |
| 41 | October 14, 2018 | The House with a Clock in Its Walls | US$1.01 million | |
| 42 | October 21, 2018 | The Laws of the Universe - Part 1 | US$1.18 million | |
| 43 | October 28, 2018 | Pretty Cure 15th Anniversary | US$3.15 million | |
| 44 | November 4, 2018 | Venom | US$3.87 million | |
| 45 | November 11, 2018 | Bohemian Rhapsody † | US$4.10 million | |
| 46 | November 18, 2018 | Bohemian Rhapsody † | US$3.44 million | |
| 47 | November 25, 2018 | Fantastic Beasts: The Crimes of Grindelwald | US$7.56 million | |
| 48 | December 2, 2018 | Fantastic Beasts: The Crimes of Grindelwald | US$6.56 million | |
| 49 | December 9, 2018 | Fantastic Beasts: The Crimes of Grindelwald | US$4.59 million | |
| 50 | December 16, 2018 | Dragon Ball Super: Broly | US$9.26 million | |
| 51 | December 23, 2018 | Ralph Breaks the Internet | US$4.06 million | |

== Highest-grossing films ==
International film Japanese film

Highest-grossing films of 2018
| Rank | Title | Gross |
|---|---|---|
| 1 | Bohemian Rhapsody | ¥10.46 billion ($94.73 million) |
| 2 | Code Blue | ¥9.30 billion ($84.22 million) |
| 3 | Case Closed: Zero the Enforcer | ¥9.18 billion ($83.13 million) |
| 4 | Jurassic World: Fallen Kingdom | ¥8.07 billion ($73.08 million) |
| 5 | Star Wars: The Last Jedi | ¥7.51 billion ($68.01 million) |
| 6 | Doraemon the Movie: Nobita's Treasure Island | ¥5.37 billion ($48.63 million) |
| 7 | The Greatest Showman | ¥5.22 billion ($47.27 million) |
| 8 | Coco | ¥5.00 billion ($45.28 million) |
| 9 | Incredibles 2 | ¥4.90 billion ($44.37 million) |
| 10 | Mission: Impossible – Fallout | ¥4.72 billion ($42.74 million) |

== See also ==
- List of Japanese films of 2018
