= 42nd Japan Academy Film Prize =

Japanese film awards in 2019

- Date: March 1, 2019
- Site: Grand Prince Hotel New Takanawa, Tokyo, Japan
- Hosted by: Toshiyuki Nishida; Yū Aoi

Highlights
- Best Picture: Shoplifters
- Most awards: Shoplifters (8)
- Most nominations: Shoplifters (12); The Blood of Wolves (12); Sakura Guardian in the North (12)

The 42nd Japan Academy Film Prize (第42回日本アカデミー賞) is the 42nd edition of the Japan Academy Film Prize, an award presented by the Nippon Academy-Sho Association to award excellence in filmmaking. It awarded the best films of 2018 and took place on March 1, 2019 at the Grand Prince Hotel New Takanawa in Tokyo, Japan.

== Winners and nominees ==
=== Awards ===
Picture of the Year	Animation of the Year
Shoplifters; One Cut of the Dead; Sakura Guardian in the North; The Blood of Wolves; Recall	Mirai; Dragon Ball Super: Broly; Penguin Highway; Detective Conan: Zero the Enforcer; Okko's Inn
Director of the Year	Screenplay of the Year
Hirokazu Kore-eda – Shoplifters; Shinichiro Ueda – One Cut of the Dead; Kazuya Shiraishi – The Blood of Wolves; Yōjirō Takita – Sakura Guardian in the North; Katsuhide Motoki – Recall	Hirokazu Kore-eda – Shoplifters; Jun'ya Ikegami – The Blood of Wolves; Shinichiro Ueda – One Cut of the Dead; Machiko Nasu – Sakura Guardian in the North; Tamio Hayashi – Recall
Outstanding Performance by an Actor in a Leading Role	Outstanding Performance by an Actress in a Leading Role
Kōji Yakusho – The Blood of Wolves; Junichi Okada – Samurai's Promise; Hiroshi Tachi – Life in Overtime; Takayuki Hamatsu – One Cut of the Dead; Lily Franky – Shoplifters	Sakura Ando – Shoplifters; Haru Kuroki – Every Day a Good Day; Ryoko Shinohara – The House Where the Mermaid Sleeps; Mayu Matsuoka – Tremble All You Want; Sayuri Yoshinaga – Sakura Guardian in the North
Outstanding Performance by an Actor in a Supporting Role	Outstanding Performance by an Actress in a Supporting Role
Tori Matsuzaka – The Blood of Wolves; Ittoku Kishibe – Sakura Guardian in the North; Dean Fujioka – Recall; Hidetoshi Nishijima – Samurai's Promise; Kazunari Ninomiya – Killing for the Prosecution	Kirin Kiki – Shoplifters (posthumous award); Kirin Kiki – Every Day a Good Day; Ryoko Shinohara – Sakura Guardian in the North; Kyoko Fukada – Recall; Yōko Maki – The Blood of Wolves; Mayu Matsuoka – Shoplifters
Outstanding Achievement in Music	Outstanding Achievement in Cinematography
Haruomi Hosono – Shoplifters; Kei Ogura, Katsu Hoshi, and Shōgo Kaida – Sakura Guardian in the North; Takashi Kako – Samurai's Promise; Nobuhiro Suzuki, Shōma Itō, and Kyle Nagai – One Cut of the Dead; Gorō Yasukawa – The Blood of Wolves; Gorō Yasukawa – Recall	Ryūto Kondō – Shoplifters; Daisaku Kimura – Samurai's Promise; Takeshi Sone – One Cut of the Dead; Takahiro Haibara – The Blood of Wolves; Takeshi Hamada – Sakura Guardian in the North
Outstanding Achievement in Lighting Direction	Outstanding Achievement in Art Direction
Isamu Fujii – Shoplifters; Kenjirō Sō – Samurai's Promise; Minoru Kawai – The Blood of Wolves; Hitoshi Takaya – Sakura Guardian in the North	Tsutomu Imamura – The Blood of Wolves; Takashi Nishimura – Recall; Mitsuo Harada – Samurai's Promise; Kyōko Heya – Sakura Guardian in the North; Keiko Mitsumatsu – Shoplifters
Outstanding Achievement in Sound Recording	Outstanding Achievement in Film Editing
Kazuharu Urata – The Blood of Wolves; Osamu Onodera – Sakura Guardian in the North; Kazuhiro Kurihara – Recall; Kōkichi Komoda – One Cut of the Dead; Kazuhiko Tomita – Shoplifters	Shinichiro Ueda – One Cut of the Dead; Hitomi Katō – The Blood of Wolves; Isao Kawase – Recall; Hirokazu Kore-eda – Shoplifters; Hidemi Li – Sakura Guardian in the North
Outstanding Foreign Language Film	Newcomer of the Year
Bohemian Rhapsody; The Greatest Showman; The Shape of Water; Three Billboards Outside Ebbing, Missouri; Mission: Impossible – Fallout	Moka Kamishiraishi – A Forest of Wool and Steel; Shuri – Love At Least; Yurina Hirate – Hibiki; Kyoko Yoshine – Kasane and Samurai's Promise; Kentarō Itō – Cafe Funiculi Funicula; Taishi Nakagawa – Kids on the Slope and Lock-On Love; Ryo Narita – Stolen Identity and The Antique: Secret of the Old Books; Ryo Yoshizawa – River's Edge
Popularity Award	
Kentarō Itō – Cafe Funiculi Funicula (Actor Category); One Cut of the Dead (Production Category)	
