= Stepmom and Daughter Blues =

2011 manga series

- Cover of the first volume

義母と娘のブルース (Gibo to Musume no Burūsu)
- Manga
- Written by: Sakurazawa Suzu
- Published by: Bunkasha
- Magazine: Shunin ga Yuku! Special
- Original run: February 4, 2011 – June 14, 2012
- Volumes: 2
- Television drama
- Directed by: Yuichiro Hirakawa; Yuji Nakamae
- Produced by: Kazutaka Iida
- Written by: Yoshiko Morishita
- Original network: Tokyo Broadcasting System
- English network: Netflix
- Original run: July 10, 2018 – September 18, 2018
- Episodes: 10
- icon

Stepmom and Daughter Blues (Japanese: 義母と娘のブルース, Hepburn: Gibo to Musume no Burūsu) is a Japanese manga series by the Sakurazawa Suzu. The series was serialized on Shunin ga Yuku! Special magazine by Bunkasha. It run from February 2011 to June 2012. It has published 2 tankōbon volumes. A television drama series adaptation was aired from July to September 2018.

== Characters ==
Akiko Iwaki (岩木亜希子, Iwaki Akiko)
Portrayed by: Haruka Ayase
Ryoichi Miyamoto (宮本良一, Miyamoto Ryōichi)
Portrayed by: Yutaka Takenouchi
Miyuki Miyamoto (宮本みゆき, Miyamoto Miyuki)
Portrayed by: Moka Kamishiraishi, Naho Yokomizo (young)
Akira Mugita (麦田章, Mugita Akira)
Portrayed by: Takeru Satoh
Hiroki (ヒロキ, Hiroki)
Portrayed by: Kai Inowaki, Daichi (young)

== Media ==
=== Manga ===
Stepmom and Daughter Blues was written by Sakurazawa Suzu. It began serialization on Shunin ga Yuku! Special magazine by Bunkasha from February 4, 2011, to June 14, 2012. It run for two volumes.

==== Volumes ====
No.	Japanese release date	Japanese ISBN
1	February 4, 2011	978-4-8211-7118-7
2	June 14, 2012	978-4-8211-7307-5

=== Drama ===
A television drama series was broadcast on Tuesday evenings by TBS from July to September 2018. It was produced by Kazutaka Iida while the script was written by Yoshiko Morishita. It was directed by Yuichiro Hirakawa and Yuji Nakamae. It was starred by Haruka Ayase and Yutaka Takenouchi. The main theme music of the drama was written by Greeeen and sung by Misia.

== Reception ==
The series won Best Picture Award at the Japanese Television Drama Academy Awards
