= Bitter Blood (2014 TV series) =

- Also known as: Partners by Blood
- Genre: Drama, mystery, comedy
- Created by: Shusuke Shizukui
- Based on: Bitā Buraddo by Shusuke Shizukui
- Written by: Shota Koyama, Hiroyuki Komine
- Directed by: Hiro Kanai, Masaki Tanimura
- Starring: Takeru Satoh, Atsuro Watabe
- Opening theme: Do You Ever Shine? by Mayday
- Country of origin: Japan
- Original language: Japanese
- No. of episodes: 11

Production
- Producer: Toshiyuki Nakano
- Running time: 54 minutes
- Production company: Fuji Television

Original release
- Network: Fuji Television
- Release: 15 April – 24 June 2014

Bitter Blood (ビター・ブラッド, Bitā Buraddo), also known as Partners by Blood, is a Japanese television drama based on the 2007 novel of the same name by Shusuke Shizukui. The series was broadcast by Fuji Television from 15 April to 24 June 2014.

== Plot ==
Natsuki Sahara (Takeru Satoh) is a rookie detective who was assigned to the Ginza Police Station, where he finds himself partnered with his estranged father Akimura Shimao (Atsuro Watabe). Natsuki is a caring emotional type, who tries to do the right thing, while his father (referred to as Gentle-san because he is always drinking Gentle coffee) is lackadaisical about his job, and largely focused on fashion. The two are generally opposite type of characters, and to heighten the friction, Natsuki holds the fact his father, Akimura abandoned his family (including his sister, Shinobu, played by Suzu Hirose) when they were young against them, they work well together in cases, successfully solving a number of crimes. The team includes judo expert Hitomi Maeda (Shiori Kutsuna), who Natsuki is attracted to, but soon finds out she is in fact attracted to his father, who is oblivious to this.

Maeda is also connected to Akiumura with her father. Her father and Akimura were working together, when he was killed by a mysterious serial killer (Kaizuka Takehisa, played by Oikawa Mitsuhiro), who kills people while listening to opera. The serial killer reappears, and the three try to arrest him.

The three work together in the investigative team at the Ginza police station, with a slightly unusual team, including Hisashi Koga "the Bachelor," Toshifumi Inaki "the Chaser," Kaoru Togashi "the Skunk," Kouji Takano, and their boss, Kensuke Kagiyama.

== Cast ==
- Takeru Satoh as Natsuki Sahara
- Atsuro Watabe as Akimura Shimao
- Shiori Kutsuna as Hitomi Maeda
- Mitsuru Fukikoshi as Toshifumi Inaki
- Tetsushi Tanaka as Hisashi Koga
- Sarutoki Minagawa as Kaoru Togashi
- Keiji Kuroki as Kōiji Takano
- Katsumi Takahashi as Kensuke Kagiyama
- Suzu Hirose as Shinobu Sahara
- Reiko Kusamura as Machi Yamamura
- Mitsuhiro Oikawa as Takehisa Kaizuka
