= We Are Aliens =

2026 Japanese-animated film

- Theatrical release poster
- Japanese: 我々は宇宙人
- Directed by: Kōhei Kadowaki
- Screenplay by: Kōhei Kadowaki
- Starring: Ryōta Bandō; Amane Okayama
- Edited by: Kōhei Kadowaki
- Music by: Yaffle
- Production company: Nothing New
- Distributed by: Toho Next
- Release dates: 14 May 2026 (Cannes); 25 September 2026 (Japan)
- Running time: 117 minutes
- Country: Japan
- Language: Japanese

We Are Aliens (Japanese: 我々は宇宙人, Hepburn: Wareware wa Uchūjin) is a 2026 Japanese animated film written and directed by Kōhei Kadowaki.

The film had its world premiere in the Directors' Fortnight section of the 2026 Cannes Film Festival on 14 May. It was theatrically released in Japan by Toho Next on 25 September

== Voice cast ==
Character	Japanese
Tsubasa	Ryōta Bandō; Yūto Maki (young)
Gyōtarō	Amane Okayama; Tasuku Nakagome (young)
Konatsu	Ten Yamasaki; Saki Suzuki (young)
Batahara	Kemuri Matsui; Haru Suenaga (young)
Seiya Toda	Gaku Sano; Reika Ōzeki (young)
Elmo Matsushita	Arisa Sasaki
Calligraphy Teacher	Edo Harumi

== Production ==
The film is produced and planned by Nothing New and directed and written by Kōhei Kadowaki, with Miyu Productions credited for production cooperation and Yaffle as music composer. Ryōta Bandō and Amane Okayama were cast in the lead roles. The film's theme song is "Sasakure" (Split) performed by Adieu.

== Release ==
The film premiered at the Directors' Fortnight section of the 2026 Cannes Film Festival on 14 May, and was distributed by Toho Next and Nothing New, released the film in theaters on 25 September 2026.

The film competed in Official Competition at the 2026 Annecy International Animation Film Festival in June 2026, and in Asian Feature Film Competition of 37th Singapore International Film Festival on 28 October, vying for Silver Screen Awards.

== Reception ==
The film was called bitter and funny by Actu.fr and bordering on the tragic. Reviews noted that the film addressed themes like bullying and betrayal and the interesting use of rotoscopy and live-action images.

=== Accolades ===
Name of the award ceremony, year presented, category, nominee of the award, and the result of the nomination
Award	Date of ceremony	Category	Recipient(s)	Result	Ref.
Hochi Film Awards	December 2026	Best Animated Picture	We Are Aliens	Pending	
Nikkan Sports Film Awards	27 December 2026	Best Newcomer	Kōhei Kadowaki	Pending	
