= The Obsessed (novel) =

Novel by Shinji Ishii

- Novel volume cover

トリツカレ男
- Novel
- Written by: Shinji Ishii
- Published by: Biriken Shuppan
- Published: October 1, 2001
- Novel
- Written by: Shinji Ishii
- Published by: Shinchosha
- Imprint: Shincho Bunko
- Published: March 28, 2006
- Anime film
- Directed by: Wataru Takahashi
- Written by: Naoyuki Miura
- Music by: Atagi (Awesome City Club)
- Studio: Shin-Ei Animation
- Released: November 7, 2025
- Runtime: 97 minutes

The Obsessed (トリツカレ男, Toritsukare Otoko; lit. 'Obsessed Man') is a Japanese novel written by Shinji Ishii. The novel was originally published online through Biriken Shuppan in October 2001, and was later published in print by Shinchosha under their Shincho Bunko imprint in March 2006. A musical anime film adaptation produced by Shin-Ei Animation premiered in Japan in November 2025.

== Summary ==
Giuseppe is a man who becomes quickly obsessed with hobbies, hyper-fixating on them for a short while before becoming obsessed with a new hobby.

While out trying to catch a blue butterfly, he notices a balloon seller in a local park and falls head-over-heels in love with her.

== Characters ==
Giuseppe (ジュゼッペ, Juzeppe)
Voiced by: Masaya Sano (Ae! Group)
Pechka (ペチカ, Pechika)
Voiced by: Moka Kamishiraishi
Cielo (シエロ, Shiero)
Voiced by: Hayato Kakizawa
Boss Twist (ツイスト親分, Tsuisuto Oyabun)
Voiced by: Takahiro Yamamoto
Boss Salsa (サルサ親分, Sarusa Oyabun)
Voiced by: Shinji Kawada
Pechka's mother (ペチカの母, Pechika no Haha)
Voiced by: Nana Mizuki
Dadan (タタン, Tatan)
Voiced by: Toshiyuki Morikawa

== Media ==
=== Novel ===
| No. | Release date | ISBN |
|---|---|---|
| 1 | March 28, 2006 | 978-4-10-106923-4 |

=== Anime film ===
A musical anime film adaptation was announced on May 21, 2025. The film is produced by Shin-Ei Animation and directed by Wataru Takahashi, from a screenplay written by Naoyuki Miura, characters designed by Masatsugu Arakawa, and music composed by atagi from Awesome City Club. It was released in Japan by Bandai Namco Filmworks on November 7, 2025. The film's ending theme is "Fanfare" (ファンファーレ) performed by Awesome City Club, while the film features five original songs such as "Fanfare: Koi ni Ukarete" (ファンファーレ～恋に浮かれて～; Fanfare: Giddy in Love) performed by Masaya Sano of Ae! Group and Moka Kamishiraishi as their respective main characters.
