= Moka Kamishiraishi =

Japanese actress, voice actress, and singer (born 2000)

- 上白石萌歌
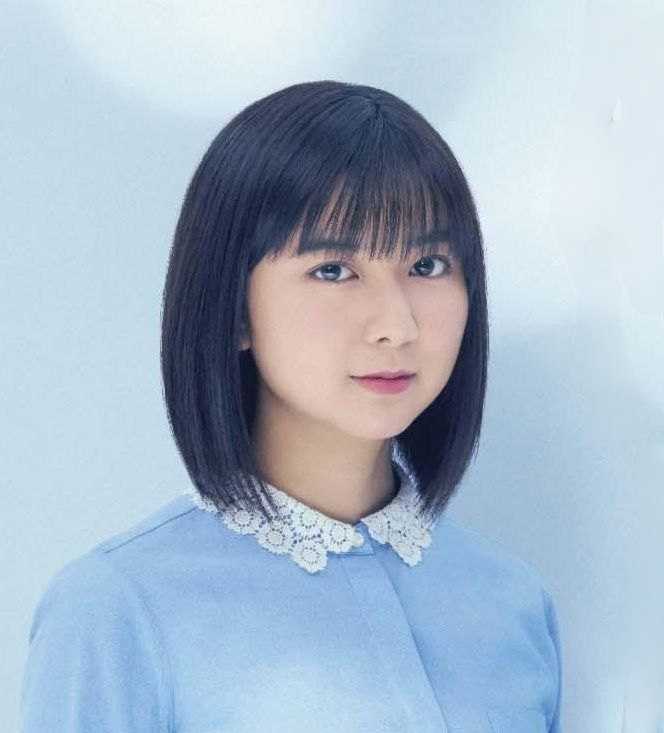
- Kamishiraishi in 2019
- Born: February 28, 2000 (age 26); Kagoshima, Japan
- Education: Meiji Gakuin University
- Occupations: Actress; voice actress; singer
- Years active: 2011–present
- Agent: Toho Entertainment
- Notable work: A Forest of Wool and Steel; Mirai
- Height: 163 cm (5 ft 4 in)
- Relatives: Mone Kamishiraishi (sister)
- Musical career
- Also known as: Adieu
- Genre: J-pop
- Years active: 2015–present
- Label: Sony Music Labels
- Website: Toho profile; Adieu official website

Moka Kamishiraishi (Japanese: 上白石萌歌, Hepburn: Kamishiraishi Moka; born February 28, 2000) is a Japanese actress, voice actress, and singer. As a singer, her stage name is Adieu (stylized in all lowercase). She is the younger sister of actress Mone Kamishiraishi.

Kamishiraishi entered the entertainment industry after winning the Toho Cinderella Audition in 2011 and is represented by Toho Entertainment. She made her acting debut in 2012, and has since appeared in films such as Haruta & Chika (2017) and A Forest of Wool and Steel (2018), for which she won a Newcomer of the Year award at the 42nd Japan Academy Film Prize. Her voice acting works include Mirai (2018) and Pokémon the Movie: Secrets of the Jungle (2020), and she has also appeared in numerous television dramas, including the NHK taiga drama Idaten (2019) and The Files of Young Kindaichi (2022). She released her first music single in 2015, and made her full music debut as Adieu in 2019 under Sony Music Labels.

== Early life ==
Kamishiraishi was born and raised in Kagoshima Prefecture. She lived in Mexico with her family for three years from the first grade of elementary school, where she was "constantly surrounded" by mariachi culture and attended a concert of her father's favorite band, The Police, as her first concert.

== Career ==
=== 2011–2014: Joining Toho, television and modelling debut ===
In 2011, when Kamishiraishi was in the fifth grade of elementary school, she applied for the 7th Toho Cinderella Audition, following her older sister Mone. At the age of 10, she was selected as the youngest ever Grand Prix winner out of 44,120 applicants and became a member of Toho Entertainment's Cinderella Room along with Mone, who won the Judges' Special Award. She began her career as an exclusive model for the fashion magazine Pichi Lemon in the September 2011 issue. She travelled back and forth between Kagoshima and Tokyo for work until she moved to Tokyo in her second year of middle school.

Kamishiraishi made her television series debut in the 2012 drama Bunshin, broadcast on Wowow. In 2014, she appeared in the first episode of the fourth Kindaichi series installment, The Files of Young Kindaichi Neo, as the "Silver Screen Killer".

=== 2015–2017: Music and theater debut, Kirin commercial series, Haruta & Chika ===
Kamishiraishi made her CD debut in June 2015 with the theme song "Su-ma-i-ru" ("Smile") for the NHK Educational TV animated series Hanakappa. Two years later, she sang the theme song "Narratage" for the film of the same title, written and composed by Yojiro Noda of Radwimps, under the stage name "Adieu". Adieu was described only as "a 17-year-old girl attending a high school in Tokyo" and her face was obscured in all promotional materials. It was released as a single on October 4, 2017 and the music video was directed by Isao Yukisada. She would later reveal that the name, which means "farewell" in French, was inspired by the film's theme of parting ways.

In August 2016, Kamishiraishi made her first stage play appearance in the Tours Musical troupe production of Anne of Green Gables, becoming the youngest actress ever in the troupe to play main character Anne Shirley, who had also been portrayed by Mone the previous year. The next year, she made her feature film debut in Haruta & Chika and became friends with female lead Kanna Hashimoto. She also starred in the musical adaptation of Kiki's Delivery Service as main character Kiki, and played the lead character in an original stage sequel of The Girl Who Leapt Through Time.

Kamishiraishi appeared in a series of commercials for Kirin Company's Gogo no Kocha bottled tea, titled Aitai tte, Atatametaida (あいたいって、あたためたいだ, "I Want to See You and Get Warm"), from 2016 until 2018. The series featured her character covering popular songs, such as "Yasashii Kimochi" by Chara, "Kabutomushi" by Aiko, "Kaede" by Spitz, and "366 Days" by HY.

=== 2018: A Forest of Wool and Steel and Mirai ===
Kamishiraishi co-starred in a film with her sister for the first time in A Forest of Wool and Steel. For this film, she won a 42nd Japan Academy Film Prize for Newcomer of the Year.

The animated film Mirai, in which Kamishiraishi voiced main character Kun Ota, was selected for the Directors' Fortnight at the 2018 Cannes Film Festival, and she attended the official screening. The film would also be nominated in the animated film categories of the 91st Academy Awards and 76th Golden Globe Awards. Director Mamoru Hosoda later directed the new title sequence of the Nippon TV program Friday Road Show!, with the concept of a girl who is visiting a salon in a foreign country and Kamishiraishi performing its theme song "Era".

Kamishiraishi also appeared in the TBS drama Stepmom and Daughter Blues as the adopted daughter of the main character. She cited the series in a 2021 interview as her "turning point", as she felt it pulled her out of her shyness at the time.

In November, Kamishiraishi sang a new version of "Paprika" arranged by Yoko Kanno, which was released on NHK's website and YouTube. It was used in the NHK BS1 broadcast of Legends on Ice on November 11, commemorating the 40th NHK Trophy.

=== 2019: NHK historical drama, Adieu full debut ===
Kamishiraishi made her first appearance in an NHK taiga drama as Olympic gold medalist Hideko Maehata in Idaten. In addition to practicing swimming for the role, she underwent physical transformation to an athlete's body shape by gaining 7 kg in weight. The same year, she also portrayed high school swimmer Reina Kageyama in the drama series Mr. Hiiragi's Homeroom.

On September 6, Kamishiraishi revealed herself as Adieu and announced the commencement of her music career in earnest under that name. Writing for The First Times, Akiko Watabe described Adieu as an emotional, "late-night" persona, in contrast to Kamishiraishi's "daytime" role as an actress portraying others; Kamishirashi herself described singing as an expression of her "true self" and expressed a desire for her music to provide companionship during moments of "loneliness and darkness". She performed the ending theme "Ao" for the TV anime Granblue Fantasy The Animation Season 2, which started airing on October 4. Adieu is the first ever performer featured on the YouTube channel The First Take, singing "Narratage" in a video published on November 15; as of February 2025, she has appeared five times on the channel. Her first mini-album adieu 1 was released on November 27 and she held her first live event "adieu secret show case [unveiling]" at the Daikanyama Loop club in Tokyo on December 19.

=== 2020–present: One Summer Story, NHK asadora and other television dramas ===
On June 30, 2021, Adieu released her second mini-album adieu 2. It was produced by Yaffle, who had also been the co-producer of "Narratage" in 2017.

In August 2021, Kamishiraishi portrayed Minami Sakuda in the film One Summer Story, adapted from the manga Kodomo wa Wakatte Agenai by Retto Tajima. Since the character is a backstroke swimmer and she has portrayed a breaststroke swimmer in Idaten and front crawl swimmer in Mr. Hiiragi's Homeroom, she remarked that if she portrayed a butterfly stroke swimmer in the future, she would achieve a unique "medley" of having portrayed characters of all four competitive swimming strokes.

Kamishiraishi appeared in her first starring role in a television drama in Solomon's Perjury (2021), broadcast on Wowow, the same station where she had made her acting debut nine years prior. She then co-starred in the fifth installment of The Files of Young Kindaichi television series (2022) as Miyuki Nanase, the childhood friend of main character Kindaichi (played by Shunsuke Michieda), becoming the first actress to portray Miyuki after playing a criminal role in a Kindaichi series in 2014. She also appeared as the main character's younger sister in the 106th NHK asadora Chimudondon, which started airing in June 2022; the previous year, her older sister Mone had starred in the previous asadora, Come Come Everybody.

In 2023, Kamishiraishi appeared in several drama series, playing detective Nao Mizuki in Outsider Cops, high school teacher Sae Hatano in the survival thriller Pending Train, and aspiring pop star Eiko Tsukimi in the live-action adaptation of Ya Boy Kongming!. She also made a guest appearance in the anthology series A Day-Off of Hana Sugisaki and played Kaori Mochizuki in the comedy film We're Millennials. Got a Problem?: The Movie.

In 2024, Kamishiraishi reprised her role as Miyuki in the final special of Stepmom and Daughter Blues and appeared in the ensemble science fiction drama Messou mo Nai. As Adieu, she released her fourth EP adieu 4 in October 2024 and collaborated with the band Skirt on the theme song for the film Swimming in a Sand Pool, "Waveless Summer" (波のない夏, Nami no Nai Natsu).

Kamishiraishi appeared in several films in 2025, including 366 Days, based on the same HY song she had covered for the 2018 Gogo no Kocha commercial. She reprised her role as Eiko Tsukimi in the feature film adaptation of Ya Boy Kongming! and starred in the film adaptation of Romantic Killer as lead character Anzu Hoshino. She also voiced the heroine Pechka in the animated film The Obsessed. As Adieu, she collaborated with singer-songwriter Satoko Shibata to release the digital single "Genki?" in September 2025, in commemoration of the 70th anniversary of the Kanro confectionery company. She also returned to the stage, appearing in Masaaki Akahori's theatrical production Shindo 3.

In 2026, Kamishiraishi starred in the Nippon TV terrestrial drama series We're Worse at Love Than Pandas as Ichiyo Shibata, her first starring role in a terrestrial television drama. Adieu's fifth EP, adieu 5, was released in April accompanied by her solo live concert "adieu Live 2026 bleuir" at KT Zepp Yokohama, and she performed "Hangnail" (ささくれ, Sasakure), the theme song for the animated film We Are Aliens. She also performed in the stage play Daichi no Ko at the Meiji-za theater in Tokyo.

== Artistry ==
Kamishiraishi has stated that music, cinema, and novels have often helped her in her teenage years and her career is a way of giving back. She feels that cinema and music are "strongly intertwined" within her and she has often discovered new music through films. She discovered The Cure in a film soundtrack, which became her gateway into British rock artists like David Bowie, whom she also found through the 1986 French film Mauvais Sang, and The Smiths. She named Kaneko Ayano as a "singing muse", whose live performance she attended regularly and who inspired her to learn the guitar, and American artist Clairo as inspiration for fashion aesthetics. She has also stated that her "goal" is to appear in a production with theme song by Spitz.

On her cinematic influences, Kamishiraishi has revealed that she watches the 1994 film Chungking Express by Hong Kong director Wong Kar-wai "about 10 times a year", and had wanted to work with Shūichi Okita for years before collaborating with him on One Summer Story. She also named Leos Carax, director of Mauvais Sang, as her favorite.

When working with song demos from other songwriters, Adieu would initially imitate that songwriter's vocal characteristics, then experiment until she finds her own interpretation. Mikiki remarked that working with many songwriters with diverse styles has allowed her voice to develop in many different situations, comparing her artistic identity to a plot of soil gradually transformed by the different seeds grown on it.

== Personal life ==
Kamishiraishi lives with her older sister by two years, Mone Kamishiraishi. She gets along well with her sister and considers her both a rival and comrade. Their father is a social studies teacher and their mother is a former music teacher and piano instructor. She went to a high school that required rigorous regular examinations and credits, aiming to commit to both her studies and work. In 2018, she enrolled in Meiji Gakuin University, where she majored in humanities and studied art theory, sociology, and photography history; she graduated in March 2023.

Her interests include singing, running, photography, and visiting museums. Around the third year of junior high school, she became interested in analog cameras and was taught by Yuina Kuroshima, with whom she co-starred in the dramas Goodbye, Debussy and Chimudondon.

Kamishiraishi has been interested in marine life since childhood and has considerable knowledge on the subject. She has revealed that she would have pursued an academic career in fisheries science if she did not enter the entertainment industry.

== Filmography ==
=== Film ===
Kamishiraishi's film appearances
Year	Title	Role	Notes	Ref(s)
2017	Haruta & Chika	Taeko Yonezawa		
2018	A Forest of Wool and Steel	Yuni Sakura		
2018	Mirai	Kun Ota (voice)	Lead role	
2018	Real Girl	Sumie Ayado		
2020	Pokémon the Movie: Secrets of the Jungle	Koko (voice)		
2021	One Summer Story	Minami Sakuta	Lead role	
2022	Kappei	Haru Yamase		
2022	Akira and Akira	Kanna Mizushima		
2023	We're Millennials. Got a Problem?: The Movie	Kaori Mochizuki		
2025	366 Days	Miu Tamashiro		
2025	Ya Boy Kongming! The Movie	Eiko Tsukimi		
2025	Romantic Killer	Anzu Hoshino	Lead role	
2025	The Obsessed	Pechka (voice)		

=== Dubbing ===
Kamishiraishi's Japanese dubbing roles for English-language films
Year	Title	Role	Notes	Ref(s)
2022	Ghostbusters: Afterlife	Phoebe (Mckenna Grace)		
2024	Ghostbusters: Frozen Empire	Phoebe (Mckenna Grace)		

=== Television dramas ===
Kamishiraishi's television drama roles
Year	Title	Role	Notes	Ref(s)
2014	The Files of Young Kindaichi Neo	Chiemi Yusa	Episode 1	
2016	Goodbye, Debussy: Pianist Detective, Yosuke Misaki	Lucia Katagiri		
2018	Stepmom and Daughter Blues	Miyuki Miyamoto		
2019	Idaten	Hideko Maehata	Taiga drama	
2019	Mr. Hiiragi's Homeroom	Reina Kageyama		
2020	Stepmom and Daughter Blues 2020 Happy New Year Special	Miyuki Miyamoto	Television film	
2021	Solomon's Perjury	Ryōko Fujino	Lead role	
2022	Stepmom and Daughter Blues 2022 Happy New Year Special	Miyuki Miyamoto	Television film	
2022	The Files of Young Kindaichi	Miyuki Nanase		
2022	Chimudondon	Utako Higa	Asadora	
2023	A Day-Off of Hana Sugisaki	Mizuki	Episode 1	
2023	Outsider Cops	Nao Mizuki		
2023	Pending Train	Sae Hatano		
2023	Ya Boy Kongming!	Eiko Tsukimi		
2024	Stepmom and Daughter Blues Final (2024 Happy New Year Special)	Miyuki Miyamoto	Television film	
2024	Messou mo Nai	Matsuoka		
2025	Ignite	Mari Inoo		
2026	We're Worse at Love Than Pandas	Ichiyo Shibata	Lead role	

=== Television programs ===
Kamishiraishi's variety show appearances
Year	Title	Role	Notes	Ref(s)
2024	Wan Nyan Ninoland	Narrator		

== Discography ==
Adieu discography
- EPs: 5
- Singles: 4

=== Singles ===
Music videos
- "Narratage" on YouTube
- "Anarchy Sky" on YouTube
- "Wanna Me" on YouTube

Kamishiraishi's singles with physical media releases
Year	Title	Peak chart positions	Notes	Ref(s)
Year	Title	JPN Oricon	Notes	Ref(s)
2015	"Su-ma-i-ru"	—	Credited as Moka Kamishiraishi	
2017	"Narratage"	19	Theme song for the film Narratage	
2022	"Anarchy Sky"	19	Yashahime: Princess Half-Demon ending song; Wordplay of Japanese title "Anaaki no Sora" (穴空きの空; lit. 'Perforated Sky')	
2026	"Wanna Me"	36	Ascendance of a Bookworm Part 3 second ending theme	

=== Digital singles ===
- "Genki?" (2025), in commemoration of the 70th anniversary of the Kanro confectionery company
- "Hangnail" (2026), We Are Aliens theme song

=== EPs ===
Kamishiraishi's EPs
Year	Title	Peak chart positions	Notes	Ref(s)
Year	Title	JPN Oricon	Notes	Ref(s)
2019	adieu 1	41		
2021	adieu 2	18		
2022	adieu 3	33		
2024	adieu 4	34		
2026	adieu 5	25		

== Theater ==
Kamishiraishi's stage play appearances
Year	Title	Role	Notes	Ref(s)
2016	Anne of Green Gables	Anne Shirley	Lead role	
2017	Kiki's Delivery Service	Kiki	Lead role	
2025	Shindo 3	Kasumi		
2026	Daichi no Ko	Jiang Yue Mei (江月梅)		

== Awards ==
Kamishiraishi's awards
Year	Award	Category	Work	Ref(s)
2011	7th Toho Cinderella Audition	Grand Prix	Herself	
2018	42nd Japan Academy Film Prize	Newcomer of the Year	A Forest of Wool and Steel	
