= Itokin =

Japanese musician (1979–2018)

Itokin いときん
- Born: 3 March 1979; Sanda, Hyōgo, Japan
- Died: 31 January 2018 (aged 38)
- Genres: J-pop
- Occupations: MC; track maker; producer
- Instrument: Vocals
- Years active: 1999–2018
- Formerly of: ET-King

Itokin (イトキン) (3 March 1979—31 January 2018) was a member of the Japanese J-pop group ET-King.

== Biography ==
Itokin was born in Sanda, Hyōgo. He graduated from Uenodai Junior High School and Arima High School, and attended college.

== Career ==
In 1999 he became a member of a band, performing as the lead guitarist. He then formed ET-king (a Japanese J-Pop group) with Tenn and Klutch. In 2005, he moved in to a shared home with seven members of ET-King. He was an MC and a producer for the group.

Acting as a leader of ET-King, his roles included track production and composition.

Since October 2012, he served as a personality on the MBS Radio program 'with...Yoru wa Radio to Kimetemasu.

== Death ==
Itokin was diagnosed with cancer in July 2017. He died from cancer at age 38 on 31 January 2018.

== Filmography ==
=== Advertisements ===
| Product | Notes |
|---|---|
| Nihonshu de Kanpai 2014 supported by Ozeki (Sun Television) | Co-starred with Cozack Maeda (GaGaGa SP) |
