= Takuya Iwasaki =

Japanese archaeologist (1929–2018)

- Born: January 9, 1929; Manchukuo
- Died: February 4, 2018 (aged 89)
- Other name: 岩崎 卓也
- Occupation: Archaeologist

Takuya Iwasaki (岩崎 卓也, Iwasaki Takuya; July 9, 1929 – February 4, 2018) was a Japanese archaeologist.

== Biography ==
He was an expert in the Neolithic and early period of the Middle East and has conducted much research at sites in countries like Syria and Iran. Iwasaki was a professor at the University of Tsukuba. Formally, from 1990, in coordination with the university, he conducted extensive field work in the Rouj Basin of northwest Syria.

Along with Akira Tsuneki, he co-wrote Archaeology of the Rouj Basin. He was involved with the Tokyo Women's College of Home Economics, and directed the Matsudo City Museum from 1993 to 2006, and The Ancient Orient Museum, Tokyo from 2006 to 2010. He was a member of the Japan Science Council. He died on February 4, 2018, at the age of 89.

== Links ==
- CiNii
