= Takeru Satoh =

Japanese actor (born 1989)

- 佐藤 健
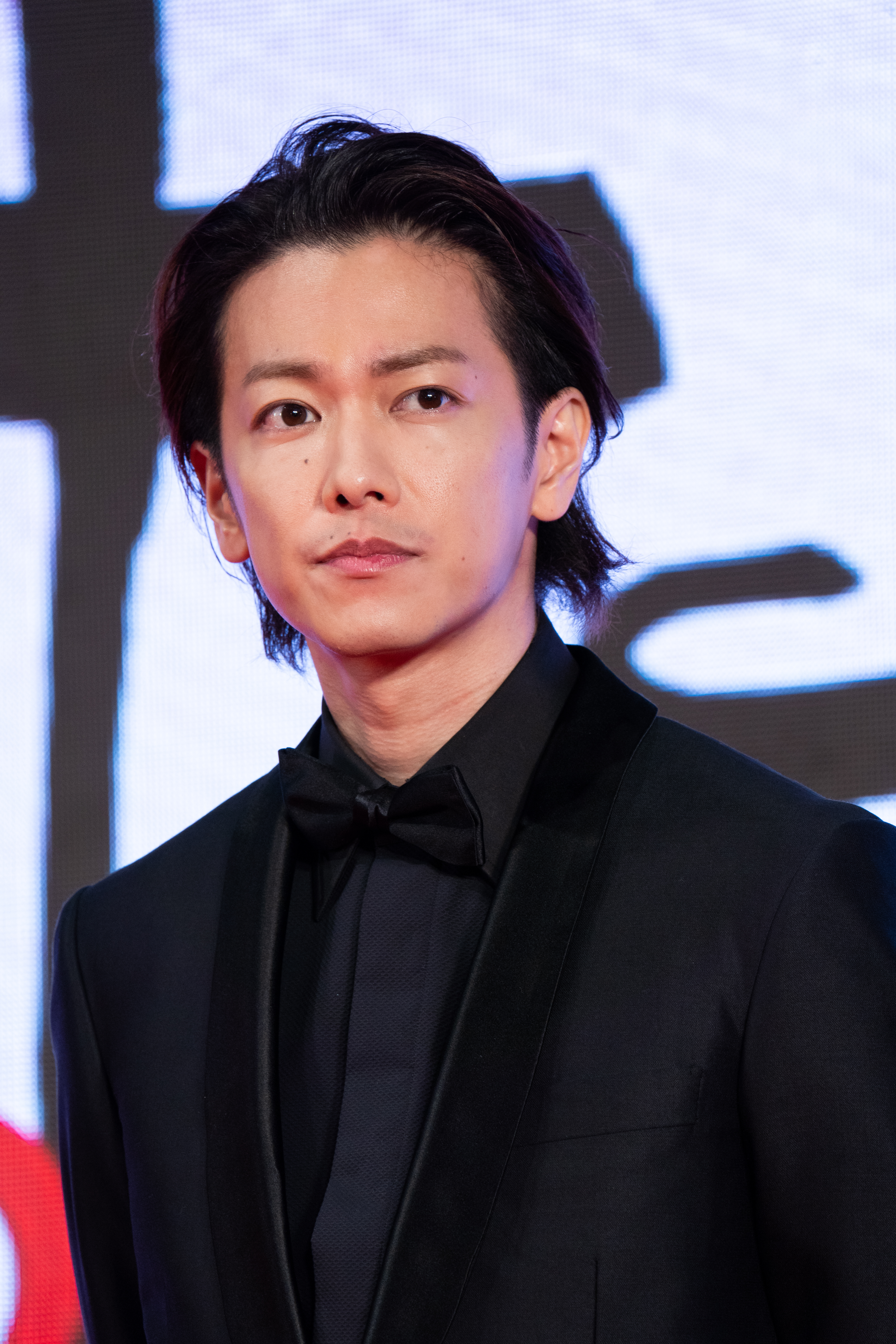
- Satoh in the Tokyo International Film Festival 2019
- Born: 21 March 1989 (age 37); Iwatsuki-ku, Saitama, Japan
- Education: Koshigaya Kita High School (Science and Mathematics)
- Occupation: Actor
- Years active: 2006–present
- Agent(s): Amuse, Inc. (2006–2021); Co-LaVo (2021–)
- Known for: Rurouni Kenshin (film); Kamen Rider Den-O
- Website: satohtakeru.com

Signature
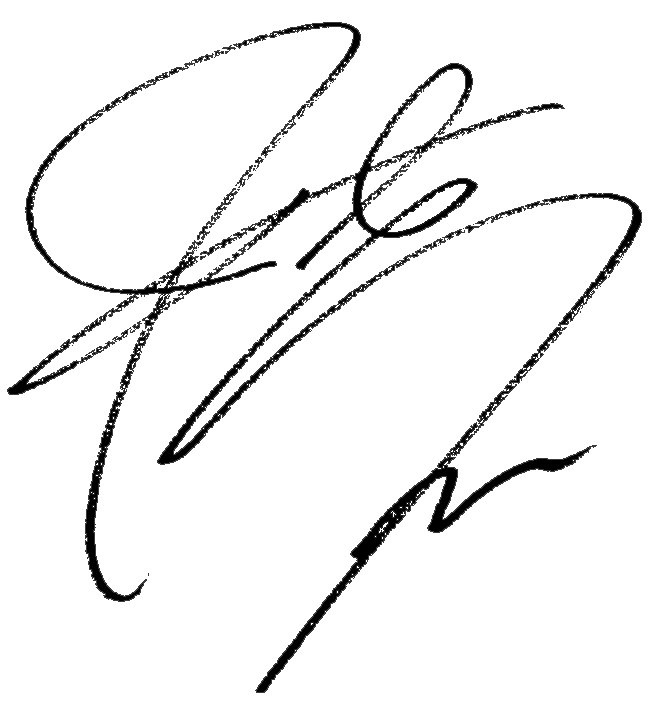

Takeru Satoh (佐藤 健, Satō Takeru; born 21 March 1989) is a Japanese actor. He is best known for his leading role as Ryotaro Nogami in the Kamen Rider Den-O franchise, and as Himura Kenshin in the live-action Rurouni Kenshin film and its sequels. In 2025, he starred in and co-executive produced the musical drama Glass Heart for Netflix.

== Early life ==
Satoh was born on March 21, 1989 in Iwatsuki-ku, Saitama. Satoh briefly worked as a child actor for three or four years, appearing in commercials and magazine photo shoots. As he advanced in elementary school, Satoh decided not to pursue work as a child actor due to his "shy personality". He graduated from Koshigaya Kita High School, Saitama in 2007. In the same year, while shooting Kamen Rider Den-O, he was diagnosed with primary pneumothorax after complaining about pain in the left chest, and has since recovered.

== Career ==
=== 2006–2008: Early works ===
Satoh was scouted by an agent from Amuse, Inc. in Harajuku in Tokyo when he was in senior high school, and made his debut in 2006. His first drama was Princess Princess D (TV Asahi) where he played the role of Toru Kouno. In 2007, he guest-starred in Shinigami no Ballad (Kentaroh Ishihara) and gained popularity in the seventeenth installment of the Kamen Rider series as Ryotaro Nogami. Satoh attributes the popularity of Den-O to its comedic timing.

=== 2009–2011: Breakthrough ===
Following the success and popularity of Kamen Rider Den-O and its two further cinematic releases, in the spring of 2008, Satoh starred in the award-winning TBS drama Rookies as Yuya Okada, one member of a high school baseball club consisting of a group of delinquents. Satoh considers his role in Rookies to be his breakout role even though he only played a minor supporting role, as Rookies was shown on prime time television and able to reach a much larger audience than any of his previous works. Satoh also starred in the live-action in the summer of 2009.

Satoh reprised his role as Ryotaro (Den-O) in the third film of Kamen Rider Den-O in October 2008. He also starred in the drama Bloody Monday, based on the manga with the same name.

In the following two years, Satoh starred or guest-starred in TV shows such as Mei's Butler, Mr. Brain, True Horror Stories and MW Dai-0-sho, and in films such as Goemon and Beck. In 2010, he played Okada Izō in his first Taiga drama Ryōmaden and landed his first leading role on prime time television with teen drama Q10.

On 28 June 2011, he was confirmed to star as Himura Kenshin in a live action film adaptation of the manga series Rurouni Kenshin.

=== 2012–present: Rurouni Kenshin films and career expansion ===
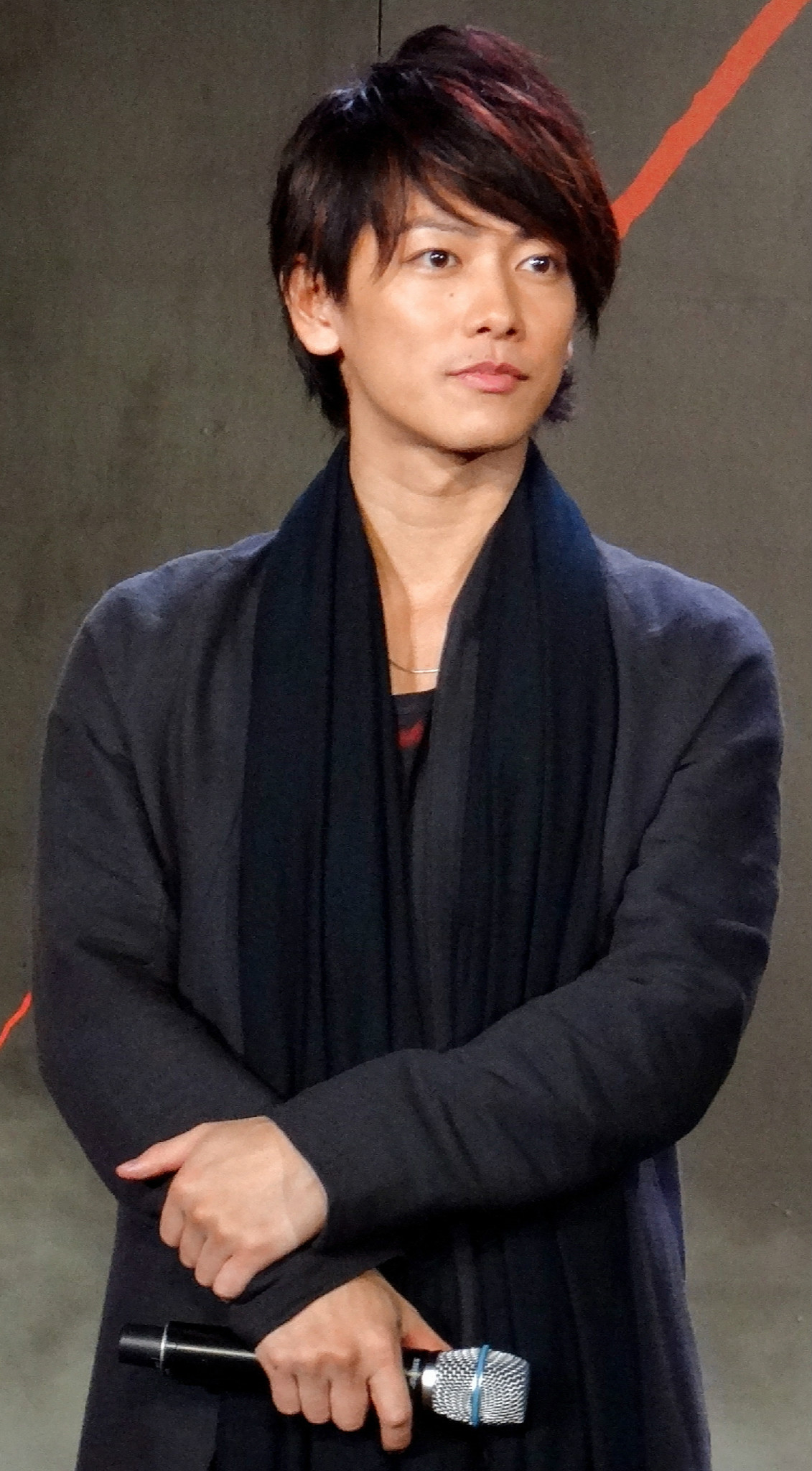
Satoh at the red carpet premiere of Rurouni Kenshin: Kyoto Inferno

Released in August 2012, the film grossed a total of 3.01 billion yen at the domestic box office. Satoh made his stage debut as Romeo in the Japanese adaptation of Shakespearean classic Romeo and Juliet in May 2012.

His subsequent project Tonbi was a drama series based on a novel by Shigematsu Kiyoshi. He then starred in Real, a science fiction mystery movie directed by Kiyoshi Kurosawa, as well as The Liar and His Lover(she fell in love with my lie/she likes lies too much), a live-adaptation film based on the manga Kanojo wa Uso o Aishisugiteru.

In 2014, Satoh played the role of a rookie detective in Fuji TV's Bitter Blood. He reprised the role of Himura Kenshin in two sequel films of Rurouni Kenshin live action franchise, Kyoto Inferno and The Legend Ends, both of which were released in 2014. Rurouni Kenshin manga author Nobuhiro Watsuki praised Satoh's performance and called him the ideal actor to portray Kenshin. He, alongside Rurouni Kenshin co-stars Emi Takei, Munetaka Aoki, and director Keishi Ōtomo, was appointed as "Cultural Friendship Ambassador" to the Philippines by the Makati City council on 7 August 2014.

Satoh made his TV return with the acclaimed TBS series The Emperor's Cook in early 2015. He followed up with three Toho Corporation films in 2015 and 2016, including the manga live adaptation Bakuman, the light novel adaptation If Cats Disappeared from the World, and Someone. His role in the 2017 film The 8-Year Engagement earned him a nomination for best actor at the 41st Japan Academy Prize. In 2018, he starred in two award-winning television series: NHK's Asadora Half Blue Sky and the TBS series Stepmom and Daughter Blues. In the same year, he reprised the role of Ryotaro Nogami in the last Kamen Rider movie of the Heisei period.

In 2018, it was announced that the Rurouni Kenshin series would be getting two further installments, a prequel and a sequel to the original trilogy, with Satoh reprising his lead role. Principal filming wrapped in June 2019, with the movies being screened in 2020.

In 2021, Satoh, along with One OK Rock and Ryunosuke Kamiki left Amuse, Inc. and established a new agency with co-actor, Ryunosuke Kamiki, called Co-LaVo. He is also an unofficial member of the Elite Four in the Pokémon Trading Card Game since 14 December 2021.

== Personal life ==
Takeru has a younger sister. His parents divorced when he was in middle school. He played baseball during primary and middle school years and has a black belt in Shorinji Kempo.

== Filmography ==
=== Film ===
Year	Title	Role	Notes	Ref.
2007	Kamen Rider Den-O: I'm Born!	Ryotaro Nogami/Kamen Rider Den-O	Lead role	
2008	Kamen Rider Den-O & Kiva: Climax Deka	Ryotaro Nogami/Kamen Rider Den-O	Lead role	
2008	Saraba Kamen Rider Den-O: Final Countdown	Ryotaro Nogami/Kamen Rider Den-O	Special appearance	
2009	Goemon	Young Kirigakure Saizō		
2009	Rookies: Graduation	Yuya Okada		
2010	Trick The Movie: Psychic Battle Royale	Shohei Nakamori		
2010	Beck	Yukio "Koyuki" Tanaka		
2012	Rurouni Kenshin	Kenshin Himura	Lead role	
2013	Real	Koichi Fujita	Lead role	
2013	The Liar and His Lover	Aki Ogasawara	Lead role	
2014	Rurouni Kenshin: Kyoto Inferno	Kenshin Himura	Lead role	
2014	Rurouni Kenshin: The Legend Ends	Kenshin Himura	Lead role	
2015	Pieta in the Toilet	The Janitor	Cameo	
2015	Bakuman	Moritaka Mashiro	Lead role	
2016	If Cats Disappeared from the World	Postman / Devil	Lead role	
2016	Someone	Takuto Ninomiya	Lead role	
2017	Ajin: Demi-Human	Kei Nagai	Lead role	
2017	The 8-Year Engagement	Hisashi	Lead role	
2018	Inuyashiki	Hiro Shishigami		
2018	Million Dollar Man	Kazuo	Lead role	
2018	Hardcore	Sakon Gondoh		
2018	Kamen Rider Heisei Generations Forever	Ryotaro Nogami		
2019	Samurai Marathon	Jin'nai Karasawa	Lead role	
2019	Dragon Quest: Your Story	Ruka (voice)	Lead role	
2019	One Night	Yūji	Lead role	
2020	Not Quite Dead Yet	Club Host	Cameo	
2021	Rurouni Kenshin: The Final	Kenshin Himura	Lead role	
2021	Rurouni Kenshin: The Beginning	Kenshin Himura	Lead role	
2021	Belle	The Dragon (voice)		
2021	In the Wake	Yasuhisa Tone	Lead role	
2024	April Come She Will	Shun Fujishiro	Lead role	
2024	Cells at Work!	Neutrophil / White blood cell (U-1146)	Lead role	
2026	May It Reach Your World	Tamaki	Lead role; Japanese-Korean film	
2026	Kung Fu Soccer	Taiga team coach	Special appearance; Chinese film	

=== Television ===
Year	Title	Role	Notes	Ref.
2006	Princess Princess D	Toru Kono		
2007	Ballad of a Shinigami	Kantaroh Ichihara	Episodes 7, 8, & 11	
2007–2008	Kamen Rider Den-O	Ryotaro Nogami/Kamen Rider Den-O	Lead role	
2008	Rookies	Yuuya Okada		
2008–2010	Bloody Monday	Otoya Kujo	2 seasons	
2009	Mei's Butler	Kento Shibata		
2009	Mr. Brain	Masaru Nakagawa	Episodes 4 & 5	
2009	MW Chapter 0: Akuma no Game	Takashi Morioka	Lead role	
2009	True Horror Stories: 10th-year Anniversary Special	Shotaro Fujisawa	Episode 5: Face on the Road	
2010	Ryōmaden	Okada Izō	Taiga drama	
2010	Q10	Heita Fukai	Lead role	
2011	Fuyu no Sakura	Hajime Inaba		
2011	Saigo no Kizuna: Okinawa Hikisakareta Kyodai	Agarie Yasuharu	Lead role	
2013	Tonbi	Akira Ichikawa		
2013	The Liar and his Lover: Side Story	Aki Ogasawara	Lead role	
2014	Bitter Blood	Natsuki Sahara	Lead role	
2015	The Emperor's Cook	Tokuzo Akiyama	Lead role	
2018	Half Blue Sky	Ritsu Hagio	Asadora	
2018	Stepmom and Daughter Blues	Akira Mugita		
2019	True Horror Stories: 20th-year Anniversary Special	Satoshi Miyazaki	Episode 5: The Resentful Gaze	
2020	Stepmom and Daughter Blues: New Year Special	Akira Mugita		
2020	Stepmom and Daughter Blues: Akira Mugita Side Story	Akira Mugita	Lead role	
2020	An Incurable Case of Love	Kairi Tendo		
2022	Stepmom and Daughter Blues: New Year Special 2022	Akira Mugita	Television film	
2022	First Love	Harumichi Namiki	Lead role	
2023	Why Didn't I Tell You a Million Times?	Naoki Torino		
2024	Stepmom and Daughter Blues Final: New Year Special 2024	Akira Mugita	Television film	
2025	Marry My Husband	Suzuki Wataru	Lead role	
2025	Glass Heart	Naoki Fujitani	Lead role, also producer	

=== Television documentaries and other programs ===
Year	Title	Role	Ref.
2012	The Man Who Wants To Be Truthful	Himself	
2016	The Unknown Civilizations	Himself	
2017	Tokyo: The Miracle City	Narrator	
2018	Our 50 Years With Weekly Shonen Jump	Narrator	
2018	69th NHK Kōhaku Uta Gassen	Judge	
2019	Tokyo Miracle	Various roles	
2021	Satoh Takeru and Nobu's Puzzle-Solving Special - Episode 1	Himself	
2021	Satoh Takeru and Nobu's Puzzle-Solving Special - Episode 2	Himself	
2022	Satoh Takeru and Nobu's Puzzle-Solving Special - Episode 3	Himself	
2022	Satoh Takeru and Nobu's Puzzle-Solving Special - Episode 4	Himself	

=== Promotion videos ===
- Bahashishi, Oasis (オアシス; 2007)
- Bahashishi, Yakusoku (約束; 2007)
- Bahashishi, Kiseki (キセキ; 2008)
- Mayday, Do You Ever Shine (2014)
- Vaundy, Boku ni wa Dōshite Wakarundarō (僕にはどうしてわかるんだろう; 2025)

=== Theater ===
- 2012: Romeo and Juliet. Dir: Jonathan Munby, Akasaka ACT Theater, Theatre Brava!; role: Romeo

== Discography ==
=== Singles ===
- "Pre-go: Zero" (2007)
- "Double-Action" (2007)
- "Perfect-Action: Double-Action Complete Collection" (2007)
- "Real-Action" (2007)
- "Double-Action Wing form" (2008)

=== DVD ===
- "My Color" (2008)
- "HT" (HT 〜 N.Y.の中心で、鍋をつつく 〜) (2010)
- "HT2" (赤道の真下で、鍋をつつく ～) (2011)

== Photobooks ==
- Pre-go: Zero (2007)
- Intently (2008)
- 400 Days (2008)
- Takeru Magazine/Takeru Magazine Plus (2008–)
- Deep Breathing (2009)
- So Far So Good! Takeru Satoh Profile 2007–2010 (2010)
- Nouvelles (2011)
- Rocka Nibunnoichi 1/2 Vol. 1, 2, and 3 (2013)
- Rurouni Kenshin (2014)
- Alternative (2014)
- If Cats Disappeared From the World (Movie) Official Photo Book (2016)
- "X (Ten)" Satoh Takeru Photo Book + DVD (2016)
- RurouNihon Kumamoto e (2017)
- Satoh Takeru in Hanbun, Aoi Photobook (2018)
- 13 Years: Takeru Satoh Anniversary Book 2006→2019～ (2019)

== Awards and nominations ==
Year	Award	Category	Notable Works	Result	Ref.
2010	20th Japan Movie Critics Award	Best Male Newcomer	Beck	Won	
2011	35th Elan d'or Awards	Newcomer of the Year	Himself	Won	
2012	Japan Action Awards 2012	Best Action Actor	Rurouni Kenshin	Won	
2015	Japan Action Awards 2015	Best Action Scene	Rurouni Kenshin: Kyoto Inferno & The Legend Ends	Won	
2015	Japan Action Awards 2015	Best Action Actor	Rurouni Kenshin: Kyoto Inferno & The Legend Ends	Won	
2015	9th Asian Film Awards	Best Actor	Rurouni Kenshin: The Legend Ends	Nominated	
2015	8th Tokyo Drama Awards	Best Actor	The Emperor's Cook	Won	
2016	24th Hashida Award	Best Actor	The Emperor's Cook	Won	
2016	42nd Broadcasting Culture Fund Award	Individual Acting Award	The Emperor's Cook	Won	
2018	41st Japan Academy Film Prize	Best Actor	The 8-Year Engagement	Nominated	
2018	Japan Action Awards 2018	Best Action Actor	Ajin: Demi-Human	Won	
2018	13th Confidence Award Drama Prize	Best Supporting Actor	Half Blue Sky, Blues of Stepmother and Daughter	Won	
2019	32nd Nikkan Sports Film Awards	Best Actor	Samurai Marathon, One Night	Nominated	
2020	13th Tokyo Drama Awards	Best Supporting Actor	An Incurable Case of Love	Won	
2021	34th Nikkan Sports Film Awards	Best Actor	Rurouni Kenshin: The Final/The Beginning, In the Wake	Nominated	
2022	76th Mainichi Film Awards	Best Actor	In the Wake	Won	
2022	64th Blue Ribbon Awards	Best Actor	Rurouni Kenshin: The Final, In the Wake	Nominated	
2022	45th Japan Academy Film Prize	Best Actor	In the Wake	Nominated	
2023	Asia Contents Awards & Global OTT Awards	Best Lead Actor	First Love	Nominated	
2025	10th Asia Artist Awards	Best Artist	Himself	Won	
2026	Visionary Awards	2026 Visionary	Himself	Won	
