= A Forest of Wool and Steel =

2018 film directed by Kojiro Hashimoto

- Film poster
- Japanese: 羊と鋼の森
- Directed by: Kojiro Hashimoto
- Screenplay by: Arisa Kaneko
- Based on: Hitsuji to Hagane no Mori by Natsu Miyashita
- Starring: Kento Yamazaki; Ryohei Suzuki; Mone Kamishiraishi; Moka Kamishiraishi; Tomokazu Miura
- Cinematography: Kosuke Yamada
- Edited by: Ryūichi Takita
- Music by: Hiroko Sebu
- Production companies: Toho; Nippon TV; Hakuhodo; Asahi Shimbun; Mainichi Shimbun; Chunichi Shimbun; Yamaha Corporation; Jiji Press; Bungeishunjū; Tohan Corporation; GyaO; KDDI Corporation; Hankyu Travel International Co., Ltd.
- Distributed by: Toho
- Release date: 8 June 2018 (Japan)
- Country: Japan
- Language: Japanese
- Box office: US$3.5 million

A Forest of Wool and Steel (Japanese: 羊と鋼の森, Hepburn: Hitsuji to Hagane no Mori; lit. 'Sheep and Steel Forest') is a 2018 Japanese drama film directed by Kojiro Hashimoto and starring Kento Yamazaki. It is based on the 2016 award-winning Booksellers novel by Natsu Miyashita, which tells the story of high school student Naoki Tomura and his ambition to become a piano tuner. An English translation of Miyashita's novel was released in April 2019.

== Plot ==
When in high school, Naoki Tomura watched a piano tuner, Soichiro Itadori, work on the school piano. He could smell the forest from the piano tuning by Soichiro. When he graduated he worked at the music instrument store where Soichiro works.

== Cast ==
- Kento Yamazaki as Naoki Tomura
- Tomokazu Miura as Soichiro Itadori
- Mone Kamishiraishi as Kazune Sakura
- Moka Kamishiraishi as Yuni Sakura
- Ryohei Suzuki as Shinji Yanagi
- Yuu Shirota as Masato Kamijyo
- Hayato Sano as Masaki Tomura
- Keiko Horiuchi as Mizuki Kitakawa
- Ken Mitsuishi as Tadashi Akino
- Riisa Naka as Eri Hamano
- Yuki Morinaga as Takashi Minami
- Kazuko Yoshiyuki as Kiyo Tomura

== Awards ==
Award	Category	Nominee	Result
42nd Japan Academy Prize	Newcomer of the Year	Moka Kamishiraishi	Won
