= Color Me True =

- Theatrical release poster

Japanese name
- Kanji: 今夜、ロマンス劇場で
- Literal meaning: Tonight, at Romance Theater
Transcriptions
- Revised Hepburn: Konya, Romansu Gekijo de
- Directed by: Hideki Takeuchi
- Written by: Keisuke Uyama
- Produced by: Juichi Uehara
- Starring: Haruka Ayase; Kentaro Sakaguchi
- Cinematography: Hideo Yamamoto
- Edited by: Hiroshi Matsuo
- Music by: Norihito Sumitomo
- Production companies: Fuji Television Network; Horipro; Dentsu; KDDI
- Distributed by: Warner Bros. Pictures
- Release date: February 10, 2018
- Country: Japan
- Language: Japanese

External videos
- Color Me True Trailer

Color Me True (Japanese: 今夜、ロマンス劇場で, Hepburn: Konya, Romansu Gekijo de), also known as Tonight, at the Movies, is a Japanese romantic-fantasy film starring Haruka Ayase and Kentaro Sakaguchi, with original screenplay by Keisuke Uyama and direction by Hideki Takeuchi. It premiered in Japan on 10 February 2018.

== Synopsis ==
The film follows the story of a young filmmaker named Kenji (Sakaguchi) and a heroine from a black and white film called Princess Miyuki (Ayase). As an aspiring director, Kenji dreamed of meeting his favourite star of the bygone '60s retro film, Princess Miyuki. Kenji is attracted to Miyuki, who appears in monochrome while he resides in the colorful real world. Through a bizarre twist of fate, Miyuki jumps out of the silver screen and joins Kenji in a world filled with colour—and she's even ballsy off screen.

== Cast ==
=== Main ===
- Haruka Ayase as Miyuki
- Kentaro Sakaguchi as Kenji

=== Supporting ===
- Tsubasa Honda as Toko Naruse
- Kazuki Kitamura as Ryunosuke Shundo
- Akiyoshi Nakao as Shintaro Yamanaka
- Anna Ishibashi
- Tokuma Nishioka
- Akira Emoto as Tadashi Honda
- Go Kato as old Kenji

== Reception ==
=== Box office ===
The film was premiered in 298 screens and opened at #1 in the box office with 193,000 admissions. By its seventh week, it had earned ¥1 billion (US$9.4 million) domestically.

== Adaptations ==
In January 2022 the film was adapted by the Takarazuka revue for the stage. A moon troupe production, the play was led by current moon troupe stars Kanato Tsukishiro as Kenji, and Mitsuki Umino as Miyuki.
