= Sakura Guardian in the North =

- DVD cover
- Directed by: Yōjirō Takita
- Screenplay by: Machiko Nasu
- Produced by: Rioko Tominaga
- Starring: Sayuri Yoshinaga; Masato Sakai; Ryoko Shinohara; Ittoku Kishibe; Reiko Takashima; Toshiyuki Nagashima; Shōfukutei Tsurube II; Masatoshi Nakamura; Hiroshi Abe; Kōichi Satō
- Cinematography: Takeshi Hamada
- Edited by: Hidemi Lee
- Music by: Kei Ogura; Katsu Hoshi; Shōgo Kaida
- Distributed by: Toei
- Release date: March 10, 2018 (Japan)
- Running time: 126 minutes
- Country: Japan
- Language: Japanese

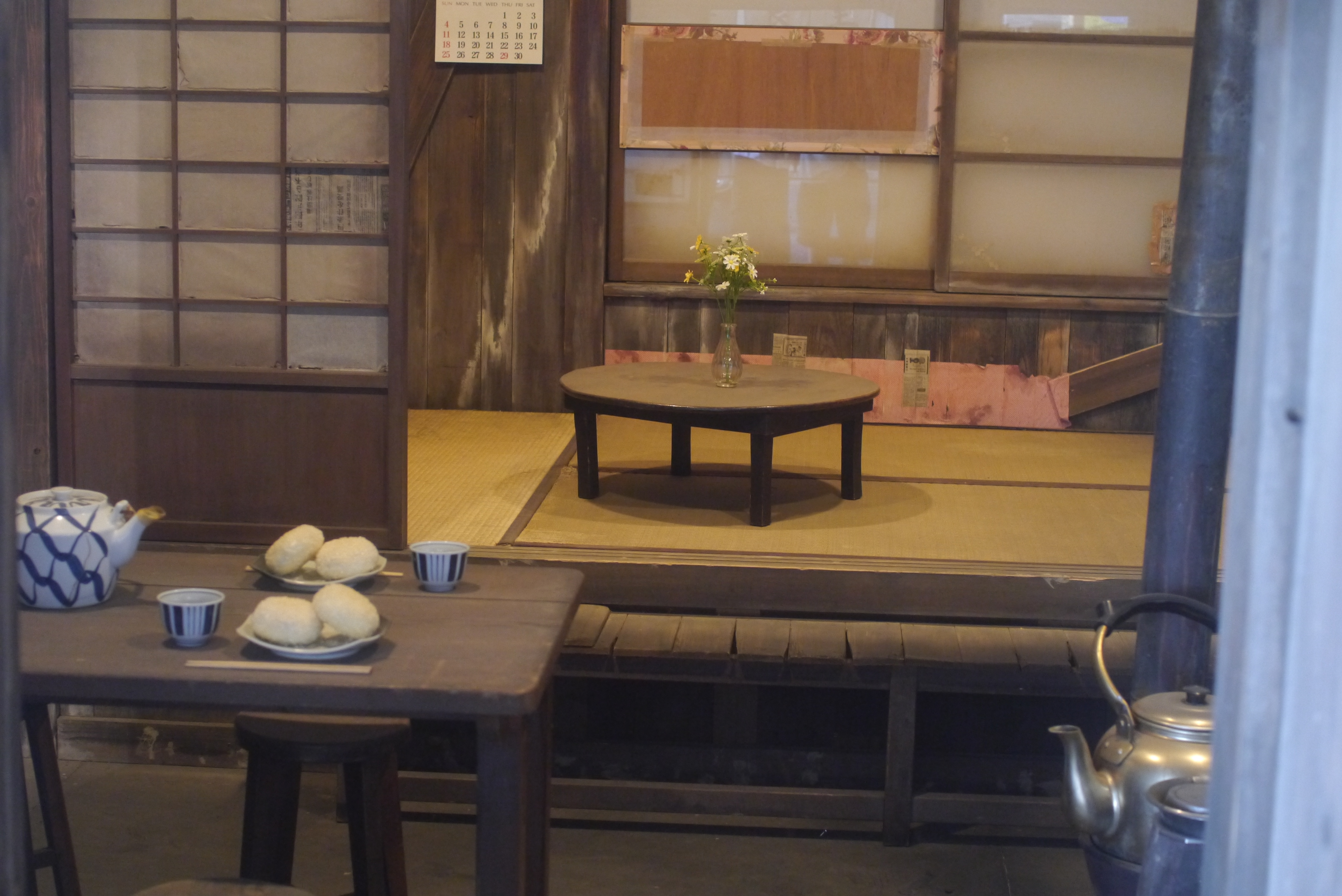
Set for the film.

Sakura Guardian in the North (Japanese: 北の桜守, Hepburn: Kita no Sakuramori) is a 2018 Japanese drama film, directed by Yōjirō Takita and written by Machiko Nasu. Stage Production was by Keralino Sandrovich, Director of Photography is Takeshi Hamada and the music was by Kei Ogura and Katsu Hoshi.

== Plot ==
The story starts in 1945, with Tetsu Ezure and her sons living in Sakhalin. The Russian army invades, and Tetsu flees with her sons, while her husband stays behind to fight. The family manages to flee to Hokkaido, and eventually settle in Abashiri. The plot then skips forward to 1971, and one of the sons, Shujiro is now an executive at a US Multi National Hot Dog sales company. While visiting Sapporo, he encounters his mother, from whom he had previously become estranged. His mother, now down on her luck, seeks his help, while he and his wife are reluctant to assist. The plot looks at the past of the family.

Upon realising something is wrong with her, partially related to her post-traumatic stress disorder, she leaves to go back to her original house in Abashii, however, it has been demolished. Shujiro, reaching out to his mother, accompanies her through the plains of Hokkaido, where they encounter stories of the past.

== Cast ==
- Sayuri Yoshinaga as Tetsu Ezure
- Masato Sakai as Shujiro Ezure
- Ryoko Shinohara as Mari Ezure
- Tsurube Shofukutei as bar owner
- Ittoku Kishibe as Kazuo Yamaoka
- Reiko Takashima as Mitsue Shimada
- Masatoshi Nakamura as Daikichi Okabe
- Ken Yasuda as Hisashi Sugimoto
- Katsuya Maiguma as Iwaki
- Tōru Nomguchi as Manabu Kimura
- Yukijirō Hotaru
- Hiroshi Abe as Tokujiro Ezure
- Koichi Sato as Shinji Sugawara

== Box office ==
The film took $2 million from 351 screens on its first weekend showing in Japan.
