= Doraemon: Nobita's Treasure Island =

2018 film by Kazuaki Imai

Doraemon the Movie: Nobita's Treasure Island
- Theatrical release poster

Japanese name
- Kanji: ドラえもん のび太の宝島
- Literal meaning: Doraemon: Nobita's Treasure Island
Transcriptions
- Revised Hepburn: Doraemon Nobita no Takarajima
- Directed by: Kazuaki Imai
- Written by: Fujiko Fujio
- Screenplay by: Genki Kawamura
- Based on: Doraemon by Fujiko Fujio Treasure Island by Robert Louis Stevenson
- Starring: Wasabi Mizuta; Megumi Ōhara; Yumi Kakazu; Tomokazu Seki; Subaru Kimura; Aoi Yūki; Daiki Yamashita; Fumiko Orikasa; Ryūzaburō Ōtomo; Saori Hayami; Masami Nagasawa
- Music by: Takayuki Hattori
- Production company: Shin-Ei Animation
- Distributed by: Toho
- Release date: March 3, 2018
- Running time: 108 minutes
- Country: Japan
- Language: Japanese
- Box office: $80.9 million

Doraemon: Nobita's Treasure Island (映画ドラえもん のび太の宝島, Doraemon Nobita no Takarajima), also known as Doraemon the Movie 2018, is a 2018 Japanese animated science fiction action-adventure film. It is the 38th Doraemon film. The story is based on Robert Louis Stevenson's 1883 novel Treasure Island, with a screenplay written by Genki Kawamura - the producer of Your Name and The Boy and the Beast. Kazuaki Imai, an episode director on the Doraemon television anime, directs the project as his first Doraemon franchise film.

== Plot ==
Upon hearing about the story of Treasure Island, Nobita dreams of discovering and exploring his own treasure island, despite the fact all of the Earth has been mapped already. Doraemon provides Nobita a special treasure map that shows him the location of a treasure island. At the same time, the media announces the discovery of a completely unknown island. Believing the new island is the treasure island, Nobita and Doraemon recruits Shizuka to accompany them, with Doraemon providing a ship. Gian and Suneo also tag along.

However, as they get near the island, they are suddenly attacked by a gang of pirates. At that moment, the island begins to move, revealing that it is a part of a massive advanced technological ship. The pirates retreat, but abduct Shizuka in the process. Nobita and his friends are unable to rescue her, but save an unconscious boy named Flock. Flock explains that the pirates that attacked them are actually time travelers, who travels to different eras and steal treasures off the sea floor. Flock reveals that he was also part of the ship's crew, but decided to desert since he couldn't accept taking orders from Captain Silver. Doraemon uses the treasure map to track the pirate ship's location.

Meanwhile on the pirate ship, Shizuka encounters Flock's sister Sarah, who looks exactly like Shizuka. Sarah agrees to help Shizuka. Flock and Sarah reveal that Silver is actually their father, who went mad when their mother died and has become obsessed with gathering as much treasure as possible. Nobita and his friends attempt a rescue operation, but end up rescuing picking up Sarah instead of Shizuka, who is taken directly to Silver. Silver moves on the final stage of his plan. Having seen humanity's destruction in the future, Silver is determined to launch his pirate ship into space and colonize a new planet with all of the treasure he has acquired. However, this requires him to drain the Earth's energy to get the power he needs to reach space.

Doraemon warns that taking Earth's energy will result in its destruction. Due to which, Nobita and his friends, along with Flock and Sarah attack the pirate ship again. Gian and Suneo stay behind to occupy the pirates while Nobita, Doraemon, Flock and Sarah confront Silver directly. While Nobita and Doraemon delay the activation of the pirate ship's engine, Flock is able to seize control of the ship and eject the energy back into Earth. Silver realizes his mistakes about neglecting his children and abandons his plans, where he promises to be a better father to them.

Afterwards, Flock, Sarah, Silver and the rest of the crew return to their own timeline while Nobita and his friends return home with Nobita gaining a new appreciation for his own father Nobisuke.

== Cast ==
Character	Japanese voice actor
Doraemon	Wasabi Mizuta
Nobita Nobi	Megumi Ōhara
Shizuka Minamoto	Yumi Kakazu
Suneo Honekawa	Tomokazu Seki
Takeshi "Gian" Gōda	Subaru Kimura
Mini-Doras	Hisako Kanemoto
Tamako Kataoka	Kotono Mitsuishi
Nobisuke Nobi	Yasunori Matsumoto
Hidetoshi Dekisugi	Shihoko Hagino
Quiz	Aoi Yūki
Flock	Daiki Yamashita
Sarah	Fumiko Orikasa
Gaga	Ryūzaburō Ōtomo
Vivi	Saori Hayami
Captain Silver	Yo Oizumi
Fiona	Masami Nagasawa
Cho	Katsumi Toriumi
Jose	Akio Suyama
Announcer	Yoshitsugu Watanabe
Cook	Kazuya Ichijo

== Release ==
This film was released on March 3, 2018, in Japan, and was later dubbed in Hindi India and released on September 11, 2022, on Hungama TV.

== Box office ==
Debuting on 381 screens with Toho distributing, Doraemon the Movie: Nobita's Treasure Island earned $7.97 million on 716,629 admissions in its first weekend and ranked number-one on Japanese box office. Its opening weekend is considered as the highest among all the films in the franchise and became the first Doraemon film to cross ¥5 billion and the highest attended film with over 4.6 million admissions.

This film opened in China on 1 June 2018 and grossed ¥83.9 million ($13 million) on its opening day. It grossed $31.12 million after 19 days of release. Its final gross in China was $31,578,357 as of July 2018. The film also grossed $1,012,837 in Hong Kong as of August 2018 and $1,221,563 in South Korea as of September 9, 2018.

== See also ==
- List of Doraemon films
