= Doraemon: Nobita's Art World Tales =

2025 film by Yukiyo Teramoto

Doraemon the Movie: Nobita's Art World Tales
- Theatrical release poster

Japanese name
- Kanji: 映画ドラえもん のび太の絵世界物語
Transcriptions
- Revised Hepburn: Eiga Doraemon Nobita no Esekai Monogatari
- Directed by: Yukiyo Teramoto
- Screenplay by: Satoshi Itō
- Based on: Doraemon by Fujiko F. Fujio
- Starring: Wasabi Mizuta; Megumi Ohara; Yumi Kakazu; Subaru Kimura; Tomokazu Seki; Misaki Watada; Atsumi Tanezaki; Misaki Kuno; Kouji Suzuka; Miki Fujimoto; Mikio Date
- Music by: Takayuki Hattori
- Production company: Shin-Ei Animation
- Distributed by: Toho
- Release date: 7 March 2025
- Running time: 104 minutes
- Country: Japan
- Language: Japanese
- Box office: $40.18 million

Doraemon the Movie: Nobita's Art World Tales (Japanese: 映画ドラえもん のび太の絵世界物語, Hepburn: Eiga Doraemon Nobita no Esekai Monogatari) is a 2025 Japanese animated science fantasy adventure film. It is the 44th Doraemon feature film. It is directed by Yukiyo Teramoto from a screenplay by Satoshi Itо̄. It was released in theaters in Japan on March 7, 2025. The film celebrates the 45th anniversary of the Doraemon film series.

== Plot ==
In the 13th century, in a stone castle on an island in the middle of a lake, princess Claire was modeling for her childhood friend Milo's painting. One day, Claire became bored and angry, entering the Lost Forest on the outskirts of the castle town, where she was suddenly sucked into a hole in space-time.

In the present day, Nobita and his friends were using a secret gadget, the "Entering Light" to enter the world of paintings to get references for their own drawings for an assignment. Ultimately, Nobita gave up and returned to his bedroom, idly throwing an eraser, when suddenly a second hole in space-time appeared; the eraser was inadverdently sent into it, and a painting fell onto Nobita's face. The painting had a girl and a bat that changed color like a hologram; Doraemon and Nobita, who were curious about it, used the "Entering Light" to enter the world of the painting in order to meet the girl in the painting.

However, Claire, the girl in the painting, happens to stumble onto the exit portal of the "Entering Light" and comes out to modern day Tokyo. A scuffle ensues when Nobita's mother sees her and is horrified at her wearing shoes in the house; her attempts to catch her cause Claire to escape away from the Nobi residence. Meanwhile, Nobita's father is watching the news, which features the painting of the lake and reports that its blue color is a special color that cannot be reproduced in present times. If a stone that can produce that color could be found, it would be worth more than a diamond.

Claire explores modern day Tokyo, finding a butterfly and chasing it. This leads her to wander onto a construction site, but luckily Shizuka, Gian, and Suneo, happen to be there to rescue her. On the way, they meet Doraemon and his friends, and they all enter Suneo's house together.

Claire reveals that she is from a place called Arturia, which confuses Doraemon and co as they have never heard of the place; Suneo is unable to find it in an encyclopedia. Claire sees a painting of a lake in the newspaper and recognises that the castle depicted in the painting is her homeland. Doraemon and his friends thus use the Entering Light to once again enter the painting that fell on Nobita's house, but are unable to find the castle. While they are lost, Nobita is attacked by a red bat named Chai. The group continues to search in the forest, but they end up at the edge of the painting, which is simply a literal sea of white. While Doraemon is at a loss, he accidentally walks into another portal, where he finds Arturia's castle.

Doraemon realizes that this is the other half of the picture that fell on Nobita's house. Since they are the same painting, when Doraemon used the Entering Light on their half, it also caused an exit portal to manifest on the other half; however this simply raises new questions as it cements that Arturia is, in fact, located in the real world, verified by another of Doraemon's gadgets that they are in Europe in the Middle Ages.

Nobita and his friends reach the shores of the lake surrounding the castle and discover that the color of the lake is that mysterious blue, Artria Blue. Claire reunites with Milo, who is drawing a picture there, but Milo has grown much taller than Claire. Milo tells them that four years have already passed since Claire vanished, though Claire hasn't aged a day. Furthermore, after Claire disappeared, a fortune teller said that it was a curse from the legendary demon Esael, and warned that his return would mean the end of the world. Milo's father, a court painter, drew a picture of Claire to appease the king and queen. Doraemon and his friends see the blueprints for the building that Milo had drawn, and used the "Water Building Construction Machine" to build the castle.

At night, Nobita sees a picture of Claire that Milo has drawn, but her eyes are not coloured yet. Milo says that Claire's eye color needs Arturia Blue, but he cannot recreate that color. When Nobita asks Milo to teach him how to draw, Milo replies, "Just draw what you love while thinking that you love it." So Nobita draws Doraemon with crayons.

The next morning, everyone heads to the castle to meet the king and queen. On the way, they meet Pal, an art dealer. When Pal finds out that Claire has returned, he compares her to "Alice in Wonderland". After meeting the king and queen, he orders his chamberlain Sodoro to take Doraemon and his friends to dinner as a token of his gratitude. As they pass through the gallery, they find a painting of Esael, a ferocious red dragon and a blue bat on either side of it. They also learn about the existence of a painting thief.

Doraemon and his friends return to the present, but one day, while Doraemon and Nobita are away, Gian and Suneo use the painting to return to Arturia. Afterwards, Claire and Chai come out of the painting to tell Nobita and his friends that Gian and Suneo have been arrested for stealing a painting. When they try to return to the castle, they are stopped by the gatekeeper and see another Claire inside the castle. Chai informs everyone Pal was watching everyone from the dark in the gallery; Doraemon realizes that Pal must be a time traveller because Alice in Wonderland was written in the 19th century, 600 years in the future from when Arturia is located.

Doraemon and his friends decide to search for Pal's house. During the search, they learn that Gian and Suneo are scheduled to be executed in Jigokudani, so Shizuka and Claire go to rescue them. Doraemon and his friends find Pal's house and use the "Tripman" (pun on hitman) to subdue Pal, but it turns out that Pal is actually a member of the Time Patrol. Meanwhile, Shizuka sees through the fake Claire and works out she is a "copy robot" being controlled by Sodoro; Sodoro is also from the future. With his true identity exposed, Sodoro takes King and Claire hostage and puts Shizuka and the others to sleep using the "Good Sleep Long Pillow" and escapes. Afterwards, Milo and Chai rush to the scene, but are also put to sleep, though Milo manages to bump Shizuka away from the pillow that she is no longer affected. Shizuka rushes back to Doraemon for help.

According to Pal, he was attempting to apprehend the painting thief Sodoro, who attempted to flee into space-time vortex and causing the painting to be bisected when the space-time portal prematurely closed on it. Flying through temporal turbulence, a region of the vortex where portals to random points in history open, Sodoro by chance passed by a portal that led to Nobita's bedroom at the exact time Nobita was tossing the eraser around, which led to him being bonked by the eraser and dropping the painting.

Doraemon, Nobita, and Pal try to catch Sodro and rescue the King and Claire. Sodoro argues that he is in fact doing a good deed since Arturia will be destroyed by a volcano eventually (hence why the place is not in the history books; it was simply a kingdom lost to time) and he was thus rescuing the paintings from being gone forever but none of the three are buying it. So Sodoro steals the Entering Light and uses it to unleash Esael from the painting, who promptly turns Sodoro into stone. Eseal gets ahold of the Entering Light and releases a horde of demons from the same painting where he came; Doraemon and co engage with the demons, discovering that, since they are ultimately from a painting, they are made of oil and dissolve when coming into contact with water. Switching to water pistols Doraemon and co seem to turn the tide, but Eseal uses the Entering Light again, this time on the painting of the red dragon, which unleashes the final creature prophesized to destroy Arturia.

Esael turns Shizuka, Suneo, Gian, and Claire to stone one by one; Doraemon uses the Staff of Moses to split the lake in twain while Nobita and Milo attempt to lure the dragon into the now-dry lakebed with the picture of Doraemon that Nobita had drawn, intending to close it on the beast and vanquish it once and for all; they succeed in the former but Eseal manages to freeze the water into stone before it could fully close on him.

Doraemon comes up with a plan, but is turned to stone during the attack. Nobita avoids Esael's attacks and enters the picture of Doraemon he drew, and obtains a secret gadget from Doraemon in the picture. The gadget is a " water-processing sprinkle." Using a slingshot drawn by Milo with " real crayons," Nobita shoots the "water-processing sprinkle" into the building. The building turns back into water, dissolving Esael. Color returns to the world, and everyone is unpetrified. Chai returns with a blue stone, and after a second quick use of the Staff of Moses the group discover a mineral at the bottom of the lake that produces Artoria Blue, the source of the elusive blue color that Milo needs to paint Claire's eyes.

With Eseal dissolved the Entering Light that he had taken emerges at the surface of the lake; the water damage causes it to short out. This has the side effect of making Chai disappear, because he was ultimately a being brought to life by the gadget. However, Claire also begins to fade, and it turns out that she was in fact not the real Claire but a painting of her.

Doraemon and co break the sad news to the king and queen, who are in mourning. However, Pal shows up and brings in a person: it is Claire, who is now 10 years old. Pal found her in the space-time hole and rescued her. Claire does not know Doraemon and his friends, but she says that she remembers everything that happened in a dream-like sequence she had when she was 6 years old.

Back in the present day, the news reports that a new painting has been discovered. It is the painting of Claire and Chai in the forest that had once fallen onto Nobita. However, Doraemon, Gian, Suneo, Shizuka, and Nobita have also been added. The news also reports that a "child's graffiti" from the Middle Ages has been discovered, which is actually the drawing of Doraemon drawn by Nobita. Nobita is annoyed when critics say that the painting has no value, but Nobita's father says that the painting conveys the artist's feelings in drawing something he likes, and praises it as a good painting, motivating Nobita to try a new painting of his dad.

== Cast ==
Character	Japanese voice actor
Doraemon	Wasabi Mizuta
Nobita	Megumi Ōhara
Shizuka	Yumi Kakazu
Gian	Subaru Kimura
Suneo	Tomokazu Seki
Tamako Nobi (Nobita's Mama)	Kotono Mitsuishi
Nobisuke Nobi (Nobita's Papa)	Yasunori Matsumoto
Claire	Misaki Watada
Milo	Atsumi Tanezaki
Chai	Misaki Kuno
Pal	Kouji Suzuka
Queen Arturia	Miki Fujimoto
King Arturia	Mikio Date
Critic	Takeshi Tomizawa
Sodro	Kazuhiro Yamaji
Isere	Kōji Ishii
Minotaur	Shinnosuke Hai

== Production ==
=== Development ===
Yukiyo Teramoto, who directed Doraemon: Nobita's New Great Adventure into the Underworld (2007), Doraemon: Nobita and the New Steel Troops—Winged Angels (2011) and Doraemon: Nobita's Secret Gadget Museum (2013), returned to direct the film.

=== Screenwriting ===
Yukiyo Teramoto, who was offered the opportunity to make a film based on a painting, worked with Satoshi Itō and others to shape the story. In the process, the idea of "wouldn't it be interesting if we could do various things in the world of a painting, like Doraemon's secret gadget, the picture book sneakers", became the starting point, and the atmosphere of medieval Europe, which had not been set in the Doraemon films much up until now, was mixed in. However, there were few works based on medieval Europe, and the materials were limited, so the production of Doraemon movies carried out location scouting overseas, which is unusual for the production of Doraemon movies and interviewed various parts of Italy. It became the model for the setting of this work, the Principality of Arturia.

Yukiyo Teramoto also interviewed professors at Tokyo University of the Arts and incorporated as much art knowledge as possible into the work. He said, "Because the work is based on paintings, I made the paints and there are many descriptions related to the paintings, so I was very particular about those things and created them in great detail".

== Soundtrack ==
The theme song is titled "Sketch", written and performed by Aimyon. Aimyon is friends with Doraemon's current voice actress Wasabi Mizuta and came to the recording studio for a surprise visit.

== Reception ==
=== Box office ===
Doraemon: Nobita's Art World Tales ranked number one at the Japanese box office during its opening weekend. The film sold 571,000 tickets in its first three days, grossing 702,817,200 yen (approximately US$4.78 million). Doraemon Nobita's Art World Tales grossed a total of $39,145,439 and stayed at 1 at the Japanese box office for the first 6 weeks until Detective Conan: One-eyed Flashback was released.

== See also ==
- List of Doraemon films
