= Wasabi Mizuta =

Japanese actress (born 1974)

- 水田 わさび
- Born: August 4, 1974 (age 52); Aoyama, Mie, Japan
- Other name: Wasa-chan (わさちゃん)
- Occupations: Voice actress; stage actress; dubbing; narration
- Years active: 1993–present
- Agent: Aoni Production
- Known for: Doraemon as Doraemon
- Website: Official profile

Wasabi Mizuta (水田 わさび, Mizuta Wasabi; born August 4, 1974) is a Japanese voice actress and stage actress affiliated with Aoni Production. She was born in Aoyama, Mie.

She is most well known for being the current voice actress of the titular character of Doraemon since 2005, starting with the Doraemon television series.

Other notable voice acting roles of hers include Kintarō in Otogi Zoshi, Yūta Fukui in Hikaru no Go, Ash's Tepig in Pokémon, Buster in Hamtaro, and Monokuma in Danganronpa 2x2.

== Biography ==
=== Early life ===
Mizuta was born in Aoyama, Mie on August 4, 1974.

As a child, she grew up a fan of mainstream anime, being an especially huge fan of Ninja Hattori-kun and Obake no Q-Tarō during her elementary school years.

Her desire to enter the entertainment industry came about from when she used to read aloud at her elementary school. Many children were hesitant to volunteer, but Mizuta loved to show off by reading aloud in standard Japanese in her classroom, though it winded up happening so many times that the boys viewed her as an embarrassment. After discovering the joys of reading, she wanted to act using the natural extension of reading and aspired to become an actress.

Her dream to become a voice actress arose during her third year in junior high when the Dragon Ball television anime had become a popular series. She became a huge fan of the work, particularly admiring the performances of Masako Nozawa and Mayumi Tanaka, who voiced Goku and Krillin. When a friend of Mizuta's showed her a photograph of Nozawa, she was shocked to see that Goku was voiced by a woman, but quickly realized with the reveal how wonderful the profession of voice acting was and wanted to become a voice actress.

After graduating high school, she planned to move to Tokyo in order to pursue a voice acting career, but her parents were vehemently opposed to it. However her uncle who lived in Yokohama, Kanagawa Prefecture supported her. After promising her parents that she would give up if four years passed without accomplishment and graduating from Mie Prefectural Nabari Seihou High School, Mizuta moved to Tokyo.

=== Career ===
Mizuta saw a play by theater company Gekidan Sugoroku. Afterwards she was interviewed at the after-party's izakaya and was asked numerous questions. She passed the interview and joined the theater company, beginning her career as a stage actress.

Initially, she started off working as a support staff member behind the scenes, but made her acting debut portraying a courtesan as a substitute for an actor who ended up having to drop out of the role. At the time Mizuta had a fair complexion at the time, and thought, "Since this kid is here every day, they probably understand how the actors move." However, if it hadn't occurred, she likely would have stayed backstage for an indefinite period of time.

Since her debut was decided without much time until the actual performance was held, she entered the rehearsals feeling that she "just had to do it". Because she was portraying a courtesan, there were scenes where the partner of her scenes would place their hand down on the front of her dress. Likely because she was only around 20 years old at the time, she found it embarrassing and often thought to herself, "Ugh, I hate this..." Her anxieties disappeared once she got on-stage and she thought "This is so fun!! Acting out a single character is such an amazing feeling", acting so boldly that staff would warn out to her, "Hey, your chest is going to show!!"

She continued to perform as an actress while still getting backstage work done. It got to the point where she would even set up for other theater companies and get to watch their own plays for free. By around that time, Mizuta found acting to be fascinating and grow more immersed into it.

While performing in a stage play, voice actor and manager Kazuya Tatekabe happened to be in the show's audience and called out to her. Because she was performing as the horse in the play and had her face painted brown, he didn't recall her real name at first and referred to her as "horse", a nickname that even others would call her. One day, someone told her, "There's an audition for the role of a chubby boy—why don't you give it a try?", so she went in to audition, even despite being told that she would fail as she entered. Her lack of skill at the time ended up working in her favor and she passed the audition. In 1996, she made her voice acting debut as Daisuke Ueokayama in Hanako-san.

She was initially lost at first because she was not familiar with voice acting. Because she would "be in trouble" if she were too good, she would stay exactly how she was in skill, being handed the script and going to the recording studio without rehearsing. She'd often worry about making it safe to the recording studio and used to think that acting in front of a microphone was really difficult. She was taught how to perform by Kenichi Ogata and learned while being taught by senior voice actors despite not going to a training school.

Mizuta utilized her highly distinctive voice to appear in television anime like Hikaru no Go and Hamtaro.

When she was a newcomer, Mizuta juggled three jobs at once: a part-time job, stage actress, and voice actress. After the birth of her first child, she juggled four, now also parenting. She became more relaxed after becoming a mother and performs with ease.

She had been previously represented by Production Baobab and Kenji Utsumi's Ken Production.

=== Current activity ===
In 2010, Mizuta received the Kids/Family Award at the 4th Seiyu Awards.

In 2025, it was announced that Mizuta had assumed the role of Danganronpa series antagonist Monokuma for Danganronpa 2x2. She succeeded the role from Tarako, who originally succeeded in the role from Nobuyo Ōyama starting in 2016 and had died the previous year.

== Personal life ==
Her stage name "Wasabi" was given to her by Kenichi Ogata, the leader of theater company Gekidan Sugoroku at the time. It originated from the fact that wasabi grew wild in her parents' garden.

As a stage actress, she has worked for Gekidan Sugoroku and Engeki Butai Chatter Gang.

=== Features ===
Her voice range is mezzo-soprano, with her dialect being the Kansai dialect.

=== Hobbies and interests ===
Her personal hobbies are watching baseball and listening to Japanese rock, with her having special skill in singing.

She is a big fan of kimonos, often wearing one at events like press conferences. The reason why is because her grandmother had used to wear them until she died. After taking private kimono lessons, she wears a kimono once or twice a week.

Influenced by her father, she is a fan of the baseball team Hiroshima Toyo Carp.

=== Doraemon ===
In 2005, Mizuta replaced long-time voice actress Nobuyo Ōyama as the voice of Doraemon, starting with the Doraemon television series that began airing in April that year.

She was encouraged to audition for the role by Kazuya Tatekabe, her mentor and the voice of Gian in the Doraemon series from 1979 to 2005. When she was officially chosen to voice Doraemon, she was so overwhelmed that she burst into tears.

At the time, without even realizing that she had taken an audition, she was suddenly the only one called into the studio, where she was given a Doraemon script copy and simply told, "Could you read this for a bit?" Because she had previously appeared in the previous Doraemon series voicing minor roles, she casually approached the request while thinking, "Should I do this just in case something happens?" After having thought it was just a test, she later found out that it was her official audition for Doraemon, causing her to wish that she tried harder then, though despite being alone recording her lines, the solitary environment ultimately helped calm any nerves and allowed her to use her natural voice rather than impersonating Ōyama's voice.

Before she got the role, Mizuta had already been a TV Asahi voice actress, voicing Kawashima in Atashin'chi. One day while recording for Atashin'chi, she was asked to arrive 30 minutes early at the studio. When she arrived, she was suddenly asked, "Can you do the Doraemon voice for us one more time?", with the recording serving as her second audition for the Doraemon." She then advanced to the third and fourth rounds, where she even performed scene partner work. Sometime after, she was called in for her final audition, where I performed and was interviewed. While she was in the audition waiting room, other voice actors were called to another room one by one, leaving her alone, causing her to believe she had failed. In a surprise, the door then suddenly opened with a camera crew, who announced, "You're the one!!", with the footage being shown on the evening news.

The audition was also a result of her performing as a stage actress, with the director of Doraemon having requested her to audition, saying, "There was this eccentric girl in the Gekidan Sugoroku theater company, right? I want to hear her voice." The director noted to her that he did not expect her to stay, with Mizuta herself expressing surprise at the decision.

After being cast in the role of Doraemon, she didn't feel much pressure. She quickly realized the pressure of the role, reading all 45 volumes of the Doraemon manga and learning all about the franchise through reading many Doraemon-related books for interviews. She also had to re-dub Doraemon's voice for toys and commercials to reflect the switch in voice actor. She ended up being so busy that she ended up not having time to feel the pressure.

When she started voicing the role of Doraemon, she faced significant backlash, as viewers had grown to accept Ōyama's portrayal of Doraemon over the course of 26 years and longtime fans were left confused by the sudden change in voice. The reality of her position didn't sink in yet and during the stressful time period, her mindset was, "I might get fired from playing Doraemon. Let's just try to keep going for half a year. If I get fired after six months, I'll just accept that I wasn't cut out for it." Her husband, who is a huge Fujiko F. Fujio fan, told her, "You aren't up to the task. If you're going to quit, do it now". Those words made her realize just how massive a character in such a cherished work she had been chosen to voice. She and the other main Doraemon cast members Megumi Ōhara (Nobita), Yumi Kakazu (Shizuka), Tomokazu Seki (Suneo), and Subaru Kimura (Gian) shared the following sentiment: "Since it's a show that ran for 25 years, it's probably going to get a lot of backlash. I'd just be happy if we can keep it going for half a year." When it was decided to make Nobita's Dinosaur 2006, the first Doraemon feature film to feature her voicing Doraemon, Mizuta felt a great sense of relief, thinking, "They are going to let me continue as Doraemon," and "Yes!! I am truly getting to play Doraemon."

== Filmography ==
=== Television animation ===
List of voice performances in television animation
Year	Title	Role	Notes	Source
1993	Nintama Rantaro	Kameko Fukutomi		
1996	Midori no Makibaō	Naughty Kid		
1996	Wankorobee	Yokozuna-chan		
1997	Kindaichi Case Files	Black Beniko Kida 黒木田紅子		
1997	Fair, then Partly Piggy	Onigiriyama, others		
1998	Cyber Team in Akihabara	Billiken		
1998	Takoyaki Mantoman	Midori		
1998	Super Doll Licca-chan	Fukitani Tomonori		
1999	Arc the Lad	Poko A. Melville		
1999	Magic User's Club	Chika		
2000	Descendants of Darkness	倶生 god-brother 倶生神・弟		
2000	Shin Megami Tensei: DeviChil	Suzaku, Nisroch		
2001	Beyblade	Boris Kuznetsov		
2001	Crush Gear Turbo	Aida Chota 相田チョータ		
2001	Hikaru no Go	Yuta Fukui		
2002–05	Mirmo! series	Fire, Kepapa, Takosu		
2002–09	Atashin'chi	Kawashima		
2002	Fortune Dogs	Zenji ゼンジー		
2003	Beyblade G-Revolution	Boris Kuznetsov		
2003–06	Trotting Hamtaro	Buster	Debuted Ep. 140	
2003	Zatch Bell!	Majiro		
2003	Full-Blast Science Adventure – So That's How It Is	Badobado		
2004	Sgt. Frog	Children		
2004	Monster	Children		
2004	Duel Masters Charge	Ash アッシュ		
2004	Otogi Zoshi	Kintar.C5.8D		
2004	Onmyō Taisenki	Shinonome		
2005	Pretty Cure Max Heart	Kid		
2005–present	Doraemon	Doraemon		
2005–06	Fighting Beauty Wulong	Yagi Megumi	also Rebirth	
2005	Kotencotenco	Nekoumori		
2006	Buso Renkin	Angel Gozen		
2006–07	Shizuku-chan series	Hydrangea-san		
2006–07	Mega Man Star Force series	Chiyokichi Hasami, Cancer Bubble	Also Tribe in 2007	
2007	Moribito: Guardian of the Spirit	Kohyoi		
2008	Major	Katsuyoshi	4th TV series	
2008	Yes! PreCure 5 GoGo!	Mailpo		
2008	Kaiba	Hyo-Hyo, Babo		
2009	Tamagotchi!	Uwasatchi		
2010–11	Pokémon the Series: Black & White	Ash's Tepig		
2011–12	Pokémon: Black & White: Rival Destinies	Ash's Tepig/Pignite		
2015–16	Shin Atashinchi	Kawashima		
2015	Sailor Moon Crystal	Petz	Black Moon arc	
2017	One Piece	Amande		
2020	Auto Boy – Carl from Mobile Land	Dustin		
2026	Wash It All Away	Aji		

=== Film ===
List of voice performances in films
Year	Title	Role	Notes	Source
1996	Hanako-san	Daisuke Ueokayama	Debut voice acting role	
1999	Super Doll Licca-chan: Licca-chan Zettai Zetsumei! Doll Knights no Kiseki	Tomonori "Tomo" Michitani		
1999	Cyber Team in Akihabara: Summer Vacation of 2011	Billiken		
2006	Doraemon: Nobita's Dinosaur 2006	Doraemon		
2007	Doraemon: Nobita's New Great Adventure into the Underworld	Doraemon		
2008	Doraemon: Nobita and the Green Giant Legend	Doraemon		
2008	Yes PreCure 5 GoGo! The Movie: Happy Birthday in the Land of Sweets	Mailpo		
2009	Doraemon the Movie: Nobita's Spaceblazer	Doraemon		
2009	One Piece Film: Strong World	Xiao		
2010	Doraemon: Nobita's Great Battle of the Mermaid King	Doraemon		
2011	Doraemon: Nobita and the New Steel Troops—Winged Angels	Doraemon		
2011	Pokémon the Movie: Black—Victini and Reshiram and White—Victini and Zekrom	Tepig		
2012	Doraemon: Nobita and the Island of Miracles—Animal Adventure	Doraemon		
2012	Pokémon the Movie: Kyurem vs. the Sword of Justice	Pignite, Obaba		
2013	Doraemon: Nobita's Secret Gadget Museum	Doraemon		
2013	Pokémon the Movie: Genesect and the Legend Awakened	Pignite		
2014	Doraemon: New Nobita's Great Demon—Peko and the Exploration Party of Five	Doraemon		
2014	Stand by Me Doraemon	Doraemon		
2015	Doraemon: Nobita's Space Heroes	Doraemon		
2016	Doraemon: Nobita and the Birth of Japan 2016	Doraemon		
2017	Doraemon: Nobita's Great Adventure in the Antarctic Kachi Kochi	Doraemon		
2018	Doraemon: Nobita's Treasure Island	Doraemon		
2019	Doraemon: Nobita's Chronicle of the Moon Exploration	Doraemon		
2020	Doraemon: Nobita's New Dinosaur	Doraemon		
2020	Stand by Me Doraemon 2	Doraemon		
2022	Doraemon: Nobita's Little Star Wars 2021	Doraemon		
2023	Doraemon: Nobita's Sky Utopia	Doraemon		
2024	Doraemon: Nobita's Earth Symphony	Doraemon		
2025	Doraemon: Nobita's Art World Tales	Doraemon		
2026	Doraemon: New Nobita and the Castle of the Undersea Devil	Doraemon		
2027	Doraemon: Nobita's Steam-Powered Time Machine	Doraemon		

=== Video games ===
List of voice performances in video games
Year	Title	Role	Notes	Source
1999	Puyo Puyo~n	Panotti	DC	
2000	PoPoLoCRoIS Story II	Bokushi	PS1/PS2	
2001	Klonoa 2: Lunatea's Veil	Popka	PS1/PS2	
2002	Klonoa Beach Volleyball	Popka	PS1/PS2	
2002	Hikaru no Go-graduate student showdown at the summit -	Yuta Fukui	PS1/PS2	
2005	PoPoLoCRoIS	Bokushi	PSP	
2006	Doraemon: Nobita's Dinosaur 2006 DS	Doraemon	DS	
2006	Fighting Beauty Wulong	Megumi Yagi	PS1/PS2	
2007	Doraemon: Nobita no Shin Makai Daibouken DS	Doraemon	DS	
2007	Buso Renkin: Welcome Papillon to Park	Angel Gozen	PS1/PS2	
2007	Doraemon Wii – Secret Tool King Tournament	Doraemon	Wii	
2007	Everybody's Golf Portable 2	Jack	PSP	
2008	Doraemon: Nobita and the Green Giant Legend DS	Doraemon	DS	
2014	Granblue Fantasy	Funf	Mobile Game	
2021	Granblue Fantasy	Doraemon	Mobile Game	
2022	Puyopuyo!! Quest	Doraemon	Mobile Game	
2022	Klonoa Phantasy Reverie Series	Popka	Multi-platform	
2027	Danganronpa 2×2	Monokuma	Multi-platform	

=== Dubbing ===
==== Feature films ====
List of voice performances in feature films
Year	Title	Role	Notes	Source
2019	Sin	Kassie (Kerry Washington)		

==== Animation ====
List of voice performances in animation dubbing
Year	Title	Role	Notes	Source
1999	The Magic School Bus	Timothy "Tim" Wright (Max Beckford and Andre Ottley-Lorant)		
2005	Invader Zim	GIR (Rosearik Rikki Simons)		
2008	Angelina Ballerina	Alice Nimbletoes (Jo Wyatt)		
2009	Moomin and Midsummer Madness	Little My (Sonja Ball)		
2010	Petit Vampire	Michel Douffon (Kevin Sommier)		
2016	Doraemon: Gadget Cat from the Future	Doraemon (Mona Marshall)		
2019	Invader Zim: Enter the Florpus	GIR (Rosearik Rikki Simons)		
2020	The Boss Baby: Back in Business	Frankie (Aparna Nancherla)		
2023	Paw Patrol: The Mighty Movie	Kitty (Chris Rock)		

==== Radio ====
List of voice performances in radio dubbing
Year	Title	Role	Notes	Source
2013	Dignity of father 父の威厳	Ayaka Narita		
2013	You alone like travel diary おひとり様の旅日記	Yumeko		

=== Live-action ===
List of voice performances in live-action films
Year	Title	Role	Notes	Source
2019	As the Gods Will	Daikyokushō Matryoshka		

Preceded by Nobuyo Ōyama	Voice of Doraemon; 2005–present	Succeeded by incumbent

Preceded by Tarako	Voice of Monokuma; 2025–present	Succeeded by incumbent
