= Doraemon: Nobita's Secret Gadget Museum =

2013 film by Yukiyo Teramoto

- Theatrical release poster

Japanese name
- Kanji: 映画ドラえもん のび太のひみつ道具博物館(ミュージアム)
- Literal meaning: Doraemon the Movie: Nobita's Secret Gadget Museum
Transcriptions
- Revised Hepburn: Eiga Doraemon: Nobita no Himitsu Dōgu Museum
- Directed by: Yukiyo Teramoto
- Screenplay by: Higashi Shimizu
- Based on: Doraemon by Fujiko F. Fujio
- Starring: Wasabi Mizuta; Megumi Ōhara; Yumi Kakazu; Subaru Kimura; Tomokazu Seki; Chiaki; Ken Matsudaira; Osamu Mukai; Yūko Sanpei; Takaya Hashi; Shigeru Chiba; Yui Horie; Rikako Aikawa
- Music by: Kan Sawada
- Production company: Shin-Ei Animation
- Distributed by: Toho
- Release date: March 9, 2013
- Running time: 104 minutes
- Country: Japan
- Language: Japanese
- Box office: US$42.7 million

Doraemon: Nobita's Secret Gadget Museum (Japanese: 映画ドラえもん のび太のひみつ道具博物館(ミュージアム), Hepburn: Eiga Doraemon: Nobita no Himitsu Dōgu Museum) is a 2013 Japanese anime mystery adventure film and the 33rd installment of the Doraemon film series. Directed by Yukiyo Teramoto and written by Higashi Shimizu, the film follows Doraemon as he travels with Nobita, Shizuka, Gian, and Suneo to the Secret Gadget Museum in the future to retrieve his stolen bell. Shimizu supplied the premise, which Teramoto expanded to emphasize friendship. To portray the bond between Doraemon and Nobita, the script incorporates various homages to Sherlock Holmes.

Shin-Ei Animation produced the animation, Kan Sawada composed the score, and Perfume performed the theme song, "Mirai no Museum". Distributed by Toho, it was released in Japan on March 9, 2013, and grossed ¥3.98 billion. It also grossed US$42.7 million worldwide. Adaptations include a manga, an anime comic, and a novelization, all published by Shogakukan, as well as a Nintendo 3DS video game by FuRyu. Critics praised it for its gadget museum theme and its emotional depiction of the friendship between Doraemon and Nobita. It won the Silver Prize at the 31st Golden Gross Awards, presented by the Japan Association of Theatre Owners.

== Plot ==
Doraemon is sleeping in his closet when a robotic hand emerges, reaches for his bell, and steals it. In a panic, he consults Nobita, who points out that the bell is broken and asks why it matters. Without revealing the truth, Doraemon claims it is valuable to him and recalls a time when he asked the factory where he was made if they could repair the bell. A factory technician explained that the bell was an obsolete model and too expensive to fix, but Doraemon insisted on keeping it. He pulls out the Sherlock Holmes Set (シャーロック·ホームズセット) and gives it to Nobita, who uses it to discover the name of the culprit: Kaitō DX, a well-known gadget thief in the 22nd century.

After discussing the incident with Dorami, Doraemon, Nobita, Shizuka, Gian, and Suneo travel to the 22nd century to visit the Secret Gadget Museum, where they meet Director Fiks and Kurt, a young museum guide who gives them a tour. Doraemon and Nobita search for the lost bell and meet Inspector Mustard, who is investigating Kaitō DX's connection to the museum. Gian and Suneo unknowingly pass through the Gulliver Tunnel (ガリバートンネル), which shrinks them. Nobita, Doraemon, and Shizuka get lost in a tunnel leading to the Sun-Manufacturing Machine, which powers the museum. Professor Peppler's negligence caused a freak accident that made the artificial sun gradually expand into a giant star and endanger the world, leading to his dismissal. During that incident, his colleague Hartman discovered Fullmetal, which enabled him to stabilize the sun's core and manufacture secret gadgets.

Doraemon begins acting increasingly like a feral cat. The group spends the night at Kurt's home, where they meet his gelatinous robot pet, Popon. The next day, the museum receives a threat from Kaitō DX, who vows to steal four gadgets at noon. Kaitō DX defeats the group and steals the listed items. Using the Holmes gadget, Nobita discovers that the targeted security gadgets were all repaired on the day Peppler was dismissed. The group's search for him leads to a secret passage. When Kaitō DX intercepts them, Nobita discovers his identity as Kurt. Kurt explains the invention he and Peppler were trying to complete. Converting Fullmetal into "Peppler-Metal" requires six chips that Peppler stashed inside various gadgets, including Doraemon's bell. To retrieve these items, they created the persona of Kaitō DX.

Still shrunken, Gian and Suneo retrieve the Big Light (ビッグライト) and restore themselves to normal size. Peppler recovers the chips and begins the conversion. This causes all Fullmetal gadgets to disappear and destabilizes the artificial sun, releasing a monstrous protector that attacks the group. After transforming into Kaitō Dora DX by putting on Kaitō DX's bow tie, Doraemon defeats the monster but accidentally destroys the mainframe controlling the sun. To make the sun disappear, Nobita orders Popon to swallow it. As the museum collapses around them, Peppler reverses the conversion to restore the gadgets, allowing Doraemon to use the Restoring Beam (復元光線) to repair the building and save the team. Kurt helps search for the bell and returns half of it to Doraemon. Nobita finds the other half, realizes that Doraemon cherishes it because it holds the memory of when their friendship began, and brings it to him.

== Voice cast ==
Voice cast is adapted from the Toho website.

- Wasabi Mizuta as Doraemon
- Megumi Ōhara as Nobita Nobi
- Yumi Kakazu as Shizuka Minamoto
- Subaru Kimura as Takeshi "Gian" Gōda
- Tomokazu Seki as Suneo Honekawa
- Chiaki as Dorami
- Ken Matsudaira as Inspector Mustard
- Yūko Sanpei as Kurt
- Takaya Hashi as Director Fiks
- Shigeru Chiba as Professor Peppler
- Yui Horie as Ginger
- Rikako Aikawa as Popon

== Production ==
=== Development and writing ===
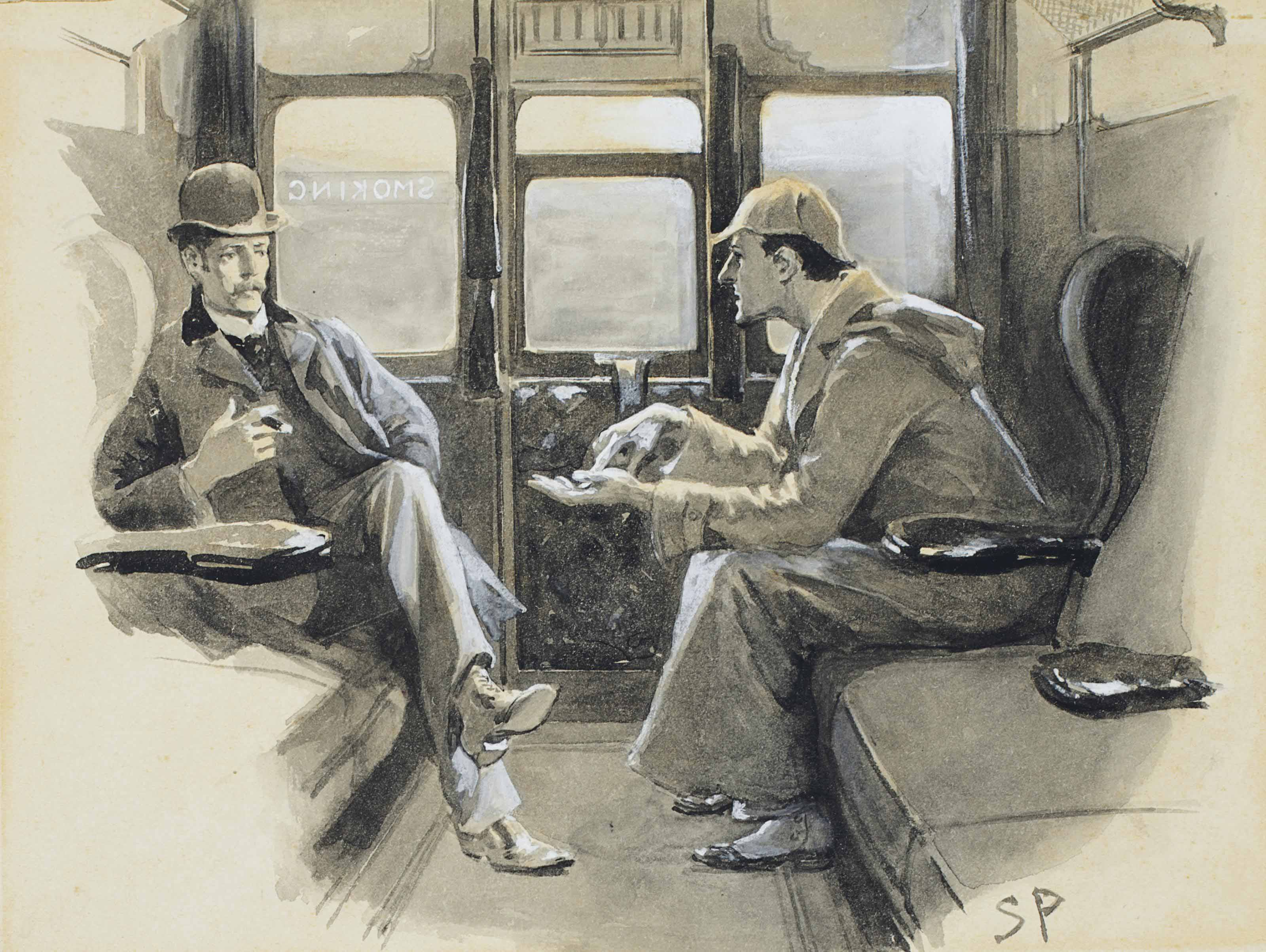
Director Yukiyo Teramoto was inspired by the relationship between Dr. Watson (left) and Sherlock Holmes (right) and adapted it for Doraemon and Nobita.

Yukiyo Teramoto had storyboarded and directed several episodes of the Doraemon series after its premiere on TV Asahi in 2005. The 33rd installment, Nobita's Secret Gadget Museum, was her third Doraemon film as director, following New Great Adventure into the Underworld (2007) and New Steel Troops—Winged Angels (2011), both remakes. Structured as a mystery adventure written by Higashi Shimizu, the screenplay focuses primarily on Doraemon and is grounded in his relationship with Nobita. Shimizu provided the core plot point of searching for Doraemon's bell, which Teramoto expanded to emphasize their friendship.

Because her 2011 film was a serious drama, Teramoto and the production staff wanted to make a more lighthearted follow-up. Although the script initially leaned toward a serious tone during reviews, the story shifted toward comedy in line with Teramoto's preference, as her goal was to leave the audience laughing. Since her previous two films were remakes, this was her first time tackling an original storyline. Developing an original concept required more effort, although she found the process of independently conceiving the setting and details engaging. To keep the story upbeat, all the characters were given cheerful personalities.

The Secret Gadget Museum setting originated from a proposal co-created by Fujiko Pro and Shintaro Mugiwara, who wrote and illustrated Dorabase, a baseball-themed manga spin-off of Doraemon. To develop the premise, Teramoto thoroughly read the original manga to capture Fujiko F. Fujio's world. She frequently consulted the Latest Secret Gadget Encyclopedia (最新ひみつ道具大事典), a Doraemon manga guide published by Shogakukan. She felt a strong attachment to the gadgets she had featured in the television series, including the Milky Way Railroad (天の川鉄道), the Wrestling Killer (ころばし屋), and the Woodcutter's Spring (きこりの泉).

A fan of the original Sherlock Holmes stories, Teramoto believed they remained popular because of their depiction of the friendship between Holmes and Dr. Watson. As the stories combined mystery with partnership, she embedded several references to them and adapted the Holmes–Watson dynamic for Doraemon and Nobita. When brainstorming dialogue to express Nobita's positive traits, Teramoto settled on the phrase "good guy" (いいヤツ); she felt its distinctly boyish quality naturally conveyed the characters' close relationship and mirrored the language Nobita uses in the original manga.

=== Pre-production ===
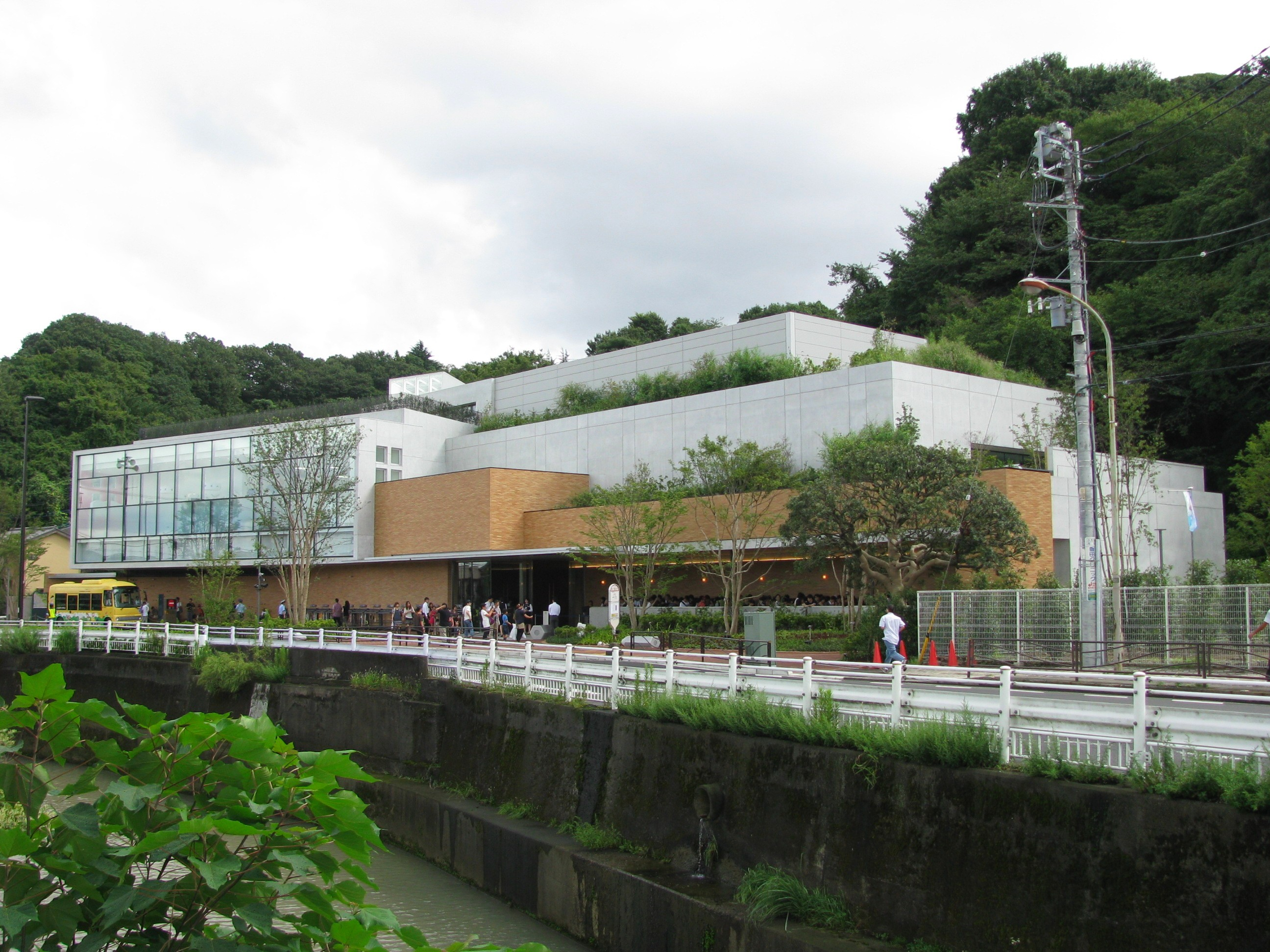
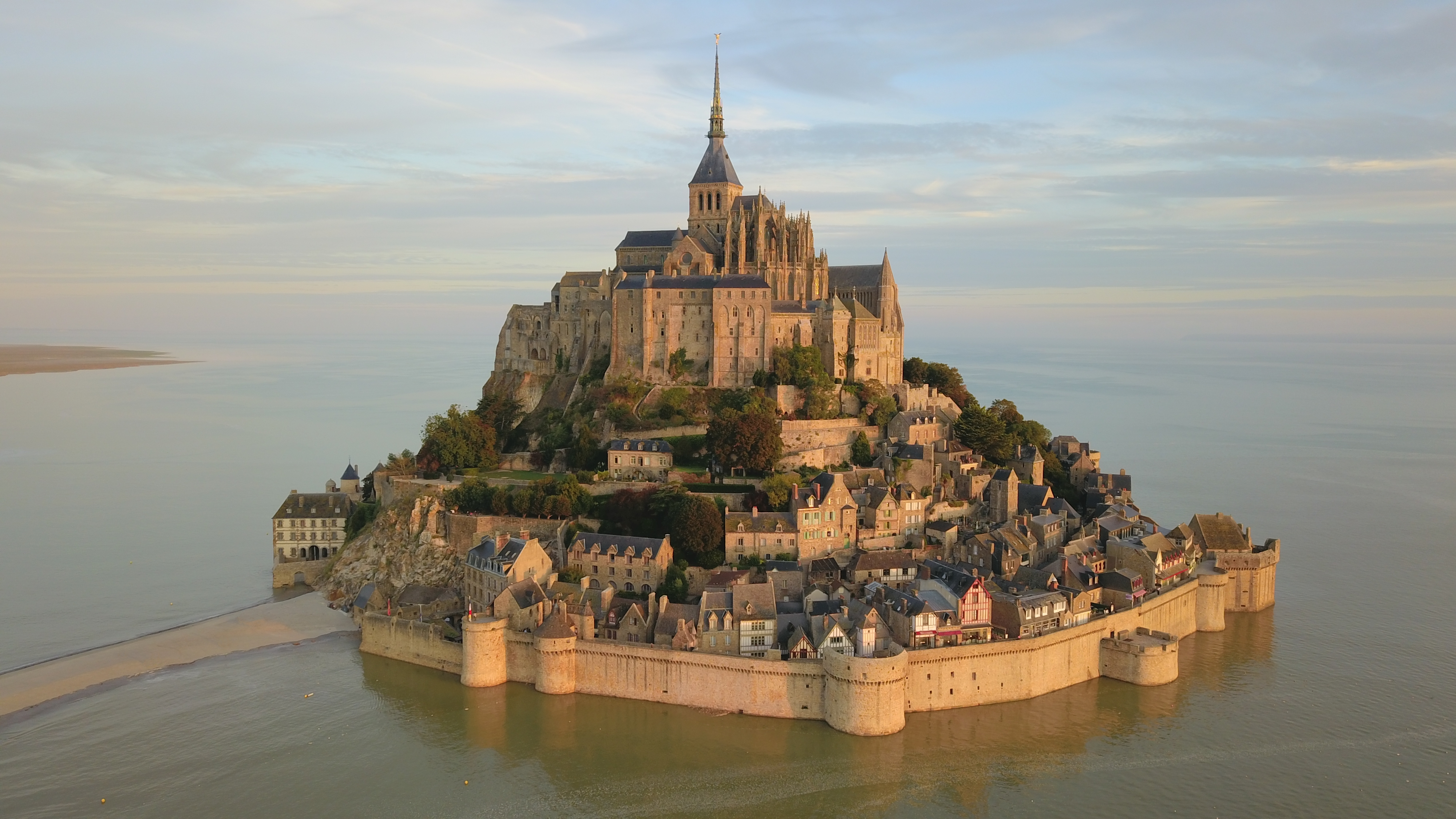
The Secret Gadget Museum concept was inspired by a visit to the Fujiko F. Fujio Museum (top) in September 2011 and by Mont-Saint-Michel in France (bottom).

The film was produced by a committee consisting of Fujiko Pro, Shogakukan, TV Asahi, Shin-Ei Animation, Asatsu-DK (ADK), and Shogakukan-Shueisha Productions (ShoPro); Shin-Ei handled the animation. Minoru Yamaoka was hired as assistant director, Koichi Maruyama as character designer, Makoto Dobashi as art director, and Akiyoshi Tanaka as recording director. The regular voice cast included Wasabi Mizuta (Doraemon), Megumi Ōhara (Nobita), Yumi Kakazu (Shizuka), Subaru Kimura (Gian), Tomokazu Seki (Suneo), and Chiaki (Dorami). Ken Matsudaira joined the voice cast as Inspector Mustard. Teramoto had previously attended a live stage performance starring Matsudaira. She was impressed by his voice acting after he was cast, remarking that it matched Mustard's image perfectly. Other supporting voice actors included Yūko Sanpei (Kurt), Takaya Hashi (Director Fiks), Shigeru Chiba (Professor Peppler), Yui Horie (Ginger), and Rikako Aikawa (Popon).

The museum setting was conceived partly to commemorate the opening of the Fujiko F. Fujio Museum in September 2011. Teramoto and Dobashi expanded the concepts and visuals for the Secret Gadget Museum, designing it for both adults and children to enjoy. They incorporated elements from a visit to that museum, where Teramoto had observed interesting signs and gimmicks. The Secret Gadget Museum was designed with a palace-like exterior and an interior that could be expanded infinitely using a gadget called the Dimension Roller (次元ローラー). Instead of traditional doors, the exhibition rooms were connected in various layouts. To display a large number of secret gadgets, the Robot Hall was chosen as the first exhibition room Nobita and his friends entered. The museum's island setting was inspired by a note in Fujiko Pro's initial planning document referencing Mont-Saint-Michel in France.

Teramoto drew characters while considering their backstories and emotional states, focusing on the nuances of their personal lives. One backstory element was that Professor Peppler switched to drinking black tea after a failure involving coffee, though several such details could not be depicted. Numerous Sherlock Holmes parodies were also integrated. The art pieces The Dancing Dog of Bohemia (ボヘミアの踊る犬) and The Devil's Foot Sole Massage (悪魔の足ツボマッサージ), which appear at the beginning of the film, reference four Holmes stories: "A Scandal in Bohemia" (1891), "The Adventure of the Dancing Men" (1903), The Hound of the Baskervilles (1902), and "The Adventure of the Devil's Foot" (1910). Machine components placed inside a butter dish in Professor Peppler's laboratory were inspired by "The Adventure of the Musgrave Ritual" (1893), and his installation of microchips into six gadgets was drawn from "The Adventure of the Six Napoleons" (1904).

=== Animation ===
Despite the challenge of depicting the cluttered Anything Hall, where objects were piled to the ceiling, Teramoto believed the animation and background staff successfully brought out a futuristic feel. She found comedy difficult, observing that while movies that evoke tears rely on fixed patterns, laughter is unpredictable, so intended comedic scenes can miss the mark, whereas unexpected ones draw laughs. Teramoto preferred humor that prompted a quiet smirk rather than broad gags, such as having replacement items for Doraemon's bell change without anyone noticing. The action sequences, such as the battle between Kaitō DX and Inspector Mustard, depicted two opposing gadgets clashing like a spear and a shield.

Along with mystery and detective themes new to the franchise, the animation provides emotional depth; the scene where Nobita cleans a ditch was drawn to convey his bond with Doraemon and illustrate why Doraemon treasures his bell. Another scene set in the Matsushiba Repair Service Center, where a character tells Doraemon, "It's cheaper to buy a new one" (買い直したほうが安いよ), was based on Teramoto's personal experience. In her youth, her father had attached an Anglepoise lamp to her desk; when it broke and a shopkeeper suggested a replacement, she refused for sentimental reasons and instead sent it to the manufacturer for repair.

Dialogue also includes homages to Sherlock Holmes: Doraemon references actor William Gillette's catchphrase, "Elementary, my dear Watson", while Nobita mutters "baritsu" (バリツ), a fictional martial art associated with Holmes, when chasing the Wrestling Killer in the Anything Hall. Throughout production, Teramoto prioritized the gentle tone characteristic of Fujiko F. Fujio's work—which she viewed as a reflection of his personality—and ensured that even an angry character's facial expressions were balanced to avoid appearing overly harsh.

=== Music ===
Kan Sawada produced the soundtrack, which was released by Nippon Columbia on June 24, 2015, as part of the two-disc compilation album Doraemon: Nobita's Space Heroes Original Soundtrack & More ~ Doraemon Soundtrack History 3 Music by Kan Sawada ~ (映画ドラえもん のび太の宇宙英雄記(スペースヒーローズ) オリジナル・サウンドトラック&モア 〜映画ドラえもんサウンドトラックヒストリー3 Music by 沢田完〜), covering music from the 2011–2015 Doraemon films. The Secret Gadget Museum soundtrack occupies tracks 49–60 of disc one and tracks 1–9 of disc two. "Yume wo Kanaete Doraemon", performed by mao, was the opening theme, and Chiaki's "Egao wa Himitsu Dōgu" was an insert song. On November 24, 2012, during the final performance of Perfume's first overseas tour, Perfume World Tour 1st, the group announced that their new song, "Mirai no Museum", would be the film's theme song. Described as a pop tune with a transparent melody expressing the worldview of the story, the song was released as a single on February 27, 2013, by Universal Music Japan.

== Release ==
=== Marketing ===
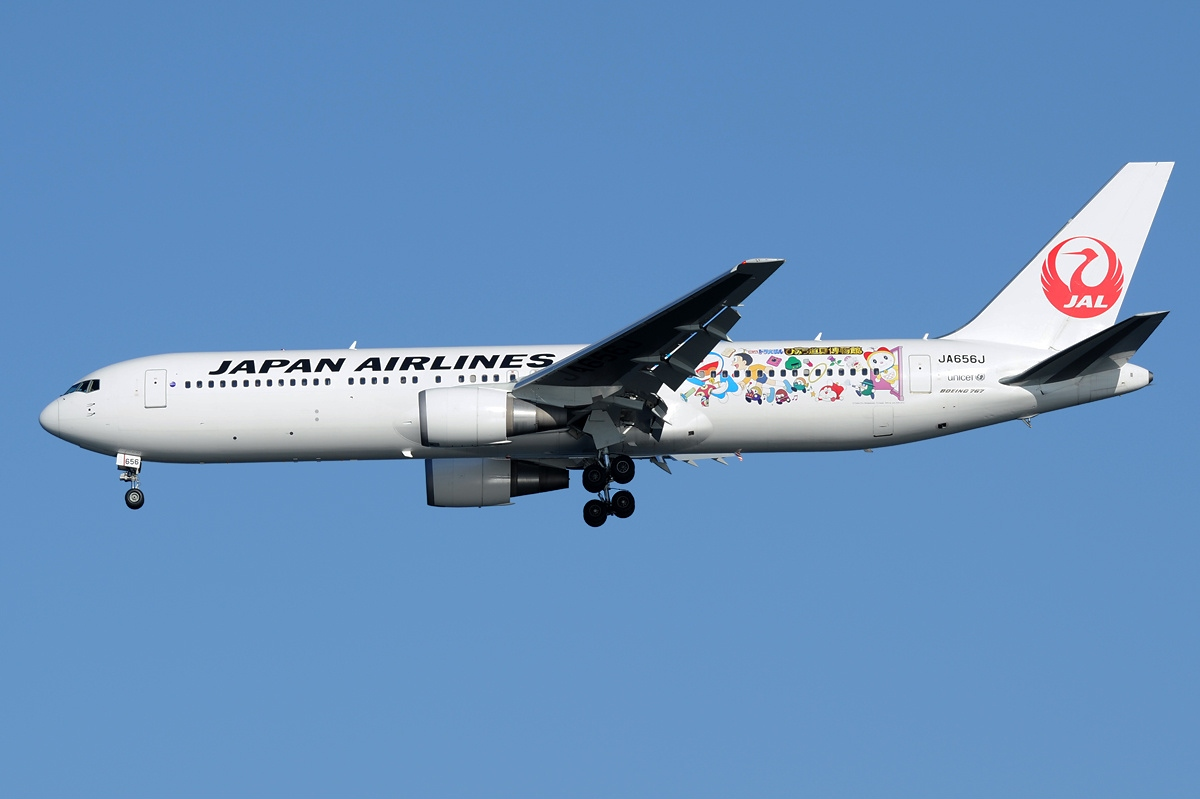
A Japan Airlines Doraemon Jet in January 2013

The trailer was released on November 30, 2012, at 7:00 pm (JST) on TV Asahi during the Doraemon anime broadcast and then on the film's official website. "Mirai no Museum" was broadcast weekly as the ending theme of Doraemon beginning on January 11, 2013, alongside comments from Perfume. A special episode titled "Strongest! Wrestling Killer Z" (最強！ころばし屋Z), which featured the Secret Gadget Museum, the main setting of the film, aired on March 1, 2013.

Former professional tennis player and TV personality Shuzo Matsuoka led a cheering squad, joined by Fuku Suzuki and his younger sister Yume. From February 1, 2013, the squad appeared during Doraemon series broadcasts to promote the film. A Doraemon support group called Dora-Ana Dan (ドラアナ団), composed of announcers from five TV Asahi network stations, was formed to build anticipation on their respective programs alongside the squad. On February 15, 2013, TV Asahi Douga introduced a monthly unlimited-viewing package for Doraemon to mark the film's release, the platform's first monthly flat-rate service.

Between December 12, 2012, and March 24, 2013, Japan Airlines operated a custom-themed Doraemon Jet (ドラえもん ジェット) on domestic routes across Japan to promote the release. The Chez Madu cafe, located in the first-floor atrium of the TV Asahi Headquarters in Roppongi, Tokyo, was transformed into the Doraemon Secret Gadget Cafe from February 1 to April 14, 2013, with an entrance designed like the Anywhere Door (どこでもドア) and replicas of secret gadgets exhibited throughout the venue. A preview screening was held on February 24, 2013, at Tokyo Dome City Hall in Koraku, Tokyo, followed by an opening-day stage greeting at Toho Cinemas Nichigeki in Yurakucho on March 9.

=== Box office ===
Distributed by Toho, the film was released in Japan on March 9, 2013, and topped the box office for its first two weeks. Before its release, advance sales exceeded 250,000 tickets. Within 16 days of opening, it drew more than 1.8 million moviegoers and grossed ¥2 billion (US$20.5 million). On March 22, 2013, the film helped the Doraemon franchise surpass 100 million cumulative admissions, setting a record for a Japanese film series and outpacing the 28-film Godzilla series, which had 99 million. Its gross of ¥3.98 billion (US$40.8 million) made it Japan's sixth-highest-grossing film of the year. Internationally, it debuted on July 25, 2013, in South Korea, where it grossed ₩781.5 million (US$713,790), and in Hong Kong, where it grossed US$542,068. Releases followed in Taiwan on August 2, Thailand on October 17 (US$377,659), and Spain on October 31 (US$1,249,437). On December 27, 2013, it became the first Doraemon film released theatrically in Vietnam. According to Box Office Mojo, the film grossed US$42.7 million worldwide.

=== Other media ===
On August 9, 2013, Shogakukan released Secret Gadget Museum on DVD and Blu-ray for rental, distributed by Toho. A retail home media version was released on December 4 by Pony Canyon, with the Blu-ray available in standard and special editions. The special edition includes bonus videos and a booklet containing an exclusive short story illustrated by Teramoto. The film was broadcast on March 7, 2014, on TV Asahi, as part of a three-hour anime festival special featuring Doraemon and Crayon Shin-chan. On March 8, 2015, the film was made available on au's Video Pass streaming service alongside the franchise's other 34 films to commemorate the series' 35th anniversary. A Nintendo 3DS video game adaptation by FuRyu, featuring five mini-games and more than 190 collectible secret gadgets, was released on March 7, 2013. Shogakukan published several print adaptations: a manga illustrated by Mugiwara on March 30, 2013, an anime comic on July 26, 2013, and a novelization written by Naohiro Fukushima and Azuma Shimizu on October 25, 2024.

== Reception ==
According to Anime! Anime!, Secret Gadget Museum received acclaim for its gadgets, museum setting, mystery-solving elements, and the emotional bond between Doraemon and Nobita. The publication ranked it as its favorite Doraemon film in 2023. In 2024, Eiga.com chose it as one of its 20 recommended Doraemon films. It won the Silver Prize at the 31st Golden Gross Awards, presented by the Japan Association of Theatre Owners.

Takahiro Ozawa of Excite News praised the film for breaking from formulaic conventions through innovative storytelling, impressive physical action, and thoughtful sci-fi lore expansion, writing that it was "deeply touching" to longtime fans. Misaki Koyama of Wowow called it "a must-see for mystery lovers" and praised its Sherlock Holmes–inspired elements and direction. Another reviewer from Anime! Anime! wrote that the film successfully tackled an original story, attributing this to a focus on long-familiar gadgets that heightened children's excitement. Kasa Kiki of Aniru! described the film as a return to form for the franchise, commending its animation, futuristic setting, and blend of comedy with social themes.

South Korean critic Lee Ji-hyun of Cine21 described the film as a heartwarming and educational experience for all ages, citing its charmingly "cat-like" main character, well-motivated antagonists, and touching emotional scenes. A reviewer for Tencent Entertainment wrote that despite a modest box office run in Hong Kong and simpler animation, the film resonated strongly with viewers. In Vietnam, Thịnh Joey of VietnamPlus commended the film's universal appeal and wholesome family themes. Hoàng Lâm of Doanh Nhân Sài Gòn praised Teramoto's direction, citing its engaging storyline, entertaining adventures for children, and thematic emphasis on friendship and courage.
