= Doraemon: Nobita's Great Adventure in the Antarctic Kachi Kochi =

2017 film by Atsushi Takahashi

- Theatrical release poster

Japanese name
- Kanji: 映画ドラえもん のび太の南極カチコチ大冒険
- Literal meaning: Doraemon: Nobita's Great Adventure in the Antarctic Kachi Kochi
Transcriptions
- Revised Hepburn: Eiga Doraemon Nobita no Nankyoku Kachikochi Dai Bōken
- Directed by: Atsushi Takahashi
- Screenplay by: Atsushi Takahashi
- Based on: Doraemon by Fujiko F. Fujio
- Starring: Wasabi Mizuta; Megumi Ōhara; Yumi Kakazu; Tomokazu Seki; Subaru Kimura; Chiaki; Rie Kugimiya; Aya Endo; Nao Toyama
- Music by: Kan Sawada
- Production company: Shin-Ei Animation
- Distributed by: Toho
- Release date: March 4, 2017
- Running time: 101 minutes
- Country: Japan
- Language: Japanese
- Budget: $8 million
- Box office: $61.4 million

Doraemon: Nobita's Great Adventure in the Antarctic Kachi Kochi (Note: Doraemon: Nobita's Great Adventure in the Antarctic Kachi Kochi (映画ドラえもん のび太の南極カチコチ大冒険, Eiga Doraemon Nobita no Nankyoku Kachikochi Dai Bōken)) is a Japanese animated science fiction film. It is the 37th installment in the Doraemon film series. It is directed and written by Atsushi Takahashi.

== Plot ==
The film starts with 100,000 years ago, Carla losing her gold ring. On the other hand, unable to endure the mid-summer heat, Doraemon transports Nobita and his friends to a huge iceberg floating in the Southern Ocean. While creating an amusement park with the secret gadget "Ice-Working Iron", Nobita finds a mysterious golden ring in the ice and he asks Doraemon to search how old the golden ring was. After learning that the ring was buried in Antarctica 100,000 years ago, Doraemon tells Nobita and his friends that nobody had discovered Antarctica until 1773, Doraemon and his friends change their clothes to winter clothes and use Anywhere Door to visit Antarctica in search of its owner. They melt a blue elephant like structure whom Nobita calls Mosuke who was frozen in the ice with a bag. After facing many threats they come across the ruins of a huge city buried in the ice, and then travel back in time to meet Carla and Professor Hyakkoi, who are connected to the mysterious ring and finally meet them and Carla's yellow elephant Yuka-tan similar to Mosuke; however, the group must fight for survival as Doraemon risks plunging the Earth into another ice age. When everything starts freezing, Nobita, Shizuka, Suneo, Gian, Carla, Mosuke, Doraemon and Yuka-tan decide to travel 100,000 years later to survive but Doraemon and Yuka-tan are separated from the group while they reach in future. But they are unable to go back in time since the time belt battery is empty. Back in time, Doraemon remembers Dorami's prediction that his lucky star can save him from getting frozen and freezes Yuka-tan with the bag of gadgets and the battery. Mosuke gives the bag to Nobita which was frozen with it and Nobita says Mosuke is none other than Yuka-tan frozen by Doraemon to send them the battery. Everyone travel back in time and save Doraemon and fight the ice giant. The film ends with showing Doraemon and his friends saying farewell to their friend Carla and Professor as they prepare to leave Earth, after this Doraemon and his friends return to the home, Doraemon shows Nobita the planet's (where Carla and Professor lived or home planet of Carla and Professor) ice is melting and after some time the planet returns to it normal condition and in the last sentence of the film before credits, Nobita's Mom calls him and Doraemon for dinner. The planet's position was given to Doraemon by professor. Doraemon uses a telescope to view the planet and the end .

== Cast ==
Character	Japanese voice actor
Doraemon	Wasabi Mizuta
Nobita	Megumi Ōhara
Shizuka Minamoto	Yumi Kakazu
Suneo Honekawa	Tomokazu Seki
Takeshi "Gian" Gōda	Subaru Kimura
Dorami	Chiaki
Tamako Nobi	Kotono Mitsuishi
Nobisuke Nobi	Yasunori Matsumoto
Professor Hyakkoi	Daisuke Namikawa
Carla	Rie Kugimiya
Octogon	Masumi Yagi
Yamitem	Shigeo Takahashi
Mofusuke	Aya Endo
Yuka-tan	Nao Toyama
Brisaga	Ayaka Hirahara
Pao Pao	Mai Asada, Nobunari Oda

== Theme song ==
- Boku no kokoro wo tsukutte yo, Make My Heart (僕の心をつくってよ, Make My Heart) by Ken Hirai.

== Release ==
The film was released in Japan on 4 March 2017. This movie released in India on August 14, 2022 on Hungama TV.

== Box office ==
Debuting on 371 screens with Toho distributing, Doraemon the Movie 2017: Great Adventure in the Antarctic Kachi Kochi earned $6.1 million on 592,036 admissions in its first weekend and ranked 1 on Japanese box office. Doraemon's 37th film made highest second weekend gross and highest total after second weekend in the franchise and is the fastest Doraemon's film to reach ¥4 billion milestone within 37 days of release.

Here is a table which shows the box office of this movie of all the weekends in Japan:

#	Rank	Weekend	Weekend gross	Total gross till current weekend
1	1	March 4–5	¥691,813,500 ($6.1 million)	¥691,813,500 ($6.1 million)
2	2	March 11–12	¥507,416,050 ($4.4 million)	¥1,335,367,550 ($11.6 million)
3	3	March 18–19	¥381,033,500 ($3.4 million)	¥1,883,054,900 ($16.8 million)
4	4	March 25–26	¥304,031,100 ($2.7 million)	¥2,646,925,600 ($23.8 million)
5	4	April 8–2	¥278,872,700 ($2.5 million)	¥3,537,579,600 ($31.7 million)
6	5	April 8–9	¥166,112,900 ($1.5 million)	¥4,038,973,500 ($36.3 million)
7	6	April 15–16	¥71,000,000 ($655,000)	¥4,140,000,000 ($37.3 million)
8	10	April 22–23	¥39,704,100 ($361,000)	¥4,197,254,100 ($37.8 million)
9	-	April 29–30	¥31,000,000 ($273,000)	¥4,240,000,000 ($38.1 million)
10	-	May 6–07	¥32,000,000 ($282,000)	¥4,340,000,000 ($38.9 million)
11	-	May 13–14	¥9,000,000 ($80,800)	¥4,360,000,000 ($39.1 million)
FINAL TOTAL	-	-	-	¥4,430,000,000 ($39.49 million)

The film was released in China on May 30, 2017, and grossed CN¥149 million ($22.05 million) after completing its theatrical run.

It was released in Hong Kong on August 3, 2017, and grossed HK$8.2 million (US$1.1 million).

In South Korea, it was released on August 11, 2017, and grossed $1,042,480 after completing its theatrical run. The film also grossed $74,855 in Turkey. In total, the film grossed over $61.4 million worldwide.

== Other media ==
A video game based on the film for the Nintendo 3DS was released in Japan on March 2, 2017.

== See also ==
- List of Doraemon films
