= Doraemon: Nobita's Steam-Powered Time Machine =

2027 film by Tetsuo Yajima

Doraemon the Movie: Nobita's Steam-Powered Time Machine
- Teaser poster

Japanese name
- Kanji: 映画ドラえもん のび太の蒸気時間車
Transcriptions
- Revised Hepburn: Eiga Doraemon Nobita no Joukijikansha
- Directed by: Rushio Moriyama
- Screenplay by: Makoto Ueda
- Starring: Wasabi Mizuta; Megumi Ohara; Yumi Kakazu; Subaru Kimura; Tomokazu Seki
- Music by: Takayuki Hattori
- Production company: Shin-Ei Animation
- Distributed by: Toho Co., Ltd.
- Release date: March 5, 2027
- Country: Japan
- Language: Japanese

Doraemon: Nobita's Steam-Powered Time Machine (Japanese: 映画ドラえもん のび太の蒸気時間車, Hepburn: Eiga Doraemon Nobita no Joukijikansha) is an upcoming Japanese animated fantasy science fiction adventure film. It is the 46th Doraemon feature film. It is directed by Rushio Moriyama from a screenplay by Makoto Ueda. It is set to release in Japan on 5 March 2027.

== Cast ==
| Character | Cast |
|---|---|
| Doraemon | Wasabi Mizuta |
| Nobita Nobi | Megumi Ōhara |
| Shizuka Minamoto | Yumi Kakazu |
| Takeshi "Gian" Gōda | Subaru Kimura |
| Suneo Honekawa | Tomokazu Seki |
| Welson | Chikahiro Kobayashi |
| Tim | Tomoyo Kurosawa |
| Lily | Aoi Yūki |
| Doug | Kenshō Ono |
| Nick | Riko Fujitani |

== See also ==
- List of Doraemon films
