= Chantana Tharajan =

Thai voice actress

- ฉันทนา ธาราจันทร์
- Born: 11 February 1946 (age 80); Thailand
- Occupation: Voice actress
- Years active: 1972–present
- Known for: Thai voice of Doraemon

Chantana Tharajan (Thai: ฉันทนา ธาราจันทร์) is a Thai voice actress and former actress. Chantana is best known for the roles of Doraemon in Doraemon 1979 and 2005 series. She has also voiced Naruto Uzumaki in Naruto, and Midori Yamabuki in Dr. Slump. She is currently working for Channel 9.

== Voice roles ==
- Doraemon as Doraemon
- Naruto as Uzumaki Naruto
- Pokémon as Satoshi
- Dragon Ball as Goku (Child)
- Parman as Suwa Mitsuo/Parman
- Dr. Slump as Midori Yamabuki
