= Doraemon: Nobita and the Island of Miracles ~Animal Adventure~ =

2012 film by Kōzō Kusuba

- Theatrical release poster

Japanese name
- Kanji: 映画ドラえもん のび太と奇跡の島 ～アニマル アドベンチャー～
- Literal meaning: Doraemon: Nobita and the Island of Miracles ~Animal Adventure~
Transcriptions
- Revised Hepburn: Eiga Doraemon Nobita to Kiseki no Shima 〜Animal Adventure〜
- Directed by: Kōzō Kusuba
- Written by: Higashi Shimizu
- Produced by: Atsuishi Saitou; Momoko Kawawkita; Reina Takahashi; Rika Tsuruzaki; Shunsuke Okura; Takumi Fujimori
- Starring: Wasabi Mizuta; Megumi Ōhara; Yumi Kakazu; Tomokazu Seki; Subaru Kimura; Masako Nozawa; Atsuko Tanaka; Kouichi Yamadera; Nana Mizuki; Kotono Mitsuishi; Yasunori Matsumoto; Chiaki Fujimoto
- Cinematography: Katsuyoshi Kishi
- Music by: Kan Sawada
- Production company: Shin-Ei Animation
- Distributed by: Toho
- Release date: March 3, 2012 (Japan)
- Running time: 100 minutes
- Country: Japan
- Language: Japanese
- Box office: $47 million

Doraemon: Nobita and the Island of Miracles ~Animal Adventure~ (映画ドラえもん のび太と奇跡の島 ～アニマル アドベンチャー～, Eiga Doraemon Nobita to Kiseki no Shima 〜Animaru Adobenchā〜), also known as Doraemon the Movie 2012, Doraemon Animal Adventure and Doraemon the Movie: Nobita and the Last Haven -Animal Adventure-, is a 2012 Japanese animated science-fiction adventure film, based on the popular manga and anime series Doraemon. The 32nd Doraemon film, made in commemoration of Shogakukan's 90th anniversary, it was released in Japan on March 3, 2012.

== Plot ==
Nobita and his father Nobisuke buy a big Dynastinae, which he promises to his dad to take good care of it. Later, Doraemon's group finds a strange island where a tribe co-exists with prehistoric creatures long believed to be extinct yet preserved by a mythical beetle spirit named Golden Hercules. However, they have to deal with a group of criminals from the future who intend to capture Golden Hercules for profit. Nobita, his friends and Dake, Nobisuke's past self, decide to save the magical island from the evil Sherman and his henchmen.

== Voice cast ==
Character	Japanese voice actor
Doraemon	Wasabi Mizuta
Nobita Nobi	Megumi Ōhara
Shizuka Minamoto	Yumi Kakazu
Takeshi "Gian" Gōda	Subaru Kimura
Suneo Honekawa	Tomokazu Seki
Koron	Nana Mizuki
Young Nobisuke Nobi/Dakke	Masako Nozawa
Professor Kelly	Atsuko Tanaka
Dorami	Chiaki
Tamako Nobi	Kotono Mitsuishi
Nobisuke Nobi	Yasunori Matsumoto
Sharman	Kouichi Yamadera
Hidetoshi Dekisugi	Shihoko Hagino
Ouro	Yuzuru Fujimoto
Gonsuke	Naoki Tatsuta
Sky	Rikako Aikawa
Shun Amaguri	Shun Oguri
Nobita's grandmother	Miki Itou
Lock	Yuu Shimaka
Snake	Issei Futamata
Colon	Nana Mizuki
Kurajo	Yumi Kakazu
Furumo	Kisaichi Atsushi
Arco	Rintaro Nishi
Dogo	Mizuki Nakamura
Fuku	Fuku Suzuki
Sis	Yoko Oshita
Nadeshiko-chan	Yumiko Matsuo
Gourmet-chan	Naoko Kubota
Firmly-chan	Yuki Ohki
Leisurely-chan	Ayako Ishizawa
Osumashi-chan	Mariko Yokota
Wonderland-chan	Yukari Kita
Inspiration-chan	Midori Ishiki

=== Featured extinct animals ===
- Ceratogaulus
- Chalicotherium
- Dodo
- Elasmotherium
- Gastornis
- Glyptodon
- Megatherium
- Moa
- Paraceratherium
- Smilodon

== Marketing ==
A video game based on this film was released for the Nintendo 3DS in Japan on March 1, 2012.

== Release ==
=== Theatrical ===
This film was released In Japan on 3 March 2012. It was also released in India on 24 May 2013, under the title Doraemon the Movie Nobita aur Jadooi Tapu.

== Reception ==
=== Box office ===
The film earned ¥3.62 billion ($45,368,835) in Japanese theaters, and was ranked the 8th highest-grossing film of 2012 in Japan. Overseas, the film grossed ₩1,071,505,500 ($951,206) in South Korea, and $722,883 in Hong Kong and Thailand, for a worldwide total of $47,042,924.

== See also ==
- List of Doraemon films
- Fujiko Fujio
