= Yukiyo Teramoto =

Japanese animation director (born 1976)

- 寺本 幸代
- Born: February 25, 1976 (age 50); Fuji City, Shizuoka Prefecture
- Occupation: Animation director
- Years active: 2000–present
- Known for: Director of Doraemon films

Yukiyo Teramoto (寺本 幸代, Teramoto Yukiyo; born February 25, 1976) is a Japanese animation director.

== Biography ==
Teramoto was born in Fuji City, Shizuoka Prefecture on February 25, 1976.

After she graduated from Shizuoka Prefectural Fuji High School and attended the College of International Relations at Nihon University, she graduated from Yoyogi Animation Academy's Tokyo school and joined Vega Entertainment in 2000. The first volume of the original video animation series Anime Koten Bungakukan marked her directorial debut.

She has handled storyboards and episode direction for episodes of the 2005 Doraemon television series since its premiere.

In 2007, she became the first female director in the Doraemon movie series history when she served as director of Doraemon: Nobita's New Great Adventure into the Underworld. She would go on to serve as director of Doraemon: Nobita and the New Steel Troops ~Winged Angels~ in 2011, Doraemon: Nobita's Secret Gadget Museum in 2013, and Doraemon: Nobita's Art World Tales in 2025.

== Filmography ==
=== Television animation ===
List of contributions in television animation
| Year | Title | Role | Notes | Source |
|---|---|---|---|---|
| 1999–2001 | Shūkan Storyland | Production manager | | |
| 2000–2001 | Hamster Club | Episode director | | |
| 2001 | Cosmo Warrior Zero | Storyboard, episode director | | |
| 2001 | Babel II: Beyond Infinity | Storyboard, episode director | | |
| 2002 | Gun Frontier | Storyboard, episode director | | |
| 2002–2003 | Fortune Dogs | Storyboard, episode director | | |
| 2003 | Submarine Super 99 | Storyboard, episode director | | |
| 2004 | Gokusen | Storyboard, episode director | | |
| 2004–2005 | Monster | Episode director | | |
| 2005–present | Doraemon | Storyboard, episode director | | |
| 2007–2008 | Neuro: Supernatural Detective | Storyboard, episode director | | |
| 2011–2014 | Hunter x Hunter | Storyboard, episode director | | |
| 2014–2015 | Mysterious Joker | Chief director, storyboard, episode director | | |
| 2017 | Crayon Shin-chan | Storyboard | | |
| 2021 | Battle Game in 5 Seconds | Storyboard, episode director | | |

=== Theatrical animation ===
List of contributions in theatrical animation
| Year | Title | Role | Notes | Source |
|---|---|---|---|---|
| 2007 | Doraemon: Nobita's New Great Adventure into the Underworld ~The Seven Magic Users~ | Director, storyboard | | |
| 2010 | Doraemon: Nobita's Great Battle of the Mermaid King | Animation (Omake) | | |
| 2011 | Doraemon: Nobita and the New Steel Troops ~Winged Angels~ | Director, storyboard | | |
| 2012 | Doraemon: Nobita and the Island of Miracles ~Animal Adventure~ | Animation (Omake) | | |
| 2013 | Doraemon: Nobita's Secret Gadget Museum | Director, storyboard | | |
| 2013 | Hospitality Department | Director | | |
| 2020 | The Chronicles of Rebecca | Director, storyboard | | |
| 2024 | Doraemon: Nobita's Earth Symphony | Animation (Omake) | | |
| 2025 | Doraemon: Nobita's Art World Tales | Director, storyboard, animation (ED) | | |
