= Yumi Kakazu =

Japanese voice actress (born 1973)

- かかず ゆみ
- Born: Yumi Kakazu (嘉数 由美); June 18, 1973 (age 53); Iruma, Saitama Prefecture, Japan
- Occupation: Voice actress
- Years active: 1996–present
- Agent: Aoni Production
- Notable credits: Compilation of Final Fantasy VII as Yuffie Kisaragi; Ceres, Celestial Legend as Aya Mikage; Doraemon as Shizuka Minamoto; The King of Fighters as Kula Diamond; Tokyo Mew Mew as Mint Aizawa; Initial D as Sayuki
- Spouse: Undisclosed (m. 2004; died 2009)
- Children: 2
- Website: Official profile

Yumi Kakazu (かかず ゆみ, Kakazu Yumi; born June 18, 1973) is a Japanese voice actress affiliated with Aoni Production.

== Biography ==
=== Early life ===
Born in Iruma, Saitama Prefecture, Japan on June 18, 1973, she hadn't always dreamed of becoming a voice actress since childhood. Unable to decide on a specific career path, she attended a domestic science junior college. At the time, she had only a vague idea about her future, thinking it might be nice to work in the apparel industry, perhaps with children's clothing.

Initially, she wanted to become an actress, and while attending junior college, she worked part-time jobs—including customer service, event announcer, and telemarketing—during which she discovered the joy of self-expression. She had asked herself what she really wanted to do, and turned down a job offer in the service industry and decided to pursue her dream of becoming an actress, so began attending acting rehearsals and workshops.

Around that time, she met someone who introduced her to people at an agency, and she ended up signing with them. Driven by a passion to work in TV dramas and films, she sought out and applied for opportunities through audition magazines, which she gained valuable experience from as a background extra actor.

While she was taking various auditions, she happened to meet someone who was well-versed in the anime industry. One of the auditions this person brought her to was for a voice-acting role, which gave her the opportunity to audition as a voice actress, and in April 1996, she made her voice-acting debut as Sala Tyrell in After War Gundam X.

=== Career ===
In 1997, she served as a reporter on local travel programs and other shows. Since regular anime recording sessions are typically held once a week, which makes it difficult to balance with on-location filming, she decided to focus on work as a reporter and stepped away from anime for a year.

In 1998, she told to keep working as a reporter, but around that time, she was also auditioning for anime roles and had been cast in a few. Realizing she found the appeal of acting and thought, "If I work hard, maybe I can do this for a long time", she agonized over the decision before ultimately deciding to choose the path of voice acting. Her family's support was a major factor in her decision. She spoke with her mother, an avid radio listener, who pushed her forward telling her, "It's wonderful to express yourself through your voice."

As of April 2005, she has been the voice of the female protagonist Shizuka Minamoto in the Doraemon franchise, replacing Michiko Nomura, starting with the third Doraemon television anime series. The offer to audition was sent over to her talent agency at the time and she initially auditioned for the roles of Doraemon, Suneo, and Gian, but her performances came out so funny that it caused everyone to laugh. She then tried to audition for Nobita as well, but in the end it was decided on Shizuka as the only choice for her and sent over her audio tape. At that time, she felt like she was just taking an exam for the experience and was just happy and excited to be involved with Doraemon. Because the series was so massive, she never imagined she would end up being chosen. During the final audition, she was the only one asked about her age by the judges during the Q&A session. Since age had never been brought up in voice auditions before, she found it strange and instinctively shot back, "Does my age affect the evaluation?" "That confident side of me fit Shizuka's image," she said, adding that she has "nothing but gratitude" for the judge who asked about her age. "He later told me that my attitude during the final interview was one of the reasons he chose me, saying, 'Shizuka has a bit of a strong-willed side, and that's exactly what I liked about her.'" When she was chosen, she felt anxious, wondering, "Will my voice be okay?" because she could not produce the exact same voice as the Shizuka she had heard up until then.

She was affiliated with Genki Project until August 2009. After working as a freelancer, she joined Atomic Monkey on October 1, 2011, and has been affiliated with Aoni Production as of April 1, 2022.

== Personal life ==
She got married on June 1, 2004. Her husband was a non-celebrity, with no personal details having been made public.

Her first son was born in late August 2005. Before his birth, she herself was already aware of her maternity leave around the spring of that year. However, she was busy as a series of new jobs were lined up during the spring programming reshuffle, delaying her announcement.

Because she wanted to "raise her children in nature," she began living in Saitama after marriage, but as mentioned earlier, once she was cast in a long-running TV show, she began commuting to Tokyo more frequently. Because her husband was also working in Tokyo, balancing childcare, work, and commuting became a challenge, so consequently, they chose to settle down in Tokyo.

Her second son was born in 2008. However, shortly after the first birthday of her second son, her husband suddenly died from a cerebral hemorrhage at the age of 42. Devastated and shocked by the event, she chose to not make it public for four years until finally revealing it on her Twitter in June 2013. Her second son was too young to understand what was happening at the time, so has almost no memory of his father.

== Filmography ==
=== Television animation ===
- After War Gundam X (Sala Tyrell) (voice acting debut)
- AKB0048 (Katagiri Tsubasa / Shinoda Mariko The 7th)
- Ask Dr. Rin! (Banri Shijō)
- Baka and Test series (Yōko Takahashi)
- Black Heaven (OL)
- Bleach (Ririn, Gina)
- The Candidate for Goddess (Leena Fujimura, Yukine Simmons)
- Ceres, The Celestial Legend (Aya Mikage)
- Cyber Team in Akihabara (Dark Pigeon/Hatoko Daikan'yama)
- Descendants of Darkness (Maki)
- Devil May Cry: The Animated Series (Cindy)
- D.I.C.E. (Marsha Rizarov)
- Divergence Eve (Misaki Kureha)
- Do It Yourself!! (Haruko Hoketsu)
- Doraemon (2005–present), (Shizuka Minamoto)
- Fate/kaleid liner Prisma Illya 3rei!! (Magical Sapphire)
- Flint the Time Detective (Princess Kaguya, Yunīta)
- Fullmetal Alchemist (Lyra/Dante)
- Gantz (Sadayo Suzumura)
- Geneshaft (Lieutenant Mir Lotus)
- Genesis of Aquarion (Silvia de Alisia)
- Ghost in the Shell: Stand Alone Complex (Tokura Eka)
- Godannar (Shizuru Fujimura)
- Healin' Good Pretty Cure (Mei Hiramatsu)
- Hikaru no Go (Akari Fujisaki)
- Hoshin Engi (Daji)
- Hungry Heart: Wild Striker (Rie Koboku)
- Initial D (Sayuki)
- Inuyasha (Eri, Ayame)
- The King of Braves GaoGaiGar Final -Grand Glorious Gathering- (Renais Cardiff Shishio)
- Kochira Katsushika-ku Kameari Kōen-mae Hashutsujo (Ibu Honda (second voice))
- Kyo Kara Maoh! (Miko Shibuya)
- Loveless (Yamato Nakano)
- Lovely Idol (Reiko Nakazawa)
- Machine Robo Rescue (Nina)
- Medabots (Kokuryū, Momoko)
- Meine Liebe (Robertine)
- Mon Colle Knights (Songstress of the Flower Garden)
- Nobunaga the Fool (Hiraga Gennai)
- Nura: Rise of the Yokai Clan (Kejoro)
- One Piece (Hera, Misery)
- Onegai My Melody (Johnny)
- Onmyō Taisenki (Misasa)
- Ojarumaru (Mutsuko)
- Pokémon (Kei, Mikan)
- Pokémon: Advanced Generation (Annu)
- RahXephon (Hiroko Asahina)
- Rockman.EXE Stream (Meddy)
- Saikano (Satomi)
- Saint Beast (Yuria)
- Samurai Deeper Kyo (Okuni, Jijin)
- Sister Princess (Haruka)
- Skull Man (Sayoko Karasuma)
- Someday's Dreamers (Takako Kawara)
- Soreike! Anpanman (Isoben)
- Steam Detectives (Misa Anan, newspaper reporter (Lily Edogawa))
- Stratos 4 (Mikaze Honjō)
- Superior Defender Gundam Force (Alicia)
- Super Robot Wars Original Generation: Divine Wars (Seolla Schweitzer)
- Tokyo Mew Mew (Mint Aizawa)
- Tsukihime, Lunar Legend (Hisui)
- Tsukuyomi -Moon Phase- (Elfriede)
- Uta Kata (Maki)
- Vampiyan Kids (Princess Castanet)
- Vandread (Dita Liebely)
- Yu-Gi-Oh! (1998 series) (Anzu Mazaki)
- Cocotama Series
  - Kamisama Minarai: Himitsu no Cocotama (Oshaki)
  - Kira Kira Happy Hirake! Cocotama (Ojou)

=== Theatrical animation ===
List of voice performances in theatrical animation
Year	Title	Role	Note	Source
1999	Yu-Gi-Oh!	Anzu Mazaki		
1999	Cyber Team in Akihabara: Summer Vacation of 2011	Hatoko Daikanyama		
2001	Initial D Third Stage	Sayuki		
2002	Pia Carrot e Yōkoso!! ~Sayaka no Koi Monogatari~	Sayaka Takai		
2003	RahXephon: Pluralitas Concentio	Hiroko Asahina		
2005	Fullmetal Alchemist the Movie: Conqueror of Shamballa	Actress		
2006	Doraemon: Nobita's Dinosaur 2006	Shizuka Minamoto		
2007	Doraemon: Nobita's New Great Adventure into the Underworld ~The Seven Magic Users~	Shizuka Minamoto		
2007	Aquarion the Movie	Silvia de Alisia		
2007	Cinnamon The Movie	Mocha		
2008	Doraemon: Nobita and the Green Giant Legend	Shizuka Minamoto		
2009	Doraemon: The New Record of Nobita's Spaceblazer	Shizuka Minamoto		
2010	Doraemon: Nobita's Great Battle of the Mermaid King	Shizuka Minamoto		
2011	Doraemon: Nobita and the New Steel Troops ~Winged Angels~	Shizuka Minamoto		
2012	Doraemon: Nobita and the Island of Miracles ~Animal Adventure~	Shizuka Minamoto, Kurajo		
2013	Doraemon: Nobita's Secret Gadget Museum	Shizuka Minamoto		
2014	Buddha 2: Tezuka Osamu no Buddha ~Owarinaki Tabi~	Princess Yashodara		
2014	Doraemon: Nobita in the New Haunts of Evil ~Peko and the Five Explorers~	Shizuka Minamoto		
2014	Stand by Me Doraemon	Shizuka Minamoto, Future Shizuka Minamoto		
2015	Doraemon: Nobita's Space Heroes	Shizuka Minamoto		
2015	Anata o Zutto Aishiteru	Additional voice		
2016	Doraemon: Nobita and the Birth of Japan 2016	Shizuka Minamoto		
2017	Doraemon: Nobita's Great Adventure in the Antarctic Kachi Kochi	Shizuka Minamoto		
2017	Gō-chan. ~Moko and the Friends of the Forest of Chinju~	Secretary		
2017	Cocotama: Secret Apprentice Gods the Movie: Make a Miracle♪ Tepple and the Exciting Cocotama World	Oshaki		
2017	Fate/kaleid liner Prisma Illya: Vow in the Snow	Magical Sapphire		
2018	Doraemon: Nobita's Treasure Island	Shizuka Minamoto		
2018	Gō-chan. ~Moko and the Promise on the Ice~	Professor Takeda		
2019	Doraemon: Nobita's Chronicle of the Moon Exploration	Shizuka Minamoto		
2019	Fate/kaleid liner Prisma Illya: Prisma Phantasm	Magical Sapphire		
2020	Doraemon: Nobita's New Dinosaur	Shizuka Minamoto		
2020	Stand by Me Doraemon 2	Shizuka Minamoto, Future Shizuka Minamoto		
2021	Fate/kaleid liner Prisma Illya: Licht - The Nameless Girl	Magical Sapphire		
2022	Doraemon: Nobita's Little Star Wars 2021	Shizuka Minamoto		
2023	Doraemon: Nobita's Sky Utopia	Shizuka Minamoto		
2024	Doraemon: Nobita's Earth Symphony	Shizuka Minamoto		
2025	Doraemon: Nobita's Art World Tales	Shizuka Minamoto		
2026	Doraemon: New Nobita and the Castle of the Undersea Devil	Shizuka Minamoto		
2027	Doraemon: Nobita's Steam-Powered Time Machine	Shizuka Minamoto		

=== Original video animation (OVA) ===
List of voice performances in original video animation
Year	Title	Role	Note	Source
1999	Legend of the Galactic Heroes: Spiral Labyrinth	Mirriam Roses		
2000	The King of Braves GaoGaiGar Final	Renais Cardiff Shishio		
2000	Initial D: Extra Stage	Sayuki		
2002	Special Curriculum: The Candidate for Goddess	Leena Fujimura		
2003	True Love Story Summer Days, and yet...	Akimi Arimori		
2004	Tenbatsu! Angel Rabbie	Fia Note		
2005	Stratos 4 Advance	Mikaze Honjou		
2005	Super Robot Wars Original Generation: The Animation	Seolla Schweizer		
2005	Final Fantasy VII: Advent Children	Yuffie Kisaragi		
2007	Genesis of Aquarion	Silvia de Alisia		
2008	Initial D Extra Stage 2	Sayuki		
2009	Nodame Cantabile: I Got M・fil.	Caroline		
2011	Baka to Test to Shōkanjū: Matsuri	Yōko Takahashi		
2013	Zetsumetsu Kigu Shōjo Amazing Twins	Nanae Fudō		
2015	Sōsei no Aquarion Love	Silvia de Alisia		
2019	Fate/kaleid liner Prisma Illya: Prisma Phantasm	Magical Sapphire		

=== Video games ===
- Another Century's Episode 3 (2007) (Sala Tyrell)
- Arknights (Harmonie)
- Inazuma Eleven (2008) (Otonashi Haruna)
- Castlevania: Portrait of Ruin (Charlotte Aulin)
- Dead or Alive 6 (Kula Diamond)
- Ehrgeiz (Yuffie Kisaragi)
- Fate/Grand Order (Magical Sapphire)
- Final Fantasy
  - Dirge of Cerberus: Final Fantasy VII (Yuffie Kisaragi)
  - Dissidia Final Fantasy Opera Omnia (Yuffie Kisaragi)
  - Final Fantasy VII Remake Intergrade (Yuffie Kisaragi)
  - Final Fantasy VII Rebirth (Yuffie Kisaragi)
- Fire Emblem Heroes (Ethlyn)
- Granblue Fantasy (Shizuka Minamoto)
- Initial D Arcade Stage series (Sayuki)
- Kingdom Hearts (Yuffie Kisaragi)
- Kingdom Hearts II (Yuffie Kisaragi)
- Kingdom Hearts III Re Mind (Yuffie Kisaragi)
- The King of Fighters
  - The King of Fighters 2000 (Kula Diamond, Lilly Kane)
  - The King of Fighters 2001 (Kula Diamond)
  - The King of Fighters 2002 (Kula Diamond)
  - The King of Fighters XI (Kula Diamond)
  - The King of Fighters: Maximum Impact 2 (Kula Diamond, Lilly Kane)
  - The King of Fighters XIII (Kula Diamond)
  - The King of Fighters XIV (Kula Diamond)
  - The King of Fighters All Star (Kula Diamond)
  - The King of Fighters XV (Kula Diamond)
- Neo Geo Heroes: Ultimate Shooting (Kula Diamond)
- Samurai Shodown: Warriors Rage (Mikoto)
- Shinobi Master Senran Kagura: New Link (Kula Diamond)
- SNK Heroines: Tag Team Frenzy (Kula Diamond)
- Super Robot Wars
  - Super Robot Wars Alpha Gaiden (Sala Tyrell)
  - Super Robot Wars Alpha 2 (Seolla Schweizer)
  - Super Robot Wars GC (Fairy Firefly)
  - Super Robot Wars Alpha 3 (Seolla Schweizer, Renais Cardiff Shishio)
  - Super Robot Wars Original Generations (Seolla Schweizer)
  - Super Robot Wars Z (Silvia de Alisia, Sala Tyrell, Celiane)
- Tales series
  - Tales of Versus (Nanaly Fletch)
  - Tales of the World: Radiant Mythology 3 (Nanaly Fletch)
  - Tales of the Ray (Nanaly Fletch)
- Tokyo Mew Mew (Mint Aizawa)
