= List of 2013 box office number-one films in Japan =

This is a list of films which placed number one at the weekend box office in Japan for the year 2013. It lists the films with the highest box office gross only.

== Number-one films ==
†	This implies the highest-grossing movie of the year.

#	Date	Film	Gross	Notes
1	January 6, 2013	One Piece Film: Z	$3,722,309	
2	January 13, 2013	Hunter × Hunter: Phantom Rouge	$5,268,503	
3	January 20, 2013	Ted	$3,761,835	
4	January 27, 2013	Ted	$3,812,481	
5	February 3, 2013	Ted	$3,443,900	
6	February 10, 2013	Ted	$3,452,854	
7	February 17, 2013	A Good Day to Die Hard	$4,338,002	
8	February 24, 2013	A Good Day to Die Hard	$2,800,841	
9	March 3, 2013	Flight	$1,685,052	
10	March 10, 2013	Doraemon: Nobita no Himitsu Dōgu Museum	$7,129,947	
11	March 17, 2013	Doraemon: Nobita no Himitsu Dōgu Museum	$4,578,715	
12	March 24, 2013	Wreck-It Ralph	$3,629,743	
13	March 31, 2013	Dragon Ball Z: Battle of Gods	$7,307,670	
14	April 7, 2013	Dragon Ball Z: Battle of Gods	$4,551,222	
15	April 14, 2013	Dragon Ball Z: Battle of Gods	$2,452,772	
16	April 21, 2013	Detective Conan: Private Eye in the Distant Sea	$7,203,139	
17	April 28, 2013	Detective Conan: Private Eye in the Distant Sea	$4,342,885	
18	May 5, 2013	Detective Conan: Private Eye in the Distant Sea	$4,609,260	
19	May 12, 2013	Detective Conan: Private Eye in the Distant Sea	$1,527,213	
20	May 19, 2013	The Complex	$1,486,523	
21	May 26, 2013	The Complex	$1,360,908	
22	June 2, 2013	Oblivion	$3,481,395	
23	June 9, 2013	G.I. Joe: Retaliation	$2,129,567	
24	June 16, 2013	The Great Gatsby	$1,715,978	
25	June 23, 2013	After Earth	$2,047,066	
26	June 30, 2013	Midsummer's Equation	$4,690,261	
27	July 7, 2013	Monsters University	$8,374,662	
28	July 14, 2013	Monsters University	$7,098,756	
29	July 21, 2013	Monsters University	N/A	N/A
30	July 28, 2013	The Wind Rises †	$8,256,371	
31	August 4, 2013	The Wind Rises †	$5,615,496	
32	August 11, 2013	The Wind Rises †	$5,303,857	
33	August 18, 2013	The Wind Rises †	$4,857,944	
34	August 25, 2013	The Wind Rises †	$3,252,233	
35	September 1, 2013	The Wind Rises †	$3,451,449	
36	September 8, 2013	The Wind Rises †	$4,598,539	
37	September 15, 2013	Ataru	$3,575,077	
38	September 22, 2013	Despicable Me 2	$3,386,836	
39	September 29, 2013	Like Father, Like Son	$3,187,972	
40	October 6, 2013	Like Father, Like Son	$2,991,662	
41	October 13, 2013	Girl in the Sunny Place	$2,763,297	
42	October 20, 2013	Girl in the Sunny Place	$1,897,618	
43	October 27, 2013	Puella Magi Madoka Magica the Movie: Rebellion	$4,000,000	
44	November 3, 2013	SPEC: Close	$4,641,672	
45	November 10, 2013	The Kiyosu Conference	$4,883,559	
46	November 17, 2013	The Kiyosu Conference	$3,315,484	
47	November 24, 2013	The Tale of the Princess Kaguya	$2,806,877	
48	December 1, 2013	The Tale of the Princess Kaguya	$2,607,679	
49	December 8, 2013	Lupin III vs. Conan	$6,314,596	
50	December 15, 2013	Lupin III vs. Conan	$4,584,562	
51	December 22, 2013	Lupin III vs. Conan	N/A	N/A
52	December 29, 2013	The Eternal Zero	$3,536,842	

== Highest-grossing films ==
International film Japanese film

Highest-grossing films of 2013
Rank	Title	Gross
1	The Wind Rises	¥12.02 billion ($123.16 million)
2	Monsters University	¥8.96 billion ($91.81 million)
3	One Piece Film: Z	¥6.87 billion ($70.39 million)
4	Les Misérables	¥5.89 billion ($60.35 million)
5	Ted	¥4.23 billion ($43.34 million)
6	Doraemon: Nobita's Secret Gadget Museum	¥3.98 billion ($40.78 million)
7	Detective Conan: Private Eye in the Distant Sea	¥3.63 billion ($37.19 million)
8	Midsummer's Equation	¥3.31 billion ($33.92 million)
9	The After-Dinner Mysteries	¥3.25 billion ($33.3 million)
10	Like Father, Like Son	¥3.20 billion ($32.79 million)

== See also ==
- List of Japanese films of 2013
