= Megumi Ōhara =

Japanese voice actress (born 1975)

- 大原 めぐみ
- Born: April 16, 1975 (age 51); Tokyo, Japan
- Occupation: Voice actress
- Years active: 2005–present
- Agent: Kekke Corporation
- Notable credit: Doraemon as Nobita Nobi
- Spouse: 1
- Children: 2
- Website: Official profile

Megumi Ōhara (大原 めぐみ, Ōhara Megumi; born April 16, 1975) is a Japanese voice actress. She was born in Tokyo and is affiliated with Kekke Corporation.

Ōhara is most well known for being the current voice actress of Nobita Nobi in the Doraemon media franchise since 2005, starting with the Doraemon television series.

== Filmography ==
=== Television animation ===
List of voice performances in television animation
Year	Title	Role(s)	Notes	Source
2005–present	Doraemon	Nobita Nobi	Main role	
2010	Stitch!	Female couple, Girl A, Student F, Woman, Yotsuko	Yotsuko in Ep. 14	
2010	And Yet the Town Moves	Young Natsuhiko Moriaki; Reporter	Reporter in Ep. 10	
2019–2020	Furball Gonjiro	Hades	Eps 38–39	
2020–2022	Motto! Majime ni Fumajime Kaiketsu Zorori	Fulls, Hulds		
2026	Magical Sisters LuluttoLilly	Shio Nonoyama	Main role	

=== Theatrical animation ===
List of voice performances in theatrical animation
Year	Title	Role	Source
2006	Doraemon: Nobita's Dinosaur 2006	Nobita Nobi	
2007	Doraemon: Nobita's New Great Adventure into the Underworld	Nobita Nobi	
2008	Doraemon: Nobita and the Green Giant Legend	Nobita Nobi	
2009	Doraemon the Movie: Nobita's Spaceblazer	Nobita Nobi	
2010	Doraemon: Nobita's Great Battle of the Mermaid King	Nobita Nobi	
2011	Doraemon: Nobita and the New Steel Troops—Winged Angels	Nobita Nobi	
2012	Doraemon: Nobita and the Island of Miracles—Animal Adventure	Nobita Nobi	
2013	Doraemon: Nobita's Secret Gadget Museum	Nobita Nobi	
2014	Doraemon: New Nobita's Great Demon—Peko and the Exploration Party of Five	Nobita Nobi	
2014	Stand by Me Doraemon	Nobita Nobi	
2015	Doraemon: Nobita's Space Heroes	Nobita Nobi	
2016	Doraemon: Nobita and the Birth of Japan 2016	Nobita Nobi	
2017	Doraemon the Movie 2017: Great Adventure in the Antarctic Kachi Kochi	Nobita Nobi	
2018	Doraemon the Movie: Nobita's Treasure Island	Nobita Nobi	
2019	Doraemon: Nobita's Chronicle of the Moon Exploration	Nobita Nobi	
2020	Doraemon: Nobita's New Dinosaur	Nobita Nobi	
2020	Stand by Me Doraemon 2	Nobita Nobi	
2022	Doraemon: Nobita's Little Star Wars 2021	Nobita Nobi	
2023	Doraemon: Nobita's Sky Utopia	Nobita Nobi	
2024	Doraemon: Nobita's Earth Symphony	Nobita Nobi	
2025	Doraemon: Nobita's Art World Tales	Nobita Nobi	
2026	Doraemon: New Nobita and the Castle of the Undersea Devil	Nobita Nobi	
2027	Doraemon: Nobita's Steam-Powered Time Machine	Nobita Nobi	

=== Video games ===
List of voice performances in video games
Year	Title	Role	Source
2006	Doraemon: Nobita's Dinosaur 2006 DS	Nobita Nobi	
2007	Doraemon: Nobita no Shin Makai Daibouken DS	Nobita Nobi	
2007	Doraemon Wii	Nobita Nobi	
2008	Doraemon: Nobita and the Green Giant Legend DS	Nobita Nobi	
2021	Granblue Fantasy	Nobita Nobi	

=== Dubbing roles ===
==== Feature films ====
List of voice performances in feature film dubbing
Year	Title	Role	Notes	Source
2013	Frankenstein's Army	Eva (Cristina Catalina)		

==== Animation ====
List of voice performances in animation dubbing
Year	Title	Role	Notes	Source
2014–2015	Doraemon: Gadget Cat from the Future	Noby Nobi (Johnny Yong Bosch)		
2019–present	Pinkfong Wonderstar	Hogi (Soeun Lee)		
