= Doraemon: Nobita's New Great Adventure into the Underworld =

2007 film by Yukiyo Teramoto

Doraemon the Movie: Nobita's New Great Adventure into the Underworld ~The 7 Magic Users~
- Theatrical release poster

Japanese name
- Kanji: 映画ドラえもん のび太の新魔界大冒険 〜7人の魔法使い〜
- Literal meaning: Doraemon: Nobita's New Great Adventure into the Underworld - The Seven Magic Users
Transcriptions
- Revised Hepburn: Doraemon: Nobita no Shin Makai Daibōken 7 ~Shichinin no Mahō Tsukai
- Directed by: Yukiyo Teramoto
- Screenplay by: Yuichi Shinbo
- Based on: Doraemon's Long Stories: Nobita's Great Adventure into the Underworld by Fujiko F. Fujio
- Produced by: Takumi Fujimori; Kumi Ogura; Tatsuji Yamazaki; Daisuke Yoshikawa
- Starring: Wasabi Mizuta; Megumi Ōhara; Yumi Kakazu; Tomokazu Seki; Subaru Kimura; Chiaki; Saki Aibu; Junichi Koumoto; Masami Hisamoto; Banjō Ginga
- Cinematography: Masahiro Kumagai
- Edited by: Hajime Okayasu
- Music by: Kan Sawada
- Production company: Shin-Ei Animation
- Distributed by: Toho
- Release date: March 10, 2007 (Japan)
- Running time: 112 minutes
- Country: Japan
- Language: Japanese
- Box office: $42.0 million

Doraemon: Nobita's New Great Adventure into the Underworld (映画ドラえもん のび太の新魔界大冒険 〜7人の魔法使い〜, Doraemon: Nobita no Shin Makai Daibōken ~7-nin no Mahō Tsukai~), also advertised as Doraemon the Movie 2007, is a 2007 Japanese animated science fantasy film.

Directed by Yukiyo Teramoto, it is the 27th feature film in the Doraemon franchise and is a remake of the 5th film Doraemon: Nobita's Great Adventure into the Underworld from 1984. It released in Japan on March 10, 2007, and became the second highest grossing anime movie of that year.

== Plot ==
The film opens with Professor Mangetsu, a Japanese astrophysicist and his daughter, Miyoko, being informed and startled about the approach of a giant black hole that previously destroyed the space probe Voyager 5. It is confirmed that this black hole is headed towards Earth.

Frustrated by the multitude of problems at school and at home, Nobita wonders if his life would be easier if magic really existed. Doraemon tells that magic is just a superstition and there is no way he can help. At the same time when they re-enter their room, a statue of Doraemon crashes in, surprising them both. Shizuka then calls them saying there's a statue of Nobita in the field. Both of them are confused and choose to store them in the backyard.

At night, the family is surprised when the statues appear inside in a different position. They are unable to find out the truth and simply put the statues in Doraemon's magic pocket. At midnight, Doraemon suddenly gets a stomachache and rushes to the 22nd century to came as a shock to Dorami and Sewashi, who tried to rush him to the hospital, but returns after it suddenly stops. Upon returning, Nobita tells him that they can use the "What if" Telephone Booth to enter a world where magic is normalized.

Nobita discovers that they still cannot use magic, since they need to learn it like science. He is bored again and wants to return. But decides against it after Gian and Suneo tease him about the matter. While learning magic, Nobita and Doraemon find out that he is only able to flip Shizuka's "shirt" using magic. When they finish training, the group see a falling object coming down to Earth.

They fly there to examine the crash site, where they meet Miyoko, who is a high-class magic user and states that a demonic planet will destroy Earth very soon. Professor Mangetsu also reveals that Miyoko's mom struck a deal with the Demon King to save Miyoko from death. The only way to save Earth, according to him, is noted in the tome of magic and he tells of impending doom if it fails.

Satisfied with what he has achieved, Nobita wishes to return to the normal world. However, upon arrival, Mrs. Nobi throws it away to the landfill, and the Telephone Booth was destroyed making both of them distraught. Later, an earthquake occurs, and Doraemon and Nobita head to Miyoko's home, where they save Miyoko from being killed. She then reveals that her father has been taken to the Demon Planet, that she escaped by luck, and asks Doraemon and Nobita for help to save her father. Eventually, she decides to leave alone as she does not want to endanger her friends.

As more natural disasters occur, Doraemon's group decide to help "Miyoko" find the tome to defeat the demons. However, when they find the tome, "Miyoko" attacks Gian to get the tome and reveals herself as Medusa, a demoness under the control of the Demon King. She tries to kill the group by locking them in ice; however, they escape. They find that the tome was actually divided into two halves, which provides them a chance to save Earth.

At the same time, they find the real Miyoko, who appears as a mouse, whose curse is lifted under the light of the moon. As Doraemon is afraid of mice, the group casts a different spell to turn Miyoko into a cat, as their power cannot lift the curse. United, they then go to the Demon Planet to defeat the Demon King and rescue Miyoko's father.

The group manages to break into the Demon Castle, armed with silver arrows to kill the Demon King. However, it does not work, and they attempt to flee. Only Nobita and Doraemon manage to escape while the rest are captured and locked inside the Castle. Doraemon realises that they can undo everything by going back in time to stop Nobita in the past from requesting to change the real world into the magical world, but they are turned to stone by Medusa, who managed to follow them.

Dorami, Doraemon's sister, discovers the statues of the future Doraemon and Nobita inside the pocket of the past Doraemon, and uses the Time Cape to bring them back to their normal forms. Doraemon and Nobita plan to use Dorami's Phone Booth to return to the real world. A fake ending plays, but then Nobita realises that the world will still be threatened even when they go back to normal. They decide to head back and slay the Demon King.

They arrive on the Demon Planet again and rescue everyone, including Professor Mangetsu. They then head to the moon, where Medusa is trying to destroy the moon's power. As long as Medusa looks at Miyoko, she becomes dizzy and cannot control her body and stabs her sword into the Moon. The Demon King, enraged by the actions of Doraemon's group, brings his whole army to invade Earth at once.

On the moon, Doraemon's group fails to stop Medusa from destroying the moon's power that protects the Earth, which destroys the demonic form of Medusa, revealing that she is Miyoko's mother. Miyoko's mother tells that her soul has been taken away when she dealt with the Demon King and reveals that there is a red moon on the Demon Planet, which is the Demon King's heart, explaining why they failed to kill him earlier. She then disappears, while Miyoko and her father mourn.

The group, on the flying carpet, then race to destroy the heart of the Demon King. It is nearly impossible at first as the army heavily outnumbers and surrounds them. Doraemon suddenly comes up with an idea and uses the Anywhere Door to go near the Demon king's heart. Nobita shoots an arrow that has been enlarged by the Enlarging Light, and they destroy the heart, along with the Demon Planet and its army.

During the credits, they return to Earth and rebuild Miyoko's home, with her bidding Nobita farewell. In the real world, Miyoko, her father and the space center are relieved to see that the black hole vanished before reaching Earth. Nobita goes back to the real world, forgetting everything and believing it to be a dream. After the credits, Nobita tries to cast a spell, but he surprisingly gets the same result as in the Magic World, but attributes it to the wind, while the broom they used to escape Medusa still sits on the tree.

== Cast ==
Character	Japanese voice actor
Doraemon	Wasabi Mizuta
Nobita Nobi	Megumi Ohara
Shizuka Minamoto	Yumi Kakazu
Takeshi "Gian" Gōda	Subaru Kimura
Suneo Honekawa	Tomokazu Seki
Dorami	Chiaki
Hidetoshi Dekisugi	Shihoko Hagino
Nobisuke Nobi	Yasunori Matsumoto
Tamako Nobi	Kotono Mitsuishi
Sewashi	Sachi Matsumoto
Teacher	Wataru Takagi
Miyoko Mangetsu	Saki Aibu
Professor Mangetsu	Junichi Koumoto
Mrs. Mangetsu	Masami Hisamoto
Medusa	Masami Hisamoto
Demon Evil King	Banjō Ginga
Devil Monkey	Tyas Mirasih

== Video game ==
Doraemon: Nobita no Shin Makai Daibouken DS (ドラえもん のび太の新魔界大冒険 DS) is the card battle game based on the movie, released for the Nintendo DS system. It utilized the Nintendo Wi-Fi Connection feature, allowing players to battle each other online.

== See also ==
- List of Doraemon films
