= Kan Sawada =

Japanese composer (born 1968)

Kan Sawada 沢田 完
- Born: 9 April 1968 (age 58); Tokyo, Japan
- Genres: Film score, electronic
- Occupation: Composer
- Website: https://kansawada.com/

Kan Sawada (沢田 完, Sawada Kan) (born 9 April 1968) is a Japanese composer and arranger.

His desire to be a composer came from listening to Ludwig van Beethoven's symphonies in junior high school. Sawada studied composition and orchestration at Tokyo College of Music. He won the 2nd prize in the composition category 69th The Music Competition of Japan and the E. Nakamichi Award.

Sawada has composed for films, TV dramas, animations, and stages, and has composed and arranged for vocalists.

== Works ==
- Sensual Phrase (1999)
- Jibaku-kun (1999)
- Doraemon (2005–present)
- Doraemon: Nobita's Dinosaur 2006 (2006)
- Doraemon: Nobita's New Great Adventure into the Underworld (2007)
- Doraemon: Nobita and the Green Giant Legend (2008)
- Doraemon: The New Record of Nobita's Spaceblazer (2009)
- Doraemon: Nobita's Great Battle of the Mermaid King (2010)
- Doraemon: Nobita and the New Steel Troops ~Winged Angels~ (2011)
- Doraemon: Nobita and the Island of Miracles ~Animal Adventure~ (2012)
- Doraemon: Nobita's Secret Gadget Museum (2013)
- Doraemon: Nobita in the New Haunts of Evil ~Peko and the Five Explorers~ (2014)
- Doraemon: Nobita's Space Heroes (2015)
- Doraemon: Nobita and the Birth of Japan 2016 (2016)
- Doraemon: Nobita's Great Adventure in the Antarctic Kachi Kochi (2017)
- Grave of the Fireflies (2005)
- 14-sai no Haha (2006)
- Moonlight Mile (2007)
- Keroro Gunso the Super Movie 3: Keroro vs. Keroro Great Sky Duel (2008)
- Doctor-X: Surgeon Michiko Daimon (2012-2019)
- Yowamushi Pedal (2013-2018)
- M Aisubeki Hito ga Ite (2020)
- Godzilla Singular Point (2021)
- The High School Heroes (2021)
- Kotodamasou (2021)
- 7 Secretaries: The Movie (2022)
- No.1 Sentai Gozyuger (2025)
