= Doraemon: Nobita and the New Steel Troops ~Winged Angels~ =

2011 film by Yukiyo Teramoto

- Theatrical release poster

Japanese name
- Kanji: 映画ドラえもん 新・のび太と鉄人兵団 ～はばたけ 天使たち～
- Literal meaning: Doraemon: Nobita and the New Steel Troops ~Winged Angels~
Transcriptions
- Revised Hepburn: Eiga Doraemon Shin Nobita to Tetsujin Heidan ~Habatake Tenshi Tachi~
- Directed by: Yukiyo Teramoto
- Screenplay by: Yuichi Shinbo
- Based on: Doraemon's Long Stories: Nobita and the Steel Troops by Fujiko F. Fujio
- Produced by: Maiko Sumida; Momoko Kawakita; Rika Tsuruaki; Shunsuke Okura; Takumi Fujimori
- Starring: Wasabi Mizuta; Megumi Ōhara; Yumi Kakazu; Subaru Kimura; Tomokazu Seki; Chiaki Fujimoto; Miyuki Sawashiro; Yumiko Kobayashi; Kouji Katou; Masaharu Fukuyama; Kotono Mitsuishi; Yasunori Matsumoto
- Cinematography: Katsuyoshi Kishi
- Edited by: Keiki Miyake; Riko Fujimoto; Toshihiko Kojima
- Music by: Kan Sawada
- Production company: Shin-Ei Animation
- Distributed by: Toho
- Release date: March 5, 2011 (Japan)
- Running time: 108 minutes
- Country: Japan
- Language: Japanese
- Box office: $31.9 million

Doraemon: Nobita and the New Steel Troops ~Winged Angels~ (映画ドラえもん 新・のび太と鉄人兵団 ～はばたけ 天使たち～, Eiga Doraemon Shin Nobita to Tetsujin Heidan ~Habatake Tenshi Tachi~), also known as Doraemon, Nobita and the Steel Troops New Age, is a 2011 Japanese animated science fiction action-adventure film directed by Yukiyo Teramoto and based on the seventh volume of the Doraemon Long Stories series, Nobita and the Steel Troops and the 31st feature film in the Doraemon franchise. It was released in Japan on March 5, 2011.

The film serves as a remake of the 1986 Doraemon film, Doraemon: Nobita and the Steel Troops and was ranked the 5th highest earning Japanese animated film.

== Plot ==
At the playground, Suneo shows off Micross, his new radio-controlled toy robot that his cousin made. Jealous, Nobita runs back home and begs Doraemon to build him a giant robot to upstage Suneo. Doraemon refuses and they argue, causing him to storm off to the North Pole using Anywhere Door to get away from the summer heat to cool off. Sometime later, Nobita follows and discovers a strange bowling ball-like mechanical orb that can summon parts for a giant robot.

After returning home with the orb, Nobita and Doraemon decide to build the robot in an uninhabited mirror world accessed by using Doraemon's Opposite World Entrance Oil on a surface of water. There, they built the robot which Nobita christens the name "Zanda Cross" as he believed the orb summoning the parts is from Santa Claus. Zanda Cross seems to lack a brain, so Doraemon uses a psychic controller to allow them to pilot it. Meanwhile in the real world, Nobita's mother accidentally trips on the orb and locks it in a shed.

After Nobita has Zanda Cross perform gymnastic man-oeuvres in a mirror world, he brings Shizuka to play with them. When Shizuka is given the psychic controller to pilot it, she accidentally fires lasers at a skyscraper, utterly destroying it. The group becomes devastated when they realize that Zanda Cross is actually a weapon of war. Realizing what could've happened if they were in the real world, they abandon both the robot and the mirror world, and vow never to speak of them again.

However, Nobita forgot about the orb that had been sending telepathic messages to a mysterious scantily-clad girl named Lilulu, the actual owner of Zanda Cross, who came to Tokyo as long as she receives the orb's telepathic messages. Lilulu seeks out Nobita when he accidentally lets slip all that he knows about Zanda Cross, whose actual name is revealed to be Judo. Nobita reluctantly leads her to Zanda Cross's location in the mirror world and hands her the psychic controller. Lilulu offers to forgive Nobita for the theft if she can use the mirror world, but makes Nobita promise to keep this a secret.

That night, Nobita investigates the mirror world to find Lilulu leading a group of robots in building a large facility. Nobita also finds Doraemon following him due to his recent despondent behavior. Nobita reveals what happened between him and Lilulu, as well as his suspicion that she may be an alien. The two learn that the robots are preparing for an invasion of Earth so they escape back into the real world. Lilulu, who is revealed to be an android with the hatred of humanity, and Zanda Cross pursue them, but Zanda Cross is too big to fit through the portal and ends up destroying it catastrophically, trapping the robots in the mirror world.

Nobita and Doraemon rejoice believing that the Earth has been saved, but the two have completely forgotten about the orb that is still at home, before it suddenly wakes up and bounces around. Using Translation Jelly to allow the orb to speak, Doraemon and Nobita discover that the orb is in fact Judo, the mechanical brain meant to pilot Zanda Cross. Judo further reveals that he has already signalled the rest of the robot army to commence their invasion of Earth. Doraemon and Nobita try to alert the authorities, but in vain, as none of them believes their story.

With only Suneo and Gian believing him and Nobita about the robot army, Doraemon pulls out a special incubator and puts Judo with the Translation Jelly in it, reprogramming and turning Judo into a yellow cyborg chick, which nicknamed "Pippo" (one of the onomatopoeias to describe the sound a peep makes in Japanese) by Nobita due to his transformed appearance. They reenter the mirror world through Shizuka's bathtub by using Doraemon's Opposite World Entrance Oil, but leave Shizuka out of the mission due to its risky nature. Later, they are captured by the robot army, with only Judo and Nobita escaping. Nobita decides to help his friends and thus goes to the base to rescue them. At the base, they see the robot army disposing of Zanda Cross. Judo pilots Zanda Cross and creates a distraction, while Nobita rescues his friends. Meanwhile, Shizuka learns of the mirror world and enters it. She finds the damaged Lilulu and takes her to the former's mirror home. Later, Nobita, Doraemon, Suneo, and Judo rejoin with Shizuka. Shizuka uses Doraemon's machine first aid kit to repair Lilulu. This helps the gang gain Judo's trust, with Nobita becoming good friends with Judo.

Meanwhile, Lilulu had some traumatic experiences as a child: back in her home planet Mechatopia, there are two classes of robots, the ruling and the ruled classes. The ruled class is treated like slaves, and even Judo was thrown away in the garbage, only for singing. As Mechatopia progresses, the ruled class demands equality and liberation, so the robots decide to use humans as their new workforce. Eventually, the robots view themselves as the superior class compared to humans. The only individual with whom she feels connected is Judo, whom she fixed "on a whim" after he was broken by the other robots. Despite everything Nobita and the others do for her, Lilulu manages to escape and decides to alert the robot army and their leader that they are in a mirror world and not the real world. The gang locates her before the meet, and Nobita tries to stop her, but Lilulu shoots Nobita with a laser beam from her finger. Judo jumps in front of Nobita and becomes very badly injured, which gives Lilulu a wake-up call as she decides to help humanity while not disclosing the reason for the lack of people. However, the robot leader sentences Lilulu to death, but Nobita, Doraemon, and the others arrive with Zanda Cross and rescue her.

Back in the real world, Lilulu still feels conflicted, as even if she knows it is immoral to capture humans for slavery, she still cannot betray her home planet. She asks Doraemon to lock her up in a birdcage using the Small Light. The robot army continues to attack and destroy the major cities, with the expectation that they can capture humans to be sent to Mechatopia for slavery. Later, the robot army becomes suspicious because of the lack of humans in the world. They discover that they are in a mirror world after analyzing the satellite image of the mirror world and comparing the image to another image of the real world, and seeing how they are reversed. They return to the lake where they first entered the mirror world, which they believe is the connection doorway. Doraemon and the group intercept the army at the lake. Lilulu and Shizuka remain at Shizuka's house to have a conversation. Lilulu admits the robots' mistakes and asks herself if the creators of progenitor robots Amu and Imu made a mistake in creating them, which gives Shizuka a brilliant idea to save the world. She re-enlarges Lilulu, using the Enlarging Torch Light, and they both use the Walk-In Mirror to return to the real world. Using the time machine, they return to ancient Mechatopia, attempting to talk to "God", the elderly man, who appears to be the scientist who created Amu and Imu from which the robot army is descended.

The scientist plans to redo everything by removing the competition instinct from his robots, replacing those instincts with instincts of humanity and love, but he is too frail to finish the process. Lilulu, to complete the salvation, disregards the fact that she and Judo will erase from existence after they alter history, and she continues the reprogramming with instructions from God. Back on Earth in the present time, the robot army, larger in number, has taken the upper hand. Zanda Cross is heavily damaged in the process of destroying the leading ship of the robot army. Back at the ancient Mechatopia, as Lilulu has nearly finished her job, she figures out that she needs only to add her feelings, her love for Nobita and his friends, including Judo. The job is completed just in time as the robot army is reinforced and attacks en masse. The reprogramming is completed and the robot army is completely erased. Lilulu and Judo also begins disappearing and vow to reincarnate as angels to meet their friends again before they are erased completely. A heartbroken Shizuka rejoins her friends in the present and tells them about Lilulu's fate.

Some time later, Nobita is being left after school and wonders what has become of Mechatopia. Suddenly, he sees Lilulu and Judo, in his phoenix form, who visit Nobita with cheers before flies into outer space. Nobita runs out to tell the rest of his friends and exclaims that Lilulu and Judo have become angels, though they don't believe him.

== Cast ==
Character	Japanese voice actor
Doraemon	Wasabi Mizuta
Nobita Nobi	Megumi Ōhara
Shizuka Minamoto	Yumi Kakazu
Takeshi "Gian" Gōda	Subaru Kimura
Suneo Honekawa	Tomokazu Seki
Dorami	Chiaki
Lilulu	Miyuki Sawashiro
Judo/Pippo	Yumiko Kobayashi
Robot Squad Leader	Koji Kato
Miyabiaki Fukuyama	Masaharu Fukuyama
Tamako Nobi	Kotono Mitsuishi
Nobisuke Nobi	Yasunori Matsumoto
Robot Squad Vice Commander	Naoki Tatsuta
Aristocracy Robot	Junichi Sugawara
Professor	Tadashi Nakamura

== See also ==
- List of Doraemon films
