= Doraemon Wii =

2007 video game

- Developer(s): Eighting
- Publisher(s): Sega
- Designer(s): Various
- Composer(s): Masaharu Iwata; Mitsuhiro Kaneda; Kimihiro Abe; Noriyuki Kamikura; Manabu Namiki
- Platform(s): Wii
- Release: JP: December 6, 2007
- Genre(s): Party
- Mode(s): Multiplayer

Doraemon Wii - Secret Tool King Tournament, known in Japan as Doraemon Wii - Himitsu Douguou Ketteisen (ドラえもん Wii ひみつ道具王決定戦) is a party video game based on the manga and anime series Doraemon. It was released in Japan on December 6, 2007 for the Wii.

== Places ==
- District Area
- Cloud Kingdom
- Space Station
- Prehistoric Island
- Nobita's Room
- Town

== Board spaces ==
- Shop - This space sells gadgets and all gadgets costs points. Unlocked gadgets only.
- Item - Receive an item.
- Multiplayer Mini Game - All players enter a random unlocked mini-game.
- + "number" - receives mini stars if stepped
- - "number" - loses mini stars if stepped
- Happy face - Lucky event
- Sad face - Unlucky event
- Flag - Starting/Finishing space
- Board-specific objects

== Playable characters ==
- Doraemon
- Dorami
- Nobita Nobi
- Shizuka Minamoto
- Takeshi Goda
- Suneo Honekawa

== Minigames ==
There are 36 minigames in this game.

- Anki-pan - Match items by putting bread on them. ^{1}
- Spaceship - Land on the planet for points. (Earth has 100 points, the yellow planet has 70 points, the green planet has 50 points, and the black planet has 30 points) ^{1}
- Fishing - Catch some fish for points. Small fish are worth 100 points, medium fish are worth 200 points, and big fish are worth 300 points. Careful! Do not catch the shark, if you catch it, you'll lose 1000 points. ^{1}
- Come Come Cat - Shake the Wii Remote for the Mini-Doras to come in to your shop. ^{1}
- Cupid Arrow - Shoot the Mini-Doras for love to earn points. ^{1}
- Fan - Shake the Wii Remote for gaining wind to the goal. ^{1}
- Air Crayon - Draw the item using the Wii Remote. There are 10 different designs. ^{2}
- Air Pistol - Shoot the kites for points. ^{1}
- Air Cannon - Shoot the meteorites for points. ^{2}
- Gorugon Snake - Cover the Gorugon snakes using boxes for points. ^{1}
- Sakamichi Lever - Race till the goal or to the hole. ^{1}
- Toriyose Bag - Find the matching items hidden in the bag. If you pick the wrong item, you're out! ^{1}
- Trampoline Gen - Move your character to pop the balloons for points. ^{1}
- Dokusai Switch - Press the 'A' button to make opponents disappear in G-major. ^{1}
- Toorimeke Hoop - Throw a hoop on the wall. But avoid Sugoroido! ^{1}
- Take-copter - Fly in the sky to collect points. ^{1}
- Time Machine - Race to the goal by avoiding viruses. ^{1}
- Time Furoshiki - Wrap a living thing to match the correct age shown in the image at the center of the screen. ^{1}
- Time Hole and Time Mochi - Stick a matching dinosaur by following its shadow. ^{1}
- Zeikin Bird - Collect coins but avoid the bird. ^{1}
- Small Light - Shrink a giant opponent. ^{3}
- Super Gloves - 3 characters throw some rocks, one player must avoid it. If one player gets damaged, the three players win. If one player survives, the solo player wins! ^{3}
- Shock Gun - Shoot the fastest to win. ^{1}
- The Human Controller - Follow the moves of the Mini-Doras by moving the Wii Remote. ^{1}
- Bai-Bain - Eat the most buns to win. Careful! If the meter reaches the red part, you get a stomachache! ^{1}
- Hanetsu Robot - Just like tennis. ^{1}
- Hirai Manto - Avoid Sugoroido's attacks. ^{1}
- Fukugen Light - Heal the cracks of the vase. ^{1}
- Ma-A Ma-A Stopper - Calm down the teacher's anger or he will blow up and you're out! ^{1}
- Michibikienzel - Think of which way until you reach the goal. If you go that way before the angel talks to the end of a statement, you'll get slapped by the angel! ^{1}
- Mood Band - Shake the Wii Remote to make music and avoid bombs. If you get hit by the bomb, you're out of the band! ^{1}
- Mutekihoudai - 3 players will avoid the attacks of the gun by one player. ^{3}
- Momotaro Biscuit - Feed the dinosaurs. ^{1}
- Rikujou Boat - Row for the goal to win. ^{2}
- Karaoke Challenge (NEW GAME!) - Sing the ABC song with your microphone on karaoke. The vowels are 5 points and the consonants are 3 points. The total score is 88 points. Be careful! If you don't follow the letters, you won't win points! ^{1}

Note: ^{1} is the 4-player minigame, ^{2} is the 2 vs 2 minigame, and ^{3} is the 1 vs 3 minigame.
