= Doraemon (character) =

Fictional animated character created by Fujiko Fujio

- Doraemon character
- Doraemon as he appears in the 2005 Doraemon TV series
- First appearance: December 1969; Shogaku Yo-nensei (magazine); Doraemon (1973 TV series)
- Created by: Fujiko F. Fujio
- Portrayed by: Jean Reno; Bruce Willis
- Voiced by: Japanese; Kōsei Tomita (1973); Masako Nozawa (1973, 1976); Nobuyo Ōyama (1979–2005); Kazue Takahashi (1980, yellow); Chisa Yokoyama (1995, yellow); Wasabi Mizuta (2005–present); English; A.J. Henderson (1985–1996); Hossan Leong (2002–2003); Mona Marshall (2014–2021, US dub); Sarah Hauser (2015–2016, UK/Hong Kong dub)

In-universe information
- Species: Robot cat
- Gender: Male
- Affiliation: Nobi family
- Relatives: Dorami (younger sister)
- Birthday: September 3, 2112
- Hometown: Tokyo

Doraemon (Japanese: ドラえもん) is the titular character of the manga and anime series Doraemon, created by Fujiko F. Fujio. Doraemon is a male robotic cat that travels back in time from the 22nd century to aid a preteen boy named Nobita Nobi in his daily life.

Doraemon is considered to be one of the most popular manga and anime characters of all time. A birth certificate for the character gives him a birth date of 3 September 2112 and lists his city of residency as Kawasaki, Kanagawa, the city where the manga was created. In 2008, Japan's Foreign Ministry appointed Doraemon the country's "anime ambassador".

== Creation and conception ==
Doraemon was conceived by Hiroshi Fujimoto following a series of three events. Firstly, when searching for ideas for a new manga, he wished that a machine existed that would come up with ideas for him. Secondly, he tripped over his daughter's toy. Thirdly, he heard cats fighting in his neighborhood.

The name, "Doraemon", can be translated roughly to "stray". The name "Doraemon" (ドラえもん) is written in a mixture of two Japanese scripts: Katakana (ドラ) and Hiragana (えもん). "Dora" derives from "dora neko" (どら猫; stray cat), and is a corruption of nora (stray), while "-emon" (in kanji 衛門) is an old-fashioned suffix for male names (for example, as in Ishikawa Goemon)

== Characteristics ==
Doraemon's physical appearance changed as the manga progressed. At first, he was predominantly kingfish color, with a blue tail, a white stomach, and flesh-colored hands and feet. He also stooped, and had a body much larger than his head. In later issues, he sported a smaller body, white hands and feet, and a red tail — the appearance most identified with him today. His appearance differs from other robot cats, who have yellow bodies and ears, due to an event in his past: when he was sleeping, a rat snuck in and nibbled his ears off, after that he tried getting surgery to fix his ears, but it instead completely removed his ears, which got him so upset he cried until his paint job came off, leaving him with just his base coat.

A running gag features Doraemon's friendship and unrequited infatuation with Mii-chan, a cat in the area; he occasionally neglects his duties in pursuit of Mii-chan, though not so frequently as to be disruptive to his reputation. Another features Doraemon being enraged when he is mistaken for a raccoon dog due to his missing ears. As a robot, Doraemon can be programmed to complete a task by pushing a button on his nose, and can shut down if his tail is pulled. In a few episodes, Doraemon has been shown to be in danger of factory-resting, or being on the verge of breaking.

Doraemon's favourite food is dorayaki (どら焼き) (known as "fudgy pudgy pie" in the first revision of the English manga, although it has since been reverted back to "dorayaki", "yummy buns" in the English dub, and "dora-cakes/bean jam buns" in other versions), a Japanese treat filled with red bean paste. While it might explain the origin of his name, it was revealed in one of the manga chapters that his name originates from the Japanese word nora neko (のら猫) for "stray cat", and the -emon (衛門) ending which is part of traditional Japanese names, as seen also in, for example, Ishikawa Goemon.

== Appearances ==
=== Doraemon ===
In Hiroshi Fujimoto's original 1974 backstory, Doraemon was originally yellow (from paint made of eggs) and had a more high-pitched voice than his current counterpart. He was manufactured on 3 September 2112 by the Matsushiba Robot Factory (マツシバ • ロボット • 工場). He had his capabilities crippled due to an accidental electrocution. Due to his subpar performance in training, he is deemed an inferior outcast by his peers like Nobita, being able to relate to him as a result. He was eventually purchased by the poverty-stricken Nobi family, as an infant Sewashi Nobi took a liking to him in addition to his cheap price as a substandard model making him affordable. However, his ears were gnawed off by mice, with a surgery leaving him bald further hurting his pride. In a state of depression, he accidentally consumed a potion that causes him great sadness, with the resulting tears washing his yellow paint off, resulting in his current appearance. This backstory was adapted in the 1995 short film 2112: The Birth of Doraemon (as well as The Doraemons story arc set in the Robot School), though the electrocution was not shown in the former for unknown reasons. Sewashi sends Doraemon back in time to care for Nobita in order to improve his life.

=== In other media ===
French actor Jean Reno portrayed Doraemon in several live-action television commercials throughout 2011 and 2016. The advertisements were created by Toyota and depict the series' characters two decades after they had "grown up".

Doraemon appeared at the Tokyo video showcase at the 2016 Summer Olympics closing ceremony in anime form with his fellow anime characters Nobita, Shizuka, Gian, Suneo and other Japanese characters such as Captain Tsubasa, Pac-Man and Hello Kitty. He later appeared at the video where he helped prime minister Shinzō Abe (dressed up as Mario) by planting a Warp Pipe from Shibuya Crossing to Maracanã Stadium.

== Voice ==
Doraemon was voiced by Nobuyo Ōyama from 1979 to 2005. Nobuyo Ōyama retired in 2005 due to health problems, and Doraemon has been voiced by Wasabi Mizuta since 2005.

== Reception ==
In terms of popularity the character has been compared to Walt Disney's Mickey Mouse, and the character is considered to be an iconic figure in Japan.

In his book Japan Pop: Inside the World of Japanese Popular Culture, author Timothy J. Craig wrote, "Though Doraemon is himself a high-tech product, he possesses an endearing personality that captivates young audiences. He is both a full member of Nobita's family and an intimate friend to Nobita and his companions. Portrayed in this way, Doraemon represents the optimistic view of the relationship between technology and humanity."

In a survey conducted by the Oricon in 2007 among 1,000 people, Doraemon was ranked as the second strongest manga character of all time, behind Dragon Ball protagonist Son Goku.

In 2008 the character of Doraemon was appointed as an "anime ambassador" to help promote Japanese anime worldwide and in 2013 Doraemon was considered to be the most popular character among Japanese children in a survey held by Video Research Ltd, a position the character had held in the survey since June 2009. On The Wall Street Journal's Japan Real Time, Toko Sekiguchi called it "arguably the most beloved cartoon character in Japan". Google Japan utilized Doraemon in its Google Doodle for 3 September 2009, in celebration of the character's 40th birthday.

In 2012, Hong Kong celebrated the birthday of Doraemon 100 years early with a series of displays of the character.

In India, Doraemon has become one of the most popular and recognizable animated characters among children. A 2010 study by Ormax Media found Doraemon to be the top favorite character among kids aged 6–14, ranking above classic characters like Tom and Jerry. Doraemon has a massive viewership base in India, with reports estimating it reaches over 480 million viewers nationwide, including adults. In 2013, the show was awarded "Favorite Show on Kids Channel" at the Nickelodeon Kids' Choice Awards India, highlighting the character's popularity and the love it receives in the country.

Politician Osamu Fujimura is known as the "Doraemon of Nagatacho" due to his figure and warm personality. Sumo wrestler Takamisugi was nicknamed "Doraemon" because of his resemblance to the character. ESP Guitars, has also made several Doraemon shaped guitars.

During 2014, Doraemon was featured on the cover of all 51 magazines published by Shogakukan.

=== Criticism ===
The Doraemon character has received criticism in mainland Chinese media outlets where they considered Doraemon to be a politically subversive character and that it was a tool of Japan's "cultural invasion".

In 2019, a resolution was made in the Pakistan assembly to ban Doraemon claiming that it has "harmful impact on children". One of the reason cited by the lawmaker is the depiction of mixed-sex education, which he labelled as incompatible with Pakistani culture and Muslim culture.
