= Nobita Nobi =

Fictional character in Doraemon

- Doraemon character
- Nobita Nobi as he appears in the Doraemon (2005) anime series.
- First appearance: Doraemon chapter 1: "All the Way from the Future" (December 1969)
- Created by: Fujiko F. Fujio
- Voiced by: Japanese: Yoshiko Ōta (1973) Noriko Ohara (1979 – March 2005) Hiroko Maruyama (stand-in for Ohara, July 1979) Megumi Ōhara (April 2005 – present) Teen: Makiko Ōmoto (2000–2004) Mai Kadowaki (2005–2007) Adult: Kōzō Shioya (1984) Shingo Hiromori (1987–1990) Noriko Ohara (2000–2004) Tōru Ōkawa (2005–present) Hideyuki Hori (2005–present) Subaru Kimura (2006–present) Satoshi Tsumabuki (Stand by Me Doraemon films); English; Steven Bednarski (1985-1996); Denise Tan (2002-2003); Rumiko Varnes (2003); Johnny Yong Bosch (2014-present, US dub); Muriel Hoffman (UK/Hong Kong dub)

In-universe information
- Nicknames: Noby (Bang Zoom! English dub) (Doraemon: Gadget Cat from the Future); Specky (Speedy Video English dub); Sidney (Cinar English dub) (The Adventures of Albert and Sidney)
- Gender: Male
- Significant others: Shizuka Minamoto (future girlfriend and wife)
- Children: Nobisuke Nobi (future son)
- Relatives: Nobisuke Nobi (father); Tamako Nobi (mother); Sewashi Nobi (future great-great-grandson)
- Origin: Tokyo, Japan
- Nationality: Japanese
- Age: 10
- Birthday: August 7, 1960 (1969); August 7, 1964 (1973); August 7, 1969 (1979); August 7, 1995 (2005); August 7, 2004 (3D CG)

Nobita Nobi (Japanese: 野比 のび太, Hepburn: Nobi Nobita) is one of the main characters in the Doraemon manga and anime series created by Fujiko F. Fujio. Known as Sidney, Specky and Noby in some English localizations of the anime, Nobita is usually depicted as an elementary school student. The title character, Doraemon, is sent back in time by Nobita's future great-great grandson Sewashi to look after him in the present to ensure he becomes a better person and has a successful future.

Alongside Doraemon himself, Nobita is considered to be one of the most popular and widely recognizable manga characters due to the series' popularity, which extends beyond its native home country of Japan.

== Characteristics ==
Nobita's characterization depicts him as a lazy underachiever, including but not limited to a lack of physical ability, predisposition to procrastination, reluctance to engage in critical thinking and exhibiting perverted behavior. He dislikes books (excluding manga) and lacks a basic grasp of knowledge expected for his age, such as being unable to understand concepts such as the definition of an eclipse. A running gag involves his disposition to frequent and efficient napping, infamous in the community to the point he is primarily known for his napping in nearby cities.

Many chapters start with Nobita in tears, begging Doraemon to lend him a (faulty or outdated) gadget. His usual motives are to get revenge on Gian and Suneo's harassment, show off to Shizuka for her affections, act out his imagination or solve extremely trivial problems. However, he is very untrustworthy when handling gadgets, frequently abusing their power to the point he causes suffering to himself or others, in part due to his poor decisions, the gadgets' own faults or interference by other characters.

He envies his classmate Hidetoshi Dekisugi, a straight-A student who is admired by all of the girls in his class, including Shizuka, but is otherwise on good terms with him. He is friends with Shizuka, Suneo and Gian, though the latter two harass and bully him for his ineptitude or poor decisions.

Even though Nobita possesses many questionable character traits, he occasionally displays redeeming qualities such as kind-heartedness, courage, and even a good work ethic. In some full-length stories, he has risked his life to help save others, or even entire civilizations. In some episodes, it is implied that his poor academic grades are due to his lazy nature as opposed to a lack of intellectual ability. Nobita has consistently displayed sharp marksmanship, mastering light gun games and the Air Cannon with little to no difficulty. The character has also demonstrated creativity when it comes to utilising Doraemon's gadgets in novel ways. Also, occasionally, he manages to score good marks in his tests and also sometimes manages to perform well in sports.

== Appearances ==
The central premise of the Doraemon media franchise is grounded on the relationship between its protagonists, Doraemon and Nobita. Nobita was doomed to suffer from a life of misery, marrying Gian's sister and squandering the family's finances due to poor personal and business choices. After his death, his descendants in the 22nd century, including his great-great-grandson Sewashi Nobi, live in poverty. Sewashi was able to acquire Doraemon due to Doraemon being deemed substandard by his manufacturer. He sends Doraemon back to Nobita's time, after which he is able to live a substantially improved life. There is otherwise little to no continuity in the manga and anime's plots, allowing for Nobita's character development, if any, to be essentially negated.

=== In other media ===
Japanese actor Satoshi Tsumabuki appeared as Nobita in several live-action television commercials throughout 2011 and 2016. The advertisement's were created by Toyota and depict the series' characters two decades after they "grow up."

Nobita has appeared in various educational manga along with other Doraemon characters. The character has been used in a public service campaign organized by the West Japan Railway Company (JR West), where posters of Doraemon, Nobita and several supporting characters from the series were distributed to promote appropriate etiquette for train travel during the then-ongoing COVID-19 pandemic in Japan.

Cheung Sun's 18-Year-Old Nobi Nobita was one of the early commercial successes in Hong Kong internet literature. It was released on HKGolden in 2010 and published as a physical book by Fung Lam Media in 2014. The dystopian novel subverts the cartoon character's family friendly image, depicting the character as an adult with an inferiority complex and anti-social personality disorder, who murders his friends and engages in other social destruction.

== Cultural impact ==
Due to the success of the Doraemon franchise, Nobita is an internationally recognized character that has attained considerable notoriety. The character's likeness has been recreated as figurines sold during festive celebrations in parts of India. Nobita's family residence, a typical Japanese suburban house, is a recognizable element of the series to international audiences.

Nobita's relationship with Shizuka has been referenced by an Indian television personality from the Bigg Boss reality television series in a public discussion about the rivalry between his cast mates Sidharth Shukla and Rashami Desai, whereas his relationship dynamic with Doraemon had been co-opted as a satirical form of criticism against a Malaysian politician.

A footprint fossil of a dinosaur species discovered in China in 2020 is named Eubrontes nobitai after Nobita.

=== Reception ===
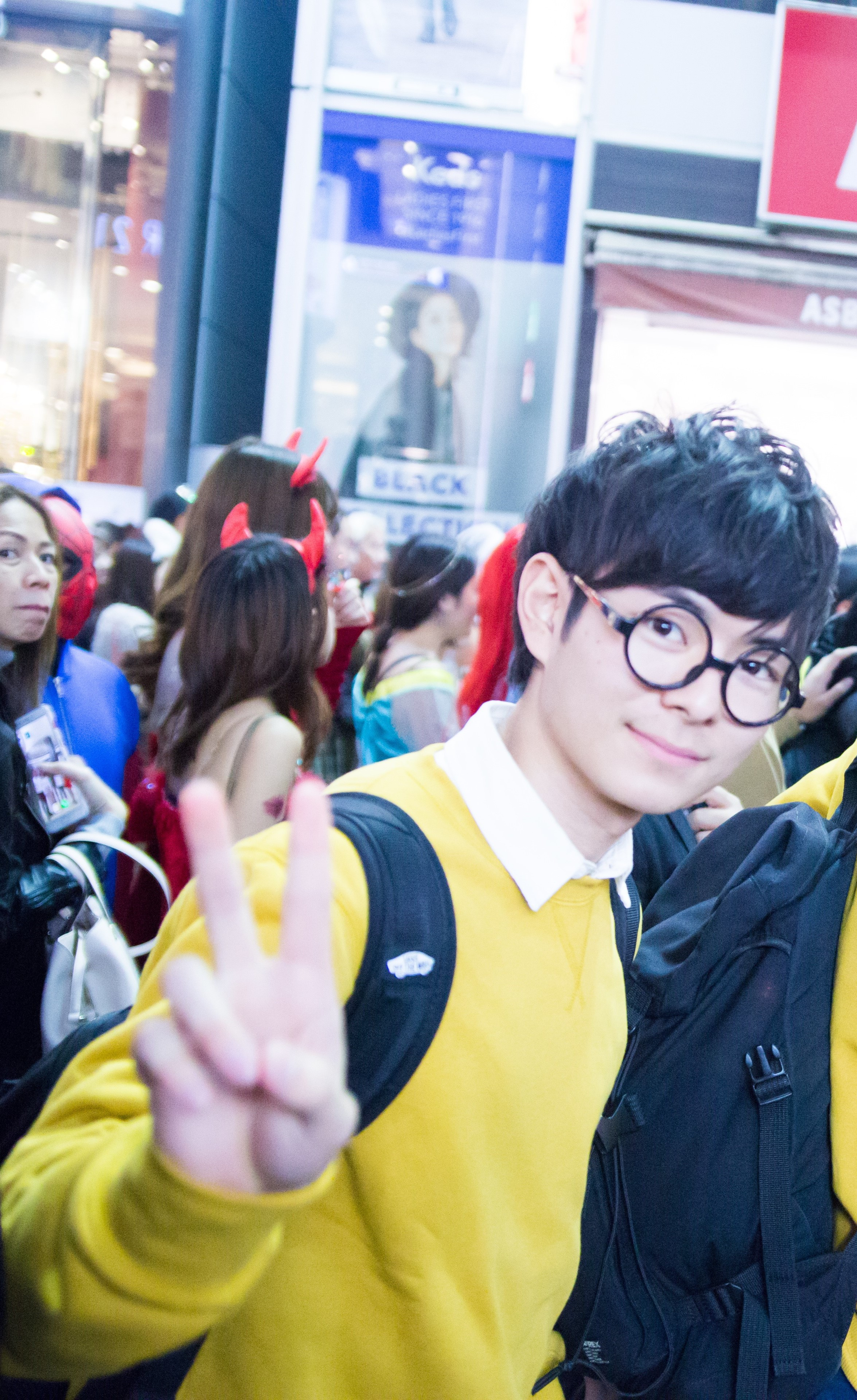
A cosplayer portraying Nobita Nobi

Critics found that the character's flawed personality and modest background is considered to be a departure from other contemporary anime and manga protagonists typically portrayed as special or extraordinary, and the consistent portrayal of Nobita as being relatable and down-to-earth had been cited as reasons behind the character's appeal as well as the contrary. Opinion of Nobita varies between countries; for example, he receives criticism in India and Pakistan for his amorality and lack of personal growth, deemed as a harmful role model to children. According to the Italian Parents Movement (Moige), in the manga, "the lazy Nobita does not know any kind of appreciable evolution", though there are still good points including "the criticism of bullying, the goodness that transpires from the little Nobita and the positive figure of Shizuka". According to an analysis by Anne Allison, professor of cultural anthropology at Duke University, the strong point of the series and its heart is the relationship between Nobita and Doraemon, as opposed to the variety of the gadgets showcased by the latter.

In early 2021, the character became a trending topic on social media following the international release of promotional material featuring the character marrying Shizuka in the animated film Stand by Me Doraemon 2.

=== Criticism ===
In August 2016, a member of the Tehreek-i-Insaf party submitted a resolution in the Punjab Assembly calling for a ban on the series, alleging the show's "negative impact" on Pakistani children: one of the cited reasons behind the motion was the depiction of mixed-sex education, which was labelled as incompatible with Pakistani culture and Muslim culture, in addition to Nobita's own undesirable character traits. Similarly, politicians and activists in neighbouring India have criticized Nobita's problematic behavioural traits for setting a bad example to children, such as answering back to their parents and refusing to do their homework. One activist blamed the character's supposed influence for a 2013 exam-fixing scandal in the state of Madhya Pradesh.
