= Shihoko Hagino =

Japanese announcer (born 1972)

- 萩野 志保子
- Born: August 24, 1972 (age 54); Shimanto City, Kōchi Prefecture, Japan
- Education: Keio University
- Occupations: Announcer; voice actress
- Years active: 1996–present
- Employer: TV Asahi
- Notable credit: Doraemon as Hidetoshi Dekisugi
- Spouse(s): Susumu Iguchi (m. 2000; div. 2007) Keio University classmate (m. 2013)
- Children: 1
- Website: Official profile

Shihoko Hagino (萩野 志保子, Hagino Shihoko; born August 24, 1972) is a Japanese announcer and voice actress.

== Biography ==
Hagino was born in Shimanto City in Kōchi Prefecture on August 24, 1972.

She graduated from Keio Girls Senior High School, and then from the Department of Japanese Literature at the Graduate School of Letters, Keio University.

In April 1996, she officially started her affiliation with TV Asahi.

She married video creator Susumu Iguchi in 2000, but they divorced in 2007.

In June 2005, it was announced on her blog that she had been cast as the new voice of the character Hidetoshi Dekisugi in the Doraemon anime, succeeding Sumiko Shirakawa. She was one of the applicants who partook in the recasting auditions for the series in 2004 and was chosen for the role of Dekisugi because of her "cool voice and laid-back charm", plus her experience as the announcer of Atashin'chi.

In 2013, she married a regular man who was a former classmate of hers at Keio University.

In February 2014, Hagino announced on her blog that she was five months pregnant with a baby. After taking a year and several months away from the entertainment industry to care for her child, she returned to work in November 2015.

== Filmography ==
=== Television programs ===
List of appearances in television programs
Year	Title	Role	Notes	Source
1996–1997	Early Morning! Weather & News CNN			
1996–1998	First News & Weather of the Early Morning			
1997–1998	Super J Channel			
1997	Saturday Jungle			
1997	Sunday Jungle			
1998	Investigating the Truth! The Rumor File			
1999–2000	Mina Nagashima's Fierce Battle! Sports M18			
1999	Yajiuma Wide			
2000–2001	Breaking News! Sports Cube			
2006–2012	Chii's Stroll	Narration		
2006	Kazuko Hosoki’s Emergency Special: "Stop Bullying and Suicide—Save Troubled Children... Parents... Teachers!!"	Narration	Television special	
2016–present	Hello! This is TV Asahi	Host		
2024	Great Gift	Opening narration	Eps 4-9	

=== Television animation ===
List of voice performances in television animation
Year	Title	Role	Notes	Source
2002–2009	Atashin'chi	Announcer		
2005–present	Doraemon	Hidetoshi Dekisugi		
2009–2010	Onei & Jun: The Adorable Twins	Narration		
2025	Atashin'chi NEXT	Announcer		

=== Theatrical animation ===
List of voice performances in theatrical animation
Year	Title	Role(s)	Notes	Source
2007	Doraemon: Nobita's New Great Adventure into the Underworld ~The Seven Magic Users~	Hidetoshi Dekisugi		
2008	Doraemon: Nobita and the Green Giant Legend	Hidetoshi Dekisugi		
2009	Doraemon: The New Record of Nobita's Spaceblazer	Hidetoshi Dekisugi		
2010	Doraemon: Nobita's Great Battle of the Mermaid King	Hidetoshi Dekisugi		
2012	Doraemon: Nobita and the Island of Miracles ~Animal Adventure~	Hidetoshi Dekisugi		
2014	Doraemon: Nobita in the New Haunts of Evil ~Peko and the Five Explorers~	Hidetoshi Dekisugi		
2014	Stand by Me Doraemon	Hidetoshi Dekisugi, Future Hidetoshi Dekisugi		
2017	Gō-chan. ~Moko and the Friends of the Forest of Chinju~	Moko's mother		
2018	Doraemon: Nobita's Treasure Island	Hidetoshi Dekisugi		
2018	Gō-chan. ~Moko and the Promise on the Ice~	Moko's mother		
2019	Doraemon: Nobita's Chronicle of the Moon Exploration	Hidetoshi Dekisugi		
2020	Doraemon: Nobita's New Dinosaur	Hidetoshi Dekisugi		
2020	Stand by Me Doraemon 2	Future Hidetoshi Dekisugi		
2022	Doraemon: Nobita's Little Star Wars 2021	Hidetoshi Dekisugi		
2023	Doraemon: Nobita's Sky Utopia	Hidetoshi Dekisugi		
2024	Doraemon: Nobita's Earth Symphony	Hidetoshi Dekisugi		
2026	Doraemon: New Nobita and the Castle of the Undersea Devil	TV Announcer		
