= Doraemon: New Nobita and the Castle of the Undersea Devil =

2026 film directed by Tetsuo Yajima

Doraemon the Movie: New Nobita and the Castle of the Undersea Devil
- Theatrical release poster

Japanese name
- Kanji: 映画ドラえもん 新・のび太の海底鬼岩城
Transcriptions
- Revised Hepburn: Eiga Doraemon Shin Nobita no Kaiteiki Ganjō
- Directed by: Tetsuo Yajima
- Screenplay by: Isao Murayama
- Based on: Doraemon's Long Stories: Nobita and the Castle of the Undersea Devil by Fujiko F. Fujio
- Starring: Wasabi Mizuta; Megumi Ohara; Yumi Kakazu; Subaru Kimura; Tomokazu Seki; Shōya Chiba; Ryō Hirohashi; Airi Taira; Takayuki Sugō
- Music by: Takayuki Hattori
- Production company: Shin-Ei Animation
- Distributed by: Toho
- Release date: February 27, 2026
- Running time: 102 minutes
- Country: Japan
- Language: Japanese
- Box office: $27,322,038

Doraemon the Movie: New Nobita and the Castle of the Undersea Devil (Japanese: 映画ドラえもん 新・のび太の海底鬼岩城, Hepburn: Eiga Doraemon Shin Nobita no Kaiteiki Ganjō) is a 2026 Japanese animated science fantasy film. It is the 45th Doraemon feature film and serves as a remake of the 1983 film Doraemon: Nobita and the Castle of the Undersea Devil. It is directed by Tetsuo Yajima from a screenplay by Isao Murayama. It was released in theaters in Japan on 27 February 2026.

== Plot ==
Disagreeing over where to go camping during summer vacation, Nobita and his friends decide to camp in the middle of the ocean at Doraemon's suggestion. Using their secret gadgets, the "Underwater Buggy" and the "Tekio Light," the five enjoy their undersea camping adventure, encountering various creatures. After discovering a sunken ship, they meet a mysterious young man named El. He turns out to be an "undersea person" who lives in the Mu Federation, which spreads under the sea. The undersea people hate people on land and cannot trust Nobita and his friends. Then they receive news that "Devil's Rock Castle...has begun to move!!" What exactly is this "Devil's Rock Castle" that the undersea people fear...? With faith in their friends, they set off on a great adventure that will determine the fate of the Earth.

== Cast ==
Character	Japanese voice actor
Doraemon	Wasabi Mizuta
Nobita Nobi	Megumi Ōhara
Shizuka Minamoto	Yumi Kakazu
Takeshi Gōda	Subaru Kimura
Suneo Honekawa	Tomokazu Seki
Eru	Shōya Chiba
Underwater Buggy	Ryō Hirohashi
Mu Federation Soldier	Airi Taira
Poseidon	Takayuki Sugō
Mu Prime Minister	Masashi Ebara
Tamako Nobi (Nobita's mother)	Kotono Mitsuishi
Nobisuke Nobi (Nobita's father)	Yasunori Matsumoto

== Production ==
=== Planning and Staffing ===
Tetsuo Yajima was selected as the director. He has been largely involved in the Doraemon (2005 TV series) and in the production of films such as Nobita's New Great Adventure into the Underworld (2007), Nobita and the New Steel Troops: Winged Angels (2011), and Nobita's Earth Symphony (2024), with the movie marking his first time directing a Doraemon film. He commented:

10,928 meters—the deepest point ever reached by mankind. Let’s venture further with Doraemon and his friends! Certainly there are creatures and sceneries waiting for us that no one has ever seen. Aren’t you excited just thinking about it? The choices and decisions they face there may trouble them at times. But hidden among those will surely be ‘unexpected answers.’ To a deep-sea world no one has ever seen before—we look forward to the day we can experience it together on the screen.

The screenplay was written by Isao Murayama, making his first appearance in the film series. Since 2023, Murayama has written the scripts for several episodes of the Doraemon television anime series.

== Release ==
It was released in theaters in Japan on 27 February 2026. It was the first film in series to release in 4DX.

== Reception ==
=== Box office ===
Doraemon: New Nobita and the Castle of the Undersea Devil It has grossed $25,880,020 so far and was number one at the Japanese box office for the first six weeks.

In India,it became the second highest grossing anime film.

== See also ==
- List of Doraemon films
