= List of Doraemon characters =

List of fictional characters

This list describes characters from the anime and manga series Doraemon.

== Main characters ==
=== Shizuka Minamoto ===
Shizuka Minamoto
- Shizuka Minamoto as depicted in the 2005 series
- First appearance: December 1969; Doraemon (1973 TV series)
- Created by: Fujiko Fujio
- Voiced by: Japanese: Masako Ebisu (1973); Michiko Nomura (1979–2005), Rei Sakuma (2000; Young); Yumi Kakazu (2005–present); English: Denise Tan (2002–2003); Rumiko Varnes (2003); Cassandra Lee Morris (2014-present)

In-universe information
- Aliases: Lucy (Cinar English dub); Joanne (Speedy English dub); Sue (Bang Zoom! English dub)
- Nickname: Shizuka-chan (Japanese)
- Gender: Female
- Relatives: Nobita Nobi (future husband); Yoshio Minamoto (father); Michiko Minamoto (mother)
- Nationality: Japanese
- Age: 10
- Birthday: May 8, 1962 (1969); May 8, 1965 (1973); May 8, 1974 (1979); May 8, 2000 (2005)
- Hometown: Tokyo

Shizuka Minamoto (源 静香, Minamoto Shizuka), nicknamed Shizuka-chan (しずかちゃん) is a smart, kind and pretty girl. She is often represented by the colour pink, and is seen wearing a pink shirt and skirt. The word 'Shizuka (しずか)' means 'Quiet'. She is Nobita's best friend and love-interest. She does not shun Nobita due to his failing grades, lazy disposition or constant failures. In fact, she often tries to encourage him to do better, though she usually fails to convince him. Shizuka likes to bathe several times a day; however, a running gag in the series is that she is sometimes interrupted by a sudden appearance of Nobita (sometimes Doraemon, Gian, or Suneo) usually due to misuse of Doraemon's gadgets like the Anywhere Door (Doko Demo Doa in Japanese). Shizuka's skirt is also frequently seen getting flipped, either by Nobita misusing Doraemon's gadgets, or by the wind. Scenes in which her underwear is seen, or she is seen bathing, were removed from dubbed versions, especially in India, Europe, the United States and the United Kingdom. Her true passions are sweet potatoes, which she would rather keep to herself, and the violin, for which her playing is just as horrendous as Gian's singing. She is also known for taking piano lessons reluctantly due to her mother's wishes (as she loves the violin more), which is sometimes a reason to decline hanging out with friends. Shizuka is an animal lover and has two pets at home: a dog, who was saved from succumbing to an illness by Nobita and Doraemon in one story; and a canary which often runs away on multiple occasions, causing Shizuka and Nobita to run around the city and chase it down.

She sometimes fancies handsome idols on TV. Besides Nobita, Shizuka is also close to her classmate and popular student Dekisugi, though they consider each other only friends.

=== Takeshi "Gian" Gōda ===
Takeshi "Gian" Gōda
- Gian Gōda as he is depicted in the 1979 series
- First appearance: December 1969; Doraemon (1973 TV series)
- Created by: Fujiko Fujio
- Voiced by: Japanese: Kaneta Kimotsuki (1973); Kazuya Tatekabe (1979–2005); Subaru Kimura (2005–present); Kujira (2000; Young); English: Gerald Chew (2002–2003); Kaiji Tang (2014-present)

In-universe information
- Nicknames: Gian (Japanese); Big G (Bang Zoom! English dub); Damulag (Tagalog dub)
- Gender: Male
- Relatives: Jaiko Gōda (sister); Mr. Gōda (father); Mrs. Gōda (mother)
- Nationality: Japanese
- Age: 10
- Birthday: June 15, 1959 (1969); June 15, 1962 (1973); June 15, 1971 (1979); June 15, 1997 (2005)
- Hometown: Tokyo

Takeshi Gōda (剛田 武, Gōda Takeshi) usually known by the nickname "Gian" (「ジャイアン」, "Jaian"; English: Big G) is a strong and quick-tempered local bully. He frequently steals other children's stuff (especially Nobita's and Suneo's) under the pretext of "borrowing" them, unless the toy is damaged. He is known for his awful singing voice, though he considers himself a great singer. To prove this, Gian sometimes "invites" others to attend his concerts, under the threat of beatings. His singing is so horrible that it causes nausea in listeners; once when Nobita and Doraemon tried to mute it in a silent world, Gian's writing of the lyrics on a board had the same nausea-causing effect. Though his voice is terrible, in one of the episodes it was shown that a girl liked his singing. In some films, his singing is enhanced to become an effective weapon (as in 'Nobita's Great Adventure in the South Seas'). In some episodes when his voice is recorded and he hears the recording, he instantly denies it is his voice and threatens to beat up the person who sang his songs badly. Gian is also confident in cooking, but just like his singing, his hand-made food can be a nightmare for other people very easily. At one point in one of the anime adaptions, his pizza creation was liked by a race of aliens.

However, Gian does not hesitate to help his friends when they are in real trouble. Throughout the series, particularly the films, he is often the one who voices the most concern and refuses to look away when there is a problem, in contrast to Suneo's cowardice. While he is described by others as daunting and intimidating, he is very sensitive and prone to crying when something touching happens, and he actually values his friends highly, a feeling which his friends sometimes reciprocate. Gian also has a soft spot for his younger sister, Jaiko, and usually tries to prevent her from getting into trouble, even if she can handle the situation herself. Gian is basically a bullying 'tsundere'. Despite his reputation as an overreactive bully, Gian is greatly fearful towards his mother, who often drags him out to punish his delinquency. He also acts fearful towards his mother and occasionally his teacher

His catchphrase is "What's mine is mine. What's yours is also mine." (「俺の物は、俺のもの。お前の物も俺の物。」, "Ore no mono wa, ore no mono. Omae no mono mo ore no mono."), also known as Gianism (ジャイアニズム, Jaianizumu) in Japan (the Japanese band Nightmare have borrowed the term for their albums Gianism Best Ofs and Gianizm).

=== Suneo Honekawa ===
Suneo Honekawa
- Suneo Honekawa as depicted in the 2005 series
- First appearance: December 1969; Doraemon (1973 TV series)
- Created by: Fujiko Fujio
- Voiced by: Japanese: Shun Yashiro (1973); Kaneta Kimotsuki (1979–2005); Naoki Tatsuta (stand-in for Kimotsuki) (November–December 1985); Tomokazu Seki (2005–present); English: Hossan Leong (2002–2003); Brian Beacock (2014–present)

In-universe information
- Nickname: Sneech (Bang Zoom! English dub)
- Gender: Male
- Relatives: Sunetsugu Honekawa (brother); Mr. Honekawa (father); Mrs. Honekawa (mother)
- Nationality: Japanese
- Age: 10
- Birthday: March 1, 1960 (1969); March 1, 1963 (1973); March 1, 1972 (1979); March 1, 1998 (2005)
- Hometown: Tokyo

Suneo Honekawa (骨川 スネ夫, Honekawa Suneo, English dub: Sneech) is the fox-faced (inherited from his mother) rich and spoiled child who loves to flaunt his material wealth before everyone, especially Nobita. A lot of the stories start with Suneo showing off some new video game, toy or pet which evokes Nobita's envy. He is often seen with Gian, teasing Nobita. He also often pushes Nobita aside with silly excuses while he invites Gian and Shizuka to his parties or resorts. However, he is actually one of Nobita's closest friends, who would often ask for his and Doraemon's help. In the films, Suneo is often the one most reluctant to take part in Nobita and Doraemon's adventures, and he also tries to face as little trouble as possible and go home, unless others convince him, making him somewhat a coward. He has an extensive knowledge of science, and is a talented artist and designer, besides being extremely cunning.

In some scenes, Suneo is seen as a narcissist who loves to stare at himself in the mirror while telling himself that he is the most handsome guy in the world. His habit of bragging often lands him into trouble. Suneo is also very self-conscious about his height, being the shortest kid in his class. He likes steak and melon. Suneo often tries to win Shizuka's favor and is a close friend of Gian.

== Supporting characters ==
=== Tamako Nobi ===
Voiced by: Noriko Ohara (1973), Sachiko Chijimatsu (1979–2005), Kotono Mitsuishi (2005–present) (Japanese); Rumiko Varnes (2003), Mari Devon (2014–2020), Dorah Fine (2021–present) (English)
Young Voiced by: Tomoko Kawakami

Tamako Nobi (野比 玉子, Nobi Tamako; English dub: Tammy Nobi) (née Kataoka) in the English dub, is Nobita's bespectacled, stay-at-home mother, and the one Nobita inherits his appearance from. She can be extremely strict and she is often seen scolding Nobita for his actions, such as failing the exam, playing all day instead of studying, being lazy all day, or doing something stupid (whether intentional or not). In several episodes, Nobita tries to avoid his mother's scolding by using Doraemon's gadgets. Despite her disappointment with Nobita's lazy attitude and academic failures (even when her house is occasionally visited by Nobita's teacher for his progress in school), she is actually a good mother and cares about her son deeply. Her maiden last name was revealed to be Kataoka (片岡). Her anxiety about the high household expenses is a recurring feature. In a couple of episodes where Nobita sees her in the past, it is revealed that she was rebellious even as a girl. She dislikes animals and would always reject requests for any pet Nobita wants; making this plot point in some of the films and stories where Nobita has to take in stray animals secretly. However, in one story, her initial dislike of a cat turns her into adoring it so much that she becomes depressed when the cat's owner wants it back.

=== Nobisuke Nobi ===
Adult: Voiced by: Ichiro Murakoshi (1973), Masayuki Katō (1979–1992), Yōsuke Naka (1992–2005), Yasunori Matsumoto (2005–present) (Japanese); Tony Oliver (2014–present) (English)
Young: Voiced by: Eiko Yamada (1979), Yumiko Kobayashi (2005) (Japanese)

Nobisuke Nobi (野比 のび助, Nobi Nobisuke, English dub: Toby Nobi) is Nobita's father and laid-back salaryman. He appears an easy-going father, often seen arriving home from work to soothe Tamako's anger towards Nobita. He has trouble quitting smoking and is self-conscious about his inability to pass the driving test. He also has a poor memory. He likes to drink, and sometimes arrives home drunk from nightly business meetings. Nobisuke often goes to golf which most fellow Japanese businessmen and employees play. He had many similar personality traits with Nobita when he was young like getting bad grades, being poor at athletics, and getting scolded by his father. He has an impressive talent for painting, but did not choose to be an artist due to many reasons. Nobisuke is fond of Nobita and probably does not rebuke him like Tamako does because most of Nobita's inabilities and weaknesses remind him of his own childhood faults. Though he would makes comments or conversations that affect Nobita considerably in one way or another. It was shown that he met Tamako on the day he had rejected an offer to be an artist from a wealthy gentleman, and feeling overjoyed, was running down the street at such speed that he barged straight into her, causing her to drop her ID card. This, he later returns and the acquaintance gradually turns into love and marriage.

=== Dorami ===
Dorami ドラミ
- Dorami as depicted in the 2005 Doraemon anime series
- Created by: Fujiko Fujio
- Voiced by: Japanese: Keiko Yokozawa (1980–2005); Chiaki (2006–present); English: Wendee Lee (2014-present)

In-universe information
- Gender: Female
- Relatives: Doraemon (brother)
- Nationality: Japanese
- Birthday: December 2, 2114
- Childcare: Sewashi Nobi (all manga) • Sewashi's son (later childcare) • Sewashi's son's half-cousin (3rd care) due to a long age

Dorami (ドラミ) is Doraemon's younger sister. Like Doraemon before he developed a fear of mice, she is yellow-skinned, and to keep Doraemon from thinking about his ears, her ears were replaced by a large red bow, her kitsune tails were replaced by a flower tail. She and Doraemon are siblings due to the fact that they shared half of the oil from a can when she was made. Dorami lives in the 22nd-century Tokyo with Sewashi. She sometimes visits Nobita with the time machine on Nobita's desk when Doraemon is "off-duty", to help Doraemon with something or to take care of Nobita when Doraemon has gone for his yearly health checkup. Dorami likes melonpan and is afraid of cockroaches like Nobita's mom. She is also shown to be a more advanced robot than Doraemon (Dorami is able to produce 10,000 horse power, in comparison to Doraemon's 129.3). Different from her malfunctioning brother, she is the smartest student during her school time, and has better skills in using gadgets. In one story, Nobita is intent on replacing Doraemon with Dorami due to her better skills; however, he quickly learns the fact that Dorami does not understand him as much as Doraemon does and will not tolerate his usual antics. Dorami also has her own spin-off manga.

In the manga series The Doraemons, she is the love interest of Dora-the-Kid, Doraemon's friendly rival and the one most similar to him.

=== Hidetoshi Dekisugi ===
Young: Voiced by: Sumiko Shirakawa (1980–2005), Shihoko Hagino (2005–present) (Japanese); Spike Spencer (2014–present) (English)
Adult: Voiced by: Shinya Ōtaki

Hidetoshi Dekisugi (出木杉 英才, Dekisugi Hidetoshi; English: Ace Goody) is Nobita's classmate and friendly rival as he is a good friend of Shizuka's. He is very intelligent and has photographic memory. Dekisugi is the perfect all-round student, consistently getting 100s in class (A+'s in English Dub) and also being highly capable in sports. His family is apparently wealthy, owning a house that is so large that one can lose one's way. His name literally means "brilliant over-achiever", and his last name is a pun on dekisugiru (出来過ぎる), which means "over achieving". Shizuka sometimes prefers the company of Dekisugi, who is more of her intellectual equal. Nobita often feels jealous and concocts bizarre schemes (helped by Doraemon's gadgets) to keep them apart or to win Shizuka's attention. However, Dekisugi never gets angry at Nobita and even willingly helps Nobita whenever he has philosophical or scientific questions. Dekisugi is polite, respectful, and will never argue with or fault anyone even in the most ridiculous of situations – instead he will always say something positive to lighten the mood.

In the future, it is shown that in spite of Shizuka's friendship with Dekisugi, she still marries Nobita while Dekisugi himself is wed to another woman and becomes an astronaut. The Dekisugi family becomes a very close associate of the Nobi family with the families' children being friends with each other.

=== Sewashi ===
Voiced by: Keiko Yamamoto (1973), Yoshiko Ōta (1980–2005), Sachi Matsumoto (2005–present) (Japanese); Max Mittelman (2014–present) (English)

Sewashi (セワシ, Sewashi; English dub: Soby) is Nobita's great-great-grandson, he is the one who sends Doraemon back to the past to look after Nobita. Sewashi first bought Doraemon in 2112 when Doraemon still had ears and his original factory paint. He sent him because his pocket money was not much due to the debts the family inherited from Nobita, and he also wanted to help out his troubled great-great-grandfather for themselves to lead a better life. He seems to have more common sense and is smarter than Nobita, but is just as reluctant when it comes to studying. Sewashi is also the owner of Doraemon's sister, Dorami.

=== Mrs. Honekawa ===
Voiced by: Toshiya Ueda→Kazue Takahashi (1973), Yoshino Ōtori (1979–1991), Mari Yokoo (1991–2005), Minami Takayama (2005–present) (Japanese); Dorothy Elias-Fahn (2014) (English)

Mrs. Honekawa (スネ夫の母, Suneo no Haha) is Suneo's mother. She sports curly hair and shares a fox-like face with her son and husband. She loves Suneo very much and spoils him badly. She is generous to Suneo's friends, but just like her son, she likes to show off her jewellery or branded handbags and sometimes makes Nobita's mother jealous. In the episode "Mother Vs. Rich Mother Battle," she became Tamako's rival after eating the Rival-Making steak and competes with Tamako to see who makes the tastiest curry. In the 30 years special, she is seen as just as odd and mischievous as her son. She and her husband love to travel. She has a fear of dinosaurs.

=== Sunekichi Honekawa ===
Voiced by: Issei Futamata (1984–2005), Takumi Yamazaki (2005–present) (Japanese); Derek Stephen Prince (2014) (English)

Sunekichi Honekawa (スネ吉) is Suneo's college aged cousin. He is an expert in radio-controlled toys and he often takes Suneo alone or with friends (except for Nobita) on picnics and hikes.

In the closed captioning of the English dub episode Vacuum Cleaner Super Car, his original Japanese name Sunekichi appears after the transformation of a driving school, which might be an error.

=== Michiko Minamoto ===
Voiced by: Unknown (1973), Keiko Yokozawa (1979–1981), Masako Matsubara (1981–2005), Ai Orikasa (2005–present) (Japanese); Wendee Lee (2015) (English)

Michiko Minamoto (源美智子, Minamoto Michiko) is Shizuka's mother. She is very kind, but can also be quite exigent on Shizuka sometimes. She wants Shizuka to take up piano lessons when the latter would rather want to practice violin.

=== Mrs. Gōda ===
Voiced by: Kazuyo Aoki (1979–2005), Miyako Takeuchi (2005–present) (Japanese); Jessica Gee (2014) (English)

Mrs. Gōda (ジャイアンの母, Jaian no Haha) is the owner of a small but successful store "Gōda Greengrocers" ("Gōda's Goods" in the English anime) as well as the only character Gian is deathly afraid of.

In the 1973 anime, Mrs. Gōda was dead.

In later anime projects, she is alive. Gian always tries to run away from her when she orders him to help in the matters of the store or do deliveries. Though being as strong as her son, she is a righteous person as she punishes her son whenever he bullies children as she doesn't want to let Gian hurt other children. Her harsh treatment towards Gian is driven by her love, and Gian too, though sometimes speaking ill of her, cares for his mother deeply. This is evident from the way Gian had painstakingly made a rice-cake, actually a gadget from Doraemon, which had healed his mother's health problem, despite being constantly mocked and annoyed during the process by Nobita and Suneo. Had he lost focus, the gadget would have lost effectiveness, but his love for his mother prevented him from losing concentration.

=== Jaiko Gōda ===
Voiced by: Yoshiko Ōta (1979), Kazuyo Aoki (1980–2005), Vanilla Yamazaki (2005–2010, 2013–present), Fushigi Yamada (February–June 2012) (Japanese); Minae Noji (2014–present) (English)

Jaiko Gōda (剛田 ジャイ子, Gōda Jaiko; English: Little G) is Gian's younger sister, and also the only child Gian treats well in the whole story, and Jaiko too loves her elder brother. In earlier stories, she had bad tempers when something did not go as she pleases, though she mellows down in later stories. Had Doraemon not intervened, she would have been Nobita's wife in the future which is why her first appearance is earlier than Suneo and Gian in the series. However, Doraemon succeeds on his mission and Nobita eventually marries Shizuka. Her name Jaiko is usually considered a nickname in the same vein as her brother; her given name is never revealed in the series.

As an aspiring manga artist, Jaiko goes by her pen name Christine Gōda (クリスチーネ 剛田, Kurisuchīne Gōda), and sometimes submits her manga to publishing companies for prizes. She usually fails because her storytelling is still rough, although she has received much attention from editors. Sometimes when she almost decides to give up writing comic books after failing to get good ideas, Gian and his friends, after being requested and sometimes forced, cheer her up. Unlike Gian, she is kind, polite and good at studies. She and Moteo Mote are good friends. He appreciates her cartoons and encourages her to write more.

=== Muku ===
Voiced by: Tessho Genda (1981), Kazuyo Aoki (????) → Kazuya Tatekabe (????–2005), Yasuhiro Takato (2007–present) (Japanese); Anthony Hansen (2013) (English)

Muku (ムク) / Pork Chop is Gian and Jaiko's cowardly and dimwitted pet dog, who was a little stray dog when he was adopted by the Godas. Muku tries to be as brave as Gian, who praises his strength and courage, but in many emergencies, he just runs away and enrages Gian. Initially Gian tried to get rid of him, but after he saved Gian, he has warmed up to him and become really friendly. Jaiko loves Muku very much and takes him on walks regularly. Muku occasionally shows the bad habit of gathering things from the locality in his kennel, much to Gian's embarrassment and his mother's displeasure.

=== Sensei ===
Voiced by: Osamu Katō → Masashi Amenomori (1973), Kazuya Tatekabe → Masayuki Katō → Ritsuo Sawa → Osamu Katō → Masahiko Murase → Akira Shimada (1979) → Kazuhiko Inoue (1979–1981) → Ryōichi Tanaka (1981–2005), Wataru Takagi (2005–present) (Japanese); Keith Silverstein (2014-present) (English)

Sensei (先生, Sensei; English dub: Mr. S) is a strict unnamed teacher at Nobita's school who often scolds Nobita for either not completing his homework, arriving late at school, forgetting his homework, falling asleep during class, or getting worse marks on his tests. He sometimes tries to encourage Nobita through kindness to study and not get 0 marks, and sometimes resorts to punishments that range from making Nobita stay in the hallway or clean the classroom windows alone after school. While the teacher is impressed by Dekisugi's progress and occasionally scolds Gian, Suneo tends to fool the teacher with conning lies or superstitions. The teacher often pays unexpected visits to his students' houses like Nobita's house in order to inform his parents about his recent exam results and academic position. Nobita's feelings towards him ranges from fear to respect and admiration depending on the situation. He tends to be quite grumpy and stern; his personality blinds him to his students' problems. When the teacher encounters them on the street, he advises them to do their homework and study hard. He bears a facial resemblance to Kim Jong-un,

His real name is unknown. In the Nippon TV anime, his name is given as "Ganari" (我成). In the TV Asahi version, he was once named Eiichirou Senjou (先生 えいいちろう, Senjō Eiichirō), whose family name happens to mean "teacher" but is read differently. In the English dub, he is called Mr S.

=== Mr. Kaminari ===
Voiced by: Banjō Ginga → Ken Ogata (1981) → Shingo Kanemoto (1985–1990) → Takeshi Watabe (1991–2005), Katsuhisa Hōki (2005–present) (Japanese) (Japanese); Unknown VA (US) (English)
Mr. Kaminari (神成, Kaminari; English dub: Mr. Rumbleton) is an old man living next to the Open Plot where Nobita and his friends play. It is often seen that the baseballs and footballs are breaking the glass of Kaminari's window (a woman's window in early manga chapters) or destroying one of his favorite bonsai plants, which angers Kaminari a lot. The children always try not to anger Kaminari and play carefully. Recovering the ball without getting shouted at is too difficult. Gian and Suneo quite often break his glass and make Nobita the scapegoat to recover the ball. He also has a wife who rarely appears and a beautiful granddaughter, Mizue, that Nobita and other boys has a crush on.

=== Mii-chan ===
Voiced by: Unknown (1973), Unknown → Mari Mashiba → Junko Asami → Kumiko Watanabe → Midori Nakazawa → Motoko Kumai → Fujiko Takimoto → Sachi Matsumoto (1981–2005), Mari Maruta (2005–present)

Mii-chan (ミイちゃん, Mii-chan; English dub: Mimi) is a regular female cat from Nobita's timeline, who either hangs out or goes on dates with Doraemon. She to Doraemon is similar with Shizuka to Nobita, however, besides Noramyako, Doraemon loves her very much though still often develops crushes on other cats throughout the series.

In the close captioning for the English dub episode Invasion of the Body Swappers, Mimi's name is spelled Meenie by mistake.

=== Mini-Dora ===
Voiced by: Chie Kitagawa (1989–1990) → Rei Sakuma (1993–2005), Unknown (2112: The Birth of Doraemon), Tomato Akai (2005–2009) → Hisako Kanemoto (2017–present) (Japanese); Cristina Vee (2014) (English)

Mini-Dora (ミニドラ, Minidora; English dub: Mini-dora) is a miniature version of the titular character that is a 22nd century gadget.

They are created through being grown from plants according to Doraemon: Nobita's Secret Gadget Museum and according to the 2112: The Birth of Doraemon short film, started production as a commemoration of Doraemon helping the Time Patrol successfully capture the notorious future criminal Dolmanstein and his crew.

They come in all kinds of different colors from red, blue, purple, yellow, etc and speak in their own "Minidora" language. The red one is sometimes seen hanging out with Doraemon's sister Dorami in particular after the events of the Dorami-chan short film Mini-Dora SOS!!!, of which the red one also is the focus of as they were accidentally shipped over to the future thanks to Nobita and ended up in the possession of Nobita, Gian, and Suneo's future children, with Dorami having to get them back.

There have been occasions where Doraemon has had one or more Mini-Dora help aid Nobita whenever he is unavailable. Similar to Doraemon, they share his fondness for dorayaki, and get agitated if mistaken for a tanuki.

== Minor characters ==
Nobirō Nobi
Voiced by: Yasuo Muramatsu (1980–2004), Kōichi Hashimoto (2006–present), Hidenari Ugaki (2009–2011) (Japanese); Keith Silverstein (2013) (English)
Nobirou Nobi (野比 のび郎, Nobi Nobirō; English dub: Chester Nobi) is Nobisuke's younger brother and an uncle of Nobita, with whom he is very friendly. He works overseas and only comes home during the Christmas-New Year holiday, which Nobita happily awaits every year since his uncle always gives him (and Doraemon) pocket money and presents on that time. He has a noticeably tanned skin due to his frequent stays in the tropics. In one chapter, he recounts on his many animal encounters, including an elephant which he thought had perished during World War II. The elephant is actually saved by Nobita and Doraemon due to a case of predestination paradox.
Nobie Nobi
Voiced by: Megumi Hayashibara
Nobie Nobi (野比 のび恵, Nobi Nobie) is Nobirō's daughter and Nobita's younger cousin. She is fond of Nobita and plays with him whenever she comes over to visit his house.
Tamao Kataoka
Voiced by: Toshiharu Sakurai (2005–present)
Tamao Kataoka (片岡 玉夫, Kataoka Tamao) is Tamako's younger brother and Nobita's uncle. He is a cowardly car salesman, and his cowardliness prevented him from expressing his feelings to the woman he loves. Nobita and Doraemon, despite initially deteriorating matters, finally help him to propose to (and be accepted by) the lady.
Nobiru Nobi
Nobiru Nobi (野比 のびる, Nobi Nobiru) is Nobirō and Nobisuke's father and Nobita's paternal grandfather who died before Nobita's birth. He was very strict and very rude to Nobisuke since he valued physical strength and athleticism which Nobisuke lacked, though after all he loved him very much. He did not apparently favour Nobisuke's artistic prowess, but he really treasured the portrait his son had made of him, and for which Nobisuke got first prize in school. His grandson only saw him when he traveled to the past. Despite being harsh to Nobisuke, he enjoys indulging Nobita when Nobita travels to the past.
Nobita's Grandmother
Voiced by: Miyoko Asō (1973), Atsuko Mine (May–September 1979) → Akiko Takamura (1984–2004), Yasuko Hatori (2006–present), Mari Maruta (June 2006, Young), Miki Ito (Doraemon: Nobita and the Island of Miracles ~Animal Adventure~, Young), Nobuko Miyamoto (Stand by Me Doraemon 2)

Nobisuke's mother and Nobita's paternal grandmother who is only referred to as Grandma (おばあちゃん, Obāchan) by Nobita. She died when Nobita was in kindergarten before the main storyline. She is always seen as a kind woman, if a bit eccentric, and unlike her husband, never scolded Nobisuke for his lack of interest in "masculine activities", such as getting into a fight. Nobita remembers her very fondly, with most of his better childhood memories being playing with her; many of his toys, including his old kendama, which becomes a plot point in one film, were given to him by his grandmother. When Nobita travels to the past, she always recognizes him as her grandson even if he is grown up. She takes care of Nobita on his former days and in one of The Doraemons manga, she was proud to see Nobita grown up as a teenage boy.

Nobisuke Nobi Jr.
Voiced by: Noriko Ohara (1979–1989), Yoshiko Kamei (2005–present)
Nobisuke Nobi Jr. (野比ノビスケ, Nobi Nobisuke) is Nobita and Shizuka's son, named after Nobita's father. Though being as dumb as his father, he is a strong child and a good athlete, and brave enough to bully Gian and Suneo's sons (possibly as retaliation for all of his father's suffering from their dads). The first time he met the present Nobita, he even beat up Nobita because he regarded him as an imposter. His wife's name is Yukari. His son, grandson, granddaughter-in-law are not named. He is the great-grandfather of Sewashi. His daughter-in-law is not shown in anime or manga or other media.
Yoshio Minamoto
Voiced by: Shinichi Kimotsuki (1973), Unknown (1979) → Masayuki Katō (1979–1980) → Masaru Ikeda (1981), Akira Kume (Nobita's the Night Before a Wedding), Aruno Tahara (2005–present), (Japanese); Steven Blum (in Stand by Me Doraemon) (English)
Yoshio Minamoto (源 義雄, Minamoto Yoshio) is Shizuka's father, a normal salaryman who often goes to movies with Shizuka. His best-known appearance in the series is when Nobita and Doraemon eavesdrop on him talking to Shizuka the night before Nobita and her wedding, in which he trusts that Nobita will be able to take care of Shizuka. So he accepts Nobita as his daughter's spouse. He is the only parent of Nobita's friends who is named.
Peeko
Peeko (ピー子, Pīko; English dub: Sunny) / Sunny is Shizuka's lovely pet canary. It is yellow in color and sings sweetly. Peeko (Pii-chan) escapes from the cage very often as a way of freedom. Rescuing Peeko is the plot of many episodes.
Pero
Shizuka's pet dog. He was saved by Nobita and Doraemon from succumbing from a fever.
Kazu
Shizuka's cousin. He appeared in few episodes.
Mr. Honekawa
Voiced by: Sanji Hase → Osamu Katō (1973), Osamu Katō (1979–2005), Kaneta Kimotsuki (Stand-in for Katō, May 1989–January 1990), Hideyuki Tanaka (2005–present)
Mr. Honekawa (スネ夫の父, Suneo no Chichi) is a successful businessman. He has many relationships with business elites as a part of Suneo's showing off. He appears less frequently than his wife, mostly when going tours with family or inviting Suneo's friends to his party. In the 30 years special, he is said to be mischievous as well.
Sunetsugu Honekawa
Voiced by: Naoki Tatsuta (1985), Yuki Kaida (2006–present)
Sunetsugu Honekawa (骨川 スネツグ, Honekawa Sunetsugu) is Suneo's younger brother who lives in New York City with his uncle (who is single and raised him like a son). He has a good personality and a great respect for his older brother, but only because of Suneo's arrogant brags and lies in their correspondence. He often whispers to Suneo about Hana. Regarding her as a sweet lovely girl.
Suneo's Great-Grandmother
Voiced by: Junko Hori (1997), Ako Mayama (2012)
Suneo's great-grandmother uses old wives' tales to impart values and good habits to Suneo, much to his displeasure.
Chiruchiru
Voiced by: Ikue Ōtani (October 1995), Ayumi Sena (2007–present)
Chiruchiru (チルチル; English dub: Lizzie) is Suneo's pet cat. He/She is a Persian cat often praised very much by Suneo's mother. His/Her face is also like the rest of Honekawa family.
Suneo's Uncle
He lives with Sunetsugu in New York city. He raised Sunetsugu alone like his own son. He is single. He sometimes appears in Doraemon episodes. He is Mr. Honekawa's younger brother.
Mr. Gōda
Voiced by: Masayuki Tatekabe (1973), Masayuki Katō (1979–1980), Yu Shimaka (1987), Daisuke Gōri (November 1987), Yū Shimaka (1993), Shinpachi Tsuji (2005–present) (Japanese); Kirk Thornton (2014) (English)
Mr. Gōda (ジャイアンの父, Jaian no Chichi) mostly works outside to help his wife's store. Though being the parent who is the least recurring in Fujiko's story, he is known to be the strongest man in the town that that this show takes place in. He is somewhat like Gian and would often flaunt his strength with others including Nobisuke Nobi who is just as weak as his son. He has mixed feelings for Gian where he would like and care him and occasionally would scold him for doing bad deeds like when Gian was busted for cheating on a test.
Gian's Uncle
Gian's maternal uncle. He is a black belt in judo and uses this ability to help other people. He taught Gian to use his strength in helping the weak. He also began teaching his nephew judo and he appeared in an episode
Tsubasa Ito
Voiced by: Haruna Ikezawa (1979), Masayo Kurata (2005–present) (Japanese); Mela Lee (2013) (English)
Tsubasa Ito (伊藤翼, Ito Tsubasa; English dub: Sera Ivy) is a popstar and TV actress who is very popular. Suneo often gets her autograph and shows it off to his friends. Doraemon is apparently a huge fan of her since it is shown in one episode that he has pictures of her all over his closet.
Gachako
Voiced by: Junko Hori (1973)
Gachako (ガチャ子) is an annoying female robot duck. She was removed from later versions of the manga and never appeared as a main character in either the 1979 or 2005 anime series due to the fact that Fujiko Fujio heavily disliked her annoying personality. She has not made any other appearances since then.
Botako
Voiced by: Masako Nozawa (1973), Kikumi Umeda (2005)
Botako (ボタ子, Botako) is a snobby and mean girl that rarely appears.
Jamako
Voiced by: Rihoko Yoshida (1973)
Jamako (ジャマ子), along with Debuko, one of Shizuka's friends in the 1973 anime.
Debuko
Voiced by: Noriko Tsukase (1973)
Debuko (デブ子, Debuko), along with Jamako, is one of Shizuka's friends in the 1973 anime.
Matsushiba Factory Manager
The main antagonist of "The Day Doraemon is Reborn". He blamed himself for Doraemon being an outmode, but after seeing Doraemon and Nobita's friendship and brotherhood, he aborted Doraemon's reset.
Yasuo
A character often seen with Gian and Suneo playing in vacant lot or in the baseball field. He is always seen wearing a baseball cap and often appears with Haruo.
Haruo
A character often seen with Gian and Suneo playing in vacant lot or in the baseball field. He is moderately fat and often appears with Yasuo.
