= Doraemon: Nobita's New Dinosaur =

2020 Anime film by Kazuaki Imai

Doraemon the Movie: Nobita's New Dinosaur
- Theatrical release poster

Japanese name
- Kanji: 映画ドラえもん のび太の新恐竜
Transcriptions
- Revised Hepburn: Doraemon Nobita no Shin Kyōryū
- Directed by: Kazuaki Imai
- Screenplay by: Genki Kawamura
- Based on: Doraemon by Fujiko F. Fujio
- Starring: Wasabi Mizuta; Megumi Ohara; Yumi Kakazu; Subaru Kimura; Tomokazu Seki; Aya Endō; Rie Kugimiya; Takuya Kimura; Naomi Watanabe; Yasuhiro Mamiya; Daisuke Ono
- Music by: Takayuki Hattori
- Production company: Shin-Ei Animation
- Distributed by: Toho
- Release date: 7 August 2020 (Japan)
- Running time: 111 minutes
- Country: Japan
- Language: Japanese
- Box office: $43 million

Doraemon: Nobita's New Dinosaur (映画ドラえもん のび太の新恐竜, Eiga Doraemon: Nobita no Shin Kyōryū) is a Japanese animated science fiction adventure film. It celebrates 50 years of the Doraemon franchise, alongside Stand by Me Doraemon 2. The screenplay for Doraemon: Nobita's New Dinosaur is written by Genki Kawamura. The film was initially planned to be released on March 6, 2020 but due to the COVID-19 pandemic, the film was postponed and was released on August 7, 2020.

== Plot ==
Nobita visits a dinosaur exhibition with his friend. In a fossil excavation experience there, he vows to his friends that he will discover a dinosaur and says that he will eat monkey nuts with his eyes if he fails. As he leaves the excavation experience, he trips over a rock and suspects that he has found the fossil of an egg. He goes home and convinces Doraemon to use the time wrapping cloth on the fossil egg, and two Sinosauropteryx emerge. Doraemon found that they are a new species of compsognathid not listed in the Complete Encyclopedia of Space. Nobita names the twin dinosaurs Kyu and Myu and under the advice of Dr. Dinosaur learned how to take care of them. The two fast-growing creatures gradually show differences in their development. Myu has learned to fly, but not the smaller Kyu. As Kyu and Myu grow, Nobita's room becomes too small for them, so they use the "Breeding Diorama Set" to give Kyu and Myu more freedom. The day when Nobita completes his dare arrive. When his friends arrive, they discover that Nobita has indeed found a dinosaur. At this point, Kyu and Myu make a lot of commotion, leading to Nobita's mother to come upstairs. They try to hide Kyu and Myu by using the spatial movement crayon, however, the townspeople see Kyu and Myu. Understanding that Kyu and Myu have reached their full size, they should return to their time. Nobita has trouble accepting this, but decides it might be the best option. The next morning, the five of them climb into the time machine.

With the Time Furoshiki, Doraemon's party goes back to the early part of the Late Cretaceous, calculated from the time of the fossil egg. However, they discovered that they were in Late Jurassic Colorado, the time where the Torvosaurus, Allosaurus, Diplodocus, Brachiosaurus, Camarasaurus, Apatosaurus, Hesperosaurus and Stegosaurus all live in. As they are rushing to return to the time machine, Nobita trips and loses the breeding diorama. The scene switches to a room where the actions of Nobita and his friends are secretly monitored by Jill, who has now shape-shifted into a white monkey, as he answers a call by a mysterious woman named Natalie. Unaware that they are being monitored, the group searches for Kyu and Myu's comrades, and finally reaches the sea. Along the way, they meet dinosaurs such as a Tarbosaurus and a Sinoceratops.

When Gian and Suneo go ahead to find more clues about Kyu and Myu's kind, they are captured by Jill, and Doraemon and the others are in danger of being attacked by a large Tupandactylus. Nobita and Kyu fall into the sea, but are helped by a Futabasaurus that is very similar to Piisuke, who took them to a mysterious island where they reunite with Doraemon, Shizuka, and Myu. This is an island inhabited by dinosaurs that look like them, the same species as Kyu and Myu. Nobita tries to get the two back to their group, but Kyu is scratched and refused by the group because they believe Kyu is different. It may be because, unlike the new dinosaurs, Kyu cannot fly and its tail is shorter. Nobita declares that Kyu can fly by itself.

Meanwhile, Jill and Natalie, who were on their way to the island on a submarine, said a deep impact was immediate. Gian and Suneo, who are watching them escape from the cage, look at the map and see the truth of the mysterious island. At the time, Nobita and Kyu, who had just started flying training, had a misunderstanding and the training was disrupted. Nobita looked down, silently encouraged, and when he searched for a note with the stick there was a figure of a mark who was constantly practicing alone. He started training to touch Nobita because he was able to do the reverse climb. At that moment, a huge object shining in the sky falls.

Gian and Suneo also ran further in, when they were all together, Doraemon tells everyone that this was the time period that caused the Cretaceous extinction when a meteorite struck Mexico on the Yucatán Peninsula 66 million years ago. Nobita tries to use an opposite direction to turn the meteorite into space, but the Time Patrol appears and Natalie stops the party's activities. Jill reveals that they were looking at this era as a one-time patrol, and insists that history cannot be changed even if he thinks about dinosaurs and is close to Nobita's heart. Nonetheless, Nobita, who tried to use the opposite direction machine, was stopped and detained by the Time Patrol. Kyu and Myu rush to protect Nobita, and Doraemon and others who tried to protect him are also detained. However, when Jill holds a check card on Nobita and Kyu, the card emits light. Jill and his Time Patrol group decide not to interfere in their activities.

As the team fights to help Kyu, Myu and the other dinosaurs, information provided by Gian and Suneo revealed that the island was actually the breeding diorama set, dropped by Nobita during their time at Colorado, and became active and larger as time passed. They decided to move the dinosaurs outside the island onto the island with the Space Movement Crayon and launch a rescue operation to protect them from the hot air of the meteorite collision with the Diorama's weather control function. As the meteorites approach, the Tupandactylus strikes Nobita and Doraemon as they are drawing the circle. As Nobita hangs onto the Tupandactylus, Kyu is attempting to fly to reach and rescue Nobita, but Kyu is struggling immensely. As Kyu tries and tries, Kyu is slowly evolving as he starts to flap his wings, and after multiple tries, Kyu was able to fly. Kyu rescues Nobita right after Nobita lets go due to exhaustion. From gliding to flapping, from dinosaurs to birds, Jill and his colleagues marvel at the birth of history as the first step in evolution. The dinosaurs were rescued and settled on the island, and Nobita and his friends said goodbye to Kyu and Myu. Jill exaggerates the caring heart like the dinosaur that formed the wings and the man who created so many emotions in the appearance of such a party. After returning to the current era, Nobita challenges himself to a bar reversal that he could not do, and eventually succeeds.

== Cast ==
Character	Japanese voice actor
Doraemon	Wasabi Mizuta
Nobita Nobi	Megumi Ōhara
Shizuka Minamoto	Yumi Kakazu
Suneo Honekawa	Tomokazu Seki
Takeshi "Gian" Gōda	Subaru Kimura
Tamako Nobi	Kotono Mitsuishi
Nobisuke Nobi	Yasunori Matsumoto
Dekisugi Hidetoshi	Shihoko Hagino
Teacher	Wataru Takagi
Jill	Takuya Kimura
Natalie	Naomi Watanabe
Kyu	Aya Endō
Myu	Rie Kugimiya
Gol	Yasuhiro Mamiya
Dr. Dinosaur	Daisuke Ono
Piisuke	Ryūnosuke Kamiki (archived recordings)

== Release ==
It was originally scheduled for release in Japan on 6 March 2020. However, due to the COVID-19 pandemic, the film was delayed to 7 August 2020. In Spain, the film was released in theatres on 10 November 2023.

== Box office ==
Debuting on 377 screens with limitations on seating capacity due to COVID-19 pandemic, Doraemon: Nobita's New Dinosaur earned $3.9 million on 334,000 admissions in its first weekend and ranked number-one on Japanese box office. It grossed $43 million at the box office.

Here is a table which shows the box office of this movie of all the weekends in Japan:

#	Rank	Weekend	Weekend gross	Total gross till current weekend
1	1	August 8–9	¥413,233,950 ($3.9 million)	¥551,742,600 ($5.2 million)
2	2	August 15–16	¥286,484,050 ($2.7 million)	¥1,659,811,650 ($15.6 million)
3	3	August 22–23	¥202,957,900 ($1.9 million)	¥2,195,713,950 ($20.7 million)
4	3	August 29–30	¥186,135,300 ($1.7 million)	¥2,494,795,400 ($23.4 million)
5	2	September 5–6	¥138,637,000 ($1.3 million)	¥2,694,047,700 ($25.3 million)
6	3	September 12–13	¥113,783,750 ($1.1 million)	¥2,844,505,250 ($26.8 million)
7	6	September 19–20	¥77,179,400 ($734,000)	¥2,950,000,000 ($28.7 million)
8	8	September 26–27	¥57,732,850 ($547,000)	¥3,115,915,200 ($29.3 million)
9	8	October 3–4	¥40,336,300 ($382,000)	¥3,173,949,500 ($29.8 million)
10	8	October 10–11	¥35,654,550 ($336,000)	¥3,219,738,200 ($30.4 million)
11	-	October 17–18	-	¥3,250,000,000 ($30.6 million)
12	9	October 24–25	¥16,147,380 ($154,787)	¥3,270,000,000 ($31.2 million)
FINAL TOTAL	-	-	-	¥3.35 billion($32.5 million)

== Soundtrack ==
The theme songs are “Birthday” and "A Monologue with you" by Mr.Children.

== See also ==
- List of Doraemon films
- List of films featuring dinosaurs
