= Subaru Kimura =

German–Japanese voice actor (born 1990)

- 木村 昴
- Born: Subaru Samuel Bartsch; June 29, 1990 (age 36); Blankenburg, Saxony-Anhalt, East Germany
- Other names: Suba (すば); Suba-chan (すばちゃん); Woody (ウッディー); Suba-nii (スバにぃ)
- Education: Asia University
- Occupations: Voice actor; actor; television personality; MC; rapper; narrator
- Years active: 2000–present
- Agent: Atomic Monkey
- Notable credits: Doraemon as Takeshi "Gian" Gōda; Jujutsu Kaisen as Aoi Tōdō; One Piece as Franky
- Family: Asuka Kimura (木村飛鳥) (sister)
- Website: Official profile

Subaru Samuel Bartsch (スバル・サミュエル・バーチュ, Subaru Samyueru Bāchu; born June 29, 1990), known professionally as Subaru Kimura (木村 昴, Kimura Subaru), is a German–Japanese voice actor, actor, television personality, MC, rapper, and narrator affiliated with Atomic Monkey.

His most well known roles as a voice actor are Takeshi "Gian" Gōda in Doraemon, Aoi Tōdō in Jujutsu Kaisen, and Franky in One Piece.

== Biography ==
=== Early life ===
Kimura was born on June 29, 1990 in Leipzig, Germany to a German opera singer father and a Japanese baroque music soloist and vocalist mother, with his grandmother giving him the name Subaru after the song "Subaru" by singer-songwriter Shinji Tanimura. Because of their occupations in the music industry, his parents were strict when it came to classical music as he started learning how to play the violin at the age of five, but this pressure ultimately backfired as it made Kimura dislike classical music.

He spent his early childhood in Germany before moving back to Japan at the age of seven. At the time, he couldn't speak Japanese, but after entering a local public elementary school, he learned the language communicating with teachers and classmates. Ever since he was a child, he had been a bit of a class clown, always eager to entertain friends, especially the girls. On the other hand, his mother had reportedly described him at the time as a "gentle, easy-to-raise child".

Since his childhood home was devoid of television and manga, he rarely watched anime growing up and possessed no interest in voice acting.

=== Career ===
He joined the Gekidan Nihon Jido, located near his house. He took the entry audition simply because it looked interesting after seeing a newspaper advertisement, and his mother also gave her permission, thinking he might have fun while learning Japanese. After he joined the company, while learning many disciplines like traditional Japanese dance, tap dance, and instruments, he became deeply passionate about acting lessons. Performing in the company's showcases eventually inspired him to become a musical actor. Although he aspired to be an opera singer around this time, he abandoned the dream, as he felt unable to surpass his parents and wished to take a different path, partly as an act of rebellion.

In 2002, he began his career as a tap dancer in the musical Annie. In elementary school, he appeared as a child who resembled Kenji Haga in the impersonation program Mimakin on Nippon TV. He later made several appearances on the Nippon TV program Monomane Battle under the stage name "Mini Mini Kenji Haga".

In 2005, he made his debut as a voice actor in the role of main character Takeshi Gōda, known famously by his nickname "Gian", in the TV Asahi television anime series Doraemon, taking over the role from Kazuya Tatekabe. He was only a second-year junior high school student when he heard about the all-new Doraemon cast and the upcoming auditions, so after consulting with the manager of the children's theater company he belonged to at the time, decided to audition. He only auditioned for the memory of it, expecting to fail, but was shocked to find out that he passed the initial voice-tape screening, making it to the second round in an actual dubbing booth.

As for why he chose the role of Gian, even though he was just auditioning for the experience, he was intimidated by the role of Doraemon thinking it was "just too big a name" and since Shizuka, Nobita, and Suneo were all too different from his own personality to connect with, he decided, "It has to be Gian." At the time, he knew little about anime or voice actors and didn't even realize at the time that his former co-star on Oha Suta, Kōichi Yamadera, was primarily a voice actor. The reason he auditioned at the time was to gain popularity in his class, as knowing about Doraemon itself, and thinking that saying "I auditioned for Doraemon" would turn him into a topic of conversation like a hero, he took the audition with the desire to liven up his class.

Since he had only ever auditioned for child-actor roles before, he assumed the production would be the same, expecting to see nothing but other children, but when he arrived at the studio for the second round, he found it packed with adult professional voice actors, including Wataru Takagi, who would voice Sensei. Feeling out of place, he thought to himself, "Oh no, I've gotten myself into something crazy..." The judges were kept blind to the participants' ages and backgrounds during the primary audition, making their decisions based solely on voice, so as a result, during the actual secondary audition, when Kimura told them he was 14 years old, they reportedly reacted with a "whhaat?!" similar to like in an anime.

During the group audition, the staff set a challenge, "Please create an original Takeshi. Do not impersonate the previous voice actor." However, not knowing how to portray the role, Kimura found himself influenced not only by the predecessor but also by the voices of Gian done by the other participants. Feeling panicky, he was on the verge of a total emotional breakdown. However, with the thought of 'I can't bear the frustration of going home like this' burning in his heart, he threw himself recklessly into the audition—a determination that ultimately got him to secure the role of Gian. He later asked the judging staff why he passed, to which a staff member told him with a laugh, "I've never seen anyone like that before. But honestly, you just looked like Gian to us." Once it became widely public knowledge that Kimura landed the role, classmates, upperclassmen, and underclassmen alike began calling him "Gian" or "Gian-senpai", which prompted a firm resolve within him to fully embrace living his life as the character Gian. From that point on, until he graduated from high school, he focused exclusively on voicing the character.

He graduated from Tokyo Metropolitan Harumi Sogo High School, but ended up dropping out of Asia University. After graduating, he intended to try his hand at a wide variety of roles, but realized he couldn't bring out any voice except for Gian's.

In 2009, he established the Genius Theater Company Bakabakka, serving as the company's leader. The company went on hiatus in 2023, but those involved have denied disbanding.

In 2011, he appeared as the voice of the character Kanba Takakura in the anime series Spinning Penguindrum. During the audition, the director Kunihiko Ikuhara called out to Kimura directly, telling him, "I have never met anyone as terrible as you." Kimura passed after being evaluated, "But you know, you have an incredibly great voice," and through the acting guidance required for the series, he finally broke out of the previously mentioned situation where all his voices came out like Gian's. It proved to be a major breakthrough in his career as a voice actor, as he began to appear in numerous other projects afterwards.

=== Current activity ===
In 2019, Kimura received the Singing Award as a part of Hypnosis Mic at the 13th Seiyu Awards. Since the following year in October 2020, he has served as the main MC for the TV Tokyo program Oha Suta.

In 2021, he ranked 5th in the Voice Actor category at the 8th Yahoo! Search Awards, and in 2023, ranked 3rd place in the same category at the 10th Yahoo! Search Awards.

In December 2024, it was revealed at Jump Festa '25 that Kimura would officially take over and succeed Kazuki Yao in the role of Franky in the One Piece television anime series. Kimura having previously voiced a younger Buggy in the series, Yao personally helped choose him as his successor. His first performance as the character was in episode 1,123, which aired on April 5th the following year.

In 2025, he received the Influencer Award at the 19th Seiyu Awards.

== Filmography ==
=== TV drama ===
- Tanken Bakumon (2012), Narrator
- Doubutsu Sentai Zyuohger (2016), Bowlingam (ep. 19–20)
- Uchu Sentai Kyuranger (2017), Seiza Blaster Voice, Ragio Voice (ep. 11–12), Dark Blaster (ep. 26, 28, 31)
- Mashin Sentai Kiramager (2020), Bomb Jamen (ep. 25-26)
- GARUGAKU. ~Girls Garden~ (2021), Subanii
- We Are Medical Interns (2021), Takeshi Yamashita (ep. 2, 4, 6–7)
- Kamen Rider Revice (2021), Vice / Kamen Rider Vice, Himself (30 – 31)
- The 13 Lords of the Shogun (2022), Prince Mochihito
- What Will You Do, Ieyasu? (2023), Watanabe Moritsuna
- Maybe Koi ga Kikoeru (2023), Yuto Fukamachi

=== Feature films ===
- Okashiratsuki (2023), Katsuragi
- Honeko Akabane's Bodyguards (2024), Iwao Ōmurai
- Black Showman (2025), Kodai Kashiwagi

=== Television animation ===
2005

- Doraemon (2005–present), Takeshi "Gian" Gōda

2011

- Penguindrum, Kanba Takakura, Penguin 1

2012

- Kuroko's Basketball, Papa Mbaye Siki
- Code:Breaker, Heike Masaomi

2013

- Gundam Build Fighters, Alan Adams

2014

- The Kindaichi Case Files R, Daisuke Kujiraki
- Psycho-Pass 2, Ogino
- Ping Pong: The Animation, Manabu Sakuma
- Black Bullet, Takuto Yasuwaki

2015

- Assassination Classroom, Ryōma Terasaka
- Dance with Devils, Mage Nanashiro

2016

- Sekkō Boys, Jiro Sandajima, Agrippa, Dionysos
- Bubuki Buranki, Sōya Arabashiri
- Assassination Classroom 2nd Season, Ryōma Terasaka
- Kagewani -II-, Jōji Honma
- 91 Days, Strega Galassia
- Haikyū!! Karasuno High School vs Shiratorizawa Academy, Satori Tendō
- Mobile Suit Gundam: Iron-Blooded Orphans, Dayne Uhai
- March Comes In like a Lion, Issa Matsumoto

2017

- Yu-Gi-Oh! VRAINS, Shōichi Kusanagi
- Puri Puri Chiichan!!, Chiteko (ep. 24)
- Altair: A Record of Battles, Kurt
- Boruto: Naruto Next Generations, Kū

2018

- Zombie Land Saga, Rapper A
- Devilman Crybaby, Gabi
- Zoids Wild, Gyoza

2019

- JoJo's Bizarre Adventure: Golden Wind, Pesci
- RobiHachi, Allo
- Midnight Occult Civil Servants, Kiyo Gongen
- Actors: Songs Connection, Chiguma Marume
- Carole & Tuesday, Ezekiel
- Case File nº221: Kabukicho, Masaya

2020

- Hypnosis Mic: Division Rap Battle: Rhyme Anima, Ichiro Yamada
- Jujutsu Kaisen, Aoi Todo
- Ikebukuro West Gate Park, Hiroto
- Haikyu!! Season 4, Satori Tendō
- Akudama Drive, Hoodlum

2021

- 2.43: Seiin High School Boys Volleyball Team, Yusuke Okuma
- Beastars Season 2, Free
- Dragon Quest: The Adventure of Dai , Galdandy
- The World Ends with You the Animation, Bito Daisukenojo
- Tokyo Revengers, Haruki Hayashida
- Re-Main, Jō Jōjima
- One Piece, Buggy (young)
- Demon Slayer: Kimetsu no Yaiba, Muscular Mice

2022

- Cap Kakumei Bottleman DX, Tsubasa Akaushi
- The Prince of Tennis II: U-17 World Cup, J. J. Dorgias
- RWBY: Ice Queendom, Cardin Winchester
- Yu-Gi-Oh! Go Rush!!, narrator

2023

- Hypnosis Mic: Division Rap Battle: Rhyme Anima+, Ichiro Yamada
- Kawagoe Boys Sing, Jin Adachi
- Jujutsu Kaisen Season 2, Aoi Todo
- Yu-Gi-Oh! Go Rush!!, Kuaidul

2024

- Suicide Squad Isekai, King Shark
- Chibi Godzilla Raids Again, Chibi Titano

2025

- One Piece, Franky
- Night of the Living Cat, Ren

2026

- Hikuidori, Torajiro

=== Original net animation (ONA) ===
- Monster Strike (2016), Sanjo Takii
- Koro-sensei Q! (2016), Ryoma Terasaka
- Gundam Build Fighters: Battlogue (2017), Allan Adams
- The Heike Story (2021)
- The Way of the Househusband (2021), Gōda
- Super Crooks (2021), Sammy Diesel
- Record of Ragnarok II (2023), Raiden Tameemon
- Gamera Rebirth (2023), Brody
- Onimusha (2023), Goro-Maru
- Disney Twisted-Wonderland the Animation (2025), Sam

=== Theatrical animation ===
- Doraemon: Nobita's Dinosaur 2006 (2006), Takeshi "Gian" Goda
- Furusato Japan (2007), Gonji Abe
- Doraemon: Nobita's New Great Adventure into the Underworld (2007), Takeshi "Gian" Goda
- Doraemon: Nobita and the Green Giant Legend (2008), Takeshi "Gian" Goda
- Doraemon: The New Record of Nobita's Spaceblazer (2009), Takeshi "Gian" Goda
- Doraemon: Nobita's Great Battle of the Mermaid King (2010), Takeshi "Gian" Goda
- Doraemon: Nobita and the New Steel Troops ~Winged Angels~ (2011), Takeshi "Gian" Goda
- Doraemon: Nobita and the Island of Miracles ~Animal Adventure~ (2012), Takeshi "Gian" Goda
- Doraemon: Nobita's Secret Gadget Museum (2013), Takeshi "Gian" Goda
- Doraemon: Nobita in the New Haunts of Evil ~Peko and the Five Explorers~ (2014), Takeshi "Gian" Goda
- Stand by Me Doraemon (2014), Takeshi "Gian" Goda
- Psycho-Pass: The Movie (2015), Sem
- Doraemon: Nobita's Space Heroes (2015), Takeshi "Gian" Goda
- Doraemon: Nobita and the Birth of Japan 2016 (2016), Takeshi "Gian" Goda
- Doraemon: Nobita's Great Adventure in the Antarctic Kachi Kochi (2017), Takeshi "Gian" Goda
- Dance with Devils: Fortuna (2017), Mage Nanashiro
- Doraemon: Nobita's Treasure Island (2018), Takeshi "Gian" Goda
- Doraemon: Nobita's Chronicle of the Moon Exploration (2019), Takeshi "Gian" Goda
- Doraemon: Nobita's New Dinosaur (2020), Takeshi "Gian" Goda
- Stand by Me Doraemon 2 (2020), Takeshi "Gian" Goda
- The Crocodile That Lived for 100 Days (2021), Mole
- Jujutsu Kaisen 0 (2021), Aoi Todo
- Doraemon: Nobita's Little Star Wars 2021 (2022), Takeshi "Gian" Goda
- Re:cycle of Penguindrum (2022), Kanba Takakura
- That Time I Got Reincarnated as a Slime the Movie: Scarlet Bond (2022), Lacua
- The First Slam Dunk (2022), Hanamichi Sakuragi
- Gold Kingdom and Water Kingdom (2023), Jauhara
- City Hunter The Movie: Angel Dust (2023), Espada
- Doraemon: Nobita's Sky Utopia (2023), Takeshi "Gian" Gōda
- Doraemon: Nobita's Earth Symphony (2024), Takeshi "Gian" Gōda
- Blue Lock: Episode Nagi (2024), Ryō Nameoka
- Doraemon: Nobita's Art World Tales (2025), Takeshi "Gian" Gōda
- Dive in Wonderland (2025), Tweedledum
- Doraemon: New Nobita and the Castle of the Undersea Devil (2026), Takeshi "Gian" Gōda
- Doraemon: Nobita's Steam-Powered Time Machine (2027), Takeshi "Gian" Gōda

=== Video games ===
- The World Ends with You (2007), Bito Daisukenojo
- Kingdom Hearts 3D: Dream Drop Distance (2012), Bito Daisukenojo
- Granblue Fantasy (2015), J.J., Takeshi "Gian" Goda
- IDOLiSH7 (2017), Inumaru Touma
- Kingdom Hearts HD 2.8 Final Chapter Prologue (2017), Aced, Bito Daisukenojo
- Shin Megami Tensei: Strange Journey Redux (2017), Zeus
- WarioWare Gold (2018), 18-Volt, Mr. Sparkles
- Kingdom Hearts III (2019), Aced
- Zoids Wild: Blast Unleashed (2019), Gyoza
- Fire Emblem: Three Houses (2019), Balthus
- The King of Fighters for Girls (2019), Ryo Sakazaki
- Hypnosis Mic -Alternative Rap Battle- (2020), Yamada Ichiro
- Disney Twisted-Wonderland (2020), Sam
- Final Fantasy VII Remake (2020), Kotch
- Helios Rising Heroes (2020), Asch Albright
- Soulcalibur VI (2020), Hwang Seong-gyeong
- DC Super Hero Girls: Teen Power (2021), Hal Jordan
- NEO: The World Ends With You (2021), Bito Daisukenojo
- WarioWare: Get It Together! (2021), 18-Volt
- Tales of Luminaria (2021), Raoul
- Shin Megami Tensei V (2021), Zeus
- JoJo's Bizarre Adventure: All Star Battle R (2022), Pesci
- Star Ocean: The Divine Force (2022), Raymond
- Jujutsu Kaisen: Cursed Clash (2024), Aoi Todo
- Hypnosis Mic -Dream Rap Battle- (2024), Yamada Ichiro

=== Music/drama CD ===
- Hypnosis Mic: Division Rap Battle (2017), Ichiro Yamada (MC B.B.)

=== Commercials ===
- The Way of the Househusband (2020), Goda

=== Dubbing ===
==== Live-action ====
- Taron Egerton
  - Testament of Youth, Edward Brittain
  - Kingsman: The Secret Service, Gary "Eggsy" Unwin
  - Kingsman: The Golden Circle, Gary "Eggsy" Unwin
  - Robin Hood, Robin Hood
  - Rocketman, Elton John
  - Tetris, Henk Rogers
- Winston Duke
  - Black Panther, M'Baku
  - Avengers: Infinity War, M'Baku
  - Avengers: Endgame, M'Baku
  - Black Panther: Wakanda Forever, M'Baku
  - The Fall Guy, Dan Tucker
  - Avengers: Doomsday, M'Baku
- Other
- The 100, Lincoln (Ricky Whittle)
- Bad Boys for Life, Dorn (Alexander Ludwig)
- Bad Boys: Ride or Die, Dorn (Alexander Ludwig)
- Bad News Bears, Mike Engelberg
- Bullet Train, The Wolf (Benito A. Martínez Ocasio)
- CJ7, Storm Dragon
- Cats, Plato and Socrates (Les Twins)
- Cinderella, Town Crier (Doc Brown)
- Dallas, Tommy Sutter (Callard Harris)
- Danger Close: The Battle of Long Tan, Major Harry Smith (Travis Fimmel)
- Dune: Part Two, Feyd-Rautha Harkonnen (Austin Butler)
- Dungeons & Dragons: Honor Among Thieves, Simon the Sorcerer (Justice Smith)
- Empire, Jamal Lyon (Jussie Smollett)
- Ender's Game, Dink Meeker (Khylin Rhambo)
- F1, Cashman (Samson Kayo)
- The Fast and the Furious: Tokyo Drift (2025 The Cinema edition), Twinkie (Bow Wow)
- F9, Twinkie (Bow Wow)
- Fantastic Four, Reed Richards/Mr. Fantastic (Miles Teller)
- Frankenstein's Army, Sergei (Joshua Sasse)
- Fury, Lt. Parker (Xavier Samuel)
- The Gallows, Ryan Shoos
- Get Smart (2011 TV Asahi edition), Lloyd (Nate Torrence)
- The Greatest Showman, Phillip Carlyle (Zac Efron)
- The Handmaid's Tale, Commander Nick Blaine (Max Minghella)
- Houdini & Doyle, George Gudgett (Adam Nagaitis)
- In the Heights, Usnavi (Anthony Ramos)
- Jexi, Kid Cudi
- The Little Mermaid, Sebastian (Daveed Diggs)
- Mulan, Yao (Chen Tang)
- Resident Evil: Welcome to Raccoon City, Chris Redfield (Robbie Amell)
- Snake Eyes, Snake Eyes (Henry Golding)
- Sonic the Hedgehog 2, Knuckles the Echidna (Idris Elba)
- Sonic the Hedgehog 3, Knuckles the Echidna (Idris Elba)
- Spin Out, Billy (Xavier Samuel)
- Superfly, Eddie (Jason Mitchell)
- Tom & Jerry, Terrance (Michael Peña)
- Top Gun: Maverick, Reuben "Payback" Fitch (Jay Ellis)

==== Animation ====
- The Book of Life, Manolo Sánchez
- Mao Mao: Heroes of Pure Heart, Badgerclops
- Megamind, Hal Stewart/Tighten
- New Looney Tunes, Snoop Dogg
- Pac-Man and the Ghostly Adventures, Skeebo
- Puss in Boots: The Last Wish, Baby Bear
- RWBY, Cardin Winchester
- The Secret Life of Pets 2, Chuck
- Sing, Ricky
- Sing 2, Darius
- Smallfoot, Migo
- Soul, Paul
- Spider-Man: Across the Spider-Verse, Hobie Brown / Spider-Punk
- Star Wars Resistance, Kazuda Xiono
- Toy Story 5
- Transformers One, D-16 / Megatron
- Trolls World Tour, Tiny Diamond
- Trolls Band Together, Tiny Diamond
