= Vanilla Yamazaki =

Japanese actress and choreographer (born 1978)

- 山崎 バニラ
- Born: Masami Yamazaki (山崎 雅美); January 15, 1978 (age 48); Shiroishi, Miyagi Prefecture, Japan
- Education: Tokyo Metropolitan Koyamadai High School; Seisen University
- Occupations: Katsudō-benshi; voice actress; actress; choreographer; tarento
- Years active: 2000–present
- Notable credits: Doraemon as Jaiko Gōda
- Spouse: Undisclosed (m. 2014)
- Children: 1
- Family: Nobutoshi Yamazaki (father)
- Website: Official website

Masami Yamazaki (山崎 雅美, Yamazaki Masami; born January 15, 1978), known professionally by the name Vanilla Yamazaki (山崎 バニラ, Yamazaki Banira) is a katsudō-benshi, voice actress, actress, choreographer, and tarento born in Shiroshi, Miyagi Prefecture, Japan and raised in Ōta, Tokyo.

== Biography ==
Yamazaki was born on January 15, 1978 in Shiroishi, Miyagi Prefecture and was raised in Ōta, Tokyo. Her father is Nobutoshi Yamazaki, an engineer and professor emeritus at Keio University, and her mother is a piano teacher. At the age of four, she began learning piano, modern ballet, and painting.

She graduated from Tokyo Metropolitan Koyamadai High School in 1996 and the Department of Spanish Language and Literature in the Faculty of Letters at Seisen University in 2000.

While in college, she participated in the Waseda University Musical Theater Society. Around that time, she also appeared in numerous independent films. After graduating, she began to work as a dancer, stage actress, and voice actress.

In 2000, she passed an audition to perform katsudō-benshi for the grand opening of the Tokyo Kinema Club, officially launching her career as a katsudō-benshi. The reason for taking the katsudō-benshi audition was because she was attracted to the sound of "storytelling art", also because she wanted to utilize her unique voice. Until then, she aspired to the entertainment world and said that she kept taking various auditions.

When performing katsudō-benshi or making television appearances, she sports a blonde short-bob wig (which looks silver under certain lighting, but is gold in natural light) paired with traditional Japanese clothing. Initially, she reportedly borrowed most of her kimono stage outfits from her grandmother. She primarily plays a taishōgoto that her grandmother had bought through mail order but had been left unused. She started sporting a blonde wig as a creative way to capture a sci-fi vibe when introducing The Matrix on television and drew inspiration from Giulietta Masina, a famous actress whom people had often told her she resembled. Combined with her self-accompanied taishōgoto playing and distinctive "anime voice", her striking presence leaves a powerful, lasting impression to anyone who watches her. Though when she appeared on the morning show Tokudane!, she performed in her natural hair. As her media appearances grew, her collection of kimonos expanded, and now sometimes performs using a semi-custom-made taishōgoto.

In 2005, she began voicing the reoccuring character Jaiko Gōda in the TV Asahi television anime Doraemon, which captured significant attention across various media outlets. During the initial voice actor auditions, she originally tried for the role of the main female protagonist Shizuka Minamoto and was able to make it to the final round, but ended up being rejected. She later commented in a television interview, "I think I might actually be a better fit for Jaiko or Dorami." This remark caught attention and lead to her landing the role of Jaiko, with the role of Dorami going to television personality Chiaki, who had similarly been initially rejected during the same voice actor auditions.

In November 2010, following the expiration of her exclusive contract with her previous agency Spark Staff, she established her own private office, Vanilla Quest, and began working as a freelancer. This led to a legal dispute with Spark Staff over the contract renewal, as the agency claimed that the contract was still in effect. On March 14, 2012, the court ruled entirely in Yamazaki's favor, declaring that her exclusive contract had indeed ended.

Today, she performs in a brand-new style as a katsudō-benshi, accompanying her storytelling on the taishōgoto and piano. She boasts a repertoire of about 20 titles, primarily focusing on short films. In addition to her work as a katsudō-benshi, she is highly active across a wide range of fields, including dance choreography, voice acting, and narration for television programs and commercials.

== Personal life ==
On November 13, 2014, she married an office employee with whom she had been in a relationship for sixteen and a half years, dating back to her time as a student. Nearly two years later on May 19, 2016, she announced that she was six months pregnant with her first child. That same year, on October 4, she announced that she had given birth to a baby girl at the end of the previous month.

== Filmography ==
=== Television animation ===
List of voice performances in television animation
Year	Title	Role	Notes	Source
2001	Okojo's Happy Apartment	Chorori		
2003	The Galaxy Railways	Girl	Ep. 1	
2004	Tsukuyomi: Moon Phase	Haiji		
2005	Twin Princess of Wonder Planet	Tio	First voice; Eps. 1-26	
2005	Doraemon	Jaiko Gōda		
2005	Pani Poni Dash!	Mesousa		
2005	IGPX	Luka		
2006	Ghost Slayers Ayashi	Fox		
2007	My Bride Is a Mermaid	Narration	Ep. 20	
2012	Chihayafuru	Karuta Reader		
2012	Kamisama Kiss	Narrator		
2014	Yo-Kai Watch	Kin		
2017	Blend S	Vanilla-chan	Ep. 11	
2018	Pochi-to Hatsumei Pikachin-Kit	Pochiro		
2026	Ojarumaru	Hoshimi		

=== Theatrical animation ===
List of voice performances in theatrical animation
Year	Title	Role	Notes	Source
2003	Ryōkan	Oyuki		
2004	Fuichin-san	Purinasun		
2007	Doraemon the Movie: Nobita's New Great Adventure into the Underworld ~The 7 Magic Users~	Obligator		
2008	Pocket Monsters Diamond & Pearl the Movie: Giratina and the Bouquet of the (Frozen) Sky: Shaymin	Shaymin		
2014	Stand by Me Doraemon	Jaiko Gōda, Future Jaiko Gōda		
2014	Yo-kai Watch the Movie: Its the Secret of Birth, Meow!	Kin		
2016	Colorful Ninja Iromaki	Aomaki	Short film	
2020	Stand by Me Doraemon 2	Future Jaiko Gōda		

=== Original video animation (OVA) ===
List of voice performances in original video animation
Year	Title	Role	Notes	Source
2008	My Bride Is a Mermaid	Narration		

=== Video games ===
List of voice performances in video games
Year	Title	Role	Notes	Source
2014	Yo-kai Watch 2	Kin, Ikuyone		
2018	Pikachin-Kit: Game de Pirameki Daisakusen!	Pochiro		
2022	Yo-kai Watch: Wibble Wobble	Yami Kin, Ikuyone		
