= Stand by Me Doraemon =

Japanese 2014 film by Ryūchi Yagi and Takashi Yamazaki

- Theatrical release poster

Japanese name
- Kanji: STAND BY ME ドラえもん
- Literal meaning: Stand By Me Doraemon
- Directed by: Ryūichi Yagi; Takashi Yamazaki
- Screenplay by: Takashi Yamazaki
- Based on: Doraemon by Fujiko F. Fujio
- Produced by: Shūji Abe; Okura Shunsuke; Keiichiro Moriya; Kiyoko Shibuya; Maiko Okada
- Starring: Wasabi Mizuta; Megumi Ōhara; Yumi Kakazu; Subaru Kimura; Tomokazu Seki; Sachi Matsumoto; Vanilla Yamazaki; Shihoko Hagino; Kotono Mitsuishi; Yasunori Matsumoto; Miyako Takeuchi; Aruno Tahara
- Edited by: Tomomi Kikuchi
- Music by: Naoki Satō
- Production companies: Shirogumi; Robot Communications; Shin-Ei Animation
- Distributed by: Toho
- Release date: August 8, 2014 (Japan)
- Running time: 95 minutes
- Country: Japan
- Language: Japanese
- Box office: $183.4 million

Stand by Me Doraemon (Japanese: STAND BY ME ドラえもん, Hepburn: Sutando Bai Mī Doraemon) is a 2014 Japanese animated science fiction comedy-drama film based on the Doraemon manga series and directed by Ryūichi Yagi and Takashi Yamazaki. It was released in Japan on August 8, 2014. It is the highest-grossing film of the Doraemon franchise. Bang Zoom! Entertainment premiered an English-dubbed version of the film at the Tokyo International Film Festival on October 24, 2014.

Stand by Me Doraemon was commercially successful in Japan. It was number one on the box office charts for five consecutive weeks and was the second highest-grossing animated film of 2014 in Japan, with a box office total of $183.4 million, behind Disney's Frozen. In February 2015, the film won the Japan Academy Prize for Animation of the Year at the 38th Japan Academy Prize.

A sequel was released in Japan on November 20, 2020.

The film is primarily based on the 1970 chapter "All the Way From the Future", the 1973 chapter "Mountain Rescue", the 1980 chapter "Goodbye Shizuka", the 1984 chapter "Imprinting Shizuka", Doraemon Comes Back, and Nobita's the Night Before a Wedding, though several other chapters are briefly brought up as well.

== Plot ==
Nobita Nobi is a fifth grader who constantly gets failing grades in his subjects due to his laziness and is always bullied by his classmates Suneo Honekawa and Takeshi "Gian" Goda. His great-great-grandson from the 22nd century, Sewashi, who watches him every day, travels to Nobita's timeline while bringing along his robotic cat Doraemon. Sewashi reveals that if Nobita keeps up his act, he will have a disastrous future: he will marry Gian's sister Jaiko, have his company burned down, and be left with such great debt Sewashi's family still has to deal with it. To circumvent this, he orders Doraemon to help Nobita, twisting Doraemon's nose to prevent him from returning to the future unless Nobita gains a better future.

Being reluctant until the threat, Doraemon introduces his gadgets to help Nobita which helps him immensely. Though Doraemon warns Nobita not to be too dependent on his gadgets, Nobita asks Doraemon to help him woo his crush, Shizuka Minamoto whom Doraemon reveals is the one Nobita will marry if his future is corrected. However, all his efforts end up making Shizuka closer to ace student, Dekisugi Hidetoshi. Nobita's attempt to be equal to Dekisugi by studying harder is futile, and he decides to let go of Shizuka to make her happier. He does this by flipping Shizuka's skirt to reveal her underwear (but not looking at it), resulting in Shizuka screaming and holding her skirt down in embarrassment before slapping him and running away in tears. After a while, Shizuka realizes that Nobita had his eyes shut when he did this to her. This makes her start worrying about Nobita. She overhears Gian and Suneo's conversation about Nobita's self-esteem getting crushed by Sensei for recently failing another test, causing her to believe he is planning to commit suicide, Shizuka arrives at Nobita's house and resists Nobita's people-repelling potion to help him, which Doraemon reveals is the first step in Nobita and Shizuka's growing relationship to eventually becoming a couple.

After seeing his older self rejecting Shizuka's invitation to mountain climbing, Nobita disguises himself as his older self to help Shizuka, who becomes separated from her group during a heavy blizzard. His efforts to help Shizuka do more harm to himself, but make Shizuka feel that she has to accompany Nobita, saying "Yes" before collapsing from the cold she contracted from her earlier conversation with Nobita. Forcing himself to remember the moment, the two are rescued by Nobita's older self, who recalled the memory. Nobita learns from his older self that Shizuka was answering to latter's proposition to marry her. Meaning that Shizuka will indeed marry Nobita. After hearing that Shizuka's father has also accepted Nobita as his daughter's spouse, Nobita and Doraemon return to the present timeline. Nobita visits Shizuka declaring that he will make her happy whatever it takes.

As Nobita's future has been changed for the better, Doraemon's programming commands him to return to the future in 48 hours. Noticing that Doraemon has a hard time leaving due to his worry for him, Nobita confronts and has a brutal fight with Gian to prove that he can defend himself without Doraemon. Seeing that Nobita refuses to give up, Gian forfeits as Doraemon tearfully takes Nobita home before leaving in peace the next day. During April Fools, Nobita is tricked by Gian into believing that Doraemon has returned. In anger, he drinks a solution Doraemon gave to him, which makes the opposite of everything the consumer says comes true. Finishing his retribution against Suneo (who was chased by a dog trying to bite him) and Gian (who was being dragged away by his mother, who was preparing to punish him), Nobita goes back home while lamenting that Doraemon will never return. To his surprise, Doraemon suddenly returns and tells Nobita that he has gotten permission to stay with him because Nobita said that Doraemon would never return, still with the effects of the potion, and the opposite became true. They both hug and cry in happiness.

== Production ==
In 2011, the producers said: "Different from the other Doraemon films, this will be a special film". The production team spent 18 months on the character design and CGI animation began after the film recorded the voice of characters.

=== Adaptation ===
The plot combines elements from the short stories "All the Way from the Country of the Future", "Imprinting Egg", "Goodbye, Shizuka-chan", "Romance in Snowy Mountain", "Nobita's the Night Before a Wedding" and "Goodbye, Doraemon..." into a new complete story – from the first time Doraemon came to Nobita's house to Doraemon bidding farewell to Nobita.

== Cast ==
Character	Japanese voice actor	English voice actor
Doraemon	Wasabi Mizuta	Mona Marshall
Nobita Nobi	Megumi Ōhara Satoshi Tsumabuki (adult)	Johnny Yong Bosch
Sewashi	Sachi Matsumoto	Max Mittelman
Shizuka Minamoto	Yumi Kakazu	Cassandra Morris
Suneo Honekawa	Tomokazu Seki	Brian Beacock
Takeshi "Gian" Gōda	Subaru Kimura	Kaiji Tang
Jaiko Gōda	Vanilla Yamazaki	Minae Noji
Hidetoshi Dekisugi	Shihoko Hagino	Spike Spencer
Teacher	Wataru Takagi	Keith Silverstein
Tamako Nobi	Kotono Mitsuishi	Mari Devon
Nobisuke Nobi	Yasunori Matsumoto	Tony Oliver
Mrs. Gōda	Miyako Takeuchi	Jessica Gee
Yoshio Minamoto	Aruno Tahara	Steve Blum

== Soundtrack ==
Stand by Me Doraemon Original Soundtrack

Soundtrack album by Naoki Satō
- Released: September 17, 2014
- Genres: Soundtrack; Music
- Length: 46:56
- Label: Nippon Columbia

All music is composed by Naoki Satō.

Stand by Me Doraemon Original Soundtrack
No.	Title	Length
1.	"Nobita no Ichinichi"	2:13
2.	"STAND BY ME Doraemon Opening Title"	1:09
3.	"Boku, Doraemon"	0:54
4.	"Takecopter"	2:48
5.	"Yojigen Pocket"	3:25
6.	"Surikomi Tamago"	1:14
7.	"Suneo Love"	0:48
8.	"Sakusen Shippai"	1:13
9.	"Shitsuren?"	2:02
10.	"Benkyou"	1:01
11.	"Test no Kekka"	2:00
12.	"Sayounara, Shizuka-chan"	3:53
13.	"Mushisukan"	2:02
14.	"Boku no Mirai"	2:59
15.	"Nobita Seinen"	2:11
16.	"Todoke, Kono Kioku!"	1:55
17.	"Tomodachi"	2:55
18.	"Mirai Hikou"	1:37
19.	"Kekkon Zen'ya"	2:59
20.	"Doraemon no Namida"	1:31
21.	"Yakusoku"	4:10
22.	"Saikai ~Uso 800 no Kiseki~"	1:57
Total length:		46:56

The ending theme, Himawari no Yakusoku (ひまわりの約束, lit. "The Sunflower's Promise") was composed and sung by Motohiro Hata.

== Release ==
The film was released in Japan on August 8, 2014, and in Italy on November 6, 2014. In Indonesia and Singapore, the film was released on December 10 and 11, 2014, respectively. In Spain and Taiwan, the film was released on December 19, 2014. In Thailand, the film was released on December 31, 2014. In Malaysia, the film was released on January 29, 2015, and in Hong Kong, the film was released on February 5, 2015. The film was released in Vietnam on December 12, 2014, with broadcast on June 1, 2015, by K+ NS The film was released in the Philippines on June 17, 2015, announced by SM Cinema on Facebook, and distributed by VIVA International Pictures & Multivision Pictures Entertainment. The film was released in Turkey on September 11, 2015 The film was released in China on May 28, 2015, becoming the first and only Japanese film to be released in mainland China after Ultraman in July 2012 in three years. Altogether, the film was released in 60 countries worldwide. The film was released in the United States on Netflix on December 24, 2021.

In Japan, the film was released on Blu-ray, in a deluxe and normal edition, and on DVD by Pony Canyon on February 18, 2015. The DVDs and Blu-rays released in Hong Kong feature English subtitles. The iTunes release in Singapore also includes English subtitles.

== Reception ==
=== Box office ===
The film earned a total of US$86 million internationally by January 7, 2015, and was also the third-highest earning film in Japan in 2014 with ¥8.38 billion, behind Frozen and The Eternal Zero. Outside Japan, the highest revenue came from China ($86.92 million), Hong Kong ($5.1 million), South Korea ($3.3 million), Italy ($3.2 million), Indonesia ($3 million) and Thailand ($1.2 million).

In Japan, the film earned ¥767 million in the first 2 days and ¥988 million after 3 days. After 40 days, the film earned ¥7 billion and ¥8 billion after 76 days. The film – after the release day – was ranked 1st in cinemas in Japan for 5 weeks continuously. As of December 2014, the film earned ¥8.38 billion ($70 million) in Japan.

The film performed well in Hong Kong, which was partly boosted by the sudden death of the long-time voice actor of Doraemon, Lam Pou-chuen, a month before the movie's local release. It became the all-time highest-grossing Japanese film in Hong Kong (breaking Ring's record), the highest-grossing film of the Chinese New Year period in Hong Kong (from 18 to 21 February) and the all-time fourth highest-grossing animated film in Hong Kong, behind Pixar's Toy Story 3, Monsters University and Inside Out. It also broke the opening-day record (previously held by Ponyo). In China, the film scored a single-day record of US$14.2 million (breaking Kung Fu Panda 2's record) and a four-day opening record of US$38.5 million (breaking How to Train Your Dragon 2's record). In just five days it earned $53 million to become the highest-grossing non-Hollywood animated film in China (breaking Boonie Bears: A Mystical Winter's record). It is currently the third highest-grossing animated film in China ($86.9 million), behind Kung Fu Panda 2 ($92.2 million) and Big Hero 6 ($86.7 million). It ended its run in China with CN¥530,06 million ($86.9 million).

A web survey was published, giving a closer look at the attendees. The audience consisted of 20.4% were children, 21.5% were in their 20s, 20.4% were in their 30s, 20.4% were in their 40s. 47% were male while 53% were female.

== Accolades ==
Awards
Year	Award	Category	Recipients and nominees	Result	Ref.
2014	Lumiere Japan Awards Grand Prix	Grand Prix Award	Stand by Me Doraemon	Won	
2014	27th Nikkan Sports Award	Direction Award	Takashi Yamazaki	Won	
2015	3D Film Award	Jury Award for Foreign Animation	Stand by Me Doraemon	Won	
2015	38th Japan Academy Prize	Animation of the Year	Stand by Me Doraemon	Won	
2015	Tokyo Anime Award	Anime of the Year (Film Category)	Stand by Me Doraemon	Notable Entry	
2015	Yubari International Fantastic Film Festival	VFX JAPAN AWARD	Ryūichi Yagi	Won	
2015	20th AMD Awards	Digital Media Award	Stand by Me Doraemon	Won	
2015	24th The Japan Film Critics Award	Lifetime Achievement Award	Michihiko Umezawa and Shuji Abe	Won	
2015	34th Fujimoto Prize		Ito Yoshiaki, Michihiko Umezawa and Shuji Abe	Won	

== Related products ==
Eiga Stand by Me Doraemon Visual Story
- Author: Fujiko F. Fujio
- Original title: 映画「STAND BY ME ドラえ もん」VISUAL STORY
- Language: Japanese
- Series: Doraemon
- Genre: Adventure, Time travel, Romantic, Comedy, Family
- Publisher: Shogakukan
- Publication date: August 7, 2014
- Publication place: Japan
- Media type: Shinsho
- Pages: 80
- ISBN: 9784093883818

- New translation "Doraemon"

Fujiko · F · Fujio (writer), Hiroshi Sasaki (editor), Fujiko Pro (monitoring) ISBN 978-4-09-388384-9
A book containing 7 short stories, with commentary by Hiroshi Sasaki.

- Stand by Me Doraemon Animation Visual Story

Fujiko F. Fujio (Writer) ISBN 978-4-09-388381-8

Adapted from the film

- BD / DVD

Released February 18, 2015, with PCXE-50408 (BD special version), PCXE-50409 (BD Normal version), PCBE-54251 (DVD Limit Version)

== Cultural impact ==
On the Japanese talk show Tetsuko's Room, Doraemon, animated in CGI, was invited to interview and was broadcast on television on August 8, 2014.

The film helped ease diplomatic tensions between China and Japan. Nagoya University professor Kawamura Noriyuki said that the film was able to help the Chinese people have a better look at the Japanese people.

== Sequel ==
On December 12, 2019, the sequel, Stand By Me Doraemon 2, was announced. Ryūichi Yagi and Takashi Yamazaki returned as directors, with Yamazaki once again penning the script. Largely based on the 2000 short film Doraemon: A Grandmother's Recollections, it was originally slated to release on August 7, 2020, but was postponed to November 20, 2020, due to the COVID-19 pandemic.
