= Doraemon: Nobita in the New Haunts of Evil ~ Peko and the Five Explorers ~ =

2014 film by Shinnosuke Yakuwa

Doraemon the Movie: Nobita in the New Haunts of Evil ~ Peko and the Five Explorers ~
- Japanese theatrical poster

Japanese name
- Kanji: 映画ドラえもん 新・のび太の大魔境〜ペコと5人の探検隊〜
- Literal meaning: Doraemon: New Nobita's Great Demon—Peko and the Exploration Party of Five
Transcriptions
- Revised Hepburn: Eiga Doraemon Shin Nobita no Daimakyo ~Peko to 5-nin no Tankentai~
- Directed by: Shinnosuke Yakuwa
- Written by: Higashi Shimizu
- Based on: Doraemon Long Stories: Nobita and the Haunts of Evil by Fujiko F. Fujio
- Starring: Wasabi Mizuta; Megumi Ōhara; Yumi Kakazu; Tomokazu Seki; Subaru Kimura; Yu Kobayashi; Kenji Tada; Shun Oguri; Miku Natsume; Yoshi Yamada; Kotono Mitsuishi; Yasunori Matsumoto
- Music by: Kan Sawada
- Production company: Shin-Ei Animation
- Distributed by: Toho
- Release date: March 8, 2014
- Running time: 109 minutes
- Country: Japan
- Language: Japanese
- Box office: $35.9 million

Doraemon: Nobita in the New Haunts of Evil ~ Peko and the Five Explorers ~ (映画ドラえもん 新・のび太の大魔境〜ペコと5人の探検隊〜, Eiga Doraemon Shin Nobita no Daimakyo ~Peko to 5-nin no Tankentai~) is a 2014 Japanese animated science fiction adventure film. It is a remake of the 1982 film, Doraemon: Nobita and the Haunts of Evil. The film was released in Japan on March 8, 2014. It's the 34th Doraemon film. The movie was the 5th highest grossing anime film of 2014 in Japan. The film's opening theme song is "Yume wo Kanaete Doraemon", performed by mao and the film's ending theme song is "Hikari no Signal" performed by Kis-My-Ft2.

== Plot ==
Gian, Nobita and Suneo discuss about going for an adventure in their summer vacation. Suneo and Gian get tired of thinking about this, so they pass this responsibility to Nobita. Nobita asks Doraemon to do so and they launch a rocket on their roof to take photos of each and every small part of the Earth. Meanwhile, Nobita's mother, Tamako tasks Nobita into picking up some groceries. On his way to the market, he passes the playground where he sees a dog all by itself. Feeling sorry for the dog, Nobita purchases some sausages while running his errands and gives some to the dog. Back home, Nobita and Doraemon look for a better way to find a good place for their adventure after realizing that the satellite would produce over 930 million photos.

Nobita soon discovers that the dog he ran into earlier followed him home. Tamako, who does not allow pets, tells Nobita that her purse is missing. After the dog easily finds the purse through the scent of Tamako's slipper, Nobita is allowed to keep the dog and names him Peko. Peko finds a photo of a mysterious statue covered in fog somewhere in Africa and the group decide to find and solve the mystery. Excited that they might have found something no one has discovered, Nobita, Doraemon, and all of their friends including Shizuka, Gian, and Suneo planned to go to an expedition to find the statue. After the first day of the expedition, Gian got annoyed by the group's over reliance to Doraemon's gadgets (including Shizuka using the Anywhere Door to go home to use the restroom) and angrily calls off the adventure.

At night, however, he was visited by the mysterious statue at his bedroom, who tells him about hidden treasure before disappearing. Interested, Gian rejoins the group the next day, but tells Doraemon to leave any gadgets that they use the day before. When they are cruising on a river with a ship, Gian forgot to steer it when he was throwing coconuts at crocodiles, causing the ship to crash. With the Anywhere Door burned by people mistakenly thought it was garbage, the group was almost swarmed by crocodiles, but they got rescued by a group of natives, who takes them to the village. The natives knows about the mysterious statue, and told Doraemon that they have to go through a lion infested savanna and a very deep gorge.

When the group reached the savanna, the mysterious statue appears again and drives the lions off. When they safely reached the bottom of the deep gorge and figured out the superstitions surrounding it, Peko, now fully trusting the group, reveals himself to be a prince of a kingdom of bipedal dogs with human intelligence. He told them that the evil minister Daburanda and his lackey Dr. Kos was planning to conquer the world, assassinates the king, and accidentally throws Peko, who's trapped in a coffin, into the underground river in the gorge, causing him to meet Nobita. Doraemon and his friends decided to help him. First they searched for Burusasu, one of Peko's loyal bodyguards, but found out he's arrested by Daburanda's soldiers.

After helping a young puppy named Chippo, they free Burusasu from a prison, but Daburanda and his army commander, Saberu, realizes that Peko is back, and began a search for him and Doraemon's group. Daburanda also reveals that he has princess Spiana captive in his palace. While everyone is hiding from Daburanda's soldiers, Burusasu said there was a saying that, "When the world will be covered by darkness, 10 travelers will come and move the statue's heart to save the palace.". Doraemon think the travelers are him, Nobita, Shizuka, Gian, and Suneo, but realizes there's only five of them. When Chippo is hungry, Doraemon uses the "Anticipating Promise Machine" to make everyone feel full, but they have to fulfill the promise the next day.

The next night, the group went to the statue, but were ambushed by Daburanda's soldiers. Burusasu faces the soldiers and lets Peko pass, but soon they got cornered by Dr. Kos and his aerial fleet. Peko was willing to hold the army back while the group escape, but Gian followed him (possibly to punish himself for the trouble he caused everyone), and soon the entire group does. Finally they decided to get to the statue together, which is guarded by Daburanda, Saberu, and an army. When Nobita wonders about the old saying of ten travelers, Shizuka uses the Anticipating Promise Machine for help. Suddenly, a second group of Doraemon, Nobita, Shizuka, Gian, and Suneo appears, fully equipped with weapon gadgets, and fights Daburanda and his army while the main group enters the statue, followed by Saberu.

When Nobita lags behind, Saberu catches up to him. Despite given the Denkomaru sword, Nobita takes a long time to defeat Saberu. The group fighting the army is also forced to retreat when Dr. Kos arrives. Eventually, Peko and the rest of the group manages to reach the statue's heart, which is a mechanism to bring the statue 'alive' like a robot. Using it, Dr. Kos and the army was defeated, and Daburanda flees to the palace. He tried to bring princess Spiana with him, but Peko, using the statue, arrives in time and rescues her. Peko soon became the rightful ruler of the kingdom, and the other Doraemon gives the original Doraemon a new Anywhere Door to go home. When the group came back home, they realized that they still have to fulfill one last promise made from the Anticipating Promise Machine. Nobita leads everyone to the Time Machine in order to go back in time and help their past selves fight Daburanda's army and enter the statue.

== Cast ==
- Wasabi Mizuta - Doraemon
- Megumi Ōhara - Nobita Nobi
- Yumi Kakazu - Shizuka Minamoto
- Tomokazu Seki - Suneo Honekawa
- Subaru Kimura - Takeshi "Gian" Gōda
- Yu Kobayashi - Peko
- Cowcow - Bernard, Buruteri
- Miku Natsume - Princess Spiana
- Shun Oguri - Sarbel
- Yoshi Yamada - Balderry
- Kotono Mitsuishi - Tamako Nobi
- Yasunori Matsumoto - Nobisuke Nobi
- Katsuhisa Houki - Kaminari-san
- Chika Sakamoto - Chippo
- Masashi Hirose - Brutus
- Shozo Iizuka - Daburanda
- Tadashi Miyazawa - Kos
- Shihoko Hagino - Hidetoshi Dekisugi
- Junichi Sugawara - Schnauzer
- Yayoi Sugaya - Dole
- Eiji Yanagisawa - Shiva
- Sayaka Ohara - Colline
- Ryo Kuratomi - Monster

== Release ==
The film premiered in Japan in theaters on 8 March 2014. It was also released by Disney Channel India with the title Doraemon the Movie: Nobita the Explorer, Bow! Bow!

== Reception ==
Released alongside Frozen, it finished in second place in its first weekend behind Frozen. It stayed in second place for 6 weeks. As of May 4, 2014, the film grossed US$37,989,696 worldwide and 3,870,059,233.92 yen in Japan, becoming the third highest grossing Doraemon film in Japan.

== Soundtrack ==
- Opening song: "Yume wo Kanaete Doraemon" (夢をかなえてドラえもん), performed by MAO.
- Theme song: "Hikari no Signal" (光のシグナル), performed by Kis-My-Ft2.

== See also ==
- List of Doraemon films
