= Stand by Me Doraemon 2 =

2020 film by Takashi Yamazaki and Ryuichi Tagi

- Theatrical release poster

Japanese name
- Kanji: STAND BY ME ドラえもん 2
- Literal meaning: Stand By Me Doraemon 2
- Directed by: Ryuichi Yagi; Takashi Yamazaki
- Screenplay by: Takashi Yamazaki
- Based on: Doraemon by Fujiko F. Fujio
- Produced by: Keiichiro Moriya; Kazuhiko Akatsu; Kiyoko Shibuya; Reina Takahashi
- Starring: Wasabi Mizuta; Megumi Ōhara; Yumi Kakazu; Subaru Kimura; Tomokazu Seki; Kotono Mitsuishi; Yasunori Matsumoto; Shihoko Hagino; Nobuko Miyamoto; Satoshi Tsumabuki
- Edited by: Ryuichi Yagi
- Music by: Naoki Satō
- Production companies: Shirogumi; Robot Communications; Shin-Ei Animation
- Distributed by: Toho
- Release date: November 20, 2020
- Running time: 90 minutes
- Country: Japan
- Language: Japanese
- Box office: $65.2 million

Stand by Me Doraemon 2 (STAND BY ME ドラえもん 2) is a 2020 Japanese animated science fiction comedy film based on the Doraemon manga series and a sequel to the previous movie, the 2014 film Stand by Me Doraemon. Directed by Ryūichi Yagi and Takashi Yamazaki, it is primarily inspired by the 2000 short film A Grandmother's Recollections and the 2002 short film The Day When I Was Born. Netflix acquired distribution rights to the film outside of Asia (despite it streaming on Asian Netflix as a non-Netflix Original) and released on the service December 24, 2021.

== Plot ==
The film opens during the events of the previous movie when Nobita is in the day before his wedding with Shizuka, however his future self is seemingly distraught.

After a scolding from his mother, present Nobita grows discouraged and questions his true identity. While searching for a place to hide his exam results, he finds an old teddy bear given by his late grandmother, triggering memories of her. Nobita insists on seeing her, and Doraemon reluctantly agrees.

In the past, they encounter younger versions of Nobita, his friends, and family. By chance, Nobita reunites tearfully with his grandmother, fulfilling her wish to see him during his primary school days. However, she also wishes to see his future bride. They panic when discovering that the future Nobita has apparently run away from the wedding. In the future, present Nobita fills in for his future self during the wedding but leaves midway due to stage fright during his speech. Desperate to find the future Nobita, they discover that the time machine has vanished. Doraemon uses the "Soul Time Machine" to transport Nobita's soul to the past, enabling them to retrieve the time machine and the "Path-Finding Stick". By using the stick, they manage to find the future Nobita who is hiding in the present era. He explains why and how he got to this era and laments that he could have been a better person and that he would be happier if Shizuka forgot he existed entirely. To help him overcome his resentment, Doraemon uses the "Switching Rope", a trial gadget sent to him earlier, to swap the bodies of the two Nobitas. However, a salesperson from the future then arrives telling them that if they are not switched back within one hour, their memories would be erased permanently.

In a panic, the present Nobita (in future Nobita's body) and Doraemon search for future Nobita (in present Nobita's body). Future Nobita in the meantime, encounters Shizuka but gets into a fight with older bullies, in which he uses a motorcycle to escape. While attempting to fight them, he consistently fades in and out of consciousness, letting him dodge multiple punches. But his friends join in and eventually defeat the bullies. Both Nobitas then go unconscious, worrying about both his friends and Doraemon. Doraemon then uses the "Anywhere Door" to go to the present switch both of their souls, preventing their memories from being erased. Future Nobita then finally realizes the reason why Shizuka truly likes him and decides it is time to return home but not before going to the day of his birth, where they learn about the meaning of their name.

They all return to the wedding venue, where present Nobita and Doraemon bid farewell to future Nobita. Future Nobita delivers a heartfelt speech referencing his recent experiences and notices his past self with his crying grandmother observing the wedding. He then confesses to a confused Shizuka that Doraemon has saved him for one final time.

Back during the time his grandmother is alive, she points out the strengths Nobita has and Nobita bursts into tears listening. They part ways and return to the time machine. In a pretend fight, Nobita is accidentally hit with the "Forgetting Stick," causing him to forget most of the day's events. Doraemon decides it is better to keep it that way and assures Nobita that his grandmother's wish will be fulfilled.

During the end credits, many points of Nobita's past and future life and the events on the current day it takes place in are seen with the final one showing a frame of him with his grandmother and him with Shizuka.

== Cast ==
Character	Japanese voice actor	English voice actor
Doraemon	Wasabi Mizuta	Mona Marshall
Nobita Nobi	Megumi Ōhara Satoshi Tsumabuki^{O} Eito Kawahara^{Y} Rakuya Moriya ^{B}	Johnny Yong Bosch Vedanten Naidoo^{Y}
Shizuka Nobi (née Minamoto)	Yumi Kakazu	Cassandra Lee Morris
Suneo Honekawa	Tomokazu Seki	Brian Beacock
Takeshi "Gian" Gōda	Subaru Kimura	Kaiji Tang
Tamako Nobi (Nobita's mother)	Kotono Mitsuishi	Dorah Fine
Nobisuke Nobi (Nobita's father)	Yasunori Matsumoto	Tony Oliver
Naka Meguro	Bakarhythm	Kyle Hebert
Dekisugi Hidetoshi	Shihoko Hagino	Spike Spencer
Yoshio Minamoto (Shizuka's father)	Aruno Tahara	Doug Stone
Michiko Minamoto (Shizuka's mother)	Ai Orikasa	Wendee Lee
Jaiko Gōda	Vanilla Yamazaki	Minae Noji
Various characters	Junichi Nakajima	Richard Johnson

== Release ==
It was originally scheduled to release in theaters on 7 August 2020. However, due to the COVID-19 pandemic, the film was temporarily removed from the release schedule, and was replaced by Doraemon: Nobita's New Dinosaur (which had been postponed from a previous March release). The film was then postponed to November 20, 2020, when it was given a theatrical release in Japan. The film was released in Indonesia on February 19, 2021, and in Malaysia on March 5, 2021 Netflix released an English dub in Japan on November 6, 2021, featuring the cast of Bang Zoom! Entertainment's English dub of the 2005 anime reprising their roles. Netflix also released the English, Japanese and Hindi dubs worldwide on December 24, 2021.

== Soundtrack ==
The theme song "Niji" is performed by Masaki Suda.

== Box office ==
Debuting on 416 screens with limitations on seating capacity due to COVID-19 pandemic, Stand by Me Doraemon 2 earned $3.7 million on 305,000 admissions in its first weekend and ranked number-two on Japanese box office.

Here is a table which shows the box office of this movie of all the weekends in Japan:

#	Rank	Weekend	Weekend gross	Total gross till current weekend
1	2	21–November 22	¥386,000,000 ($3.7 million)	¥451,000,000 ($4.3 million)
2	2	28–November 29	¥294,477,450 ($2.8 million)	¥1,108,062,500 ($10.6 million)
3	3	5–December 6	¥244,864,350 ($2.4 million)	¥1,498,402,100 ($14.4 million)
4	3	12–December 13	¥186,101,750 ($1.8 million)	¥1,790,491,100 ($17.2 million)
5	5	19–December 20	¥118,872,850 ($1.1 million)	¥1,986,991,900 ($19.1 million)
6	5	26–December 27	¥75,631,700 ($730,000)	¥2,150,941,650 ($20.7 million)
7	6	2–January 3	¥85,842,350 ($833,000)	¥2,433,882,750 ($23.6 million)
8	9	9–January 10	¥34,988,600 ($335,000)	¥2,572,688,550 ($24.9 million)
9	8	16–January 17	¥24,880,300 ($240,000)	¥2,631,770,200 ($25.4 million)
10	8	23–January 24	¥25,533,850 ($246,000)	¥2,667,298,050 ($25.8 million)
Final Total	-	-	-	¥2.78 billion ($26.6 million)

== Accolades ==
Awards
Year	Award	Category	Recipients and nominees	Result	Ref.
2021	44th Japan Academy Prize	Animation of the Year	Stand by Me Doraemon 2	Nominated	
