= Tomato Akai =

Japanese voice actress (born March 16)

- あかい とまと
- Born: March 16; Tokyo, Japan
- Occupation: Voice actress
- Years active: 1997–2008
- Notable credits: Doraemon as Mini-Dora

Tomato Akai (あかい とまと, Akai Tomato; born March 16) is a former Japanese voice actress from Tokyo.

She is known for being the first voice actress of Mini-Dora in the 2005 Doraemon television series.

== Biography ==
Akai was born in Tokyo, Japan on March 16.

When she was in elementary school, she started listening to the radio because of my older brother’s influence, inspiring her to become a voice actress.

There was a time where she wanted to become a manga artist alongside being a voice actress, and she would submit her own illustrations to anime magazines, though gave up due to being unable to come up with a story.

She then went to a vocational school where she met Shigeru Chiba.

== Personal life ==
Her personal hobbies are confectionery and strolling, with her special skills being nihon-buyō and stage combat.

Her motto is "jūnin toiro".

She was the original voice actress of Doraemon character Mini-Dora in the Doraemon television anime series from 2005 until she left the role in 2009.

In a 2010 interview, in regards about her future, she said, "I want to help children grow up happy and healthy..." and also shared her dream of working on an educational TV show.

== Filmography ==
=== Television animation ===
List of voice performances in television animation
Year	Title	Role	Notes	Source
1999	Kuu The Animation	Little Bird		
2001	Sister Princess	Girl B		
2003	The Galaxy Railways	Ai Matsuura, Child Passenger		
2005	Basilisk: The Kōga Ninja Scrolls	Iga Clan Member, Kasumi Gyoubu (young), Takechiyo	Iga Clan Member in Ep. 1, Takechiyo in Ep. 18	
2005	Doraemon	Mini-Dora, Cameron (camera), Girl A	First voice of Mini-Dora	
2006	Kirarin Revolution	Shinonome Academy Student, Tabernger Pink, Komachi, Girl		
2006	The Galaxy Railways: Crossroads to Eternity	Ai Matsuura, Child Passenger	Child Passenger in Ep. 4	
2009	Gokujō!! Mecha Mote Iinchō	Chieri Kimura		

=== Original video animation (OVA) ===
List of voice performances in original video animation
Year	Title	Role	Notes	Source
1999	Mystery of the Necronomicon	Amy McDowell	Ep. 3-4	
2003	Guardian Hearts	Hina's Friend	Ep. 1-2	
2004	Memories Off 3.5: Inori no Todoku Toki	Female Student		
2005	Guardian Hearts! Power UP!	Fritillaria	Ep. 2	

=== Video games ===
List of voice performances in video games
Year	Title	Role	Platform	Source
2007	Doraemon Wii: Secret Tool King Tournament	Mini-Dora	Wii	
2007	KuruKuru Princess: Yume no White Quartet	Mayuri Shiratori	Nintendo DS	
2008	Doraemon: Nobita and the Green Giant Legend DS	Mini-Dora	Nintendo DS	

=== Drama CD ===
- Quintet! (2008) - Yuriko Akamine

=== Dubbing ===
- Zentrix (2003) - Blue-chan, Cheeky (Ep. 4)
