= Miki Ito =

Miki Itō may refer to:

- Miki Ito (footballer) (伊藤 美紀, born 1995), Japanese professional footballer
- Miki Itō (伊藤 美紀, born 1962), Japanese voice actress and narrator
- Miki Itō (skier) (伊藤 みき, born 1987), Japanese freestyle skier
