= Aruno Tahara =

Japanese voice actor (born 1949)

- 田原 アルノ
- Born: Tomomitsu Ishida (石田 知充); March 23, 1949 (age 77); Tokyo, Japan
- Occupations: Actor; voice actor
- Agent: Mouvement

Aruno Tahara (田原 アルノ, Tahara Aruno) born Tomomitsu Ishida (石田 知充, Ishida Tomomitsu; March 23, 1949) is a Japanese actor and voice actor affiliated with Mouvement.

== Filmography ==
=== Television animation ===
- Cat's Eye (1983) (Domon). *Lady Georgie(1983) ( Additional Voices )
- Dragon Quest: The Adventure of Dai (1991) (Baduck)
- YuYu Hakusho (1992) (Risho)
- Magical Circle Guru Guru (1994) (Bajāni)
- Hikaru no Go (2002) (Mr. Shu)
- One Piece (2003) (Ben Beckman (2nd voice), Masira)
- Death Note (2006) (David Hoope)
- The Story of Saiunkoku (2007) (Dr. Yō)

=== ONA ===
- Resident Evil: Infinite Darkness (2021) (Wilson)

=== OVA ===
- Mobile Suit Gundam 0083: Stardust Memory (1991) (Adamski Harida)
- Legend of the Galactic Heroes (1992) (Grünemann)

=== Theatrical animation ===
- Dorami-chan: Mini Dora SOS!!! (1989) (Announcer)
- Mobile Suit Gundam II: Soldiers of Sorrow (2000) (Seki)
- Stand by Me Doraemon (2014) (Yoshio Minamoto)
- Stand by Me Doraemon 2 (2020) (Yoshio Minamoto)
- One Piece Film: Red (2022) (Ben Beckman)

=== Video games ===
- Langrisser (????) (Hawkings)
- Rogue Galaxy (????) (Burton Willis, Yuvan)
- Skylanders: Spyro's Adventure (????) (Rizzo)
- Skylanders: Giants (????) (Rizzo)

=== Tokusatsu ===
- Choukou Senshi Changéríon (????) (Kuuretsuki)

=== Web animation ===
- Megumi (????) (Administration official)

=== Dubbing roles ===
==== Live-action ====
- John Kassir
  - Tales from the Crypt (The Crypt Keeper)
  - Tales from the Crypt: Demon Knight (The Crypt Keeper)
  - Tales from the Crypt: Bordello of Blood (The Crypt Keeper)
  - Tales from the Crypt Presents: Ritual (The Crypt Keeper)
- Jeffrey Tambor
  - There's Something About Mary (Sully)
  - The Hangover (Sid Garner)
  - The Hangover Part II (Sid Garner)
  - The Hangover Part III (Sid Garner)
- Alien 3 (Walter Golic (Paul McGann))
- America's Sweethearts (Dave Kingman (Stanley Tucci))
- Babylon A.D. (Dr. Arthur Darquandier (Lambert Wilson))
- Billy Madison (Eric Gordon (Bradley Whitford))
- Black Christmas (Professor Gelson (Cary Elwes))
- Blue Steel (Robber (Tom Sizemore))
- Bound (Shelly (Barry Kivel))
- Bulworth (Graham Crockett (Paul Sorvino))
- Commando (1989 TV Asashi edition) (Henriques (Charles Meshack))
- Cube (David Worth (David Hewlett))
- Dae Jang Geum (Yeonsangun of Joseon)
- Eastern Condors (Lung Yeung (Haing S. Ngor))
- Everwood (Doctor Abbott (Tom Amandes))
- Exit Wounds (2004 NTV edition) (Vice President (Christopher Lawford))
- Fantastic Beasts: The Secrets of Dumbledore (Anton Vogel (Oliver Masucci))
- Fargo (V.M. Varga (David Thewlis))
- Final Destination (2002 TV Asahi edition) (Ken Browning (Robert Wisden))
- The Frighteners (Special Agent Milton Dammers (Jeffrey Combs))
- The Godfather (2001 DVD and 2008 Blu-ray editions) (Tom Hagen (Robert Duvall))
- The Godfather Part II (2001 DVD and 2008 Blu-ray editions) (Tom Hagen (Robert Duvall))
- Homicide: Life on the Street (John Munch (Richard Belzer))
- The Hunt for Red October (Skip Tyler (Jeffrey Jones))
- John Q. (Lester Matthews (Eddie Griffin))
- Last Christmas (Ivan Andrich (Boris Isaković))
- The Legend of Tarzan (The British Prime Minister (Jim Broadbent))
- Lucky Stars Go Places (Sandy (Richard Ng))
- Milk Money (Waltzer (Malcolm McDowell))
- Mission: Impossible (William Donloe (Rolf Saxon))
- Mission: Impossible 2 (2006 TV Asahi edition) (Billy Baird (John Polson))
- The Mummy (Jonathan Carnahan (John Hannah))
- The Mummy Returns (Jonathan Carnahan (John Hannah))
- The Mummy: Tomb of the Dragon Emperor (Jonathan Carnahan (John Hannah))
- New Fist of Fury (Hung (Han Ying-chieh))
- Nineteen Eighty-Four (Syme (James Walker))
- Ocean's Twelve (2007 NTV edition) (Livingston Dell (Eddie Jemison))
- Pay It Forward (Eugene Simonet (Kevin Spacey))
- Platoon (1998 DVD edition) (Sergeant O'Neill (John C. McGinley))
- Platoon (1989 TV Asahi edition) (Doc)
- The Protector (Superintendent Whitehead)
- Pushing Daisies (Narrator (Jim Dale))
- The Rink (Her Father (James T. Kelley))
- Road to Perdition (Alexander Rance (Dylan Baker))
- The Rock (2000 TV Asahi edition) (Captain Hendrix (John C. McGinley))
- The Saint (Dr. Lev Naumovich Botkin (Henry Goodman))
- The Sentinel (President John Ballentine (David Rasche))
- The Siege (Frank Haddad (Tony Shalhoub))
- Six Feet Under (George Sibley (James Cromwell))
- Sniper 2 (Pavel)
- Stargate SG-1 (Apophis (Peter Williams))
- S.W.A.T. (Captain II Tom Fuller (Larry Poindexter))
- Taxi Driver (Senator Charles Palantine (Leonard Harris))
- Teenage Mutant Ninja Turtles II: The Secret of the Ooze (Phil)
- Thunderbirds (Parker (Ron Cook))
- Ultraman: The Ultimate Hero (Dada)
- Vacancy (Mason (Frank Whaley))
- Vacancy 2: The First Cut (Gordon (David Moscow))
- White Squall (McCrea (John Savage))

==== Animation ====
- Batman: The Animated Series (Arkady Duvall)
- G.I. Joe: The Movie (Beachhead)
- Cars 3 (River Scott)
- Rango (Señor Flan)
- Toonsylvania (Dr. Vic Frankenstein)

== Awards ==
Year	Award	Category	Result	Ref.
2026	20th Seiyu Awards	Merit Award	Honored	
