= Yasunori Matsumoto =

Japanese actor and voice actor

- 松本 保典
- Born: Matsudo, Japan
- Other names: Yassan (やっさん); Macchan (まっちゃん); Matsu (まつ); Hoten (ほてん)
- Education: Chuo University
- Occupations: Actor; voice actor; stage actor; narrator
- Years active: 1987–present
- Agent: Sigma Seven
- Height: 170 cm (5 ft 7 in)
- Spouse: Junko Sakuma

Yasunori Matsumoto (松本 保典, Matsumoto Yasunori) is a Japanese actor and voice actor affiliated with Sigma Seven. Some of Matsumoto's most notable roles are Wataru Akiyama in Initial D, Jean Havoc in Fullmetal Alchemist, Magnum Ace in Shippū! Iron Leaguer, Gourry Gabriev in Slayers and Ryo Hibiki in Sonic Soldier Borgman. His wife was voice actress Junko Sakuma, who died in March 2011.

== Career ==
Matsumoto graduated from the Department of Political Science, Faculty of Law, Chuo University after graduating from Yakuendai High School. He used to be a member of Production Baobab. He was also the vice-chairman of Sugoroku, a theater company led by Kenichi Ogata, and became the chairperson after Ogata retired. He later left the company in 2016.

When Matsumoto was a student, he was the captain of a cycle racing club, and has even participated in the National Athletic Meet. However, he left the club due to a back injury. Originally a science fiction enthusiast, he was a science major until he was in high school. However, after watching a political program on TV at some point, he became interested in the world's developments and entered the Department of Political Science in the Faculty of Law at Chuo University with the intention of becoming a bureaucrat. Although he hoped to pursue a career related to politics, he was faced with a harsh reality and spent his school days lost in his career path.

In the midst of all this, Matsumoto was impressed by the movie The Sound of Music, and since all of his friends at the boarding house were film buffs, he decided to become a film production staff member. However, when he graduated from university, the Japanese film industry was in a state of downsizing and there were not many good opportunities for staff, and unlike today, there were few production companies, so the road to film production was difficult. He decided to join a theatrical troupe, hoping to become staff after getting into the world of actors first. When he was about to graduate, a friend of his introduced him to Theater Company Garakuta Kōbō (now Sugoroku), which was recruiting, and he entered the affiliated training school as a fourth-year student.

Although he did not have much experience in voice work, when he went to observe a studio that was recording the voice actors' dubbing, he was surprised to see how all the cast members at the scene watched the footage only once on the spot and recorded it immediately, although nowadays actors receive rehearsal materials in advance. When he borrowed the script and watched the performance, his eyes could not keep up with the speed of the performers' work, and he couldn't follow where they were at. After that, he had several auditions for voice work, but had no idea what work he was auditioning for. In the midst of that, he was told to read a manuscript according to the feeling of an artwork he was shown, and when he did, he passed his first audition. That was to be his debut work, the anime TV series Manga Nihon Keizai Nyūmon.

== Filmography ==
=== Anime television ===
1987

- Kimagure Orange Road – Mitsuru Hayakawa
- Manga Nihon Keizai Nyumon – Tsuchida
- Mister Ajikko – Shougo

1988

- Yoroiden Samurai Troopers – Cale (Yami Mashou Anubis)
- Starship Troopers – Johnny Rico
- Sonic Soldier Borgman – Ryo Hibiki

1989

- Tenku Senki Shurato – Fudo Myo-o Acalantha
- Idol Densetsu Eriko – Shogo Ohgi

1990

- Brave Exkaiser – Shuntarou
- Idol Angel Yokoso Yoko – Yutaka Tokudaiji
- Karasu Tengu Kabuto – Kabuto
- Idol Tenshi Yokoso Yoko – Yutaka
- RPG Densetsu Hepoi – Michael
- Samurai Pizza Cats – Zankaa

1991

- The Brave Fighter of Sun Fighbird – Yutaro Katori/Fighbird
- Future GPX Cyber Formula – Hiroyuki Kazami (young)
- Romance of the Three Kingdoms – Cao Cao

1992

- Tekkaman Blade – Noal Vereuse
- Ashita e Free Kick – Tachibana Daichi
- Cooking Papa – Tatsuya Kimura
- Flower Witch Mary Bell – Jeat
- Nangoku Shounen Papuwa-kun – Umigishi-kun
- Tekkaman Blade – Noal Vereuse

1993

- YuYu Hakusho – Toya
- The Brave Express Might Gaine – Black Gaine/Black Might Gaine
- Shippu! Iron Leaguer – Magnum Ace

1994

- Haō Taikei Ryū Knight – Tsukimi
- Tottemo! Luckyman – Lucky Star

1995

- Slayers – Gourry Gabriev
- H2 – Fujio Koga
- Kuma no Putaro – Conductor
- Kyoryu Boukenki Jura Tripper – Mosaru
- Mojacko – Ume-san
- Ninku – Basara Ninku
- Soar High! Isami – Mitsukuni
- Street Fighter II V – Tyler (eps 3–4)
- Virtua Fighter – Jacky Bryant

1996

- VS Knight Ramune & 40 Fire – Narcist Dandy
- B'tX – Zaji
- Case Closed – Takehiko Fujie, Tsuze, Yuuzou
- Kaiketsu Zorro – Teo
- Martian Successor Nadesico – Genpachiro Akiyama
- Midori no Makibao – Amago Wakuchin
- Rurouni Kenshin – Tetsuma Okubo
- Slayers Next – Gourry Gabriev

1997

- Anime Ganbare Goemon – Goemon, Goemon Impact
- Pokémon – Adult Lunick/Adult Kazuki
- Kindaichi Shounen no Jikenbo – Makoto Toujou
- Vampire Princess Miyu – Ryu Shinma
- Vampiyan Kids – Vampire Hunter
- Slayers Try – Gourry Gabriev

1998

- Initial D – Wataru Akiyama
- Lost Universe – Spreader of Darkness
- Silent Mobius – Ralph Bomerz
- Momoiro Sisters – Shouichi Tanaka
- Nessa no Haoh Gandalla – Yuki Saijoh
- Shadow Skill – Scarface

1999

- Angel Links – Marcotte
- Bucky – The Incredible Kid – En
- Initial D: Second Stage – Wataru Akiyama
- Legend of Himiko – Chosa
- Starship Girl Yamamoto Yohko – Curtis Lawson
- Steel Angel Kurumi – Kamihito Kagara
- Wild Arms: Twilight Venom – Keanu, Kianu Fallwind

2000

- Gravitation – Hiroshi Nakano
- Love Hina – Noriyasu Seta
- Boys Be... – Daisuke Nitta
- Clockwork Fighters Hiwou's War – Kurogane
- Sazae-san – Norisuke Namino
- Vandread – Leader

2001

- Star Ocean EX – Bowman Jean
- Go! Go! Itsutsugo Land – Director (episode 19b)
- Hellsing – Boz
- Hero Hero-kun – Hero Hero-Papa
- Offside – Kazuhito Oda
- A Little Snow Fairy Sugar – Paul
- Zone of the Enders – Joey

2002

- Get Backers – Wan Paul
- Princess Tutu – Neko-sensei
- Twelve Kingdoms – Kantai
- MÄR – Galian
- Atashin'chi – Sport's Teacher (First)
- Pokémon Advance – Kinya's Gold Usokki, Umezu
- Getbackers – Paul Wang
- Ghost in the Shell: Stand Alone Complex – Policeman
- Mirage of Blaze – Shuhei Chiaki
- Mobile Suit Gundam Seed – Haruma Yamato
- Naruto – Postman Ninja
- Cheeky Angel – Hosoi, Yanagisawa

2003

- Croquette! – Worcester
- E's Otherwise – Yuuki Tokugawa
- F-Zero Falcon Densetsu – Beast-Man
- Fullmetal Alchemist – Dolcetto, Jean Havoc
- Maburaho – Shunji Kamishiro
- Mermaid Forest – Eijiro (60 years ago), Fisherman
- Rumiko Takahashi Anthology – Keiichi, Ruriko Tonegawa's husband, Takanezawa, Yoshio Hirooka
- Sou Nanda – Chairman (ep 6)
- Wolf's Rain – Horse (ep 20)

2004

- Paranoia Agent – Zebra
- Agatha Christie no Meitantei Poirot to Marple – Franklin Clarke
- Black Jack – Kyuuma
- Futari wa Pretty Cure – Juna
- Initial D: Fourth Stage – Wataru Akiyama
- Kannazuki no Miko – Tsubasa
- Kyo kara Maoh! – Raven
- The Melody of Oblivion – Lucky Thoroughbred
- Midori Days – Masami Kyomoto
- Otogi Zoshi – Shuten Doji
- Phoenix – Inugami Harima (Sun Chapter)
- Rockman.EXE Stream – Charlie Airstar
- Space Symphony Maetel—Galaxy Express 999 Side Story – Ra Frankenbach Leopard
- The Moon is East, The Sun is West: Operation Sanctuary – Fukano

2005

- Doraemon – Nobisuke Nobi
- Zoids Genesis – Major Zailin
- Eureka Seven – Stoner
- Gallery Fake – Jun Sekine
- Trinity Blood – Virgin Walsh
- GUNxSWORD – Joe
- Guyver: The Bioboosted Armor – Archanfel
- Rockman.EXE Beast – Charlie Airstar

2006

- Black Jack 21 – Bill Budd
- Le Chevalier D'Eon – Earl St. Germain
- The Familiar of Zero – Count Mott
- Ginga Tetsudo Monogatari: Eien e no Bunkiten – Yurihi
- Hataraki Man – Shimura
- Hell Girl: Two Mirrors – Eiichi Kurebayashi
- Lovege Chu – Miracle Seiyu Hakuso – Hisatoki Edogawa
- Pumpkin Scissors – Messenger (episode 16)
- Higurashi When They Cry – Ichiro Maebara
- Zegapain – Kurashige

2007

- Darker Than Black – Gai Kurasawa
- Mobile Suit Gundam 00 – Alejandro Corner
- Koutetsu Sangokushi – Sonsaku Hakufu
- Naruto: Shippuden – Ganryu and Kizashi Haruno
- Deltora Quest – King Endon
- Ghost Hound – Takahito Komagusa
- Higurashi no Naku Koroni Kai – Ichirou Maebara
- Kaiji – Furuhata
- Les Miserables – Shoujo Cosette – Famuyu
- Mobile Suit Gundam 00 – Alejandro Corner
- Princess Resurrection – Pharaoh (ep12)
- Pururun! Shizuku-chan! – Chirikarareddo
- Shion no Oh – Shinji Yasuoka
- Terra e... – Jomy's father

2008

- Slayers Revolution – Gourry Gabriev
- Soul Eater – Captain Nidhogg
- Gunslinger Girl: II Teatrino – European pole Bureau Chief
- Natsume's Book of Friends – Tanuma's Father
- Yes! PreCure 5 GoGo! – King Donuts
- Real Drive – Shozo Kominato
- Sands of Destruction – Cat Master (ep 1)
- Tales of the Abyss – Guy Cecil
- Yatterman – Kogoro Dokechi

2009

- Darker than Black: Gemini of the Meteor – Gai Kurasawa
- Fresh Pretty Cure! – Wester
- Kobato. – Sotaro Mori
- Slayers Evolution-R – Gourry Gabriev

2010

- Heroman – Doctor Minami
- Pokémon: Black and White – Cliff (ep 46)
- Psychic Detective Yakumo – Genichiro Sakakibara
- Showa Monogatari – Yuzo Yamazaki

2011

- Blade (Ikeda)
- Ground Control to Psychoelectric Girl – Yamamoto-san

2012

- Bodacious Space Pirates – Kenjo Kurihara
- Eureka Seven – Stoner
- Initial D Fifth Stage – Wataru Akiyama
- Magi: The Labyrinth of Magic – Balkak
- Saint Seiya Omega – Hound Miguel

2013

- Monogatari Series Second Season – Mayoi's Father (ep 8)

2014

- Aikatsu! – Encierro Atsuji

2015

- JoJo's Bizarre Adventure: Stardust Crusaders – Anubis
- Go! Princess Precure – Ibuki Haruno
- Rampo Kitan: Game of Laplace – Namikoshi's Father
- Yatterman Night – Beane

2017

- Altair: A Record of Battles – Doge Donatello Doria

2019

- Attack on Titan – Eren Kruger

2021

- SK8 the Infinity – Joe

2023

- MF Ghost – Wataru Akiyama

2025

- Anne Shirley – Matthew Cuthbert

2026

- An Adventurer's Daily Grind at Age 29 – Cockdole
- High School! Kimengumi – Gorō Mutsu
- The Salty Koharu Has a Soft Spot for Me – Seizaemon Oshio
- Cyberpunk: Edgerunners 2 – Kiril Yang

Unknown date

- Lady Blue – Kyoshiro
- Urotsukidoji – Takeaki and Buju
- Elven Bride – Kenji
- Growlanser III: The Dual Darkness – Kenneth Leymon
- Puyo Puyo~n – Schezo Wegey
- NG Knight Ramune & 40 – Queen Cideron

=== Original video animation (OVA) ===
- Metal Skin Panic MADOX-01 (1987) – Kouji Sugimoto
- Armor Hunter Mellowlink (1988) – Mellowlink Arity
- Starship Troopers (1989) – Jullian Rico
- Captain Tsubasa (1989) – Louis Napoleon
- Mōryō Senki Madara (1991) – Kaos
- RG Veda (1991) – Kujaku
- Adventure Kid (1992) – Kazuya
- Kuro no Shishi (1992) – Shishimaru
- Idol Defense Force Hummingbird (1993) – Shunsaku Kudo
- Please Save My Earth (1993) – Shukaido
- Kyou Kara Ore Wa!! (1994) – Takahashi Mitsuhashi
- Sonic the Hedgehog (1996) – Knuckles the Echidna
- Shinesman (1996) – Hiroya Matsumoto / Shinesman Red

=== Anime films ===
- Sonic Soldier Borgman: Last Battle – (1989) – Ryo Hibiki
- Heavy – (1990) – Guy Hyuga
- Sonic Soldier Borgman: Lover's Rain – (1990) – Ryo Hibiki
- Chibi Maruko-chan: My Favorite Song (1992) – Ryo Sato
- Urotsukidoji II: Legend of the Demon Womb – (1993) – Takeaki Kiryu
- Darkside Blues – (1994) – Tatsuya
- Elementalors – (1995) – Shiohisa
- Legend of Crystania – (1995) – Borks
- Ninku the Movie – (1995) – Basara/Kisumi
- Kimagure Orange Road: Summer's Beginning – (1996) – Mitsuru Hayakawa
- Pipi to Benai Hotaru – (1996) – Kira
- Jungle Emperor Leo – (1997) – Ramune
- Doraemon: Nobita and the Winged Braves – (2001) – Babylon
- Slayers Premium – (2001) – Gourry Gabriev
- Guilstein – (2002) – Chous Distour
- Inuyasha the Movie: Swords of an Honorable Ruler – (2003) – Setsuna no Takemaru
- Fullmetal Alchemist the Movie: Conqueror of Shamballa – (2005) – Jean Havoc
- Doraemon: Nobita's Dinosaur 2006 (2006) – Nobita's Dad
- Doraemon: Nobita's New Great Adventure into the Underworld (2007) – Nobita's Dad
- Doraemon: Nobita and the Green Giant Legend (2008) – Nobita's Dad
- Doraemon the Movie: Nobita's Spaceblazer (2009) – Nobita's Dad
- Eureka Seven: Pocketful of Rainbows – (2009) – Stoner
- Doraemon: Nobita's Great Battle of the Mermaid King (2010) – Nobita's Dad
- Mobile Suit Gundam 00 the Movie: A Wakening of the Trailblazer (2010) – Alejandro Corner
- Doraemon: Nobita and the New Steel Troops—Winged Angels (2011) – Nobita's Dad
- Pretty Cure All Stars DX3: Deliver the Future! The Rainbow-Colored Flower That Connects the World – (2011) – Black Hole
- Showa Monogatari – (2011) – Yuzo Yamazaki
- Doraemon: Nobita and the Island of Miracles—Animal Adventure (2012) – Nobita's Dad
- Doraemon: New Nobita's Great Demon—Peko and the Exploration Party of Five – (2014) – Nobita's Dad
- Stand By Me Doraemon (2014) – Nobita's Dad
- Doraemon: Nobita and the Birth of Japan 2016 (2016) – Nobita's Dad
- Doraemon the Movie 2017: Great Adventure in the Antarctic Kachi Kochi (2017) – Nobita's Dad
- Doraemon the Movie: Nobita's Treasure Island (2018) – Nobita's Dad
- Doraemon: Nobita's Chronicle of the Moon Exploration (2019) – Nobita's Dad
- My Hero Academia: Heroes Rising (2019) – Mahoro and Katsuma's Father
- Doraemon: Nobita's New Dinosaur (2020) – Nobita's Dad
- Stand by Me Doraemon 2 (2020) – Nobita's Dad
- Doraemon: Nobita's Sky Utopia (2023) – Nobita's Dad
- Doraemon: Nobita's Earth Symphony (2024) – Nobita's Dad

=== Tokusatsu ===
- Tensou Sentai Goseiger (2010) – Hognlo Alien Powereddark of the Mutation (ep 13)
- Tokumei Sentai Go-Busters (2012) – Danganloid (ep 10)
- Ressha Sentai ToQger (2014) – Type Shadow (ep 10)
- Ultraman X (2015) – Narration, Alien Fanton Guruman
- Ultraman X The Movie (2016) – Narration, Alien Fanton Guruman

=== Video games ===
- Logos Panic (1995)
- Brave Saga series (1998-2005) – Yutaro Katori/Fighbird, Black Gaine/Black MightGaine
- Initial D Arcade Stage series (????–??) – Wataru Akiyama
- Kingdom Hearts, Kingdom Hearts II, and Kingdom Hearts Re:Coded (Kingdom Hearts HD 2.5 Remix) (2002, 2005, 2014) – Hercules
- Tales of the Abyss (2005) – Guy Cecil
- Mobile Suit Gundam SEED: Owaranai Ashita e (2006) – Edward Harrelson
- Rockman X4 (Mega Man X4) (1997) – Double
- Tengai Makyou: Fuuun Kabuki Den (????) – Karune
- Super Robot Wars Original Generations series (????–??) – Folka Albark
- Super Robot Wars Series (????–??) – Alejandro Corner, Doctor Minami, Black Gaine/Black MightGaine
- Resident Evil: Revelations (2012) – Raymond Vester
- Gundam Breaker 3 (2016) – Robo-ta

=== Drama CD ===
- Abunai Series 2: Abunai Summer Vacation – Yoshiaki Sawatari
- Abunai Series 5: Abunai Shiawase Chou Bangaihen – Yoshiaki Sawatari, Chief, Kyou Sakuranomiya & Midori-san
- Abunai Series side story 1: Abunai Ura Summer Vacation – Yoshiaki Sawatari
- Analyst no Yuutsu series 1: Benchmark ni Koi wo Shite – Yoshio Kawaguchi
- Boku no Gingitsune – Takayuki Watanabe
- C Kara Hajimaru Koi mo Ii – Takatsugu Oda, Tadanori
- Endless series 1: Endless Rain – Atsui Katou
- Endless series 3: Endless Love – Atsui Katou
- Gin no Requiem – Dylan
- Gohan wo Tabeyou series 1, 2, 4–6 – Kaiou Hishida
- Mayonaka ni Oai Shimashou – Yamabuki Kaidouji
- Mirage of Blaze series 1: Mahoroba no Ryuujin – Shuuhei Chiaki
- Mirage of Blaze series 4: Washi yo, Tarega Tameni Tobu – Shuuhei Chiaki
- Mou Ichido Only You – Taniguchi
- Muteki na Bokura Series 1 – Kaoru Tachibana
- Muteki na Bokura Series 2: Oogami Datte Kowakunai – Kaoru Tachibana
- Muteki na Bokura Series 3: Shoubu wa Korekara! – Kaoru Tachibana
- Muteki na Bokura Series 4: Saikyou na Yatsura – Kaoru Tachibana
- Muteki na Bokura Series side story 1: Aitsu ni Muchuu – Kaoru Tachibana
- My Sexual Harassment series 1 – Junya Mochizuki
- Osananajimi – Takeda
- Pretty Baby 1 – Touru Makihara
- Shosen Kedamono Series 1: Shosen Kedamono – Tsukasa Muromachi
- Shosen Kedamono Series 2: Youko Nitsumaru – Tsukasa Muromachi
- Shosen Kedamono Series 3: Ryuuou no Hanayome – Tsukasa Muromachi
- Shosen Kedamono Series side story 2: Souko Gekka ni Hohoemu – elder Souko/Red Hair

=== Dubbing ===
==== Live-action ====
- Adam Sandler
  - Reign Over Me – Dr. Charlie Fineman
  - Jack and Jill – Jack Sadelstein
  - Just Go with It – Dr. Daniel "Danny" Maccabee
  - That's My Boy – Donald 'Donny' Berger
  - Grown Ups 2 – Lenny Feder
- David Arquette
  - RPM – Luke Delson
  - See Spot Run – Gordon Smith
  - Eight Legged Freaks – Chris McCormick
  - Riding the Bullet – George Staub
- Ryan Reynolds
  - Green Lantern – Hal Jordan
  - Safe House – Matt Weston
  - R.I.P.D. – Nick Walker
  - The Voices – Jerry Hickfang
- 1492: Conquest of Paradise – Diego Columbus (Juan Diego Botto)
- 200 Cigarettes – Kevin (Paul Rudd)
- 54 – Greg Randazzo (Breckin Meyer)
- 8 Heads in a Duffel Bag – Charlie Pritchett (Andy Comeau)
- The Absent-Minded Professor – Biff Hawk (Tommy Kirk)
- Addicted to Love – Sam (Matthew Broderick)
- Aliens – Private Spunkmeyer (Daniel Kash)
- Almost Famous – Ben Fong-Torres (Terry Chen)
- Anaconda (1999 TV Asashi edition) – Gary Dixon (Owen Wilson)
- Armageddon (2002 Fuji TV edition) – Oscar Choice (Owen Wilson)
- Assassins – Bob (Reed Diamond)
- Atomic Twister – Deputy Jake Hannah (Mark-Paul Gosselaar)
- Babel – Richard Jones (Brad Pitt)
- Backdraft – Washington (Richard Lexsee)
- Bad Education – Paca/Paquito (Javier Cámara)
- Ballistic: Ecks vs. Sever – Agent Harry Lee (Terry Chen)
- Battlestar Galactica – Lieutenant Starbuck (Dirk Benedict)
- Beethoven – Brad Wilson (David Duchovny)
- The Benchwarmers – Gus Matthews (Rob Schneider)
- The Bible: In the Beginning... – Abel (Franco Nero)
- Blossom – Anthony "Tony" Russo (Michael Stoyanov)
- Boogie Nights – Eddie Adams/Dirk Diggler (Mark Wahlberg)
- The Bridge – Marco Ruiz (Demián Bichir)
- Broken Arrow – Captain Riley Hale (Christian Slater)
- The 'Burbs – Ray Peterson (Tom Hanks)
- Center Stage – Cooper Nielson (Ethan Stiefel)
- Chicago Hope – Billy Kronk (Peter Berg)
- CODA – Bernardo "Mr. V" Villalobos (Eugenio Derbez)
- Cool Runnings – Derice Bannock (Leon Robinson)
- Cradle 2 the Grave – Ling (Mark Dacascos)
- Curse of the Starving Class – Wesley Tate (Henry Thomas)
- Dark Angel – Det. Matt Sung (Byron Mann)
- Dark Skies – John Loengard (Eric Close)
- Damages – Josh Reston (Matthew Davis)
- Dead Poets Society – Todd Anderson (Ethan Hawke)
- Dear Eleanor – Bob Potter (Luke Wilson)
- Death Kiss – Dan Forthright (Daniel Baldwin)
- Detention: The Siege at Johnson High – Jason Copeland (Ricky Schroder)
- The Distinguished Gentleman – Arthur Reinhardt (Grant Shaud)
- Enemy of the State – David Pratt (Barry Pepper)
- Eternal Sunshine of the Spotless Mind – Joel Barish (Jim Carrey)
- Fever Pitch – Ben Wrightman (Jimmy Fallon)
- Final Destination 2 – Officer Thomas Burke (Michael Landes)
- Finding Forrester – Massie (Glenn Fitzgerald)
- The Flintstones in Viva Rock Vegas – Chip Rockefeller (Thomas Gibson)
- Flirting with Disaster – Tony Kent (Josh Brolin)
- Frankenstein's Army – Dmitri (Alexander Mercury)
- Frankie's House – Tim Page (Iain Glen)
- The Freshman – Steve Bushak (Frank Whaley)
- Friday the 13th Part VIII: Jason Takes Manhattan – Sean Robertson (Scott Reeves)
- Fried Green Tomatoes – Buddy Threadgoode (Chris O'Donnell)
- From the Earth to the Moon – Jack Schmitt (Tom Amandes)
- Futuresport – Tremaine "Tre" Ramzey (Dean Cain)
- Gone in 60 Seconds – "Kip" Raines (Giovanni Ribisi)
- Growing Pains – Sandy (Matthew Perry)
- A Guy Thing – Paul Coleman (Jason Lee)
- Hannibal – Matteo (Fabrizio Gifuni)
- Her – Theodore Twombly (Joaquin Phoenix)
- Home Alone 3 – Jack Pruitt (Kevin Kilner)
- Homeward Bound: The Incredible Journey – Chance (Michael J. Fox)
- Homeward Bound II: Lost in San Francisco – Chance (Michael J. Fox)
- I Want You – Martin (Alessandro Nivola)
- The Irrefutable Truth about Demons – Harry Ballard (Karl Urban)
- The Immigrant – Bruno Weiss (Joaquin Phoenix)
- In Bruges – Ray (Colin Farrell)
- Independence Day (1999 TV Asashi edition) – Captain Jimmy Wilder (Harry Connick, Jr.)
- The Intern – Paul Rochester (Ben Pullen)
- Invincible – Keith Grady/Metal (Dominic Purcell)
- Jack – Brian Powell (Brian Kerwin)
- Jarhead – Cpl. Alan Troy (Peter Sarsgaard)
- Jason and the Argonauts – Jason (Jason London)
- Keeping the Faith – Father Brian Kilkenney Finn (Edward Norton)
- Lemony Snicket's A Series of Unfortunate Events – Lemony Snicket (Jude Law)
- Licence to Kill – Truman-Lodge (Anthony Starke)
- Life Goes On – Tyler Benchfield (Tommy Puett)
- London Boulevard – Harry Mitchel (Colin Farrell)
- Lucky Stars Go Places – Japanese Crime Lord Yukio Fushime (Tetsuya Matsui)
- Magnolia – Phil Parma (Philip Seymour Hoffman)
- Martians Go Home – Joe Fledermaus (Dean Devlin)
- Meet Joe Black – Drew (Jake Weber)
- Merlin – Mordred (Jason Done)
- Miami Vice – Det. James "Sonny" Crockett (Colin Farrell)
- Mighty Morphin Power Rangers: The Movie – Rocky DeSantos (Steve Cardenas)
- Mo' Better Blues – Bleek Gilliam (Denzel Washington)
- The Money Pit – Walter Fielding, Jr. (Tom Hanks)
- Mr. Magoo – Waldo Magoo (Matt Keeslar)
- Mr. Robot (season 2) – Mr. Robot (Christian Slater)
- Murder in the First – James Stamphill (Christian Slater)
- Must Love Dogs – Jake Anderson (John Cusack)
- My Cousin Vinny – Stan Rothenstein (Mitchell Whitfield)
- My Super Ex-Girlfriend – Matthew "Matt" Saunders (Luke Wilson)
- Office Christmas Party – Josh Parker (Jason Bateman)
- Once Upon a Time in China – Leung Foon (Yuen Biao)
- One True Thing – Jordan Belzer (Nicky Katt)
- The Others – Mark Gabriel (Gabriel Macht)
- Painted Faces – Teenage Samo (Chung Kam-yuen)
- The Pallbearer – Tom Thompson (David Schwimmer)
- Pegasus – Zhang Chi (Shen Teng)
- Pensacola: Wings of Gold – Lieutenant Wendell 'Cipher' McCray (Rodney Van Johnson)
- Point Break – FBI Agent Alvarez (Julian Reyes)
- Private Practice – Dr. Eric Rodriguez (Cristián de la Fuente)
- The Quick and the Dead – Fee "The Kid" Herod (Leonardo DiCaprio)
- REC – Sergio (Jorge-Yaman Serrano)
- The Returned – Jack Winship (Mark Pellegrino)
- A River Runs Through It – Paul Maclean (Brad Pitt)
- Sabrina – David Larrabee (Greg Kinnear)
- Scream 2 – Derek (Jerry O'Connell)
- seaQuest DSV – Sensor Chief Miguel Ortiz (Marco Sanchez)
- The Sentinel – Blair Sandburg (Garett Maggart)
- Seven – Detective David Mills (Brad Pitt)
- The Sky's On Fire – Racer (Ben Browder)
- Snatch – Tommy (Stephen Graham)
- Stealing Home – Teenage Billy Wyatt (William McNamara)
- Talk to Her – Benigno Martín (Javier Cámara)
- Taxi – Émilien Coutant-Kerbalec (Frédéric Diefenthal)
- Terror Tract segment "Make Me an Offer" – Allen Doyle (David DeLuise)
- The Third Wheel – Stanley (Luke Wilson)
- The Three Stooges – Moe Howard (Chris Diamantopoulos)
- Tremors – Melvin Plug (Robert Jayne)
- U-571 (2004 TV Asashi edition) – Lieutenant Pete Emmett (Jon Bon Jovi)
- The Untouchables – Agent Tony Pagano (John Newton)
- Veronica's Closet – Josh Nicolé Blair (Wallace Langham)
- Warriors – Alan James (Matthew Macfadyen)
- White Fang – Jack Conroy (Ethan Hawke)
- White Fang 2: Myth of the White Wolf – Jack Conroy (Ethan Hawke)
- Wing Commander – Lt. Christopher Blair (Freddie Prinze, Jr.)
- Woman on Top – Toninho Oliveira (Murilo Benício)
- The Wraith – William "Billy" Hankins (Matthew Berry)
- The X-Files – Alex Krycek (Nicholas Lea)
- The Young Riders – Noah Dixon (Don Franklin)

==== Animation ====
- Aladdin – Mozenrath
- Batman: The Animated Series – Dick Grayson/Robin
- Captain Underpants: The First Epic Movie – Principal Krupp/Captain Underpants
- F Is for Family – Frank Murphy
- FernGully: The Last Rainforest – Zak
- Flushed Away – Roddy
- Moominvalley – Moominpappa
- ReBoot – Bob (Fuji TV dub)
- Superman: The Animated Series – Tim Drake/Robin
- The Epic Tales of Captain Underpants – Principal Krupp/Captain Underpants
- Turbo – Turbo
- Up – Dug
  - Carl's Date – Dug
