= Kotono Mitsuishi =

Japanese voice actress (born 1967)

- 三石 琴乃
- Born: December 8, 1967 (age 58); Toda, Saitama Prefecture, Japan
- Occupations: Actress; voice actress; narrator
- Years active: 1989–present
- Notable work: Sailor Moon as Usagi Tsukino/Sailor Moon; Neon Genesis Evangelion as Misato Katsuragi; Revolutionary Girl Utena as Juri Arisugawa; Excel Saga as Excel; Mobile Suit Gundam SEED as Murrue Ramius & Ezalia Jule; Detective Conan as Rena Mizunashi; One Piece as Boa Hancock; One Piece as S-Snake; Suite PreCure as Hummy; Yaiba as Sayaka Mine; Project X Zone 2 as Sheath; Honkai: Star Rail as Jade; Zombie Land Saga as Tae Yamada; Doraemon as Tamako Nobi
- Children: 1
- Website: kotochawan.com

Kotono Mitsuishi (三石 琴乃, Mitsuishi Kotono; born December 8, 1967) is a Japanese actress and narrator. She was affiliated with Arts Vision and Lasley Arrow, but is now freelance. Mitsuishi lived in Nagareyama, Chiba. She graduated from high school and entered the Katsuta Voice Actor's Academy in 1986. She is well known for her roles as Usagi Tsukino in Sailor Moon series, Misato Katsuragi in Neon Genesis Evangelion, Sayaka Mine in Yaiba, Boa Hancock in One Piece, Murrue Ramius, Haro and Narrator in Mobile Suit Gundam SEED and Mobile Suit Gundam SEED DESTINY, Rena Mizunashi in Detective Conan and Mei Mei in Jujutsu Kaisen.

== Early life ==
Kotono Mitsuishi was born on December 8, 1967, in Toda, Saitama Prefecture and raised in Tokyo, Japan. She graduated high school in 1986 and later entered the Katsuta Seiyū Academy. She then debuted as a voice actress in 1989. She is also known for her role of Sailor Moon in the manga and anime series of the same name since 1992. In 2011, she was the voice of Hummy in Suite PreCure.

== Filmography ==
=== Television anime ===
List of voice performances in anime
Year	Title	Role	Notes	Source
1990	Samurai Pizza Cats	Oishi, Okoto		
1990	Mashin Hero Wataru 2			
1990	Idol Angel Yokoso Yoko	Kotono	Episodes 10, 39	
1990	Karasu Tengu Kabuto	Handmaiden		
1991	Goldfish Warning!	Tamiko Umino	Episode 27	
1991	Kinkyu Hasshin Saver Kids	Reporter	Episode 43	
1991	Future GPX Cyber Formula	Asuka Sugo	Also 11, ZERO, SAGA, SIN, Early Days Renewal OVAs	
1991–92	Jankenman	Chokkin	Also Jankenman: Kaijudaikessen OVA	
1991–92	High School Mystery: Gakuen Nanafushigi	Yukari Kawai, female student B		
1991–92	Dear Brother	Female Student A, Student B, Theater Club Student	Episodes 1, 8, 16, 27	
1991–92	Magical Princess Minky Momo: Hold on to Your Dreams	Ma-shika	Episode 7	
1991–92	Genji Tsushin Agedama	Ibuki Heike		
1992–93	Floral Magician Mary Bell	Ribbon, Tap		
1992–93	Sailor Moon	Usagi Tsukino/Sailor Moon	Episodes 1-43 (Tsukino was voiced by Kae Araki in episodes 44–46)	
1992–93	Tetsujin 28-go FX	Ranfa		
1992	Maruboshi Mabo-chan ^{(ja)}	Tsubaki-chan	Episode 14	
1992–94	Tsuyoshi Shikkari Shinasai	Yumi Watanabe		
1993–96	Miracle☆Girls	Mai Motoki	Episode 47	
1993–96	The Irresponsible Captain Tylor	Lt. Kyunghwa Kim	Also OVA	
1993–94	Sailor Moon R	Usagi Tsukino/Sailor Moon	Episodes 51-89 (Tsukino was voiced by Kae Araki in episodes 47–50)	
1993–94	Yaiba	Sayaka Mine		
1993	Nintama Rantaro	Yamaguki, Ayaka		
1993–94	Jungle King Tar-chan	Helen Noguchi		
1994–95	Sailor Moon S	Usagi Tsukino/Sailor Moon		
1994–95	Rai: Galactic Civil War Chronicle/Thunder Jet	Princess Simone		
1994–95	Macross 7	Commander Chlore		
1994–95	Blue Seed	Kome Sawaguchi	Also Blue Seed: Beyond	
1995	Kishin Doji Zenki	Nagi		
1995–96	Sailor Moon SuperS	Usagi Tsukino/Sailor Moon	Also SuperS Plus and Specials	
1995–96	Wedding Peach	Potamos		
1995–96	Neon Genesis Evangelion	Misato Katsuragi		
1996	Bucket de Gohan ^{(ja)}	Mint		
1996–97	Sailor Moon Sailor Stars	Usagi Tsukino/Sailor Moon, Chibi-Chibi		
1996	After War Gundam X	Toniya Malme		
1996	Those Who Hunt Elves	Celcia Marieclaire		
1997–2002	Pocket Monsters	Metamon	Episodes 37, 136	
1997	Haunted Junction	Haruto's mother		
1997	Maze (TV)	Maze (female), Mei Ikaruga	Sequel to Maze (OVA)	
1997	Revolutionary Girl Utena	Juri Arisugawa		
1997	Hyper Police	Fonne Walkure		
1997–98	Hare Tokidoki Buta	Ms. Kazuko		
1997–98	Flame of Recca	Kage Hoshi/Kagero	Also Final Burning OVA	
1997–97	Those Who Hunt Elves 2	Celcia Marieclaire		
1997–98	Vampire Princess Miyu	Mayumi, Shinma Ayu	Episode 17	
1998–99	Fushigi Mahou Fan Fan Pharmacy	Amane, Rikku	Part of Anime Shukan DX! Mi-Pha-Pu	
1998–99	Heli-Tako Pu-Chan	Porori	Part of Anime Shukan DX! Mi-Pha-Pu	
1998–99	Kocchi Muite! Miiko	Mama	Part of Anime Shukan DX! Mi-Pha-Pu	
1998	Fancy Lala	Ryoko Anzai	Episode 6	
1998	The Secrets of Akko-chan	Millefeil Kaito	1998 Remake, episode 38–39	
1998–2000	Cardcaptor Sakura	Maki Matsumoto	Episodes 5, 28, 34	
1998	Sentimental Journey	Serizawa Kotone	Episode 3	
1998	Knight Hunters	Noi, Asuka Murase, Kyouko	Also Knight Hunters Eternity	
1998	Kindaichi Case Files: The File of Young Kindaichi	Kyouka Mori, Tateha Madarame	Black Butterfly Murder File Arc, Episodes 43–45	
1998–present	Crayon Shin-chan	Masumi Ageo	First appears in episode 281	
1998–99	Orphen	Leticia MacCredy		
1998–present	Ojarumaru	Princess Okame, Hoshino's Mama, Aka Murasaki Shikibu, Nomi Nomiyama, Tomi Nomiyama		
1998–99	Steam Detectives	Aishii	Episode 25	
1999–2000	Phantom Thief Jeanne	Saki Matsubara	Episode 12	
1999–2000	Corrector Yui	Freeze		
1999–2000	Monster Farm: Enbanseki no Himitsu	Pixy (Venus)	Episodes 7, 10–11, 14, 20, 28–33, 35–37	
1999–2000	Great Teacher Onizuka	Urumi Kanzaki	Episodes 16–19	
1999–2000	Orphen: The Revenge	Leticia MacCredy		
1999–2000	Excel Saga	Excel		
1999	Oruchuban Ebichu	Ebichu		
2000–02	Daa! Daa! Daa! (UFO Baby)	Akira Kizyo		
2000	Hidamari no Ki	Oshina	Episodes 5–7, 10–11, 17, 21	
2000	Gensomaden Saiyuki	Shunhua	Episode 19	
2000–01	Gear Fighter Dendoh	Vega/Orie Kusanagi, narrator, announcer		
2000–01	Ghost Stories	Kayako Miyanoshita		
2000	Pokémon: Mewtwo Returns	Domino	TV special	
2001	Tales of Eternia	Ekusushia		
2001	Angelic Layer: Mobile Angel	Shouko Asami		
2001	Noir	Mireille Bouquet, Odette Bouquet		
2001	Steel Angel Kurumi 2	Misaki Kagura		
2001	Parappa The Rapper	Witch	Episode 28	
2001	Fruits Basket	Kagura Soma		
2001–02	A Little Snow Fairy Sugar	Ginger	Also Summer Special	
2002	Jing: King of Bandits	Izarra	Episode 8	
2002–03	Spiral: The Bonds of Reasoning	Madoka Narumi		
2002–03	Mobile Suit Gundam SEED	Murrue Ramius, Haro, Ezaria Joule, narrator	Also Special Edition	
2002–03	Knight Hunters: Eternity	Noi, Asuka Murase, Kyouko	Sequel to Knight Hunters	
2002	Pokémon: Advanced Challenge	Kuruyo	Episode 76	
2002	Gag Manga Biyori (2002 Jump Festa Special)	Masuda Kouske aka Suzy		
2003–04	Kaleido Star: New Wings	Cathy Taymor	Also Legend of Phoenix OVA	
2003–06	Zatch Bell!	Elle Chivas, Riya	First appears in episode 120	
2003–04	Detective School Q	Hitomi Tachikawa	Episodes 33–34	
2003	Sumeba Miyako no Cosmos-so Suttoko Taisen Dokkoida	Sayuri Yurine, Hiyashinsu		
2003–04	Fullmetal Alchemist	Gracia Hughes	Also Conqueror of Shamballa Movie	
2004	Paranoia Agent	Harumi Chono/Maria	Episodes 2–3	
2004	Legendz: Tale of the Dragon Kings	Killbeat	Episodes 25–26, 29–30	
2004	Madlax	Margaret's mother	Episode 21	
2004–05	Agatha Christie's Great Detectives Poirot and Marple	Count Hobari's wife	Episodes 36–39	
2004–05	Tactics	Kyouko Suzakuin	Episodes 10–11	
2004–05	Mobile Suit Gundam SEED Destiny	Murrue Ramius, Haro, narrator	Also Special Edition and Final Plus: The Chosen Future OVA	
2005	Mahoraba ~Heartful days~	Yu Minazuki		
2005	Buzzer Beater	Sarah	Episode 1	
2005–present	Doraemon	Tamako Nobi (Nobita's mother)		
2005–06	The Snow Queen	Aunete	Episode 5	
2005	Ah My Buddha	Miyako Amanogawa		
2005	Moeyo Ken	Kaoru's mother	Episode 6	
2005	Angel Heart	Reiko Kawamoto	Episodes 47–49	
2005–06	IGPX Immortal Grand Prix	Judy Highsmith	Japanese dub	
2006	Ah My Buddha Season 2	Miyako Amanogawa		
2006—present	Detective Conan	Rena Mizunashi/Kir, Yuri Konno	First appears in episode 217	
2006	Love Get Chu	Eri Daimon		
2006	Koi Suru Tenshi Angelique: Kokoro no Mezameru Toki	Rosalia de Catargena		
2006	Gin'iro no Olynssis	Dominique		
2007	Koi Suru Tenshi Angelique: Kagayaki no Ashita	Rosalia de Catargena		
2007	Nodame Cantabile	Seiko Miyoshi		
2007	El Cazador de la Bruja	Chairperson	Episodes 11–12, 15, 19, 21, 25	
2007	Claymore	Jean		
2007	Nagasarete Airantou	Risa		
2007–08	Mokke	Chitose Hibara		
2007	Kindaichi Case Files: The Case of the Vampire Legend Murder	Aoko Minato	TV specials	
2008	Zenryoku Usagi ^{(ja)}	Nee-san, Socho's Children		
2008	Nabari no Ou	Hanabusa Seki		
2008	Real Drive	Rinko Kuonji	Episodes 8, 25	
2008	Kemeko Deluxe!	Kiriko		
2008	Nodame Cantabile: Paris	Seiko Miyoshi		
2009	Slayers Evolution-R	Gduza		
2009	Charger Girl, Ju-den Chan	Narration, Shop manager		
2009–present	One Piece	Boa Hancock	Appeared in episode 409	
2009–10	Kokekko-san ^{(ja)}	Kokekkou-san	Also Ohayou! Kokekkou-san	
2011	Is This a Zombie?	Delusion Eucliwood	Episode 1	
2011–12	Suite PreCure♪	Hummy		
2011	Baka and Test – Summon the Beasts Season 2	Aoi Kogure	Episode 12	
2011	C³	Ganon Hojo	Episodes 7, 10	
2011–14	Hunter × Hunter (2011)	Cocco, Live Announcer	First appears in episode 27	
2012	Daily Lives of High School Boys	Homeroom teacher		
2012–13	Chitose Get You!!	Asako Fuji	Also Asako Get You!! OVAs	
2012	Naruto: Shippuden	Shiseru	Episodes 290–295	
2013	Date A Live	Narration		
2013	Blood Lad	Neyn		
2013	Gaist Crusher	Rounder		
2013	Wanna Be the Strongest in the World	Announcer	Episodes 10–12	
2013–14	Gundam Build Fighters	Rinko Iori, Lucas Kankaansyrjä, Murrue Ramius		
2014	Insufficient Direction ^{(ja)}	End-card narration	Episodes 11, 13	
2014	Love Live! Season 2	Nico's mother	Episode 13	
2014	Date A Live II	Narration		
2014	Pretty Guardian Sailor Moon Crystal Season I	Usagi Tsukino/Sailor Moon	ONA (Dark Kingdom arc)	
2014–15	Cross Ange: Rondo of Angels and Dragons	Aura	Episode 25	
2014	I Can't Understand What My Husband Is Saying	Hajime's Mother		
2015	Pretty Guardian Sailor Moon Crystal Season II	Usagi Tsukino/Sailor Moon	ONA (Black Moon arc)	
2015	Kamisama Kiss ◎	Mizutama		
2016	Assassination Classroom Season 2	Hiromi Shiota	First appears in episode 9	
2016	KonoSuba: God's Blessing on This Wonderful World!	Succubus receptionist	Episode 9	
2016	Pretty Guardian Sailor Moon Crystal Season III	Usagi Tsukino/Sailor Moon	TV Anime (Death Busters arc)	
2016	The Morose Mononokean	Tomori	Episodes 11–12	
2016	Danganronpa 3: The End of Hope's Peak High School	Peko Pekoyama	Despair and Hope arcs	
2016	Ohayou! Kokekkou-san ^{(ja)}	Kokekkou-san		
2016	Cheating Craft	Teacher Oh, narration		
2016	Time Bokan 24	Florence Nightingale	Episode 23	
2017	Schoolgirl Strikers	Morgana		
2017	Tsugumomo	Kanaka Kagami		
2017	Aikatsu Stars!	Yukie Grace Forte		
2017	Eromanga Sensei	Narration		
2017	Elegant Yokai Apartment Life	Mariko		
2017	Girls' Last Tour	Ishii	Episode 6	
2017	The Ancient Magus' Bride	Rahab	Episode 10	
2018	Pop Team Epic	Pipimi	Episode 12a	
2018	Shinkansen Henkei Robo Shinkalion	Misato Katsuragi	Cameo, episode 31	
2018–21	Zombie Land Saga	Tae Yamada		
2019	Pastel Memories	Udonchan		
2019	Cautious Hero: The Hero Is Overpowered but Overly Cautious	Mitis		
2020	Plunderer	Frienda		
2020	Tsugu Tsugumomo	Kanaka Kagami		
2020	Deca-Dence	Munin		
2020	The Gymnastics Samurai	Tomoyo Aragaki		
2020–22	Princess Connect! Re:Dive	Mitsuki / Mitsuki Yoigahama		
2021–present	Jujutsu Kaisen	Mei Mei		
2021	Shaman King	Sati		
2022	Me & Roboco	Bondo's mother		
2023	Migi & Dali	Yōko Sonoyama		
2023	The Family Circumstances of the Irregular Witch	Lady		
2024	Pokémon Horizons: The Series	Katy		
2025	Kaiju No. 8	Hikari Shinomiya	Season 2	
2025	Li'l Miss Vampire Can't Suck Right	Misuzu Kirimine		
2026	Kaiju Girl Caramelise	Rinko Akaishi		
2026	Witch Hat Atelier	Alaira		
2026	Dr. Stone	Why-Man female voice		^{Ep. 94 credits}

=== Original video animation (OVA) ===
List of voice performances in OVAs
Year	Title	Role	Notes	Source
1989–90	Ace o Nerae! Final Stage	Tomoyo	Debut role	
1990	My Daddy Long Legs	lady, nurse, student, customer	Part of World Masterpiece Theater Series	
1990–92	Tales Trilogy: Tales of Titillation	Chami, girl A	Adult Video	
1990	Furiten-kun	Yumiko		
1990–91	Cyber City Oedo 808	Woman		
1990	Nineteen19	Yuko		
1990	New Dream Hunter Rem: The Knights Around Her Bed	Doll		
1991	Dark Warrior	Pamela		
1991	Blazing Transfer Student	Schoolgirl D		
1991–91	Tales of Yajikita College	Student	Episode 2	
1991–93	The Heroic Legend of Arslan	Estelle de la Fano		
1991	Tales of Seduction	Tomoko	Adult Video	
1992	Sequence	female student A		
1992	Babel II	Juju		
1992–93	Gorillaman	Kaori Kitamura		
1992	Aoi Sei: Angie & Rose (Cream Lemon)	Angie	Adult Video	
1992–92	Jankenman: Kaijudaikessen	Chokkin	Sequel to Jankenman	
1992	Future GPX Cyber Formula: 11	Asuka Sugo		
1992–93	Ys II: Castle in the Heavens	Lilia		
1993	Ambassador Magma	Imai Midori	Episode 8	
1993	Alien Defender Geo-Armor: Kishin Corps	Fay		
1993	Dragon Half	Mink		
1993	The Fashion Boy Is Cool	Kotobuki Fujiya	Part of Margaret Video Series	
1993	NG Knight Ramune & 40 DX	Mountain Dew Silver		
1993–95	Idol Defense Force Hummingbird	Satsuki Toreishi		
1993	Suikoden Demon Century	Kiyomi Suga		
1993–94	My My Mai	Yua		
1994	Future GPX Cyber Formula: Zero	Asuka Sugo		
1994–97	Legend of the Galactic Heroes: season 3	Katerose von Kreuzer	First appears in episode 55	
1994–95	Phantom Quest Corp.	Nanami Rokugou	Episodes 2–4	
1994–96	Yamato 2520	Maki		
1995	Makeruna! Makendô	Mai Tsurugino		
1995	Tokyo Revelation	Saki Yagami		
1995	Macross 7: Encore	Commander Chlore		
1995	Compiler 2	Nerima Queen		
1996–98	Power Dolls: Project a	Yao Fei-Lun		
1996	Future GPX Cyber Formula: Early Days Renewal	Asuka Sugo		
1996	Maze (OVA)	Maze (female)		
1996–98	Blue Seed: Beyond	Kome Sawaguchi	Sequel to Blue Seed	
1996–97	Birdy the Mighty	Birdy		
1996	Future GPX Cyber Formula: Saga	Asuka Sugo		
1996–97	Variable Geo	Yuka Takeuchi		
1996–97	Gall Force: The Revolution	Rabby		
1996–97	Wedding Peach DX	Potamos/Hiromi Kawanami	Sequel to Wedding Peach	
1997	I Dream of Mimi (Buttobi!! CPU)	Quadra Nackintosh	Adult Video	
1997–98	Voogie's Angel	Rebecca Sweet Heisen		
1998	Very Private Lesson	Teacher Satsuki		
1998	Future GPX Cyber Formula: Sin	Asuka Sugo		
1999	Time Ranger Cesar Boy no Bouken: Roma Teikoku-hen ^{(ja)}	Karen Glory		
1999–02	Ten Tokyo Warriors	Hakiri		
2000	Angelique: Shiroi Tsubasa no Memoir	Rosalia de Catargena		
2000	Kirara	Kirara Imai (Older)		
2000	De:Vadasy	Amara Minakushi		
2000	Detective Conan OVA 01: Conan VS KID VS Yaiba	Sayaka Mine, Yuri Konno		
2001	Angelique: Seichi Yori Ai i Komete	Rosalia de Catargena		
2001	Puni Puni Poemy	Itsue Aasu		
2001–02	Ajimu: Beach Story	Kyoko		
2001	Zaion: I Wish You Were Here	Misao Mitsuki		
2004	Angelique	Rosalia de Catargena		
2005	Kaleido Star: Legend of Phoenix	Cathy Taymor	Sequel to Kaleido Star: New Wings	
2010	Yondemasu yo, Azazel-san	Tomiko Senba	Episode 3	
2010	Bungaku Shojo Memoir I – Yume-Miru Shojo no Prelude	Kanako Sakurai		
2010	Hiyokoi	Miyoko Mitani	Specials	
2011	Carnival Phantasm	Aoko Aozaki		
2017	Super Danganronpa 2.5: Nagito Komaeda and the Destroyer of the World	Peko Pekoyama		
2024	Star Blazers: Space Battleship Yamato 3199	Shalbart Iscandar	Appears from the fifth movie "Part 5: White Heat Galactic War", released in 2026 and collecting episodes 15 to 18	

=== Anime films ===
List of voice performances in films
Year	Title	Role	Notes	Source
1990	Heavy			
1991	The Adventures of Gamba and Sea Otter	Kawamo		
1992	Floral Magician Mary Bell: The Key Of Phoenix	Ribbon		
1993	Sailor Moon R: The Movie	Usagi Tsukino/Sailor Moon	Also Make Up! Sailor Guardians	
1993	On a Paper Crane – Tomoko's Adventure	Tomoko		
1993	Fatal Fury 2: The New Battle	Mai Shiranui	Sequel to Legend of the Hungry Wolf	
1993	Mother: E.Y.E.S. of Mars	Eve Doorson, Additional Voices		
1994	Fatal Fury: The Motion Picture	Mai Shiranui		
1994	Darkside Blues	Mai		
1994	Sailor Moon S: The Movie	Usagi Tsukino/Sailor Moon		
1995	Sailor Moon SuperS: The Movie	Usagi Tsukino/Sailor Moon	Also Ami-chan's First Love	
1996	Dragon Quest Biography: Emblem of Roto	Teeth		
1996	X	Satsuki Yatōji		
1997	Neon Genesis Evangelion: Death & Rebirth	Misato Katsuragi		
1997	The End of Evangelion	Misato Katsuragi		
1998	Maze Bakunetsu Jiku: Tenpen Kyoi no Giant	Mei Ikaruga / Maze (female)		
1998	Crayon Shin-chan: Blitzkrieg! Pig's Hoof's Secret Mission	O-Iroke		
1998	Martian Successor Nadesico: The Motion Picture – Prince of Darkness	Mayumi's older sister		
1999	Crayon Shin-chan: Explosion! The Hot Spring's Feel Good Final Battle	Ageo-Sensei		
1999	Pokémon: The Movie 2000	Captain Michiko		
1999	Adolescence of Utena	Juri Arisugawa		
1999	Cardcaptor Sakura: The Movie	Maki Matsumoto		
2000	Crayon Shin-chan: The Storm Called The Jungle	Ageo-Sensei		
2000	Space Travelers: The Animation	Gold Papillon		
2001	Crayon Shin-chan: The Storm Called: The Adult Empire Strikes Back	Ageo-Sensei		
2001	Digimon Tamers: Battle of Adventurers	Minami Uehara		
2001	Hamtaro: Adventures in Ham-Ham Land	Yosei Hamu		
2002	ex-Driver: The Movie	Kelly		
2003	Crayon Shin-chan: The Storm Called: Yakiniku Road of Honor	Ageo-Sensei		
2004	Zatch Bell: Unlisted Demon #101	Kotoha's Mother		
2005	Fullmetal Alchemist the Movie: Conqueror of Shamballa	Gracia Hughes		
2006	Doraemon: Nobita's Dinosaur 2006	Tamako Nobi (Nobita's mother)		
2006	Crayon Shin-chan: The Legend Called: Dance! Amigo!	Ageo-Sensei		
2007	Doraemon: Nobita's New Great Adventure into the Underworld	Tamako Nobi (Nobita's mother)		
2007	Evangelion: 1.0 You Are (Not) Alone	Misato Katsuragi		
2008	Doraemon: Nobita and the Green Giant Legend	Tamako Nobi (Nobita's mother)		
2009	Doraemon the Movie: Nobita's Spaceblazer	Tamako Nobi (Nobita's mother)		
2009	Crayon Shin-chan: Roar! Kasukabe Animal Kingdom	Ageo-Sensei		
2009	Evangelion: 2.0 You Can (Not) Advance	Misato Katsuragi		
2009	Duel Masters: Lunatic God Saga	Chlor		
2009	The Rebirth of Buddha	Mari Kimura		
2010	Doraemon: Nobita's Great Battle of the Mermaid King	Tamako Nobi (Nobita's mother)		
2011	Doraemon: Nobita and the New Steel Troops—Winged Angels	Tamako Nobi (Nobita's mother)		
2011	Pretty Cure All Stars DX3: Deliver the Future! The Rainbow-Colored Flower That Connects the World	Hummy		
2011	Suite PreCure the Movie: Take it Back! The Miraculous Melody that Connects Hearts!	Hummy		
2012	Doraemon: Nobita and the Island of Miracles—Animal Adventure	Tamako Nobi (Nobita's mother)		
2012	Pretty Cure All Stars New Stage: Friends of the Future	Hummy		
2012	Crayon Shin-chan: The Storm Called!: Me and the Space Princess	Ageo-sensei		
2012	Gothicmade	Elderi Tsubanchi		
2012	Evangelion: 3.0 You Can (Not) Redo	Misato Katsuragi		
2013	Doraemon: Nobita's Secret Gadget Museum	Tamako Nobi (Nobita's mother)		
2013	Hunter × Hunter: The Last Mission	Cocco		
2014	Doraemon: New Nobita's Great Demon—Peko and the Exploration Party of Five	Tamako Nobi (Nobita's mother)		
2014	Stand by Me Doraemon	Tamako Nobi (Nobita's mother)		
2014	Expelled from Paradise	Hilde Thorvald		
2015	Doraemon: Nobita's Space Heroes	Tamako Nobi (Nobita's mother)		
2015	Crayon Shin-chan: My Moving Story! Cactus Large Attack!	Ageo-Sensei		
2015	Love Live! The School Idol Movie	Nico's Mother		
2016	Doraemon: Nobita and the Birth of Japan 2016	Tamako Nobi (Nobita's mother)		
2016	Crayon Shin-chan: Fast Asleep! The Great Assault on Dreamy World!	Ageo-Sensei		
2016	Detective Conan: The Darkest Nightmare	Hidemi Hondo		
2017	Doraemon the Movie 2017: Great Adventure in the Antarctic Kachi Kochi	Tamako Nobi (Nobita's mother)		
2018	Doraemon: Nobita's Treasure Island	Tamako Nobi (Nobita's mother)		
2018	Crayon Shin-chan: Burst Serving! Kung Fu Boys ~Ramen Rebellion~	Ageo-Sensei		
2019	Doraemon: Nobita's Chronicle of the Moon Exploration	Tamako Nobi (Nobita's mother)		
2019	Crayon Shin-chan: Honeymoon Hurricane ~The Lost Hiroshi~	Ageo-Sensei		
2020	Doraemon: Nobita's New Dinosaur	Tamako Nobi (Nobita's mother)		
2020	Crayon Shin-chan: Crash! Graffiti Kingdom and Almost Four Heroes	Aheo-Sensei		
2020	Stand by Me Doraemon 2	Tamako Nobi (Nobita's mother)		
2021	Pretty Guardian Sailor Moon Eternal The Movie	Usagi Tsukino/Super Sailor Moon	2-Part Film, Season 4 of Sailor Moon Crystal (Dead Moon arc)	
2021	Evangelion: 3.0+1.0	Misato Katsuragi		
2021	The Journey	Hind		
2021	Jujutsu Kaisen 0	Mei Mei		
2022	Doraemon: Nobita's Little Star Wars 2021	Tamako Nobi (Nobita's mother)		
2023	Pretty Guardian Sailor Moon Cosmos The Movie	Usagi Tsukino/Eternal Sailor Moon, Chibi-Chibi/Sailor Chibi-Chibi Moon	2-Part Film, Season 5 of Sailor Moon Crystal (Shadow Galactica arc)	
2023	Doraemon: Nobita's Sky Utopia	Tamako Nobi (Nobita's mother)		
2024	Mobile Suit Gundam SEED Freedom	Murrue Ramius		
2024	Doraemon: Nobita's Earth Symphony	Tamako Nobi (Nobita's mother)		
2025	Doraemon: Nobita's Art World Tales	Tamako Nobi (Nobita's mother)		
2025	Zombie Land Saga: Yumeginga Paradise	Tae Yamada		
2026	Doraemon: New Nobita and the Castle of the Undersea Devil	Tamako Nobi (Nobita's mother)		

=== Video games ===
List of voice performances in video games
Year	Title	Role	Platform(s)	Notes
1991	Wakusei Woodstock: Funky Horror Band	Amaris	Mega CD	
1992	Quiz Scramble Special	Character Voice	Mega CD	
1992	Jantei Monogatari 2: Uchu Tantei Diban – Kanketsu Hen	Majuu Emurisu	TurboGrafx-16 (PC Engine)	
1992	Knuckle Heads	Claudia Silva		
1992	Pastel Lime	Aki	TurboGrafx-16 (PC Engine)	
1993	Knuckle Heads	Claudia Silva	Arcade	
1993	Jantei Monogatari 3: Saver Angels	Majuu Emurisu, Rampling	TurboGrafx-16 (PC Engine)	
1993	Tanjo: Debut	Mikan Narusawa	PC-98, FM Towns, TurboGrafx-16 (PC Engine), Macintosh, 3DO, Sega Saturn, WonderSwan	
1993	3×3 Eyes: Seima Densetsu	Satie	Mega CD	
1994	Puyo Puyo CD	Arle Nadja	TurboGrafx-16 (PC Engine)	
1994	Shining Force CD	Narrator	Mega CD	
1994	Bishoujo Senshi Sailor Moon	Usagi Tsukino/Sailor Moon	TurboGrafx-16 (PC Engine)	
1994	Dragon Half	Mink	TurboGrafx-16 (PC Engine)	
1994	Power Instinct 2	Mikazuki Kurumi, Kurara Hananokoji	Arcade, PlayStation	
1994	Bishoujo Senshi Sailor Moon Collection	Usagi Tsukino/Sailor Moon	TurboGrafx-16 (PC Engine)	
1994	Bishoujo Senshi Sailor Moon S: Quiz Taiketsu! Sailor Power Kesshuu!!	Usagi Tsukino/Sailor Moon	Playdia	
1995	Bishoujo Senshi Sailor Moon	Usagi Tsukino/Sailor Moon	Arcade	
1995	Bishoujo Senshi Sailor Moon SS: Sailor Moon to Hajimete no Eigo	Usagi Tsukino/Sailor Moon	Playdia	
1995	Bishoujo Senshi Sailor Moon SuperS: Sailor Moon to Hiragana Lesson	Usagi Tsukino/Sailor Moon	Playdia	
1995	Bishoujo Senshi Sailor Moon SuperS: Youkoso! Sailor Youchien	Usagi Tsukino/Sailor Moon	Playdia	
1995	Makeruna! Makendo 2	Mai Tsurugino	PlayStation	
1995	Logos Panic GO.A.I.SA.TU.	Female	Super Famicom	
1995	Angelique Special	Rosalia de Catargena	PC-FX, Windows 95, Sega Saturn, PlayStation	
1996	Neon Genesis Evangelion: 1st Impression	Misato Katsuragi	Sega Saturn	
1996	Bishoujo Senshi Sailor Moon Super S: Shin Shuyaku Soudatsusen	Usagi Tsukino/Sailor Moon	PlayStation, Sega Saturn	
1996	Puyo Puyo 2 CD	Arle Nadja	TurboGrafx-16 (PC Engine)	
1996	Virgin Dream	Ena Nakai	TurboGrafx-16 (PC Engine)	
1996	PoPoLoCRoIS	Narcia/Kai	PlayStation, Game Archives (PlayStation 3, PlayStation Portable)	
1996	Angelique Special 2	Rosalia de Catargena	PC-FX, Windows 95, Mac OS, Sega Saturn, PlayStation	
1996	Fire Woman: Matoi-gumi	Sayaka Katsuragi	PC-FX, PlayStation	
1997	Neon Genesis Evangelion: Girlfriend of Steel	Misato Katsuragi	Windows 95, Mac OS, Sega Saturn, PlayStation, PlayStation 2, PlayStation Portable	
1997	Neon Genesis Evangelion: 2nd Impression	Misato Katsuragi	Sega Saturn	
1997	QuoVadis 2 ~Planet Assault Ovan Rey~	Nelly Catena	Sega Saturn	
1997	Armored Core: Project Phantasma	Operator, Computer Voice	PlayStation	
1997	Eberouge Special: The School Life of Love and Magic-	Lindel Falken	Windows 95, PlayStation, Sega Saturn	
1997	Power Dolls 2 – Detachment of Limited Line Service	Yao Fei-Lun	PlayStation	
1997	Rival Schools: United By Fate	Kyoko Minazuki	Arcade, PlayStation	
1998	Eberouge 2	Lindel Falken	Windows 95, PlayStation	
1998	Makeruna! Makendo Z	Mai Tsurugino	PC-FX	
1998–04	Power Pros 5–11	Stadium Announcer	Nintendo 64, PlayStation 2, GameCube	
1998	Brave Fencer Musashi	Queen, Brandy Taii, Tumbler	PlayStation	
1998	Eva to Yukai na Nakamatachi	Misato Katsuragi	Sega Saturn, PlayStation, Windows, Game Boy Color	
1998	Kisetsu wo Dakishimete	Tomoko Kokuritsu	PlayStation, PlayStation Portable	
1998	Ajito 2	Kazumi Saeki	PlayStation	
1999	Neon Genesis Evangelion 64	Misato Katsuragi	Nintendo 64	
1999	Little Princess: Marl Okoku no Ningyo Hime 2	Sonia Francis Zeolight	PlayStation	
2000	Eve: Zero	Marina Houjou	PlayStation, Windows, Dreamcast	
2000	Menkyo wo Toro! (Get the License)	Reika Asami	PlayStation	
2000	Project Justice	Kyoko Minazuki	Arcade, Dreamcast	
2001	Neon Genesis Evangelion: Ayanami Raising Project	Misato Katsuragi	Windows, Dreamcast, PlayStation 2, Nintendo DS	
2001	21: Two One	Momiji Kikyo	Windows, Dreamcast	
2001	Oni	Konoko (AKA Mai Hasegawa)	Windows, Mac	
2001	Eve: The Fatal Attraction	Marina Houjou	PlayStation, Windows	
2001	Dead or Alive 3	Christie	Xbox	
2001	Abarenbo Princess	Rouge Victoire	PlayStation 2	
2001	Bishoujo Senshi Sailor Moon: Happy Chibiusa World	Usagi Tsukino/Sailor Moon	PlayStation	
2002	Melty Blood	Aoko Aozaki	Windows	
2003	Dead or Alive Xtreme Beach Volleyball	Christie	Xbox	
2003	Eve: Burst Error	Marina Houjou	PlayStation 2	Plus Version
2003	Neon Genesis Evangelion 2	Misato Katsuragi	PlayStation 2, PlayStation Portable	
2003	Future GPX Cyber Formula: Road to the Infinity	Asuka Sugo	PlayStation 2	
2004	Flame of Recca: Final Burning	Kagero	PlayStation 2	
2004	Neon Genesis Evangelion: Shinji Ikari Raising Project	Misato Katsuragi	Windows	
2004	Waga Ryuu o Miyo: Pride of the Dragon Peace	Kaaya	PlayStation 2	
2004	Magna Carta	Rianna	PlayStation 2, PlayStation Portable	
2005	Wild Arms 4	Farmel Arianhrod	PlayStation 2	
2005	Neon Genesis Evangelion: Girlfriend of Steel 2nd	Misato Katsuragi	Windows, Mac OS (X), PlayStation 2, PlayStation Portable	
2005	Namco × Capcom	Kyoko Minazuki	PlayStation 2	
2005	Dead or Alive 4	Christie	Xbox 360	
2006	Crayon Shin-chan: Densetsu o Yobu Omake no To Shukkugaan!	Ageo-Sensei	Game Boy Advance	
2006	Eve ~New Generation~	Marina Houjou	PlayStation 2, Windows	
2006	Dead or Alive Xtreme 2	Christie	Xbox 360	
2006	Crayon Shin-chan: Saikyou Kazoku Kasukabe King Wii	Ageo-Sensei	Wii	
2007	Detective Evangelion	Misato Katsuragi	PlayStation 2	
2007	Crayon Shin-chan DS: Arashi wo Yobu Nutte Crayoon Daisakusen!	Ageo-Sensei	Nintendo DS	
2007	Neon Genesis Evangelion: Battle Orchestra	Misato Katsuragi	PlayStation 2, PlayStation Portable	
2008	Crayon Shin-chan: Arashi o Yobu Cinema Land	Ageo-Sensei	Nintendo DS	
2009	Crayon Shin-chan: Arashi o Yobu – Nendororon Daihenshin	Ageo-Sensei	Nintendo DS	
2010	Crayon Shin-chan: Obaka Daininden – Susume! Kasukabe Ninja Tai!	Ageo-Sensei	Nintendo DS	
2010	Misato Katsuragi's Reporting Plan	Misato Katsuragi	PlayStation 3, PlayStation Portable (Remote Play)	
2010	Dead or Alive: Paradise	Christie	PlayStation Portable, PlayStation Vita	
2010	Last Ranker	Norma	PlayStation Portable	
2010	Crayon Shin-chan Shokkugan! Densetsu wo Yobu Omake Daiketsusen!!	Ageo-Sensei	Nintendo DS	
2011	Catherine	Katherine McBride	PlayStation 3, Xbox 360, PC, PlayStation 4, PlayStation Vita	
2011	Dead or Alive: Dimensions	Christie	Nintendo 3DS	
2011	Gundam Memories: Tatakai no Kioku	Murrue Ramius	PlayStation Portable	
2011	inFAMOUS 2	Lucy Quo	PlayStation 3	Japanese localisation
2011	Crayon Shin-chan: Uchu de Achoo!? Yujo no Obakarate	Ageo-Sensei	Nintendo 3DS	
2012	Armored Core V	Computer Voice	PlayStation 3, Xbox 360	
2012	One Piece: Pirate Warriors	Hancock	PlayStation 3	
2012	Danganronpa 2: Goodbye Despair	Peko Pekoyama	PlayStation Portable, PlayStation Vita, Windows, OS X, Linux, PlayStation 4	
2012	Dead or Alive 5	Christie	PlayStation 3, Xbox 360	
2013	One Piece: Pirate Warriors 2	Hancock	PlayStation 3, PlayStation Vita	
2013	One Piece: Unlimited World Red	Boa Hancock	Nintendo 3DS, PlayStation 3, PlayStation 4, PlayStation Vita, Wii U, Nintendo Switch, Windows	
2013	Call of Duty: Ghosts	Voices	Windows, PlayStation 3, PlayStation 4, Wii U, Xbox 360, Xbox One	Japanese localisation
2014	Super Heroine Chronicle	Eve/Valentine	PlayStation 3, PlayStation Vita	
2014	J-Stars Victory VS	Boa Hancock	PlayStation 3, PlayStation Vita, PlayStation 4	
2014	Crayon Shin-chan: Arashi wo Yobu Kasukabe Eiga Stars!	Ageo-Sensei	Nintendo 3DS	
2014	Lego Batman 3: Beyond Gotham	Star Sapphire	Wii U, Nintendo 3DS, PlayStation 4, PlayStation 3, PlayStation Vita, Xbox 360, Xbox One, Windows	Japanese localization
2015	Princess Connect!	Mitsuki Yoigahama	Android, iOS	
2015	Dead or Alive 5 Last Round	Christie	Arcade, Windows, PlayStation 3, PlayStation 4, Xbox 360, Xbox One	
2015	One Piece: Pirate Warriors 3	Hancock	PlayStation 3, PlayStation 4, PlayStation Vita, Windows, Nintendo Switch	
2015	Rainbow Six: Siege	Six	Windows, PlayStation 4, Xbox One	Japanese localization
2015	Project X Zone 2	Sheath	Nintendo 3DS	
2015	Angelique Retour	Rosalia de Catargena	PlayStation Portable, PlayStation Vita	
2016	One Piece: Burning Blood	Boa Hancock	PlayStation Portable, PlayStation Vita	
2016	Eve: Burst Error R	Marina Houjou	PlayStation Vita, Windows, Nintendo Switch	Remake of Eve: Burst Error
2017	Danganronpa V3: Killing Harmony	Peko Pekoyama	PlayStation Portable, PlayStation Vita, Windows	
2017	Granblue Fantasy	Michael	Android, iOS, Web	
2018	Princess Connect! Re:Dive	Mitsuki Yoigahama	Android, iOS	
2018	Super Robot Wars V	Misato Katsuragi, Toniya Malme, Vega, Murrue Ramius	PlayStation 4, PlayStation Vita	
2018	Super Smash Bros. Ultimate	Ditto	Nintendo Switch	
2018	Super Robot Wars X-O	Misato Katsuragi	Android, iOS	April 14–23 event
2019	Catherine: Full Body	Katherine McBride	PlayStation 4, PlayStation Vita	
2019	Jump Force	Boa Hancock	PlayStation 4, PlayStation Vita, Xbox One, PC	
2019	Dead or Alive 6	Christie	PlayStation 4, Xbox One, PC, Arcade	
2019	Puyopuyo!! Quest	Sailor Moon	iOS, Android	Puyo Puyo × Sailor Moon collaboration event
2019	Kyoutou Kotoba RPG: Kotodaman	Misato Katsuragi	iOS, Android	Kotodaman × Evangelion collaboration event
2019	Eve: Rebirth Terror	Marina Houjou	PlayStation 4, PlayStation Vita	
2022	Eve: Ghost Enemies	Marina Houjou	PlayStation 4, Nintendo Switch	
2023	Fire Emblem Engage	Lumera	Nintendo Switch	
2023	Tower of Fantasy	Rubilia	PlayStation 4, PlayStation 5, PC, iOS, Android	
2024	Honkai: Star Rail	Jade	PlayStation 4, PlayStation 5, PC, iOS, Android	
2024	Magia Record: Puella Magi Madoka Magica Side Story	Yusa Yumeno / Yu	iOS, Android	
2024	Goddess of Victory: Nikke	Misato Katsuragi	iOS, Android	
2025	Arknights	Vulpisfoglia	iOS,Android	
2026	Umamusume: Pretty Derby	Azuma	iOS, Android, Windows	
TBA	Mystereet F ~Tantei-tachi no Curtain Call~	Miyuki Nanjou	PlayStation 4, PlayStation Vita	

=== Dubbing ===
Movies
Year	Title	Role	Original Performer	Notes	Source
1984	Tex				
1995	The Next Karate Kid	Julie Pierce	Hilary Swank		
1995	Pet Shop	Dena Yeagher	Leigh Ann Orsi		
1997	Boogie Nights	Roller Girl	Heather Graham		
1998	A Life Less Ordinary	Celine Naville	Cameron Diaz		
1998	I Know What You Did Last Summer	Helen Shivers	Sarah Michelle Gellar		
1999	The Big Hit	Keiko Nishi	China Chow		
1999	Brokedown Palace	Darlene Davis	Kate Beckinsale		
2000	Cruel Intentions	Kathryn Merteuil	Sarah Michelle Gellar		
2000	Where the Heart Is	Novalee Nation	Natalie Portman		
2000	Coyote Ugly	Violet Sanford	Piper Perabo		
2001	What Women Want	Lola	Marisa Tomei		
2003	So Close	Lynn	Shu Qi		
2003	Cat People	Irena Gallier	Nastassja Kinski		
2004	L'Auberge Espagnole	Anna-Sophie	Judith Godrèche		
2004	Van Helsing	Anna Valerious	Kate Beckinsale		
2005	13 Going on 30	Jenna Rink	Jennifer Garner		
2007	The Flying Scotsman	Anne Obree	Laura Fraser		
2008	The Big White	Margaret	Holly Hunter		
2009	A Lot like Love	Michelle	Kathryn Hahn		
2009	Quarantine	Angela Vidal	Jennifer Carpenter		
2010	Piranha 3D	Julie Forrester	Elisabeth Shue		
2011	Cedar Rapids	Joan Ostrowski-Fox	Anne Heche		
2014	Runner Runner	Rebecca Shafran	Gemma Arterton	20th Century Fox version	
2013	The Secret Life of Walter Mitty	Cheryl Melhoff	Kristen Wiig		
2015	People Places Things	Charlie	Stephanie Allynne		
2015	The Divergent Series: Insurgent	Evelyn Johnson-Eaton	Naomi Watts		
2016	The Divergent Series: Allegiant	Evelyn Johnson-Eaton	Naomi Watts		
2019	Shazam!	Rosa Vasquez	Marta Milans		
2021	Enter the Fat Dragon	Maggie	Jessica Jann		
2022	Final Cut	Nadia	Bérénice Bejo		
2022	Amsterdam	Valerie Bandenberg	Margot Robbie		
2023	The Thing About Pam	Pam Hupp	Renée Zellweger		
2023	Shazam! Fury of the Gods	Rosa Vásquez	Marta Milans		
2024	Godzilla x Kong: The New Empire	HEAV			
2026	Project Hail Mary	Eva Stratt	Sandra Hüller		
2026	Spider-Man: Brand New Day	E.V.	Naomi Watts		
2026	Digger	Emma Rockwell	Sandra Hüller		

TV Shows
Year	Title	Role	Original Performer	Notes	Source
1989	Star Trek: The Next Generation	Salia	Jaime Hubbard	Episode 36	
1991–94	Baywatch	Summer Quinn	Nicole Eggert	Seasons 2–4	
1998–02	Felicity	Julie Emrick	Amy Jo Johnson		
2000–04	Ed	Carol Vessey	Julie Bowen		
2005–Present	Grey's Anatomy	Meredith Grey	Ellen Pompeo		

Animation
Year	Title	Role	Notes	Source
2000	Heavy Metal	Girl	"Grimaldi" segment	
2001	Casper's Haunted Christmas	Carol Jollimore		
2005	Lilo & Stitch: The Series	Penny Proud	S2: E14 "Spats"	
2005	Chicken Little	Tina		
2011	Adventure Time	Ice Queen	First appears in episode 61	
2021	Middlemost Post	Parker J. Cloud		

=== Live action ===
List of performances in live action shows
Year	Title	Role	Type	Notes	Source
1998	Love & Pop	Radio DJ (Voice only)	Film		
2013	Unfair: Double Meaning Yes or No?	Masked Man (Voice only)	TV	Tokusatsu	
2019	The Woman of S.R.I.		TV	Season 19	
2021	How to Get a Divorce for the Whole Family!	Midori Mizuguchi	TV		
2023	Tales of the Unusual: Summer 2023	Yōko Kobayashi	TV	short drama	
2024	Dear Radiance	Tokihime	TV	Taiga drama	
2026	Love≠Comedy	Mariko Minamikaze	Film		
2026	Human Vapor	Medical Examiner	TV	Episode 2	
2027	10 Things I Want to Do Before I Turn 40: The Movie	Suzuko (voice) / Reiko Hanamura	Film		

== Discography ==
=== Solo ===
- 1993: Mo' Merry [PICA-1010]
- 1994: A・Ha・Ha [PICA-1027]
- 1994: Cotton Colour [PICA-1036]
- 1995: Birthday of the Sun [PICA-1061]
- 1995: Koto-cha wan no Itsumoissho Kenmei – Kotochawanderland [PICA-1079]
- 1996: Yasashi Otona ni Naru Tame ni [PICA-1094]
- 1998: Niku to Kokoro [TYCY-5608/9]

=== In Seiyuu Groups ===
==== Humming Bird (1993–1995) ====
- 1993: Hummingbird FIRST FLIGHT [TYCY-5311]
- 1993: ハミングバード 太陽と裸 [TYCY-5316]
- 1993: 熱狂の"裸・Eve" Summer Aviation Tour '93 [TYCY-5337]
- 1994: ハミングバード '94夏 トラ・トラ・トラ！ [TYCY-5391]
- 1994: ハミングバード外伝"ザッツ・ミュージカル"卯月の反乱～こんな日が来るなんて [TYCY-5398]
- 1995: ハミングバードザッピングCD – Vols. 1–5 [TYCY-5418 – TYCY-5422]
- 1995: ハミングバード 山虎 '95風の唄&夢の場所へ [TYCY-5441]
- 1995: さよならハミングバード [TYCY-5450]
- 1995: Hummingbird GRAND FINALE at SHIBUYA-Kokaido [TYCY-5462/3]
- 1995: Hummingbird SISTERS [TYCY-5471]

==== Angels (1996–1998) ====
- 1997: THE SONG FOR SONGS [NACL-1274]
- 1998: THE SONG FOR SONGS 2 [COR-14921]

=== Radio ===
- Mitsuishi Kotono · Bukkatsu Shiyo!
- Mitsuishi Kotono no Eberu Nights
  - Mitsuishi Kotono no Eberu Nights II
- Stardust Dream

== Other ==
- Hakkutsu! Aru Aru Daijiten (narrator)
- I Wish You Were Here (internet streaming broadcast)
- Koe · Asobu Club
- Nandemo Q (NHK) (narrator, Urara, multiple other characters)
- Neon Genesis Evangelion pachinko and pachinko slots series (Misato Katsuragi)
- Seishun Adventure: Īsha no Fune (Īsha no Fune)
- Tatta Hitotsu no Chikyū (Otohime)
- Uchi Kuru!? (narrator)
