= Noriko Uemura =

Japanese voice actress

- 上村 典子
- Born: Noriko Azuma; July 15, 1963 (age 63); Chūō-ku, Fukuoka, Japan
- Occupations: Actress; voice actress; narrator
- Years active: 1982–present
- Agent: Aoni Production
- Height: 161 cm (5 ft 3 in)
- Spouse: Iriya Azuma

Noriko Uemura (上村 典子, Uemura Noriko; born July 15, 1963) is a Japanese actress, voice actress and narrator who works for Aoni Production. She is married to Toei Animation producer Iriya Azuma. Her hometown is Fukuoka, Japan.

== Filmography ==
=== Anime television series ===
- Captain Tsubasa (1983) – Takeshi Sawada, Yuzo Morisaki
- Sailor Moon (1992–95) – Petasos (15), Yasha (23), Queen Metaria, and Kaolinite
- One Piece (2006–present) – Roji, Luigia, Curly Dadan
- Kiteretsu Daihyakka (????) – Sayuri Kumada and Konchi
- Saint Seiya (????) – young Ikki, and Makoto
- Atashinchi (????) – Miss Hara

=== Video game series ===
- Super Magnetic Neo (2000) (Peedee)
- Soul Calibur III (2005) – Aurelia Dichalla Dolce Dalkia, Old Woman

=== Dubbing ===
- Viola Davis
  - Eat Pray Love – Delia Shiraz
  - Blackhat – FBI Special Agent Carol Barrett
  - Suicide Squad – Amanda Waller
  - Fences – Rose Lee Maxson
  - Widows – Veronica Rawlings
  - The Suicide Squad – Amanda Waller
  - Black Adam – Amanda Waller
  - The Woman King – General Nanisca
- 2 Days in the Valley – Audrey Hopper (Marsha Mason)
- Charmed (season 4 only) – Elise Rothman (Rebecca Balding)
- Hairspray – "Motormouth" Maybelle Stubbs (Queen Latifah)
