= Toshiyuki Morikawa =

Japanese voice actor and singer (born 1967)

- 森川 智之
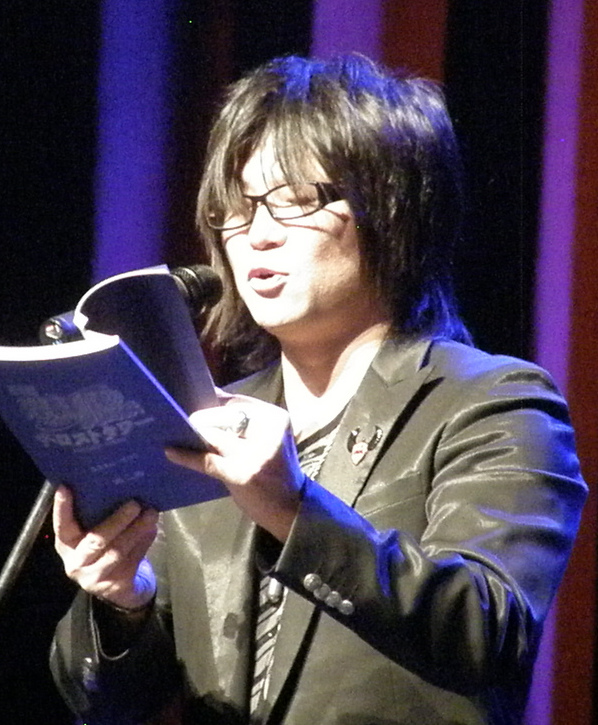
- Morikawa at Anime Expo 2011
- Born: January 26, 1967 (age 59); Shinagawa, Tokyo, Japan
- Education: Katsuta Voice Actor's Academy
- Occupations: Voice actor; narrator; singer
- Years active: 1987–present
- Agent: Axlone

Toshiyuki Morikawa (森川 智之, Morikawa Toshiyuki; born January 26, 1967) is a Japanese voice actor, narrator, and singer. He is the head of Axlone, a voice acting company he founded in April 2011. His name is sometimes, although incorrectly, transliterated as Tomoyuki Morikawa. In 2003, he and Fumihiko Tachiki formed the band "2Hearts", one of their works being the ending theme of the video game Dynasty Warriors 4: Empires. He has voiced many characters in anime and video games, including Yoshikage Kira in JoJo's Bizarre Adventure: Diamond Is Unbreakable, Kengo Akechi in Kindaichi Case Files, Sephiroth in the Final Fantasy series and Kingdom Hearts series, Dante in Devil May Cry, Kagaya Ubuyashiki in Demon Slayer: Kimetsu no Yaiba, Isshin Kurosaki and Kaname Tōsen in Bleach, Minato Namikaze in Naruto: Shippuden, Julius Novachrono in Black Clover, Mard Geer Tartaros in Fairy Tail, Eizen in Tales of Berseria, Boros in One-Punch Man, Enel, Hatchan and Scopper Gaban in One Piece, Tyki Mikk in D.Gray-man, Naraku in Inuyasha, Griffith in the 1997 series of Berserk, Isaburo Sasaki in Gintama and the main and titular character of Tekkaman Blade. He attended Katsuta Voice Actor's Academy with Kotono Mitsuishi, Chisa Yokoyama, Wataru Takagi, Sachiko Sugawara, and Michiko Neya. Because of his deep voice, he is often cast as an imposing character. He is the current official dub-over artist of Ewan McGregor, Tom Cruise, Adam Sandler, Martin Freeman, Chris Pratt, Keanu Reeves, Jude Law, Chris O'Donnell, Colin Farrell, Brendan Fraser, Mark Wahlberg, and Owen Wilson.

== Filmography ==
=== Television animation ===
1992

- Kouryu Densetsu Villgust – Kui
- Tekkaman Blade – Takaya Aiba/Tekkaman Blade
- Nangoku Shōnen Papuwa-kun – Kintaro
- Tekkaman Blade – Aiba Takaya "D-Boy"/Tekkaman Blade

1993

- Ghost Sweeper Mikami – Peter
- Mobile Suit Victory Gundam – Kill Tandon, Kuffu Salomon, Metchet Rubence
- Slam Dunk – Yohei Mito, Toki Kuwata, Kazuo Araki, Nobunaga Kiyota
- Aoki Densetsu Shoot! – Kamiya Atsushi
- YuYu Hakusho – Shishiwakamaru

1994

- Brave Police J-Decker – Duke/Duke Fire
- Sailor Moon S - Yū Kazama

1995

- The Brave of Gold Goldran – Walter Walzac/Eta Izak
- Mobile Suit Gundam Wing – Otto
- Key the Metal Idol – Shuuichi Tataki
- Juuni Senshi Bakuretsu Eto Ranger – Pochirō, Hols
- Virtua Fighter – The Animation – Onimaru
- Saint Tail – Manato Sawatari

1996

- After War Gundam X – Shagia Frost
- Case Closed – Shukichi Haneda
- Martian Successor Nadesico – Genichiro Tsukiomi
- Slayers NEXT – Keith Balzac

1997

- Anime Ganbare Goemon – Seppukumaru
- Kindaichi Case Files – Kengo Akechi
- Berserk – Griffith
- Pocket Monsters – Haunter, Bruno, Wallace

1998

- Flint the Time Detective – Wolfgang Amadeus Mozart
- Yu-Gi-Oh! – Katsuya Jonouchi
- Mamotte Shugogetten – Miyauchi Izumo

1999

- Cyborg Kurochan - Ichiro Suzuki

2000

- Descendants of Darkness – Tatsumi Seiichiro
- Digimon Adventure 02 – Haruhiko Takenouchi, Yukio Oikawa, Mummymon, Vamdemon, BelialVamdemon
- Baby Felix - Professor Tojo
- Hajime no Ippo – Alexander Volg Zangief
- One Piece – Hatchan
- Saiyuki – Homura

2001

- Inuyasha – Naraku; succeeding Hiroshi Yanaka
- Fighting Spirit – Alexander Volg Zangief
- X – Aoki Seiichiro

2002

- King of Bandit Jing – Master Gear
- Kinnikuman Nisei – Terry the Kid
- Monkey Typhoon – Saitosu
- Tokyo Mew Mew – Ron Yuebing

2003

- Full Metal Panic? Fumoffu – Atsunobu Hayashimizu
- Last Exile – Alex Row
- One Piece – Enel
- Saint Beast – Seiryuu no Gou
- F-Zero GP Legend – Ryu Suzaku (Rick Wheeler)
- Last Exile: Fam, the Silver Wing – Alex Row
- Peacemaker Kurogane – Ryunosuke Ichimura

2004

- Bleach – Isshin Kurosaki, Tsubaki, Kaname Tōsen
- Madlax – Carrossea Doon
- Kyo Kara Maoh! – Conrad Weller
- Harukanaru Toki no Naka De – Nue
- Initial D: Fourth Stage – Daiki Ninomiya
- Tenjho Tenge – Takayanagi Mitsuomi
- Inuyasha – Onigumo; Episode 148

2005

- Naruto – Kimimaro Kaguya
- Damekko Dōbutsu – Yunihiko
- Gallery Fake – Reiji Fujita
- Genesis of Aquarion – Touma
- Glass Mask – Masumi Hayami
- Speed Grapher – Chouji Suitengu
- Sukisho – Ryouya Kozuki
- Otogi-Jushi Akazukin – Jedo
- Shuffle! – King of Devils
- Super Robot Wars Original Generation: The Animation – Kyosuke Nanbu

2006

- Black Lagoon – Mr. Chang
- D.Gray-man – Tyki Mikk
- Gakuen Heaven – Hideaki Nakajima
- Futari wa Pretty Cure Splash Star – Gooyan
- Nana – Takumi Ichinose
- Night Head Genesis – Naoto Kirihara
- Saiunkoku Monogatari – Shuuei Ran
- Shōnen Onmyōji – Seiryū
- Super Robot Wars Original Generation: Divine Wars – Kyosuke Nanbu

2007

- Devil May Cry – Dante
- El Cazador de la Bruja – Roberto
- Maze – Chic
- Nodame Cantabile – Jean Donnadeiu
- Zombie Loan – Bekkō

2008

- Allison & Lillia – Travas
- Casshern Sins – Dio

2009

- Rideback – Kiefer
- InuYasha Kanketsu-Hen – Naraku
- The Melancholy of Haruhi Suzumiya – Yutaka Tamaru
- Hanasakeru Seishōnen – Lee-leng Huang
- Sengoku Basara: Samurai Kings series – Katakura Kojūrō

2010

- Naruto: Shippuden – Minato Namikaze
- Panty & Stocking with Garterbelt – Tom Croose
- Super Robot Wars Original Generation: The Inspector – Kyosuke Nanbu

2011

- Deadman Wonderland – Azuma Genkaku
- Itsuka Tenma no Kuro Usagi – Seraphim (Male voice)
- Marvel Anime: Wolverine – Cyclops
- Toriko – "Knocking Master" Jiro
- Sekai-ichi Hatsukoi – Ryūichirō Isaka
- Metal Fight Beyblade 4D – Rago / Nemesis
- Marvel Anime – Cyclops/Scott Summers

2012

- Aesthetica of a Rogue Hero – Dark Lord Galius
- Brave 10 – Yukimura Sanada
- Gintama – Sasaki Isaburo
- Hyōka – Muneyoshi Kugayama
- Kingdom – Ri Boku
- LINE TOWN – Moon
- Magi: The Labyrinth of Magic – Ugo
- Robotics;Notes – Kō Kimajima

2013

- Shirokuma Café – Panda-Mama
- Cuticle Detective Inaba – Kuniharu Ogino
- Hajime no Ippo: Rising – Alexander Volg Zangief

2014

- Bakumatsu Rock – Toshizō Hijikata
- Buddy Complex – Alfried Gallant
- Buddy Complex Kanketsu-hen: Ano Sora ni Kaeru Mirai de – Alfried Gallant
- Captain Earth – Taiyou Manatsu
- Gundam Reconguista in G – Cahill Saint
- Kamigami no Asobi – Thoth Caduceus
- Strange+ – Ozu
- Sword Art Online II – Seijirou Kikuoka
- Sengoku Basara: End of Judgement – Katakura Kojūrō

2015

- Durarara!!x2 – Igor
- Hokuto no Ken: Ichigo Aji – Shin
- Junjou Romantica – Ryuichiro Isaka
- Ninja Slayer From Animation – Fujikido Kenji / Ninja Slayer
- One-Punch Man – Boros
- Diabolik Lovers: More,Blood – Carla Tsukinami

2016

- Danganronpa 3: The End of Kibōgamine Gakuen – Kyosuke Munakata
- Taboo Tattoo – Brad Blackstone
- Fairy Tail – Mard Geer Tartaros
- Joker Game – Amari
- Macross Delta – Arad Mölders
- JoJo's Bizarre Adventure: Diamond Is Unbreakable – Yoshikage Kira, "Kosaku Kawajiri"
- Crayon Shin-chan – Hiroshi Nohara (stand-in for Keiji Fujiwara)
- Bungou Stray Dogs – Edgar Allan Poe

2017

- Black Clover – Julius Novachrono
- Oushitsu Kyoushi Haine – Viktor von Glanzreich
- Star-Myu: High School Star Musical 2 – Asaki Uozumi
- Welcome to the Ballroom – Kaname Sengoku
- Made in Abyss – Bondrewd
- Sengoku Night Blood – Nobunaga Oda
- The Ancient Magus' Bride – Simon Kalm
- Rin-ne – Otobe (Episode 70)

2018

- 6 Lovers – Kagami Keiichi
- A Certain Magical Index III – Fiamma of The Right
- Banana Fish – Blanca
- Black Clover – Julius Novachrono
- Mr. Tonegawa: Middle Management Blues – Yukio Tonegawa
- Lord of Vermilion: The Crimson King – Akaya Inuki

2019

- Black Clover – Julius Novachrono
- Meiji Tokyo Renka – Charlie
- Demon Slayer: Kimetsu no Yaiba – Kagaya Ubuyashiki
- Ultramarine Magmell – Shūin
- Star-Myu: High School Star Musical 3 - Asaki Uozumi
- Over Drive Girl 1/6 – Ozma
- Wise Man's Grandchild – Oliver Schtrom
- Fruits Basket – Kazuma Soma
- Special 7: Special Crime Investigation Unit – Sakon Zeroemon "Boss" Kiryūin
- Assassins Pride – Oyagi

2020

- Black Clover – Julius Novachrono
- Kingdom 3 – Ri Boku
- Komatta Jii-san – Narrator
- Marudase Kintarō – Kintarō
- Shadowverse – Leon Auransh

2021

- Hortensia Saga – Jim McNeil, Adel
- Mushoku Tensei: Jobless Reincarnation – Paul Greyrat
- Seven Knights Revolution: Hero Successor – Chris
- One Piece – Scopper Gaban
- Digimon Ghost Game – Aviel Kyogoku/Vamdemon (Episode 25)
- So I'm a Spider, So What? – Potimas Harrifenas
- Peach Boy Riverside – Hiko
- Doraemon – Communications Officer of the Dorayaki Planet (Doraemon Birthday Special 2021)
- Fena: Pirate Princess – Abel Bluefield
- The World's Finest Assassin Gets Reincarnated in Another World as an Aristocrat – Cian
- Platinum End – Nanato Mukaido

2022

- A Couple of Cuckoos – Sōichirō Amano
- Made in Abyss: The Golden City of the Scorching Sun – Bondrewd
- Eternal Boys – Daisuke Yamanaka
- Bleach: Thousand-Year Blood War – Isshin Kurosaki, Kaname Tōsen

2023

- Buddy Daddies – Kyūtarō Kugi
- Giant Beasts of Ars – Jiiro
- High Card – Greg Young
- My Hero Academia 6 – Hikage Shinomori
- The Marginal Service – Zeno Stokes
- The Most Heretical Last Boss Queen – Albert
- Four Knights of the Apocalypse – Ironside
- Undead Unluck – Fan

2024

- The Witch and the Beast – Ashaf
- Welcome Home – Hiromu Fujiyoshi
- Kinnikuman: Perfect Origin Arc – Akuma Shogun
- Ranma ½ – Tōfū Ono

2025

- Promise of Wizard – Figaro
- Sorairo Utility – Tetsuhiro "Tetsu" Tanaka
- My Hero Academia: Vigilantes – Christopher Skyline / Captain Celebrity
- Hell Teacher: Jigoku Sensei Nube – Kyosuke Tamamo
- Gachiakuta – Regto
- Night of the Living Cat – Gunslinger
- Dusk Beyond the End of the World – Oboro
- A Gatherer's Adventure in Isekai – Clayston

2026

- The Darwin Incident – Gilbert Stein
- Kaya-chan Isn't Scary – Kaya-Papa (Shizuo Satō)
- Black Torch – Amagi
- I Became a Legend After My 10 Year-Long Last Stand – Erik

=== Original net animation (ONA) ===
- The King of Fighters: Destiny (2017) – Jeff Bogard
- Obsolete (2019) – Miyajima
- Cagaster of an Insect Cage (2020) – Mario
- Resident Evil: Infinite Darkness (2021) – Leon S. Kennedy
- Tekken: Bloodline (2022) – Hwoarang
- Devil May Cry (2025) – Dante
- Tatsuki Fujimoto Before Chainsaw Man (2025) – Hayasaka-sensei

=== Original video animation (OVA) ===
- 801 T.T.S. Airbats (1994) – Akizuki Kazuaki
- Battle Skipper (1995) – Todo
- Final Fantasy VII: Advent Children (2005) – Sephiroth
- Haru wo Daiteita (2005) – Iwaki Kyousuke
- Kenichi: The Mightiest Disciple (2014) – Christopher Eclair
- Kirepapa (2008) – Takatsukasa Chihiro
- Last Order: Final Fantasy VII (2005) – Sephiroth
- Moldiver (1993) – Hiroshi Ozora
- Mudazumo Naki Kaikaku (2010) – Koizumi Junichiro
- Otaku no Video (1991) – Iiyama
- Please Save My Earth (1993) – Jinpachi Ogura
- Princess Rouge (1997) – Raiga
- Tales of Phantasia: The Animation (2006) – Dhaos
- Tales of Symphonia: The Animation (2007) – Yuan
- Tekkaman Blade II (1994) – Aiba Takaya "D-Boy"/Tekkaman Blade
- Tenshi Nanka Ja Nai (1994) – Akira Sudô
- Tokyo Revelation (1995) – Yousuke Miura
- Ultraman: Super Fighter Legend (1996) – Ultraman
- Wild Adapter (2002) – Kubota Makoto
- Close the Last Door (2007) – Honda Kenzou
- Winter Cicada (2007) – Keiichirou Akizuki
- Kaitō Queen wa Circus ga Osuki (2022) – White Face

=== Theatrical animation ===
- Slam Dunk (1994) – Yohei Mito
- Slam Dunk: Conquer the Nation, Hanamichi Sakuragi! (1994) – Yohei Mito
- Slam Dunk: Shohoku's Greatest Challenge! (1995) – Yohei Mito
- Slam Dunk: Howling Basketman Spirit!! (1995) – Yohei Mito
- Doraemon: Nobita and the Galaxy Super-express (1996) – Custodian
- Tenchi Muyo! in Love (1996) – Young Nobuyuki Masaki
- Inuyasha the Movie: The Castle Beyond the Looking Glass (2002) – Naraku
- Konjiki no Gash Bell!! Movie 1: Unlisted Demon 101 (2004) – Wiseman
- Final Fantasy VII: Advent Children (2005) – Sephiroth
- Bleach: Memories of Nobody (2006) – Isshin Kurosaki
- Vexille (2007) – Kisaragi
- Bleach: The DiamondDust Rebellion (2007) – Isshin Kurosaki
- King of Thorn (2010) – Marco Owen
- Naruto Shippuden The Movie: The Lost Tower (2010) – Minato Namikaze
- Fullmetal Alchemist: The Sacred Star of Milos (2011) – Atlas, Melvin Voyager
- Sengoku Basara: The Last Party (2011) – Katakura Kojuro
- Road to Ninja: Naruto the Movie (2012) – Minato Namikaze
- Resident Evil: Damnation (2012) – Leon S. Kennedy
- Space Pirate Captain Harlock (2013) – Isora
- Saint Seiya: Legend of Sanctuary (2014) – Sagittarius Aioros
- Gekijōban Meiji Tokyo Renka: Yumihari no Serenade (2015) – Charlie
- Ajin: Shōtotsu (2016) – Almeyda
- Crayon Shin-chan: Invasion!! Alien Shiriri (2017) – Hiroshi Nohara
- Resident Evil: Vendetta (2017) – Leon S. Kennedy
- Crayon Shin-chan: Burst Serving! Kung Fu Boys ~Ramen Rebellion~ (2018) – Hiroshi Nohara
- Batman Ninja (2018) – Two-Face
- Even if the World Will End Tomorrow (2019) – Shū Izumi
- Crayon Shin-chan: Honeymoon Hurricane ~The Lost Hiroshi~ (2019) – Hiroshi Nohara
- The Saga of Tanya the Evil: The Movie (2019) – William Douglas Drake
- The Royal Tutor (2019) – Viktor von Glanzreich
- My Tyrano: Together, Forever (2020)
- Made in Abyss: Dawn of the Deep Soul (2020) – Bondrewd
- Detective Conan: The Scarlet Bullet (2021) – Shukichi Haneda
- Belle (2021) – Justin
- Crayon Shin-chan: Shrouded in Mystery! The Flowers of Tenkazu Academy (2021) – Hiroshi Nohara
- Isekai Quartet: The Movie – Another World (2022) – Alec Hoshin
- Toku Touken Ranbu: Hanamaru ~Setsugetsuka~ (2022) – Onimaru Kunitsuna
- Look Back (2024) – Man from 4-koma
- Dive in Wonderland (2025) – Cheshire Cat
- The Obsessed (2025) – Dadan

=== Television drama ===
- Maybe Koi ga Kikoeru (2023) – Koichiro Banba

=== Tokusatsu ===
- Zyuden Sentai Kyoryuger (2013–2014) – Wise God Torin (eps. 1 - 32, 34 - 48)/Kyouryu Silver (eps. 36 - 45) (Voice)/Torii (ep. 43) (Actor), Demon Sword Priest Mad Torin (ep. 36, 46) (Voice)
- Zyuden Sentai Kyoryuger: Gaburincho of Music (August 3, 2013) – Wise God Torin
- Zyuden Sentai Kyoryuger vs. Go-Busters: The Great Dinosaur Battle! Farewell Our Eternal Friends (January 18, 2014) – Wise God Torin / Kyouryu Silver
- Zyuden Sentai Kyoryuger Returns: Hundred Years After (June 20, 2014) – Origin Wise God Torin / Kyouryu Silver
- Ressha Sentai ToQger vs. Kyoryuger: The Movie (January 18, 2015) – Torin
- Power Rangers Dino Force Brave (2017 Japan) – Torin
- Kamen Rider: Beyond Generation – Khufu Crisper

=== Drama CDs ===
- Abunai series 3: Abunai Bara to Yuri no Sono – Izumi Sudou
- Datte Maou-Sama wa kare ga Kirai-Kamiko
- Abunai series 4: Abunai Campus Love – Takesaki
- Abunai series 5: Abunai Shiawase Chou Bangaihen – Izumi Sudou, Toshiyuki Oosawa
- Adult Education: Shinshi Chokyo – Tomoe Kyouishi
- Akuma no Himitsu – Zahan
- Aiso Tsukashi – Kyousuke Sawaragi
- Aitsu to Scandal series 1 – Kimichika Kotobuki
- Aitsu to Scandal series 2: Houkago wa Scandal – Kimichika Kotobuki
- Aitsu to Scandal series 3: Gakuensai wa Scandal – Kimichika Kotobuki
- Analyst no Yuutsu series 2: Koi no Risk wa Hansenai – Jeffery S Willis
- Analyst no Yuutsu series 3: Yuuwaku no Target Price – Jeffery S Willis
- Analyst no Yuutsu series 5: Ai no Rating AAA – Jeffery S Willis
- Answer series 1 – Takaaki Mashiba
- Answer series 2: Suggestion – Takaaki Mashiba
- Ao no Kiseki series 1: Ao no Kiseki – Sanshirou
- Ao no Kiseki series 2: Catharsis Spell – Sanshirou
- Ao no Kiseki series 3: Crystal Crown – Sanshirou
- Ao no Kiseki series 4: Baroque Pearl – Sanshirou
- Ao no Kiseki series 5: Persona Non Grata – Sanshirou
- Ao no Kiseki series 6: Phantom Pain – Sanshirou
- Bad Boys! – Eikichi Yazaki
- Boku no Gingitsune – Rei Akitsushima
- Boku no Mono ni Narinasai series 2: Kimi no Tonaride Nemurasete – Kageaki Uesugi
- Boku no Mono ni Narinasai series 3: Ikeru Tokomade Ikouyo – Kageaki Uesugi
- Boku no Mono ni Narinasai series 4: Kitto Junai Toiunowa... – Kageaki Uesugi
- Boku no Koe – Hideyumi Kurosawa
- Catch Me! – Kouichi Takahara
- Close the Last Door – Kenzo Honda
- Corsair series – Ayace Malik
- Damasaretai – Rihito Katase
- Devil May Cry: The Animated Series – Dante
- Ecstasy wa Eien ni ~Utsukushiki Rougoku~ – Hiraiwa
- Eden wo Tooku ni Hanarete series 1: Kami yo, Izuko no Rakuen – Masaomi Katou
- Eden wo Tooku ni Hanarete series 2: Ryokuin no Rakuen – Masaomi Katou
- Eden wo Tooku ni Hanarete series 3: Setsunai Yoru no Rakuen – Masaomi Katou
- Embracing Love – Kyosuke Iwaki
- Endless series – Yuuri Masaki
- Executive Boy – Kyouichirou Mayumura
- Gaki no Ryoubun series 2: Hasumi Koukou – Kazumasa Mutou
- Gaki no Ryoubun series 3: Saikyou Hiiruzu – Kazumasa Mutou
- Gaki no Ryoubun series 4: Uwasa no Shinzui – Kazumasa Mutou
- Gaki no Ryoubun series 5: Akuun no Jouken – Kazumasa Mutou
- Gakuen Heaven – Hideaki Nakajima
- Gerard & Jacques – Gerard
- Gin no Requiem – Lucian
- Happy Time – Tokimune Tatsumi
- Hana Wa Saku Ka – Sakurai Kazuaki
- Honoka na Koi no Danpen wo – Yunagi
- Into Your Heart Through the Door – Kenzo Honda
- Jigoku Meguri – Enma the 2nd
- Jounetsu no Young Man – Hidenori
- Kedamono series – Kazuaki Murase
- Kiken ga Ippai – Chiya Shimazu
- Kimi to Te wo Tsunaide – Takahiro Nakai
- Koi no series 4: Koi no Topping – Kouta Jinnai
- Koi no Annainin – Hirotaka Takaoka
- Koi no Karasawagi series – Takatoshi Nishihara
- Koi no Shinsatsushitsu 2 – Keigo Yuuki
- Koishikute – Tomohiro Hayama
- Koisuru Jewelry Designer series 1 – Masaki Kurakawa
- Koisuru Jewelry Designer series 2: Kare to Diamond – Masaki Kurakawa
- Komatta Toki ni wa Hoshi ni Kike – Kiyomine Hosaka
- Kuroshitsuji – Sebastian Michaelis
- Kyo Kara Maoh! – Conrad Weller
- La Vie En Rose – Kouichi Utsuki
- Lamento -BEYOND THE VOID- – Rai
  - Lamento -BEYOND THE VOID- DRAMA CD Vol.1-Vol.3 (2007-2008)
  - Drama CD Lamento -BEYOND THE VOID- Rhapsody to the past (2009)
  - Lamento -BEYOND THE VOID- Drama CD Love Love Lamento Gakuen (2009)
  - Lamento -BEYOND THE VOID- Asato Figure Bonus Drama CD (2007)
  - Lamento -BEYOND THE VOID- Bardo Figure Bonus Drama CD (2007)
  - Lamento -BEYOND THE VOID- Konoe Figure Bonus Drama CD (2007)
  - Lamento -BEYOND THE VOID- Rai Figure Bonus Drama CD (2007)
  - convenience store LAMENTO (2011-2012)
  - CHiRAL CAFE e Youkoso 1 (2010) & 2 (2016)
- Mahou Gakuen series 1: Binetsu Club – Wynn
- Mahou Gakuen series 2: Himitsu Garden – Wynn
- Mahou Gakuen series 3: Mugen Palace – Wynn
- Mahou Gakuen series 4: Yuuwaku Lesson – Wynn
- Mahou Gakuen Series side story: Daiundoukai Zenyasai – Wynn
- Manatsu no Higaisha 1 & 2 – Ryuuichi Ookura
- Mirage of Blaze series 4: Washi yo, Tarega Tameni Tobu – Umegi
- Mo Dao Zu Shi/Ma Dou So Shi - Lan Xichen/Ran Gishin
- Mou Ichido Only You – Hiroto Arisa
- Munasawagi series – Yuuji Takano
- My Sexual Harassment series 2: Yume Kamoshirenai – Youhei Fujita
- My Sexual Harassment series 3 – Youhei Fujita
- N-Dai Fuzoku Byouin series – Ryuuji Chinozaki
- News Center no Koibito – Takeyuki Jinno
- Oishii Karada – Yoshihisa Asakura
- Onegai Darlin' – Hiroshi Aihara
- Ore no Mono! – Yagami Katsuragi
- Osananajimi – Yamazaki
- Otokogokoro – Hiroyasu Saki
- Otokonoko niwa Himitsu ga Aru – Kaguya Tsukishiro
- Ouchou Haru no Yoi no Romance – Moroe Fujiwarano
- Pinky Wolf – Sou Nishimori
- Pretty Babies – Kyouichi Mikuni
- Pretty Baby series 1 & 2 – Kiichi Hiura
- Punch Up! – Junsuke Aki
- Rien no Kikoushi – Souichirou Tokiwa/Real name: Takamasa
- Rijichou-sama no Okiniiri – Takamasa Hayase
- Rossellini Ke no Musuko Ryakudatsusha – Leonardo Rossellini
- Saint Seiya – Leo Aiolia
- Sakurazawa vs Hakuhou series 1: Shokuinshitsu de Naisho no Romance – Toshiaki Yaginuma
- Sakurazawa vs Hakuhou series 2: Houkengo no Nayameru Kankei – Toshiaki Yaginuma
- Samurai Shodown: Warriors Rage – Haomaru
- Shiawase ni Dekiru series 1–5 – Yukihiko Honda
- Shiawase ni Shite Agemasu – Aki Shinohara
- Shinsengumi Mokuhiroku Wasurenagusa – Yamazaki Susumu
- Shiritsu Araiso Koto Gakko Seitokai Shikkobu – Makoto Kubota
- Shiritsu Takizawa Koukou Seitokai – Keisuke Fujimoto
- Shizuku Hanabira Ringo No Kaori – Shuusaku Nakagawa
- Shosen Kedamono Series 1: Shosen Kedamono – Kyouichi Giou
- Shosen Kedamono Series 2: Youko Nitsumaru – Kyouichi Giou
- Shosen Kedamono Series 3: Ryuuou no Hanayome – Kyouichi Giou
- Shosen Kedamono Series side story 1: Ryuuou no Hanayome Tokubetsuhen – Yuuya Momokawa
- Shounen Yonkei
- Slavers series – Takanari Saeki
- Sono Kuchibiru ni Yoru no Tsuyu – Kyouichi Wakae
- Soryamou Aideshou series 1 & 2 – Kazuhiro Hioki
- Sugar Code – Oodoi
- Super Lovers – Haru Kaido
- Teito Shinshi Kurabu – Kouichirou Takaoka
- Thanatos no Futago series 1: Thanatos no Futago 1912 – Viktor Ivanovich Kaverin
- Thanatos no Futago series 2: Thanatos no Futago 1917 – Viktor Ivanovich Kaverin
- Tora Nii-san to Wanko-san – Gintora
- Tora-san to Ookami-san – Gintora
- Touch Me Again – Takumi Sagata
- Tsuki no Sabaku Satsujin Jiken – Natsuhiko Minowa
- Tsumitsukuri na Kimi – Hiroshi Takamine
- Wagamama Prisoner – Kyousuke Ikusawa
- Wanko to Nyanko series – Atsushi Hasegawa
- Wild Adapter – Makoto Kubota
- Wild Rock – Emba
- Yami no Matsuei series 1 – Seiichirou Tatsumi
- Yami no Matsuei series 2: Summer Vacation – Seiichirou Tatsumi
- Yome ni Konaika – Keigo Ikezaki
- Yurigaoka Gakuen series 1: Heart mo Ace mo Boku no Mono – Riku Houjou
- Yurigaoka Gakuen series 2: Kimidake no Prince ni Naritai – Riku Houjou, Kaname Matsumiya
- Yuuwaku Recipe – Hongo
- Ze – Shoi Mito
- Zone-00-II section Knight – Renji Kurobara

=== Video games ===
Year	Title	Role	Notes	Source
1992	Knuckle Heads	Takeshi Fujioka		
1994	Popful Mail	Kazyr	Mega CD version	
1997	Tekken 3	Hwoarang		
1998	Dragon Force II	Bartz		
1998	Real Bout Fatal Fury Special: Dominated Mind	Bob Wilson, Hon Fu		
1998	Street Fighter Alpha 3	Ryu, Charlie		
1998	Soulcalibur	Heishirō Mitsurugi		
1998	Thousand Arms	Schmidt		
2000	Persona 2: Eternal Punishment	Kei Nanjo		
2001	Inuyasha	Naraku		
2002	Soulcalibur II	Heishirō Mitsurugi		
2002	Shinobi	Moritsune		
2002	Ore no Shita de Agake	Keiichiro Yoshioka		
2003	SNK vs. Capcom: SVC Chaos	Ryu		
2003	Tales of Symphonia	Yuan		
2005	Namco × Capcom	Heishirō Mitsurugi, Ryu		
2005	Soulcalibur III	Heishirō Mitsurugi		
2005	Kingdom Hearts II	Sephiroth		
2006	Lamento -BEYOND THE VOID-	Rai		
2007	Crisis Core: Final Fantasy VII	Sephiroth		
2008	Soulcalibur IV	Heishirō Mitsurugi		
2008	Dissidia Final Fantasy	Sephiroth		
2008	Tatsunoko vs. Capcom: Ultimate All-Stars	Tekkaman Blade		
2010	Kingdom Hearts Birth by Sleep	The Prince		
2010	The Legend of Heroes: Trails from Zero	Arios Maclaine		
2011	Marvel vs. Capcom 3: Fate of Two Worlds	Dante		
2011	Dissidia 012 Final Fantasy	Sephiroth		
2011	The Legend of Heroes: Trails to Azure	Arios Maclaine		
2011	Ultimate Marvel vs. Capcom 3	Dante		
2012	Soulcalibur V	Heishirō Mitsurugi		
2012	Project X Zone	Dante		
2012	Yakuza 5	Tatsuo Shinada		
2013	Resident Evil 6 Special Package	Leon S. Kennedy		
2013	JoJo's Bizarre Adventure: All Star Battle	Diavolo		
2015	Diabolik Lovers: Dark Fate	Carla Tsukinami		
2015	Devil May Cry 4: Special Edition	Dante		
2015	Dragon's Dogma Online	Pawn (Male)		
2015	Project X Zone 2	Dante, Leon S. Kennedy, Black Hayato		
2015	Dissidia Final Fantasy NT	Sephiroth		
2015	JoJo's Bizarre Adventure: Eyes of Heaven	Diavolo		
2015	Tokyo Xanadu	Gorou Saeki		
2016	Breath of Fire 6	Klaus		
2016	Tales of Berseria	Eizen		
2017	Dissidia Final Fantasy: Opera Omnia	Sephiroth		
2017	Nioh	Hanzo Hottori		
2017	Itadaki Street: Dragon Quest and Final Fantasy 30th Anniversary	Sephiroth		
2017	Shin Megami Tensei: Strange Journey Redux	Mastema		
2018	Soulcalibur VI	Heishirō Mitsurugi		
2019	Resident Evil 2	Leon S. Kennedy		
2019	Devil May Cry 5	Dante		
2019	Teppen	Dante		
2019	Pokémon Masters	Lance		
2019	A Certain Magical Index: Imaginary Fest	Fiamma of the Right		
2020	Nioh 2	Hanzo Hottori		
2020	Final Fantasy VII Remake	Sephiroth		
2020	JoJo's Bizarre Adventure: Last Survivor	Yoshikage Kira		
2020	Fate/Grand Order	Ashiya Dōman		
2020	The Legend of Heroes: Trails into Reverie	Arios Maclaine		
2021	Alchemy Stars	Jola, Hydrad		
2021	Shin Megami Tensei V	Aogami		
2022	JoJo's Bizarre Adventure: All Star Battle R	Yoshikage Kira, "Kosaku Kawajiri"		
2022	Crisis Core: Final Fantasy VII Reunion	Sephiroth		
2022	Fitness Boxing 2	Leo		
2023	Resident Evil 4	Leon S. Kennedy		
2023	Final Fantasy VII: Ever Crisis	Sephiroth		
2024	Final Fantasy VII Rebirth	Sephiroth		
2024	Iwakura Aria	Amane Iwakura		
2024	Reynatis	Soukuu Makabe		
2024	Wuthering Waves	Calcharo		
2024	Reverse Collapse: Code Name Bakery	William		
2025	Bleach: Rebirth of Souls	Kaname Tōsen, Isshin Kurosaki		
2025	The First Berserker: Khazan	Khazan		
2025	Shuten Order	Mikotoru/Mikoto		
2026	Resident Evil Requiem	Leon S. Kennedy		
2026	Zenless Zone Zero	Severian		
2026	Dissidia Duellum Final Fantasy	Sephiroth		
2026	Marvel Tōkon: Fighting Souls	Cyclops		
2026	Final Fantasy Resonance	Sephiroth		

- Street Fighter Alpha (1995) – Charlie
- Soul Edge (1995) – Heishirō Mitsurugi (Arcade Version)
- Street Fighter Alpha 2 (1996) – Charlie
- X-Men vs. Street Fighter (1996) – Charlie
- Marvel Super Heroes vs. Street Fighter (1997) – Charlie
- Rival Schools (1997) – Roberto Miura
- Marvel vs. Capcom: Clash of Super Heroes (1998) – Ryu, Charlie
- Street Fighter EX2 (1998) – Hayate
- Tekken Tag Tournament (1999) – Hwoarang
- Street Fighter EX2 Plus (1999, 2000) – Hayate
- Marvel vs. Capcom 2: New Age of Heroes (2000) – Charlie, Hayato, Ryu [Shin Shoryuken battle cry]
- Capcom vs. SNK: Millennium Fight 2000 (2000) – Ryu, Hon Fu
- Capcom Fighting Jam (2000) – Ryu
- Capcom vs. SNK 2: Millionaire Fighting 2001 (2001) – Ryu, Hon Fu
- Tekken 4 (2001) – Hwoarang
- Tekken Advance (2001) – Hwoarang
- Kingdom Hearts (2002) – Sephiroth
- Soulcalibur Legends (2007) – Heishirō Mitsurugi
- Soulcalibur: Broken Destiny (2009) – Heishirō Mitsurugi
- Granblue Fantasy (2014) – Seruel
- Fire Emblem Heroes (2017) – Sigurd
- Onmyōji (2018) – Minamoto no Yorimitsu
- Promise of Wizard (2019) – Figaro Garcia
- Touken Ranbu (2020) – Onimaru Kunitsuna
- Shin Megami Tensei Nocturne HD Remaster (2020) – Dante (Maniax DLC)
- HELIOS Rising Heroes (2020) – Jay Kidman
- Super Smash Bros. Ultimate (2020) – Sephiroth
- Shin Megami Tensei V (2021) – Aogami
- Fire Emblem Engage (2023) – Sigurd

Other Titles

- Another Century's Episode 2 – Gen-Ichiro Tsukuomi
- Another Century's Episode 3: The Final – Shagia Frost, Gen-Ichiro Tsukuomi
- Another Century's Episode: R – Kyosuke Nanbu
- Apocripha/0 – Jade Davis
- Ar tonelico III – Hikari Gojo
- Are you Alice? – White Knight
- Assassin's Creed II (Japanese version) – Leonardo da Vinci
- Assassin's Creed: Brotherhood (Japanese version) – Leonardo da Vinci
- BioShock (Japanese version) – Atlas
- Black Wolves Saga: Bloody Nightmare – Arles V. Felnoir
- Black Wolves Saga: Last Hope – Arles V. Felnoir
- Bleach: Soul Resurrección – Isshin Kurosaki
- Bloody Call – Jin
- Brave Story: New Traveler – Kee Keema
- Diabolik Lovers: Dark Fate – Carla Tsukinami
- Everybody's Golf – Daryl
- Final Fantasy Tactics Advance (Radio drama) – Adramelech
- Front Mission 5: Scars of the War – Walter Feng
- Gakuen Heaven – Nakajima Hideaki
- God Eater 2 – Gilbert Mclane
- Growlanser III: The Dual Darkness – Vincent Kreuzweir
- Infamous Second Son – Reggie Rowe
- Infinite Space – Yuri, the Man
- Knuckle Heads – Takeshi Fujioka
- Kyo Kara Maoh! Oresama Quest – Conrad Weller; PC version
- Kyo Kara Maoh! Hajimari no Tabi – Conrad Weller; PlayStation 2 version
- Love 365: Star-Crossed Myth – Zyglavis
- Naruto: Gekitō Ninja Taisen! 4 – Kimimaro
- Naruto Shippūden: Gekitō Ninja Taisen! Special – Minato Namikaze
- Naruto: Ultimate Ninja 3 – Kimimaro
- Naruto Shippūden: Ultimate Ninja 4 – Kimimaro
- Naruto Shippūden: Ultimate Ninja 5 – Kimimaro
- Naruto Shippuden: Ultimate Ninja Heroes 3 – Minato Namikaze
- Naruto Shippuden: Ultimate Ninja Impact – Minato Namikaze
- Naruto: Ultimate Ninja Storm – Kimimaro
- Naruto Shippuden: Ultimate Ninja Storm 2 – Minato Namikaze
- Naruto Shippuden: Ultimate Ninja Storm Generations – Minato Namikaze, Kimimaro
- Naruto Shippuden: Ultimate Ninja Storm 3 – Minato Namikaze
- Naruto Shippuden: Ultimate Ninja Storm 4 – Minato Namikaze
- One Piece: Gigant Battle 2 - Shinsekai – Enel
- Persona 2: Eternal Punishment – Kei Nanjo
- Plasma Sword: Nightmare of Bilstein – Hayato Kanzaki
- Resident Evil: Operation Raccoon City – Leon S. Kennedy
- Resident Evil: Revelations 2 – Leon S. Kennedy
- Sengoku Basara series – Katakura Kojūrō
- Silent Bomber – Jutah Fate
- Spider-Man: Shattered Dimensions – Spider-Man Noir
- Super Robot Wars Impact – Kyousuke Nanbu
- Super Robot Wars Original Generations – Kyousuke Nanbu
- Super Robot Wars Original Generation Gaiden – Kyousuke Nanbu
- Super Smash Bros. Ultimate – Sephiroth
- Taisen Puzzle-Dama – Ryo
- Tales of Phantasia – Dhaos; Game Boy Advance and PlayStation Portable versions
- Tales of Symphonia: Dawn of the New World – Yuan
- Tales of Vesperia – Toki wo Kakeru Otoko
- Tokimeki Memorial Girl's Side: 2nd Kiss – Wakaouji Takafumi
- Tomb Raider: The Angel of Darkness (Japanese Edition) – Kurtis Trent
- Vay – Heibelger / Sandor

== Dubbing roles ==
=== Voice-double ===
- Ewan McGregor
  - Little Voice – Billy
  - Rogue Trader – Nick Leeson
  - Star Wars: Episode I – The Phantom Menace – Obi-Wan Kenobi
  - Black Hawk Down – SPC John "Grimesey" Grimes
  - Star Wars: Episode II – Attack of the Clones – Obi-Wan Kenobi
  - Big Fish – Edward Bloom (young)
  - Star Wars: Episode III – Revenge of the Sith – Obi-Wan Kenobi
  - Stay – Dr. Sam Foster
  - Stormbreaker – Ian Rider
  - Incendiary – Jasper Black
  - Amelia – Gene Vidal
  - I Love You Phillip Morris – Phillip Morris
  - The Men Who Stare at Goats – Bob Wilton
  - Beginners – Oliver
  - The Ghost Writer – The Ghost
  - Nanny McPhee and the Big Bang – Rory Green
  - Haywire – Kenneth
  - Salmon Fishing in the Yemen – Alfred "Fred" Jones
  - The Impossible – Henry Bennett
  - Jack the Giant Slayer – Elmont
  - Son of a Gun – Brendan Lynch
  - Mortdecai – Inspector Martland
  - Star Wars: The Force Awakens – Obi-Wan Kenobi
  - Miles Ahead – Dave Braden
  - Jane Got a Gun – John Bishop
  - Zoe – Cole
  - Doctor Sleep – Danny Torrance
  - Star Wars: The Rise of Skywalker – Obi-Wan Kenobi
  - Birds of Prey – Roman Sionis / Black Mask
  - Staged – Ewan McGregor
  - Halston – Halston
  - The Birthday Cake – Father Kelly
  - Obi-Wan Kenobi – Obi-Wan Kenobi
  - Guillermo del Toro's Pinocchio – Sebastian J. Cricket
  - A Gentleman in Moscow – Count Alexander Ilyich Rostov
  - The End of Oak Street – Greg Platt
- Keanu Reeves
  - Chain Reaction (1999 TV Asahi edition) – Eddie Kasalivich
  - The Matrix (2002 Fuji TV edition) – Thomas Anderson/Neo
  - The Replacements – Shane Falco
  - The Watcher – David Allen Griffin
  - Sweet November – Nelson Moss
  - The Matrix Reloaded (2006 Fuji TV edition) – Thomas Anderson/Neo
  - The Matrix Revolutions (2007 Fuji TV edition) – Thomas Anderson/Neo
  - Constantine (2008 TV Asahi edition) – John Constantine
  - Thumbsucker – Dr. Perry Lyman
  - The Lake House – Alex Wyler
  - Street Kings – Detective Tommy "Tom" Ludlow
  - The Day the Earth Stood Still – Klaatu
  - Henry's Crime – Henry Torne
  - 47 Ronin – Kai
  - John Wick – John Wick
  - Knock Knock – Evan Webber
  - Exposed – Detective Scott Galban
  - The Whole Truth – Richard Ramsay
  - The Bad Batch – the Dream
  - John Wick: Chapter 2 – John Wick
  - To the Bone – Dr. William Beckham
  - Destination Wedding – Frank
  - Replicas – William Foster
  - Siberia – Lucas Hill
  - Always Be My Maybe – Keanu Reeves
  - Between Two Ferns: The Movie – Keanu Reeves
  - John Wick: Chapter 3 – Parabellum – John Wick
  - Toy Story 4 – Duke Caboom
  - The SpongeBob Movie: Sponge on the Run – The Sage
  - Bill & Ted Face the Music – Theodore "Ted" Logan
  - John Wick: Chapter 4 – John Wick
  - Sonic the Hedgehog 3 – Shadow the Hedgehog
  - Ballerina – John Wick
  - Toy Story 5 – Duke Caboom
- Adam Sandler
  - Billy Madison – Billy Madison
  - Happy Gilmore – Happy Gilmore
  - Bulletproof – Archie Moses
  - The Wedding Singer (In-flight edition) – Robbie Hart
  - Big Daddy – Sonny Koufax
  - Mr. Deeds – Longfellow Deeds
  - Eight Crazy Nights – Davey Stone, Whitey Duvall, Eleanore Duvall
  - Punch-Drunk Love – Barry Egan
  - Anger Management – David "Dave" Buznik
  - 50 First Dates – Henry Roth
  - Spanglish – John Clasky
  - The Longest Yard – Paul "Wrecking" Crewe
  - Click – Michael Newman
  - Bedtime Stories – Skeeter Bronson
  - You Don't Mess with the Zohan – Zohan Dvir
  - The Cobbler – Max Simkin
  - The Ridiculous 6 – Tommy "White Knife" Dunson Stockburn
  - The Do-Over – Max Kessler
  - Sandy Wexler – Sandy Wexler
  - The Meyerowitz Stories – Danny Meyerowitz
  - The Week Of – Kenny Lustig
  - Murder Mystery – Nick Spitz
  - Uncut Gems – Howard Ratner
  - Hubie Halloween – Hubie Dubois
  - Murder Mystery 2 – Nick Spitz
  - Spaceman – Jakub Procházka
- Tom Cruise
  - Top Gun (2009 TV Tokyo edition) – Lt. Pete "Maverick" Mitchell
  - Born on the Fourth of July (2003 DVD edition) – Ron Kovic
  - Interview with the Vampire (2025 BS10 Star Channel edition) – Lestat de Lioncourt
  - Mission: Impossible (2003 TV Asahi edition) – Ethan Hunt
  - Eyes Wide Shut – Dr. William "Bill" Harford
  - Mission: Impossible 2 (2006 TV Asahi edition) – Ethan Hunt
  - The Last Samurai – Captain Nathan Algren
  - Collateral – Vincent
  - War of the Worlds – Ray Ferrier
  - Mission: Impossible III – Ethan Hunt
  - Lions for Lambs – Senator Jasper Irving
  - Tropic Thunder – Les Grossman
  - Valkyrie – Colonel Claus von Stauffenberg
  - Knight and Day – Roy Miller/Matthew Knight
  - Mission: Impossible – Ghost Protocol – Ethan Hunt
  - Jack Reacher – Jack Reacher
  - Oblivion – Commander Jack Harper
  - Edge of Tomorrow – Major William Cage
  - Mission: Impossible – Rogue Nation – Ethan Hunt
  - Jack Reacher: Never Go Back – Jack Reacher
  - The Mummy – Nick Morton
  - American Made – Barry Seal
  - Mission: Impossible – Fallout – Ethan Hunt
  - Top Gun: Maverick – Capt. Pete "Maverick" Mitchell
  - Mission: Impossible – Dead Reckoning Part One – Ethan Hunt
  - Mission: Impossible – The Final Reckoning – Ethan Hunt
  - Digger – Digger Rockwell
- Owen Wilson
  - Shanghai Noon – Roy O'Bannon
  - Zoolander – Hansel McDonald
  - Around the World in 80 Days (2008 TV Tokyo edition) – Wilbur Wright
  - Wedding Crashers – John Beckwith
  - Night at the Museum – Jedediah Smith
  - Marley & Me – John Grogan
  - Night at the Museum: Battle of the Smithsonian – Jedediah Smith
  - The Big Year – Kenny Bostick
  - Midnight in Paris – Gil Pender
  - The Internship – Nick Campbell
  - Night at the Museum: Secret of the Tomb – Jedediah Smith
  - No Escape – Jack Dwyer
  - Zoolander 2 – Hansel McDonald
  - Wonder – Nate Pullman
  - Marry Me – Charlie Gilbert
  - Paint – Carl Nargle
- Jude Law
  - Cold Mountain – W. P. Inman
  - Sleuth – Milo Tindle
  - The Imaginarium of Doctor Parnassus – Imaginarium Tony 2
  - Sherlock Holmes – John Watson
  - Repo Men – Remy
  - Sherlock Holmes: A Game of Shadows – John Watson
  - Dom Hemingway – Dom Hemingway
  - Side Effects – Dr. Jonathan Banks
  - Spy – Bradley Fine
  - The Young Pope – Pope Pius XIII
  - Fantastic Beasts: The Crimes of Grindelwald – Albus Dumbledore
  - Captain Marvel – Yon-Rogg
  - The New Pope – Pope Pius XIII
  - Fantastic Beasts: The Secrets of Dumbledore – Albus Dumbledore
  - Peter Pan & Wendy – Captain Hook
- Martin Freeman
  - Sherlock – Dr. John Watson
  - The Hobbit: An Unexpected Journey – Bilbo Baggins
  - The Hobbit: The Desolation of Smaug – Bilbo Baggins
  - Fargo – Lester Nygaard
  - The Hobbit: The Battle of the Five Armies – Bilbo Baggins
  - The Eichmann Show – Milton Fruchtman
  - Captain America: Civil War – Everett K. Ross
  - Whiskey Tango Foxtrot – Iain MacKelpie
  - Cargo – Andy Rose
  - Ghost Stories – Mike Priddle
  - Black Panther – Everett K. Ross
  - Black Panther: Wakanda Forever – Everett K. Ross
  - Secret Invasion – Everett K. Ross
- Brendan Fraser
  - Encino Man – Linkovich "Link" Chomovsky
  - Airheads – Chester "Chaz Darby" Ogilvie
  - The Scout – Steve Nebraska
  - Dudley Do-Right – Dudley Do-Right
  - The Mummy – Richard "Rick" O'Connell
  - Bedazzled – Elliot Richards
  - Monkeybone – Stu Miley
  - The Mummy Returns – Richard "Rick" O'Connell
  - Looney Tunes: Back in Action – D.J. Drake
  - Journey to the End of the Night – Paul
  - The Mummy: Tomb of the Dragon Emperor – Richard "Rick" O'Connell
- Mark Wahlberg
  - The Big Hit – Melvin Smiley
  - The Corruptor – Detective Danny Wallace
  - Planet of the Apes (2005 NTV edition) – Capt. Leo Davidson
  - The Italian Job – Charlie Croker
  - The Happening – Elliot Moore
  - The Fighter – Micky Ward
  - 2 Guns – Michael "Stig" Stigman
  - The Gambler – Jim Bennett
  - Deepwater Horizon – Mike Williams
  - Uncharted – Victor "Sully" Sullivan
  - Flight Risk – The Pilot / Daryl Booth
- Paul Walker
  - The Fast and the Furious – Brian O'Conner
  - Joy Ride (2006 TV Tokyo edition) – Lewis Thomas
  - 2 Fast 2 Furious – Brian O'Conner
  - Into the Blue – Jared
  - Flags of Our Fathers – Hank Hansen
  - The Death and Life of Bobby Z – Tim Kearney
  - The Lazarus Project – Ben Garvey
  - Brick Mansions – Damien Collier
- Chris O'Donnell
  - The Three Musketeers (1998 TV Asahi edition) – D'Artagnan
  - Mad Love – Matt Leland
  - In Love and War – Ernest "Ernie" Hemingway
  - Batman & Robin (2000 TV Asahi edition) – Dick Grayson/Robin
  - The Bachelor (2003 TV Asahi edition) – Jimmie Shannon
  - Cookie's Fortune – Jason Brown
  - NCIS: Los Angeles – G. Callen
  - Hawaii Five-0 – G. Callen
- Josh Hartnett
  - Blow Dry – Brian Allen
  - Town & Country – Tom Stoddard
  - Sin City – The Salesman
  - The Black Dahlia – Dwight 'Bucky' Bleichert
  - 30 Days of Night – Eben Oleson
  - August – Tom Sterling
  - Bunraku – The Drifter
  - Oppenheimer – Ernest Lawrence
- Brad Pitt
  - The Favor (1999 TV Tokyo edition) – Elliot Fowler
  - Se7en (2001 TV Asahi edition) – Detective David Mills
  - The Devil's Own (2000 NTV and 2002 TV Asahi editions) – Francis Austin McGuire
  - Snatch (2017 Blu-ray edition) – 'One Punch' Mickey O'Neil
  - Spy Game (2005 TV Tokyo edition) – Tom Bishop
  - The Mexican (2004 TV Asahi edition) – Jerry Welbach
  - Burn After Reading – Chad Feldheimer
- Heath Ledger
  - 10 Things I Hate About You – Patrick Verona
  - The Four Feathers – Harry Faversham
  - Ned Kelly – Ned Kelly
  - Brokeback Mountain – Ennis del Mar
  - The Brothers Grimm – Jakob Grimm
  - The Imaginarium of Doctor Parnassus – Tony
- Colin Farrell
  - American Outlaws – Jesse James
  - The Recruit – James Douglas Clayton
  - S.W.A.T. – Officer Jim Street
  - The Imaginarium of Doctor Parnassus – Imaginarium Tony 3
  - Total Recall – Douglas Quaid/Karl Hauser
  - Artemis Fowl – Artemis Fowl I
  - Thirteen Lives – John Volanthen
- Joaquin Phoenix
  - Signs – Merrill Hess
  - It's All About Love – John
  - Ladder 49 – Jack Morrison
  - Hotel Rwanda – Jack Daglish
  - The Village – Lucius Hunt
  - Beau Is Afraid – Beau Wassermann
  - Eddington – Joe Cross

=== Live-action ===
- The Air Up There – Buddy Gibson (Keith Gibbs)
- Alex Rider – Ian Rider (Andrew Buchan)
- Alien: Covenant – Jacob Branson (James Franco)
- Aliens (2003 DVD edition) – Corporal Dwayne Hicks (Michael Biehn)
- Alien vs. Predator – Sebastian De Rosa (Raoul Bova)
- Alita: Battle Angel – Dr. Dyson Ido (Christoph Waltz)
- American Graffiti (2011 Blu-Ray edition) – Steve Bolander (Ron Howard)
- The Andromeda Strain – Dr. Jeremy Stone (Benjamin Bratt)
- Any Given Sunday (2004 TV Asahi edition) – "Steamin" Willie Beamen (Jamie Foxx)
- Argo – Tony Mendez (Ben Affleck)
- Armour of God – Alan (Alan Tam)
- Assassination – Yem Sek-jin (Lee Jung-jae)
- Avengers: Doomsday - Victor von Doom / Doctor Doom (Robert Downey Jr.)
- Awake – John Doe / Detective Michael Winslow (Jonathan Rhys Meyers)
- Bachelor Party 2: The Last Temptation – Ron (Josh Cooke)
- Back to the Future (2025 NTV edition) – George McFly (Crispin Glover)
- Back to the Future Part II (2025 NTV edition) – George McFly (Jeffrey Weissman)
- Back to the Future Part III (2025 NTV edition) – George McFly (Jeffrey Weissman)
- Bad Times at the El Royale – Billy Lee (Chris Hemsworth)
- Bangkok Dangerous – Kong (Chakrit Yamnam)
- Beetlejuice Beetlejuice – Rory (Justin Theroux)
- Below (2005 TV Tokyo edition) – Ensign Douglas Odell (Matthew Davis)
- Between Two Ferns: The Movie – Peter Dinklage
- Big Trouble – Puggy (Jason Lee)
- Black Dog (2002 NTV edition) – Sonny (Gabriel Casseus)
- Black Rain (2008 DVD edition) – Detective Charlie Vincent (Andy García)
- Boiling Point – Andy Jones (Stephen Graham)
- Book of Shadows: Blair Witch 2 – Jeffrey Patterson (Jeffrey Donovan)
- Blood and Wine – Jason (Stephen Dorff)
- Blow – George "Boston George" Jung (Johnny Depp)
- Bounce – Buddy Amaral (Ben Affleck)
- Broadchurch – Detective Inspector Alec Hardy (David Tennant)
- Brotherhood of Blades – Shen Lian (Chang Chen)
- Brotherhood of Blades II: The Infernal Battlefield – Shen Lian (Chang Chen)
- Captain America: Brave New World – Samuel Sterns / Leader (Tim Blake Nelson)
- Cecil B. Demented – Sinclair/Cecil B. Demented (Stephen Dorff)
- Con Air (2000 TV Asahi edition) – U.S. Marshal Vince Larkin (John Cusack)
- Counterpart – Peter Quayle (Harry Lloyd)
- Crouching Tiger, Hidden Dragon – Lo "Dark Cloud" (Chang Chen)
- The Crow – Tin Tin (Laurence Mason)
- Cruel Intentions – Ronald Clifford (Sean Patrick Thomas)
- Cruel Intentions 3 – Jason Argyle (Kerr Smith)
- Crossworlds – Steve (Jack Black)
- Daddy Day Camp – Lance Warner (Lochlyn Munro)
- Das Experiment – Tarek Fahd (Moritz Bleibtreu)
- Deadwater Fell – Tom Kendrick (David Tennant)
- Death of Me – Neil (Luke Hemsworth)
- Deep Impact – Dr. Oren Monash (Ron Eldard)
- Deep Rising (2000 TV Asahi edition) – Billy (Clint Curtis)
- The Defenders – Pete Kaczmarek (Jerry O'Connell)
- Deliver Us from Evil – Butler (Joel McHale)
- Dharma & Greg – Gregory "Greg" Clifford Montgomery (Thomas Gibson)
- Dick – John Dean (Jim Breuer)
- Don't Be Afraid of the Dark – Alex Hurst (Guy Pearce)
- dot the i – Barnaby F. Caspian (James D'Arcy)
- Dragon Blade – Captain (Xiao Yang)
- Dragon Lord – Cowboy Chin (Mars)
- Drop Dead Diva – Grayson Kent (Jackson Hurst)
- Dune – Duke Leto Atreides (Oscar Isaac)
- Dungeons & Dragons: Honor Among Thieves as Stunhard corpse
- Edward Scissorhands (1994 TV Asahi edition) – Jim (Anthony Michael Hall)
- ER – Chris Law (Joe Torry)
- Evening – Harris Arden (Patrick Wilson)
- The Evening Star – Bruce (Scott Wolf)
- Executive Decision (1999 TV Asahi edition) – Master Sergeant Carlos "Rat" Lopez (John Leguizamo)
- The Expendables 2 – Billy "The Kid" Timmons (Liam Hemsworth)
- Eye of the Beholder (2004 TV Asahi edition) – Gary (Jason Priestley)
- F1 – Peter Banning (Tobias Menzies)
- Fantastic Four (2008 NTV edition) – Reed Richards/Mr. Fantastic (Ioan Gruffudd)
- Fight Club (2003 Fuji TV edition) – The Narrator (Edward Norton)
- Fire Down Below (2000 TV Asahi edition) – Orin Hanner, Jr (Brad Hunt)
- FlashForward – FBI Special Agent Mark Benford (Joseph Fiennes)
- Flash Gordon – Flash Gordon (Eric Johnson)
- Flight Risk – Winston (Topher Grace)
- Flightplan – Gene Carson (Peter Sarsgaard)
- Flying Swords of Dragon Gate – Yu Huatian and Wind Blade (Chen Kun)
- Friday Night Lights – Mike Winchell (Lucas Black)
- Game of Thrones – Tyrion Lannister (Peter Dinklage)
- The Game Plan – Kyle Cooper (Hayes MacArthur)
- Gangs of New York – Amsterdam Vallon (Leonardo DiCaprio)
- Georgia Rule – Simon Ward (Dermot Mulroney)
- Ghostbusters – Kevin Beckman (Chris Hemsworth)
- Girlfight – Adrian Sturges (Santiago Douglas)
- Glee – Will Schuester (Matthew Morrison)
- The Godfather (2008 Blu-ray and DVD editions) – Michael Corleone (Al Pacino)
- The Godfather Part II (2008 Blu-ray and DVD editions) – Michael Corleone (Al Pacino)
- Godzilla – Niko "Nick" Tatopolis (Matthew Broderick)
- Gogol. The Beginning – Nikolai Gogol (Alexander Petrov)
- Gogol. Viy – Nikolai Gogol (Alexander Petrov)
- Gogol. Terrible Revenge – Nikolai Gogol (Alexander Petrov)
- Gone Girl – Nick Dunne (Ben Affleck)
- Goodbye Christopher Robin – A. A. Milne (Domhnall Gleeson)
- The Great Gatsby – Jay Gatsby (Robert Redford)
- Gridlock'd – Ezekiel "Spoon" Whitmore (Tupac Shakur)
- Guernica – Henry (James D'Arcy)
- Harsh Times – Jim Davis (Christian Bale)
- Heart and Souls – John McBride (Sean O'Bryan)
- Heartbreakers – Jack Withrowe (Jason Lee)
- Herbie: Fully Loaded – "Trip" Murphy (Matt Dillon)
- His Dark Materials – Iorek Byrnison
- Home Alone (1998 TV Asahi edition) – Buzz McCallister (Devin Ratray)
- Home Alone 2: Lost in New York (1996 TV Asahi edition) – Buzz McCallister (Devin Ratray)
- Home Alone 3 (2019 NTV edition) – Burton Jernigan (Lenny Von Dohlen)
- The Hot Chick – Billy (Matthew Lawrence)
- Hypnotic – Danny Rourke (Ben Affleck)
- I Care a Lot – Roman Lunyov (Peter Dinklage)
- I Know What You Did Last Summer (2000 TV Asahi edition) – Ray Bronson (Freddie Prinze Jr.)
- I Still Know What You Did Last Summer (2002 TV Asahi edition) – Ray Bronson (Freddie Prinze Jr.)
- IF – Banana (Bill Hader)
- The Imaginarium of Doctor Parnassus – Imaginarium Tony 1 (Johnny Depp)
- The Incredible Hulk – Samuel Sterns (Tim Blake Nelson)
- Independence Day – Captain Steven Hiller (Will Smith)
- Iron Man 2 – Justin Hammer (Sam Rockwell)
- Iron Will – Will Stoneman (Mackenzie Astin)
- John Tucker Must Die – Scott Tucker (Penn Badgley)
- K-19: The Widowmaker – Petty Officer Pavel Loktev (Christian Camargo)
- Kate & Leopold (2006 NTV edition) – Charlie McKay (Breckin Meyer)
- Keeping the Faith – Rabbi Jacob "Jake" Schram (Ben Stiller)
- The King and the Clown – Jang-saeng (Kam Woo-sung)
- Kinky Boots – Charlie Price (Joel Edgerton)
- Knockaround Guys – Matty Demaret (Barry Pepper)
- Last Days – Scott (Scott Patrick Green)
- Legally Blonde (2005 NTV edition) – Emmett Richmond (Luke Wilson)
- Legion – Gabriel (Kevin Durand)
- Leonardo – Ludovico Sforza (James D'Arcy)
- Life as We Know It – Eric Messer (Josh Duhamel)
- Little House on the Prairie (2019 NHK BS4K edition) – Charles Ingalls (Michael Landon)
- A Love Song for Bobby Long – Lawson Pines (Gabriel Macht)
- Made in America – Tea Cake Walters (Will Smith)
- A Man Apart (2007 TV Tokyo edition) – DEA Agent Demetrius Hicks (Larenz Tate)
- Manifest – Benjamin "Ben" Stone (Josh Dallas)
- Mars Attacks (2000 TV Tokyo edition) – Jason Stone (Michael J. Fox)
- The Merchant of Venice – Bassanio (Joseph Fiennes)
- Mermaids – Joe Porretti (Michael Schoeffling)
- A Million Ways to Die in the West – Albert Stark (Seth MacFarlane)
- Mindhunters – J.D. Reston (Christian Slater)
- The Mists of Avalon – Lancelot (Michael Vartan)
- Moonshot – Leon Kovi (Zach Braff)
- Munich – Avner Kaufman (Eric Bana)
- The Next Karate Kid – Eric McGowen (Chris Conrad)
- Nick of Time – Gene Watson (Johnny Depp)
- Night of the Living Dead – TV Newscaster (Charles Craig)
- No Man's Land (1999 TV Tokyo edition) – Ted Varrick (Charlie Sheen)
- Northern Exposure – Ed Chigliak (Darren E. Burrows)
- The Notebook – Lon Hammond, Jr. (James Marsden)
- October Sky – Jim Hickam (Scott Miles)
- Painted Skin: The Resurrection – Huo Xin (Chen Kun)
- Pawn Shop Chronicles – Richard (Matt Dillon)
- Perfect Stranger – Miles Haley (Giovanni Ribisi)
- Phat Girlz – Dr. Tunde Jonathan (Jimmy Jean-Louis)
- Police – Charlie, Convict 999 (Charlie Chaplin)
- Prison Break – James Whistler (Chris Vance)
- Public Enemies – J. Edgar Hoover (Billy Crudup)
- It's a Very Merry Muppet Christmas Movie – Daniel (David Arquette), John Dorian (Zach Braff)
- Redline – Carlo (Nathan Phillips)
- Reindeer Games (2002 TV Asahi edition) – Nick Cassidy (James Frain)
- Resident Evil: Retribution (2014 TV Asahi edition) – Leon S. Kennedy (Johann Urb)
- Ride with the Devil – Jack Bull Chiles (Skeet Ulrich)
- Rollerball – Jonathan Cross (Chris Klein)
- Romeo + Juliet (2000 TV Asahi edition) – Tybalt Capulet (John Leguizamo)
- Running Wild with Bear Grylls – Joel McHale
- Sahara (2007 TV Tokyo edition) – Al Giordino (Steve Zahn)
- Scary Movie – Ray Wilkins (Shawn Wayans)
- Scary Movie 2 – Ray Wilkins (Shawn Wayans)
- Scary Movie (2026) – Ray Wilkins (Shawn Wayans)
- Scream – Stuart Macher (Matthew Lillard)
- SEAL Team – Master Chief Special Warfare Operator Jason Hayes (David Boreanaz)
- Sex Tape – Jay Hargrove (Jason Segel)
- Shade – Vernon (Stuart Townsend)
- Sidekicks – Randy Cellini (John Buchanan)
- Simple Simon – Sam (Martin Wallström)
- Sister Act 2: Back in the Habit (1997 NTV edition) – Frankie (Devin Kamin)
- Sleepers – Thomas "Tommy" Marcano (Billy Crudup)
- Sleepwalkers – Charles Brady (Brian Krause)
- Son of the Mask (2009 NTV edition) – Loki (Alan Cumming)
- Sound of Freedom – Tim Ballard (Jim Caviezel)
- Spartacus – Antoninus (Tony Curtis)
- Speed Zone – Flash (Art Hindle)
- Spider-Man 3 – Eddie Brock/Venom (Topher Grace)
- Spy Kids: All the Time in the World – Wilbur Wilson (Joel McHale)
- Stand by Me – Ace Merrill (Kiefer Sutherland)
- Star Trek: Voyager – Tom Paris (Robert Duncan McNeill)
- Stealth – Henry Purcell (Jamie Foxx)
- Strays – Doug (Will Forte)
- Streets of Blood – Detective Andy Devereaux (Val Kilmer)
- Strictly Ballroom – Scott Hastings (Paul Mercurio)
- Sunset Heat (1997 TV Tokyo edition) – David (Charlie Schlatter)
- Survivor – Inspector Paul Anderson (James D'Arcy)
- Taegukgi – Lee Jin-tae (Jang Dong-gun)
- Team America: World Police – Gary Johnston (Trey Parker)
- Terminal Velocity (1997 TV Asahi edition) – Robocam (Suli McCullough)
- Tomorrowland – Hugo Gernsback (Keegan-Michael Key)
- Top Gun (2005 DVD edition) – LT Tom "Iceman" Kazansky (Val Kilmer)
- Trainspotting – Simon "Sick Boy" Williamson (Jonny Lee Miller)
- T2 Trainspotting – Simon "Sick Boy" Williamson (Jonny Lee Miller)
- The Tramp – The Tramp (Charlie Chaplin)
- True Lies (1996 Fuji TV edition) – Faisal (Grant Heslov)
- Ultraman: The Ultimate Hero – Kenichi Kai
- Under Siege 2: Dark Territory (1998 TV Asahi edition) – Bobby Zachs (Morris Chestnut)
- Unhook the Stars – Frankie Warren (David Thornton)
- The Untamed (trailer only) – Lan Xichen (Liu Haikuan)
- Up the Creek – Rex Crandall (Jeff East)
- U.S. Marshals (2001 TV Asahi edition) – Special Agent John Royce (Robert Downey Jr.)
- Venom: Let There Be Carnage – Patrick Mulligan (Stephen Graham)
- Venom: The Last Dance – Patrick Mulligan (Stephen Graham)
- A Violent Prosecutor – Byun Jae-wook (Hwang Jung-min)
- Volcano (2000 TV Asahi edition) – Emmit Reese (Don Cheadle)
- We Were Soldiers – 2nd Lieutenant Jack Geoghegan (Chris Klein)
- When in Rome – Nick Beamon (Josh Duhamel)
- Where the Heart Is – Willy Jack Pickens (Dylan Bruno)
- Wild Wild West – Captain Jim West (Will Smith)
- Windtalkers – Private Ben Yahzee (Adam Beach)
- Written on the Wind – Mitch Wayne (Rock Hudson)
- Young Detective Dee: Rise of the Sea Dragon – Doctor Wáng Pu (Chen Kun)
- The Young Victoria – Sir Robert Peel (Michael Maloney)
- Zapped Again! – Cecil (David Dohan)
- Zhong Kui: Snow Girl and the Dark Crystal – Zhong Kui (Chen Kun)

=== Animation ===
- The Addams Family 2 – Cyrus Strange
- Adventure Time – Marshall Lee
- Bad Cat – Riza
- The Boss Baby – Captain Ross
- The Brave Little Toaster – Radio
- A Christmas Carol – Fred Scrooge
- Cloudy with a Chance of Meatballs – Officer Earl Devereaux
- Horton Hears A Who! – Horton the Elephant
- Isle of Dogs – Spots
- The Lego Movie – Emmet Brickowski, Superman, Han Solo
- The Lego Movie 2: The Second Part – Emmet Brickowski, Rex Dangervest
- The Lord of the Rings: The War of the Rohirrim – Hama
- Raya and the Last Dragon – Chief Benja
- Walking with Dinosaurs – Scowler
- Resident Evil: Death Island – Leon S. Kennedy
- What If...? – Tony Stark / Iron Man
- Wonder Park – Peanut
- Zootopia – Nicholas P. "Nick" Wilde
