= Close the Last Door =

Manga series by Yugi Yamada

- Cover of Close the Last Door volume 1 as published by Biblos

最後のドアを閉めろ! (Saigo no Door wo Shimero!)
- Genre: Yaoi, Drama, Romance, Comedy
- Manga
- Written by: Yugi Yamada
- Published by: Biblos
- English publisher: NA: Digital Manga Publishing
- Magazine: Magazine Be × Boy
- Original run: 2001 – 2004
- Volumes: 2
- Original video animation
- Directed by: Tama
- Written by: Tama, Yugi Yamada
- Studio: Phoenix Entertainment
- Released: 2007
- Runtime: 30 minutes

Close the Last Door (Japanese: 最後のドアを閉めろ!, Hepburn: Saigo no Door wo Shimero!) is a yaoi manga series written by Yugi Yamada. It has been adapted into an OVA directed by Tama. It is licensed in North America by Digital Manga Publishing, which published the first volume in 2006.

== Plot ==
After being best man at his best friend's (Saitou Toshihisa) wedding, Nagai Atsushi realizes that he might never be with the man he loves, Saitou. Nagai, drowning in his sorrows and hatred for the new bride then meets Honda Kenzou, another guest at the wedding, a friend of the bride's. Honda took care of Nagai when he was dead drunk and now Nagai thinks he may have feelings for both men. Things start to get complicated when Saitou's bride runs off with another man and Saitou starts hitting on Nagai.

== Voice Actors ==
- Nagai Atsushi voiced by Kenichi Suzumura
- Saitou Toshihisa voiced by Kouichi Toochika
- Honda Kenzou voiced by Toshiyuki Morikawa

== Staff ==
- Director: Tama
- Storyboard: Tama
- Original Creator: Yugi Yamada
- Character design: Takepon
- Animation director: Takepon
- Sound Director: Tomohiro Yoshida

== Reception ==
Ed Chavez, writing for Mania Entertainment, described Yamada's character designs for her salarymen characters as being differentiated through "unique expressions and body language".
