= The Legend of the Gambler: Tetsuya =

Japanese manga series

- First tankōbon volume cover, featuring Tetsuya Asada

哲也 ―雀聖と呼ばれた男― (Tetsuya Jansei to Yobareta Otoko)
- Genre: Gambling; Mahjong
- Manga
- Written by: Fūmei Sai
- Illustrated by: Yasushi Hoshino
- Published by: Kodansha
- Magazine: Weekly Shōnen Magazine
- Original run: July 30, 1997 – December 8, 2004
- Volumes: 41
- Anime television series
- Directed by: Nobutaka Nishizawa
- Produced by: Kenji Ōta (chief); Iriya Azuma; Ken Fukuyoshi
- Written by: Yoshiyuki Suga
- Music by: Kuniaki Haishima
- Studio: Toei Animation
- Original network: TV Asahi
- Original run: October 7, 2000 – March 24, 2001
- Episodes: 20
- icon

The Legend of the Gambler: Tetsuya (Japanese: 哲也 ―雀聖と呼ばれた男―, Hepburn: Tetsuya Jansei to Yobareta Otoko) is a Japanese gambling manga series written by Fūmei Sai and illustrated by Yasushi Hoshino. It was serialized in Kodansha's shōnen manga magazine Weekly Shōnen Magazine from July 1997 to December 2004, with its chapters collected in 41 tankōbon volumes.

It was adapted by Toei Animation into a 20-episode anime television series, broadcast on TV Asahi from October 2000 to March 2001.

By August 2019, the manga had over 16 million copies in circulation. In 2000, The Legend of the Gambler: Tetsuya was awarded the 23rd Kodansha Manga Award in the shōnen category.

== Plot ==
In 1944, Tetsuya Asada was 15 years old. Three years after the attack on Pearl Harbor, Tetsuya was mobilized to work at a munitions factory. One day, he was with one of his lunch break friends and was being taught how to gamble by his colleague's uncle. At that time, an old man who survived without escaping in the tragedy of an air raid that turns the whole area into a burnt field teaches him that "unlucky people die". The following year, Japan lost the war and was in a poor situation. Tetsuya, who managed to get a job, is gambling at his workplace and was driven to the last minute by losing consecutively, showed his talent as a gamer. After meeting Inami at a gambling hall, Tetsuya heads for Yokosuka after hearing that he can make money by playing mahjong against American soldiers in Yokosuka.

== Media ==
=== Manga ===
Written by Fūmei Sai and illustrated by Yasushi Hoshino, Shōbushi Densetsu Tetsuya was serialized in Kodansha's shōnen manga Weekly Shōnen Magazine from July 30, 1997, to December 8, 2004. Kodansha compiled the series' individual chapters into 41 tankōbon volumes published from December 16, 1997, to February 17, 2005.

=== Anime ===
A 20-episode anime television series adaptation produced by Toei Animation, titled Shōbushi Densetsu Tetsuya (勝負師伝説哲也), was broadcast on TV Asahi from October 7, 2000, to March 24, 2001. (Note: TV Asahi listed the series air dates on Friday at 26:39, which is Saturday at 2:39 a.m. JST.)

=== Video games ===
- Shobushi Densetsu Tetsuya (PlayStation 2)
  - Shobushi Densetsu Tetsuya 2: Genjin Chojo Kessen (PlayStation 2)

== Reception ==
By August 2019, the manga had over 16 million copies in circulation. The Legend of the Gambler: Tetsuya won the 23rd Kodansha Manga Award for the shōnen category in 2000.

== See also ==
- Gambling in Japan
