= Knuckle Heads =

1993 video game

- Arcade flyer
- Developer: Namco
- Publisher: Namco
- Designers: O. Sugi; Captain Gan
- Composer: Takayuki Aihara
- Platform: Arcade
- Release: JP: March 1993; NA: April 1993
- Genre: Fighting
- Modes: Single-player, multiplayer
- Arcade system: Namco NA-2

Knuckle Heads (Note: Japanese: ナックルヘッズ, Hepburn: Nakkuru Hezzu) is a 1993 fighting video game developed and published by Namco for arcades. It was released in Japan in March 1993 and in North America in April 1993. The game was later re-released on the Virtual Console in Japan on August 18, 2009. Hamster Corporation released the game as part of their Arcade Archives series for the Nintendo Switch and PlayStation 4 in August 2024.

== Gameplay ==
In the single-player tournament mode, the player's chosen character fights an opponent in best two-out-of-three matches with the CPU or against another human player, but when both are knocked out simultaneously in the first round, one of them will win the second round. The player has a character roster of six fighters to choose from, each with their own weapons and special techniques. After the player knocks out five different characters, the player must fight two opponents at once instead of one, for three rounds, and finally an "evil" solid-gold version of their own character, before their character's own ending sequence. The most notable features are the jump button, and multiplayer mode which allows up to four players to play simultaneously, but the multiplayer mode does not have an ending (much like Cosmo Gang the Puzzle, which was released earlier in 1992 and also ran on Namco's NA-1 hardware), and the closest a player can get to winning it is if they win ninety-nine times because that is when their "WIN" counter will roll over.

== Characters ==
There are six playable characters and no bosses; all of them have their own unique statistics and special moves.

- Rob Vincent (ロブ・ビンセント, Robu Binsento) (voice actor: Nobuo Tobita): Born in Honolulu, 1964, measures 181 cm (5 ft 11 in) high, and weighs 84 kg (185 lb); he uses dual tonfas, and has the catchphrase of "I am No. 1!" when he wins.
- Takeshi Fujioka (タケシ・フジオカ (武 富士岡), Takeshi Fujioka) (voice actor: Toshiyuki Morikawa): From the game home country, he was born in Kyoto in 1967, measures 175 cm (5 ft 9 in) high, and weighs 75 kg (165 lb); he uses a kusarigama, and has a catchphrase of Aku wo kiru! (悪を斬るっ!) when he wins. His ending reveals himself to be an undercover investigator of the ICPO.
- Blat Vaike (ブラット・ヴェイク, Buratto Vēku) (voice actor: Takashi Yanagihara (柳原孝安)): Born in Athens in 1957, he measures 158 cm (5 ft 2 in) high, and weighs 70 kg (150 lb); he uses a hammer, and a catchphrase "Gyahahahaha!".
- Christine Myao (クリスティン・ミャオ, Kurisitin Myao) (voice actress: Megumi Hayashibara): Born Hong Kong in 1974, she measures 168 cm (5 ft 6 in) and weighs 43 kg (95 lb); she uses a quarterstaff, and has the catchphrase "Yeah!" on a win.
- Gregory Darrell (グレゴリー・ダレル, Guregorī Dareru) (voice actor: Nobuo Tobita, same as Vincent): Born in Lillehammer, 1953, he measures 216 cm (7 ft 1 in) high, and weighs 127 kg (280 lb); he uses dual axes and a catchphrase "Hahahaha!".
- Claudia Silva (クラウディア・シルバ, Kuraudia Shiruba) (voice actress: Kotono Mitsuishi): Born in São Paulo in 1969, she measures 172 cm (5 ft 8 in) high, but her weight is unknown; she uses steel claws, and a catchphrase "Come On Baby!"

== Reception ==
In Japan, Game Machine listed Knuckle Heads on their April 15, 1993 issue as being the seventh most-successful table arcade game of the year. RePlay reported Knuckle Heads to be the nineteenth most-popular arcade game at the time.
