= Kocchi Muite! Miiko =

Japanese manga and anime series

- Cover of the first volume of Kocchi Muite! Miiko as published by Shogakukan.

こっちむいて！みい子
- Genre: Comedy
- Manga
- Written by: Eriko Ono
- Published by: Shogakukan
- Magazine: Ciao
- Original run: 1995 – present
- Volumes: 39
- Anime television series
- Directed by: Takao Yoshizawa
- Music by: Michiaki Katō; Yasuhiko Fukuda
- Studio: Toei Animation
- Original network: TV Asahi
- Original run: February 14, 1998 – February 6, 1999
- Episodes: 42

Kocchi Muite! Miiko (Japanese: こっちむいて!みい子, Hepburn: Kotchi Muite! Miiko; lit. 'Look This Way, Miiko!') is a Japanese manga series by Eriko Ono. It has been published by Shogakukan in Ciao since 1995 and collected in 39 bound volumes. It is a sequel to an earlier series, Miiko desu! (みい子です!; "I'm Miiko!"), and depicts the home and school life of a cheerful and energetic fifth grade student named Miiko.

Kocchi Muite! Miiko was adapted as a 42-episode anime television series by Toei Animation, which was broadcast on TV Asahi from February 14, 1998, to February 6, 1999, as part of the Anime Syuukan DX! Mi-Pha-Pu anime series.

== Overview ==
This series is a heartwarming comedy that comically depicts the everyday lives of various characters, including Miiko Yamada, a first-year middle school girl.

Originally, Miiko and Mamoru were created as announcement manga characters for Shogakukan's Pyon Pyon magazine. Later, the one-shot manga was published in the June 1990 issue, and from the October 1990 issue to the final October 1992 issue, it was serialized under the title Miiko desu!. After Pyon Pyon was absorbed into Ciao, the series was transferred to Ciao and continued from the November 1992 issue to the December 1994 issue. Then, starting with the January 1995 issue, the title was changed and developed into the current Kocchi Muite! Miiko. As of December 2012, the series has sold over 3.8 million copies in total.

The main character Miiko and her classmates have remained fifth graders for over 25 years since the early serialization of Miiko desu!, when they advanced from fourth to fifth grade, without ever moving up. However, in Ciao's April 2016 issue (Chapter 244), they advanced to the sixth grade. Furthermore, in the April 2020 issue (Chapter 288), they graduated from elementary school and entered middle school.

The series enjoys enormous popularity in Indonesia. Among the female characters, Miiko is the most popular; among women who aspire to become manga artists, Mari is the most popular; and among the male characters, Tappei is the most popular. In 2013, a signing event was even held locally.

== Characters ==
Miiko Yamada (山田 みい子, Yamada Miiko)
The protagonist of the series, Miiko is an energetic schoolgirl with short stature. She is often found hanging out with her friends or fighting with a boy called Tappei, who seems to like Miiko, but was too shy to say it to her himself. He called her names instead and sometimes got on Miiko's nerves.
Mari Shimura (志村 まり, Shimura Mari)
Mari is Miiko's best friend who dreams of becoming a manga artist.
Tappei Eguchi (江口 辰平, Eguchi Tappei)
Tappei is a shy, yet annoying and nice boy in Miiko's class. He is her close male friend who seems to have a romantic interest towards her.
Yuuko Ogawa (小川 ゆう子, Ogawa Yuuko)
Yuuko is one of Miiko's friends who is friendly and intelligent. She is Kenta's girlfriend.
Kenta Sato (佐藤ケンタ, Satō Kenta)
Kenta is Tappei's best friend, with a cheerful and humorous personality. He is Yuuko's boyfriend.
Ikuya Yoshida (吉田郁也, Yoshida Ikuya)
Yoshida is a kind and good-looking student. He has a crush on Miiko, which sometimes leads him to fantasize about her.
Miho Tanimura (谷村ミホ, Tanimura Miho)
Miho is Miiko's classmate and the most beautiful girl in the class. She has a crush on Tappei.
Yoshiki Nomura (野村ヨシキ, Nomura Yoshiki)
Yoshiki is a quiet and eccentric boy, but also has a sensible side.
Yuka Kobayashi (小林ゆか, Kobayashi Yuka)
Yuka is Mamoru's classmate and girlfriend.
Akio Onishi (Mr. Onishi) (大西アキオ, Ōnishi Akio)
Mr. Onishi is Miiko's homeroom teacher from 4th to 6th grade.

=== Miiko's family ===
Mamoru Yamada (山田 まもる, Yamada Mamoru)
Mamoru is Miiko's younger brother. Unlike his sister, he is diligent and often teaches her when she struggles with homework. Mamoru likes helping his family, which sometimes got on his nerves.
Rie Yamada (山田 理絵, Yamada Rie)
Rie is Miiko's mother and is an editor of a magazine.
Kosuke Yamada (山田耕介, Yamada Kōsuke)
Kosuke is Miiko's father and is a newspaper reporter.
Momo Yamada (山田もも, Yamada Momo)
Momo is Miiko and Mamoru's younger sister.

== Media ==
=== Manga ===
Kocchi Muite! Miiko is written and illustrated by Eriko Ono. It has been published by Shogakukan in the shōjo manga magazine Ciao since 1995. The manga has been published in 39 tankōbon.

No.	Release date	ISBN
1	June 26, 1995	4-09-136571-X
2	December 13, 1995	4-09-136572-8
3	June 26, 1996	4-09-136573-6
4	March 26, 1997	4-09-136574-4
5	October 25, 1997	4-09-136575-2
6	June 25, 1998	4-09-136576-0
7	February 24, 1999	4-09-136577-9
8	June 22, 1999	4-09-136578-7
9	January 26, 2000	4-09-136579-5
10	October 26, 2002	4-09-136580-9
11	August 23, 2001	4-09-138111-1
12	July 26, 2002	4-09-138112-X
13	March 26, 2003	4-09-138113-8
14	January 26, 2004	4-09-138114-6
15	August 28, 2004	4-09-138115-4
16	April 27, 2005	4-09-138116-2
17	February 1, 2006	4-09-130298-X
18	December 27, 2006	4-09-130807-4
19	October 1, 2007	978-4-09-131259-4
20	July 25, 2008	978-4-09-131769-8
21	June 1, 2009	978-4-09-132345-3
22	April 28, 2010	978-4-09-133254-7
23	March 1, 2011	978-4-09-133635-4
24	March 30, 2012	978-4-09-134449-6
25	December 26, 2012	978-4-09-135119-7
26	November 1, 2013	978-4-09-135600-0
27	October 30, 2014	978-4-09-135600-0
28	October 1, 2015	978-4-09-137886-6
29	June 30, 2016	978-4-09-138604-5
30	June 29, 2017	978-4-09-139445-3
31	June 29, 2018	978-4-09-870189-6
32	April 26, 2019	978-4-09-870497-2
33	February 28, 2020	9784098707478
34	October 30, 2020	9784098711772
35	August 26, 2021	9784098714636
36	June 6, 2022	9784098716319
37	June 26, 2023	9784098721320
38	May 24, 2024	9784098725731
39	August 26, 2025	9784098732074

=== Anime ===
An anime television series adaptation was produced by Toei Animation and directed by Takao Yoshizawa. It aired for 42 episodes on TV Asahi from February 14, 1998, to February 6, 1999, as part of the Anime Syuukan DX! Mi-Pha-Pu anime series.

No.	Title	Original release date
1	"Leave it to Miiko!"; Transliteration: "Miiko ni Omakase!" (Japanese: みい子におまかせ！)	February 14, 1998
2	"Test is Hard!"; Transliteration: "Tesuto wa Tsurai yo!" (Japanese: テストはつらいよ！)	February 21, 1998
3	"I Wanna Catch a Cold!"; Transliteration: "Kaze Hikitāi!" (Japanese: カゼひきたーい！)	February 28, 1998
4	"Return My Sharp Pen!"; Transliteration: "Shāpu Pen Kaeshite!" (Japanese: シャープペン返して！)	March 7, 1998
5	"Miiko's Image Change!"; Transliteration: "Miiko Imechen!" (Japanese: みい子イメチェン！)	March 14, 1998
6	"I'm Sorry! Yukko-chan"; Transliteration: "Gomen ne! Yukko-chan" (Japanese: ごめんね！ユッコちゃん)	March 21, 1998
7	"Beware of April Fool's Day!"; Transliteration: "Eipuriru Fūru ni Chūi!" (Japanese: エイプリルフールに注意！)	March 28, 1998
8	"I'm the Class Representative!?"; Transliteration: "Atashi ga Gakkyū Iin!?" (Japanese: あたしが学級委員！？)	April 11, 1998
9	"Epic Diet War!"; Transliteration: "Daietto Taisaku Ikusa!" (Japanese: ダイエット大作戦！)	April 18, 1998
10	"I Wanna Own a Puppy!"; Transliteration: "Koinu Kaitāi!" (Japanese: 小犬飼いたーい！)	April 25, 1998
11	"Because It's a Birthday!"; Transliteration: "Tanjōbi Datteba!" (Japanese: 誕生日だってば！)	March 2, 1998
12	"Heart-pounding! H-shaped Photograph?"; Transliteration: "Doki-doki! H na Shashin?" (Japanese: ドキドキ！Hな写真？)	March 9, 1998
13	"Grandma Has Arrived!"; Transliteration: "Bāba ga Yatte Kita!" (Japanese: ばあばがやって来た!)	March 23, 1998
14	"Epic Doughnuts War!"; Transliteration: "Dōnatsu Taisaku Ikusa!" (Japanese: ドーナツ大作戦！)	March 30, 1998
15	"Mari-chan's Manga Road!"; Transliteration: "Mari-chan no Manga Michi!" (Japanese: まりちゃんのまんが道！)	June 6, 1998
16	"I Wanna Enter a Fan Club!"; Transliteration: "Fan Kurabbu ni Iritai!" (Japanese: ファンクラブに入りたい！)	June 13, 1998
17	"Let It Rip! Mamoru"; Transliteration: "Kattobase! Mamoru" (Japanese: かっとばせ！まもる)	June 20, 1998
18	"Do I Stink?"; Transliteration: "Atashi tte Kusai?" (Japanese: あたしってクサイ？)	June 27, 1998
19	"Who's the Culprit!?"; Transliteration: "Han'nin wa Dare da!?" (Japanese: 犯人は誰だ！？)	July 4, 1998
20	"I Wanna Write an Incredible Composition!"; Transliteration: "Sugoi Sakubun Kakitai!" (Japanese: すごい作文書きたい！)	July 11, 1998
21	"Swim! Mamoru-kun"; Transliteration: "Oyoge! Mamoru-kun" (Japanese: 泳げ！まもるくん)	July 18, 1998
22	"The Special Mystery of The Trio Alliance' Summer Vacation: The Tale of Mysterious Box"; Transliteration: "Sansaku Gattai Natsuyasumi Tokubetsu Misuterī: Fushigi na Hako no Monogatari" (Japanese: 三作合体夏休み特別ミステリー ふしぎな箱の物語)	July 25, 1998
23	"The Day Miiko Let It Out!"; Transliteration: "Miiko Porori！no Hi" (Japanese: みい子ポロリ！の日)	August 8, 1998
24	"Heart Pounding at the Summer Festival!"; Transliteration: "Natsumatsuri de Doki-doki!" (Japanese: 夏祭りでドキドキ！)	August 15, 1998
25	"Summer Vacation is a Life of Lunch!"; Transliteration: "Natsuyasumi wa Ohiru Gohan Inochi!" (Japanese: 夏休みはお昼ごはん命！)	August 22, 1998
26	"Summer Vacation is for Travel!"; Transliteration: "Natsuyasumi wa Ryokō damon!" (Japanese: 夏休みは旅行だもん！)	August 29, 1998
27	"Serious Chronicle in Great Edo"; Transliteration: "Ōedo Taihen Ki" (Japanese: 大江戸大変記)	September 12, 1998
28	"Announcement! The Person Miiko Likes"; Transliteration: "Happyō! Miiko no Suki na Hito" (Japanese: 発表！みい子の好きな人)	September 26, 1998
29	"I Cheated!"; Transliteration: "Kanningu Shichatta!" (Japanese: カンニングしちゃった！)	October 3, 1998
30	"It's an Athletic Meet! A Set of Three Fights!!"; Transliteration: "Undōkai desu! Sankumi Faito" (Japanese: 運動会です！三組ファイト！！)	October 10, 1998
31	"Mari's Ultimate Decision! Love vs. Manga"; Transliteration: "Mari Kyūkyoku no Sentaku! Koi to Manga" (Japanese: まり究極の選択！恋VS(と)マンガ)	October 17, 1998
32	"Older brother is Painful!"; Transliteration: "Aneki wa Tsurai yo!" (Japanese: アネキはつらいよ！)	October 31, 1998
33	"First Date at the Amusement Park!"; Transliteration: "Yuenchi de Hatsu Dēto!" (Japanese: 遊園地で初デート！)	November 14, 1998
34	"School Arts Festival! Rare 3-Headed Piglet"; Transliteration: "Gakugeikai! 3-hiki no Kobuta" (Japanese: 学芸会！3匹の子豚)	November 21, 1998
35	"Big Problems with a Fighting Couple!"; Transliteration: "Fūfu Genka de Dai Pinchi!" (Japanese: 夫婦ゲンカで大ピンチ!)	November 28, 1998
36	"A Hot Day of Midwinter!"; Transliteration: "Mafuyu no Hotto Dei!" (Japanese: 真冬のホットデイ！)	December 12, 1998
37	"Present of Tears!"; Transliteration: "Namida no Puresento!" (Japanese: 涙のプレゼント！)	December 19, 1998
38	"Serious Chronicle in Edo (Part 2)"; Transliteration: "Ōedo Taihen Ki 2" (Japanese: 大江戸大変記II)	January 9, 1999
39	"Yoshiki's Film Director Debut!"; Transliteration: "Yoshiki Eigakantoku Debyū!" (Japanese: ヨシキ映画監督デビュー！)	January 16, 1999
40	"The Liar is Hurt?"; Transliteration: "Usotsuki wa Itai?" (Japanese: うそつきは痛い？)	January 23, 1999
41	"First Skiing!"; Transliteration: "Hajimete no Sukī!" (Japanese: はじめてのスキー！)	January 30, 1999
42	"Bye Bye, Ryūhei-kun!"; Transliteration: "Bai Bai, Ryūhei-kun!" (Japanese: バイバイ竜平くん！)	February 6, 1999

== Reception ==
The manga received the 1996 Shogakukan Manga Award for children's manga. Together, the first 25 volumes have sold 3.8 million copies.
