= Anime Shūkan DX! Mi-Pha-Pu =

Japanese anime television series

- アニメ週刊DX! みいファぷー
- Created by: Fan Fan Pharmacy: Sachiko Kashiwaba; Shinji Araki
- Based on: Heli-Tako Pū-chan by Takemaru Sasaki; Kocchi Muite! Miiko by Eriko Ono; Nyarome by Fujio Akatsuka
- Developed by: Fan Fan Pharmacy: Chiaki J. Konaka
- Screenplay by: Kocchi Muite! Miiko: Ryōta Yamaguchi
- Directed by: Fan Fan Pharmacy and Pu-chan: Yukio Kaizawa; Kocchi Muite! Miiko: Takao Yoshizawa
- Music by: Akio Kosaka; Michiaki Kato; Yasuhiko Fukuda
- Country of origin: Japan
- Original language: Japanese
- No. of episodes: 48

Production
- Producers: Megumi Ueda (TV Asahi); Kouichi Yada (Toei Advertising); Iriya Azuma
- Production companies: TV Asahi; Toei Advertising; Toei Animation

Original release
- Network: ANN (TV Asahi)
- Release: February 14, 1998 – February 6, 1999

Anime Shūkan DX! Mi-Pha-Pu (アニメ週刊DX! みいファぷー, Anime Shūkan Derakusu! Mii Fa Pũ) is a Japanese anime series that combined episodes of three series, Fushigi Mahou Fan Fan Pharmacy (ふしぎ魔法 ファンファン・ファーマシィー; lit. Mysterious Magic Fan Fan Pharmacy), Heli-Tako Pū-chan (ヘリタコぷーちゃん; lit. Heli-Octopus Pū-chan) and Kocchi Muite! Miiko. Heli-Tako Pu-Chan was broadcast in 42 episodes, while Fushigi Mahou Fan Fan Pharmacy was broadcast in 48 episodes, both between February 14, 1998, and February 6, 1999.

The series had different protagonists and own plotlines, being completely unrelated to each other. The characters who introduced the segments were Nyarome and Kemunpas, characters from Mōretsu Atarō created by Fujio Akatsuka.

A manga adaptation of Fushigi Mahou Fan Fan Pharmacy by Mako Morie was serialized in Shogakukan's Ciao magazine from 1998 to 1999.
