= Iriya Azuma =

Japanese anime producer

Iriya Azuma (東 伊里弥, Azuma Iriya) (born 1963) is a Japanese anime producer notable for working on several of the Sailor Moon animated series.

== Anime involved in ==
- Air movie: Producer
- Goldfish Warning!: Producer
- Legendary Gambler Tetsuya: Producer
- Candy Candy (1992 movie): Planning
- Make-Up! Sailor Senshi: Planning
- Sailor Moon R Movie: Promise of the Rose: Planning
- Sailor Moon S Movie: Hearts in Ice: Planning
- Sailor Moon (1990s Anime series): Producer
- Cutie Honey Flash: Producer
- Anime Shūkan DX! Mi-Pha-Pu: Producer
- Phantom Thief Jeanne: Producer
