= Eberouge =

1997 video game

- Sega Saturn cover art
- Developer(s): Japan Media Programming
- Publisher(s): Takara
- Platform(s): Sega Saturn / PlayStation
- Release: JP: 30 May 1997
- Genre(s): Dating sim / Strategy
- Mode(s): Single-player

Eberouge (エーベルージュ, Ēberūju) is a 1997 video game developed by Japan Media Programming and published by Takara on the Sega Saturn and PlayStation in Japan. It is a dating sim game with similar gameplay and graphical representation to Konami's Tokimeki Memorial. It is based on a dating sim originally made by Fujitsu on home computers.

== Story and world setting ==
The story happens in a parallel world named EbeLand. The setting is similar to the medieval age in Europe. Magic is common and is a common subject taught in colleges. In this world, the ecosystem is originated and supported by a central huge tree. However, due to the overdevelopment of industries and use of fossil fuel, global warming is rampant. The huge tree is dying, which endangers the game world.

Long ago, this land was saved by the Goddess Ebe from total destruction, but years later, an archeologist among the survivors felt the balance of the land tipping again. So he created institutes to train a student that can create magic, as the Goddess did, to save the land once more.
