= List of Mobile Suit Gundam: Iron-Blooded Orphans characters =

This is a list of fictional characters from the Japanese anime series Mobile Suit Gundam: Iron-Blooded Orphans.

== Setting ==
The narrative begins over 300 years after the Calamity War (厄祭戦（やくさいせん）, Yakusaisen), a disastrous interplanetary conflict which caused more casualties and destruction than any previous war in human history and nearly brought the human race to the brink of self-induced extinction. Eventually, elements from several different factions united to form an international peacekeeping force, Gjallarhorn, to defeat all of the other factions and bring the war to an end. Gjallarhorn achieved this by producing advanced Gundam Mobile Suit Frames to dominate the battlefield, equipped with Ahab Reactors and Alaya Vijnana interfaces. The end of the war was marked by a shift to a new calendar system, becoming the first year of the "Post-Disaster" era. Some time before the Calamity War, Mars has been terraformed to the extent that it has a breathable atmosphere.

With the cooperation of remaining leaders from each surviving faction, Gjallarhorn reorganized Earth's political landscape into four powerful economic blocs. Meanwhile, each of the four power blocks was assigned a sector of Mars to rebuild and build up the Martian governmental structure from scratch. Gjallarhorn itself remained as a peacekeeping force, officially neutral, but ruthlessly crushing any who might threaten international stability again. It achieved this by maintaining a firm monopoly on Ahab Reactor production, though after the Calamity War itself production of new Gundam Frames (which were difficult to manufacture) was phased out - instead, subsequent generations shifted to using scaled-down, mass-produced versions of the concurrent and simpler Valkyrie Frame. To highlight the discrepancy, records show that the Gundams produced measured in the dozens, but the mass-produced models number in the hundreds. The mainstay of Gjallarhorn's forces are the Graze type Mobile Suit Frames, which utterly dominate the battlefield through superior technology and numbers.

The four major economic power blocs on Earth itself are:

- Arbrau (アーブラウ, Āburau): Consists of present-day Russia, Canada, and Alaska, straddling the Arctic Circle. Capital and parliament are located in Edmonton, Alberta, Canada. This economic bloc appears more prominently in the first season of the TV series than the others, because the Chryse colony on Mars is controlled by Arbrau. The name may be an acronym.
- Strategic Alliance Union (SAU): Consists of all of the Americas south of present-day Canada, including the territories of the present-day continental United States, Central America, and South America.
- Oceanian Federation (オセアニア連邦, Oseania Renpō): Consists of present-day China, Japan, Korea, southeast Asia and Indonesia, Australasia, and India (but not Pakistan).
- African Union (アフリカンユニオン, Afurika Yunion): Despite the name, the "African Union" actually consists of not only all of Africa, but Europe and the Middle East as well (it is possible that these later two regions were so badly devastated during the Calamity War that the African regions are considered the core territories; or simply that the largest territory gets the name, or a multitude of other reasons). Arbrau specifically only controls the territory of the Russian Federation as the borders existed at the beginning of the 21st century: Eastern Europe and the Central Asian states (north to Kazakhstan) are part of the African Union. Pakistan is also controlled by the African Union.

Having established stable political relations between these four economic blocs in the Inner Sphere of the Solar System (also known as the Earth Sphere), Gjallarhorn also set about ordering the Outer Sphere - primarily consisting of Mars and the Jupiter system (and possibly other settlements). Gjallarhorn evenly divided the territories of Mars and the rest of the Outer Sphere between the four different economic blocks for them to rebuild, so that each of the four control different locations on Mars, i.e. the Martian city-state Chryse is controlled by Arbrau.

In the subsequent three centuries, Gjallarhorn became increasingly ruthless and corrupt, and meddling in the internal politics of the four economic blocs. Power within Gjallarhorn also became dominated by seven major political dynasties (technically not holding official power, but almost like Zaibatsu). Meanwhile, Mars and the rest of the Outer Sphere became the literal Third World for Earth, their resources and raw materials feeding the wealth of the mother planet even as they struggled to survive. Serious economic disparity remained a major problem on Mars, where child labor, human trafficking in the form of child soldiers known as Human Debris, and ordinary child soldiers became commonplace. This in turn has led to civil unrest, but Gjallarhorn and major Earth-based companies keep the locals in line by hiring private military contractors as crowd control, the soldiers in many of which are child soldiers themselves. The heavy use of locally recruited mercenary companies allows the Earth power blocs to fight unrest by proxy, instead of having to spill their own blood for their economic interests on the planet. Over time the economic blocs from Earth have given at least some limited autonomy to their Mars colonies, but this largely exists on paper as neocolonialism through economic domination remains. By the beginning of the TV series in 323 P.D. many of the colonies on Mars such as Chryse are agitating for independence.

Several large megacorporations as well as large crime syndicates - sometimes indistinguishable from each other - also wield a fair amount of clandestine influence over political affairs and/or internal faction rivalries within the four Earth economic blocks and even the seven families of Gjallarhorn itself. Several large pirate groups also exist which Gjallarhorn hasn't made a concerted effort to destroy because they can be hired as mercenaries/military contractors.

The background of the TV series is loosely similar in several respects to that in the main Universal Century's Mobile Suit Zeta Gundam: the "Calamity War" was similar in scope to the One Year War from Universal Century, and Gjallarhorn is somewhat analogous to the Titans, a ruthless fascist organization enforcing Earth's hegemony over the outer colonies, to maintain peace (and thus, the political status quo) at any cost. Maps even show that a large circle of land in southeastern Australia is missing as a result of the Calamity War - matching how the same region of Australia was devastated by a colony drop in the Universal Century.

== Characters ==
=== Tekkadan ===
Tekkadan (鉄華団; lit. 'Iron Flower Brigade') is a mercenary group formed from the remnants of CGS by the members of the CGS's Third Corp, following the coup against the First Corp. Orga chose the name "Iron Flower" for them using the metaphor that despite their downtrodden status as child soldiers, like an iron flower, they can't be destroyed no matter how much people seek to crush them. Their current mission is to protect and escort Kudelia Aina Bernstein as she heads to Earth for secret negotiations. Due to Orga Itsuka's Sakazuki blood oath with Naze Turbine and later, McMurdo Barriston, the group becomes an official branch under Teiwaz. Arriving on Earth, Makanai also hires them to send him to the parliament as well with Kudelia. Following the completion of their job, Arbrau hires them as their military advisors. With a massive influx of funding from Teiwaz and eager recruits, they are able to create an Earth branch to advise Arbaur's military and as a whole they became a burgeoning company that is envied by all in their field of work. Befitting of their origin as abused child soldiers, the members who are formerly Human Debris have discarded their red-lined clothing and are treated equally by their leaders. Following the successive plots against them and their allies, orchestrated by Rustal Elion and Iok Kujan of Gjallarhorn, and Jasley Donomikols of Teiwaz, Tekkadan breaks ties with Teiwaz and the Admoss Company to join McGillis Fareed in his war to remove Rustal from power, with the promise of gaining the sovereignty over Mars once McGillis obtains full control over Gjallarhorn at the cost of being Arianrhod's scapegoats. With all their communications to the outside cut off and with Gjallarhorn's manipulation of the media making it seem they would not surrender, Tekkadan was forced to stage a final stand while secretly evacuating as many members as it could through a secret tunnel recently discovered. The group was believed to be eradicated once its base was completely destroyed by a rail gun barrage from orbit. With Orga's death and many of the combatants killed while the none-combatants evacuated, the organization has been disbanded while the survivors lived on under new identities crafted by Makanai in gratitude for their past assistance. With their base having been demolished by a rail gun barrage from orbit, all that remains as a tangible mark of their presence is a memorial stone covered with the names of their fallen near Sakura's farm.

Mikazuki Augus (三日月・オーガス, Mikazuki Ōgasu)
Voiced by: Kengo Kawanishi, Ayaka Suwa (childhood) (Japanese); Kyle McCarley, Karen Strassman (Young) (English)
The protagonist of the series, Mikazuki is an orphan child soldier working for CGS's Third Corp and primary pilot of the ASW-G-08 Gundam Barbatos. Often known by the nickname "Mika," he and Orga were childhood friends who would not hesitate to sacrifice their lives for each other or their comrades. His first name is "crescent moon" in Japanese. Though he has poor social skills and is uninterested in romance, he excels in piloting and combat and focuses solely on developing his skills while protecting his friends. He is utterly ruthless against his enemies and is also shown to sometimes lose himself in anger. In some cases, he will even enter a berserker-like state if enraged and can only be snapped out by those close to him. For example, he nearly chokes Gaelio Bauduin to death when he is thought to have hurt Cookie and Cracker Griffon, only stopping when Biscuit's grandmother snaps him out of it. He also has a rather cold outlook on life due to his role as a child soldier. He solely views the world as a place of allies to protect and enemies to eradicate; with no room for concepts like duels or sparing defeated adversaries. Like other members of the Third Corp, he received man-machine interface implants known as the Alaya-Vijnana System, also known as "Whiskers," on his spine to improve his spatial skills and reactions in the cockpit while piloting. While having just one implant is risky (out of a group of ten that included Mikazuki and Orga, only six were successfully augmented unscathed), he was able to receive three and survive, making him the prime candidate for piloting the Gundam Barbatos. He has a habit of eating Mars palms (火星ヤシ, Kasei yashi), ordinarily sweet plum-like fruits with a rare chance of being repulsively bitter. Mikazuki, like most members of Tekkadan, is initially illiterate, but Kudelia offers to teach him and some of the younger men how to read and write. He dreams of eventually becoming a simple farmer like Biscuit's grandmother once he can teach himself with books. While on Earth, he deals with a lot of frustrating situations such as Biscuit's death. And while he managed to avenge him by killing Carta Issue, he and Orga know it won't be over until Tekkadan meet Makanai's request to escort him to Edmonton for the parliament election in Canada. While Orga sent both Kudelia and Makanai to the parliament, Mikazuki faces a vengeful Ein and manages to activate Barbatos' full potential to kill him by fully syncing his body to the Mobile Suit. In aftermath of the battle, he entirely loses the sensation in his right arm along with a portion of the vision in his right eye while not linked to Barbatos.
After Tekkadan's first successful mission he is appointed as Commando Unit Leader, earning the nickname "Devil of Tekkadan" (鉄華団の悪魔, Tekkadan no Akuma) from his enemies, with Atra as his personal chauffeuse. Using knowledge he read up after learning to read, he tries planting new seeds and crops at Sakura's farm. While they have all withered and died, he hasn't given up and plans to experiment more. After subduing the Mobile Armor Hashmal, he has become paralyzed in the entire right half of his body except when he is connected to his Gundam's Alaya-Vijnana system. Because of this, he believes that he can no longer live without fighting and refuses to let Orga take responsibility for his multiple impediments. After learning Orga got shot down, he decides to lead Tekkadan and fight till the end so the others could live. He ultimately dies from mortal injuries from a rail gun barrage from orbit while fighting Julieta Julis during Gjallarhorn's final siege of Tekkadan's base (but not before massacring entire platoons of Gjallarhorn's mobile suits).
Orga Itsuka (オルガ・イツカ, Oruga Itsuka)
Voiced by: Yoshimasa Hosoya (Japanese); Johnny Yong Bosch, Julie Ann Taylor (childhood) (English)
Leader of Tekkadan and former leader of CGS's Third Corp, the disposable child soldiers of the CGS. His name roughly translates to "Someday, I Will..." in Japanese. He is a soldier with great leadership skills and places great emphasis on an honorable reputation and on survival. Orga cares for his comrades, especially his friend Mikazuki. Dating back to their childhood, their brotherly bond is even stronger than that between most siblings. Angered at Third Corp being used as unwilling sacrificial decoys, Orga leads a mutiny that expels majority of the CGS's establishment. He then renames the group "Tekkadan" and promises to complete the group's original mission of escorting Kudelia Aina Bernstein to Earth. Orga struggles with the responsibility of being the de facto leader and patriarch of his surrogate "family" in Tekkadan. On the other hand, he is determined to do what is best for them and hopes to give his comrades a place to call home once their mission is complete. After the group arrives at the Teiwaz headquarters Saisei, Naze Turbine, having taken a liking to Orga, performs a Sakazuki blood oath, making the two sworn brothers. He is deeply affected by Biscuit's death until Mikazuki confronts him, prompting Orga and the rest of the Tekkadan to stand against Gjallarhorn in hopes of avenging their fallen comrades in the past and in order to protect Kudelia and Togonosuke Makanai. After Tekkadan's success, he aims to become successful as a businessman to make him and his group having a better future while protecting it from new enemies such as space pirates known as Dawn Horizon Corps. Due to his Sakazuki Blood oath with Naze, Tekkadan is affiliated with Teiwaz and becomes a formal member after drinking another Sakazuki blood oath alongside McMurdo Barriston after their first successful mission. He still refers to Naze as his "big brother" (兄貴, aniki) and now refers to McMurdo Barriston as "Pops" (親父, oyaji) (lit. "old man"). After a tense conversation with McMurdo due to Tekkadan's unilateral actions, and an inquisitive probing from Naze, he begins to reflect on whether sovereignty over Mars for his family is what he truly wants or if he's merely being reckless for the thrill of confrontation. Eventually, Orga cuts ties with Teiwaz and McMurdo when he chooses to follow McGillis' rebellion. He later dies from his wounds after protecting Ride from a drive-by shooting by Nobliss Gordon's men but not before shooting back and killing two of the assassins.
Biscuit Griffon (ビスケット・グリフォン, Bisuketto Gurifon)
Voiced by: Natsuki Hanae (Japanese); Erik Scott Kimerer (English)
The informant and strategist of CGS's Third Corp. Biscuit joined CGS to support his family, having grown up in a slum in the Dort colonies. After his parents' death in an accident, he and his sisters are taken in by their grandmother on Mars while their older brother is taken in by a company executive due to his intelligence. Biscuit is a loyal staff officer who often works with Orga. Unlike most of the members of the Third Corp, he is literate and enjoys reading. Biscuit often acts as a liaison between CGS and civilians, as he is generally more social and personable than his comrades. He dreams of being able to secure enough pay to send his sisters to school so they can improve their livelihoods. The death of his older brother, Savarin almost makes him leave Tekkadan before being reassured by Nadi. Biscuit is killed when Carta's Graze Ritter attacks both him and Orga's Mobile Worker during Gjallarhorn's raid on Millennium Island. Moments before Carta's attack, he manages to save Orga by having him thrown off from the vehicle. After the battle, his body was placed in a body bag carried onto the Montag Company's ship with his hat placed on top to identify it to the rest of Tekkadan. His hat is later taken up by Takaki in honor of his memory, and is afterwards returned to Mars. Meanwhile, his name is engraved onto a memorial stone overlooking his grandmother's farm along with the names of deceased members of Tekkadan and CGS' Third Corp.
Eugene Seven Stark (ユージン・セブンスターク, Yūjin Sebunstāku)
Voiced by: Yuichiro Umehara (Japanese); Bryce Papenbrook (English)
Former leader of CGS's Third Corp until Orga enlisted and took over the group. Because of this, Eugene and Orga are frequently at odds with each other. However, they share mutual respect and Orga often tasks him with taking command of the Isaribi in heavy combat. He initially has no interest in women, but gains a desire to experience romance after meeting the women in the Turbines harem. He later begins to view Orga as a source of inspiration, wanting to be seen as "cool" by the rest of the group. Eugene and most of the Tekkadan members in the Isaribi and the Turbines in the Hammerhead stand by in the Dort Colonies after its reformation under the protection of the Oceanian Federation. In the battle at Edmonton, he descends to Earth with the remaining crew alongside the former Human Debris from Brewers to aid Orga and the others reach to their destination. After Tekkadan's first successful mission, he is appointed Tekkadan's vice commander in charge of field operations while Orga is forced to do bureaucratic desk work. He pilots a white customized Shiden which he inherits from the late Orga. Following the fall of Tekkadan, Eugene assumes a new identity and becomes Kudelia's head bodyguard.
Akihiro Altland (昭弘・アルトランド, Akihiro Arutorando)
Voiced by: Yasuaki Takumi (Japanese); Doug Erholtz (English)
Leader of CGS' "Human Debris" (ヒューマン・デブリ, Hyūman Deburi), a term for trafficked men, usually young boys, who are enslaved and forced to work for various groups in the Outer Sphere. At a young age, Akihiro's family worked on a fleet in the merchant shipping business when space pirates boarded his family's cargo vessel and massacred all of the adults before rounding up him and his younger brother Masahiro along with the other children to be sold for labor as Human Debris. He is the second best pilot in Tekkadan, behind Mikazuki, and he received two "Whisker" man-machine interface implants, thus he was entrusted with the Graze Custom salvaged from their first battles with Gjallarhorn. Stern and cold to most around him, he often takes the lead in dangerous missions. Though he and his group are technically "freed" by Orga after Tekkadan's mutiny, the Human Debris remain with the group out of gratitude and the fact that it would be almost impossible for them to get regular jobs. He has somewhat of a friendly rivalry with Mikazuki and is often seen training with Lafter and Azee. After discovering his brother, Masahiro, enslaved by the pirate group Brewers, Akihiro tries to convince his brother to defect and show him how he can live a normal life. However, Masahiro refuses the offer and declares that Human Debris are disposable and do not deserve happiness. Masahiro then proceeds to push his brother out the way of the Gundam Gusion's attack and is killed when the Gundam Gusion's hammer smashes his Mobile Suit against an asteroid. After the battle, he asks Orga for permission to pilot the Gundam Gusion, explaining that the memories of Masahiro's death, the most concrete memories he has of his brother, are tied to the unit and that he wishes to pilot it to honor those memories. Utilizing spare parts and the original armor, the Gundam Gusion is converted to a much more versatile unit, the Gundam Gusion Rebake. In the end of the final battle in Edmonton, he survives and his Gusion Rebake is substantially damaged and pushed to its limits but remains operational.
After Tekkadan's first successful mission, he is appointed as commander of Tekkadan's Second Division. He also adopted the two surviving pilots of his brother's Human Debris squad, Aston and Derma, as his adopted brothers. After discovering Radiche's attempt to sell out the Earth branch, he goes after Galan Mossa and defeats him in combat before Galan self-destructs his Geirail. Akihiro develops a relationship with Lafter, but is distraught when she is gunned down by Jasley Donomikols' men. Mortally wounded by large metal fragments during Tekkadan's last stand (due to a rail gun barrage from orbit), he avenges her death by killing Iok Kujan, who was closely involved with Jasley and his company JPT Trust, before being killed by Iok's subordinates. Before dying, he expresses satisfaction in avenging the deaths of Turbine's deceased members.
Norba Shino (ノルバ・シノ, Noruba Shino)
Voiced by: Taishi Murata (Japanese); Lucien Dodge (English)
A large but cheerful CGS officer in the Third Corp who specializes in hand-to-hand combat and infantry tactics. During a boarding assault on one of Brewers' ships, several of his comrades are killed by the pirate group's infantry and Human Debris. Norba begins experiencing survivor's guilt, having been the assault group's commander. Eventually, he regains his composure and makes peace with himself during the funeral rites. To make up for his failures, he demands permission to pilot a Mobile Suit to gain enough power to protect his friends, just like Mikazuki and Akihiro. He is eventually given the Graze Custom 2, which he names Ryusei-Go, despite the unit's systems having difficulty being compatible with the Alaya-Vijnana System seat salvaged from one of Brewers' Man Rodi Mobile Suits. Afterwards, he begins training with Akihiro in Teiwaz's simulators. He was defeated during the battle at Edmonton, but manages to survive. Later, he was seen training new recruits in physical exercise with a very strict hand and is also in charge of Tekkadan's First Division, which received the first shipment of Shiden Mobile Suits. During encountering the mobile armor, Hashmal, he sorties out the Gundam Flauros with Yamagi manually installing the system. During Tekkadan's battle alongside McGillis against Arianrhod, Shino's arm is broken and he proposes that they use the Gundam Flauros' rail gun to target the bridge of Rustal's flagship. Unfortunately, his aim is thrown of at the last minute by Julietta's sword-whip and his Mobile Suit is completely damaged; with his cockpit pulverized by returning fire.
Takaki Uno (タカキ・ウノ)
Voiced by: Kōhei Amasaki (Japanese); Zach Aguilar (English)
A Tekkadan member who often acts as a supply courier and messenger. He admires Mikazuki and has a younger sister named Fuka Uno who resides in an orphanage while he works. Like Biscuit, he dreams of being able to secure enough pay to send his sister to school so they can improve their livelihoods. During an encounter with the Brewers, Takaki is critically injured when his Mobile Worker is crushed by a Man Rodi but has since recovered with the help of Merribit Stapleton. He is among the most deeply affected by Biscuit's death, as they shared the goal of sending their sisters to school. He is last seen piloting Orga's command Mobile Worker while wearing Biscuit's hat as a memento. After their first successful mission, he is assigned to Tekkadan's Earth Branch and has rented an apartment for himself and his sister. While cheerful and trusting of others, he's unwillingly forced to take on the role of the Earth Branch's leader by proxy with Chad's injuries and is forced to depend on outsiders such as Gallan Mossa. During the final battle in the Arbrau-SAU border war, he enters the fray as a Landman Rodi pilot. After Aston's death, he became more solemn and serious; having misplaced his trust in Radiche and Galan. He then takes matters with his own hands by requesting the others to talk to Radiche in private after the battle, before executing him for his betrayal. For the sake of his sister, Takaki decides to resign from Tekkadan and remain on Earth, but not before Orga thanks him for his work and promises him to help him find a new job. Takaki eventually lands a job as Makanai's assistant and later Alesi's following Makanai's death.
Yamagi Gilmerton (ヤマギ・ギルマトン, Yamagi Girumaton)
Voiced by: Sōma Saitō (Japanese); Griffin Burns (English)
A boy in the CGS who specializes in equipment maintenance. He appears to have a crush on Norba Shino. He also shows he's a vegetarian despite he doesn't like eating meat because of the meat's color. After the fall of Tekkadan, he is given a new identity and is last seen working in the Kassapa Mobile Worker Factory alongside former Tekkadan members.
Ride Mass (ライド・マッス, Raido Massu)
Voiced by: Mutsumi Tamura (Japanese); Amanda Miller (English)
A sharp-tongued boy within the CGS who cares for his friends. After seeing Biscuit slain by Gjallarhorn, he vows vengeance against them at any cost. He takes part in the final battle as a Mobile Worker pilot but during a suicidal charge across a bridge, his Mobile Worker is severely damaged and pushed off the bridge into the river. He survives the assault, albeit in an injured state, and decides to tell about Biscuit's death himself to his sisters when both Norba and Eugene bickering over who would do the job. He later becomes Akihiro's personal Mobile Worker pilot in the Second Division while the former directs their forces from the top of the Mobile Worker. When sent into space, he became a Shiden Mobile Suit pilot. Later on Mars, he still pilots the mobile suit to fight against the Mobile Armor, Hashmal. After his Shiden is severely damaged, he takes up Shino's Shiden Custom to draw the Mobile Armor into an ambush but is incapacitated. After accompanying Kudelia and Atra back to Admoss Company during Gjallarhorn's siege of Tekkadan's headquarters, Orga sacrifices himself to save Ride from a drive-by ambush by Nobliss Gordon's men. Years after the demise of Tekkadan and McGillis' faction, a fully grown Ride has assumed a new identity before assassinating Nobliss to avenge Orga's death.
Chad Chadan (チャド・チャダーン, Chado Chadān)
Voiced by: Haruki Ishiya (Japanese); Keith Silverstein (English)
A Tekkadan member and ex-CGS Human Debris typically found on the Isaribi's bridge. After Tekkadan's mission on Earth, he is assigned to its Earth branch to advise Arbrau's military forces and to act as its manager. After shielding Makanai from a bomb blast in Makanai's office, both he and Makanai have been knocked unconscious and injured. His unconscious body is last seen visited by Fuka while placed in a Medical Nanomachine system to heal his injuries. After returning to Mars from Earth, he begins piloting a Landman Rodi. Following the fall of Tekkadan, Chad also assumes a new identity and becomes Kudelia's second bodyguard.
Dante Mogro (ダンテ・モグロ, Dante Moguro)
Voiced by: Daiki Hamano (Japanese); Sean Chiplock (English)
A Tekkadan member and ex-CGS Human Debris who specializes in electronic warfare. He later becomes a Mobile Suit pilot in Tekkadan's First Division, albeit with noticeable inexperience in melee combat initially. After returning from the Arbrau-SAU border war, he switches to a Landman Rodi. After Tekkadan is finished, he is given a new identity and was last seen in the orphanage taking care of the children while requesting more employees from Kudelia to help out.
Nadi Yukinojo Kassapa (ナディ・雪之丞・カッサパ, Nadi Yukinojō Kassapa)
Voiced by: Atsushi Ono (Japanese); Jamieson Price (English)
A skilled CGS mechanic who is usually referred to as "Old Man" (おっさん, ossan) (lit. "uncle") by the orphans. His legs are prosthetic, and he notes that Earth-born people look down on people like him and those with Alaya-Vijnana implants due to Gjallarhorn propaganda against the technology developed during the Calamity War. As the only adult to remain with CGS, he often fills the role of a father figure, dispensing advice to the boys. Despite his somewhat gruff demeanor, he shows genuine concern for their well-being and growth. Following Tekkadan's Earth mission, Nadi forms a relationship with Merribit Stapleton. After the fall of Tekkadan, they get married and have two children while forming the Kassapa Mobile Worker Factory with some of the former Tekkadan members.
Atra Mixta (アトラ・ミクスタ, Atora Mikusuta)
Voiced by: Hisako Kanemoto (Japanese); Cassandra Lee Morris (English)
A shy grocery worker in Chryse who is childhood friends with Mikazuki. As an orphan, she worked at a brothel as a chore girl at the age of 10 under grueling and abusive conditions from the other residents there. After running away, she met Mikazuki, who offered her food and her job at Haba's Store. She holds some jealousy and envy towards Kudelia because of her growing bond with Mikazuki. When Tekkadan prepares to leave Mars and undergo their mission, Atra quits her job at the grocery store and offers her services to the group as a cook. Atra is more worldly and intelligent than she initially seems, as she is able to correctly deduce Kudelia's wishes for Mars after a simple explanation. Atra also displays a surprisingly unshakable will, willing to take a severe beating from Gjallarhorn soldiers in order to protect Kudelia. In the final battle, she escorts both Kudelia and Makanai to Edmonton by driving an armored truck despite her size with approval from Orga. After arriving at the parliament building, she looks on with support as Kudelia begins her speech. After Tekkadan's success, her quality of life becomes much better. She now has enough funding to improve the food quality such as the use of fresh meat for Tekkadan's mercenaries and she wears a brown letterman jacket with Tekkadan's emblem on the front. She is also Tekkadan's chauffeuse (She usually picks up Cookie and Cracker Griffon from boarding school and drove Mika and Hush to visit Kudelia's office for the latter to take care of their savings). Later, she confesses her feelings to Mikazuki that she really loves him. Once he reciprocates her feelings, Mikazuki and Atra start trying to conceive a child together. Kudelia later promises both Mika and Atra by saying she will protect their child. After the fall of Tekkadan and McGillis Fareed's faction, Atra gives birth to her son Akatsuki and now resides on Sakura's farm on Mars. At an official promotional event held in Shinjuku on April 9, 2017, it was revealed that Atra and Kudelia formally married to be able to take care of the son of Mikazuki and Atra together and fulfill Kudelia's promise to protect him.

Dexter Culastor (デクスター・キュラスター, Dekusutā Kyurasutā)
Voiced by: Akinori Egoshi (Japanese); Chris Cason (English)
The accounting manager of CGS. He is spared during Third Corps' mutiny and was one of the first to opt to leave. However, he was held back for the time being so that he can help issue severance pay to First Corps members who opt to leave the service and to take care of financial matters for the company. Through Dexter's calculations, Orga and his team discover that Maruba took the majority of the base's savings when he deserted during the Gjallarhorn attack, leaving Third Corps with only three months of financial support. He is left back on Mars to oversee logistics and finance there and later reports that Teiwaz's support has enabled them to not worry about financial pressures or threats from Gjallarhorn. He remains with Tekkadan and is now in charge of the bureaucratic desk work, remarking how much Orga has adapted to desk work after initially hating it so much. He was also revealed to have prepared a contingency supply and escape route should Tekkadan broke its partnership with other forces. He is last seen at the Martian Union's headquarters working under Kudelia.
Hush Middy (ハッシュ・ミディ, Hasshu Midi)
Voiced by: Ryota Osaka (Japanese); Tom Bauer (English)
A Tekkadan member from the Reserve Corps who is transferred to the Second Division on Mars. A fresh recruit eager to earn renown in combat, Hush serves as Zack Lowe's gunner in their TK-56 Tekkadan Mobile Worker. Hush grew up in the slums of Mars, eating garbage and collecting scraps with other orphans. He resents Mikazuki, who survived three Alaya-Vijnana surgeries while his childhood friend Builth committed suicide by hanging after one surgery left him paralyzed from the waist down. Consequentially, he seeks to surpass Mikazuki in memory of Builth. After Tekkadan's final battle with the Dawn Horizon Corp, he actually asked Mikazuki to seek Orga's permission for him to pilot a Mobile Suit. While Eugene vehemently disagrees, Mikazuki agrees talk to Orga after hearing Hush's goal. He is later assigned a Shiden Mobile Suit but lacks practical experience; much to his frustration. He then endeavors to become Mikazuki's student, much to the latter's annoyance. He later accompanied Mikazuki and Atra to visit Kudelia at Admoss Company and stunned at Mikazuki's improving reading ability. With Mika's entire right side paralyzed, he now takes Mika wherever the latter wishes as Mika can no longer walk. Following the demise of the Turbines, Hush is assigned the Hekija that was formerly piloted by the late Lafter Frankland. During Gjallarhorn's assault on the Tekkadan base on Mars, Hush is killed after a Graze slices through the midsection of his Hekija; piercing the cockpit and mortally wounding Hush. Before dying, he manages to kill the Graze who mortally wounded him a split second later and exchanges words of encouragement with Mikazuki.
Zack Lowe (ザック・ロウ)
Voiced by: Makoto Furukawa (Japanese); Jon Allen (English)
A new Tekkadan recruit who is transferred to the Second Division on Mars. A fresh recruit who will speak what's on his mind but lacks seriousness at drills, he serves as Hush's pilot in their TK-56 Tekkadan Mobile Worker. He later uses his savings to enjoy Chryse's nightlife with Shino. He later reveals himself as a student who went to school to study the mobile suit systems before transferring to Tekkadan. Believing that Tekkadan is hopeless, he quits the team when Orga offers him the chance. Due to Gjallarhorn surrounding the entire base, he decides to rejoin Tekkadan and help escape with them. After assuming new identities, He and Dane Uhai become members of the Kassapa Mobile Worker Factory.
Dane Uhai (デイン・ウハイ)
Voiced by: Subaru Kimura (Japanese); Edward Bosco (English)
A new Tekkadan recruit who is transferred to the Second Division on Mars. A large if gentle giant, he is good with his hands and is a maintenance worker who occasionally works with Yamagi. Prior to his membership, Dane is a former murderer who has troubles with finding jobs, feeling indebted to Orga ever since he entered Tekkadan. After escaping with the surviving Tekkadan members, Dane and Zack Lowe find employment in Nadi's new company Kassapa Mobile Worker Factory.
Aston Altland (アストン・アルトランド, Asuton Arutorando)
Voiced by: Kentarou Kumagai (Japanese); Jason C. Miller (English)
A former Human Debris liberated by Tekkadan from Brewers. Alongside Vito, Pedro, and Derma, he was one of Masahiro Altland's squad mates. With Derma and him being the squad's only survivors, they were later adopted by Akihiro as brothers with the rest of the Brewer's Human Debris (hence the surname). A skilled pilot with experience using the Alaya Vijnana System, he is assigned to Tekkadan's Earth branch and is one of the branch's top two Mobile Suit pilots. Unfortunately, he's a rather blunt individual, causing friction between him and the Arbrau troops Tekkadan were meant to advise. Despite being more grateful and content with life under Tekkadan, his mentality as a Human Debris never fully faded and he's more than willing to give up his life as it is the only thing he knows, much to Takaki's distress. He is mortally wounded blocking a blow from McGillis' Graze Ritter for Takaki. As Takaki tries to enter his Landman Rodi's cockpit after the ceasefire, he silently wishes that he never met Tekkadan and developed bonds; which he thought to be an emotional weakness. On the other hand, he also thanks Takaki for all the pleasant memories they had together before he died.
Derma Altland (デルマ・アルトランド, Deruma Arutorando)
Voiced by: Genki Muro (Japanese); Mark Allen Jr. (English)
A former Human Debris liberated by Tekkadan from Brewers. Alongside Vito, Pedro, and Aston, he was one of Masahiro Altland's squad mates. With Aston and him being the squad's only survivors, they were later adopted by Akihiro as brothers alongside the rest of the Brewer's Human Debris (hence the surname). Due to his experience, he is assigned as a Mobile Suit pilot in Tekkadan's First Division on Mars. After returning from the Arbrau-SAU border war, he switches out his Shiden for a Landman Rodi. During the conflict with Arianrhod, his Landman Rodi is damaged and he loses an arm. While other consider it fortunate that he survived, he wonders if he will still be able to fight properly or if he will become useless. Following the fall of Tekkadan, he was later seen in the orphanage with a new prosthetic arm while taking care of the children.
Radiche Riloto (ラディーチェ・リロト, Radīche Riroto)
Voiced by: Kazuyuki Fukugawa
A member of Tekkadan's Earth Branch formerly from Teiwaz, he serves as the branch's auditor and does the Branch's bureaucratic work. A rational individual, he is somewhat frustrated with Tekkadan's instinctive and somewhat irrational actions and often quarrels with them over their courses of action. One example is his frustration with Tekkadan's delay in sending Shidens to Earth due to their hostilities with the Dawn Horizon Corps. While some understand that Tekkadan has to prioritize to counter major threats, he believes that the Earth Branch needs more equipment to run efficiently, even if it is at the expense of the Main Branch on Mars. Unfortunately, his frustrations with Tekkadan's rash actions come to a head, leading him to leak information to Galan Mossa to plant a bomb that injured Makanai and Chad; making them lose consciousness. He has also privately dismissed the members of Tekkadan as mere animals who rely on their instincts and is willing to sell out on them by sending them blindly into a war they never sought. During the war, he conspires with Galan to keep McGillis' faction and Tekkadan's Main Branch from communicating to or directly entering Arbrau. Once he is exposed and arrested by the members of Tekkadan, Radiche attempts to plead for mercy by revealing Galan's escape route, but is ultimately executed by Takaki, who felt himself the most betrayed for his actions.

=== Chryse Guard Security (CGS) ===
Chryse Guard Security (クリュセ・ガード・セキュリティ, Kuryuse Gādo Sekyuriti) was a private security firm based on the outskirts of Chryse. It was disbanded and reformed into Tekkadan.

Maruba Arkay (マルバ・アーケイ, Maruba Ākei)
Voiced by: Katsuhisa Hōki (Japanese); Ian Alden (English)
The President of CGS. In his youth, he was the one who discovered the Gundam Barbatos and used it to generate power from the Gundam's Ahab Reactor (エイハブ・リアクター, Eihabu Riakutā) for CGS' base. While he was a good person when he was younger according to Nadi Kassapa, nowadays he is a vain and cowardly man who flees once CGS's base of operations is attacked by Gjallarhorn, taking most of the organization's money with him and leaving barely three months of operational funding. After discovering his battleship Isaribi is stolen, he vows revenge on Tekkadan by hiring the crew of the Teiwaz ship Hammerhead to pursue them. However, his plan is easily thwarted by Orga. Upon seeing how dishonorable and incompetent he is, Naze decides to have him stranded on a Teiwaz supply and mining satellite and have him work off his debt there for hiring the Turbines.
Todo Mirconen (トド・ミルコネン, Todo Mirukonen)
Voiced by: Yutaka Aoyama (Japanese); Kirk Thornton (English)
A high-ranking albeit physically unfit CGS officer in command of the "Human Debris". During the Third Corps' mutiny, he decides to join the youths for unknown reasons. While he gives advice to Orga and his team - albeit self-centered advice, Todo betrays Tekkadan by leaking their travel route to Earth to the Orcus Company, who then informs Gjallarhorn while double-crossing Todo. Once Tekkadan learns of his treachery, he is beaten and stripped before being jettisoned in a capsule to Gjallarhorn. He is later seen working for the Montag Company under McGillis, in disguise as the masked Montag, he still views Kudelia as nothing but also wants to visit Earth for his first time. He eventually gets his wish and is last seen becoming McGillis' chauffeur, later right-hand man in Gjallarhorn. He is later seen delivering parts to Tekkadan on Mars by McGillis, but Eugene stills loathes him due to Todo's past treachery. He currently decide to stay on Earth after bids farewell to McGillis and no longer as his right-hand man.
Haeda Gunnel (ハエダ・グンネル, Haeda Gunneru)
Voiced by: Taro Yamaguchi (Japanese); Richard Epcar (English)
Commander of CGS' First Corps. During the Third Corps' mutiny, he is shot dead by Mikazuki for his incompetence and disregard for the Third Corps during Gjallarhorn's assault on the CGS base.
Sasai Yankus (ササイ・ヤンカス, Sasai Yankasu)
Voiced by: Masashi Nogawa (Japanese); Keith Silverstein (English)
A member of the First Corps. He is gunned down by Mikazuki while defying and charging at Orga during the Third Corps' mutiny on the CGS base.
Danji Eirei (ダンジ・エイレイ)
Voiced by: Daiki Yamashita (Japanese); Griffin Burns (English)
A younger member of CGS' Third Corp. He is killed by Orlis Stenja during Gjallarhorn's assault on the CGS base when his mobile worker was crushed by his axe. His name is later added to a memorial stone overlooking Sakura's farm by Tekkadan alongside the other deceased members of CGS' 3rd Corp and Tekkadan.
Builth (ビルス, Birusu)
Voiced by:
The eldest of a group of slum boys that included a younger Hush Middy. Wanting a better life for his gang, he left the slums to join CGS, but a failed Alaya-Vijnana surgery left him paralyzed from the waist down. Shortly after being dropped back into the slums by CGS, Builth hanged himself with his own bandages due to intense depression, but not before mentioning Mikazuki's name to Hush.

=== Chryse Autonomous Region/Martian Union ===
A Martian city that has long been governed by Arbrau, one of Earth's four major powers. Its people demand independence from Earth's corrupt and arbitrary rule. While on paper it is an autonomous city, like the rest of Mars, it is actually economically dependent on Earth and so, many of its inhabitants are impoverished. After Tekkadan's demise and the McGillis Fareed incident, the colonies on Mars achieved independence and organized themselves under the Martian Union.

Kudelia Aina Bernstein (クーデリア・藍那・バーンスタイン, Kūderia Aina Bānsutain)
Voiced by: Yuka Terasaki (Japanese); Cherami Leigh (English)
A young aristocrat seeking independence from Earth for the Martian city of Chryse. More specifically, she seeks to end the cap on the prices of Mars' industrial and agricultural products such as maize, half-metals, and rare earths to enable Mars provide for its people economically. She had previously convened in a gathering, known as the "Noachis July Assembly," that ignited Mars' independence movement. Kudelia enlists the help of CGS as escorts to Earth, witnessing firsthand the reality of Mars' situation and the horrors of battle when Gjallarhorn attacks CGS's headquarters in an attempt to assassinate her. Kudelia often attempts to build a friendly, helpful rapport with the Tekkadan men, particularly Mikazuki, but is initially coldly rebuffed due to them perceiving her actions as patronizing. The group warms up to her slightly after she provides them with funding and when she offers to teach Mikazuki and the younger crew members to read and write. Due to her resolve to end the corruption in the Earth Sphere and being labelled as the "Maiden of Revolution" (革命の乙女, Kakumei no Otome), both Gjallarhorn and Nobliss Gordon treat her as a threat to their favorable status quo and would go to any lengths to have her taken out of the equation, even assassinating her maid and friend, Fumitan Admoss on Dort 3. In the final battle on Earth in Edmonton, in the middle of the road, she deals with a vengeful Ein Dalton because of his original mission, as he attacks at Kudelia due to Crank Zent's death. Orga and Atra rush to save her, however Mikazuki manage to save the three from Ein's axe. In the aftermath of the final battle, she begins negotiations with Arbrau to secure Mars' future for its people. Upon returning to Mars, Kudelia starts a mining organization known as Admoss Company with the aid of Teiwaz along with an orphanage with help from Tekkadan and Sakura Pretzel and an elementary school named in Fumitan's memory. She later attempts to help Tekkadan in their attempt to escape from Gjallarhorn, and also promises Atra that she will protect her child. After the McGillis Fareed Incident, she becomes the chairwoman of the new, independent Martian Union and signs a treaty with Rustal Elion. In an effort to prevent further conflict and suffering, she and Rustal sign a pact to eliminate the use of Human Debris. Shortly afterwards, she talks with Rustal and indirectly hints at Tekkadan being her source of motivation before leaving for Mars. She is later seen living on a farm with Atra and her son. Before having tea with the two alongside Biscuit's sisters, Kudelia silently monologues that while Mikazuki and Tekkadan are gone, she could still love the world that they sacrificed their lives for to make it a better place. At an official promotional event held in Shinjuku on April 9, 2017, it was revealed that Atra and Kudelia formally married to be able to take care of the son of Mikazuki and Atra together and fulfill Kudelia's promise to protect him.
Fumitan Admoss (フミタン・アドモス, Fumitan Adomosu)
Voiced by: Yumi Uchiyama (Japanese); Julie Ann Taylor (English)
Kudelia's loyal servant since childhood. Due to her technical skills, she offers her services to Tekkadan as a communications officer. She is later revealed to be a mole working undercover for Nobliss Gordon, feeding him information about Tekkadan's actions and whereabouts as part of a plan to frame Kudelia and Tekkadan for a union revolt at the Dort Colonies. However, she begins having second thoughts about her true loyalties after Kudelia shows her several acts of kindness and friendship. She abandons Kudelia once the truth is revealed, intending to set right her wrongs. After a massacre of rebelling union demonstrators by Gjallarhorn troops, Fumitan is shot dead while protecting Kudelia from snipers hired by Nobliss Gordon. After her mission in Arbrau, Kudelia started a half-metal mining organization with Teiwaz, "Admoss Company" and well as an elementary school, both named in Fumitan's memory.
Cookie Griffon (クッキー・グリフォン, Kukkī Gurifon) and Cracker Griffon (クラッカ・グリフォン, Kurakkā Gurifon)
Voiced by: Yūki Kuwahara (Cookie), Sayaka Senbongi (Cracker) (Japanese); Kira Buckland (Cookie), Erica Mendez (Cracker) (English)
Biscuit's nine year old twin sisters, they live with their grandmother on a cornfield which is farmed to create cheap biofuel. They are eventually accepted into a boarding school on Mars funded by Tekkadan. However, they are still affected by Biscuit's and Savarin's deaths and are afraid of losing more people they bonded with from Tekkadan; urging Mikazuki to refrain from investigating the aftermath of a bombing on the road alongside other Tekkadan members. They are last mentioned having tea with Kudelia, Atra, and Akatsuki on their farm.
Norman Bernstein (ノーマン・バーンスタイン, Nōman Bānsutain)
Voiced by: Hiroyuki Kinoshita (Japanese); Keith Silverstein (English)
Kudelia's father and the Prime Minister of Chryse. While he cares for his family, he is weak-willed as a politician when pressured by external influence, quickly selling out his daughter's location to Gjallarhorn.
Tomomi Bernstein (朋巳・バーンスタイン, Tomomi Bānsutain)
Voiced by: Misa Watanabe (Japanese); Karen Strassman (English)
Kudelia's mother. While she respects her daughter's choice of being an advocate for the people of Mars, she is still concerned about Kudelia's safety and wishes for her to return home.
Sakura Pretzel (桜・プレッツェル, Sakura Purettsueru)
Voiced by: Reiko Suzuki (Japanese); Karen Strassman (English)
Biscuit's grandmother, who owns a cornfield on the outskirts of the region. Unfortunately, the cornfield alone is not enough to cover for their expenses; as a result, Biscuit Griffon joined CGS to supplement their meager income. She is viewed by Mikazuki as an inspiration to become a farmer once he can afford to leave his job as a mobile suit pilot. She later lets Kudelia build an orphanage on her farm with help from Tekkadan.
Haba (ハバ)
Voiced by: Mariko Tōnai (Japanese); Amanda C. Miller (English)
Owner of Haba's Store, a local grocery store in Chryse. She gave Atra shelter and work after Mikazuki had found her homeless and hungry. Haba's Store often supplies food and groceries to CGS, now Tekkadan.
Fuka Uno (フウカ・ウノ)
Voiced by: Haruka Yamazaki (Japanese); Christine Marie Cabanos (English)
Takaki's bright younger sister, she used to live in an orphanage back on Mars while the latter worked in hopes of sending her to school. After Tekkadan establishes a branch on Earth, she moves in with her brother into an apartment in Edmonton after he is transferred to Earth from Mars. Currently, she remains on Earth after her brother leaves Tekkadan and start their life anew.

=== Gjallarhorn ===
Gjallarhorn (ギャラルホルン, Gyararuhorun) is a military organization that ended the Calamity War and acts as an independent peacemaker supported by Earth's four power blocs. The organization's namesake is Gjallarhorn from Norse mythology, the war horn of the gods which will be blown at the beginning of Ragnarok. During the Calamity War three centuries ago, Gjallarhorn was formed secretly by Agnika Kaieru (アグニカ・カイエル, Agunika Kaieru) and like-minded individuals from across all nations and regional power blocs to end the war and prevent humanity's extinction. To that end, they developed the Alaya-Vijnana System and the Gundam Frames to acquire the decisive edge necessary to end the conflict. Unfortunately, led by the familial groups called the Seven Stars (セブンスターズ, Sebun Sutāzu) by present time, Gjallarhorn became corrupt and now maintains peace through violent means while seeking to maintain the status quo in its favor. The organization has a presence in both the inner and outer spheres and is composed of several divisions - primarily the Terran, Martian, and Jovian branches. There are also several other divisions such as the internal affairs branch. Gjallarhorn also has an elite special forces unit known as Arianrhod, based on Luna, which is meant to react to any direct attacks against Earth. Befitting of its role as the Solar System's sole peacekeeper, it maintains a monopoly over Ahab Reactor production and possess countless mobile suits.

Having maintained the peace unopposed for years, the group slowly suffers from corruption among workers and high executives, to the point of using dirty tactics such as sabotage and secretly interfering in internal affairs of other power blocs, as pointed out by Kudelia during the Dort Colony incidents. According to both McGillis and Nadi, the Earth population's phobia towards humans with cybernetic implantation is actually due to a calculated effort by Gjallarhorn's propaganda in order to discourage the cybernetic technologies which gave Gjallarhorn the edge in winning the Calamity War from becoming popular enough to be used against Gjallarhorn itself in the future.

With the fiasco over Gjallarhorn's meddling in Kudelia's trip and Arbrau's elections exposed, multiple political entities have lost trust in the organization and have begun building up their military forces in an unprecedented arms race. Sometime later, McGillis rallied a splinter faction, placing most of the executives under his captivity while declaring war towards Gjallarhorn in hopes of reforming the organization. Although gaining Tekkadan's cooperation, the rebellion failed but many of his ideals were ironically fulfilled by Rustal himself. More specifically, Gjallarhorn regained its reputation as an effective peacemaker due to their quick response to McGillis' rebellion. Meanwhile, the loss of the Issue, Kujan, and Fareed family's heads led to the disbandment of the Seven Stars' council system in favor of a democratic system. Last but not least, Rustal scaled back Gjallarhorn's presence on Mars, leading to Earth's economic blocs withdrawing control and enabling the Martian colonies to achieve independence as the Martian Union.

McGillis Fareed (マクギリス・ファリド, Makugirisu Farido)
Voiced by: Takahiro Sakurai (Japanese); Steve Cannon, Johanna Luis (Childhood) (English)
Officially known as the son of Iznario Fareed's mistress, he was originally an orphan from the streets whose experience from being heavily abused by his adopted father and traffickers dulled his emotions and gave him a serious, highly professional demeanor. That experience shaped McGillis's ideology that only authoritative force can purge Gjallarhorn corruption by any means, even manipulating others who care for him. McGillis was first seen as a young Gjallarhorn officer who visited Mars to inspect Gjallarhorn's Martian division, encountering Mikazuki who called him "Chocolate Man" (チョコレートの人, Chokorēto no Hito) after giving Cookie and Cracker chocolates as an apology for nearly running them over. During his visit to the Dort Colonies, McGillis assumed the masked alias of "Montag" (モンターク, Montāku) to support Tekkadan with the resources of the Montag Company (モンターク商会, Montāku Shōkai) on the condition that none other than Mikazuki, Orga, and Biscuit reveals his true identity anyone else. During the Battle of Edmonton, using Ein Dalton as a means to further demonize Gjallarhorn, McGillis reveals his true intentions to his friend Gaelio Bauduin and seemingly kills him while promising to look after his sister Almaria. Once usurping his father as head of the Fareed family with his arranged marriage with Almiria ensuring he would be next in line to lead the Bauduin family, McGillis becomes the new head of the Outer Earth Orbit Regulatory Joint Fleet to restructure the fleet while smoothing foreign relations following Gjallarhorn's scandal. Nevertheless, he is still challenging the status quo and seeks more power to change Gjallarhorn. After being saved by Mikazuki from Galan Mossa's wrath, McGillis notes the youth's similarities to Agnika Kaieru. After witnessing Mika's brutal and ruthless confrontation with Hashmal, he concludes that an abrupt and groundbreaking revolution is necessary to end the corruption for good. While he begins his revolution by taking over the Gjallarhorn's headquarters in Vingolf and taking the majority of the Seven Stars hostage, he is revealed to have also had the Alaya-Vijnana System surgery in order to awaken and pilot Gundam Bael, rumored to contain Agnika Kaieru's soul. His coup d'etat ends in failure, with the remainder of his forces and Tekkadan retreating to Mars after nearly being crushed by the Arianrhod fleet. McGillis then leads a one-man assault on the fleet outside Mars' orbit, but his Gundam Bael is defeated by Gaelio's Gundam Kimaris Vidar. While roaming aboard the Arianrhod flagship to search for Rustal Elion, a critically wounded McGillis and Gaelio shoot each other with the former mortally wounded by the shot in the chest. Before dying, he having one final conversation with the latter and revealing that Gaelio made his aspirations of reforming Gjallarhorn wavered due to his friendship with Carta and Gaelio. As Gaelio wrestles with his intense, mixed feelings towards his friendship with McGillis, the latter silently dies. The war becomes known to the public as the "McGillis Fareed Incident" (マクギリス・ファリド事件, Makugirisu Farido Jiken) with many of his ideals ironically being fulfilled by Rustal.
Gaelio Bauduin (ガエリオ・ボードウィン, Gaerio Bōdowin) / Vidar (ヴィダール, Vidāru)
Voiced by: Masaya Matsukaze, Megumi Han (childhood) (Japanese); Robbie Daymond, Cristina Vee (childhood) (English)
A Gjallarhorn officer who escorts McGillis, possessing a laid-back, casual demeanor outside of battle. In the cockpit, however, he shows himself to be a highly skilled and resourceful, if not impulsive, pilot. He pilots a customized purple EB-05S Schwalbe Graze and later the ASW-G-66 Gundam Kimaris. He is McGillis's future brother-in-law through an arranged marriage with his ten year old sister. Although he respects Ein Dalton's hatred and vengeance towards Tekkadan for killing Coral, Orlis, and more specifically Crank, he reminds Ein to wait for his chance to take down Tekkadan along with Kudelia until the invasion of Dort Colonies. Like McGillis, he is more than aware of and is discontent with the flaws and deficiencies within Gjallarhorn despite his prestigious position as a member of one of the Seven Stars families. Mikazuki's nickname for him is 'Gali-Gali,' much to his outrage. He views the users of the Alaya-Vijnana System as an aberration and does not consider people with "Whiskers" as human beings anymore. On the other hand, he feels responsible for Ein as his senior officer, especially after Ein saves Gaelio twice from Tekkadan's wrath and suffers injuries as a result. Once Ein is mortally wounded and placed on life support, Gaelio is faced with a dilemma of compromising his conviction against human augmentation by having Ein survive by being augmented with the Alaya-Vijnana System or letting him die in vain. He later learns from McGillis that the stigma of those with the implant being less than human is merely Gjallarhorn propaganda to prevent people from rising up against the organization using Calamity War technology. But it was during the Battle of Edmonton that Gaelio learned McGillis has been aiding their opposition and had used him to further his goal, enraged that McGillis was willing to sacrifice Carta and others in their organization to purify Gjallarhorn. He strikes McGillis in his Grimgerde and is presumably killed after being stabbed through the Gundam Kimaris Trooper's cockpit, with McGillis named heir apparent of the Bauduin family through his arranged marriage with Almiria. In the second season, wearing a hermetically sealed helm and mask, Gaelio was revealed to survived after being saved by Rustal Elion and falsified his death record to exact revenge on his former friend and Tekkadan under the pseudonym Vidar. Having lost his disgust towards the Alaya-Vijnana System, he has been implanted with a pseudo Alaya-Vijnana on the back of his neck to interface with the Gundam Vidar in situations he can't deal with on his own. After unmasking himself to the public, he reveals his intent to kill the traitorous McGillis and Tekkadan members as well. After engaging in battle with McGillis, both their Gundams are crippled and crash into Rustal's flagship. As McGillis heads towards the bridge, he and Gaelio shoot each other with Gaelio saved by his mask. Gaelio then has one last conversation with McGillis. He cries upon hearing that McGillis' desire to seek power did waver due to his and Carta's friendship with him and due his conflicting feelings towards McGillis; ultimately bidding him farewell when he dies. He was later seen in a wheelchair with his pseudo Alaya-Vijnana implant removed and his upbeat personality returned. While talking with Julieta, they discuss Tekkadan's motivation, Gjallarhorn's subsequent fear due to not understanding them, and his regret over his inability to understand McGills until after his death. He then ask if she wants to eat with him.
Iznario Fareed (イズナリオ・ファリド, Izunario Farido)
Voiced by: Shō Hayami (Japanese); Marc Diraison (English)
McGillis' father and a high-ranking member of Gjallarhorn's leading families, the Seven Stars. He shares a professional, if not distant relationship with his adopted son. He is revealed to have arranged the marriage of his son with Almiria, supported Henri Fleurs in her election bid, and become the legal guardian of Carta Issue in order to cement his position within the power structure of the Earth Sphere. Following Tekkadan's succession in sending Makanai and Kudelia, he forcefully resigned from his position in the Seven Stars after being exposed for backing Henri. Before leaving in exile, he warns McGillis to not overestimate himself. He is later seen in his summer house in the mountains due to his exile.
Almiria Bauduin (アルミリア・ボードウィン, Arumiria Bōdowin)
Voiced by: Ai Kakuma (Japanese); Christine Marie Cabanos (English)
Gaelio's ten year old sister who is promised for an arranged marriage to McGillis once of age to strengthen ties between the Fareed and Bauduin families. She often shows insecurity about the arrangement, finding herself inferior to more mature, adult women, but McGillis always reassures her despite his own reservations about their relationship, even after Gaelio's supposed death at McGillis' hands during the Battle of Edmonton. After learning her brother is alive and angered by McGillis' actions, she attempts to kill him with a dagger. When that failed, she attempts to commit suicide, but McGillis thwarts it by reminding her of his promise to always ensure her happiness. Sometime later, Gallus comes to take Almiria back to the Bauduin Mansion. However, she refuses and decides to wait for McGillis's return to atone his sins together alongside her husband. Her fate remains unknown after McGillis is shot dead by Gaelio.
Carta Issue (カルタ・イシュー, Karuta Ishū)
Voiced by: Kikuko Inoue (Japanese); Carrie Keranen (English)
Commander of Gjallarhorn's Outer Earth Orbit Regulatory Joint Fleet, a position most see as largely ceremonial. A member of the most powerful family in the Seven Stars, she is known to be fond of dramatic flair and strict codes of conduct. She is also determined to demonstrate her fleet's capabilities to the Seven Stars without external help, but is easily outraged if things do not go according to plan. She used to be friends with McGillis and Gaelio in childhood, but now considers them to be annoying rivals at best, not hesitating to pull rank with Gaelio to keep him in line. On the other hand, she seems to have longstanding feelings for McGillis, but refuses to admit it to others and herself. She was made the ward of Iznario Fareed at some point in the past because of her father's chronic illness. Utterly disgraced by her squad's defeat at the Millennium Island, she is assigned to track down and eliminate Tekkadan while the group is on a train to Edmonton. Carta is killed after the resulting one-sided battle with the Gundam Barbatos, piloted by an enraged Mikazuki recognizing her as Biscuit's killer, despite she and her remaining troops are no match against Tekkadan's mobile suit pilots with the Alaya-Vijnana System. She is retrieved by Gaelio in the Gundam Kimaris Trooper before Mikazuki can strike a killing blow, but soon dies of her injuries regardless. In her last moments, she mistakes Gaelio for McGillis and begs for forgiveness and reassurance that she is not a disgrace while Gaelio looks on in frustration and grief.
Ein Dalton (アイン・ダルトン, Ain Daruton)
Voiced by: Yuuma Uchida (Japanese); Max Mittelman (English)
A rookie Gjallarhorn mobile suit pilot of half-Martian descent who was permitted to enlist because his father was a Terran officer. He idolized and respected Crank Zent as he was one of the few to treat him as an equal. Consequently, he wishes vengeance upon Tekkadan for their part in his death and has no qualms over killing them, despite most of the group being children, as he believes they are no longer innocent. He keeps a small pin Zent gave him before his last battle as a memento. He is eventually assigned to be the direct subordinate to Gaelio, who calls him a "boring man" because of his normally reserved and soft-spoken demeanor. Initially the pilot of a standard-issue EB-06 Graze, Ein is later given Gaelio's purple EB-05S Schwalbe Graze. Due to his Martian heritage, he faces a substantial degree of discrimination in the Earth Sphere and most of Gjallarhorn. Ein is critically injured while protecting Gaelio from a direct hit by Mikazuki within Earth's orbit and is placed on life support. McGillis suggests for Ein to have the Alaya-Vijnana System implanted into his body, much to Gaelio's disapproval. Ein eventually undergoes surgery to have his body linked to the prototype EB-AX2 Graze Ein, being reduced to merely a head and torso connected to the unit via three "Whisker" implants, much to Gaelio's distress. Empowered, if not mentally unstable, he still remembers Kudelia from his original mission. Ein's rampage in Edmonton is stopped by Mikazuki, having finally mastered the Gundam Barbatos' katana, runs him through, killing him. After his death, his brain is salvaged and installed into Gundam Vidar's Alaya-Vijnana Type E, aiding Gaelio by any combat means while negating any potential side effects on Gaelio's nervous system. His brain and the Alaya-Vijnana Type E goes overload in order to take down McGillis, after McGillis is dead, the system is shut down and his brain no longer functions.
Coral Conrad (コーラル・コンラッド, Kōraru Konraddo)
Voiced by: Hiroshi Yanaka (Japanese); Will Barret (English)
Commander of Gjallarhorn's Mars branch. Notably concerned with his reputation, he tried to stall and even bribe the investigation by McGillis and Gaelio but without success. He is killed by Mikazuki during Gjallarhorn's failed ambush of Tekkadan's transport ship within Mars' orbit while piloting a space variant EB-06 Graze.
Crank Zent (クランク・ゼント, Kuranku Zento)
Voiced by: Yasuhiro Mamiya (Japanese); Hank Ketchum (English)
A veteran Gjallarhorn mobile suit pilot. He is a highly honorable and dedicated soldier, one of the few in Gjallarhorn who does not let prejudice or pride cloud his duty or judgement. During the assault on CGS' base, Crank is shocked to discover that he and his troops are fighting against children. After being ordered to eliminate any evidence of Gjallarhorn's defeat, he defies orders and challenges the Gundam Barbatos in a duel. After losing and being mortally wounded, he is shot dead by Mikazuki upon request.
Orlis Stenja (オーリス・ステンジャ, Ōrisu Sutenja)
Voiced by: Ryuichi Kijima (Japanese); Chris Cason (English)
A commander of Gjallarhorn's mobile suit team on Mars. During Gjallarhorn's assault of CGS' base, Orlis postpones achieving their objective to hunt down several CGS Mobile Workers for sport before the mace-wielding Gundam Barbatos suddenly appears and pummels his Graze, killing him instantly. He has an older brother by the name of Corlis Stenja working on Earth who wishes to avenge him.
Corlis Stenja (コーリス・ステンジャ, Kōrisu Sutenja)
Voiced by: Ryuuichi Kijima (Japanese); Ben Lepley (English)
A Gjallarhorn commander on Earth, he is the brother of Orlis Stenja. After learning that Tekkadan arrived on Earth, he swears to avenge his brother by defeating them. However, on the final day of the Battle of Edmonton, he is defeated alongside his Mobile Suit group by Akihiro off screen.
Julieta Julis (ジュリエッタ・ジュリス, Jurieta Jurisu)
Voiced by: M.A.O (Japanese); Abby Trott (English)
A young pilot in Arianrhod, Gjallarhorn's elite division in charge of security outside of the Earth Sphere. While childish and not high ranked in Gjallarhorn, she is nevertheless a skilled pilot and is completely loyal to Rustal Elion for taking her in. In the past, she was personally trained by Galan Mossa before being recommended to Rustal for service in Arianrhod. During combat operations, she discards her childish demeanor and is completely focused on the mission. After recognizing her powerlessness in confronting the Mobile Armor, Hashmal, she volunteers to become a test pilot of a new experimental, albeit unstable Mobile Suit, known as EB-08jjc Reginlaze Julia. During the hunt for the Turbines, she expresses her disgust at Iok's underhanded tactics but declines to interfere given her focus on field-testing her new Mobile Suit. When Amida enters the fray, Julieta demonstrates her new Mobile Suit's speed and performance while dueling Amida but is unable to match the later's experience. When Amida decides to do a kamikaze run against Kujan's command ship, she chases after it. Unfortunately, Kujan orders the Dáinsleif squadron to shoot Amida under the assumption Julieta could dodge in time. With her mobile suit damaged by the rail guns, she is outraged by his recklessness. She also has knowledge of the Alaya-Vijnana System and the battle of Edmonton while being horrified that Gaelio would allow himself to be implanted with a pseudo Alaya-Vijnana system. During the war between Tekkadan/McGillis' faction and the Arianrhod fleet, she manage stop Shino's attack. However, Mikazuki critically injures her. She is later rescued by Gaelio and place under life support. After recovering from her injuries, Julieta returns to battle in order defeat the Gundam Barbatos Lupus Rex. Before leaving for the surface of Mars, she reveals her disillusionment towards Rustal's methods but understand his motives of maintaining order in the Solar System. While fighting the Gundam Barbatos, she refuses to finish him off quickly, staying on the defensive and trying to keep other Gjallarhorn Mobile Suits from being massacred. While fighting, she insists on asking why Mikazuki continues to fight, and is shocked to learn he has no solemn reason other than to stay alive. After he succumbs to his wounds, she solemnly declares the Devil of Tekkadan defeated under Rustal's command. In the aftermath of the McGillis Fareed Incident, Gaelio tells Julieta that she is rumored to be the next leader of Gjallarhorn, as she has become known as the female knight who slayed the "devil". She then quietly notes that Tekkadan's members weren't truly devils, merely human children who had no other place to go beside the battlefield; with the motivation for fighting merely trying to live on as human beings. After reminiscing on the past with Gaelio, she agrees to go eat with him but not before pushing his wheelchair abruptly upon him commenting on her being underweight.
Isurugi Camich (石動・カミーチェ, Isurugi Kamīche)
Voiced by: Tomoaki Maeno
A soft spoken subordinate of McGillis in the Outer Earth Orbit Regulatory Fleet. Thanks to his unique network, he has access to information of Outer Sphere, and he also has high skill as a mobile suit pilot. He pilots a blue EB-05S Schwalbe Graze, which is given by McGillis. On Mars, he and McGillis encounter with the mobile armor, Hashmal, he was assigned to pilot the Helmwige Reincar, an improved version of the V08-1228 Grimgerde by McGillis. He sacrifices his life by defending McGillis/Gundam Bael from Gaelio's Kimaris Vidar, ordering his superior to gather their remaining forces to join Tekkadan. In his dying breath, he expresses his gratitude to McGillis, for having allowed someone like him who had grown up in a harsh environment on a space colony to have a dream.
Iok Kujan (イオク・クジャン, Ioku Kujan)
Voiced by: Nobunaga Shimazaki (Japanese); Grant George (English)
Head of the Kujan family in the Seven Stars. The youngest member of the inner circle, he is somewhat lacking in self confidence and looks up to Rustal Elion as a mentor. He is also a high ranking officer within Arianrhod but lacks practical experience in combat. Rustal Elion privately stated that he selected Kujan as an ally for his ability to inspire loyalty in his subordinates rather than for his martial prowess. He is also rather impulsive; charging into Tekkadan's mine to apprehend McGillis to prevent him from supposedly destroying the Mobile Armor for the Order of the Seven Stars. Unfortunately, the presence of his Mobile Suit platoon awakes the Mobile Armor and he is forced to abandon them after they sacrifice themselves. He then shows signs of mental instability over his men's death; recklessly attacking the Mobile Armor in a vain attempt to avenge his honor and his men's death. After the battle, he became disillusioned with Elion after the latter refuses to accuse McGillis of underhanded motives without proof. Consequently, he seeks to make further underground connections with Jasley Donomikols; much to his advisors' dismay. After contacting Jasley, he secures Dáinsleif railguns, a banned weapon, from Arianrhod's storage facilities for Jasley to plant on one of the Turbines' transports to incriminate them. During his hunt for the Turbines, he shows signs of recklessness and arrogance; refusing to lower his command ship's bridge into the hull during combat and refusing the accept Naze's signal flares signifying surrender. Ironically, he arrogantly decides to use the banned weapon to kill Naze and Amida while they protecting their harem from harm; but not before they inflict damage on his ship's bridge. Because of this, he is briefly under house arrest in Rustal's ship to prevent further scandal. With Rustal making a deal with McMurdo to sweep the Turbines Incident under the rug, he joins Rustal in a campaign against McGillis and Tekkadan in outer space. He also engineers a false flag tactic that allows Arianrhod's Mobile Suits to utilize the Dáinsleif railguns while appearing to be the ones "fired upon first", crippling several of the opposing forces with the "retaliatory" salvo. During the final siege of Tekkadan's headquarters, he is crushed to death by Akihiro in his Graze after the latter recognizes his voice as the murderer of Naze and Amida.
Gallus Bauduin (ガルス・ボードウィン, Garusu Bōdowin)
Voiced by:
Head of the Bauduin family in the Seven Stars. The father of Almiria and Gaelio, he discovers that Gaelio is alive and is taken hostage by McGillis and his subordinates as he starts his revolution.
Nemo Baklazan (ネモ・バクラザン, Nemo Bakurazan)
Voiced by:
Head of the Baklazan family in the Seven Stars. He is seen at the Seven Stars' meetings at Vingolf and is later taken hostage during McGillis' coup.
Elek Falk (エレク・ファルク, Ereku Faruku)
Voiced by:
Head of the Falk family in the Seven Stars. He is seen at the Seven Stars' meetings at Vingolf and is later taken hostage during McGillis' coup.
Rustal Elion (ラスタル・エリオン, Rasutaru Erion)
Voiced by: Tooru Ookawa (Japanese); Ray Chase (English)
Head of the Elion family in the Seven Stars. Also the leader of Arianrhod, otherwise known as the Outer Lunar Orbit Joint Fleet, he is a confident man who is not troubled by McGillis' plans and believes in the philosophy of confronting challenge head on. While not neither power hungry nor interested in personal gain, he is extremely determined to uphold Gjallarhorn's justice in his own way and sees McGillis' plans as a threat to the world's stability. Consequentially, he is more than willing to use underhanded tactics to uphold his interpretation of Gjallarhorn's justice. It is revealed he has inside information from someone who is acquainted with McGillis' plans, later revealed to be Gaelio in disguise. After hearing of Iok's elimination of Naze and Amida, he reminds him to be more careful due to his use of the illegal Dáinsleif railguns and how McGillis is now investigating the weapons. He secretly makes a deal to hold back Iok from aiding Jasley in return for Teiwaz turning a blind eye toward the railgun incident. After arriving on Mars, he informs Orga via wireless communication that order in the Solar System and the public's acknowledgement of Gjallarhorn's role as an effective peacemaker could only be achieved by wiping out McGillis and Tekkadan. Before Julieta descends towards Mars, he learned of her disillusionment with his methods but also of her acknowledgement of the motives behind them. Impressed, he encourages her to keep her newfound moral compass while demonstrating her resolve. As Gjallarhorn's Mobile Suits withdraw, he orders the Dáinsleif teams to bombard Tekkadan's base from orbit to finish Tekkadan off. After the Arianrhod fleet defeats Tekkadan and McGillis' faction, Gjallarhorn abolishes the Seven Stars leadership and restructures its government as a democratic system with Rustal as its first leader. His new policies, which involve reducing Gjallarhorn's presence on Mars and democratizing Gjallarhorn, ironically reflect many of McGillis' ideals. He later signs the Human Debris Abolishment Treaty with Kudelia and is impressed at her convictions after she indirectly hints at Tekkadan being her source of motivation.
Yamazin Talker (ヤマジン・トーカ, Yamajin Tōka)
Voiced by: Hitomi Nabatame (Japanese); Karen Strassman (English)
Arianrhod's female chief maintenance officer. She is heavily trusted by Rustal and is also in charge of Arianrhod's many secret Mobile Suit projects, including the Alaya-Vijnana System. She was later seen putting the Gundam Bael back in storage.
Liza Enza (ライザ・エンザ, Raiza Enza)
Voiced by: Kengo Takanashi
One of the young officers under McGillis during the coup d'etat who grieved over the corrupt state of Gjallarhorn. Unfortunately, he and his crew are killed by Arianrhod's railguns after being "fired upon first."

=== Teiwaz ===
Named after the Germanic Tiwaz rune, it is a business conglomerate that operates around Jupiter. It is rumored to be run like a mafia organization and has sufficient influence to smuggle anything to Earth without Gjallarhorn's direct interference, for a price. The group possess a number of mobile suits. Culturally, Teiwaz seems to be primarily Italian, but they practice several distinctly Japanese-styled customs, such as the Sakazuki blood oath, which involves two leaders of different factions sharing sake, symbolically binding them as "family." Due to Orga Itsuka's Sakazuki blood oath with Naze Turbine, Tekkadan is affiliated with Teiwaz and becomes a formal member after drinking another Sakazuki blood oath with McMurdo Barriston after their first successful mission. After the Turbines' dissolution, Tekkadan renounce their affiliation with McMurdo removed JPT Trust from its branch when its leader plot to overthrow his position.

McMurdo Barriston (マクマード・バリストン, Makumādo Barisuton)
Voiced by: Unshō Ishizuka (Japanese); George C. Cole (English)
The true leader of Teiwaz, residing on the Teiwaz main base Saisei in Jupiter's orbit. While stated to be a fearsome man, he comes across as warm and good humored when introduced to Tekkadan by Naze Turbine. One example of this is when he decides to have his mechanics repair and upgrade the Gundam Barbatos due to taking a liking to Mikazuki and his personality. He is also quite perceptive, as he is able to understand the potential impact of Kudelia's mission on the Solar System's future and agrees to support her mission in exchange for mineral rights to Mars' half-metals. However, it turns out that he and Nobliss are now in league with each other for unknown reasons. More specifically, he proposed an alliance between them after the massacre at the Dort Colonies. On the other hand, he advises that Nobliss shouldn't kill off Kudelia so quickly. Upon hearing Orga's suspicion of McMurdo turning a blind eye to the shipment of weapons under Tekkadan (which they transported with no knowledge of the contents), Naze explains that McMurdo is fond of hedging bets as a strategy and that it isn't considered a betrayal against Tekkadan. After Tekkadan finishes their mission, it is revealed that the fiasco involving Gjallarhorn has begun an arms race among all political factions in the Solar System given Gjallarhorn's lack of credibility. With this in motion, mercenary groups such as the Teiwaz-affiliated Tekkadan are being seen as a viable source of experienced manpower while Teiwaz is in position to profit from the new war economy. After Tekkadan's mission to Edmonton, he exchanges a Sakazuki blood oath with Orga, formally initiating Tekkadan as a full member of Teiwaz. Those who have exchanged a Sakazuki blood oath with him and are directly under his command affectionately refer to him as "Pops" (親父, oyaji) (lit. "old man"). With discontent rising within Teiwaz over Tekkadan's quick growth in influence for a young affiliate, he has reservations over the friction caused but also sees opportunities for profit. During a tense meeting with Orga, he listens to Orga describe the events regarding the Mobile Armor before being offered Orga's Sakazuki cup. Afterwards he is told by Orga of how he was aware of tensions in Teiwaz and that McMurdo can break the cup and severe ties with Tekkadan if he believes them to be a hindrance. While he reprimands Orga for essentially becoming Gjallarhorn's dog, he informs Orga that the investments into Mars are too much for Teiwaz to decline. On the other hand, he warns Orga that if he betrays Teiwaz, the Sakazuki cup and his oath would not be the only things that would be broken at Tekkadan's expense. After Naze's death, he holds a private funeral in memory of him and later is revealed to have made a bargain with Rustal. In exchange for having Iok not back Jasley's mercenaries against Tekkadan, he would turn a blind eye towards the Turbines incident. He notes that while Tekkadan was too rash to stay in Teiwaz as a reliable affiliate, their passionate quest for vengeance for the Turbines was admirable. He later privately lets Azee and the Turbine survivors smuggle the survivors of Tekkadan to Earth to get new identities. He is last seen with Eco Turbine and Azee Gurumin on Saisei playing chess and is mentioned to have been a key player alongside Rustal in letting the Martian Union take shape.
Merribit Stapleton (メリビット・ステープルトン, Meribitto Sutēpuruton)
Voiced by: Rie Tanaka (Japanese); Johanna Luis (English)
A civilian who encounters Orga and Mikazuki aboard Saisei. Seeing that Orga cannot handle his alcohol intake, Merribit gives him her handkerchief. Merribit is later introduced as Teiwaz's liaison assigned to oversee activities aboard the Isaribi. She is also adept at field medicine and noted that it was foolish for Tekkadan to begin their journey without a medical expert. She often subtly chastises Orga over his lack of practical experience at leading Tekkadan, much to his discomfort. Merribit is horrified with Tekkadan's universal acceptance of blind vengeance after Biscuit's death and desperately tries to steer the boys away from that path, but is ignored and chastised for getting in the way. On the other hand, they explain that if they do not pursue vengeance, then their guilt would haunt them forever. Nevertheless, she is very distraught over her inability to prevent them from risking their lives recklessly. In the end, she realizes what Tekkadan is truly capable of and is relieved that they are able to "return to being children" even after fighting for so long. She was later seen on Mars in charge of Tekkadan's accounting work and is dating Nadi Yukinojo Kassapa. After Turbines' dissolution, Merribit quits the group and watches the battle between Tekkadan/McGillis and the Arianrhod fleet from Kudelia's office. Following the fall of Tekkadan and McGillis, she marries Nadi and has two children with him.
Jasley Donomikols (ジャスレイ・ドノミコルス, Jasurei Donomikorusu)
Voiced by: Ryouta Takeuchi (Japanese); D.C. Douglas (English)
A Teiwaz executive director and JPT Trust (JPTトラスト, JPT Torasuto) representative and effectively the second highest ranking member of Teiwaz. While discontent with what he views as McMurdo's patronizing of Tekkadan once they become full members, he believes that he should let the "underlings" do the petty work such as eliminating the pirates rather than getting his own hands dirty. After Tekkadan is rewarded with their own half-metal mine by McMurdo for defeating the Dawn Horizon Corps and securing Teiwaz's trade routes, he voices his objections to giving such a valuable source of revenue to a relatively new organization under Teiwaz's umbrella. After Tekkadan is secretly promised control over Mars by McGillis, he is at the forefront of the opposition to Tekkadan's rapid growth in power at a meeting in Teiwaz. He also does not think highly of the Turbines as he disapproves of Naze having his wives as Mobile Suit pilots while personally dismissing Naze as a playboy. He has secretly considered McMurdo Barriston to have gone senile and has decided to use his JPT Trust's connections to the Seven Star's Kujan family to leak information to them. After Iok Kujan contacts him, he uses his influence to plant Dáinsleif railguns, a banned weapon, on one of the Turbines' transports to incriminate them. With the Turbines out of the way, and with Iok's support, Jasley decides to provoke Tekkadan by having his men assassinate Lafter and provoking them into a fight. In addition, he intends to permanently dispose of McMurdo from the position of Teiwaz's head and takes it away from the old man. When JPT Trust is attacked by Tekkadan, Jasley attempts to get help from McMurdo, only to learn that he is on his own after McMurdo notifies him that he was made aware of Jasley's plans to have him arrested by Gjallarhorn and that he made a deal with Rustal to sweep the Turbines incident under the rug in exchange for keeping Iok's forces demobilized. Left with no options, Jasley contacts the Isaribi for a conditional ceasefire, but Orga refuses his request before Mikazuki uses the Gundam Barbatos Lupus Rex to crush the bridge of Jasley's ship, killing him for good.

=== Turbines ===
A branch of Teiwaz that is responsible for its parent organization's shipping and transportation duties, it was founded by maverick smuggler Naze Turbine and female mercenary Amida Arca. Founded to provide protection and secure work for runaway women who were forced to take cheap and suicidal jobs as long range transporters at the mercies of raiders, the organization eventually became a member of Teiwaz after Naze drank a sakazuki blood oath to McMurdo Barriston. Socially, Naze took in any exploited women he encountered as his nominal wives while providing them with steady work as crew members on his ship. The organization grew to have 50,000 members and stretched from Jupiter all the way to Mars. They later become a senior sibling affiliate with Tekkadan, vouching for them at Teiwaz's gatherings. Unfortunately, due to animosity from Jasley Donomikols and Iok Kujan towards both the Turbines and Tekkadan respectively, the Turbines are framed for smuggling Dáinsleif railguns, a weapon that is banned by Gjallarhorn, to Tekkadan. With Teiwaz forced to disown the Turbines in all but name and with Tekkadan unable to help without being implicated, the Turbines are forced to strike out on their own as an underground organization. As the Arianrod fleet closes in on the Turbines, Naze announces the organization's disbandment and asks McMurdo to protect its women. While the Turbines were starting evacuation at their main base, Arianrhod's fleet arrives under Iok's command. Ignoring all signals for a ceasefire and surrender, he proceeds to have his forces target both the combatants and the civilians fleeing the scene. The main transports carrying the civilians were crippled before exploding, but the majority of the civilians survived and managed to evacuate on shuttle craft escorted by the Turbine's mobile suits and Tekkadan (who were on a convenient "training exercise").

Naze Turbine (名瀬・タービン, Nase Tābin)
Voiced by: Kōsuke Toriumi (Japanese); David Vincent (English)
Captain of the Hammerhead. He leads the Turbines, which manages Teiwaz's transport branch. Naze's harem of wives makes up the entire crew complement of the Hammerhead. He has also fathered several children with the women in his harem. On the other hand, the majority of his wives are nominal only and he only fathers children with those who actively seek his companionship. Originally a maverick smuggler, he formed a partnership with Amida Arca on Mars during her mercenary days. They then formed the Turbines to protect the exploited women who were forced to work as long distance freighters on cheap and suicidal assignments; culminating with the Turbines becoming a member of Teiwaz. After encountering Orga and seeing his determination to protect his brothers-in-arms, Naze quickly takes a liking to Orga and Tekkadan as a whole and performs a Sakazuki blood oath with Orga, making them, in Teiwaz's eyes, sworn brothers. As such, he typically refers to Orga as just "brother" (兄弟, kyōdai). In the end, he descends to Earth to check and see if everything is all right. After the Dawn Horizon Corps is defeated, he witnesses McMurdo's decision to reward Tekkadan their own half-metal mine and Donomikols' objections. After the affair he silently notes that Orga's not good at playing politics and will keep making more enemies if this keeps up. He then appears on Mars with Amida while Tekkadan survey's the new mine before the latter encountered the Gundam Fauros' wreckage. After Tekkadan is secretly promised control of Mars, he is forced to swear on his life that he would keep Orga in check. He later informs Orga that this is the last time he can tolerate any unilateral actions as he can't be disloyal to McMurdo Barriston. After the battle regarding Hashmal, he informs Orga that he is a prospective candidate to be promoted to underboss at Saisei; likely in order to keep Orga from crossing any lines set by Teiwaz. Later, with the Turbines framed of smuggling illegal Dáinsleif railguns to Tekkadan, he is forced to take the Turbines underground and seek his enemies with no support. Naze is killed in action while helping the Turbines evacuate their base when he rams his ship Hammerhead against two battleships after the Arianrod fleet's Dáinsleif squadron critically damage it.
Amida Arca (アミダ・アルカ, Amida Aruka)
Voiced by: Atsuko Tanaka (Japanese); Wendee Lee (English)
One of Naze's wives, seemingly the closest to him, acting as his right hand. She was originally a mercenary who took up escort jobs as a Spinner Rodi pilot. In her spare time, she provided protection to the female transporters who were forced to take cheap and suicidal assignments. After partnering up with Naze, they founded the Turbines. Within the Hammerhead's crew, she acts as a maternal figure for the other younger women on the ship. She is also very benevolent, giving advice regarding family relationships to Atra and the other girls. She pilots a customized pink Hyakuren. After trying to rush Kujan's commandship, Amida is killed in action by the Dáinsleif squadron, but with her final breath, she fires a shot that nearly destroys the bridge of Iok Kujan's ship.
Lafter Frankland (ラフタ・フランクランド, Rafuta Frankurando)
Voiced by: Yōko Hikasa (Japanese); Cristina Vee (English)
A Teiwaz pilot, she typically uses the mobile suit Hyakuri in battle, but is given Amida's custom Hyakuren, converted into the disguised Rouei, to accompany Tekkadan on their descent to Earth. She is shown to normally have a carefree, playful demeanor, but becomes ruthless in the cockpit. She often trains with Akihiro and Mikazuki in mock battles. While secretly tasked with aiding Tekkadan on Earth under Naze's order, she compares her role alongside Azee with that of an elder sister ensuring that her colleagues don't get into too much trouble. She is defeated by the Graze Ein during the battle at Edmonton, but survives. She later on becomes an instructor for new Tekkadan members in Mobile Suit combat, engaging in mock combat in Shiden Mobile Suits and soon developing feelings for Akihiro. After returning to the Turbines, she switches her Shiden for a Hekija Mobile Suit. Following the deaths of Naze and Amida, Lafter is among the surviving Turbines taken under McMurdo's protection, but while shopping for a gift for Akihiro, she is assassinated in a drive by shooting by one of Jasley's subordinates to provoke Tekkadan.
Azee Gurumin (アジー・グルミン, Ajī Gurumin)
Voiced by: Sachi Kokuryu (Japanese); Erica Lindbeck (English)
A Teiwaz Hyakuren pilot, her unit is also converted into the disguised Rouei. She has a calm, collected demeanor. She joins Lafter in accompanying Tekkadan to Earth's surface on Naze's orders. Azee is defeated by the Graze Ein during the battle at Edmonton, but survives. She later goes on to train new Tekkadan members in Mobile Suit combat, coaching them and scolding their mistakes from the sidelines. After returning to the Turbines, she also switches her Shiden for a Hekija Mobile Suit. After the deaths of Naze, Amida, Lafter, and the downfall of Jasley, she is now taken over Naze's place. She helps smuggle Tekkadan's survivors to Earth to get new identities and is last seen on Saisei with Eco Turbine and McMurdo Barriston.
Eco Turbine (エーコ・タービン, Eco Tābin)
Voiced by: Yurika Kubo (Japanese); Kira Buckland (English)
A Teiwaz mechanic, she is often seen working on the Turbines' Mobile Suits. She later descends to Earth with Lafter and Azee to help maintain their Mobile Suits alongside those from Tekkadan. After the Battle of Edmonton, she is stationed on Mars with Laftar and Azee to help Tekkadan with their new shipment of Shiden Mobile Suits. After the McGillis Fareed Incident, she is seen with Azee and McMurdo at their home base.
Bilt Turbine (ビルト・タービン, Biruto Tābin)
Voiced by: Yuna Yoshino
A member of the Turbines, she is often seen piloting the Turbine's armored assault ship, the Hammerhead, at the bridge. During the attack on the Turbines, she is dismissed from her post by Naze and evacuated alongside the rest of the civilians. She is last seen piloting a freighter with Eco Turbine while Azee watches on from the captain's chair.

=== Brewers ===
A group of space pirates who operate between Earth and Mars, doing raids on cargo ships and abducting innocent children into Human Debris to be sold for labor or forcefully work for them as disposable mobile suit pilots. Like CGS, they are not above forcing their Human Debris pilots to undergo surgery for "Whisker" man-machine interface implants despite the operation's high failure rate. The group's treatment of the children is harsh, with physical and emotional abuse being commonplace. They are hired by Gjallarhorn to abduct one of the members of Tekkadan in exchange for Kudelia. They possess multiple Man Rodi mobile suits alongside the Gundam Gusion, two assault ships, and two cargo vessels. After their defeat by Tekkadan and the Turbines, their assets are reduced to one assault ship while their second vessel, the surviving Human Debris, and the remaining mobile suits are claimed by Tekkadan. The second vessel was later sacrificed as an unmanned decoy to slip through a blockade around Earth. The surviving Human Debris later join in the final battle under Tekkadan's command on Earth.

Kudal Cadel (クダル・カデル, Kudaru Kaderu)
Voiced by: Yoshinori Fujita (Japanese); Tom Fahn (English)
A Brewer who pilots the Gundam Gusion. He is notably the ugliest blood-thirsty brute in the group and beats up Brewers' Human Debris pilots if they fail. He also abuses them emotionally and threatens them with death in they fail consistently. He is killed when Mikazuki impales the Gusion's cockpit through its neck joint but not before accusing him of enjoying the slaughter of fellow men, an accusation that secretly disturbs the latter. Despite his death, the Gundam Gusion is salvageable and is claimed by Tekkadan.
Masahiro Altland (昌弘・アルトランド, Masahiro Arutorando)
Voiced by: Seiichirō Yamashita, Lynn (childhood) (Japanese); Chris Hackney, Wendee Lee (childhood) (English)
Akihiro's younger brother. After both brothers were separated from each other by space pirates, Masahiro becomes a Human Debris mobile suit pilot for Brewers. He is assigned to a squad of Human Debris composed of Aston, Delma, Vito, and Pedro. While he remembers Akihiro's promise to find him, years of abuse have created a massive sense of pessimism and melancholy that eventually develops into insanity after Akihiro meets him a second time. When Akihiro urges him to defect and attempts to tell him there is still hope for them to have a brighter future, Masahiro snaps and believes that his brother had forsaken him when he learns that Akihiro found a new family in Tekkadan and had initially given up on him for a long time. He proceeds to lecture Akihiro on the fate of all Human Debris. Masahiro is killed when he pushes Akihiro's Graze Custom out of the way of a hammer strike from the Gundam Gusion, his Man Rodi being crushed against a chunk of space debris with the Gusion's strike. Before dying, he has one final face-to-face talk with his brother.
Brooke Kabayan (ブルック・カバヤン, Burukku Kabayan)
Voiced by: Taketora (Japanese); Michael McConnohie (English)
Leader of the Brewers. He is notably arrogant and confident in Brewers' ability to take on Tekkadan and the Turbines at once. After the Brewers downfall, his fate is currently unknown.

=== Arbrau ===
One of the four economic and political power blocs on Earth alongside the African Union, the Strategic Alliance Union, and the Oceanian Federation, its territory consists of all non-European territories in the Arctic Circle. It is also the first of the power blocs to give its Martian colonies partial autonomy. Following Tekkadan's succession in sending Makanai and Kudelia to the parliament, Arbrau hires Tekkadan's mercenaries as military advisors.

Togonosuke Makanai (蒔苗 東護ノ介, Makanai Tougonosuke)
Voiced by: Mugihito (Japanese); Sam Mann (English)
The former Prime Minister of Arbrau, he was ousted and forced to exile on an island within the Oceanian Federation. After Makanai meets up with Kudelia upon her arrival on Earth, he requests for Tekkadan to escort him to a plenary session of parliament in hopes for his re-election. Arriving at the parliament, he gives Kudelia the opportunity to deliver her speech, allowing her to take the first steps towards her lifelong dream to liberate Mars. On the eve of the inauguration of the Arbrau Defense Force, he and Chad were injured and rendered unconscious due to a bomb blast in his office. After recovering from the attack, he begins pondering his mortality and asks if Kudelia would be willing to become his successor. Following the demise of Tekkadan and McGillis' faction, Makanai passes away, and a hall in Arbrau is named after him. He is succeeded by Alesi as Arbrau's Prime Minister.
Henri Fleurs (アンリ・フリュウ, Anri Furyuu)
Voiced by: Yōko Sōmi (Japanese); Wendee Lee (English)
A member of the Arbrau Parliament who plans to run for Prime Minister. She is in league with Iznario Fareed, McGillis's father. She becomes frustrated when Togonosuke Makanai manages to leave the Millennium Island escorted by Tekkadan, making her plans much more difficult. She loses the election and is last seen removing her wig in anger.
Lasker Alesi (ラスカー・アレジ, Rasukā Areshi)
Voiced by: Nobuo Tobita (Japanese); Keith Silverstein (English)
A member of the Arbrau Parliament and a strong supporter of Makanai. Following Makanai's death, Alesi succeeds him as Arbrau's Prime Minister.

=== Admoss Company ===
Admoss Company (アドモス商会, Adomosu Shōkai) is a Mars-based organization formed by Kudelia and Teiwaz to mine, process, and ship the half-metal of Arbrau colonies. The company is named after Kudelia's late friend Fumitan Admoss.

Cucubita Hougue (ククビータ・ウーグ, Kukubīta Ūgu)
Voiced by: Kimiko Saitō
Kudelia's assistant in Admoss Company. An outspoken woman, she is last seen working at the Martian Union's headquarters under Kudelia.

=== Terra Liberionis ===
Terra Liberionis (テラ・リベリオニス, Tera Riberionisu) is a Mars-based political organization struggling to keep afloat. After Allium Gyojan's death, the rest of the organization was arrested by Gjallarhorn.

Allium Gyojan (アリウム・ギョウジャン, Ariumu Gyōjan)
Voiced by: Kan Tanaka
President of Terra Liberionis, he was the one who asked Kudelia to speak at the July Noachis Assembly, sparking the Mars independence movement. He offers his services to the Admoss Company in hopes that Kudelia's fame will help his company financially, but after Kudelia rejects his offer, he hires the Dawn Horizon Corps to attack the Admoss mines in retaliation. After Tekkadan returns to Mars, Gyojan tries to feign innocence but is gunned down by Mikazuki in retaliation for crossing them and being unable to pay the repatriation fee.

=== Dawn Horizon Corps ===
The Dawn Horizon Corps (夜明けの地平線団, Yoake no Chiheisen-dan) is a pirate faction known for assaulting merchant vessels on routes between Earth and Mars. The organization has over 2,500 members and 10 armored assault ships. The Dawn Horizon Corps are powerful enough that even Teiwaz has difficulty dealing with them. They are also strong enough to raid as far as the borders of the Earth Sphere and have managed to evade Gjallarhorn's fleets for quite some time. Like Brewers, they are known to use Human Debris mobile suit pilots as cannon fodder before sending in their elite forces. After their encounter with Tekkadan and the Outer Earth Orbit Regulatory Joint Fleet, their leader is arrested while the rest of the fleet is forced to surrender to Arianrhod.

Sandoval Reuters (サンドバル・ロイター, Sandobaru Roitā)
Voiced by: Taiten Kusunoki
Leader of the Dawn Horizon Corps. He is committed to restoring the group's personal pride and honor after their assault on the Admoss Company's mine is driven off by Tekkadan and has sworn to defeat them if given the chance. With his fleet and Mobile Suit numbers battered by Tekkadan, Isurugi, and later Arianrhod, he proceeds to take on them head on by piloting a Hugo Mobile Suit. He is captured by Mikazuki and later turned in to Isurugi's custody, his fate remains unknown.

=== Others ===
Nobliss Gordon (ノブリス・ゴルドン, Noburisu Gorudon)
Voiced by: Katsumi Chō (Japanese); Ian Alden (English)
The leader of GN Trading, he is a wealthy man who is one of Kudelia's sponsors in her independence movement. He, through Kudelia, provides Tekkadan with the operational funding to undertake the escort mission to Earth. He is revealed to have framed Tekkadan and Kudelia for arming and starting a workers' uprising on the Dort colonies and making sure she is killed there since her cause would up-heave the status quo in the Earth Sphere. He also makes a deal with McMurdo Barriston, but the Teiwaz's leader advises him not to have Kudelia killed, much to his confusion. After Tekkadan finishes their mission, he is last seen discussing the Solar System's geopolitical future with McMurdo Barriston. He also knows about the organization Terra Liberionis and their leader Allium Gyojan but has chosen to ignore them as they are no longer useful. He later makes a deal to give Kudelia's Admoss Company more funds but is also invested in the arms race caused by Gjallarhorn's scandal; much to her displeasure. When Tekkadan was branded as wanted figures by Gjallarhorn, Nobliss took advantage of the incident by sending his men to kill several Tekkadan members at the Admoss Company's office, although only managed to kill Orga from the surprise attack. He was also tasked with taking care of any incidents on Gjallarhorn's behalf, as well as manipulating the media to believe Tekkadan refused to surrender. Several years later, Nobliss and the whole of GN Trading are assassinated by Ride and a small group of ex-Tekkadan Human Debris for their participation in eliminating Tekkadan.
Orcus (オルクス, Orukusu)
Voiced by: Kenji Nomura (Japanese); Richard Epcar (English)
President of the Orcus Company, which is in charge of the transport routes between Mars and Earth. Though he makes a deal with Tekkadan on securing a safe passage for them to escort Kudelia to Earth, he double-crosses them by notifying Gjallarhorn of the route and seeking to destroy their transit shuttle with his own armored assault ship in exchange for favors from Coral Conrad.
Savarin Canule (サヴァラン・カヌーレ, Savaran Kanūre)
Voiced by: Daisuke Hirakawa (Japanese); Chris Niosi (English)
Biscuit's elder brother who works for the Dort Company (ドルトカンパニー, Doruto Kanpanī), an African Union corporation charged with managing the Dort Colonies near Earth. Unlike his siblings, who were sent to their grandmother on Mars, he was taken in by a company executive due to his intelligence. Unfortunately he believes that Tekkadan is a dangerous insurgent group due to misinformation intentionally given by the authorities to the company's employees in order to frame Tekkadan and Kudelia. Nevertheless, he still remembers his bonds with his friends and family in the Dort Colony's workers and even acts as their intermediary to the management. However, given the pressure and heavy-handed tactics used by Gjallarhorn along with the lack of time to pursue other options, he's desperate to stop the uprising before it happens and believes handing Kudelia over to them is the easiest and quickest way out. Unfortunately, the demonstration becomes a massacre and he is last seen crying over Navona's body while apologizing to him. After the massacre, Savarin leaves a message to Biscuit telling him not to repeat his mistake by being overburdened with responsibility. After writing the message, he then commits suicide by hanging out of guilt for his former comrades' deaths.
Navona Mingo (ナボナ・ミンゴ, Nabona Mingo)
Voiced by: Mitsuru Ogata (Japanese); Doug Stone (English)
Leader of the workers' union in the Dort 2 colony. While he is more patient than other members of the workers' union and wishes to wait for Savarin to come up with a solution to the workers' situation, he is forced to take action once Gjallarhorn launches an unsuccessful raid against the unions' armory. Navona stages a demonstration against the Dort Company, but it becomes deadly when Gjallarhorn forces open fire under the cover of smoke and a staged bombing on Dort headquarters, killing Navona and nearly everyone involved. On the other hand, after their plight is publicized by Kudelia's broadcast, the union is able to obtain the reforms they sought, but at the cost of many lives before her intervention.
Galan Mossa (ガラン・モッサ, Garan Mossa)
Voiced by: Kenta Miyake (Japanese); Lex Lang (English)
A mercenary, highly skilled tactician, and personal friend of Rustal Elion, he gave up his family, true name, and original affiliations to become the latter's underground associate. In the past, he personally trained Julieta Julis and recommended her for Arianrhod to Rustal Elion. He is secretly hired by Rustal to cause a war between Arbrau and the SAU by taking Makanai Togonosuke and Chad, Tekkadan's leader on Earth, out of action and causing panic at the Arbrau Defense Force's inauguration. It is hoped that by showing McGillis' inability to end the war between Arbrau and the SAU quickly, his credentials would be severely diminished. After the bombing, he is placed in charge of Arbrau and Tekkadan's forces with his own force of Mobile Suits. He is a skilled tactician as he managed to drag out the war for weeks by withdrawing the forces under his command whenever the advantage swung to their side. In addition, he is skilled at reading his associates' psychology and is skilled enough at acting to feign concern to gain their trust. Like Radiche, he privately dismisses Tekkadan's members as animals but be-musingly notes that they could be tamed with food and pats on the back of the head. Using this strategy, he manipulated the war into forcing Tekkadan's Earth Branch into none-stop skirmishing; dulling their wits and instincts while forcing them to rely on him for strategizing. In combat, he pilots a Geirail Mobile Suit. After Mikazuki and the others from Mars intervene, he and his mercenaries withdraw from the battlefield and try to reach the African Union. Unfortunately, they are sold out by Radiche and defeated; with Galan defeated by an enraged Akihiro. On the verge of being crushed inside the cockpit, he activates his unit's self destruct before silently apologizing to Rustal.
Akatsuki Augus (暁・オーガス Akatsuki Ōgasu))
Voiced by: Ayaka Asai
Mikazuki and Atra's son. Mikazuki never had the chance to see his son's birth due to his death. Akatsuki inherits his father looks and hair color from his mother.

== Mecha and vehicles ==
=== Gundam-Frame Suits ===
"Gundam" is the name for 72 unique mobile suit frames produced and developed alongside the Alaya-Vijnana System by Gjallarhorn during the late stages of the Calamity War 300 years ago, considered instrumental in ending the war. A Gundam-Frame unit is equipped with two Ahab Reactors, which generate Ahab Particles, giving the mobile suit unparalleled power, but it is difficult to keep the reactors in synchronous operation; hence the rarity of these machines. A Gundam's high power and maneuverability can also pose a problem by creating a heavy burden for the pilot. However, this is mitigated by the implementation of Inertial Control from the use of the Ahab Reactors and the cockpit is positioned in front of the reactors to take advantage of this. Only 26 of the 72 Gundam-Frame suits are confirmed to exist in operational form in the present day. All Gundam Frames were named after the 72 Demons of Ars Goetia.

ASW-G-01 Gundam Bael (ガンダム・バエル, Gandamu Baeru)
The first Gundam Frame produced and used in the Calamity War, the white and blue Gundam Bael specializes in all purpose and aerial combat. Created by the founder of Gjallarhorn, Agnika Kaieru, it was the most powerful symbol of the organization as well as the first ever Gundam Frame equipped with an Alaya-Vijnana System. It is capable of flight due to its wings and thrusters, and exhibits superior mobility and fighting strength than its successor frames. It is only armed with two golden-bladed swords, both capable of cutting down mobile suits and two electromagnetic cannons installed in its thruster wings for ranged combat. As it symbolizes the power of Agnika Kaieru and Gjallarhorn as a whole, it is believed his soul resides inside the Alaya-Vijnana System. When he died, it was put in storage inside the Gjallarhorn headquarters, only to be awaken by McGillis after announcing his rebellion against the Arianrhod Fleet and the people who stood against him. After McGillis' death, it was damaged and returned in storage back in the headquarters with its joints restrained and with its cockpit removed.
ASW-G-04 Gundam Gamigin (ガンダム・ガミジン, Gandamu Gamijin)
Appearing in Mobile Suit Gundam Iron-Blooded Orphans MSV and in Iron Blooded Orphans Urdr Hunt. One of the first Gundam frames to be produced and used in the calamity war. The Gundam Gamigin belongs to one of the seven stars families, the falk family, and was piloted by Kalf Falk. Currently this Gundam Frame is kept under watch by the Falk family. It is equipped with a 110mm Minigun, and a revolver-axe.
ASW-G-08 Gundam Barbatos (ガンダム・バルバトス, Gandamu Barubatosu)
A relic of the Calamity War, the Gundam Barbatos is an initially incomplete mobile suit used as a power source for CGS' headquarters in Chryse. Discovered years before by CGS' leader, it lacked a cockpit and its still functioning dual Ahab Reactors were used to generate power before the battle with Gjallarhorn forced the Third Corp to hastily install a Mobile Worker cockpit. Due to overall neglect over the years, its armor and performance have degraded, leaving much of the inner frame exposed. Tekkadan continually outfits and repairs it with armor and weaponry salvaged from defeated mobile suits, such as shoulder armor from a captured Graze or an arm-mounted wire claw stolen from Gaelio Bauduin's Schwalbe Graze, to make up for the unit's shortcomings. The unit, having been further damaged in a battle with the Turbines, is later refit by Teiwaz using data from the Calamity War, restoring the Gundam to its original, complete form and improving its overall performance. The Gundam Barbatos is later equipped with a set of reactive armor on the chest and new waist thrusters taken from Ein's Schwalbe Graze to counter Gaelio's high-speed hit-and-run tactics with the Gundam Kimaris. The Gundam Barbatos receives new foot assemblies upon arriving on Earth's surface, allowing it to maneuver on the ground easily under Earth's gravity, as well as a set of forearm-mounted autocannons. The Gundam Barbatos is given one final upgrade as Tekkadan makes its way through Arbrau from Fairbanks to reach Edmonton, mounting a new set of waist thrusters and upper body armor taken from a Graze Ritter. Though the Gundam Barbatos' overall mobility is reduced in this configuration, it provides the unit with better protection and allows it to battle for prolonged periods without resupply.
Of all the Gundam-Frame mobile suits, it is the most balanced in terms of versatility and performance. When the Gundam was first found, its original cockpit was missing and during the attack in CGS base, the Third Corp hastily equipped it with both an Organic Device System and the Alaya-Vijnana System (阿頼耶識システム（アラヤシキシステム）, Araya Shiki Shisutemu) from Mikazuki's Mobile Worker. The system feeds combat data from the mobile suit directly into Mikazuki's brain via his "Whisker" spinal implants, allowing him to control the Gundam Barbatos as if it was his own body, eliminating the need to learn the controls or systems. He is initially put under massive strain when linking with the Gundam Barbatos' systems due to the massive amounts of data he is forced to process, but he quickly adjusts to the unit. The unit is typically armed with a large mace-like weapon which contains a pile bunker at the tip. It also carries a smooth-bore ballistic gun for zero-gravity missions. After being upgraded and overhauled by Teiwaz, it also carries a katana-like sword, which takes Mikazuki some time to master. For long distance travel, it can be encased in a booster-like support craft known as the JEE-M103 Kutan Type-III. Having lost the original mace during the reentry battle in Earth's atmosphere with the Gundam Kimaris, Mikazuki takes up a new mace given to Tekkadan by the Montag Company. The new mace, nicknamed Wrench Mace, features a set of jaws lined with chainsaw-like teeth at the head, allowing the Gundam Barbatos to easily grab, crush, and dismember opponents. The Gundam Barbatos is heavily damaged during the battle at Edmonton, forcing Tekkadan to send it to Saisei for repairs.

ASW-G-08 Gundam Barbatos Lupus (ガンダム・バルバトスルプス, Gandamu Barubatosu Rupusu)
The repaired upgraded form of Mikazuki's Gundam Barbatos in the series' second season. After many battles, it is sent to Saisei to be completely repaired and upgraded by Teiwaz, taking on a new form. Its overhaul of the frame increases its overall performance as well as the link with the Alaya-Vijnana System. The Gundam Barbatos Lupus is equipped with a Sword Mace, two small maces similar to its first one, two sub arms folded into its back, and two 200mm guns on its forearms. After the battle with Hashmal, the mobile suit is severely damaged with half of its limbs damaged or severed while the torso suffers severe structural damage and penetration from Hashmal's blade equipped tail.

ASW-G-08 Gundam Barbatos Lupus Rex (ガンダム・バルバトスルプスレクス, Gandamu Barubatosu Rupusu Rekusu)
The repaired form of the Gundam Barbatos Lupus using parts from the Hashmal, overhauling the Gundam Barbatos into a more bestial and ferocious shape. The Gundam is renamed "Lupus Rex", or "King of the Wolves". The enlarged forearms house powerful Rex Nail claws, hidden sub-arms in the forearms, and wrist mounted 200mm guns. Hashmal's bladed tail weapon is mounted on the upper back of the Gundam, enabling it to attack from three angles. The Gundam Barbatos Lupus Rex is also armed with a larger version of its original mace, which retains the pile bunker at the tip to impale mobile suits. Overall, the suit is tuned specifically for Mikazuki's fierce, close-range fighting style. During the final siege of Tekkadan's headquarters, the Gundam Barbatos Lupus Rex sustains critical damage from the Dáinsleif squadron's barrage from orbit, but it manages to destroy dozens of Graze units before ultimately shutting down in combat against the Reginlaze Julia.

ASW-G-11 Gundam Gusion (ガンダム・グシオン, Gandamu Gushion)
Another Gundam-Frame mobile suit produced during the Calamity War, the Gundam Gusion specializes in heavy assault and field combat. Encountered in possession of the pirate group Brewers after its discovery within a debris field, it was heavily modified for use in space and was passed down within group members before being handed to Kudal Cadel. The Gundam Gusion is armed with thick, heavy armor, painted green, that is highly resistant to both enemy fire and normal melee attacks, and has propellant tanks underneath its armor, but it has limited operational time due to its massive fuel consumption. It is armed with a thruster-assisted hammer as well as a halberd, axe, and smoke grenades. For ranged combat, it is armed with four "Buster Anchor" high-caliber cannons on its chest and a standard issue submachine gun. During the battle against Tekkadan and Turbines, the unit is heavily damaged while Kudal is killed by Mikazuki and the Gundam Barbatos. Tekkadan later claims the unit and while Orga initially intends to sell the machine to avoid having it remind Akihiro of his brother's death, Akihiro requests to be its pilot in memory of his brother. The Gundam Gusion is eventually completely stripped of its heavy armor and reworked into the ASW-G-11 Gundam Gusion Rebake.

ASW-G-11 Gundam Gusion Rebake (ガンダム・グシオンリベイク, Gandamu Gushion Ribeiku)
The Gundam Gusion Rebake is a heavily modified Gundam Gusion developed by both Tekkadan and the Turbines for Akihiro Altland's use. The heavy, bulky armor from its time under Brewers has been stripped off the frame and replaced with lighter armor, painted tan and taken from the Gundam Barbatos' spare parts, as well as a thruster-equipped shield that can be mounted as a rear skirt and shoulder thrusters, both recycled from the original configuration's back and leg armor parts. The lighter armor makes the new configuration usable under planetary gravity. The back thrusters also hide a pair of sub-arms, salvaged from a Graze, that can be deployed in battle, similar to the Hyakuri's arm system. The new head part features a special "aiming mode" configuration, which lowers a targeting camera over the unit's face. The Gundam Gusion Rebake also sports an Organic Device System and an Alaya-Vijnana System pilot seat salvaged from a Man Rodi. In contrast to its previous configuration, which specialized in heavy, close-range combat, the Gundam Gusion Rebake is designed for long to medium-range support and is armed with a specially redesigned rifle from a Graze in addition to a halberd/tomahawk with an adjustable handle hidden within the booster shield. On Earth, it utilizes a pair of smoothbore cannons to attack Gjallarhorn naval ships. Akihiro's inexperience under Earth gravity affects his precision, but he is able to adjust by synchronizing his senses with the Gundam Gusion Rebake's systems via his implants. The unit suffers significant damage during the battle at Edmonton, forcing Tekkadan to send it to Saisei for repair.

ASW-G-11 Gundam Gusion Rebake Full City (ガンダム・グシオンリベイクフルシティ, Gandamu Gushion Ribeiku Furushiti)

A heavily upgraded form of the Gundam Gusion Rebake developed by Teiwaz after incorporating newer upgrades into the suit. Similar to the Gundam Barbatos Lupus, it has enhanced performance, finely-tuned for Akihiro's close range-oriented fighting style. It is equipped with two retractable knuckle shields, forearm-mounted rocket guns, and four 120mm rifles, retaining the previous configuration's aiming mode head. The Gundam Gusion Rebake's shield is still mounted on the lower back, but can now be converted into a large pair of scissor-like claws that can bisect mobile suits. It retains the adjustable halberd from its previous form and its armor is reasonably durable; withstanding Galan Mossa's self destruct sequence of his Geirail. During the final siege of Tekkadan's headquarters, the Gundam Gusion Rebake is critically damaged by an attack from the Dáinsleif squadron and crushes Iok Kujan's Graze before being taken down by Iok's subordinates.

ASW-G-29 Gundam Astaroth (ガンダム・アスタロト, Gandamu Asutaroto)
Appearing only in the Iron-Blooded Orphans Steel Moon manga, the white and blue Gundam Astaroth is the fourth surviving Gundam-Frame mobile suit, specializing in general purpose combat and piloted by Argi Mirage. Like the Gundam Barbatos, the mobile suit is balanced in performance and versatility, with its overall appearance modified due to installation of salvaged parts from other mobile suits, most prominently its Sub-Knuckle, which is a Spinner Rodi arm modified with Hyakuren parts. The modified Sub-Knuckle acts as a shield against close ranged attacks and can hold the unit's giant folding sword, known as "Demolition Knife," with ease. It is also equipped with two side skirts called Boost Armor that counteract the unit's lack of balance due to its asymmetry, a modified Neural Connection Interface that allows Argi to control the unit with his prosthetic arm, and a currently nonfunctional Special Energy Transmission Mechanism, which allows the Gundam Astaroth to mount custom equipment. It is also shown to use normal ranged weaponry such as a rifle and a small combat knife. The mobile suit in its original and complete state was once in possession of the Warren family, a high ranking family in Gjallarhorn, after it was found on the moon and it was passed down through each generation. When the family was hit by a political and economic scandal, the parts of the Gundam Astaroth were sold, only for its head and frame to be left. It then later fell into the hands of Daddy Ted, a mobile suit collector. When Volco, the heir of the Warren family, decides to reacquire the Gundam Astaroth to restore to it to its former glory, Argi attempts to assassinate Daddy Ted, as the Gundam reminds him of the one that killed his family. Volco then later protects Argi as he gets inside the Gundam to fend off an attack by a MPM02/AC Triaina, who wants Daddy Ted killed. Later on, Argi agrees to work with Volco to search for the Gundam Astaroth's lost parts.

ASW-G-29 Gundam Astaroth Origin (ガンダム・アスタロトオリジン, Gandamu Asutaroto Orijin)
The Gundam Astaroth's original form, the Gundam Astaroth Origin, features a different armor design painted entirely red and prominently displaying the Warren family sigil on its shoulder and cockpit hatch. It also possesses different weaponry, including a 150mm shotgun and a γ Nano-Laminate sword, the scabbard of which can function as a hammer. It is also able to assume a flight mode and its Special Energy Transmission Mechanism, which transfers Ahab Particles via a cable to its sword, is functional.
ASW-G-29 Gundam Astaroth Rinascimento (ガンダム・アスタロトリナシメント, Gandamu Asutaroto Rinashimento)
A modified Gundam Astaroth after some of its original parts are recovered and modified by Tanto Tempo, a mercenary group in Jupiter under the leadership of Marco Salerno. With the concept of Renaissance, the unit is modified with much improved heavy armor as well as some of the unit's recovered parts, allowing it to become a lot stronger than the base unit. The sub arm unit is replaced with a much larger one alongside an improved booster and the left arm is replaced with the one from a Garm Rodi. However, due to the removal of the boost armor, its weight is not evenly balance and causes problems when in ground combat. Almost all of the original armament is retained with the inclusion of the new weapon, the Bastard Chopper, which is a large blade weapon equipped with a Dáinsleif railgun.

ASW-G-32 Gundam Asmoday (ガンダム・アスモデウス, Gandamu Asumodeusu)
Appearing in Iron-Blooded Orphans Urdr Hunt, the light blue Gundam Asmoday is a Gundam-Frame mobile suit having been believed to be lost during the calamity war. This mobile suit was preserved in its original calamity war condition due to it being unused. This mobile suit was discovered in a debris zone that was hard to navigate, currently this mobile suit is piloted by Range Dubrisko.
ASW-G-35 Gundam Hajiroboshi (ガンダム・端白星, Gandamu Hajiroboshi)
Appearing in Iron-Blooded Orphans Urdr Hunt, the white Gundam Hajiroboshi is the ninth surviving Gundam-Frame mobile suit. Originally named Gundam Marchosias, the suit was heavily modified from the ground up and was piloted by civilian pilot Wistario Afam who uses it in an operation known as Urdr-Hunt.

ASW-G-35 Gundam Marchosias (ガンダム・マルコシアス, Gandamu Marukoshiasu)

Appearing in Iron-Blooded Orphans Urdr Hunt, the white Gundam Marchosias is the original form of the Gundam Hajiroboshi during the Calamity War. This Mobile suit was used to combat the green Mobile Armor known as Harael.

ASW-G-47 Gundam Vual (ガンダム・ウヴァル, Gandamu Uvuaru)
Also appearing in the Iron-Blooded Orphans Steel Moon manga, the black and purple Gundam Vual is the fifth surviving Gundam-Frame mobile suit. Piloted by Rosario Leone and heavily modified by Ville Klaassen, it is designed for close combat. Due to the age of the mobile suit, its original armor was destroyed and missing after the Calamity War and that it was then installed with parts from other mobile suits. Some of its current armor once belonged to the Gundam Astaroth and was mounted intentionally to infuriate Volco. The unit performs best with hit-and-run tactics. Its overall armaments consist of a Glaive and a Mining Hammer, which can deal heavy damage even on a mobile suit equipped with Nano-Laminate Armor. It was defeated by the Gundam Astaroth, forcing Rosario abandoning the unit before he was betrayed and killed by Nanao Narorina. Later, its armor was stripped off in order to restore the Gundam Astaroth to its original look. The armorless Gundam Vual was later recovered by Jean Marco Salerno and retrofitted into the ASW-G-47 Gundam Vual Yuhana.

ASW-G-47 Gundam Vual Yuhana (ガンダム・ウヴァルユハナ, Gandamu Uvuaru Yuhana)
The Gundam Vual Yuhana is a heavily modified Gundam Vual developed by Jean Marco Salerno for Sampo Hakuri's use. Its name Yuhana came about as Sampo's sister, Yuhana, had registered it without permission. Have improved output, the unit was equipped with a sword and a chopper that can be combined into a halberd, a pair of foldable chainsaws, and a 210mm anti-material rifle for long range support. Currently, Sampo use this unit to assist Argi Mirage and the Gundam Astaroth Rinascimento.

ASW-G-48 Gundam Haagenti (ガンダム・ハーゲンティ, Gandamu Hāgenti)
Appearing in Mobile Suit Gundam Iron-Blooded Orphans MSV and in Iron Blooded Orphans Urdr Hunt. The Gundam Haagenti is a Gundam-frame owned by the Elion family, one of Gjallarhorn's seven stars families. The Gundam Haagenti is a white and pink mobile suit that was originally piloted by Angelica Elion during the Calamity war. The Gundam-Frame is equipped with two katana blades, and golden blade wire weapons that are attached to the forearms and controlled through a wire.
ASW-G-56 Gundam Gremory (ガンダム・グレモリー, Gandamu Guremorī)
Also appearing in the Iron-Blooded Orphans Steel Moon manga, the white and purple Gundam Gremory is the eighth known surviving Gundam-Frame mobile Suit. Owned by the Nadira Family of Gjallarhorn, it is equipped with Nanolaminate Coat, a more durable version of the technology used in Nanolaminate Armor, and is also equipped with a protective hood encasing the unit's head. Piloted by Deira Nadira, it is armed with a large anchor staff that has been damaged on one side, making it resemble the scythe of a Grim Reaper.
ASW-G-64 Gundam Flauros (ガンダム・フラウロス, Gandamu Furaurosu)
The sixth surviving Gundam-Frame mobile suit, the Gundam Flauros specializes more on long ranged combat and heavy artillery specialization. The frame is made the same as its predecessor Gundams, but focuses more on stability in long ranged weaponry and heavy artillery, although it sacrifices any close ranged capabilities. It is also capable of transforming into an alternate quadrupedal mode, dubbed "Shelling Mode", which allows for improved accuracy, recoil absorption, and short-term evasion. It is equipped with a multitude of long ranged weaponry, including two handheld rifles on each hip and two long-ranged railguns (dubbed the Galaxy Gun by Shino) on its back. Officially named Dáinsleif, the railguns can use special ammunition that can pierce Nano-Laminate Armor and were banned by Gjallarhorn as inhumane weapons. However, the Gundam Flauros uses conventional ammo that falls into a legal grey area. The Dáinsleif cannons are powerful enough that the recoil devastated the ground the transformed mobile suit was anchored to while the twin projectiles were capable of collapsing a large portion of a canyon from a large distance. For melee combat, it can be armed with a short sickle-like blade. The Gundam was first excavated alongside the mobile armor Hashmal within a half-metal mine that was given to Tekkadan by Teiwaz as a gift. After digging it out of the ground, it was acquired by the group to be eventually restored at Saisei and enhanced back to its operational state. It is then later assigned to Norba Shino as his personal mobile suit, who has it painted in his signature pink and dubbed the fourth Ryusei-Go. The Gundam Flauros is heavily damaged during the battle with the Arianrhod fleet and is eventually rendered into a burning wreck while its pilot is killed after Norba attempts a final charge to fire his railgun at Rustal's flagship.
ASW-G-66 Gundam Kimaris (ガンダム・キマリス, Gandamu Kimarisu)
The third surviving Gundam-Frame mobile suit, the lavender-colored Gundam Kimaris specializes in high speed close-quarters combat, working in tandem with Gaelio Bauduin's hit-and-run combat style. Its frame is well-armored and equipped with multiple thrusters with some concealed inside the leg and foot armor. It is equipped with a powerful lance known as Gungnir with two built-in 120 mm cannons, two folding combat knives, and "slash disk" projectile launchers in the shoulders. In addition, it can be given an optional booster pack for enhanced mobility. The Gundam Kimaris was first piloted by Gaelio Bauduin's ancestor, the first Sir Bauduin, a legendary pilot during the Calamity War whose heroism helped end the war and made the Bauduin family one of Gjallarhorn's Seven Stars. It spent most of its postwar history as a ceremonial symbol of Gjallarhorn's power while it was gradually forgotten by the general populace. Eventually it is given to Gaelio to pilot and is deployed in combat for the first time since the Calamity War. During the descent to Earth, the Gundam Kimaris is refit into the Gundam Kimaris Trooper.

ASW-G-66 Gundam Kimaris Trooper (ガンダム・キマリストルーパー, Gandamu Kimarisu Torūpā)
A modified Gundam Kimaris designed for use under Earth's gravity and complimenting Gaelio's preference for high-speed rushing attacks. The unit's overall armor has been heavily modified, most notably replacing the shoulder armor and extra leg boosters for a new rear skirt thruster. It is also equipped with a pair of sub-arms mounted on the hips. The unit's main strength is its ability to assume an alternate form known as "Trooper Form", transforming the legs into a hovering assembly with resemblance to a centaur. Trooper Form discards overall mobility for charging power. The Gundam Kimaris Trooper is equipped with the Destroyer Lance, a shield, a sword, and several mines stored in the rear skirt. The unit is heavily damaged during a duel with McGillis Fareed's V08-1228 Grimgerde, though its pilot secretly survived in an injured state. Official records claim the remains of the Gundam Kimaris were returned to the Bauduin Family after the battle, though in actuality, the Gundam Kimaris Trooper was delivered to the Arianrhod Fleet under orders from Rustal Elion and secretly overhauled into the ASW-G-XX Gundam Vidar.

ASW-G-XX Gundam Vidar (ガンダム・ヴィダール, Gandamu Vidāru)

Assembled from a salvaged Gundam Kimaris, the mysterious blue Gundam Vidar is owned by Gaelio Bauduin, also known as Vidar, who joined forces with Gjallarhorn's Arianhod Fleet after he is betrayed and left for dead by McGillis Fareed. Known also as "Gjallarhorn Unit No.21" at first, the Kimaris is secretly overhauled and refurbished with the latest top-of-the-line technology possessed by Gjallarhorn by Rustal Elion's orders. The Gundam Vidar is designed for close-combat and hit-and-run tactics and is equipped with a third Ahab Reactor that creates a different Ahab Wave signature and masks the frame's original reactor signatures. It is later revealed to be equipped with a unique pseudo Alaya-Vijnana System, known as Alaya-Vijnana Type-E, which functions through Ein Dalton's salvaged and implanted brain. The system allows the Gundam Vidar to become more savage and agile in combat, allowing Ein's brain to take total control of the Gundam while bypassing its pilot and protecting him from the neural side effects of a normal Alaya-Vijnana connection. Unlike the other Gundam-Frame mobile suits, the Gundam Vidar is not named after a Duke of Hell; rather, its name is derived from Víðarr, the Norse god of revenge. Armament-wise, it is armed with a rifle, a rapier with six disposable blades mounted on the sides with two large sheaths, and a pair of pistols mounted on the front hip. Its feet also contain a dual switchblade construction that enables it to extend blades from its toes and heels; enhancing its attack capabilities in melee combat. After revealing his true identity to the world and declaring war on McGillis, Gaelio has the Gundam Vidar "camouflage" armor removed, converting the unit into the Gundam Kimaris Vidar.

ASW-G-66 Gundam Kimaris Vidar (ガンダム・キマリスヴィダール, Gandamu Kimarisu Vidāru)

The Gundam Kimaris Vidar is the Gundam Vidar's "true form," having had the blue "camouflage" armor and third Ahab Reactor removed and replaced with lavender and black armor resembling the Gundam Kimaris Trooper configuration. The Gundam Kimaris Vidar is equipped with shields on back-mounted arms that can be moved to defend from any direction. Its armaments include a large lance weapon containing two Dáinsleif railguns and a sword. The lance can be braced on the shields to allow for firing Dáinsleif warheads loaded behind the shields. The unit's leg armor also features drill-like spikes hidden in the knees. The unit is heavily damaged after a dual from the Gundam Bael, which is also damaged as well. This variant of Gundam Kimaris has been existed since during the Calamity War era.

ASW-G-71 Gundam Dantalion (ガンダム・ダンタリオン, Gandamu Dantarion)
Appearing in the collectible card arcade game Gundam Try-Age and later on the Steel Moon Manga, the blue and white Gundam Dantalion is the seventh surviving Gundam-Frame mobile suit, initially piloted by Zaza Fossil. Unlike other frames, it is lightly armored and possesses two forms when docked with either of the two separate enhancement packs: T-Booster and B-Booster. When docked with the T-Booster, it gains flight capabilities as well as the booster to convert into giant arms for close combat, known as Half Cowl Mode. The B-Booster replaces the lower half of the mobile suit with specialized parts, allowing it for better mobility on the ground. Combining both in Cowl mode will form the Full Cowl and maximise the performance of the Dantalion with the aspects of both boosters. Armament wise, it is armed with a bayonet rifle and large forked spear.

=== Valkyrja-Frame Suits ===
The Valkyrja Frame, produced during the late stages of the Calamity War, is an advanced but not very well known mobile suit frame, as it was first produced at the same time as, and was completely overshadowed by, the much more prolific Gundam Frame. Despite its obscurity, its performance and track record were impressive enough for Gjallarhorn to use the Valkyrja Frame as the source of inspiration for the mass-produced Graze Frame. It is speculated that because of the frame's relative obscurity, less than ten units were ever produced.

V08-1228 Grimgerde (グリムゲルデ, Gurimugerude)
One of the fabled Valkyrja-Frame mobile suits produced during the late stages of the Calamity War, the Grimgerde is a high-performance, all-purpose mobile suit assigned to McGillis Fareed under his guise as Montag. It is equipped with a rifle with an enlarged horizontally mounted drum magazine, two rotating shields on each forearm, and two golden-bladed swords that can be stored on the shields. Performance-wise, the Grimgerde was designed with emphasis on mobility and nimbleness, making it unmatched in space and negating the effects of gravity on Earth's surface. As a downside, the Grimgerde is very light compared to other mobile suits, meaning its pilot has to be aware of their center of gravity when executing close-range attacks.

V08Re-0526 Helmwige Reincar (ヘルムヴィーゲ・リンカー, Herumuvīge Rinkā)

Designed to be an escort unit and piloted by Isurugi Camice, the Helmwige Reincar is the V08-1228 Grimgerde outfitted with heavy-duty armor modeled after the sixth Valkyrja-Frame, the Helmwige. As a result, the unit's reactor is re-tuned, sacrificing overall mobility for frame stability. Since McGillis' position as a member of the Seven Stars prohibits him from using the Grimgerde, it is assigned to Isurugi. Its primary weapon is the Valkyrja Buster Sword, a large broadsword that dwarfs most mobile suits and was specifically designed to battle mobile armor. The horns on the unit's head can also emit directed electricity. The "Reincar" in the unit's name comes from the word "reincarnation," referring to how the unit is actually the Grimgerde outfitted to look like the original Helmwige. The Mobile Suit was heavily damaged after Isurugi shielded McGillis from Kimaris Vidar's knee drill, effectively killing the pilot as well as bisecting the Mobile Suit.
V03-0907 Oltlinde (オルトリンデ, Orutorinde)
Second of the fabled Valkyrja-Frame mobile Suits known to exist, the white and green Oltlinde is owned by the Jizin family. Characterized by its unique antenna on its head, it was originally used to fire Dáinsleif railguns. It is currently piloted by Jijil Jizin, head of Gjallarhorn's internal regulatory unit - Ollerus, it is armed with a double bladed staff that can be converted into dual blades.

=== Geirail-Frame ===
The Geirail Frame is a Gjallarhorn-produced mobile suit frame that predates the Graze Frame. While based on the Valkyrja Frame like its successor, it was gradually phased out of Gjallarhorn service in favor of its more versatile successor.

EB-04 Geirail (ゲイレール)
A mobile suit design predating the development of the EB-06 Graze. After the Graze's mass-production rollout, the Geirail was gradually phased out, but some units still remain in operation with local Gjallarhorn branches and mercenary groups. Armament-wise, it is equipped with a rifle, a collapsible tomahawk, and pick-axe like weapon. In addition, it can be equipped with boosters extending from the lower back for mobility under gravity. Galan Mossa's unit has a self destruct sequence installed to prevent his capture or any data from the mobile suit's computers from being stolen.

EB-04jc4 Geirail Scharfrichter (ゲイレール・シャルフリヒター)
A derivative from the Geirail Frame featuring heavy armor, it is used by the Galan Mossa's mobile suit team and conventionally armed with a rifle and a pick-axe like weapon. It also possesses large shoulder guards and comes equipped with large boosters on the lower back for mobility under gravity. It is also said to excel in melee when properly equipped.

=== Graze-Frame Suits ===
The Graze Frame is a simplified version of the Grimgerde's Valkyrja Frame, Much of the Grimgerde's design philosophy was analyzed and adapted by Gjallarhorn into what would eventually become the EB-06 Graze after the Calamity War, including the unit's highly sensitive head sensors and simple construction to minimize energy consumption.

EB-05S Schwalbe Graze (シュヴァルベ・グレイズ, Shuvarube Gureizu)
A custom Graze piloted by McGillis Fareed and Gaelio Bauduin, colored blue and purple, respectively. The Schwalbe Graze is a custom variant of the mass-produced EB-06 Graze's prototype, equipped with high-output boosters for increased thrust and power in exchange for stability and control, requiring a skilled pilot to operate. While most units are typically armed with the Graze's usual armaments, Gaelio Bauduin's unit is equipped with a special lance weapon with a built-in mini version of the Graze's 120 mm rifle, mounted on the right arm. Both units are equipped with a wire claw weapon on the left arm, which can be used to snare enemies. Gaelio's unit is later assigned to Ein Dalton once Gaelio begins piloting the Gundam Kimaris, though the lance weapon is removed from its loadout. The purple Schwalbe Graze is later critically damaged in battle. McGillis's unit is later assigned to his subordinate, Isurugi Camice, as he takes Carta Issue's place. The blue unit is later abandoned when Isurugi begins piloting the Helmwige Reincar. The ultimate fate of both Schwalbe Grazes are unknown.
EB-06 Graze (グレイズ, Gureizu)
The mass-production mobile suit of the Gjallarhorn forces, developed using the design philosophy of the V08-1228 Grimgerde and specially designed for versatility and ease of use, featuring several specialized variants for different circumstances. The standard Graze is typically painted green and armed with a 120mm rifle and a battle axe, with the option of replacing the rifle for a shield. The EB-06s Graze Commander Type variant is identical to the standard version, save for a special antenna on the head that increases communications range. The purple-colored space variant, used by Gjallarhorn's Ares base, features added back-mounted boosters to increase mobility and can replace their rifles with magazine-fed bazookas. A special variant of the Graze exists, painted gray with a unique targeting head, designed to wield the illegal Dáinsleif railgun weapon. All Graze variants feature a spherical sensor in the head, which can be deployed for more precise measurement and long-distance observation. Blue units were used by McGillis Fareed's revolutionary faction.

EB-06j Graze Ground Type (グレイズ(地上戦仕様), Gureizu (Chijou sen Shiyou))
Used by Gjallarhorn forces on Earth, this variant of the Graze is painted gray and features a wider foot assembly and thigh-mounted thrusters. The Ground Type utilizes a Battle Blade sword in exchange for the standard-issue axe and is used on Earth during the raid on the Millennium Island. Another color variant painted hazel is used during the battle in Edmonton.
EB-06/tc Graze Custom (グレイズ改, Gureizu Kai)
A Graze reconstructed by Tekkadan from salvaged parts of Orlis Stenja and Crank Zent's units and heavily customized, though it still reads as Crank Zent's Graze on sensor profiles. It was meant to be sold for raising Tekkadan's funding but after the Orcus Company reveals their betrayal, it was given to the Human Debris leader, Akihiro Atland to use. The Graze Custom is equipped with a back-mounted booster and is overall lighter than a standard Graze, making it faster and more maneuverable, especially in space. As the unit lacks an Alaya-Vijnana System pilot seat, Akihiro is forced to rely on his own skill and intuition in battle rather than the unit's combat data. The unit's armaments consist of the Graze's standard 120mm rifle and battle axe. It can also be augmented with a shoulder mounted bazooka and a booster pack. After Akihiro claims the captured Gundam Gusion, the unit is given to Norba Shino and upgraded to become the Ryusei-Go.

EB-06/tc2 Ryusei-Go (流星号, Ryūsei-gō)

Also known as the "Graze Custom 2" (グレイズ改弐, Gureizu Kai Ni), the Ryusei-Go is a further enhanced Graze Custom developed by both Tekkadan and Teiwaz. Piloted by Norba Shino, it excels in space combat due to the installation of extra vernier thrusters on its shoulders. The unit is also equipped with armor parts from a Hyakuren unit, which increase the unit's durability and adds hardpoints for docking with a Kutan Type-III in exchange for also increasing its weight. It is additionally coated in pink-hued Nano-Laminate Armor paint, which quickly becomes Norba's signature color. Norba notes that the unit's systems do not integrate well with an Alaya-Vijnana System, salvaged from one of Brewers' Man Rodi units, but is adequate for general use. The unit also continues to read on sensors as Crank Zent's Graze. The name Ryusei-Go is given to the unit by Norba right before its first sortie and means "meteor" or "shooting star" in Japanese, with the suffix gō (号) normally being associated with the name of a vehicle such as a train or ship. The unit's new designation is remarked upon by Ride Mass and Nadi as being somewhat ridiculous. The unit is apparently the second machine Norba names Ryusei-Go, the first being his original TK-53 CGS Mobile Worker, which was also painted pink. Thanks to extensive tuning by Teiwaz' crew, the Ryusei-Go's performance is on par with the EB-05S Schwalbe Graze and EB-06r Graze Ritter. The unit is totaled by the EB-AX2 Graze Ein, though Norba survives. The unit's Alaya-Vijnana cockpit is later salvaged and installed on the STH-16/tc Shiden Custom.
EB-06r Graze Ritter (グレイズ・リッター, Gureizu Rittā)
Graze units in the Carta Corps of Gjallarhorn's Outer Earth Orbit Regulatory Joint Fleet are painted teal with a prominent fin/antenna on the head and are equipped with unique shoulder armor. The Graze Ritter is designed for orbital combat and boasts improved mobility over the standard space variant Graze. Its main armaments are identical to the standard Graze but instead of an axe, the Graze Ritter is equipped with a broadsword. Carta Issue's Graze Ritter, the EB-06rs Graze Ritter Commander Type, features red paint accents and slightly different upper body armor. When landing on Earth, the Graze Ritter can use giant surfboard-like atmospheric shields to withstand entry on Earth's atmosphere and features thigh-mounted thrusters for improved surface mobility. A variant of the Commander Type, painted blue with yellow highlights is later used by McGillis Fareed once he takes Carta Issue's place, along with the other regular Ritter units changed from teal to light blue as well.
EB-06Q Graze Schild (グレイズシルト, Gureizu Shiruto)
A Graze variant utilized by Arianrhod fleet, it features a different head sensor and comes equipped with a shield. It also has a red stripe painted over the middle of the head for identification purposes and is equipped with external boosters on the back of the waist. Beside the usual armament carried by typical Grazes, it can also be armed with an exclusive halberd and wall shield combination for melee combat. It is mainly used by Arianrhod for siege warfare in a melee heavy battlefield.
EB-06/T2C Regal Lily (リーガルリリー, Rīgaru Rirī)
Piloted by Tanto Tempo executive Jean Marco Salerno, the Regal Lily is a heavily customized EB-06 Graze, originally captured by Tekkadan and purchased through Teiwaz. The unit has been specifically modified to reinforce the legs, allowing the use of the Bellows Axe, a massive weapon with a variable shape. It also possesses a heat-resistant mantle.
EB-06N Graze Stachel (グレイズシュタッヘル, Gureizu Shutahheru)
A custom Graze variant used by Gjallarhorn's internal regulatory unit, it is armed with a standard rifle, wire claw, and stun rod. It is also capable of specialized maneuvers impossible for other Mobile Suits due to the inclusion of folding manipulative appendages on the shoulder, feet, and knees as well as shock absorbers to minimize the noise. Using these abilities, it is usually used for high mobility attacks and hit-and-run tactics
Adler (アードラ, Ādora)
An EB-06 Graze given by Ville Klaassen to Rosario Leone, who heavily customized and assigned it to Tanto Tempo pilot Nanao Narorina to escort the ASW-G-47 Gundam Vual. The Adler is painted white and features unique head, shoulder, leg, and backpack parts. It is equipped with a standard rifle and an anti-MS claw much like the one equipped on the EB-05 Schwalbe Graze.

EB-AX2 Graze Ein (グレイズ・アイン, Gureizu Ain)
One of several experimental prototype Grazes, developed when Gjallarhorn was still experimenting with the Alaya-Vijnana System after the Calamity War's end. The unit was kept in deep storage in an incomplete state until McGillis shows it to Gaelio, encouraging him to allow a mortally wounded Ein to undergo surgery to have the Alaya-Vijnana implanted. According to a diagram on a display screen, Ein is connected to the unit, having his body reduced to merely his torso and head and linked via three "Whiskers." This mobile suit is comparably larger than average ones, towering even that of Gundam Frames. Its main weapons include built-in pile drivers on its forearms, a pair of giant hatchets stored on its back, and machine gun turrets hidden on each shoulder. The Alaya-Vijnana System further enhances the mobile suit's spatial awareness, allowing Ein to be able to react in the blink of an eye. In addition Gaelio asserts Ein's mastery of the Alaya-Vijnana System as being greater than any Tekkadan member or Human Debris. The unit is shut down by Mikazuki after fully syncing with the Gundam Barbatos, stabbing the Graze's cockpit with the Gundam Barbatos' longsword and killing Ein in the process. After Ein is killed, his brain is salvaged and installed into the Gundam Vidar.
AEB-06L Hloekk Graze (フレック・グレイズ, Furekku Gureizu)
An export-grade Graze variant used by the Arbrau Defense Forces with some pilots being members from Tekkadan's Earth Branch. It is conventionally equipped with a submachine gun, an axe, and head-mounted missile hatches. While manufactured by Gjallarhorn, it is intended to be sold on the market as a cheap option for private use. Thus, it is not a top of the line model compared to the Gjallarhorn's Grazes, which are superior in quality and performance. Due to being based on a simplified Graze Frame, it is cheaper and easier to operate compared to other Mobile Suits. Iok Kujan's fleet also uses purple-colored Hloekk Grazes as loaders for its Dáinsleif railgun-equipped Graze units.

=== Reginlaze Frame Suits ===
The Reginlaze Frame is the planned successor of the Graze Frame. While it shares a simplified frame like its predecessor, it is reinforced and optimized for increased power and firepower. In contrast, the Graze was intended to be used as an armed peacemaker and deterrence against insurrection. It was developed in secret and quietly issued to key individuals in the Arianrhod fleet. Its classified nature is secretive enough that important Gjallarhorn officers outside of Arianrhod have only heard rumors about its existence and operational status. It is also recent enough that there are only 18 units currently constructed, with all assigned to ace pilots in Arianrhod.

EB-08 Reginlaze (レギンレイズ, Reginreizu)
The planned successor to the EB-06 Graze, developed in secret and given to select individuals in the Arianrhod Fleet. Julieta Julis' Reginlaze is specially tuned for higher performance and is armed with Twin Pile wired anchors.

EB-08s Iok's Reginlaze

Iok Kujan's custom commander variant of the Reginlaze, painted black and gold. Due to suggestions by Iok's subordinates and mechanics, the unit is tuned and outfitted for ranged support, being equipped with a prototype long-range railgun and the same Knight Blade used by the Graze Ritter. The Reginlaze is heavily damaged by the Mobile Armor Hashmal.

EB-08jjc Reginlaze Julia (レギンレイズ・ジュリア, Reginreizu Julia)
An experimental, upgraded variant of the EB-08 Reginlaze, the Reginlaze Julia dwarfs even the Graze Ein in terms of height at a towering 29.9 meters. Though the standard Reginlaze is specially tuned to be easy to pilot, the Reginlaze Julia's performance is pushed to the absolute limit. As a result, the unit requires the most skilled of pilots to operate effectively. This caused chief technician Yamazin Toka much strife in finding a capable test pilot until Julieta Julis volunteered herself. Yamazin later formally names the unit after its new pilot. The unit's design is based directly on the EB-AX2 Graze Ein's design and combat data, albeit tuned for space rather than ground combat. It is armed with a pair of long, wrist-mounted Julian Swords that can be converted into serrated blade-whips, alongside internal Vulcan guns in the shoulder guards. It is also armed with blades mounted on special foot armor that can be retracted and reconfigured to allow the unit to stand on a surface. The unit is heavily damaged by Mikazuki and his Gundam Barbatos Lupus Rex with Julieta deeply injure to the bone. The unit is then fully repaired, and is outfitted with a large sword and shield, and participated in the final battle against Tekkadan on Mars.

=== Rodi-Frame Suits ===
The Rodi Frame is one of several mobile suit frames produced during the Calamity War, serving as the main mobile suit frame for the Outer Sphere for many years. The Rodi Frame is incredibly versatile; suits built with it are primarily designed for use in space and are often equipped with extremely heavy armor because of the lack of gravity. It is a common civilian-use frame because of this versatility.

UGY-R38 Spinner Rodi (スピナ・ロディ, Supinā Rodi)
A mass-produced, heavily armored mobile suit for civilian use in general-purpose space activities such as colony construction/repair and defense. A complement of Spinner Rodi units is commandeered by revolting Dort colony workers intending to fight Gjallarhorn, but the mobile suits and their weapons were sabotaged by Gjallarhorn some time before, making them useless in the field and causing a one-sided slaughter. The Spinner Rodi is equipped with a rifle with underslung grenade launcher and a melee weapon known as the Boost Hammer which is composed of a staff with a blade held parallel to the staff and two rockets on either end to provide more power. As seen with the Garm Rodi's, the Boost Hammer can be converted into a heavy saber by extending the staff outside of the blade's housing.
UGY-R41 Man Rodi (マン・ロディ, Man Rodi)
The mass-produced mobile suit used by the space pirate group Brewers, restored from a number of Calamity War-era Rodi Frames, it is extremely well armored and powerful but has a limited operational time due to massive fuel consumption. Its basic armament consists of a handheld sub-machine gun, smoke grenades, and an axe/hammer weapon. After the second battle with Brewers, the nine surviving machines are claimed by Tekkadan with the intent of selling them off as Orga does not want to use machines that were related to Masahiro's death. Despite their intent to sell them, Tekkadan uses some of their salvaged parts for the Ryusei-Go and the Gundam Gusion Rebake. In addition, Tekkadan's Earth branch eventually retrofits a number of them as orange and white units modified for ground use, now known as Landman Rodi. Several purple and brown units were used by JPT Trust during their battle against Tekkadan.

UGY-R41 Landman Rodi (ランドマン・ロディ, Randoman Rodi)
Former Brewers Man Rodi units converted and used by Tekkadan's Earth branch. They retain their Alaya-Vijnana Systems, which help improve their mobility as they are converted for use under gravity with the addition of legs that are more suitable for walking on land. Their armament is identical to their Brewers counterparts. After the Arbrau-SAU border war, the remaining Landman Rodi's were recalled back to Mars. Despite the name and new configuration, the Landman Rodi is still capable of space use.
UGY-R41/H Hakuri Rodi (ハクリ・ロディ, Hakuri Rodi)
Customized Man Rodis used by the Hakuri siblings, elder brother Sampo and younger sister Yuhana. Originally found in a debris zone lacking the head and cockpit, the units lack the Alaya-Vijnana System. Sampo's unit, distinguished by blue accents, is equipped with a hatchet-like Chopper. Yuhana's yellow-accented unit is equipped with a larger axe weapon equipped with a retractable chain mace.
UGY-R41/T2C Labrys (ラブルス, Raburusu)
A customized version of the Man Rodi, the Labrys is utilized by the organization Tanto Tempo as a VIP escort. It is equipped with a Hammer Chopper axe/hammer weapon, a 90mm machine gun, and grenades.

UGY-R45 Garm Rodi (ガルム・ロディ, Garumu Rodi)
A Rodi-Frame unit utilized by the Dawn Horizon Corps space pirates, the Garm Rodi is equipped with a Boost Hammer melee weapon, one shield mounted on the left shoulder, and a rifle. A commander variant exists with grey color scheme and an additional shield on the right shoulder along with a crest on the head.

=== Teiwaz-Frame Suits ===
The Teiwaz Frame is the first completely new mobile suit frame produced since the end of the Calamity War 300 years ago. The frame's design is based on ancient mobile suit blueprints discovered by Teiwaz engineers that were planned to be developed near the end of the war. Mobile suits utilizing the Teiwaz frame are equipped with salvaged war-era Ahab Reactors due to Gjallarhorn's monopoly on the technology in modern times. While a versatile mobile suit frame, manufacturing has proven difficult as the suit's complexity prevents rapid mass production.
STH-05 Hyakuren (百錬, Hyakuren)
Teiwaz's primary mobile suit, based on a late Calamity War design and utilizing Calamity War-era Ahab Reactors, typically painted blue. It is armed with a saber and a rifle. In addition, it can exchange its rifle for a drum fed grenade launcher. Allegedly, only 44 Hyakuren units exist. The unit's name literally means "well-trained" or "well-disciplined" in Japanese. Amida Arca's personal pink-hued Hyakuren unit, the STH-05/AC Hyakuren Amida Custom, is one of the original nine units built known as the "Single Numbers," personally gifted to the Turbines and eight other subsidiary Teiwaz branches from McMurdo Barriston. Amida's Hyakuren boasts overall slightly better performance compared to the standard version, but is otherwise identical.

STH-05R Rouei (漏影, Rouei)
A modified Hyakuren used for covert operations that would be disastrous if Teiwaz's participation were made public, piloted by Lafter and Azee while descending to Earth under orders by Naze. The specific Rouei used by Lafter is in fact Amida's custom Hyakuren. The Rouei configuration is armed with a mace and submachine gun pair with the submachine gun replaceable with a rifle or grenade launcher. In addition, it is also capable of ground combat under gravity unlike the Hyakuren, which is specifically designed for use in space. Both Rouei units are heavily damaged and totalled by Graze Ein in Edmonton, but their pilots survive.

STH-14s Hyakuri (百里, Hyakuri)
A high-mobility fighter jet-like mobile suit, it can maneuver at high speed in space by assuming a flight mode, involving folding the arms away into its large back-mounted booster assembly. The unit is specially designed for reconnaissance and hit-and-run missions in space due to its high speed and maneuverability. It is armed with two foldable shoulder mounted rifles. Alternately, it can wield one of the rifles in its hand while the other hand can use one of two knuckle shields for defense and melee combat.

STH-14/T2C Kallisto (カッリスト, Karrisuto)
A custom version of Teiwaz's STH-14s Hyakuri, the Kallisto is piloted by Tanto Tempo executive Jean Marco Salerno. It is modified with the ASW-G-29 Gundam Astaroth Origin's Variable Blade Shields, originally part of the Gundam's shoulder armor. On the Kallisto, the weapons are mounted on the forearms. The unit is also optionally equipped with a quad-barrel rocket launcher.

STH-20 Hekija (辟邪, Hekija)
A new mobile suit design intended as a successor for the STH-05 Hyakuren and STH-14s Hyakuri, using combat and design data from both. Like the Shiden, it was completely developed from scratch but retains elements of its predecessors' design in its chassis. Unlike the Shiden, it is still in trial stages and took even longer than the Shiden to develop due to a lack of a mass-production line. The Hekija was designed to embody the Hyakuri's mobility while retaining the Hyakuren's power output. Through the usage of hidden thrusters in its back and feet in the Assault Form configuration, it can be used to for most forms of combat based on the user's preference. Emphasis was also made on ease of use and minimizing strain on the pilot in order to compete against growing numbers of Alaya-Vijnana equipped Human Debris on the battlefield. Armament-wise, it is armed with a bayonet-equipped rifle, a pair of wrist mounted blades, and a machete with a sickle-like protrusion coming out of the front at the tip. Although many of the Turbines' Hekijas were destroyed or damaged during the battle with Gjallarhorn, at least two units survived, with one sent to Tekkadan as a keepsake from the Turbines and given to Hush Middy.
MPM02/AC Triaina (トリアイナ, Toriaina)
Appearing only in the Iron-Blooded Orphans Steel Moon manga, it is a customized Hyakuren sold by Teiwaz, used by assassins to kill Daddy Ted. Originally meant for anti-mobile suit battle, the unit has lighter armor and utilizes hit-and-run tactics to assassinate VIPs. Its sensors are enhanced, and it carries two folding knives in its shoulder armor. The suit can also use an assault rifle as its ranged weaponry.

=== Io-Frame Suits ===
The Io Frame is a mass-produced version of the Teiwaz Frame. While developed from scratch, it retains many features from the Teiwaz Frame. Consequentially, Teiwaz mechanics are instantly familiar with the frame's properties. It was developed with versatility in mind and excels when the mobile suit is operated in groups.
STH-16 Shiden (獅電, Shiden)
A mass-produced unit based on the Teiwaz Frame, the Shiden is a versatile and well-balanced mobile suit designed to give Teiwaz's various branches, particularly Tekkadan, a combat edge. The Shiden is armed with an assault rifle, a large shield, and a bladed weapon known as a Partisan which can act as a sword or as a polearm due to its retractable shaft. A customized variant of the Shiden, featuring a different visor with a horn and a white and silver paint job, is given to Orga Itsuka, but he has yet to pilot it. Due to Orga's death, Eugene is piloting the unit.

STH-16/tc Shiden Custom (Ryusei-Go)/(Raiden-Go) (獅電改(流星号)/(雷電号), Shiden-kai (Ryūsei-gō)/(Raiden-gō))
Norba Shino's pink-hued customized variant named after the original Ryusei-Go that was totaled during the battle at Edmonton. Unlike regular Shiden units, Norba's unit possesses the Alaya-Vijnana cockpit from the original Ryusei-Go and is designed for high mobility with more thrusters on the body. In addition, the large shield is replaced with a small rectangular buckler shield to allow better maneuvering in melee combat. After Shino is assigned the Gundam Flauros, the Shiden Custom is given to Ride Mass to fight the mobile armor Hashmal. After the Hashmal's destruction, Norba entrusts the unit to Ride, who repaints it a golden-yellow color with a blue lightning bolt emblem on its left shoulder with another buckler and a new visor equipped. Ride renames the unit "Raiden-Go," meaning "lightning" in Japanese, much to Norba's dismay.

=== Hexa-Frame Suits ===
The Hexa Frame is a unique mobile suit configuration in the respect that its cockpit is located in the head or backpack rather than the torso and the legs can be of the standard type or uniquely jointed to allow for grappling in space. Compared to other mobile suit frames, Hexa-Frame suits are known to have a higher pilot survival rate, offsetting their high attrition rate from lack of armor by retaining the number of experienced pilots thanks to their cockpit's unique design. Widely produced during the Calamity War, they are second only to the Rodi Frame in terms of the number produced from that time period.

IPP-0032S Gilda (ジルダ, Jiruda)
A mobile suit used by the SAU's defense forces, it is equipped with a rifle, a sword club, and a twin pile-driver equipped shield on the left wrist. A standard work-use variant has also seen use in space in the Oceanian Federation's space colonies while armed with a crowbar and wired anchor gun.
IPP-66305 Hugo (ユーゴー, Yūgō)
A mobile suit for space use that is used by Dawn Horizon Corps and JPT Trust, it is armed with either a rifle and large saber or with two large scimitars mounted on its back for storage. It also possesses a pair of concealed rocket tubes on the either side of the head. Its legs are reverse-jointed and designed to help grapple enemy Mobile Suits in space debris fields and also come with two wire claws on the hips to snare enemy units.

=== Mobile Armors ===
Mobile armors are a terrifying and dangerous type of mobile weapon technology deployed during the Calamity War. These gigantic weapons are controlled by an artificial intelligence and were feared by the people during the period. As the use of artificial intelligence removes the factor of ethics from the mobile armor, it is capable of unrestrained violence, with hundreds of millions of deaths being associated with the machines. It was not until the appearance of the Gundam Frame that the threat was erased. Mobile suits were originally created to counter mobile armors and the two are essentially arch-enemies. Ultimately, a quarter of the Earth's population died at their hands before they were either destroyed or shut down. After the Calamity War, they were banned from being used or created again and were purged from the general populace's memory. Like mobile suits, mobile armors use Ahab Reactor as main power source, have a frame made from rare metal, and are protected by Nanolaminate Armor.

Pluma (プルーマ, Purūma)
A small but destructive mobile armor sub-weapon created during the last stages of the Calamity War. The Pluma was a forbidden weapon created in the image of a trilobite/horseshoe crab. Though small in size for a mobile armor, it is feared due to its artificial intelligence, which lacks any concept of morals or ethics and is specifically programmed to kill as many people as possible. One is found alongside the Gundam Flauros and a much larger mobile armor, the Hashmal, in a half-metal mine on Mars. The discovery is brought back to Saisei to be researched and was accidentally reactivated, going berserk and destroying the hangar before it was shut down. It is armed with a pair of clawed arms, a nose mounted railgun, and a drill on its tail. The Hashmal is capable of producing Pluma en masse, creating a swarm to support it. While not considerably powerful individually, they can overwhelm mobile suits with sheer numbers. Unlike mobile suits and their parent mobile armors, Plumas themselves do not use Ahab Reactors for power; instead relying on wireless energy transfer from their parent Hashmal. After the destruction of the Hashmal, all Plumas are shut down due to a lack of power. Its name is Latin for feather.
Hashmal (ハシュマル, Hashumaru)
A large, unmanned mobile armor created during the Calamity War, the Hashmal was used for area dominance during the war and was feared by the people of that time. The Hashmal is designed for ground combat and is overall avian-like in design. It is feared for its artificial intelligence, which lacks all concept of morals or ethics and is specifically programmed to kill as many people as possible. It is armed with a powerful beam cannon on its front head, a lost technology that was not replicated in modern times, able to destroy everything except mobile suits with Nano-Laminate Armor. For close quarters combat, it is equipped with a flexible tail equipped with a blade as well as two clawed feet armed with kinetic energy shot launchers. It also can produce several Plumas from its body, and is capable of self regeneration. The mobile armor is reactivated during a standoff with Iok and McGillis, immediately setting its sites on Chryse, the largest nearby population center. However, Iok manages to intercept the machine and redirect its attention towards the nearby Agricultural Center. Later, thanks to Chad Chadan, it was switch back to its original route to Chryse. Gundam-Frame units equipped with Alaya-Vijnana Systems also feature a limiter that activates when in proximity of a mobile armor, preventing the Gundam's pilot from overexerting themselves. Mikazuki manages to deactivate Barbatos' Alaya-Vijnana System limiter; enabling him to achieve the agility and reflexes needed to destroy Hashmal. Several of the Hashmal's parts, particularly its tail weapon, are later salvaged and used to refit the heavily damaged Gundam Barbatos Lupus into the Gundam Barbatos Lupus Rex.

=== Tekkadan/Chryse Guard Security ===
TK-53 CGS Mobile Worker (CGS モビルワーカー, CGS Mobiru Wākā)
The CGS' workhorse unit, it is armed with either two mounted 30mm guns or missile pods, several smoke grenade launchers, and is propelled by three omni-directional wheels powered by a hydrogen engine. In addition, the cockpit and weapons are mounted on a 360 degree swivel; enabling it to react to threats in any direction. While it is a common and versatile combat unit, it is outdated compared to Gjallerhorn's Mobile Workers and all but useless against modern, rarer, and much larger, mobile suits as the latter use Nano-Laminate Armor for ballistic protection. Many of CGS' Mobile Workers are equipped with an Alaya-Vijnana System pilot seat, which features a cable that can connect to "Whisker" spinal implants, allowing the pilot increased reaction time and spatial awareness by feeding combat data directly into the pilot's brain, mitigating the need for extensive training or literacy. Later versions are upgraded by replacing their original guns with 60 mm cannons.

TK-53/s CGS Mobile Worker Space Type (CGS モビルワーカー, CGS Mobiru Wākā)
After heading into space on the Isaribi, Tekkadan converts several Mobile Worker units into the TK-53/s CGS Mobile Worker Space Type, which replace the unit's standard tires with vernier thrusters and adds a propellant tank. While not very fast or versatile in space compared to mobile suits, they are quite useful for boarding enemy ships due to their small size, enabling Tekkadan to use their expertise in infantry tactics to capture any enemy vessel.

TK-56 Tekkadan Mobile Worker (鉄華団モビルワーカー, Tekkadan Mobiru Wākā)
A mobile worker acquired by Tekkadan after their return to Mars, it is armed with a chin-mounted antipersonnel machine gun, two automatic cannons on either side, and a pair of six tubed missile launchers on the back of the unit. Like the TK-53, it is propelled by three omni-directional wheels powered by a hydrogen engine and is mounted on a 360 degree swivel. Unlike its predecessor, the unit is significantly larger and requires a pilot and a gunner to operate with the gunner using an electronic periscope for aiming and view magnification while firing at least a portion of the Mobile Worker's armament.
UW-33 Union Mobile Worker (ユニオンモビルワーカー, Yunion Mobiru Wākā)
The latest armed mobile worker developed by a Jovian heavy industry manufacturer. It is a widely distributed model and many companies have acquired it for self defense purposes. Schematic-wise, it is propelled by three omnidirectional wheels and is armed with 12.7 mm guns mounted on a turret behind the cockpit alongside grenade launcher tubes on the sides. However, like their CGS/Tekkadan counterparts, they are vulnerable to Gjallarhorn's mobile workers, which can easily pierce their armor with a single shot. It was utilized by the Dort Workers' Union in their unsuccessful demonstration. Later, modified versions were given to Tekkadan by Teiwaz. They featured modified turrets with additional sensors, 60 mm auto-cannons, and a built-in co-axially mounted machine gun. Unfortunately, they do no feature Alaya Vijnana Systems for Tekkadan's pilots to interface with. After the Battle of Edmonton, they are last seen stationed on Earth with Tekkadan's Earth Branch and the Arbrau Defense Force. After the Arbrau-SAU border war, Tekkadan's Union Mobile Workers were recalled back to Mars.
NOA-0093 Isaribi (イサリビ)
An armored assault ship commandeered by Tekkadan. It was formerly known as the Will-o'-the-Wisp (ウィルオー・ザ・ウィスプ, Uiruō za Uisupu) under CGS ownership. It is armed with five anti-ship turrets, two anti-aircraft turrets, torpedo tubes, and two large tethered, rocket-propelled anchoring spikes mounted on the bow that are useful for tight space maneuvers and boarding actions. It also features a launch catapult and can carry at least three Mobile Suits alongside a large number of Mobile Workers. The Isabiri and similar assault ships are able to be directly piloted using the Alaya-Vijnana System and can even be controlled remotely through a long-distance wired connection. However, doing so can be stressful for the pilot, especially if more than one is being controlled at once. The ship's name under Tekkadan comes from a Japanese word referring to a fire used to lure fish at night.
NOA-0132 Hotarubi (ホタルビ)
Tekkadan's second ship. Unlike other armored assault ships with a similar chassis, the Hotarubi is a transport ship that has been armed and configured for transporting large numbers of Mobile Suits with the four anti-ship turrets replaced with eight large hangers on the sides of the ship. In addition, the back anti-ship turret and the tail is replaced with two large thrusters for speed, leaving the ship with two anti-aircraft turrets as defense weapons and no offensive weaponry besides torpedo tubes and two rocket-propelled anchoring spikes. Thus it must rely more on maneuvering and screens of Mobile Suits for safety and attack rather than raw fire power compared to the Isaribi. The vessel's name comes from a Japanese word referring to the light of a firefly. During Tekkadan's battle alongside McGillis against Arianrhod, the Hotarubi is crippled by Arianrhod's railguns and is then used as a sacrificial decoy to get Shino into position for his failed bid to take out Rustal's flagship.

=== Gjallarhorn ===
NK-17 Gjallarhorn Mobile Worker (ギャラルホルンモビルワーカー, Gyararuhorun Mobiru Wākā)
The standard issue mobile worker for Gjallarhorn's ground forces, they are armed with a chin-mounted machine gun, a quartet of smoke grenade launchers, and either a turret-mounted auto-cannon or a turret-mounted quartet of missile batteries while being propelled by three omni-directional wheels. Being significantly larger than the average Mobile Worker, it has a higher power output and so can carry larger and more powerful weapons along with thicker armor. Often sporting a red, teal or blue coloration and significantly larger than CGS' older mobile workers, they are often used for law enforcement or in low risk conflicts. While not as versatile or powerful as Gjallarhorn's mobile suits, they are significantly cheaper and more numerous. Furthermore, their weapons are more than a match against other mobile workers with their auto-cannons capable of piercing through with a single shot. In addition, unlike mobile suits whose Ahab Reactors would interfere with any urban center's power grid, Gjallarhorn's mobile workers are powered by hydrogen engines. Consequentially, they and mobile workers of other factions can operate in urban environments without worry.

=== Teiwaz/Turbines ===
JEE-M103 Kutan Type-III (クタン参型, Kutan San-gata)
A support vehicle used by Teiwaz to quickly deliver mobile suits or supplies over long distances. One is used to deliver Mikazuki and the refit Gundam Barbatos to Tekkadan from Saisei. The vehicle can be armed with two smooth-bore guns of the same model as the Gundam Barbatos' and one 60mm machine gun.
TIR-0009 Hammerhead (ハンマーヘッド, Hanmāheddo)
The Turbines' mothership, a large armored assault vessel with heavy armor. The ship's crew consists entirely of Naze Turbine himself and his sizable harem. In addition to five anti-ship turrets, two anti-aircraft turrets, and torpedo tubes, the Hammerhead's bow can be used as a weapon as its frontal hull armor is strong enough to ram other ships without damage. It was sacrificed along with Naze and manage destroy at least one of the Arianrod fleet's battleship after ramming Iok Kujan's main ship.
Saisei (歳星)
Teiwaz' primary base of operations, a massive planetary cruiser containing a small town in Jupiter's orbit. Its name comes from a Japanese word meaning "rebirth."

=== Dawn Horizon Corps ===
HD-21 HD Mobile Worker (モビルワーカー, Mobiru Wākā)
A medium sized mobile worker used by the Dawn Horizon Corps for ground operations, it is armed with a turret mounted cannon on top of the chassis alongside a chin-mounted machine gun to deal with lightly armored targets and infantry. Like other mobile workers, it is propelled by a hydrogen engine that powers three omni-directional wheels.

=== Strategic Alliance Union (SAU) ===
SAU-17 SAU Mobile Worker (モビルワーカー, Mobiru Wākā)
A mass produced close-range combat mobile worker used by the SAU Defense Force, it is armed with a large turret mounted mortar alongside a machine gun mounted on the side and a pair of four-tubed rocket launchers on the back of the turret. As with other mobile workers, it is propelled by a hydrogen engine and three omni-directional wheels.
