= Romi Park =

Japanese voice actress (born 1972)

- 朴 璐美
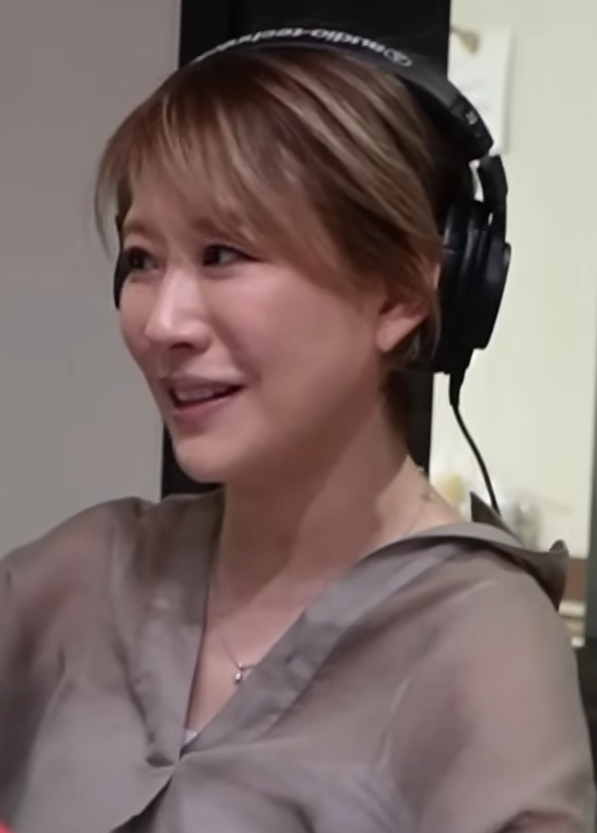
- Park in June 2025
- Born: January 22, 1972 (age 54); Edogawa, Tokyo, Japan
- Other name: Romi Paku
- Education: Toho Gakuen College of Drama and Music
- Occupations: Actress; voice actress; singer
- Years active: 1993–present
- Agent: LAL
- Notable work: Turn A Gundam as Loran Cehack; Fullmetal Alchemist as Edward Elric; Bleach as Tōshirō Hitsugaya; Nana as Nana Osaki; Digimon Adventure 02 as Ken Ichijouji; Naruto as Temari; BloodRayne as Agent BloodRayne; Yes! PreCure 5 GoGo as Syrup; Kill La Kill as Ragyo Kiryuin; Attack on Titan as Zoë Hange; Pokémon: Zoroark: Master of Illusions as Zoroark; Beyblade Burst as Lui Shirasagijo; Street Fighter V as Kolin
- Spouse: Kazuhiro Yamaji (m. 2020)

Korean name
- Hangul: 박로미
- Hanja: 朴璐美
- RR: Bak Romi
- MR: Pak Romi
- Website: www.romi-park.com

Romi Park (朴 璐美, Paku Romi; born January 22, 1972) (Note: Due to technical issues, Park's name is often written as 朴ロ美 due to the Hyōgaiji status of 璐 (which is the kan'on reading of the kanji). She has also been referred by 朴路美 and 朴王路美.) is a Japanese actress and singer. She graduated from the Toho Gakuen College of Drama and Music and studied Korean at the Korean Language Institute (한국어학당) in Yonsei University. She won numerous awards, including the Best Actress Award at the 1st Seiyu Awards.

Park is known for her roles as tough, calm and mature preteen or teenage boys who are often called prodigies in their fictional universes (for example, Tao Ren, Ken Ichijouji, Tōshirō Hitsugaya, Edward Elric, Kosuke Ueki and Natsume Hyūga). Her female roles also fit the "tough lady/punk girl" archetype (Temari, Nana Osaki and Teresa of the Faint Smile).

== Personal life ==
Park was born in Edogawa, Tokyo. She attended and graduated from Wayo Konodai Girls' High School (和洋国府台女子高等学校) in 1990. She entered the theater department at Toho Gakuen College of Drama and Music where she graduated in 1992. She later studied at the Korean language school in Yonsei University. In 1993, she joined the Institute for Drama, and two years later she was promoted as a member of the theater group Yen in 1995.

Park is a third-generation Zainichi Korean and speaks Korean fluently. Her father is a second-generation Korean resident in Japan, and her mother is Korean. She became a fully naturalized Japanese citizen on December 25, 2015.

On January 22, 2020, which was the same day as her 48th birthday, she announced on her official website and Twitter that she married fellow voice actor Kazuhiro Yamaji.

== Career ==
In 1998, she made her voice acting debut as Kanan Gimms in the anime series Brain Powerd.

== Additional performances ==
In 2006, Park sang and released a CD. In 2016, Park was scheduled to appear in the Box Contents 2016 theater, but she did not participate as a result of poor physical condition. On November 15, 2017, she left the Yen theater group she had been with for 22 years, and established the entertainment and voice actor office LAL. In August 2018, she read the Your Name audiobook. In 2019, she made her first musical appearance as Madame Thenardier in Les Misérables.

== Accolades ==
2003: Voice Actor award, 26th Anime Grand Prix.

2004: Voice Actor Award, Tokyo International Anime Fair 2004.

2006: Best Actress Award for Nana as Nana Osaki, 1st Seiyu Awards.

2013: starred in a live-action film Akaboshi, which was nominated for a viewpoint at the 25th Tokyo International Film Festival.

== Filmography ==
=== Anime ===
Voice performances in anime
| Year | Title | Role | Notes | Source |
|---|---|---|---|---|
| 1997 | Kindaichi Case Files | Tomoko Ninomiya | | |
| 1998 | Brain Powerd | Kanan Gimms | | |
| 1999 | Turn A Gundam | Loran Cehack | | |
| 1999 | One Piece | Harry, Shyarly | | |
| 2000–2002 | Ojamajo Doremi series | Majo Ran, Akira Ryukyo, Baba | Starting from # | |
| 2000 | Digimon Adventure 02 | Ken Ichijouji, others | | |
| 2001 | Shingu: Secret of the Stellar Wars | Nayuta Moriyama | | |
| 2001 | Shaman King | Tao Ren | | |
| 2001 | Cyborg 009: The Cyborg Soldier | Mii | | |
| 2001 | Zaion: I Wish You Were Here | Tao | | |
| 2002 | RahXephon | Makoto Isshiki (young) | | |
| 2002 | Tenchi Muyo! GXP | Kyo Komachi | | |
| 2002 | Digimon Frontier | Mole the Trailmon | | |
| 2002 | Dragon Drive | Reiji Ozora | | |
| 2002 | Lupin III: Episode 0: First Contact | Eleanor | | |
| 2002 | Princess Tutu | Will Maiden | | |
| 2002 | Monkey Typhoon | Raritomu | | |
| 2002 | GetBackers | Juubei (young) | | |
| 2002 | Galaxy Angel A | Crane | | |
| 2002 | Pecola | Rabi, Bernard's wife | | |
| 2002 | Naruto | Temari | | |
| 2003–2004 | New Fist of the North Star | Vista | | |
| 2003 | Ashita no Nadja | Alan | | |
| 2003 | Air Master | Maki Aikawa | | |
| 2003 | The Mythical Detective Loki Ragnarok | Heimdall (Kazumi Higashiyama) | | |
| 2003 | Ninja Scroll: The Series | Tsubute | | |
| 2003 | Yami to Bōshi to Hon no Tabibito | Gargantua (boy) | | |
| 2003–2004 | Fullmetal Alchemist | Edward Elric | | |
| 2003 | Gilgamesh | Azusa Madoka | | |
| 2003 | Aquarian Age the Movie | Stella Blavatsky | OVA | |
| 2003 | Stellvia | Najima Gable, Masatao Katase | | |
| 2004 | SD Gundam Force | Shute | | |
| 2004 | Hamtaro series | Radar | | |
| 2004–2005 | Monster | Helene | | |
| 2004 | Samurai 7 | Okamoto Katsushiro | | |
| 2004 | Kurau: Phantom Memory | Clerk | | |
| 2004 | New Getter Robo | Minamoto no Yorimitsu 源頼光 | OVA eps. 3-4 | |
| 2004 | Haruka: Beyond the Stream of Time: A Tale of the Eight Guardians | Yorihisa (young) | | |
| 2004 | Black Jack | Yukio | | |
| 2004 | Gakuen Alice | Natsume Hyūga | | |
| 2005 | Bleach | Tōshirō Hitsugaya | | |
| 2005 | Genesis of Aquarion | Kurt and Chloe Klick | | |
| 2005–2005 | The Law of Ueki | Kosuke Ueki | | |
| 2005 | He Is My Master | Seiichirou Nakabayashi | | |
| 2005 | Jing: King of Bandits: Seventh Heaven | Mint | OVA | |
| 2005 | Blood+ | Kurara | | |
| 2006 | Glass Fleet | Cleo (young) | | |
| 2006 | Nana | Nana Osaki | | |
| 2006 | Princess Princess | Yuujirou Shihoudani | | |
| 2006 | Zegapain | Mao Lu-Shen | | |
| 2006 | Ah! My Goddess: Flights of Fancy | Sentaro Kawanishi | | |
| 2006 | Jyu-Oh-Sei | Karim | | |
| 2006 | Innocent Venus | Hijin | | |
| 2007–2010 | Major | Shimizu Taiga | Starting from 3rd TV series | |
| 2007 | GR: Giant Robo | Alex McKenzie | | |
| 2007 | Naruto: Shippuden | Temari | | |
| 2007 | Claymore | Teresa | | |
| 2007 | Oh! Edo Rocket | Oise | | |
| 2007–2009 | Blue Dragon series | Zola | | |
| 2007 | Dennō Coil | Ken'ichi Harakawa | | |
| 2007 | Devil May Cry | Elena Huston | | |
| 2007 | Fantastic Detective Labyrinth | Kōta Koga | | |
| 2007 | Neuro: Supernatural Detective | Sai Kaitou | | |
| 2007–2008 | Mobile Suit Gundam 00 series | Regene Regetta | | |
| 2007 | MapleStory | Gill | | |
| 2007 | Shion no Ō | Ayumi Saitō | | |
| 2007 | Tweeny Witches: The Adventures | Gaana | | |
| 2008 | Yes! PreCure 5 GoGo | Syrup / Shiro Amai | | |
| 2008 | Amatsuki | Kuchiha | | |
| 2008 | Itazura na Kiss | Yuuki Irie | | |
| 2008 | Kaiba | Popo | | |
| 2008 | Ultraviolet: Code 044 | 044 | | |
| 2008–2010 | Sekirei series | Karasuba | | |
| 2008–2014 | Black Butler series | Madam Red | | |
| 2008 | Clannad ~After Story~ | Katsuki Shima | | |
| 2008 | Kurozuka | Kuromitsu | | |
| 2009 | White Album | Yayoi Shinozuka | | |
| 2009 | Rideback | Tamayo Kataoka | | |
| 2009–2014 | Sengoku Basara | Kenshin Uesugi | | |
| 2009 | Higepiyo | Higepiyo | | |
| 2009–2010 | Fullmetal Alchemist: Brotherhood | Edward Elric | | |
| 2009 | 07-Ghost | Ouida | | |
| 2009 | Sōten Kōro | Diao Chan 貂蝉 | | |
| 2009 | Spice and Wolf II | Eve | | |
| 2009 | Hetalia: Axis Powers | Switzerland | Starting with phase 2 | |
| 2009 | Tatakau Shisho: The Book of Bantorra | Hamyuts Meseta | | |
| 2009 | To | Maria | OVA | |
| 2009 | Needless | Adam Blade (young) | | |
| 2009 | Aoi Bungaku | Tsuneko | | |
| 2009 | Kūchū Buranko | Young Irabu Ichirou | | |
| 2010 | Lupin III: The Last Job | Maya | | |
| 2010 | Beyblade: Metal Masters | Damian Hart | | |
| 2010 | Rainbow: Nisha Rokubō no Shichinin | Noboru Maeda | | |
| 2010 | Stitch! | Delia | | |
| 2010 | Digimon Xros Wars | Ken Ichijouji | | |
| 2011 | Marvel Anime: Wolverine | Yukio | | |
| 2011 | Beelzebub | Fabas | | |
| 2011 | Toriko | Komatsu | | |
| 2011 | Tono to Issho: Gantai no Yabō | Aya-Gozen 仙桃院 | | |
| 2011 | Jewelpet Sunshine | Nyangelina ニャンジェリーナ | | |
| 2011 | Deadman Wonderland | Ganta Igarashi | | |
| 2011 | Mawaru Penguindrum | Tsubasa Yuki | | |
| 2011–2012 | Persona 4: The Animation | Naoto Shirogane | Also Golden in 2014 | |
| 2011 | Black Jack Final | L | OVA Ep. 12 "Beautiful Avengers" | |
| 2012 | Daily Lives of High School Boys | Mule shooter ラバシューター | | |
| 2012 | Zetman | Young Jin Kanzaki | | |
| 2012 | Hunter × Hunter | Pakunoda | 2011 TV Series | |
| 2012 | Akaboshi | Single mom | | |
| 2012 | Rock Lee & His Ninja Pals | Temari | | |
| 2012 | Kuromajo-san ga Toru!! | Gyubid | | |
| 2012 | Arashi no Yoru ni: Himitsu no Tomodachi | Young Gabu | | |
| 2012 | Medaka Box series | Myouri Unzen | | |
| 2012 | Lupin III: Record of Observations of the East – Another Page | Hiromi | | |
| 2013 | Red Data Girl | Yukariko Suzuhara | | |
| 2013–2023 | Attack on Titan | Zoë Hange | | |
| 2013 | Kill la Kill | Ragyo Kiryuin | | |
| 2014 | Terra Formars | Elena Perepelkina | | |
| 2014 | Garo: Honō no Kokuin | Ema Guzman | | |
| 2014 | Gundam Build Fighters Try | Lucas Nemesis | | |
| 2015 | Snow White with the Red Hair | Atri | | |
| 2015 | Venus Project: Climax | Asuka Kogami | | |
| 2015 | Attack on Titan: Junior High | Zoe Hange | | |
| 2015 | Garo: Guren no Tsuki | Seimei | | |
| 2016 | Nyanbo! | Tora | | |
| 2016 | Danganronpa 3: The End of Kibōgamine Gakuen | Akane Owari | Side: Despair | |
| 2016–2022 | Beyblade Burst series | Lui Shirasagijo | Seasons 1-3, 5-6 | |
| 2017 | Boruto: Naruto Next Generations | Temari | | |
| 2017 | Granblue Fantasy The Animation | Black Knight (Apollonia Vaar) | Ep. 5 - | |
| 2017 | Land of the Lustrous | Padparadscha | | |
| 2018 | Junji Ito Collection | Setsuko/Riruko | | |
| 2018 | Katana Maidens ~ Toji No Miko | Sana Maniwa | | |
| 2018 | Fate/Extra Last Encore | Leonardo Bistario Harwey | | |
| 2018 | Cutie Honey Universe | Naoko Sukeban | | |
| 2018 | Dragon Pilot: Hisone and Masotan | Sada Hinomoto | | |
| 2018 | Mecha-ude | Kagami Jun | | |
| 2018–2021 | Radiant | Alma | | |
| 2019 | Kakegurui xx | Batsubami Rei | | |
| 2020 | The God of High School | Kim Ungnyeo | Ep. 13 | |
| 2021 | Vlad Love | Chihiro Chihmatsuri | | |
| 2021 | Shaman King (2021) | Tao Ren | | |
| 2021 | Getter Robo Arc | Queen Meldousa | | |
| 2021 | The Idaten Deities Know Only Peace | Hayato | | |
| 2021 | Love Live! Superstar!! | Director | | |
| 2022 | Platinum End | Ogaro | | |
| 2022 | Shikimori's Not Just a Cutie | Shikimori's mother | | |
| 2022 | Bleach: Thousand-Year Blood War | Tōshirō Hitsugaya | | |
| 2023 | Junji Ito Maniac: Japanese Tales of the Macabre | Kiko Hikizuri | | |
| 2023–2025 | My Hero Academia | Star and Stripe | Seasons 6-8 | |
| 2023 | The Family Circumstances of the Irregular Witch | Lyra | | |
| 2023 | Migi & Dali | Reiko Ichijō | | |
| 2023 | Pluto | Helena | ONA | |
| 2024 | Ishura | Taren the Punished | | |
| 2024 | Shaman King: Flowers | Tao Men | | |
| 2024 | Mission: Yozakura Family | Rin Fudō | | |
| 2024 | Delico's Nursery | Clara | | |
| 2024 | Mecha-Ude | Kagami | | |
| 2025 | Zenshu | Justice | | |
| 2025 | Miru: Paths to My Future | Izumif | | |
| 2026 | The World Is Dancing | Zōjirō | | |
| | Macross Zero | Katie | | |
| | Case Closed | Sayori Kaihara | Ep. 296 | |
| | Pokémon | Jirou | | |

=== Theatre ===
Theatre role
| Year | Title | Role | Notes | Source |
|---|---|---|---|---|
| 2019 | Les Miserables (musical) | Madame Thenardier | | |
| 2024 | Spirited Away | Yubaba/Zeniba | Tokyo Imperial Theatre/London Coliseum | Double starring with Mari Natsuki |

=== Films ===
Voice performances in films
| Year | Title | Role | Notes | Source |
|---|---|---|---|---|
| 2004 | Blade of the Phantom Master | Mari | | |
| 2005 | Fullmetal Alchemist the Movie: Conqueror of Shamballa | Edward Elric | | |
| 2006 | Bleach: Memories of Nobody | Tōshirō Hitsugaya | | |
| 2007 | Naruto Shippuden the Movie | Temari | | |
| 2007 | Vexille | Takashi | | |
| 2007 | Yes! PreCure 5 The Movie: Great Miraculous Adventure in the Mirror Kingdom! | Shadow | | |
| 2007 | Bleach: The DiamondDust Rebellion | Tōshirō Hitsugaya | | |
| 2008 | Highlander: The Search for Vengeance | Dahlia | First released as English dub in 2007 | |
| 2008 | Fist of the North Star: The Legends of the True Savior: Zero: Legend of Kenshiro | Dan | | |
| 2008 | Yes PreCure 5 GoGo! The Movie: Happy Birthday in the Land of Sweets | Syrup | | |
| 2008 | Bleach: Fade to Black | Tōshirō Hitsugaya | | |
| 2009 | Hells | Linne's mother | | |
| 2009 | Pretty Cure All Stars DX: Everyone's Friends☆the Collection of Miracles! | Syrup | | |
| 2009 | Naruto Shippuden the Movie: The Will of Fire | Temari | | |
| 2009 | Yona Yona Penguin | Rascals 悪ガキ | | |
| 2010 | Pretty Cure All Stars DX2: Light of Hope☆Protect the Rainbow Jewel! | Syrup | | |
| 2010 | Pokémon: Zoroark: Master of Illusions | Zoroark | | |
| 2010 | Bleach: Hell Verse | Tōshirō Hitsugaya | | |
| 2011 | Pretty Cure All Stars DX3: Deliver the Future! The Rainbow-Colored Flower That Connects the World | Syrup/Shadow | | |
| 2011 | Detective Conan: Quarter of Silence | Mizuki Tono 遠野みずき | | |
| 2011 | Buddha: The Great Departure | Tatta's sister | | |
| 2011 | Sengoku Basara: The Last Party | Kenshin Uesugi | | |
| 2011 | Fullmetal Alchemist: The Sacred Star of Milos | Edward Elric | | |
| 2011 | Kami Voice: The Voice Makes a Miracle | Sayuri Takeda 竹田さゆり | live-action | |
| 2013 | Hunter × Hunter: Phantom Rouge | Pakunoda | | |
| 2013 | Eevee & Friends | Gochiruzeru ゴチルゼル | | |
| 2013 | Toriko the Movie: Bishokushin's Special Menu | Komatsu | | |
| 2015 | Pretty Cure All Stars: Spring Carnival♪ | Syrup | | |
| 2016 | Garo: Divine Flame | Ema Guzman | | |
| 2022 | Doraemon: Nobita's Little Star Wars 2021 | Papi | | |
| 2022 | Break of Dawn | February Dawn | | |
| 2024 | Zegapain STA | Mao Lu-Shen | | |
| 2025 | Batman Ninja vs. Yakuza League | Wonder Woman | | |
| 2025 | Whoever Steals This Book | Tamaki Mikura | | |

=== Drama CDs ===
Voice performances in drama CDs and audio recordings
| Title | Role | Notes | Source |
|---|---|---|---|
| Fullmetal Alchemist | Edward Elric | | |
| Bleach | Tōshirō Hitsugaya | CD（S） | |
| Fullmetal Alchemist: Brotherhood | Edward Elric | | |
| Quiet Don | Rie 理江 | | |
| Fate/extra | Leonardo Bisutario-Hawei レオナルド・ビスタリオ・ハーウェイ | | |
| Shining Force EXA | | | |
| White Album | | | |
| Venus Project Climax | Yayoi Shinozuka | | |

=== Video games ===
Voice performances in video games
| Year | Title | Role | Notes | Source |
|---|---|---|---|---|
| 2002 | Grandia Xtreme | Kwan Lee クァン・リー | PS1/PS2 | |
| 2002 | GioGio's Bizarre Adventure | Giorno Giovanna | PS2 | |
| 2003–2022 | Fullmetal Alchemist games | Edward Elric | | |
| 2004 | Stellvia | Najima Gable | PS1/PS2 | |
| 2004 | Shaman King: hold out spirits | Tao Len, Senju | PS1/PS2 | |
| 2004 | SD Gundam Force Decisive Battle! Dimension pirate de Sekar! ! | Shute | PS1/PS2 | |
| 2004 | Tales of Rebirth | Shaorun シャオルーン | PS1/PS2 | |
| 2005 | Train Man | Train Man | | |
| 2005 | Hanjuku Hero 4: 7-Jin no Hanjuku Hero | Lethocerus deyrollei Alchemist (Ed) タガメの錬金術師（エド） | PS1/PS2 | |
| 2005 | Sakura Wars: So Long, My Love | Kokuryu-hime | PS1/PS2 | |
| 2005–2015 | Sengoku Basara games | Kenshin Uesugi | PS1/PS2 | |
| 2005 | Rhapsodia | Cyrillic キリル | PS1/PS2 | |
| 2005 | Critical Velocity | Diana | PS2 | |
| 2005 | Mobile Suit Gundam SEED Union VSZAFT | Nicol Amarfi | PS1/PS2 | |
| 2006 | Clannad | Katsuki Shima | PS1/PS2 | |
| 2006 | Samurai 7 | Okamoto Katsushirou 岡本カツシロウ | PS1/PS2 | |
| 2006 | Gakuen Alice ~ glitter ★ memory Kiss ~ | Natsume Hyūga | PS1/PS2 | |
| 2006 | Brave Story: New Traveler | Mitsuru Ashikawa | PS1/PS2 | |
| 2006–2007 | Nana games | Nana Osaki | PSP | |
| 2006 | Rune Factory: A Fantasy Harvest Moon | Raguna | DS | |
| 2006 | Phantasy Star Universe | Tonnio Rhima | PS1/PS2 | |
| 2006 | Princess Princess | Yuujirou Shihoudani | PS1/PS2 | |
| 2007 | Shining Force EXA | Toma | PS1/PS2 | |
| 2007 | Another Century's Episode 3: The Final | Loran Cehack | PS1/PS2 | |
| 2007 | Castle of Shikigami III | Gold sawn 金美姫 | Wii | |
| 2008 | Shion no Ō: The Flowers of Hard Blood. | Ayumi Saitō | DS | |
| 2008 | Persona 4 | Naoto Shirogane | PS2; Also Golden | |
| 2008–2011 | Phantasy Star Portable games | Tonio Lima トニオ・リマ | Also Portable 2 and Infinity | |
| 2008 | Majin Tantei Nougami Neuro: Battle Da Yo! Hannin Shūgō | Sai Kaitou | PS1/PS2 | |
| 2008 | Rune Factory Frontier | Raguna | Wii | |
| 2008 | Suikoden Tierkreis | Chrodechild | DS | |
| 2008 | Dissidia: Final Fantasy | Zidane Tribal | PSP | |
| 2009 | Wind across the wolf and spice sea | Abe エーブ | DS | |
| 2010–2013 | Hetalia: Axis Powers games | Switzerland | | |
| 2010 | Metal Gear Solid: Peace Walker | Amanda Valenciano Libre | PSP | |
| 2010 | White Album: Spelled Winter Memories | Yayoi Shinozuka 篠塚弥生 | PS3 | |
| 2010 | Fate/Extra | Leonardo Bisutario-Hawei レオナルド・ビスタリオ・ハーウェイ | PSP | |
| 2011 | Another Century's Episode Portable | Loran Cehack | PSP | |
| 2011 | Dissidia 012 Final Fantasy | Zidane Tribal | PSP | |
| 2011–2012 | Toriko: Gourmet Survival! | Komatsu | PSP | |
| 2012 | Danganronpa 2: Goodbye Despair | Akane Owari 終里赤音 | PSP | |
| 2012 | Mobile Suit Gundam AGE | Shanalua Mallen | PSP | |
| 2012 | Project X Zone | Toma | 3DS; Toma from Shining Force EXA | |
| 2012 | Yakuza 5 | Mirei Paku | PS3 | |
| 2013 | Metal Gear Rising: Revengeance | Mistral | PS3; Japanese dub | |
| 2013 | Fate/Extra CCC | Leo レオ | PSP | |
| 2013 | BioShock Infinite | Daisy Fitzroy | Japanese dub | |
| 2013 | The Last of Us | Marlene | PS3; Japanese dub | |
| 2013 | JoJo's Bizarre Adventure: All-Star Battle | Koichi Hirose | PS3 | |
| 2013 | Danganronpa 1 2 Reload | Akane Owari 終里赤音 | Other | |
| 2014 | Ryū ga Gotoku Ishin! | Otose | | |
| 2014 | Persona Q: Shadow of the Labyrinth | Naoto Shirogane | 3DS | |
| 2014 | Persona 4 Arena Ultimax | Naoto Shirogane | PS3 | |
| 2014–2016 | Naruto games | Temari | | |
| 2015 | Persona 4: Dancing All Night | Naoto Shirogane | | |
| 2015 | JoJo's Bizarre Adventure: Eyes of Heaven | Koichi Hirose | | |
| 2016 | Street Fighter V | Kolin | PC, PS4 | |
| 2016 | For Honor | Nobushi | PC, PS4, Xbox One | |
| 2016 | Attack on Titan | Zoë Hange | PS4, PC, Xbox One | |
| 2016 | Overwatch | Pharah | PC, PS4, Xbox One | Japanese dub |
| 2017 | Dragon Quest Rivals | Debora Briscoletti | Android/IOS, PC, Switch | |
| 2018 | Attack on Titan 2 | Zoë Hange | PS4, Switch, Xbox One | |
| 2018 | BlazBlue: Cross Tag Battle | Naoto Shirogane | PC, PS4, Switch | |
| 2020 | Cyberpunk 2077 | Rogue Amendiares | PC, Stadia, PS4, PS5, Xbox One, Xbox Series X/S | Japanese dub |
| 2020 | Guardian Tales (Global server) | Guardian (Female) | Android, iOS | Japanese dub |
| 2021 | Lord of Heroes | Helga Schmitt | Android, iOS | |
| 2021 | Arena of Valor | Tōshirō Hitsugaya (skin) | Android, iOS | |
| 2021 | Cookie Run: Kingdom | Dark Enchantress Cookie | Android, iOS | |
| 2022 | A Certain Magical Index: Imaginary Fest | Edward Elric | Android, iOS; Edward Elric from Fullmetal Alchemist | |
| 2025 | Like a Dragon: Pirate Yakuza in Hawaii | Queen Michele | PC, PS4, PS5, Xbox One, Xbox Series X/S | |
| 2025 | Bleach: Rebirth of Souls | Tōshirō Hitsugaya | PC, PS4, PS5, Xbox Series X/S | |
| 2025 | Ghost of Yōtei | Oyuki | PS5 | Japanese dub |
| 2026 | Dissidia Duellum Final Fantasy | Zidane Tribal | Android, iOS | |
| 2027 | Danganronpa 2x2 | Akane Owari | Nintendo Switch, Nintendo Switch 2, PlayStation 5, Windows, Xbox Series X/S | |

=== Tokusatsu ===
Voice performances in tokusatsu
| Year | Title | Role | Notes | Source |
|---|---|---|---|---|
| 2009 | Samurai Sentai Shinkenger | Usuyuki (Actor)/Dayu Usukawa (Voice) | Eps. 1 – 16, 18 – 20, 22 – 27, 32 – 35, 39 – 40, 42 – 48 | |
| 2019 | Kishiryu Sentai Ryusoulger | Pricious, Eras | Eps. 34 – 41, 43 – 48 | |
| 2021 | Kamen Rider Saber | Neko Megid | Eps. 30-31 | |
| 2022 | Avataro Sentai Donbrothers | Ryuko No Geki (Weapon Voice) | Eps. 15- | |

=== Live-action ===
| Year | Title | Role | Notes | Source |
|---|---|---|---|---|
| 2022 | Anime Supremacy! | Narrator | | |

=== Dubbing roles ===
==== Live action ====
| Title | Role | Voice dub for | Notes | Source |
|---|---|---|---|---|
| Resident Evil | Rain Ocampo | Michelle Rodriguez | | |
| S.W.A.T. | Officer Chris Sanchez | Michelle Rodriguez | | |
| Machete | Luz | Michelle Rodriguez | | |
| Battle: Los Angeles | Technical Sergeant Elena Santos | Michelle Rodriguez | | |
| Resident Evil: Retribution | Rain Ocampo | Michelle Rodriguez | | |
| Machete Kills | Luz | Michelle Rodriguez | | |
| The Assignment | Frank Kitchen | Michelle Rodriguez | | |
| Crisis | Supervisor Garrett | Michelle Rodriguez | | |
| The Gift | Valerie Barksdale | Hilary Swank | | |
| Insomnia | Officer Ellie Burr | Hilary Swank | 2006 TV Tokyo edition | |
| The Core | Major Rebecca "Beck" Childs | Hilary Swank | 2005 TV Asahi edition | |
| Million Dollar Baby | Maggie Fitzgerald | Hilary Swank | 2006 TV Tokyo edition | |
| Freedom Writers | Erin Gruwell | Hilary Swank | | |
| Amelia | Amelia Earhart | Hilary Swank | | |
| Conviction | Betty Anne Waters | Hilary Swank | | |
| The Monitor | Anna | Noomi Rapace | | |
| Unlocked | Alice Racine | Noomi Rapace | | |
| What Happened to Monday | The Settman Siblings / Karen Settman | Noomi Rapace | | |
| Stockholm | Bianca Lind | Noomi Rapace | | |
| Close | Sam Carlson | Noomi Rapace | | |
| Lamb | María | Noomi Rapace | | |
| Guardians of the Galaxy | Gamora | Zoe Saldaña | | |
| Guardians of the Galaxy Vol. 2 | Gamora | Zoe Saldaña | | |
| Avengers: Infinity War | Gamora | Zoe Saldaña | | |
| Avengers: Endgame | Gamora | Zoe Saldaña | | |
| Guardians of the Galaxy Vol. 3 | Gamora | Zoe Saldaña | | |
| Special Ops: Lioness | Joe | Zoe Saldaña | | |
| Shanghai Noon | Princess Pei-Pei | Lucy Liu | TV Asahi edition | |
| Charlie's Angels | Alex Munday | Lucy Liu | TV Asahi edition | |
| Ballistic: Ecks vs. Sever | Agent Sever | Lucy Liu | TV Asahi edition | |
| Charlie's Angels: Full Throttle | Alex Munday | Lucy Liu | TV Asahi edition | |
| Shazam! Fury of the Gods | Kalypso | Lucy Liu | | |
| Red One | Zoe Harlow | Lucy Liu | | |
| Star Trek II: The Wrath of Khan | Uhura | Nichelle Nichols | Special Collector's Edition DVD | |
| Star Trek III: The Search for Spock | Uhura | Nichelle Nichols | Special Collector's Edition DVD | |
| Star Trek IV: The Voyage Home | Uhura | Nichelle Nichols | Special Collector's Edition DVD | |
| Star Trek V: The Final Frontier | Uhura | Nichelle Nichols | Special Collector's Edition DVD | |
| Star Trek VI: The Undiscovered Country | Uhura | Nichelle Nichols | Special Collector's Edition DVD | |
| The Faculty | Stokely "Stokes" Mitchell | Clea DuVall | 2002 Fuji TV edition | |
| The Astronaut's Wife | Nan | Clea DuVall | 2002 TV Asahi edition | |
| Ghosts of Mars | Bashira Kincaid | Clea DuVall | | |
| Identity | Ginny Isiana | Clea DuVall | 2007 TV Tokyo edition | |
| Exit Wounds | Trish | Eva Mendes | | |
| 2 Fast 2 Furious | Monica Fuentes | Eva Mendes | | |
| Once Upon a Time in Mexico | Ajedrez Barillo | Eva Mendes | | |
| The Place Beyond the Pines | Romina Gutierrez | Eva Mendes | | |
| Alice in Wonderland | Iracebeth the Red Queen | Helena Bonham Carter | | |
| The Lone Ranger | Red Harrington | Helena Bonham Carter | | |
| Cinderella | The Fairy Godmother | Helena Bonham Carter | | |
| Alice Through the Looking Glass | Iracebeth the Red Queen | Helena Bonham Carter | | |
| 300: Rise of an Empire | Artemisia | Eva Green | | |
| Sin City: A Dame to Kill For | Ava Lord | Eva Green | | |
| Miss Peregrine's Home for Peculiar Children | Miss Alma LeFay Peregrine | Eva Green | | |
| In Her Shoes | Maggie Feller | Cameron Diaz | | |
| The Holiday | Amanda Woods | Cameron Diaz | | |
| My Sister's Keeper | Sara Fitzgerald | Cameron Diaz | | |
| The Matrix Reloaded | Zee | Nona Gaye | | |
| The Matrix Revolutions | Zee | Nona Gaye | | |
| XXX: State of the Union | Lola Jackson | Nona Gaye | 2009 TV Asahi edition | |
| Abraham Lincoln: Vampire Hunter | Vadoma | Erin Wasson | | |
| Accident | The Woman | Michelle Ye | | |
| Aliens | PFC. Jeanette Vasquez | Jenette Goldstein | Ultimate Edition DVD | |
| American Horror Story: Hotel | Elizabeth Johnson / The Countess | Lady Gaga | | |
| Anacondas: The Hunt for the Blood Orchid | Gail Stern | Salli Richardson | | |
| The Art of War III: Retribution | Sun Yi | Sung-Hi Lee | | |
| Back to the Future Part III | Clara Clayton | Mary Steenburgen | 2025 NTV edition | |
| Bandidas | Sara Sandoval | Salma Hayek | | |
| Barbie | Weird Barbie | Kate McKinnon | | |
| Better Call Saul | Kim Wexler | Rhea Seehorn | | |
| Big Trouble | Jenny Herk | Zooey Deschanel | | |
| The Black Dahlia | Sheryl Saddon | Rose McGowan | | |
| Bleeding Steel | Woman in Black | Tess Haubrich | | |
| The Boondock Saints II: All Saints Day | Special Agent Eunice Bloom | Julie Benz | | |
| The Cell | Julia Hickson | Tara Subkoff | | |
| The Chronicles of Narnia: The Voyage of the Dawn Treader | Eustace Scrubb | Will Poulter | | |
| City by the Sea | Gina | Eliza Dushku | | |
| Cold Mountain | Ruby Thewes | Renée Zellweger | 2007 TV Tokyo edition | |
| Collateral | Annie Farrell | Jada Pinkett Smith | | |
| Concussion | Prema Mutiso | Gugu Mbatha-Raw | | |
| Cowboy Bebop | Shin | Ann Truong | | |
| Cuban Fury | Julia | Rashida Jones | | |
| Cube 2: Hypercube | Sasha | Grace Lynn Kung | | |
| D-Tox | Mary | Dina Meyer | | |
| The Dark Knight | Detective Anna Ramirez | Monique Gabriela Curnen | DVD/Blu-Ray edition | |
| Deadpool & Wolverine | Lady Deadpool | Blake Lively | | |
| The Detonator | Nadia Cominski | Silvia Colloca | | |
| Devious Maids | Rosie Falta-Westmore | Dania Ramirez | | |
| Django Unchained | Broomhilda von Shaft | Kerry Washington | | |
| Doctor Who | Thirteenth Doctor | Jodie Whittaker | Hulu Japan edition | |
| A Dog's Journey | Gloria Mitchell | Betty Gilpin | | |
| Dolittle | Dab Dab the Duck | Octavia Spencer | | |
| Down with Love | Barbara Novak | Renée Zellweger | | |
| The Duchess | Lady Elizabeth "Bess" Foster | Hayley Atwell | | |
| The Edge of Heaven | Ayten | Nurgül Yeşilçay | | |
| Enemy of the State | Carla Dean | Regina King | 2003 Fuji TV edition | |
| Entrapment | Virginia "Gin" Baker | Catherine Zeta-Jones | 2007 TV Tokyo edition | |
| ER | Meg Corwin | Martha Plimpton | | |
| ER | Makemba "Kem" Likasu | Thandiwe Newton | | |
| Eyes Wide Shut | Waitress | | | |
| Final Destination | Clear Rivers | Ali Larter | | |
| Final Destination 2 | Clear Rivers | Ali Larter | | |
| Fosse/Verdon | Gwen Verdon | Michelle Williams | | |
| Garm Wars: The Last Druid | Khara | Mélanie St-Pierre | | |
| Geostorm | Dana | Zazie Beetz | | |
| Ghostbusters | Dr. Jillian Holtzmann | Kate McKinnon | | |
| Ghostbusters: Afterlife | Callie Spengler | Carrie Coon | | |
| Ghostbusters: Frozen Empire | Callie Spengler | Carrie Coon | | |
| Gossip Girl | Vanessa Abrams | Jessica Szohr | | |
| Gossip Girl | Rachel Zoe | | | |
| The Great Gatsby | Myrtle Wilson | Karen Black | DVD edition | |
| Grey's Anatomy | Dr. Amelia Shepherd | Caterina Scorsone | | |
| Head in the Clouds | Mia | Penélope Cruz | | |
| A Hidden Life | Franziska Jägerstätter | Valerie Pachner | | |
| Holy Smoke! | Yvonne | Sophie Lee | | |
| The Huntsman: Winter's War | Sara | Jessica Chastain | | |
| I Care a Lot | Marla Grayson | Rosamund Pike | | |
| I Feel Pretty | Jane | Busy Philipps | | |
| Infernal Affairs | Mary | Sammi Cheng | | |
| Infernal Affairs III | Mary | Sammi Cheng | | |
| Jexi | Denice | Wanda Sykes | | |
| The Jungle Book | Kaa | Scarlett Johansson | | |
| Just Married | Sarah McNerney | Brittany Murphy | | |
| Killing Me Softly | Joanna | Yasmin Bannerman | | |
| The Last of Us | Marlene | Merle Dandridge | | |
| Legally Blonde | Serena McGuire | Alanna Ubach | | |
| Le Havre | Idrissa | Blondin Miguel | | |
| Live by Night | Emma Gould | Sienna Miller | | |
| Marry Me | Kat Valdez | Jennifer Lopez | | |
| Mars | Hana Seung / Joon Seung | Jihae | | |
| Max Payne | Mona Sax | Mila Kunis | | |
| Meg 2: The Trench | Hillary Driscoll | Sienna Guillory | | |
| Men in Black: International | Riza Stavros | Rebecca Ferguson | | |
| The Messenger: The Story of Joan of Arc | Joan of Arc | Milla Jovovich | | |
| Mickey 17 | Ylfa Marshall | Toni Collette | | |
| A Minecraft Movie | Malgosha | Rachel House | | |
| Mortal Engines | Anna Fang | Jihae | | |
| My Big Fat Greek Wedding | Cousin Nikki | Gia Carides | | |
| My Life Without Me | The Hairdresser | Maria de Medeiros | | |
| The Nevers | Maladie | Amy Manson | | |
| Nine Lives | Lorna | Amy Brenneman | | |
| Noel | Nina Vasquez | Penélope Cruz | | |
| One Mississippi | Tig Bavaro | Tig Notaro | | |
| Pearl Harbor | Nurse Martha | Sara Rue | | |
| The Pink Panther | Nicole Durant | Emily Mortimer | | |
| The Pink Panther 2 | Nicole Durant | Emily Mortimer | | |
| Prisoners | Nancy Birch | Viola Davis | 2016 BS Japan edition | |
| Private Practice | Dr. Amelia Shepherd | Caterina Scorsone | | |
| Queen of the Damned | Akasha | Aaliyah | | |
| Rémi sans famille | Mrs. Harper | Virginie Ledoyen | | |
| Red Cliff | Sun Shangxiang | Zhao Wei | | |
| Rizzoli & Isles | Detective Jane Rizzoli | Angie Harmon | | |
| The Running Man | Amber Méndez | María Conchita Alonso | VOD edition | |
| Running Wild with Bear Grylls | Gina Carano | | | |
| Sabrina, the Teenage Witch | Libby Chessler | Jenna Leigh Green | | |
| Scandal | Elizabeth North | Portia de Rossi | | |
| Scenes from a Marriage | Mira Phillips | Jessica Chastain | | |
| Sky Captain and the World of Tomorrow | Commander Franky Cook | Angelina Jolie | | |
| So Close | Kong Yat-Hung | Karen Mok | | |
| The Spirit | Silken Foss | Scarlett Johansson | | |
| Stealth | Lieutenant Kara Wade | Jessica Biel | | |
| Taking Lives | Illeana Scott | Angelina Jolie | | |
| Taxi | Belle Williams | Queen Latifah | | |
| Terminator Salvation | Blair Williams | Moon Bloodgood | | |
| The Thieves | Pepsee | Kim Hye-soo | | |
| The Time Machine | Mara | Samantha Mumba | | |
| Transporter 2 | Lola | Kate Nauta | DVD edition | |
| Twisters | Dani | Katy O'Brian | | |
| Van Helsing | Marishka | Josie Maran | DVD edition | |
| Wayward Pines | Beverly | Juliette Lewis | | |
| What Women Want | Lola | Marisa Tomei | 2003 NTV edition | |
| Wild Wild West | Rita Escobar | Salma Hayek | 2002 NTV edition | |
| The Witches | Grand High Witch | Anne Hathaway | | |
| Yellowjackets | Taissa | Tawny Cypress | | |

==== Animation ====
| Title | Role | Notes | Source |
|---|---|---|---|
| Adventure Time | Finn the Human | | |
| Atlantis: Milo's Return | Queen Kida | | |
| Batman: Gotham Knight | Detective Anna Ramirez | | |
| Cars 2 | Holley Shiftwell | | |
| Cinderella II: Dreams Come True | Mary | | |
| The Croods | Eep Crood | | |
| The Croods: A New Age | Eep Crood | | |
| DC League of Super-Pets | Mercy Graves | | |
| Elena of Avalor | Shuriki | | |
| Hey Arnold!: The Movie | Gerald Johanssen | | |
| Home Movies | Paula Small | | |
| Kung Fu Panda 3 | Viper | | |
| Middlemost Post | Lily | | |
| Monster House | Elizabeth "Zee" | | |
| The Proud Family: Louder and Prouder | Trudy Proud | | |
| Renaissance | Bislane Tasuiev | | |
| Sausage Party | Teresa del Taco | | |
| Teamo Supremo | Crandall/Captain Crandall | | |
| Teenage Mutant Ninja Turtles: Mutant Mayhem | Cynthia Utrom | | |
| Tinker Bell | Vidia | | |
| Tinker Bell and the Lost Treasure | Vidia | | |
| Tinker Bell and the Great Fairy Rescue | Vidia | | |
| Pixie Hollow Games | Vidia | | |
| Secret of the Wings | Vidia | | |
| The Pirate Fairy | Vidia | | |
| Tinker Bell and the Legend of the NeverBeast | Vidia | | |
| Toy Story 5 | | Cameo | |
| What If...? | Gamora | | |
