= Shingu: Secret of the Stellar Wars =

Anime television series by Tatsuo Sato and Madhouse

- Cover of the first English DVD

学園戦記ムリョウ (Gakuen Senki Muryō)
- Genre: Science fantasy
- Anime television series
- Directed by: Tatsuo Satō
- Written by: Tatsuo Satō
- Music by: Yuji Ohno
- Studio: Madhouse
- Licensed by: NA: Right Stuf Inc.
- Original network: NHK
- English network: US: Funimation Channel Anime Network (VOD)
- Original run: May 8, 2001 – December 4, 2001
- Episodes: 26

Shingu: Secret of the Stellar Wars (学園戦記ムリョウ, Gakuen Senki Muryō; lit. 'Record of School Wars Muryou') is an anime series directed by Tatsuo Sato and produced by Madhouse. Shingu aired from May 8, 2001, through December 4, 2001, on NHK. It ran for 26 episodes and was released on DVD on five volumes by The Right Stuf International in the United States.

On March 3, 2008, the series made its North American television debut on the Funimation Channel.

== Story ==
The setting is in a fictional seaside town called Tenmo in the Kanagawa Prefecture. In the year 2070, an alien invasion of Tokyo is repelled by a mysterious giant being which is almost a monster in itself. This battle is witnessed by Subaru Muryou and his grandfather who comments about it and watches it as if this is nothing to be surprised or shocked about, even though everyone else seems panicked. Later, a middle schooler named Murata Hajime, whose family had moved to Tenmo a few years ago, witnesses Muryou and a member of his school's student council, Kyouichi Moriguchi, fighting each other with some sort of super psychic powers. This causes a series of events which reveals to Hajime some secrets about Tenmo, one being that almost everyone in his school seems to know about the giant that defeated the alien invasion over Tokyo. Further to his shock is that it seems everyone in the older part of Tenmo holds this strange secret and in fact a deeper one, and has been holding it for many years: led by the leading families of the older part of the town, they have been protecting Earth for centuries, using the leading families' powers and the power of the giant, called "Shingu". As Hajime learns this, it comes as something of a shock to him that all the current members of the middle school student council are actually the guardians of this secret and of Shingu itself for this current generation. This includes Student Vice President Nayuta Moriyama, who, as it turns out, guards one of the biggest parts of the secret of Shingu. While all of these discoveries are a huge enough shock to him, Hajime also discovers that many of the town's other residents are in fact intergalactic diplomats. The more he learns and the closer his friendship with Muryou, Nayuta and the other members of the student council becomes, the deeper he is drawn into this secret. Especially as his friendship with Nayuta and Muryou grows deeper, Hajime slowly realizes he has a very large role to play in the future of both Shingu and Earth's protection.

== Characters ==
Muryou Subaru (統原無量, Subaru Muryou)

Voiced by: Issei Miyazaki (Japanese), Daniel Kevin Harrison (English)

This mysterious transfer student came to Misumaru Middle School wearing a 20th-century school uniform, something rarely seen in the year 2070. He's always calm and laid-back, but at the same time, he has secret powers that he rarely reveals. Little is known about Muryou; in fact, the more that's revealed about him, the more enigmatic he becomes. He seems to know something about the recent alien incidents, though, which makes Vice President Kyouichi instantly suspicious.

Hajime Murata (村田始, Murata Hajime)

Voiced by: Kenji Nojima (Japanese), Billy Regan (English)

The narrator of our story. He's a middle-schooler, and the class rep for 2nd year homeroom C. After discovering that Muryou and Kyouichi have astonishing powers, he decides to keep track of all the strange events that start to unfold – but soon finds himself more deeply involved than he bargained for. Hajime is very social, mature for his age, and adjusts well to even the most bizarre situations. He frequently breaks the fourth wall while narrating his feelings. The concept of speaking beyond the fourth wall can be considered in itself a great power.

Kyouichi Moriguchi (守口京一, Moriguchi Kyouichi)

Voiced by: Tomokazu Sugita (Janpanese), Dan Green (English)

Misumaru Middle School's passionate Student Vice President. He has a black belt in martial arts and a lightning-quick temper to match, but he's also very loyal and will stand by his friends no matter what. There appears to be some kind of connection between Kyouichi and Harumi; but at the moment, neither of them seems willing – or able – to acknowledge it. Despite all his harsh words, Kyouichi actually does have a soft side, and is hard not to like.

Nayuta Moriyama (守山那由多, Moriyama Nayuta)

Voiced by: Romi Paku (Japanese), Angora Deb (English)

The other vice president at Misumaru Middle School; she's an honor student who always goes by the rules. Daughter of the Shrine Priest at the local Tenmo Shrine, Nayuta is very serious, almost to a fault. She has trouble expressing her emotions, and she doesn't like the idea of depending on anyone else.

Hachiyou Tsumori (津守八葉, Tsumori Hachiyou)

Voiced by: Yuuji Ueda (Japanese), Brian Maillard (English)

Hachiyou is the student government president. His personality is very calm and quiet, but with a certain commanding presence – whenever trouble appears, Hachiyou is quick to take charge. He's a bit like a father figure for the group; with only a word from Hachiyou, even the hot-headed Nayuta and Kyouichi will calm down and follow his lead.

Shun Morihata (守機瞬, Morihata Shun)

Voiced by: Yumiko Kobayashi (Japanese), Tara Jayne (English)

Shun is the student government secretary. He's cheerful, sharp, articulate, and popular among the students. Shun has many responsibilities around the school; he's often called on to be an announcer at events, and he's a member of the Theatre Club – a natural match for his acting skills.

Harumi Mineo (峯尾晴美, Mineo Harumi)

Voiced by: Masumi Asano (Japanese), TBA (English)

The treasurer of the student government. She's quiet and demure, but also extremely resilient; she seems to deliberately avoid being in the spotlight, and usually hides her emotions. Harumi's role in the mystery that surrounds the Shingu is unclear, but one thing is certain – despite appearances, Harumi is a skilled fighter, and she takes her duties very seriously.

Setsuna Subaru (統原 瀬津名, Subaru Setsuna)

Voiced by: Wakana Yamazaki (Japanese), Megan Hollingshead (English)

Muryou's older sister. She's a college student who lives in Tokyo, but she often comes to Lady Momoe's home to visit Muryou. She stops by with all sorts of sweets from various parts of Japan. She has a cheerful disposition, and sometimes seems a bit scatterbrained. But like many people in Hajime's life, there's more to her meets the eye... Setsuna has many hidden qualities, but she's very good at looking after people.

Kyoko Murata (村田今日子, Murata Kyoko)

Voiced By: Noriko Hidaka (Japanese), Lisa Ortiz (English)

Hajime's mother. She has two children, Futaba (an elementary-schooler) and, of course, Hajime (a middle schooler). She's a young mother, and currently takes care of the kids and the house while her husband is away. Casual and easygoing, Kyoko's pretty laid back when it comes to the kids doing their schoolwork, but she's very strict about their manners. Kyoko is a woman of many skills; not only is she good at running the Murata household, but she plays a mean game of Bam Bam Sumo Tournament, too. She is employed by the local library to assist with taking ancient scrolls, old books and microfilms and converting them to a digital format. This involves memorizing the original, and sometimes having to translate the original, before entering it into the database.

Futaba Murata (村田双葉, Murata Futaba)

Voiced by: Rie Kugimiya (Japanese), Angora Deb (English)

Hajime's younger sister. She's a bubbly sixth grader who tends to fall in love with her brother's friends, a prime example being Muryou. Always optimistic, energetic and curious, Futaba is never afraid to speak her mind. She and her brother fight like cats and dogs...but in truth, she loves her brother a lot.

Momoe Sanemori (Lady Momoe) (真守百恵, Sanemori Momoe)

Voiced by: Hisako Kyōda (Japanese), Rachael Lillis (English)

The Head Mistress of the Sanemori family. She holds an important position among the people of Tenmo, but the nature of her position has yet to be revealed. Momoe seems to know the truth about many things – Tenmo, Nayuta, even Muryou – so it's no surprise that when important events take place, Momoe is there to guide the way with her wisdom.

Jiltosh (ジルトーシュ, Jiltosh)

Voiced by: Kenichi Ono (Japanese), John Campbell (English)

He is a Velunnian who uses several names, including Aloha, Ve-yan, and Jil, though he primarily uses Jiltosh. Unlike many aliens who attempt to blend in, Jiltosh wears a red Hawaiian shirt and has wavy hair. He serves as a diplomat, though his cheerful expression occasionally conceals another demeanor.

Tadakazu Yamamoto (山本忠一, Yamamoto Tadakazu)

Voiced by: Bon Ishihara (Japanese), Michael Alston Baley (English)

Hajime's homeroom teacher and Japanese history teacher. He has a very mellow personality and at first glance, he seems like an average, ordinary man. But, Yamamoto plays an important role in policing the area and is highly skilled in martial arts. Yamamoto is an easy-going, approachable guy, and he's very popular amongst his students.

Hiromi Isozaki (磯崎公美, Isozaki Hiromi)

Voiced by: Yōko Sasaki (Japanese), Carol Jacobanis (English)

Hiromi Isozaki (if that is, in fact, her real name), is the phys-ed instructor and teacher at Misumaru Middle School...or is this just a front? She may seem unemotional at times, but she is very much attached to her students. No matter what happens, she always does her best to be calm and in control.

Weinul (ウェンヌル, Weinul)

Voiced by: Shigeru Shibuya (Japanese), Marc Thompson (English)

Weinul is a lieutenant in the Zaiglian Space Force. Weinul is described as a man in search of the truth. To achieve that end, he decides to blend in with the people of Earth. Like other Zaiglians he's calm and collected, which also happen to be good traits for a lieutenant. Weinul is always ready and willing to adapt to new situations.

Kazuo Murata

Voiced by: Tetsuo Sakaguchi (Japanese), Wayne Grayson (English)

Hajime's father. He's kept quite busy with his work for a private company at the Tanegashima Space Center so he doesn't get to spend much time at home. Kazuo is cheerful and easygoing, but he does have a certain mystique. He will occasionally break the "fourth wall", too.

Kanata Myouken

Voiced by: Kōsuke Okano (Japanese), Bill Rogers (English)

This mysterious figure first appears during the big judo match between Mischu and Miyanomori. He's there under the guise of a simple team helper, but there's more to him than meets the eye. Kanata is quiet, but extremely confident – and he has every reason to be.

== Production notes ==
Despite airing in 2001, when most mainstream anime had transitioned away from traditional cel animation in favor of digital ink and paint for their production, Shingu stands out as an oddity for using cels for its entire run.

Consequently, Shingu: Secret of the Stellar Wars was among the final group of newly produced television anime created with traditional cel animation during the industry's transition to digital ink and paint in 2001. Other concurrent cel-animated productions included Noir, Galaxy Angel, The Family's Defensive Alliance, Mahoromatic, and Figure 17.

After the end of Figure 17, no other new cel made anime would be broadcast on television for over a year until the premiere of 2003's Astro Boy , which is the last new TV production (anime or otherwise) ever made using cels, and penultimate overall behind Sazae-san which kept using the process for the majority of its runtime for the next decade before it switched to digital ink and paint in October 2013.

== Episodes ==
Episode	Name
1	The War Record Begins
2	Muryou's Power
3	The Name is Shingu
4	The Time to Move
5	Gazing Eyes
6	A Peaceful Battle
7	Your Smile
8	A Humble Feast
9	After the Rain
10	For Tomorrow
11	Thank You, Courage
12	Despite Friendship
13	Secret Village Hometown
14	Our Summer
15	Father's Return
16	Calmly, but Suddenly
17	Chaotic Apology
18	Inherited Sorrows
19	Virtuous Fist
20	Impatient Optimism
21	Helpers Meet
22	Please Look Up The Sky
23	Federation and League
24	The Ones Which Are here
25	The Fake Awakens
26	The War Record Continues
