= Yumiko Kobayashi =

Japanese voice actress (born 1979)

- 小林 由美子
- Born: June 18, 1979 (age 47); Chiba Prefecture, Japan
- Status: Married
- Other name: Shubicchi (しゅびっち)
- Education: Wayo Women's University
- Occupation: Voice actress
- Years active: 1998–present
- Children: 2

Yumiko Kobayashi (小林 由美子, Kobayashi Yumiko; born June 18, 1979) is a freelance Japanese voice actress from Chiba Prefecture. She was formerly affiliated with Arts Vision until August 2007. She made her voice acting debut as Mita in Kirara while still in college in 1998, and her first lead role was as Kento Yūki in Dennō Bōkenki Webdiver in 2001. She is still good friends with Natsuko Kuwatani, Hisayo Mochizuki, and Nana Mizuki, members of the former voice acting unit Prits; all four voiced characters in Sister Princess.

In an interview in 2019, Kobayashi said that shortly after her debut, while researching how to play a boy who can be dubbed, she came to believe that there was no better way to act than as a child actor, but she was struck by Akiko Yajima's performance as Kevin, the main character in Home Alone, and has since made it her goal. Beginning with the July 6, 2018 episode, she took over the role of Shinnosuke Nohara in Crayon Shin-chan from Yajima, who had played the role since the show began airing on April 13, 1992.

== Filmography ==
=== Television animation ===
1999–2002

- Beast Wars II: Super Life-Form Transformers (1998), Lio Junior
- Excel Saga (1999), Excel Kobayashi (Opening Song)
- éX-Driver (2000), Sōichi Sugano
- Gate Keepers (2000), Hideki
- Love Hina (2000), Sarah McDougal
- A Little Snow Fairy Sugar (2001), Basil
- Magical Play (2001), Zucchini
- Sister Princess (2001), Mamoru
- Duel Masters (2002), Shobu Kirifuda, Katta Kirifuda
- Mirmo! (2002), Beruru

2003–2006

- Bomberman Jetters (2003), Kobon
- D.N.Angel (2003), young Takeshi Saehara
- Ikki Tousen (2003), Ukitsu
- Peacemaker Kurogane (2003), Ichimura Tetsunosuke
- Sonic X (2003), Bokkun
- The Prince of Tennis (2003), Taichi Dan
- Tottoko Hamutarō (2003), Solara
- Naruto (2004), Nawaki
- Superior Defender Gundam Force (2004), Genkimaru
- Yakitate!! Japan (2004), Kazuma Azuma
- My-Otome (2005), Mahya Blythe
- Tsubasa Chronicle (2005), young Kurogane

2007–2010

- Les Misérables: Shōjo Cosette (2007), Gavroche
- Shakugan no Shana (2007), Matake Ogata
- Shakugan no Shana Second (2007), Matake Ogata
- Katekyo Hitman Reborn! (2008), Ginger Bread
- Soul Eater (2008), Black Star
- Slayers Revolution (2008), Pocota
- Tales of the Abyss TV series (2008), Ion, Sync
- The Tower of Druaga: the Aegis of Uruk (2008), Yury
- Inazuma Eleven (2009), Saiji Kirigakure
- Gokyoudai Monogatari (2009), Junichirō Jinushi
- Tokyo Magnitude 8.0 (2009), Yuuki
- Angel Beats! (2010), Ooyama
- Stitch! ~ Best Friends Forever ~ (2010), Toyoda
- Pocket Monsters: Best Wishes! (2010), Elesa

2011–2014

- Blue Exorcist (2011), Yohei
- Kamisama Dolls (2011), Kirio Hyūga
- Shakugan no Shana III Final (2011), Matake Ogata
- Suite Precure (2011), Souta Minamino
- Humanity Has Declined (2012), Fairy
- JoJo's Bizarre Adventure (2012), Poco
- Ozuma (2012), Yamu
- Mysterious Joker (2014), Hachi
- The Seven Deadly Sins (2014), Mead
- Hozuki's Coolheadedness (2014), Shiro

2015–current

- Gunslinger Stratos (2015), Jonathan Sizemore
- Seraph of the End (2015), Lest Karr
- The Disastrous Life of Saiki K. (2016), Yūta Iridatsu
- Re:Zero − Starting Life in Another World (2016), Mild
- Duel Masters (2017), Joe Kirifuda
- Crayon Shin-chan (2018), Shinnosuke Nohara
- Digimon Adventure (2020), Koshiro Izumi
- Ninjala (2022), Van
- Tōsōchū: The Great Mission (2023), Hal Tomura
- Dragon Ball Daima (2024), Supreme Kai (Mini)
- One Piece (2025), Ginny
- The Elusive Samurai (2026), Suwa Yoritsugu^{Ep. 18 credits}

=== OVA ===
- Puni Puni Poemy (2001), Poemy "Kobayashi" Watanabe
- Hori-san to Miyamura-kun (2012), Souta Hori

=== ONA ===
- The Heike Story (2021)
- Fool Night (2026), Ivy

=== Theatrical animation ===
- Doraemon: Nobita and the New Steel Troops—Winged Angels (2011), Pippo
- Smile PreCure! The Movie: Big Mismatch in a Picture Book! (2012), Sun Wukong
- Aura: Koga Maryuin's Last War (2013), Itō
- Crayon Shin-chan: Honeymoon Hurricane ~The Lost Hiroshi~ (2019), Shinnosuke Nohara
- Crayon Shin-chan: Crash! Graffiti Kingdom and Almost Four Heroes (2020), Shinnosuke Nohara
- Crayon Shin-chan: Shrouded in Mystery! The Flowers of Tenkazu Academy (2021), Shinnosuke Nohara
- The Orbital Children (2022), Hiroshi Tanegashima
- Crayon Shin-chan: Mononoke Ninja Chinpūden (2022), Shinnosuke Nohara
- Drifting Home (2022), Taishi Koiwai
- Birth of Kitarō: The Mystery of GeGeGe (2023), Tokiya Nagata

=== Video games ===
- Eternal Sonata (2007), Beat

Unknown date

- Mega Man Powered Up, Mega Man
- Princess Maker 4, Lee
- Professor Layton and the Last Specter, Toni Barde
- Romancing SaGa, Aisha
- Super Robot Wars series, Ryoto Hikawa
- Star Ocean: Second Evolution, Leon D.S. Geeste
- Tokimeki Memorial Girl's Side: 2nd Kiss, Yuu Otonari
- God of War, Atreus
- Granblue Fantasy, Mimlemel
- Sdorica Sunset, Lio, Elio
- Ninjala, Van

=== Drama CDs ===
- Amai Kuchizuke (2012), Young Yuu Takamura

=== Dubbing ===
==== Live-action ====
- Boyhood, Mason Evans Jr. (Younger) (Ellar Coltrane)
- December Boys, Misty (Lee Cormie)
- Dolphin Tale, Sawyer Nelson (Nathan Gamble)
- Dragon Blade, Publius (Jozef Waite)
- Earth to Echo, Reginald "Munch" Barrett (Reese Hartwig)
- Falling Skies (season 1–3), Matt Mason (Maxim Knight)
- Hannah Montana: The Movie, Lilly Truscott (Emily Osment)
- Hereafter, Jason and Marcus (Frankie and George McLaren)
- I Am Legend (2010 TV Asahi edition), Ethan (Charlie Tahan)
- The Impossible, Lucas Bennett (Tom Holland)
- It Chapter One, Eddie Kaspbrak (Jack Dylan Grazer)
- It Chapter Two, Young Eddie Kaspbrak (Jack Dylan Grazer)
- Jingle All the Way 2, Noel Phillips (Kennedi Clements)
- Nanny McPhee and the Big Bang, Cyril Gray (Eros Vlahos)
- Parasite (2021 NTV edition), Park Da-song (Jung Hyeon-jun)
- Ready Player One, Zhou (Philip Zhao)
- Rust and Bone, Sam (Armand Verdure)
- Safe House, Joe Blackwell (Max True)
- The Spy Next Door, Ian (Will Shadley)
- Tale of Tales, Imma (Shirley Henderson)
- Trash, Raphael (Rickson Tevez)

==== Animation ====
- The Amazing World of Gumball, Darwin Watterson
- Chuggington, Wilson
