= List of Gakuen Alice characters =

The following is a list of characters from the anime and manga series Gakuen Alice.

== Students of Elementary School Division ==
=== Mikan Sakura ===
Sakura Mikan (佐倉 蜜柑) Voiced by: Kana Ueda

Mikan Sakura is the 10-year-old female protagonist of the story. She is characterized by being optimistic, childlike, cheerful, and energetic. She possesses the Nullification Alice, Inserting Alice, and Stealing Alice. She previously lived in the countryside with her grandfather and best friend Hotaru, until Hotaru moved away when going to study at Alice Academy, prompting Mikan to follow her friend. She used to be in the Special Ability Class but was transferred to the Dangerous Ability Class. She initially hates Natsume, but the two later grow close and fall in love. She learns of the atrocities of the Elementary School Principal and resolves to defeat him. After peace in the academy is restored, Mikan's memories are erased and she is expelled, but she later regains them, returns to the academy, and marries Natsume.

=== Hotaru Imai ===
Imai Hotaru (今井 蛍) Voiced by: Rie Kugimiya (anime), Miyuki Sawashiro (Gakuen Alice Drama CD--only released bundled with a copy of Hana to Yume magazine)

Hotaru Imai is Mikan's 10-year-old best friend and possesses the Alice of invention, which enables her to invent anything that comes to life easily, making her the target of admiration among technical and engineering companies. She is the complete opposite of Mikan, being intelligent, rational, aloof, and at times, cold and expressionless. Although she frequently scolds and hits her best friend, she is actually deeply caring and treasures her dearly like a sister, preferring to show her love in a different, more quiet, manner. Her relationship with her brother, Subaru, seems cool on the exterior as they often insult each other and compete in intelligence, but both recognise the fact that that is their way of being closer to each other through sibling rivalry and love. As a final gesture of her affection for Mikan, Hotaru sacrifices her existence to save Natsume from dying, causing her and Subaru to be trapped in the time realm.

=== Natsume Hyūga ===
Hyūga Natsume (日向 棗) Voiced by: Romi Park

Natsume Hyūga is the male protagonist in the series, possessing the Alice of fire, a powerful and uncontrollable Alice that runs in his family and will whittle away at his lifespan through overuse. He initially hates Mikan, and is thus shown often bullying and ignoring her, due to her stubbornness and naivety. However, he starts to see her caring and optimistic personality, and falls in love with her, referring to her as his sun or light. He dies in the battle against the Elementary School Principal but he is revived by Hotaru and Subaru. In the epilogue, Natsume marries Mikan and they live a happy life together.

=== Ruka Nogi ===
Nogi Ruka (乃木 流架) Voiced by: Miwa Yasuda

Ruka Nogi is a half-French, half-Japanese 10-year-old boy and Natsume's best friend. He possesses the Alice of animal pheromones, attracting animals of all kinds to adore him as much as he does them. Due to his handsomeness and gentle and pleasant personality, which balance out that of Natsume, he is popular among his classmates, especially girls. Out of the group of four, Ruka is the only one who decides to remain at the academy. He falls in love with Mikan, but supports her and Natsume's relationship.

=== Yū Tobita ===
Tobita Yū (飛田 裕) Voiced by: Fuyuka Oura

Yū Tobita is Class B's representative (thus known by the majority of the class as "Inchō" or "Inchou" however in the English translation of the manga he is known as "Prez") and possesses the Alice of illusion, allowing him to specialise in conducting hallucinations. He is Hotaru's companion before Mikan arrives at Alice Academy and is known for his shy, gentle personality and studious behavior. Yū wears rounded glasses. Initially, he has his Alice stolen by Yuka, but has it returned to him through Narumi. He is very good friends with Mikan and was one of the first to actually treat her nicely upon her entering Class B.

=== Sumire Shouda ===
Shouda Sumire (正田 スミレ) Voiced by: Chiwa Saito

Sumire Shouda is the self-proclaimed president of a fanclub idolizing Natsume and Ruka. Although she is known for being proud, blunt, bossy, and a bit of a nag, she cares deeply for her friends. She has the Cat-Dog Constitution Alice. Sumire is initially jealous of Mikan receiving so much attention from Natsume and Ruka, but warms up to her later in the series. In the epilogue, she starts dating Koko.

=== Nonoko Ogasawara ===
Ogasawara Nonoko (小笠原 野乃子) Voiced by: Ai Nonaka

Nonoko Ogasawara is one of Mikan's classmates despite being one academic year younger. She possesses the Alice of chemistry likes to experiment with dangerous chemicals. This geeky side of her led her to become good friends with Hotaru, and Mikan later in the series. Before coming to Alice Academy, she was an elegant girl from a rich family.

=== Anna Umenomiya ===
Umenomiya Anna (梅ノ宮 アンナ) Voiced by: Rie Kanda

Anna Umenomiya is a classmate of Mikan and possesses the Alice of cooking, making her known for her cooking skills, although this backfires when her dishes come to life. She is usually seen with Nonoko and she also has a crush on their teacher, Misaki. She looks up to her sister Miruku who has the same Alice as her.

=== Yōichi Hijiri ===
Hijiri Yōichi (聖 陽一) Voiced by: Chiwa Saitō

Yōichi Hijiri is a three-year-old boy who has the Evil Spirit Alice. He is attached to Natsume whom he sees as a big brother figure, but seems to dislike Mikan at first. Later, he becomes attached to Mikan and even kisses her on the cheek once. He eventually starts to "cling" to her later on in the manga and sees her as a big sister figure. He has become very fond of Mr. Bear. During the Hana Princess arc, he accidentally ate an aging candy that he stole from Hotaru which let him become eleven years older for the time that he was eating the candy. He is the youngest member of the Dangerous Ability Class.

=== Wakako Usami ===
Usami Wakako (宇佐美 和歌子) Voiced by: Junko Ueda

Wakako Usami is the best friend of Sumire and a minor character in the story. Her Alice is teleportation. Wakako only appears in the anime. She is also the reason why Mikan got a no-star ranking at the beginning of the story in the anime. She belongs to the Latent Ability type.

=== Hoshio Hoshino ===
Hoshino Hoshio (星野 保志雄)

Hoshio Hoshino is a boy from the Special Ability type class who is required to wear a mask at all times in order to control his Alice. He has the weather Alice. As a farewell gift, the rest of the Special Ability class gave him their Alice stones, Mikan included. He accepted all of them except Mikan's, because he figured that someone else, like Natsume, needed it more than he did. Mikan and the others were present when he was picked up, and on the day he left, there was a rainbow in the sky because he felt bliss.

=== Kokoroyomi ===
Kokoroyomi (心読み) Voiced by: Megumi Matsumoto

Kokoroyomi is a young boy from the same class as Mikan. He has the Alice that involves reading a person's mind, causing him to repeat the person's thoughts out loud and often (deliberately) making situations worse. He uses this against Mikan while she was being attacked by Mochu's a telekinesis. In the epilogue, it was revealed that he is now dating Sumire. He belongs to the Latent Ability Class and is a Single Star student.

=== Kitsuneme ===
Kitsuneme (キツネ目)

Kitsuneme is very good friends with Yome. He mostly spends time doing pranks with Yome. He and Yome are like twins due to their similar attitude. He has the Flying Alice. In the manga, he bought an 'infinite expansion chewing gum' to fly, even though he can already fly. He has a dog called 'Pochi'. He and Yome appear to have an innocent crush on Misaki Harada. He belongs to the Latent Ability Class.

== Students of Middle School Division ==
=== Tsubasa Andō ===
Andō Tsubasa (安藤 翼) Voiced by: Makoto Naruse

Tsubasa Andō is a middle school student who is one of the first students to be kind to Mikan. He has the Alice of shadow manipulation. He met Mikan when he saved her from bullies. They have a brother-sister relationship. He has a star-shaped mark on the left of his face, which is actually a punishment mark and will put him under pain by the person who gave it to him, which was Rui Amane, who seems to like him. Tsubasa found out about Ruka and Natsume's crush on Mikan when he hugged Mikan and the younger boys glared at him, and he enjoys teasing them about their feelings for Mikan. Since Natsume thinks that Mikan has a crush on Tsubasa, he makes it a point to be around them so nothing happens. In the epilogue, he and Misaki get married. He is a double star.

=== Misaki Harada ===
Harada Misaki (原田 美咲) Voiced by: Marina Inoue

Misaki Harada is good friends with Tsubasa and loves to pick on him a lot. However, she is in love with Tsubasa, even though she denied it at first. She also belongs to the Special Ability class and is one of the most beautiful-looking people there. She has the Doppelgänger Alice and is also a member of the Watching Over Ruka group, and it somehow appears that Kitsuneme and Yome have innocent crushes on her. When Tsubasa goes to save Mikan, he asks Misaki to be his girlfriend if he comes back alive, and she states that she thought they had already been going out. In the epilogue, they get married.

=== Megane ===
Megane (メガネ)

Megane is one of Tsubasa and Misaki's friends. He wears spectacles and has an Alice of Spirit hopping. 'Megane' is presumably a nickname since it means spectacles in Japanese. He can possess anything, from robots to oranges and vases. In the anime, it is said that he has a crush on Megumi during the Special Ability's role-playing game at the Alice Festival. He belongs to the Special Ability Class.

=== Yuri Miyazono ===
Miyazono Yuri (宮園 百合) Voiced by: Megumi Toyoguchi

Yuri Miyazono is very popular with the girls, mainly because of her female pheromone Alice. This is a fact that embarrasses her, but she claims that she is straight. She first appeared in episode 19 of the anime, where she was supposed to act as the prince but later was replaced by Mikan because of an incident where sticking gum/bomb was stuck on her hands, body, and foot. She is in the Somatic class.

=== Kaname Sonō ===
Sonō Kaname (園生 要) Voiced by: Sanae Kobayashi

Kaname Sonō is Tsubasa's best friend. He was a very lonely kid with few friends due to his condition. He possesses the Alice of placing souls into stuffed animals, thus causing them to come to life. He has poor health and the use of his Alice affects his lifespan. Despite this, he still makes dolls, for it is his way of proving to himself that he can make people happy. And the dolls he made serve as 'evidences of his existence'. He is also the creator of Mr. Bear. He belongs to the Technical Class, and is currently a Double Star.

=== Nobara Ibaragi ===
Ibaragi Nobara (茨木 のばら)

Nobara Ibaragi is a first-year student in the Middle School Division and is in the Dangerous Ability class. She has the Ice Alice. When she first met Mikan, she thought of her as a cute girl. In the academy, she is always hated because of her Ice Alice and thus people nickname her "The Snow Woman" or "Ice Princess". Mikan is the first one to approach her with kindness and warmth, leading her to admire Mikan very much. She shares a deep bond with Persona, despite his actions. After leaving the academy, she marries Persona and they have a daughter.

=== Hayate Matsudaira ===
Matsudaira Hayate (松平 颯)

Hayate Matsudaira is a Dangerous Ability type. He is a third-year student in the Middle School Division and in the same class as Tsubasa. He has the Wind Alice. He also has an extremely huge crush on Hotaru, who tends to insult him and doesn't remember his name. Because of saving Hotaru from the school (chapter 98), Hayate cannot go back to the Dangerous Ability Class anymore. As a request from Kakitsubata, Hayate is now allowed to stay in Hanahime-den. He only appears in the manga.

=== Yura Otonashi ===
Otonashi Yura (音無 由良) Voiced by: Junko Ueda

Yura Otonashi is the first student from Elementary Class B to graduate from Elementary School and move up to Middle School. She is in the Latent Ability Class and possesses the Alice to predict the future, though it first requires a comical dance to activate.

=== Kusami ===
Kusami is a second-year student at the academy. He also promised Natsume that he would never tell anyone that the culprit for the white team's default was actually Natsume himself. Before he could talk more, Natsume once again took his mask, ran toward Mikan, and hugged her to comfort her. After that, he returned the mask to Kusami and left.

=== Mochiage ===
Mochiage is the nearly bald kid that hangs around with Natsume. He has the Telekinesis Alice. At the beginning of the anime, he used his Alice on Mikan while Koko was reading her mind. He hates Mikan at first, but he later becomes friends with her, even to a comical extent. He is in the Latent Ability Class and a Double Star student.

== Students of High School Division ==
=== Akira Tonouchi ===
Tonouchi Akira (殿内 明良)

Akira Tonouchi is the representative of the Special Ability type. He has the Amplification Alice. He is a playboy and likes girls a lot. He particularly likes touching and flirting with Mikan, which often makes Natsume jealous. Mikan likes him very much and gets along with him well. Natsume, like Tsubasa, doesn't get along with him. He has grown attached to Mikan as well. He only appears in the manga.

=== Hayami ===
Hayami is the head of the High School News Department. Since he has an excellent eyesight and hearing Alice, he is able to get news and rumors very fast, just by listening carefully. He sits in the News Department Club activity room all day, and is described by Tono as a 'news freak'. He sometimes wears glasses, to enhance his already excellent eyesight.

=== Shūichi Sakurano ===
Sakurano Shūichi (櫻野 秀一) Voiced by: Atsushi Kisaichi

Shūichi Sakurano is the student council president and the main representative for the school. He is a special star and has the Teleportation Alice.

=== Subaru Imai ===
Imai Subaru (今井 昴) Voiced by: Tokuyoshi Kawashima

Subaru Imai is Hotaru's older brother, thus his looks and attitude is very similar to Hotaru's. He has the Healing and Pain Alice. Even though he acts cool in front of Hotaru, he truly cares for her. Subaru is normally cold and doesn't hesitate to throw insults at Hotaru, though he has a soft spot for Mikan. He is second in command to Sakurano and is the second representative of the school. He came to the Alice Academy when he was 5 years old. Subaru is a Special Star. He and Hotaru sacrifice themselves to save Natsume from dying by altering the past.

=== Shizune Yamanouchi ===
Yamanouchi Shizune (山之内 静音)

Shizune Yamanouchi is a third year student in the High School Division. She has the Sound Alice and is quite the schemer. She is the representative for the Technical Class and Hotaru Imai's senior.

=== Hijiri Goshima ===
Goshima Hijiri (五島 聖)

Hijiri Goshima is the president of the student council and was instructed by the High School Principal to assist Mikan and the others in the escape from the disciplinary group of the academy. He is the representative of the Somatic types. He always has on a smile and helped Mikan discover her Stealing Alice. His Alice allows him to change appearances. He secretly works for Kuonji and carried out the assassination of Yuka. After nearly being killed by Narumi during the rebellion against Kuonji, Goshima is punished and reformed for his crimes.

=== Rui Amane ===
Amane Rui (周 瑠衣)

Rui Amane is fond of guys that are younger than he is. Rui is the person who gave Tsubasa the star on his cheek called the "Mark of Obedience", but when he was young, Rui gave him 3 stars on his cheek. Rui also has a huge crush on Tsubasa, so Tsubasa tries to avoid him as much as possible. He seems to show care and concern for Nobara.

=== Hajime Yakumo ===
Yakumo Hajime (八雲 一)

Hajime Yakumo is a Dangerous Ability type and is usually a calm and composed person. He has a bandage over his face. He has the Insect Manipulation Alice.

== Faculty members ==
=== Narumi L. Anju ===
Narumi・Eru・Anju (鳴海・L・杏樹) Voiced by: Akira Ishida

Narumi L. Anju is Mikan's homeroom teacher, who often deals with Natsume when he gets in trouble or tries to break out of the academy. Even though he is a bit negligent as a teacher, he loves his students and wants to protect them. In both the manga and anime Narumi allows Mikan to call him "Dad" which is ironic because Mikan is the daughter of his unrequited love, Yuka Azumi. In fact, it is revealed that his reason for staying at the school is to protect the students; a promise he made to Yuka when he last saw her as a student.

=== Misaki ===
Misaki (岬) Voiced by: Takahiro Sakurai

Misaki is a teacher at the Alice Academy. Seems to be stoic in his expressions, yet cares for the students. During his first meeting with Mikan, he helped her and introduced her to the academy. He is Narumi's classmate during school days and frequently bullied and teased by him. Nonetheless, their friendship somehow persisted.

=== Serina Yamada ===
Yamada Serina (山田 瀬里奈) Voiced by: Miho Yamada

Serina Yamada is a mysterious English teacher at the school. She is almost always seen with her crystal ball, especially since her Alice is of 'sight', which enables her to see things happening anywhere at present time. Serina is seen often with Narumi, but in the series, she rarely leaves the faculty room. She is the Latent Ability Class teacher.

=== Jinno ===
Jinno (神野) Voiced by: Dai Matsumoto

Jinno is the head teacher of the Elementary Division and teaches math. A frog on his shoulder punctuates every statement he makes with a croak. His Alice is lightning, which is inherited from his family. He is a cold-hearted man who does not hesitate to use his Alice to punish his students. He is least trustful of Mikan and is the reason for Mikan's 'no star' rating in the beginning. He softened up at the end of the anime series, he adapted to Mr. Narumi's style of teaching.

=== Nodacchi ===
Noda (野田) Voiced by: Mamoru Miyano

Nodacchi is the moderator of the Special Ability Class. He has the Alice of time-traveling. He seems to like appearing out of nowhere, but in fact, it's because he often cannot control when he is going to disappear (to strange time dimensions) or appear (back in school) – caused by faults in his ability. He is an easygoing and carefree teacher; that is why the Special Ability type students like him so much.

=== Fukutan ===
Fukutan (副担) Voiced by: Hirofumi Nojima

Fukutan is Elementary Class B's substitute teacher because of the frequent absence of Narumi. He is a teacher of the Somatic types and he also teaches Home Economics. The students, except for Mikan, and Yū, do not respect him and usually torment him, leaving him to run out of the room in fright and tears.

He desperately wants Narumi to stay and teach his students instead of him. His Alice is the ability to grow his hair to extreme lengths and control it (that's why he always ties his hair as the ribbon controls his powers).

=== Makihara ===
Makihara (槙原)

Makihara is the Social Studies teacher and also is the moderator of the Latent Ability Class. In the anime, he appeared with several other teachers while Mikan and Sumire ran out of the academy as they were trying to save Natsume. He is mentioned briefly by Persona (disguised as Serio) in the Social Studies exam. In the manga, he accompanies Narumi in one of the trips made to persuade Ruka and Natsume to enter Gakuen Alice.

=== Izumi Yukihira ===
Yukihira Izumi (行平 泉水)

Izumi Yukihira was Mikan's father and the younger brother of Kazumi Yukihira. His Alice was Nullification. He entered in the academy at age 22 and became the moderating teacher of the Special Ability Class befriended a then 10-year-old Yuka when she was sad about being abandoned by her parents. A few years later, the two fell in love but Izumi was killed by Rei who was brainwashed by Kuonji into thinking Izumi never cared about him. His death was ruled a suicide but many suspected he was murdered.

=== Persona / Rei Serio ===
Persona (ペルソナ)/Serio Rei (芹生 零) Voiced by: Shin-ichiro Miki

Persona is a mysterious teacher who wears a mask at all times. He is the moderator for the Dangerous Ability Class and works as a liaison between the academy and the Japanese government. His Alice is the Death Alice that allows him to 'kill' anything he touches. He is responsible for much of Natsume's grief but Persona is actually guilt-ridden for killing Izumi. He shares a bond with Nobara. After betraying Kuonji and reconciling with Mikan, Persona leaves the academy, marries Nobara, and they have a daughter.

=== Kuonji ===
Kuonji is the Elementary School Principal and source of the academy's tragedies. He has the Clone Alice and, although he is an adult, he appears as a child due to Yuka inserting Alice stones to hinder his powers. He formed the Dangerous Ability Class to conduct secret government operations, has clones in charge of government positions that oversee the Academy, and goes as far as to commit murder to get his way. He desired Yuka for her Stealing Alice, but then sought Mikan as her replacement. After killing Yuka and trying to do the same to Mikan and Natsume, Kuonji is betrayed and killed by Luna.

=== Hīmemiya ===
Hīmemiya is the Middle School Division Principal and the founder of the Hana Princess. She has the strongest Barrier Alice that protects the academy and is referred to as the 'protecting goddess'. She takes a special interest in Mikan for being Yuka's daughter and protected her from Kuonji. After her retirement, she is succeeded by her relative, Shiki.

=== Kazumi Yukihira ===
Kazumi Yukihira is the High School Principal. He is also Mikan's paternal uncle and Izumi's older brother. He has the Detection and Longevity Alices. He loved his brother dearly and was devastated by his death, and suspected Kuonji was responsible. He later watches over Mikan and protects her from Kuonji.

=== Masachika Shiki ===
Masachika Shiki is a former member of Z and Yuka's partner. He has the Barrier Alice and is related to Hīmemiya, and has been by Yuka's side since they were in the academy together to protect her. He is secretly in love with her but is content with being her companion. After her death, he takes the role as Milan's protector and becomes the new Middle School Principal.

=== Yuka Azumi/ Yuka Yukihira ===
Azumi Yuka (安積 柚香)

Yuka is a member of the Anti-Alice organization called Zero and is referred to as "That Person". She has the Stealing, Insertion, and Transportation Alices. She was sold to the academy by her parents as a child and fell in love with Izumi but she desires by Kuonji. She fled from the academy after his death and have birth to Mikan, whom she abandoned to protect her. Years later, she returns to the academy to rescue Mikan and the two reconcile before she is killed by a bomb planted by Goshima at Kuonji's order.

=== Luna Koizumi ===
Koizumi Runa (小泉 月)

Luna Koizumi is a secret assassin and spy for Kuonji and Yuka's former best friend. She has the Soul-Sucking Alice. As a child, she was rejected by her parents and peers but befriended Yuka and fell in love with Kuonji. When she saw Kuonji's interest in Yuka, she started to hate Yuka. Years later, she poses as a child to harass Mikan and give her to Kuonji. However, after witnessing Yuka's death at Kuonji's hands, Luna was overcome with guilt and betrayed Kuonji, and kills him.

== Zero ==
=== Reo Mouri ===
Mōri Reo (毛利 玲生) Voiced by: Kenichi Suzumura

Reo Mouri is a graduate from the academy, who turned into an international celebrity but is also a secret spy for Zero. He has the Voice Manipulation Alice. He arrives in the academy to kidnap Natsume but this plan is ruined due to Mikan and Sumire's intervention. He returns once again to assassinate Kuonji but the students and teachers rebel against Kuonji, and Reo helps tend to Narumi.

=== Mihara Kanbu ===
Having appeared only once, he is a member of "Z" organization, and has the Alice that turns people to stone. This is why he is sometimes called 'Medusa' by other members of "Z", and is a 'sadist' that enjoyed harming Mikan and her friends.

=== Shidō ===
He is Reo Mouri's agent. He has the Barrier Alice, which renders other Alices useless when caught inside the barrier. He also used to go to the academy.

== Miscellaneous ==
=== Mr. Bear ===
Bear-san (Mr.ベア) A mute teddy bear with a freedom-loving soul, commonly referred to as "Bear". Despite its cute appearance, it is short-tempered and frequently lashes to any stranger that approaches him. It seems to enjoy beating up Mikan. He only listens to Kaname, his creator, and Kaname's best friend, Tsubasa. However, he later develops a close friendship with Mikan after she sews him back together for trying to keep Kaname alive. From then, he becomes one of Mikan's closest companions.

=== Piyo ===
Piyo is a gigantic mutated chick under the care of the Middle school Class B students. It first appeared in episode 4 after Mikan was beaten up by Mr. Bear. It cries when it's hungry and won't stop until it is fed. It is also attached to Ruka-pyon,

=== Aoi Hyuuga ===
Hyuuga Aoi (日向 葵)

Aoi Hyuuga is Natsume's younger sister and also has the Fire Alice, though hers is weaker. When she accidentally destroyed their village, Natsume took the blame and was sent to the academy, and Aoi was held captive by Persona. With his friends' help, Natsume is able to rescue Aoi and, as her Alice has disappeared, she is returned to her father. As a teenager, she enrolls in the Alice Academy Drama School.

=== Kaoru Igarashi (Hyuuga) ===
Igarashi Kaoru (五十嵐 馨)

Kaoru Igarashi is Natsume and Aoi's mother. She had the Memory Manipulation Alice and worked for Himiya as a spy. She became Yuka's closest friend and took Yuka in when she ran away from the academy, and helped with Mikan's delivery. Kaoru began secretly investigating Kuonji and his clones. When Natsume was a toddler, she was killed in a car accident, though her family and Yuka suspected Kuonji was behind it.

=== Mr. Hyuuga ===
Mr. Hyuuga is Natsume and Aoi's father. He is a painter and there are quite a number of artworks in his house. He has the Fire Alice. At the academy, he was caught making out with Kaoru by Yuka and Izumi, and Yuka was surprised to learn the two got married. He tried to stop Natsume from going to the academy but was eventually reunited with both of his children when Aoi was returned to him.

=== Ruka's mother ===
Ruka's mother is French. When Ruka was still young, she desperately tried to protect Ruka from being taken away by the people from the academy and even threatened them with a knife saying she would kill or be killed to stop them from taking Ruka. She was against Ruka befriending Natsume but she eventually realizes that she was stopping Ruka from being happy and needs to let him have more freedom. She also lets him go with Natsume to the academy to support Natsume. She only appears in the manga. She is said to be really beautiful.

=== Mikan's grandfather ===
Mikan's grandfather adopted her when she was an infant, after her mother left her in his care to protect her from the academy. He is not related to Mikan by blood, but she still considers him as her grandfather. He had worked in a temple and daycare. He is hard on Mikan but cares deeply for her. He tries to get her back after she leaves for the academy but lets her stay when she writes him letters about her decision to go to the academy.

=== Penguin ===
Pengī (ペンギー)

A robotic penguin built by Hotaru in the manga for a client. The client returned it when it began crying from being separated from Hotaru. It has a pouch from which odd tools are sometimes pulled out. It figured prominently in the Z arc when it stowed away in Mikan's backpack and eventually ends up saving the day and sadly vanishes into the depths of a hole in the ground not to be seen again. It only appears in the manga. TokyoPop has officially named him "Pengy." Penguin saved Mikan at the end but will likely not return as said in the profile.

=== Takahashi ===
Voiced by: Sakiko Uran

Takahashi is the robotic rector of the dormitory of Alice Academy. Takahashi can be really strict at times when she has to follow orders. She is introduced by linchō to Mikan when she arrived in the academy.

=== Amanatsu ===
Amanatsu (甘夏) Voiced by: Kana Ueda

Amanatsu is a robot that looks exactly like Mikan, which Hotaru first invented when she came to the academy. She only exists in the anime. According to Amanatsu, she was made to look like Mikan so that she can make people's heart warm with her smile, just like what Mikan did to Hotaru. Amanatsu literally means orange.

=== Buta ===
Buta (ブタ)

Buta appears in the manga and is actually the author herself, Tachibana Higuchi. She occasionally appears in the anime dressed as a student sitting in the 3rd row, same as Hotaru, on the right side of the room. In volume 12 of the manga, she was given a Hana Hime (lit. Flower Princess) name, which is "Tachibana no kimi".
