= Akaboshi (film) =

- Directed by: Ryohei Yoshino
- Starring: Romi Park; Aren
- Release date: October 2012 (25th Tokyo International Film Festival)
- Running time: 140 minutes
- Country: Japan
- Language: Japanese

Akaboshi (あかぼし) ("Morning Star") is a 2012 Japanese drama film directed by Ryohei Yoshino. Romi Park, previously known primarily for voice acting for anime, performed in her first live-action role. The plot centers on Parks' character, who is a mother disturbed by the disappearance of her husband, and focuses on her relationship with her young son as she becomes drawn into a cult-like religious group.

== Cast ==
- Romi Park
- Aren
