= List of Turn A Gundam characters =

This is a list of characters from Japanese mecha anime Turn A Gundam, the only series to depict the Correct Century (CC) timeline of the Gundam metaseries.

== Earth ==
Loran Cehack
Voiced by: Romi Park (Japanese), Annika Odegard (English, Dynasty Warriors: Gundam series)
Moonrace; Loran Cehack is the main character of the series and the pilot of the eponymous mobile suit, System-∀99, known as Turn A Gundam. Loran and his friends Keith and Fran are secretly sent to Earth by Dianna Soreil in advance of her main colonial force, and to ensure that Moonrace settlers can still survive there. The three of them separate upon landing and integrate themselves into the Terran population.
Loran is saved from drowning by Sochie and Kihel Heim soon after parting with Keith and Fran. The wealthy Heim family takes him on as a limousine driver and quickly discovers his skills as a mechanic. Loran loves his new life on Earth and chooses to take part in a coming-of-age ceremony to become a true member of his community. His effeminate looks earn him the nickname "Laura", which he eventually uses as an alias.
Loran discovers the Turn A Gundam during the first attack by the Moonrace's Dianna Counter. He uses it to support the Earth Militia and tries to foster negotiations between the Earth and the Moon. However, he would much rather have the Turn A Gundam perform domestic chores than fight battles. Loran is torn between his desire to protect his Earthrace friends from the Moonrace military, and his belief that the Moonrace should be allowed to settle on Earth. Even so, he is unwavering in his faith in Queen Dianna Soreil and her dream of peaceful colonization.
The System-∀99 Turn A Gundam, alternately known as the WD-M01, "White Doll," or "Mustache"," was constructed by a space-faring human civilization millennia ago in anticipation of an interstellar war with unknown threats from outside the Solar System. As such, it is equipped with multiple highly sophisticated and advanced systems and weapons. The most notable of these is the Moonlight Butterfly system, which releases countless nanomachines that can disrupt and destroy technology. The full activation of this system is what caused society on Earth to regress to pre-industrial levels in the distant past.
Loran and Turn A Gundam are playable characters in the video games Dynasty Warriors: Gundam 1, 2, and 3, with a Laura Rola costume on Dynasty Warriors: Gundam 2, and Super Robot Wars Alpha Gaiden, where they are tied into the storyline.

=== Inglessa Militia ===
Guin Sard Rhineford
Voiced by: Gō Aoba
Terran; Guin Sard Rhineford is a charming young nobleman who rules the principality of Inglessa. He seems dedicated to brokering a peaceful agreement between the Terrans and the Moonrace, and to building up the Earth Militia in case those talks fall through. After his base of power, the Nocis City is destroyed. He masterminds the Terrans' journey into space to confront the Moonrace. He uses his relationship with the Luziannan princess Lily Borjarno to retain his influence after the fall of Inglessa.
Guin is motivated by personal ambition rather than the welfare of his people. He makes a Faustian pact with Gym Ghingnham to try and secure Moonrace technology for his own gain. His treacherous lust for power ultimately led to his downfall. Gym's defeat forces him into exile, and Lily Borjarno takes the place he wanted, forming diplomatic relations with the Moonrace and ushering in a new industrial age.
Michael Gern
Voiced by: Tetsuo Kanao
Terran; a colonel in the Inglessa Militia. Michael Gern is a proud and straightlaced man who follows orders until they are completed. He has a wife and a young son.
Yanny Oviess
Voiced by: Takuya Kirimoto
Terran; a sergeant in the Inglessa Militia, later promoted to second lieutenant. He has a stubborn personality and works against Dianna with Michael Gern.
Ladderrum Kune
Voiced by: Ikuya Sawaki
Terran; Miashei's father, Ladderrum is skilled fighter pilot and aircraft developer. He performs mechanical maintenance for the Militia.
Miashei Kune
Voiced by: Noriko Kitō
Terran; Ladderrum's daughter, and one of the Inglessa Militia's top pilots. Miashei is Sochie's best friend and the one who taught her how to operate machines. She is a bright, sensible girl, and is often called upon to act as a voice of reason when Sochie is being too hot-headed.
Miashei and Sochie fight as a team using a pair of salvaged AMX-Kapool mobile suits.
Joseph Yaht
Voiced by: Setsuji Satō
Terran; leader of the Inglessa Militia's Jalopy Squad. Joseph comes from an ethnic minority that is persecuted in Adeska. He left his homeland to assist Sid Munzer and only departs the excavation team once he is needed to pilot the Militia's FLAT-LO6D FLAT. Joseph is a brave man with a good heart. He quickly forms a romantic relationship with Fran Doll in spite of his brusque, taciturn personality.

=== Luzianna Militia ===
Lily Borjarno
Voiced by: Ai Kobayashi
Terran; the youngest child of Lord Borjarno, who rules over the Luzianna territory. Lily initially appears to be a little more than a spoiled dilettante. She behaves pettily towards the disguised Diana Soreil, and she claims to work for the Militia out of boredom. It seems like she's willing to allow Guin to use her as a pawn so long as he indulges her infatuation.
As the series progresses, it becomes clear that Lily is in fact an insightful and astute politician. She knows the importance of gathering powerful friends and allies, and has no qualms about ditching Guin once he becomes a liability instead of an asset. Lily negotiates with Agrippa Maintainer on the Earth's behalf and takes control of the Willgame after Guin's fall from grace.
Lord Borjarno
Terran; the lord of Luzianna. He has thirteen children, including Lily Borjarno.
Mallygan
Voiced by: Hiroya Ishimaru
Terran; a lieutenant-colonel in the Luzianna Militia. An old-fashioned man with aristocratic tastes, he dresses in a manner he believes suits his power and status.
Gavane Gooney
Voiced by: Yoshitada Ōtsuka
Terran; Captain of the Luzianna Militia's Suicide Squad. The Suicide Squad is a group of skilled soldiers who pilot Luzianna's prized MS-06 Bojarnon, which are in fact salvaged MS-06 Zaku IIs. Gavane's personal unit is an MS-05 Zaku I referred to as the MS-05 Borjarnon Gavane Gooney Custom. Gavane is well liked by his men and very proud of his squadron. He develops feelings for Sochie Heim, and tries to protect her even though he respects her skills as a warrior. The pair become engaged in spite of Sochie's lingering feelings for Loran, but Gavane is killed before they can be married.
Aimes
Voiced by: Hiroshi Matsumoto
Terran; a member of the Suicide Squad.
John
Terran; a member of the Suicide Squad.

=== Heim Family ===
Kihel Heim
Voiced by: Rieko Takahashi
Terran; oldest daughter of the Heim family. Though Kihel is a wealthy heiress, she chooses to look for work and gain real-world experience rather than attend university. She sticks close to Guin Rhineford during Dianna Counter's first attack, and uses the opportunity to become his assistant. Her new position brings her to the attention of the leaders of the Moonrace.
Kihel bears a striking resemblance to Dianna Soreil, which allows her to become the Queen's double. She takes Dianna's place at the Queen's behest and, due to events beyond their control, ends up having to impersonate Dianna and lead the Dianna Counter on a long-term basis. The two go on to switch names and roles several times. Kihel and Dianna share many qualities beyond appearance. Their ideals are so aligned that for a time they consider themselves a single person. Even so, Kihel has much more energy than Dianna, and does not share Dianna's longing for an ordinary life. She is very good at hiding her insecurity, which is whether or not she can live up to Dianna's example.
Kihel is aware that Harry Ord is using her to draw threats away from the true Dianna. This does not stop her from falling in love with him. She permanently switches places with Dianna at the end of the series, and rules over the Moonrace with Harry at her side.
Sochie Heim
Voiced by: Akino Murata
Terran; second daughter of the Heim family. Sochie is a spoiled, headstrong tomboy who is continually overshadowed by her sister Kihel. She was determined to join the Inglessa Militia even before Dianna Counter's attack, and is among the first to pilot one of Sid Munzer's excavated mobile suits. Eventually, Sochie becomes a well-respected soldier, though her AMX-109 Kapool is one of the weakest mobile suits in the series.
The death of Sochie's father causes her to hate the Moonrace. She feels betrayed when she discovers that her crush Loran is from the Moon. It takes a long time for her to grow up and soften her views. While Sochie suffers a great deal of loss over the course of the series, her trials make her a stronger person, and she never loses her fighting spirit. She develops a romantic interest for Loran. Loran's exact feelings are never clarified, but they kiss at the end of the show. Even if he is fond of Sochie, Loran takes on a mission to accompany Dianna, leaving Sochie behind, who becomes frustrated and sad.
Dylan Heim
Voiced by: Katsumi Chou
Terran; the head of the Heim family and the father of Kihel and Sochie. Dylan is the president of the Heim family's mining company. He is killed during the Dianna Counter's first show of force on Earth.
Mistress Heim
Terran; Dylan's wife and Kihel and Sochie's mother. She is driven mad by her husband's death.
Sam
Voiced by: Hidenari Ugaki
Terran; a servant of the Heim family.
Jessica
Voiced by: Chikako Akimoto
Terran; an elderly retainer of the Heim family. Jessica is tasked with caring for Kihel and Sochie's mother in their absence.

=== Adeska Nation ===
Quoatl
Terran; the former king of Adeska. It is Quoatl's duty to allow the new king to ritualistically kill him, but he evades death because his successor lacks the will to strike him down.
Taruka
Terran; the new king of Adeska. Taruka is unable to formally take the throne because Quoatl has gone into hiding. The fight against Dianna Counter gives him the courage to fulfill his obligations and grant Quoatl an honorable death.
Mayalito
Terran; Quoatl's only remaining retainer. Like Joseph Yaht, Mayalito comes from an ethnic minority that is persecuted in Adeska. Unlike Joseph Yaht, she refuses to leave her ancestral home for a better life. Her loyalty to Quaotl is so absolute that she chooses to die by his side.

=== Other Civilians ===
Sid Munzer
Voiced by: Akio Nojima
Terran; an elderly archeologist searching for remnants of the Earth's "dark history". He works on the excavation of mobile suits which are used by the Earth Militias to fight the Moonrace.
Niven Horace
Voiced by: Hirohiko Kakegawa
Moonrace; an engineer from the Moon who defects to the Earth Militias when it becomes clear that Dianna Counter can't provide for all of the civilian settlers. Without him the Terrans would not be able to use a great deal of their recovered technology.
Will Game
Voiced by: Kenichi Sakaguchi
Terran; a young man who is descended from Dianna Soreil's lost love, the original Will Game. He is obsessed with going to the Moon to prove that his ancestor really did romance the legendary Queen. This leaves him vulnerable to manipulation by Teteth Halleh.
Will located and began the excavation of the Terrans' sole spaceship. After his death it is named the "Willgame" in his honor.
Verlaine Bond
Terran; the daughter of a baker. Keith Laijie finds work as a servant to the Bond family after landing on Earth, and the two become romantically involved.
Anise Bell
Terran; Verlaine's grandmother. Anise is a stubborn old woman. She refuses to evacuate from her farm because of her worry over what mobile suit battles will do to the land.

== Moonrace ==
Dianna Soreil
Voiced by: Rieko Takahashi
Moonrace; the Queen of the Moon, Dianna Soreil is the hereditary ruler of the Moonrace. Now that the Earth has regenerated from the destruction wrought by the Dark History, she believes that it is time for her subjects to return to Earth. Dianna lands a colonial force on the Earth in the hopes that they will be allowed to live in America's sparsely-populated sunbelt area. Unfortunately, she fails to take Terran resistance to the migration into account, and does not anticipate that her more ambitious subjects might turn against her in her absence. Events quickly spiral out of her control.
Dianna has lived for centuries using the Moonrace's cryogenic techniques. Her desire to live on Earth is a product of her weariness with her unchanging life on the Moon. She is an intelligent and commanding leader, but she lacks the drive of her young double, Kihel Heim. Dianna is overjoyed when assuming Kihel's identity allows her to lead a simple life. She only returns to the Moon in order to correct the rash mistakes she made in her rush towards repatriation.
At the end of the series Dianna permanently switches places with Kihel. Dianna is shown wearing a ring. This often causes viewers to debate whether or not she is married to Loran.
Diana is a supporting character for Loran and a necessary ally for Gym in the game Dynasty Warriors: Gundam 2.
Harry Ord
Voiced by: Tetsu Inada
Moonrace; Harry Ord is the head of Dianna's Royal Guard, and reports directly to the Queen herself. He pilots a distinctive gold-plated MRC-F20 SUMO and is one of the most skilled fighters in the series. An accomplished military strategist, Harry judges situations with a cool and rational demeanor. He is the only person who is readily able to distinguish between Kihel Heim and Dianna Soreil.
Harry remains loyal to Dianna throughout the series. Though he falls in love with Kihel, his duty to the throne always comes first. His true feelings are often hidden behind a pair of red sunglasses.

=== Dianna Counter ===
Phil Ackman
Voiced by: Tsuyoshi Koyama
Moonrace; a captain of the Dianna Counter forces, later promoted to major. He is a repatriation convoy commander and a military hardliner. When Kihel (in the guise of Dianna) refuses to conquer the sunbelt territory by force, Ackman rebels against her authority and takes personal control over the Dianna Counter forces. He intends to set himself up as king of a new Moonrace nation on Earth.
Ackman realizes the error of his ways after Gym Ghingnham attacks Earth, and pledges his life to Dianna in order to atone for his rebellion.
Poe Aijee
Voiced by: Yumiko Nakanishi
Moonrace; a lieutenant in the Dianna Counter forces. Phil Ackman promises to make Poe his queen if she supports him against Dianna Soreil. Poe becomes emotionally unstable because her missions are continually foiled by Loran Cehack and Harry Ord.
Miran Rex
Voiced by: Ryuji Mizuno
Moonrace; Dianna's adjutant consular officer. He quarrels with Phil Ackman regarding Dianna, but eventually comes to ally with the former. Miran Rex is responsible for selling Dianna out to the Agrippa Faction.
Corin Nander
Voiced by: Yasuhiko Kawazu
Moonrace; a military prisoner shipped to Earth by Agrippa Maintainer. Nander was an elite soldier during the Dark History. The Moonrace's cryogenic freezing techniques have allowed him to survive for thousands of years after the end of the war, at the cost of sustaining severe brain damage. He is delusional and almost childlike when not on the battlefield.
Nander is obsessed with destroying the Turn A because he remembers the suffering that Gundams were responsible for during the Dark History. His fixation leads to the destruction of Nocis City, but he later reforms after being befriended by Dianna.
Bruno
Voiced by: Kazunari Tanaka
Moonrace; initially one of Nander's subordinates and a member of the Dianna Counter forces, he later joins the Earth Militia. Bruno is an MS Gozzo pilot and Jacop's partner.
Jacop
Voiced by: Hidenari Ugaki
Moonrace; initially one of Nander's subordinates and a member of the Dianna Counter forces, he later joins the Earth Militia. Jacop is an MS Gozzo pilot and Bruno's partner.

=== RRET Team (Retriever Regiment for Earth Turnback) ===
Cancer Kafka
Voiced by: Urara Takano
Moonrace; the RRET Team's combat leader. Like all the members of the RRET Team, Cancer is the descendant of a group of settlers whom Dianna abandoned on Earth over 100 years ago. Cancer is a fierce and boisterous warrior. She stays loyal to the Queen in spite of the poor treatment her people receive from Dianna Counter. She sacrifices her life to keep Dianna Soreil out of the hands of Gym Ghingnham.
Muron Muron
Voiced by: Fumihiko Tachiki
Moonrace; Cancer Kafka's subordinate. He thinks of her as an older sister and follows her lead in combat.

=== Ghingnham Fleet ===
Gym Ghingnham
Voiced by: Takehito Koyasu (anime), Scott Mcneil (video games)
Moonrace; leader of the armed forces of the Moon. Gym is a forceful, swaggering man who carries a katana as an affectation. He believes that humanity can only live up to its true potential during times of war, and seeks to use the Turn X to sow strife and re-kindle the brutal conflicts that raged throughout the Dark History.
Both Agrippa Maintainer and Guin Sard Rhineford think that they can use Gym to their own ends, but they fail to understand his lust for battle. Neither politician is able to control him.
Gym pilots the Concept-X 6-1-2 Turn X, a highly advanced mobile suit that was originally discovered buried on the Moon. The Turn X is suggested to be the Turn A Gundam's "brother" unit, built thousands of years ago during the Dark History era and featuring many similar technologies and abilities to the Turn A Gundam such as the same Moonlight Butterfly nanomachine system. It is also equipped with the back-mounted "Carapace" weapons platform that stores numerous handheld weapons and can separate its body into 10 pieces that can fly and attack independently. The Turn X is believed to have been built by a faction of humanity that ventured beyond the Solar System and drifted derelict in space for an unknown amount of time before returning to the Earth Sphere, being repaired and modified over time into its current form and reverse-engineered to build the Turn A Gundam.
Gym is a pilot in Dynasty Warriors: Gundam 2 as well as Turn X, making an appearance as a Playable mobile suit. Gym also pilots Musha Gundam against Loran in the final battle.
Sweatson Stero
Voiced by: Tora Uganda
Moonrace; captain of the Gingham Fleet's Mahiroo Squad. He is a proud, reckless man who breaks orders in his pursuit of the Turn A.
Merrybell Gadget
Voiced by: Rio Natsuki
Moonrace; pilot of the ancient GMIF (XM-0754) Bandit mobile suits excavated on the Moon. Merrybell is a talented but eccentric fighter who was personally trained by Gym Ghingnham. She is assigned to watch over Guin Sard Rhineford after he allies with the Ghingnham Fleet against Dianna. When the Gingham Fleet is defeated, she follows Guin into exile.

=== Agrippa Faction ===
Agrippa Maintainer
Voiced by: Hiroya Ishimaru
Moonrace; hereditary governor of the Moonrace's cryogenic stasis chambers, as well as Dianne Soreil's chancellor. When Dianna goes to Earth, Agrippa takes the opportunity to consolidate power in space and try to become King of the Moon. He plans to ship all Moonrace citizens with criminal or warlike tendencies to Earth, so as to keep the Moon free of conflict.
Meme Midgard
Voiced by: Ryuji Mizuno
Moonrace; Agrippa's secretary.
Teteth Halleh
Voiced by: Yumi Tōma
Moonrace; a spy sent to Earth by Agrippa Maintainer. Teteth is a beautiful woman who isn't afraid to use her looks to her advantage. She insinuates herself into the Earth Militia as part of a plan to assassinate Dianna Soreil. Agrippa has promised to elevate her family's social class if she carries out his directives.
Linda Halleh
Voiced by: Yumi Tōma
Moonrace;

=== Other Civilians ===
Fran Doll
Voiced by: Kumiko Watanabe
Moonrace; a teenager sent to Earth two years in advance of Dianna Counter's landing. Fran finds work at a printer's shop and becomes a war photographer once hostilities break out. She persists in documenting events even though she knows that the Luzianna government censors all of her work. While reporting on the Earth Militia, she strikes up a romantic relationship with Joseph Yaht.
Keith Laijie
Voiced by: Jun Fukuyama
Moonrace; a teenager sent to Earth two years in advance of Dianna Counter's landing. On Earth he becomes an apprentice baker. Keith struggles to keep his business neutral while war rages between Dianna Counter and the Earth Militia. His fiancée, Verlaine, is a Terran. He feels that commercial interdependence is the way towards peace.
Dona Roroi
Voiced by: Fumiko Orikasa
Moonrace; a childhood friend of Loran. She works in a fishing village on the moon, hunting for food on dolphin-back.
Hammett Roroi
Moonrace; Dona Roroi's younger brother.

== See also ==
- Turn A Gundam
