= Toho Gakuen College of Drama and Music =

Coordinates: 35°39′33.8″N 139°35′1.4″E

- 桐朋学園芸術短期大学
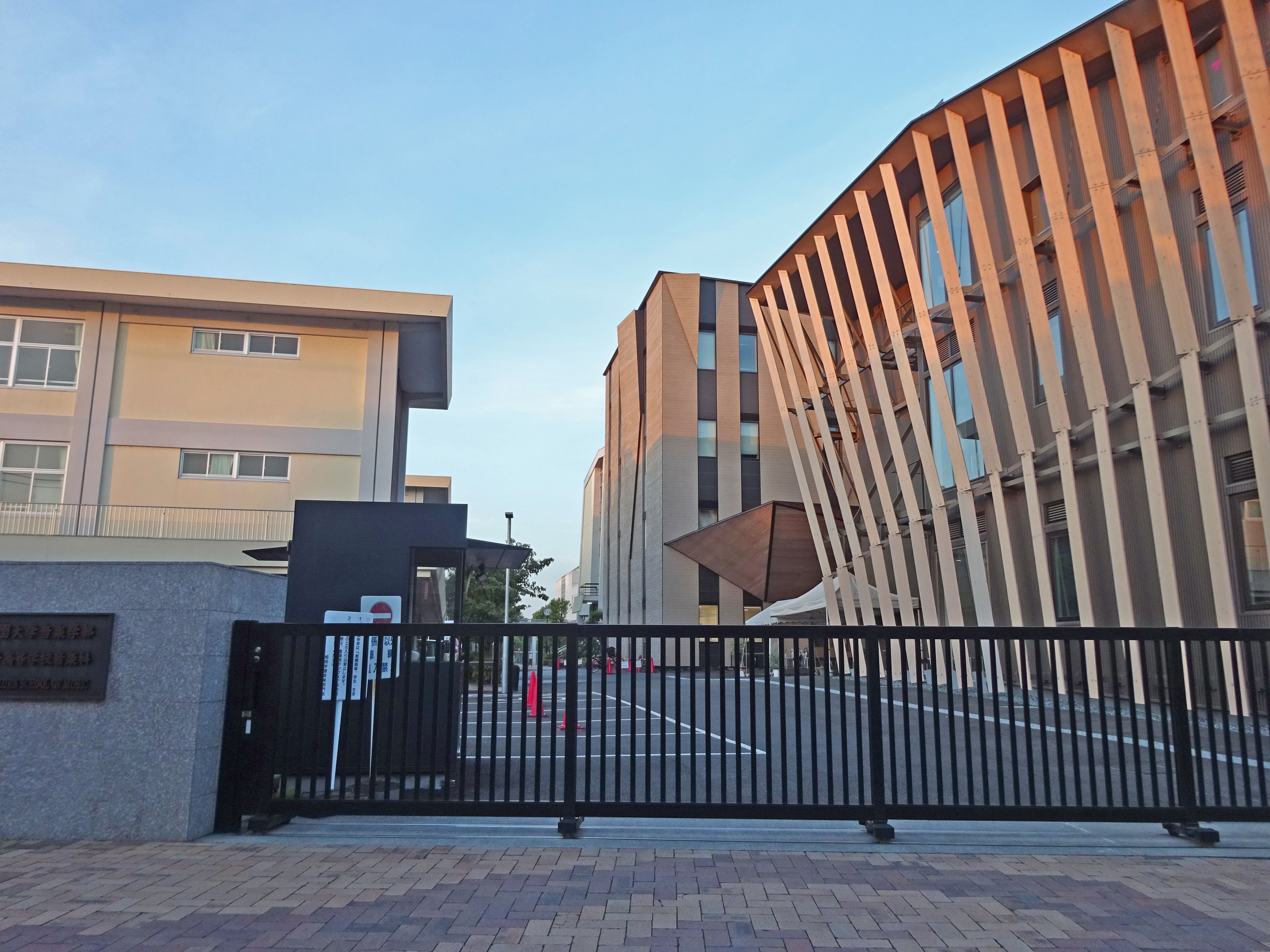
- Established: 1955
- Location: Chōfu, Tokyo, Japan
- Website: http://www.toho.ac.jp/college/index.html

Toho Gakuen College of Drama and Music (桐朋学園芸術短期大学, Tōhō Gakuen Geijutsu Tanki Daigaku) is a junior college in Chōfu, Tokyo, Japan. It was established in 1955.

== Academic departments ==
- Music
