= List of Superior Defender Gundam Force characters =

This is a list of fictional characters from Superior Defender Gundam Force.

== Neotopia ==
Neotopia, as its name implies, is a utopian city seemingly existing in Earth's future. Humanity and robots (designated Mobile Citizens) live together in harmony. In order to keep this peace, the conflict with the Dark Axis is kept secret for as long as possible. The city is protected by the Gundam Force, the robotic members of which are designated Combat Mobile Citizens. The Neotopia characters are modelled after SD Command Chronicles and the Earth Federation Mobile Suits of the Universal Century.

- Shute (シュウト)- A young boy who lives in Neotopia, Shute accidentally becomes involved in the secret war against the Dark Axis when their initial invasion attempt occurs right before his eyes. Shute is saved by Captain Gundam and, despite some initial objections from the SDG for the boy's safety, the two become fast friends and partners. It is this friendship which enables Shute to activate the Soul Drive, the mysterious core of Captain Gundam. Shute was made an honorary member of the SDG after he saved Captain and Zero from the Magna Musai. During the Gundam Force's mission to liberate Lacroa and Ark, Shute receives a backpack with boosters and a glue shooter, both modeled to look like parts of Captain's weaponry (his original booster pack and unactivated beam saber).
- Captain Gundam (キャプテンガンダム)- The first unit produced by the Super Dimensional Guard's top secret Gundam Force program, Captain Gundam is the main defender of Neotopia. Initially secretive and rigid, Captain loosens up and becomes more human via his interactions with Shute. The core of Captain Gundam is his Soul Drive, a mysterious power source which responds to emotions of others. When cheered on by Shute, Captain can use the Soul Drive to unleash his lethal Captain Punch fist attack. While Captain's standard form keeps weapons to a minimum (vulcans, missile launchers, beam saber and an optional light beam rifle and light shield), he is designed to be adaptable for various missions. Some of his other forms include:
  - Mobile Citizen Captain- When Captain wishes to journey into the world beyond the SDG headquarters Blanc Base, he adopts this simple disguise. Captain's armour and weapons are replaced with more friendlier components, his V-fin flips upside down to serve as eyebrows and his mouth guards open to reveal a human-like mouth.
  - Heavy Weapon Captain Gundam (ヘビーウェポンキャプテンガンダム)- A prototype upgrade designed after the SDG became aware of Commander Sazabi, the Heavy Weapon System adds extra fire power in the form of shoulder and backmounted missile pods, a hand-held machine gun and a much larger shield. As well as serving as a weapon system for the most dangerous of missions, the extra components enable Captain to transform into the tank-like GunVehicle mode for extra speed.
  - Captain Gundam Option V (キャプテンガンダム オプションV)- In preparation for the Gundam Force's mission to liberate Lacroa and Ark, Captain receives new equipment in the form of his Option V backpack. As well as more powerful boosters, the Option V comes with the V Rod, a double-sided beam lance. It is stored on the backpack as two equal halves, which can double as beam cannons.
- Hyper Captain Gundam- After his first battle with the Dark Axis Professor Gerbera, Captain is once again highly damaged and returned to Neotopia for repair. Rather than just repairing him, the SDG elect to give him a whole new body and GP01 Hyper Captain Gundam is born. With the Gundam Force's mission now known to the public of Neotopia, Hyper Captain Gundam's body has no need for the Mobile Citizen disguise capability. It also uses a more bold design scheme. Captain retained this form for the rest of the series. It resembles the RX-78GP01Fb Gundam Full Vernian "Zephyranthes". As with his previous body, Hyper Captain has various forms.
  - Hyper Captain Gundam Option F (ハイパーキャプテンガンダムオプションF)- The most common form of Hyper Captain. This form incorporates the dual combining beam sabers he used on his adventures across the Minov Sea and in Lacroa as well as an optional backmounted flight pack. He can also unleash an attack from his V-Fin as well as continuing to use the Captain Punch.
  - Hyper Captain Gundam Option Z (ハイパーキャプテンガンダムオプションZ)- When the final battle against the Dark Axis begins, Hyper Captain resorts to using his GP03 Option Z weapons pack. A backmounted unit with various thrusters, gatling guns and beam cannons, it is the most powerful known form of Hyper Captain. It resembles the RX-78GP03 Gundam Dendrobium Orchis.
- Gunbike (ガンバイカー)- A large, Gundam-style motorcycle intended for Captain, Gunbike houses the AI of Captain's former seasoned instructor. As dedicated to the protection of Neotopia as his student, Gunbike expects nothing but the best from his allies. He can be combined with an optional sidecar (commonly used by Shute) and boasts a pair of six missile pods. When Captain activates the Soul Drive while riding Gunbike, a dynamo system enables Gunbike to feed off this energy as well for extra speed.
- Guneagle (ガンイーグル)- The third Neotopian Gundam to appear, GunEagle is young and cocky. Admiring Captain as a hero, GunEagle is delighted when he can finally fight alongside his idol. GunEagle is specifically created to deal with aerial threats that the other Gundam Force members aren't capable of reaching. While his heart may be in the right place, he often shows off and pays the price soon after. Guneagle resembles the RX-93 ν Gundam Double Fin Funnel Type, but the fin Funnels are his wings.
- Gundiver (ガンダイバー)- Specialising in underwater combat, the team of 7 identical Gundiver brothers work together to deal with threats connected to the sea near Neotopia. Unlike GunEagle, their personalities are similar to Captain's. When all 7 units are present, they can pull off a devastating team attack. They are based on the RGZ-91 Re-GZ.
  - Gunchoppers- When the final battle against the Dark Axis begins, there is little use for the Gundivers in what is mainly an aerial conflict. The SDG quickly reconvert them to a team of aerial Gunchoppers, replacing their aquatic elements with aerial ones.
- Gunpanzer (ガンパンツァー)- After sending out the newly built Hyper Captain to help with the Gundam Force's mission in Ark, the SDG are quick to send further reinforcements. One of these is Gunpanzer: an immense armored car equipped with a mini Re-Equip Ring for Hyper Captain. In combat, Gunpanzer can transform into a more Gundam-like form, ready with cannons and missile launchers. Gunpanzer's AI is in fact that of Gunbike, eager as always to be fighting on the front lines. Gunpanzer's presence gives some much needed might to Britainmaru's forces and the two "old men" quickly become good friends.
- Chief Haro (ハロ長官)- The leader of the SDG, Chief Haro is most notable for wearing a Haro (Gundam's famous mascot robot) helmet to mask his identity. While Haro's true identity is never said in the show, many clues strongly imply he is, in fact, Shute's father, Mark (an idea that many fans now accept as canon). While Chief Haro often leads from the SDG's hidden Blanc Base, he is not afraid to get out on the battlefield himself and use his daredevil fighting style. As with all officers of the SDG, Chief Haro is dedicated to ridding all dimensions of the invading Dark Axis menace.
- Juli- An SDG operator. Juli often serves by Chief Haro's side and is a dedicated, but caring, professional. She personally oversees most of the Gundam's launches, keeping track of them from the moment they leave the catapult to when they safely return.
- Kao Lyn- 'Father' to all the Neotopian Gundams, Kao Lyn is a brilliant but slightly eccentric scientist prone to speaking in gibberish while performing martial arts moves. Kao Lyn is rightfully proud of his 'children', knowing they are a near unbeatable first line of defense for Neotopia.
- Bell Wood- A teenage prodigy, Bell Wood is in charge of providing the SDG with their own dimensional transport device to combat their enemy. In the final stages of its development, the device is accidentally damaged by Bakunetsumaru and the two spend much time arguing about this fact (Baku eager to get home, Bell stating he should have been more careful in the first place). While prone to being egotistical and self-serving, Bell Wood can be moved to serve the greater good. He ultimately never gets his device working, instead relying on the captured Zakorello Gate to fill the need.
- Mayor Margaret Gathermoon (マーガレット市長)- The talented and glamorous mayor of Neotopia, Mayor Margaret cares greatly for her citizens. Aware of the secret war, she often uses her position and quick wits to help keep the conflict secret and avoid general panic. Mayor Margaret can often be seen with paper and pencil in hand, happily sketching away an ideal view or memorable scene, both easily found in Neotopia. Her love of art is immortalised in a giant living statue of herself. The statue was briefly taken over by Zapper Zaku and the rampaging giantess nearly defeated the Gundam Force.
- Leonardo- A moustached GM serving as Mayor's assistant.
- Prio- Leonardo's human companion.
- Gundamusai (ガンダムサイ)- After the final major battle against the Dark Axis invasion squad, the SDG seizes elements of their technology. One such item is the Magna Musai battleship, which is reconverted into the Gundam-themed Gundamusai. The ship is controlled by the AI program RAIMI and serves as a flagship for the Gundam Force's mission to free Lacroa and Ark. RAIMI's name is an anagram of Mirai, a reference to Mirai Yashima, who served a similar role in Mobile Suit Gundam.
- Elmechu (エルメチュ)- Tiny mouse robots that scuttle in the dark corners of the Gundamusai. As their name implies, they resemble the MAN-08 Elmeth.
- Gunperry- SDG transport ship. While mass-produced models are black, Chief Haro owns a custom white-painted version.
- Keiko- Shute's mother and a teacher in Neotopia. While she is aware of her son's Gundam friends, Keiko doesn't know about their secret mission. Like most of the people in Neotopia, she finally discovered the truth when the Dark Axis launched a major attack on Neotopia.
- Nana- Shute's baby sister. In the vision of the future created by Zeong's massive Soul Drive, we see that she'll grow up to look like a cross between Sayla and Mayor Margaret.
- Mark- Shute's father. A musician, he spends so much time in the studio writing and recording music that he usually misses the exciting action in Neotopia... Or does he? Several clues seem to hint that Mark is really Chief Haro.
- Sayla (セーラ)- A beautiful girl that reminds Zero of the princess of Lacroa. Sayla is a bit of a ditz, often oblivious to the action going on around her and possessing an obsession for the cakes she loves to bake. Her name is an homage to original series heroine Sayla Mass.

== Dark Axis ==
Invaders from an unknown dimension, the Dark Axis seek to conquer all realities. They have a racist hatred of organic life, with hints that this is rooted in former slavery administered over them. Their forces consist of a main base which houses their leader, General Zeong, and an invasion force tasked with conquering dimensions to plunder their resources. They are modeled after SD Command Chronicles and the Zeon Mobile Suits from the Universal Century timeline.

- Zapper Zaku (ザッパーザク)- The first squad leader of the Dark Axis invasion force, armed with machine guns. He prefers to shoot first, then ask questions later. Originally, Zapper was a low-ranking officer who competed against another candidate known as Solitary Gyan for the position of squad leader. Though it seemed Zapper would lose, he manages to turn the tables when Gyan destroyed a Zako who Zapper had entrusted his machine guns to when he attempted to help Zapper. Furious over the Zako's death, Zapper took his machine guns and began frantically firing in every direction, mercilessly scrapping a terrified Gyan, who surrendered, but was murdered regardless. Impressed, Commander Sazabi granted Zapper a commander fin, although Zapper himself gave no thought to securing the promotion at the time. After Sazabi's defeat, he was captured, surrendered and drafted to the SDG as janitorial service. However, in the final battle against General Zeong, he revealed he had only pretended to be brainwashed to get revenge on Zeong for abandoning himself and his comrades before leading them in a final charge to destroy Zeong for good. After the war, he and his allies chose to remain in Ark and defend it as members of the Genki Energy Force. He resembles an AMX-011 Zaku III.
- Grappler Gouf (グラップラーグフ)- After Zapper Zaku's two defeats, Grappler Gouf was sent into battle. He is easily the most intelligent and level-headed on the invasion force trio (though he is still prone to silly antics), with ambitions to eventually take over Sazabi's position. Grappler's left arm is designed to be modular and has been shown to work as a regular arm, a deadly missile launcher and also wielding a clawed attachment. After Sazabi's defeat, he and Destroyer Dom secretly got on board the Gundamusai in an attempt to rescue Zapper Zaku. They failed and were likewise drafted. He is based on the MS-07B3 Gouf Custom.
- Destroyer Dom (デストロイヤードム)- The third squad leader sent by Commander Sazabi, a Dark Axis weapons expert. What he lacks in brains, he makes up for in pure destructive firepower. Though he speaks fluent English, his vocabulary deteriorates through the series ("Me wanna shoot BIG GUN! BOOM!"). Destroyer loves having new weapons to use and gets upset when he doesn't have any. After Sazabi's defeat, he joined Grappler in a failed attempt to rescue Zapper Zaku. He is shaped most like the MS-09F Dom Funf, but in the colours of the original MS-09 Dom. He is usually followed by a trailer full of weapons named Gallop that resembles its namesake: the Gallop-class Ground Battleship
- Zako Soldiers (ザコソルジャー)- Infantry soldiers of Dark Axis and half the size of regular robots, the Zako Soldiers make up most of the troops in Dark Axis. Despite strength in numbers, they are not too bright. Three of them host a show called the "Zako Zako Hour" to usually give insight on some events. After the failed invasion of Neotopia, the Zakos are made part of Zapper Zaku's janitorial squad on the Gundamusai. As expected, they look like tiny Zaku IIs.
- Commander Sazabi (コマンダーサザビー)- Leader of the Dark Axis invasion force, Commander Sazabi is the direct superior of Zapper, Grappler and Destroyer. Although he usually leaves fighting to those under his command, he is near undefeatable himself due to his Soul Drive. For weapons, he has a set of three beam cannons on his chest that can combine to fire a larger laser and he also has a number of smaller lasers mounted on him. He also often has a number of floating beam cannons that travel with him, which he generally uses to physically berate Zapper, Gouf and Destroyer for their blunders. In addition, he can surround himself in energy that can block his enemies' weapons while moving at a high speed. Finally, he has two beam sabers. Sazabi personally took command of the final direct attempt to invade Neotopia, a decision which led to his destruction by Captain Gundam. He resembles the MSN-04 Sazabi, his namesake. In addition, like his namesake, he was considerably larger than any other Robot at the time (being noticeably taller than Captain Gundam).
- Professor Gerbera (プロフェッサーガーベラ)- The Dark Axis' chief science officer, second-in-command and Sazabi's immediate superior, Gerbera is fiercely loyal to the goals of the Dark Axis. Despite resembling any other Dark Axis robot, this is just a disguise for Gebera's true form- Madnug (マドナッグ): a Neotopian Gundam and 'brother' unit of Captain that was flung from the future by a terrible accident. Brainwashed into believing humans are evil creatures, he attempts to sway Captain to their cause and, when this proves impossible, attempts to kill him. In their final battle, he is badly damaged and, as a final act of defiance, prepares to sacrifice himself for the rebirth of Zeong. Captain attempts to stop him, offering to return him to Neotopia. Madnug, however, cannot escape his brainwashing and jumps into a melting pit, ending his tormented life. Madnug wielded a pair of beam rifles, usually stored inside of two of his three thruster pods. The two separate weapons could combine into a singular beam rifle. He resembled the AGX-04 Gerbera Tetra in his disguise and resembled the RX-78GP04G Gundam Gerbera in his true form.
  - In the manga adaptation, Madnug's fate is slightly changed. In the final battle, he overcomes his brain washing and helps the Gundam Force. However, he is soon destroyed by one of Zeong's hand cannons.
- General Zeong (ジェネラルジオング)- The leader of the Dark Axis and the mastermind being the invasions of Ark, Lacroa and Neotopia. His gigantic body damaged/incomplete for unknown reasons, Zeong dispatches his minions to plunder other dimensions so he may be rebuilt. He is more powerful than any other single character in Neotopia, Lacroa or Ark. He is powered by a gigantic Soul Drive housed in his chest, which gives him the ability to brainwash people by playing on their darkest fears. After having successfully used this process on Madnug for years, he attempted to do this to Shute in order to rob Captain Gundam of his own Soul Drive power. The plan ultimately failed and he was taken down by the Gundam Force, using the power of the Superior Dragon (awakened by humans and robots working as one). His head survived but was taken down by Zapper, Grappler and Destroyer, working with the Gundam Force. He resembles the MSN-02 Zeong.
- Zako Red- Sazabi's right-hand man. He is later revealed be nothing more than a remote-controlled robot that the Commander used to orchestrate his master plan, as he instantly deactivated without explanation when Sazabi emerged from his transport. Resembled the MS-06S Zaku II Commander Type used by Char Aznable.
- Doga Bombers- When a serious assault is needed, the Dark Axis use powerful Doga Bombers in place of Zako Soldiers. These specialist troops are led by four dedicated commanders (Gray Doga, Yellow Doga, Blue Doga and Purple Doga) Yellow taken out off screen by gun eagle blue by Bakunetsumaru and purple by zero those Where the three who were destroyed by the Gundam Force, Grey Doga was personally wiped out by Commander Sazabi for having failed him. They all resemble MSN-03 Jagd Dogas, but with wings on their back that hold different weapons.
- BaguBagu- The tiny insect-like creatures capable of turning organic life-forms into stone. A giant version exists in Lacroa. They resemble tiny MA-05 Bigro, but green and with insect wings. During the invasion of Neotopia, Captain, by use of the Captain System and by channelling the essence of the Feather Dragon and Daishogun, was able to reverse the effects of all BaguBagu in Neotopia. These reversed BaguBagu are white, have more angelic wings, and have the Daishogun's kanji emblazoned on their foreheads.
- Magna-Musai (マグナムサイ)- The Dark Axis flagship and mobile base of operations for their invasion force. It is seemingly bigger in the inside than it would appear on the outside (much like a TARDIS). Sazabi often holds court on the outer hull. During the invasion of Neotopia, the ship transformed into the Horn of War tower. After the Horn of War was destroyed, the ship was salvaged and overhauled by the SDG. Resembles the Musai-Class Light Cruiser.
  - Komusai (コムサイ)- A small ship attached to the bottom of the Magna-Musai.
  - Komusai 2 (コムサイ2)- Yellow version of Komusai. It is capable of launching funnels that can redirect beam projectiles. Komusai 2 was defeated by Guneagle. The Gundivers tried to salvage its technology, but when it became too violent, they destroyed it. They are based on their namesake: the Komusai.
- Zakarello Gate (ザクレロゲート)- A gate that opens holes to travel between dimensions. The larger gate is called Paparello, while the small gate, which is often used as a remote to summon him is his son, Chibirello. After the destruction of Zeong, the gate returns to the dimension it came from. Resembles the MA-04X Zakrello.
- Control Horn- When a control horn is attached to a machine, the machine becomes an aggressive and violent slave of the Dark Axis. Resemble the Zock.
- Big-Zam (メガモビルタンク ビグ・ザム)- The tank/bombarder used by Zapper Zaku, Grappler Gouf and Destroyer Dom in a successful attempt to find and cripple the SDG Blanc Base headquarters. The Dark Axis have also used these in Ark, where nearly 30 of them litter an empty battlefield. These Ark deployed units had a special armour coating applied, as a reference to the Big-Zam inspired JMA27T Fantoma.

The tanks are based on the MA-08 Big Zam.

== Ark ==
Ark is a land similar to feudal Japan, populated by techno-organic Musha Gundams who are often embroiled in civil war. They are cautious of the magic practised by their neighbour Lacroa and very few of them have ever seen human life. Unlike other Gundams, Musha Gundams possess a 'GunSoul', which leaves their bodies upon death, only to reincarnate later. Musha Gundams practice a strict code of honour, violation of which is seen as a great offence. The Ark characters are modelled after SD Sengokuden and the Mobile Fighters and Mobile Suits of G Gundam.

- Bakunetsumaru (爆熱丸)- The Blazing Samurai of Ark, Bakunetsumaru is dedicated to protecting his homeland from both the forces of Kibaomaru and the Dark Axis. After being accidentally flung to Neotopia and seeing that the war is spilling even further into other dimensions, he swears to fight to protect his new home but remains vocal about his desperation to return to Ark. Bakunetsumaru's name is often a source of comedy, as those not native to Ark often forget how to say it. As a result, he is usually referred to as 'Baku' by his new friends. Baku fights with twin swords, at least one of which was given to him by the master who trained him. Using these, he can perform his destructive signature attack, the Bakunetsu Tenkyoken, which is a giant, flaming X-shaped blast. Bakunetsumaru also harbors a fear of ghosts and cannot swim. His design is a Musha-style GF13-017NJ Shining Gundam.
  - Bakushinmaru (爆心丸)- Bakushinmaru is Bakunetsumaru wearing the Baku Shin Armor, which gives extra techniques and abilities which are powered by the wearer's own life force, such as the Baku Kaitensho. The armour is destined to be worn by one noble heart musha per generation: the wearer does not choose it; it chooses the wearer. He resembles the GF13-017NJII God Gundam in this form.
- Entengo (炎天号)- Bakunetsumaru's steed. The only connection Baku has to his homeland while in his Neotopian exile, Entengo is always by his master's side. He stays in Neotopia while the Gundam Force head out to save Lacroa but is quickly sent on when the Gundams reach Ark, where he stays by his master's side once again until the end of the war. Based on Master Asia's (and eventually Domon's) horse, Fuun Saiki.
- Daishogun of Perfect Virtue (完全善大将軍)- The legendary Musha Gundam who possesses reality bending powers which he theatrically uses with a wave of his fan. Initially showing up to give Bakunetsumaru cryptic hints about the future that awaits him, it is ultimately revealed that he is in fact the adult form of Genkimaru.
  - Ship of the Golden Crest- Daishogun's personal vessel. It is capable of detecting invisible enemies.
- Genkimaru (元気丸)- The estranged son of Kibaomaru, he joined the SDG to save Ark and get revenge on his unknowing father for abandoning his mother. Despite his bratty behavior, destiny seems to have something special in mind for Genki as he possesses the ability to cut holes in the fabric of space time to allow himself and others to cross dimensions. He is also the leader of the Genki Energy Force, which protects Ark against all evil in the end of the series. It is eventually revealed that Genkimaru will become the Daishogun of Perfect Virtue.
- Ashuramaru (阿修羅丸)- Formerly Kujakumaru and a one-time friend of Bakunetsumaru, he joined Kibaomaru to gain enough power to seek revenge against Bakunetsumaru for sparing his life out of respect when he lost a duel to the Blazing Samurai. He also believes that surrender to Kibaomaru/the Dark Axis is the only way to end the civil war ravaging his homeland. Ashuramaru was later defeated in a death-duel against Bakunetsumaru, upon which he asked for his friend's forgiveness before transforming back into a GunSoul which was taken by the Dai-Shogun of Perfect Virtue. His Ashura design is based on the GF13-041NSI Ashura Gundam.
- Cobramaru (虚武羅丸)- A spy and assassin of Kibaomaru specializing in taking over castles, Cobramaru & his kin had sworn loyalty to Kibaomaru. Cobramaru is designated Cobramaru Black by his sibling teammates (Cobramaru Red, Cobramaru Yellow, Cobramaru Green and Cobramaru Blue). Cobramaru lost his Cobra hood in a battle against the Gundam Force on the Gundamusai. After being removed from Kibaomaru's service for a slew of failures, he attempted to regain his former position by stealing his family's legendary Cobramaru Black armour (which grants the wearer the power to perfectly mimic their enemies looks and most of their abilities), but was once again defeated by his enemies and the Cobramaru Black armour was destroyed. Cobramaru attempted suicide before his former master to make amends for this latest failure but was stopped by Genkimaru, who made him part of his forces.
  - The remainder of the Cobramarus were completely defeated by Bakushinmaru after they tried to assassinate Britainmaru. They resemble the GF13-030NIN Cobra Gundam.
- Kibaomaru (騎馬王丸)- The evil Warlord of Ark who joined the Dark Axis. He wields the Zanba sword, which is a long jagged blade that can perform lighting elemental attacks. Current ruler of a powerful musha clan, Kibaomaru seeks to rule Ark. He allied himself with the Dark Axis to give himself the edge in the civil war, but finds that his new allies demands sit less and less well with him. After inadvertently kidnapping Shute and the Princess, Kibaomaru requests they be put under his custody. Through his interactions with these 'strange creatures', Kibaomaru begins to show a better side. He resembles the GF13-002NGR Zeus Gundam.
  - Oshogo (王将號（おうしょうごう)- Kibaomaru's personal chariot. It is capable of flight and hitched to two mobile horses, Hiryugo and Kakuryogu.
- The Kibao Horde- A team of 4 powerful evil Musha Gundams who serve as bodyguards to Kibaomaru and protect his fortress in his absence. Despite a fierce battle, they are beaten by the Gundam Force when they attack the fortress to rescue the kidnapped Shute and Princess Rele. The two teams face off again in the final conflict of the Ark civil war with a similar result, at which point the Kibao Horde accept the Gundam Force as superior warriors. At the end of the series, they become members of Genkimaru's team.
  - Bakuhamaru (爆覇丸)- The leader and most powerful of the four, Bakuhamaru acts as Kibaomaru's right-hand man. His weapon of choice is his giant hammer, which he uses for his Bakuha Se Gaki. Resembles the GF13-001NHII Master Gundam.
  - Mokinmaru (猛禽丸)- A deft master of the blade, Mokinmaru handles a marumasa, and is capable of flight. Resembles the Gundam Heaven's Sword.
  - Kijumaru (機獣丸)- Unlike other Gundams, Kijumaru does not have conventional arms. In place of forearms are large, claw-like attachments. These, along with the drums on his back act as gun barrels for his Kiju Dai-Lasha. Resembles the Grand Gundam.
  - Haganemaru (破餓音丸)- The last of the Kibao Horde, Haganemaru manipulates two halves of a giant spiked ball. By enclosing himself with the sphere, he is able to become a spikeball and plow through his opposition, for his Hagane Dai-Koshin Resembles the Walter Gundam.
- Zakobusshi (ザコブッシ)- As part of the alliance between Kibaomaru and the Dark Axis, his new allies provide him with forces to increase his military might. For this purpose, Professor Gerbera designs the Zakobusshi which are a mix of the Zako design with Ark culture. The Zakobusshi share about the same amount of love for their cousins as the Pawn Leos and so they quickly use their superior numbers to seize control of the Zako Zako Hour once its hosts arrive in Ark. They are based on the JMS60 Busshi.
- Nobusshi (野歩士)- A sub-species of Gundam native to Ark, Nobusshi make up most of the forces fighting in the civil war. Britenmaru has two Nobusshi aids named Kinkaku (金鶴（きんかく) and Ginkaku (銀鶴（ぎんかく). They are based on the JMS71 Nobusshi.
- Britainmaru (武里天丸)- Once a great warrior and ruler of Ark, Britainmaru now possesses the strength of mind but not the strength of body to successfully fight. His Tenchijo Castle seized by Kibaomaru, Britainmaru leads his forces from a camp. Initially suspicious of Bakunetsumaru, he comes to accept the younger musha as his successor. He also forms a friendship with Gunpanzer, since they are both of similar age and mind. He is based on the GF13-003NEL John Bull Gundam and its pilot, Gentle Chapman.
- Mobile Musha Daishinshou (機動武者大神将)- A gigantic Gundam held deep within the Tenchijo Castle. Not essentially alive, it has a system similar to the Mobile Trace cockpit which enables it to mimic the move of its pilot. Kibaomaru seeks Genkimaru so that he may enter it and use it to lay siege to his enemy, but in a struggle, Genki becomes the pilot instead. Genki subsequently used it to lay siege to Kibaomaru's forces in the final battle of the Ark civil war. After departing it, Daishinshou mysteriously transformed into the Daishogun's armour and boat and flew away. Based on the Super Mode of the GF13-017NJ Shining Gundam and the GF13-001NH Kowloon Gundam.
  - Dairyogokugiken- Daishinshou's sword, about four time its height. While Daishinshou itself was kept in Tenchi Castle, the sword was stored at the foot of Mt. Anaheim. During most of the civil war, after Kibaomaru captured Tenchi Castle, Britainmaru had his army's camp directly in front of it. When Genkimaru became the pilot of Daishinshou, he used it and the sword to attack Tenchi Castle.
- Tenchijo Castle- Originally the castle of Britainmaru, it was captured by the combined forces of Kibaomaru and the Dark Axis in a battle that wasted 29 Big Zams. each tower has a different weapon, such as a huge mace, hammer, spinning blades, a claw-like crane and various cannons everywhere. It also has tank treads on the bottom, granting the Castle mobility. After the final battle with the Dark Axis, Britainnmaru reclaimed it. Its design is reminiscent of the original White Base.

== Lacroa ==
Similar to medieval Europe, Lacroa is a beautiful kingdom where magic is highly common (the exception being the Dark Hole, a large pit where only the power of spirits works). The royal family are protected by a specially selected group of Knight Gundams, prided for their skill and chivalry. Two years ago the kingdom was attacked by the Dark Axis and used as a foothold for them. The Lacroa characters are modeled after SD Gundam Gaiden and the Mobile Suits of Gundam Wing.

- Zero the Winged Knight (翼の騎士ゼロ)- A Knight Gundam sworn to protect Lacroa and its royal family, Zero was spirited away to Neotopia two years ago in the hopes he would find a way to combat the Dark Axis occupation. He ultimately hooked up with Neotopia's own Gundam defenders when the Dark Axis launched a campaign there. Flamboyant and noble, Zero sees himself as something of a gentleman and has an ego to match. He's also a sucker for women, especially damsels in distress. Like all Lacroan natives, Zero has access to a degree of magical powers which he casts with his powerful Buster Sword. He's displayed the ability to create barriers of energy, flying slashes of energy, and his signature attack, Super Magical Violet Tornado that consists of firing a gust of wind. Out of combat, he often produces magical flowers to annoy his teammate Bakunetsumaru, usually on the tip of his swords. Zero is an important figure in Lacroan mythology, which regards him as the 'Chosen One' who will save Lacroa. He is based on the XXXG-01W Wing Gundam.
  - Zero Custom, the Knight of Silver Wings (銀翼の騎士ゼロカスタム)- After nursing Fenn to full health, Zero discovers that his friend's true form is that of the powerful Feather Dragon, one of Lacroa's most powerful spirits. By merging with the matured Fenn, Zero becomes the much more powerful Zero Custom, the Knight of Silver Wings. In this form, Zero wears angel-like armour and has access to a Twin Buster Sword which can split in two. He also gains a number of powerful new attacks, strongest of which is the mighty Infinity Winds. In this form, he resembles the XXXG-00W0 Wing Gundam Zero as it appeared in Endless Waltz.
  - Fenn (フェザードラゴン)- Entrusted to Zero after a brief return to Lacroa, Fenn hatches from an egg and appears to be little more than a white/blue flying fluffball with a childish temperament. He was named after GunEagle noted the only word he could say was 'Fenn'. After a brief period of being cared for by Zero, Fenn responds to his friends feelings by growing to gigantic size. Soon after, he faces Tallgeese and his Griffin and reveals his true form- the Feather Dragon, a powerful Lacroan spirit only second to the Superior Dragon. While Fenn sacrifices himself in his first battle to save Zero, he returns to his friend while the Gundamusai travels the Minov Sea and again to help him fight against General Zeong.
- Deed, Knight of the Shining Blade (氷刃の騎士ディード)- Another Knight Gundam and Zero's best friend. When Zero showed doubt over the plan to send him away, Deed reassured his friend that the other Knights would continue to fight on and Zero's mission was just as important. Deed's true motives were in fact much darker- he had masterminded the Dark Axis invasion as a means to win the heart of the princess with whom he had fallen in love. Soon after Zero had left, Deed betrayed his 'allies' and sided with the Dark Axis under his alias of Deathscythe. His ultimate ambition was to use the power of the Superior Dragon to become human, thus allowing him to rule Lacroa as Rele's king. He also planned to obtain the power of the Dark Axis. He resembles the XXXG-01D Gundam Deathscythe.
  - Deathscythe, Knight of Darkness (闇の騎士デスサイズ)- In order to hide his identity and gain more power, Deed captured the Steel Dragon and named their merged form Deathscythe. It was under this alias that he tricked Tallgeese into forming an alliance with the Dark Axis to cause Lacroa's downfall. Usually when in this form, Deed uses the cloaking magic and appears as a floating green blob. However, as his plans near the end he de-cloaks and reveals his fearsome form to his enemies. He is based on the XXXG-01D2 Gundam Deathscythe Hell Custom.
  - Steel Dragon (スティールドラゴン)- Sibling to Fenn, the Steel Dragon is equal in power. As Fenn's features hint at his destined link with Zero, the Steel Dragon fits with Deed's 'grim reaper' look. When merged with Deed, the Steel Dragon's tail becomes a large scythe for his master. The Dragon appears to disagree with Deed's evil acts. In the middle of a battle high in the sky against Zero, he unmerges from his master and leaves Deed to fall to his death. He later cooperates with Fenn to produce a dimensional gate to send the Gundamusai on its way to Ark.
- Rock, Knight of the Hot Sands (熱砂の騎士ロック)- Leader of the Knight Gundams. A brave warrior, he urged his teammates to fight on against the invaders. He fights with a curved blade. After his death, he is melted down and his Gundanium is used in building General Zeong's body. He resembles the XXXG-01SR Gundam Sandrock.
- Battle, The Crimson Knight- Another Knight Gundam who specialises in projectile combat, mainly his 4-round crossbow. After his death, he is melted down and his Gundanium is used in building General Zeong's body. He resembled the XXXG-01H Gundam Heavyarms.
- Nataku, The Bronze Knight (青銅の騎士ナタク)- The last Knight Gundam, who appears to have an elaborate glaive weapon permanently attached to his right arm. After his death, he is melted down and his Gundanium is used in building General Zeong's body. He resembled the XXXG-01S Shenlong Gundam.
- Tallgeese, Knight of the Tempest (嵐の騎士トールギス)- Leader of the Dark Axis branch on Lacroa, Tallgeese was originally turned down to become a Knight Gundam. Through the deception of Deathscythe, Tallgeese joined the Dark Axis to take over. He could bond with the Griffin to become Griffin Tallgeese. After Tallgeese was defeated by the SDG a second time, trapped in limbo, Deathscythe managed to send him the sword of Epyon to give him safe passage back to Lacroa. However, Tallgeese was soon possessed by the spirit of Epyon & once freed from the sword was rendered powerless. He redeemed himself in the end, helping fight Deathscythe at the cost of his life. He rarely fights without using the Griffin and all that's seen of his normal abilities is that he can defeat Bakunetsumaru's Bakunetsu Tenkyoken. He, with the Griffin, is so powerful that could even easily defeat Captain Gundam, Zero and Bakunetsumaru when the three of them were working together. As his name suggested, he was patterned after the OZ-00MS2B Tallgeese III.
- Griffin- A sacred beast of Lacroa, controlled by Tallgeese. When the Epyon-possessed Tallgeese was attacked by a combination of Zero Custom's Infinity Winds and the Gundamusai's cannons, the Griffin and Epyon were dispersed into Mmns.
- Pawn Leo (ポーンリーオー)- Tallgeese's soldiers, created in his image by Deathscythe as a gift. Similar in stature to the Zakos, the Pawn Leos are even dumber. Deathscythe created them from charmed dice and they revert to this form once beaten. Unit commanders have a special head crest and Deathscythe maintains his own special Pawn Leos who have his colour scheme and stealth magic, much more powerful than the variety given to standard Pawn Leos. At one point during the Deathscythe Arc, they host their own variation of the ZakoZako Hour, dubbed the PawnPawn Hour. They resemble more ornate (and cuter) OZ-06MS Leos, and the fact that they revert to their item form very easily by so much as tripping and falling on their face is a play on the MS Leo's being easily destroyed as depicted in stock animation for Gundam W.
- Berserker Epyon (凶戦士エピオン)- The powerful Epyon sword grants the wielder the powers of any it slays. However, the sword carries a terrible curse- prolonged use of the sword opens the wielder up to possession from the evil spirit within, the demon Knight Gundam Epyon. A being of pure darkness mana, Epyon lives only to kill and cause chaos. For increased power he can transform into a two headed dragon. Based on the OZ-13MS Gundam Epyon.
- Mercurius, Knight of Thunder- An evil knight Gundam Tallgeese revived. He generates lightning for his attacks. He & his brother Vayeate were absorbed by the sword of Epyon, so it could power itself.
- Vayeate, Knight of Storm An evil knight Gundam Tallgeese revived. He summons fierce winds, shielding himself in a tornado. He & his brother Mercurius were absorbed by the sword of Epyon, so it could power itself. They were patterned off of their namesakes, the OZ-13MSX2 Mercurius and the OZ-13MSX1 Vayeate respectively.
- Relehimana Miya De Lacroa (sometimes shortened to "Princess Rele") (リリジマーナ・ミヤ・ド・ラクロア)- The princess of Lacroa, Rele was the one who tasked Zero with finding a way to save Lacroa. After many battles Zero was finally able to fulfill his duty and the princess was returned to normal. Initially a brat, Rele soon proves herself to be a capable and useful ally. She develops a crush on Shute and is eager to spend time with him. Named after Relena Peacecraft; also her full name references Relena, her voice actress Akiko Yajima, and her brother, Milliardo.
  - Fake Relehimana Miya De Lacroa- Deathscythe created her from a Princess rose in order to steal the white Bagu Bagu, but she betrayed him and developed a crush on Shute. Deathscythe reverted her back into her original form, a pale purple rose, as punishment for her betrayal.
- Noah, Doah, Coah- Brother triplets who were tasked with guarding the Spirit Egg until Lacroa's saviour arrived. Zero was the savior, but the triplets were highly suspicious of him at first until he bested Tallgeese in combat. Their mission fulfilled, the triplets turned to stone to await the day Zero achieved the final step of his journey. When the Dark Axis conflict ended, the Gundam Force met the triplets again.
- Mmn- A lower class of spirit, much lower and more common than those used by the knights. Resembling fluorescent jellyfish, Mmns are intangible and float around Lacroa.
