= List of Gundam Build Fighters characters =

This is a list of fictional characters from the Japanese anime series Gundam Build Fighters.

== Characters ==
=== Iori Hobby Shop ===
Sei Iori (イオリ・セイ, Iori Sei)
Voiced by: Mikako Komatsu (Japanese); Jessica De Borja (English)
Main Gunpla: GAT-X105B/FP Build Strike Gundam Full Package; RX-178B Build Gundam Mk-II; GAT-X105B/ST Star Build Strike Gundam; GAT-X105B/CM Build Strike Gundam Cosmos; SB-011 Star Burning Gundam
Other Gunpla: XXXG-01W Wing Gundam
Sei Iori is a 13-year-old boy whose family runs Iori Hobby Shop (イオリ模型, Iori Mokei) in the fictional Tokyo district of Keyakigaoka (けやきが丘). As his father Takeshi was first runner-up at the second Gunpla Battle World Championships, Sei is very talented at building Gunpla kits, but his piloting skills are very weak due to a subconscious desire to avoid damaging his Gunpla. Because of this, he has Reiji pilot his Gunpla while he provides navigational and tactical data during battle. He is shown to have feelings for his classmate, China Kousaka. The teamwork between Sei and Reiji gives them a competitive edge that earns them the Japan 3rd Block Championship and a shot at the 7th Gunpla Battle World Championships. The duo fight their way to the final round of the tournament, where they defeat their longtime rival Tatsuya Yuuki (a.k.a. Meijin Kawaguchi the 3rd) and become World Champions. In the very last part of the series is shown that he actually is quite skillful as a Fighter when he almost defeats Tastuya Yuuki when the battle for fun with their machines crudely repaired before the last Plavsky Particles disappear. Sei finally gains confidence in being a Gunpla Fighter himself as the defending champion one year later, to keep his promise to Reiji in becoming stronger so, when Reiji finally comes back they can battle each other in earnest.
Aria von Reiji Asuna (アリーア・フォン・レイジ・アスナ, Aria Fon Reiji Asuna)
Voiced by: Sachi Kokuryu (Japanese); Ryan Warden (English)
Main Gunpla: GAT-X105B/FP Build Strike Gundam Full Package; RX-178B Build Gundam Mk-II; GAT-X105B/ST Star Build Strike Gundam; SB-011 Star Burning Gundam
Other Gunpla: RB-79 Ball; LM312V04 Victory Gundam; GPB-X80 Beginning Gundam
Reiji (レイジ, Reiji) is a mysterious red-haired boy who befriends Sei at a park. He gives Sei an Arista, telling him he will be at his side whenever he wishes. During a Gunpla Battle between Sei and Susumu Sazaki, Reiji suddenly appears and commandeers Sei's Gunpla, giving him a surprise victory. Reiji also shows adaptability with any Gunpla, as he can defeat veteran Gunpla Fighters with just an RB-79 Ball. Despite his natural piloting abilities, Reiji has no concept of everyday life such as school or commerce. Reiji is a very outgoing person who loves to eat. He reveals himself to Sei as a prince from a country called Arian on a distant planet; one day, he stumbled upon a treasure that enables him to travel to Earth and back. Despite earning the trust of Sei and Rinko, Reiji has difficulty convincing them of Arian's existence. After winning the 7th Gunpla Battle Championships with Sei and destroying the giant Arista that produces Plavsky particles, Reiji returns to Arian. Later, he borrows Aila's Arista and comes back to Earth, just in time to help Sei in a battle against the Gunpla Mafia, and to finally have a rematch as he promised to Sei.
Rinko Iori (イオリ・リン子, Iori Rinko)
Voiced by: Kotono Mitsuishi (Japanese); Gloria Ansell (English)
Rinko Iori is Sei's vivacious mother and the current owner of Iori Hobby Shop. She often acts as a matchmaker for Sei and China.
Takeshi Iori (イオリ・タケシ, Iori Takeshi)
Voiced by: Tokuyoshi Kawashima (Japanese); Seth Leslie (English)
Gunpla: RX-78-2 Gundam; PF-78-1 Perfect Gundam
Takeshi Iori is Sei's father, who placed runner-up at the 2nd Gunpla Battle World Championships five years ago. Ten years prior to the series, Takeshi was involved in the development of the Gunpla Battle System. He left Japan to promote Gunpla Battle worldwide and entrusted his hobby shop to Rinko and Sei. Takeshi currently travels around the world as an official Gunpla Battle referee to hunt down illegal activities on the sport. A week before the final round of the world tournament, Takeshi reunites with his wife and son.
Ramba Ral (ランバ・ラル, Ranba Raru)
Voiced by: Masashi Hirose (Japanese); Dave Bridges (English)
Gunpla: MS-07B Gouf; MS-07R-35 Gouf R35
Mr. Ral (ラルさん, Raru-san) is a regular customer and local resident with an uncanny resemblance to the Zeon character from the original Mobile Suit Gundam series(down to the same voice). He is usually called "Lieutenant" by everyone but the main cast. He has a deep knowledge of Gunpla Battle and an affection for Rinko. During his spare time, Mr. Ral mentors Sei, Reiji, and China, and hangs out with veteran Gunpla Fighters at a bar. Nicknamed the "Blue Giant" (青い巨星, Aoi Kyosei), Mr. Ral appears to be very well known and respected amongst even the best of the Gunpla Building and Battling communities, though the reason as to how he gained this recognition has yet to be fully explained, it is not until the last chapter when he shows a glimpse of his true power when he and Master Chinan rushes in middle of the last fight and wipe out hundreds of enemy machines in matter of seconds, leaving the main cast astonished of how ridiculously strong they are. The only ones in-universe who do not appear to know his background are the main cast, though they still view him as a very close friend.

=== Seiho Academy ===
China Kousaka (コウサカ・チナ, Kōsaka China)
Voiced by: Yui Ishikawa (Japanese); Elizabeth Loennborn (English)
Gunpla: KUMA-03 Beargguy III
China Kousaka is Sei's classmate and a member of the school committee at Seiho Academy (私立聖鳳学園, Shiritsu Seihō Gakuen). She is also a gifted painter and a member of the school's art club. She has won the grand prize at several art shows for her paintings; the most recent of which is based on her customized Beargguy III. Her father runs Cafe Restaurant Kousaka, which is located near the school. Being a close friend of Sei, China develops an interest in Gunpla Battle. She is shown to have a crush on Sei, which everyone, including Sei himself, seems to be aware of to some extent, and she shows some joy when some believe them to be a couple, even though they have not made it official themselves. Rinko often encourages China to make the first move and confess her feelings for him, though she has yet to do so. Six years after the events of the first series, China moves to Paris to continue her art studies. Also its shown that Sei is very close hinting that they may be a couple.
Tatsuya Yuuki (ユウキ・タツヤ, Yūki Tatsuya)
Voiced by: Takuya Satō (Japanese); Mitchell Wallace (English)
Gunpla: RX-93ν ν Gundam Vrabe (GBF:A); RX-93-ν2V Hi-ν Gundam Vrabe / RX-93-ν2VA Hi-ν Gundam Vrabe Amazing (GBF:A); MS-06R-AB Zaku Amazing; PPMS-18E Kämpfer Amazing; PPGN-001 Gundam Amazing Exia; PPGN-001/DM Gundam Exia Dark Matter; MSM-07-A Amazing Z'Gok
Tatsuya Yuuki is the president of the student council and captain of the model-building club. Having won the Japan 3rd Block Championship in the previous year, he is the school's top Gunpla Fighter and Sei and Reiji's rival. His piloting skills earned him the nickname "Crimson Comet" (紅の彗星, Kurenai no Suisei). In the middle of the current Gunpla Battle Japan 3rd Block Qualifying Tournament, Tatsuya is forced to bow out of competition and take an indefinite leave from school due to a personal emergency, which centers around his involvement with Plavsky Particle System Engineering (PPSE). However, he once again faces Sei and Reiji in an unsanctioned Gunpla Battle that ends with both Gunpla destroyed. Following this battle, Tatsuya resurfaces at the 7th Gunpla Battle World Championships as the PPSE Works Fighter Meijin Kawaguchi the 3rd (三代目メイジン・カワグチ, Sandaime Meijin Kawaguchi) (Note: Meijin (名人) is Japanese for "expert" or "master". The name Meijin Kawaguchi is a nod to master Gunpla builder Katsumi Kawaguchi.), wearing sunglasses as a nod to Quattro Bajeena of Mobile Suit Zeta Gundam. As the current Meijin, Tatsuya vows to bring back the fun and enjoyment of Gunpla building, which was disregarded by his predecessor's philosophy of absolute victory. He fights his way toward the final round of the tournament, but interference and mental manipulation by Chairman Mashita hinders his chances of winning the championship, as he loses to Sei and Reiji, freeing him of his mental control, regretting that Chairman spoiled what both sides wanted to be a fun and earnest battle, leaving the result as irrelevant. Following the destruction of the giant Arista that is used to create Plavsky particles, Tatsuya battles Sei and Reiji for one last time with their crudely repaired Gunpla before the particles in the arena disappear. He gives up his moniker as Meijin and settles down as a consultant for Gunpla builders. In Gundam Build Fighters Try set seven years later is shown that he still retains the title as Meijin Kawaguchi III and have won several times the World Championship in the meantime.
Monta Gonda (ゴンダ・モンタ, Gonda Monta)
Voiced by: Kenta Miyake (Japanese); Seth Leslie (English)
Gunpla: MRC-F20 Gold Sumo; CONCEPT-X 6-1-2 Turn X
Monta Gonda is an executive member of the student council. Due to his sideburns and tall stature, he is often referred to as a "gorilla" by other students.
Akemi Ohtake (オオタケ・アケミ, Ōtake Akemi)
Voiced by: Yuka Maruyama (Japanese); Gloria Ansell (English)
Akemi Ohtake is Sei and China's classmate.
Yukari Samejima (サメジマ・ユカリ, Samejima Yukari)
Voiced by: Chisato Mori (Japanese); Jessica De Borja (English)
Yukari Samejima is Sei and China's classmate.

=== Gunpla Fighters ===
Ricardo Fellini (リカルド・フェリーニ, Rikarudo Ferīni)
Voiced by: Yuichi Nakamura (Japanese); Dave Bridges (English)
Main Gunpla: XXXG-01WF Wing Gundam Fenice; XXXG-01Wfr Gundam Fenice Rinascita; Gundam Fenice Liberta
Other Gunpla: XXXG-01W Wing Gundam
Ricardo Fellini is the reigning Italian Gunpla Battle champion. He rides a cream-colored Vespa scooter with sidecar. Prior to the 7th Gunpla Battle World Championships, Fellini acts as a coach and sparring partner for Reiji, after the boy is introduced to him by Mr. Ral, and acknowledge him as his equal in terms of skill. Nicknamed the "Italian Dandy" (イタリアの伊達男, Itaria no Dateotoko), Fellini is a playboy, and sometimes attempts to court women by offering them a Gunpla; a fault that lands him in hot water on occasion, especially at the World Tournament where the ex-boyfriends of many of the women he courted band together to take revenge against Ricardo for stealing their girlfriends. Despite his playboy easygoing attitude when it comes in terms of Gunpla Battles he is deadly serious as shown in his Tournament Qualification Match against Reiji and Sei, as he was already qualified and the boys needed to get points. He could have lost on purpose to spare his Gunpla of damage, instead his pride as Fighter drove both sides to a head-to-head match that nearly completely destroyed both machines ending the battle in a draw. Fellini makes it through the finals, but is defeated by Aila Jyrkiainen in the quarterfinals after Kirara convinces him to concede instead to selfdestructing his Fenice in an attempt to take his opponent with him as he wasn't set to lose a match. Is shown that, despite his playboy status he has reciprocated feelings for Kirara. He returns at the Gunpla Eve festival with the Wing Fenice rebuilt as the Gundam Fenice Rinascita.
Mao Yasaka (ヤサカ・マオ, Yasaka Mao)
Voiced by: Minami Fujii (Japanese); Gloria Ansell (English)
Main Gunpla: GX-9999 Gundam X Maoh; XM-X9999 Crossbone Gundam Maoh; Gundam X Jumaoh
Other Gunpla: MSA-0011 S-Gundam
Mao Yasaka is a Gunpla Fighter from Kyoto and the reigning Japan 5th Block champion. He learned his skills from the Gunpla Shingyo School (ガンプラ心形流, Ganpura Shingyō-ryū), which he hopes to inherit from Master Chinan. As his master has long feared the talents of Takeshi Iori, Mao is sent to Tokyo to challenge Takeshi's son Sei and discover the extent of the Gunpla world. Initially intent on becoming Sei's rival, the two quickly become friends, and they have high respect for each other and their skills at Gunpla building. Mao is also shown to have some sort of special secret understanding of how things work in Gunpla battles, as he is able to use his Gundam X Maoh's Hyper Satellite Cannon at will without the need of the moon-based Microwave System. Carrying no money with him, Mao uses his Gunpla collection as payment. Despite breezing through the first half of the championships undefeated, Mao is eliminated by Sei and Reiji in the first round of the final tournament. He is left heartbroken for weeks after Misaki, his love interest, slaps him before their first date for attempting to kiss her; when she returns during the Gunpla Eve festival, Mao regains his happiness.
Nils Nielsen (ニルス・ニールセン, Nirusu Nīrusen)
Voiced by: Shinnosuke Tachibana (Japanese); Mitchell Wallace (English)
Main Gunpla: Sengoku Astray Gundam; 忍ノ参 Ninpulse Gundam
Other Gunpla: MSN-00100 Hyaku Shiki; Fuunsaiki
Nils Nielsen is a 13-year-old American Gunpla Fighter and the reigning American Gunpla Champion. The son of a world-famous detective and a martial artist, Nils was given the nickname "Early Genius" (アーリージーニアス, Ārī Jīniasu) due to his three Ph.Ds in physics, as well as a black belt in karate and judo. He is also nicknamed "Samurai Boy" (サムライボーイ, Samurai Bōi) due to the traditional Japanese outfit he wears in battle. Nils participates in the Gunpla Battle tournament to unravel the secrets behind Plavsky particles, which can be used in scientific applications other than animating Gunpla. He advances through the championships undefeated, but is bested by Sei and Reiji in the second round of the final tournament. Despite his loss, he offers to help Sei and Reiji rebuild the Star Build Strike Gundam while continuing his attempt to obtain information on Plavsky particles from them. Following the aftermath of the final tournament, Nils recreates Plavsky particles aboard the International Space Station with the help of Caroline Yajima and her father's company/Nils' sponsor, Yajima Trading.
Aila Jyrkiainen (アイラ・ユルキアイネン, Aira Yurukiainen)
Voiced by: Saori Hayami (Japanese); Vicky Allington (English)
Main Gunpla: NMX-004 Qubeley Papillon; AC-01 Miss Sazabi
Other Gunpla: AMX-004G (AMX-017) Qubeley Mass Production Type; RGM-89 Jegan; SDV-04 Command Gundam
Aila Jyrkiainen is a Gunpla Fighter from Finland who was originally from the Flana Institute. Once a homeless orphan, she was recruited by Nine Barthes of the Flana Institute due to her ability to accurately predict the outcome of a Gunpla Battle by observing the movement of the Plavsky particles. Several years after her training, Aila joins "Team Nemesis" (チーム「ネメシス」, Chīmu Nemeshisu), a Gunpla Battle team that is bent on conquering the 7th Gunpla Battle World Championships. Aila becomes the reigning Finnish Gunpla Battle champion after defeating Carlos Kaiser in mere seconds. At the start of the championship tournament, she begins a rivalry with Reiji after they fight over the last meat bun at the nearby mall. Like Reiji, she has a hearty appetite. Despite slowly becoming friends with Reiji, she does not reveal her identity to him or Sei due to the special Embody suit she wears during Gunpla Battle. Due to her developing relationship with Reiji, Aila begins to doubt her abilities as a Gunpla Fighter, which forces Barthes to override her Embody suit, causing her to go berserk during her battle with Fellini. Their relationship is strained when Reiji discovers her identity under the helmet. Before the semifinal battle between the Star Build Strike Gundam and Qubeley Papillon, China gives Aila a pendant with Sei's Arista as a good luck charm. In the heat of the battle, the Aristas worn by Reiji and Aila combined with the Plavsky particles trigger a telepathic communication between them, with Reiji convincing Aila to remove her helmet and be herself. Eventually, despite rejecting the Embody system and using her own abilities, Aila loses to Reiji, but finally discovers the fun in the sport. Upon her release from Team Nemesis, she is offered a place to stay by Rinko, based on a deal given to her by Reiji. Toward the end of the series, Aila makes a wish and has herself teleported to Arian to live with Reiji. In Gundam Build Fighters Try Island Wars, it is revealed that she had a daughter with him.
Allan Adams (アラン・アダムス, Aran Adamusu)
Voiced by: Subaru Kimura (Japanese); Seth Leslie (English)
Allan Adams is an engineer who works at PPSE. He also serves as Meijin Kawaguchi's partner in Gunpla Battle, providing navigational and combat data.
Nine Barthes (ナイン・バルト, Nain Baruto)
Voiced by: Daichi Endou (Japanese); Mitchell Wallace (English)
Nein Barthes is Aila's manager from the Flana Institute. He also acts as Aila's partner in Gunpla Battle. After Aila's betrayal that costs Team Nemesis the championship, Nine partners with Chairman Mashita to co-develop PPSE's Gundam Exia Dark Matter for the final match between Meijin Kawaguchi the 3rd and Sei and Reiji.
The Renato Brothers (レナート兄弟, Renāto kyōdai)
Voiced by: Yūji Ueda (Japanese); Victor Lee (English)
Main Gunpla: RGM-79K9 GM Sniper K9
Other Gunpla: RGC-80 GM Cannon; MSM-03C Hygogg; TMF/T BuCUE Tank
The Renato Brothers are the Argentine Gunpla Battle champions, with Mario (マリオ, Mario) as the Builder and his twin brother Julio (フリオ, Furio) as the Fighter. They display complete arrogance during battle. They earn the ire of the other contestants by treating the tournament as an actual war, outfitting their Gunpla with powerful long-range weapons and using a pragmatic fighting style that ends fights as quickly as possible. The Renato Brothers advance to the final tournament undefeated, but are eliminated by Meijin Kawaguchi and Adams in the second round. In the episode 4 of Gundam Build Fighters: Battlogue, the brothers reveal themselves as triplets, not twins. Serio (セリオ, Serio) is the youngest.
Luang Dallara (ルワン・ダラーラ, Ruwan Darāra)
Voiced by: Takuya Eguchi (Japanese); Victor Lee (English)
Gunpla: ZM-D11GRB Abigorbine
Luang Dallara is the Thai Gunpla Battle champion. He is skilled enough to keep both Reiji and Mao on their toes when fighting both of them at the same time, and apparently maintaining the upper hand the entire time until they manage to escape. As a former member of the Thai national baseball team, Luang nearly defeats Sei and Reiji in their Original Weapon battle, which is set up as a baseball game, but is overwhelmed by the Star Build Strike Gundam's fastball thrown using the Radial General Purpose System. He makes it to the final tournament, only to be swiftly defeated by the Renato Brothers in the first round.
Julian Ayers Mackenzie (ジュリアン・エアーズ・マッケンジー, Jurian Eāsu Makkenjī)
Voiced by: Kanata Hongō
Gunpla: F91 Gundam F91 Imagine
Julian Mackenzie is the grandson of Sir John Ayers Mackenzie, the British Gunpla Battle champion. At the age of 15, he enrolled in the Gunpla Academy, where he mentored Tatsuya Yuuki. Three years later, when he was given the opportunity to take the title of Meijin, he left the academy because of his disagreement with the second Meijin's ideology of conquering others for victory. After the elder Mackenzie suffers a heart attack, Julian is given the responsibility to take his place in the semifinal round against Meijin Kawaguchi the 3rd, whom he loses to in an intense battle.
Rainer Cziommer (ライナー・チョマー, Rainā Chomā)
Voiced by: Nobutoshi Canna (Japanese); Victor Lee (English)
Gunpla: MS-14 Gelgoog; Gaw Attack Carrier; JMA-0530 WaDom (Walking Dome); D-50C Loto; MA-04X Zakrello
Rainer Cziommer is the German Gunpla Battle champion. He seeks revenge on Ricardo for stealing his girlfriend; however, he is constantly defeated by Ricardo throughout the tournament, eventually failing to make it in the finals. His losing streak continues at the Gunpla Eve festival at the hands of visitors in Free Battles.
Kirara (キララ)
Voiced by: Aoi Yūki (Japanese); Vicky Allington (English)
Gunpla: AGX-04 Gerbera Tetra
Kirara is an Akiba-kei idol (アキバ系アイドル, Akiba-kei aidoru) who sports twintails. Her real name is Mihoshi (ミホシ, Mihoshi) and her catchphrase is "Kiraran!" (キララン!, Kiraran!). Kirara has no interest in Gundam or Gunpla, but her agency sees Gunpla Battle as a stepping stone to her career as an idol. Because of this, she cheats her way into Gunpla Battle by paying fans to build her Gunpla and getting to know her opponents up close and personal before sabotaging their Gunpla. Despite losing to Sei and Reiji in the Japan 3rd Block Qualifying Tournament, Kirara continues to use Gunpla Battle to boost her career by becoming the host of the 7th Gunpla Battle World Championships. Ricardo begins flirting with her at a party, initially apparently working to success, though the effect he initially has on her quickly fades as Ricardo becomes drunk and begins rambling about the Gundam franchise. Nevertheless, he continues to hit on Kirara from time to time and dedicates one of his battles to her. She also grows to deeply care for Ricardo, Sei and Reji.
Caroline Yajima (ヤジマ・キャロライン, Yajima Kyarorain)
Voiced by: Chiwa Saitō (Japanese); Vicky Allington (English)
Gunpla: Knight Gundam
Caroline Yajima is the daughter of the president of Yajima Trading (ヤジマ商事, Yajima Shōji). She envies China for besting her at the local art competition every year. When she discovers that China picked up Gunpla as a hobby, she sets up an all-girl Gunpla Battle tournament and issues her a challenge. After her father's company becomes Nils' sponsor, Caroline has Nils build her a Gunpla to battle China. She ultimately loses to China in the semifinal round. Caroline returns to cheer for Nils in the final tournament, claiming that since her father's company is his sponsor, she is entitled to be his girlfriend at first and later his fiancée, much to his dismay. Toward the end of the series, Yajima Trading purchases a majority stock of PPSE. Seven years later in Gundam Build Fighters Try its shown that Nils actually married her as he now is called Nils Yajima.
Susumu Sazaki (サザキ・ススム, Sazaki Susumu)
Voiced by: Ryō Hirohashi (Japanese); Vicky Allington (English)
Gunpla: YMS-15SS Gyan; Gyan Gya Gyan; Gyan Vulcan
Susumu Sazaki is a local resident who is friends with Sei. His piloting skills in Gunpla Battle are characterized by Sei as extremely aggressive. In the semifinals of the current Gunpla Battle, Sazaki upgrades his Gyan into the Gyan Gya Gyan; however, the upgrades are not enough, as the Gunpla is eliminated by the Build Strike Gundam Full Package in the 3rd Block semi-finals. He returns during the Gunpla Eve festival, vowing to once again battle Sei and Reiji next year.
Kato (カトウ, Katō)
Voiced by: Ken Narita
Gunpla: GX-9901-DX Gundam Double X
Kato is Sei and Reiji's opponent in the final round of the Gunpla Battle Japan 3rd Block Qualifying Tournament. He cosplays as Jamil Neate from After War Gundam X, and his sunglasses drop slightly whenever he loses confidence in battle. Despite the use of 12 G-Bits, his gold-colored Gundam Double X is defeated by Sei and Reiji before he has a chance to charge his Twin Satellite Cannon.
Greco Logan (グレコ・ローガン, Gureko Rōgan)
Voiced by: Takaya Kuroda (Japanese); Ryan Warden (English)
Gunpla: OZ-00MSVa Tallgeese Valkyrie
Greco Logan is an American Gunpla Fighter and Fellini's old rival. With over 20 years in building Gunpla, Logan participated in two Gunpla Battle World Tournaments and placed among the top 16 Gunpla Fighters in the world, earning him the nickname "Raging Bull". In the American Qualifying Tournament for the 7th Gunpla Battle World Championships, Logan is defeated by Nils.
Gawain Oakley (ガウェイン・オークリー, Gawein Ookurii)
Voiced by: Shigeyuki Susaki (Japanese); Victor Lee (English)
Gunpla: JDG-09X Devil Gundam; NRX-055 Baund Doc
Gawain is a member of the Finland's Gunpla Battle team, Nemesis. He was Nemesis top Gunpla Fighter before Aila defeated his Devil Gundam with just a Jegan in an exhibition match. After being fired from Nemesis, Gawain joins the Gunpla Mafia in order to make ends meet. In Gundam Build Fighters: GM's Counterattack, he battles Fellini with his gold-plated Baund Doc, but is quickly defeated after Fellini discovers the Baund Doc's weak point.
Carlos Kaiser (カルロス・カイザー, Karulosu Kaizā)
Gunpla: NZ-333 Alpha Azieru
Carlos Kaiser is a Gunpla Fighter who proclaims himself as "King of Kaiser" (キング・オブ・カイザー, Kingu obu Kaizā). Although he is the reigning Gunpla Battle World Champion, he is swiftly defeated by Aila in the Finnish Qualifying Tournament.

=== Plavsky Particle System Engineering ===
Chairman Mashita (マシタ会長, Mashita Kaichō)
Voiced by: Tetsuo Sakaguchi (Japanese); Seth Leslie (English)
Chairman Mashita is the CEO of PPSE. Originally a petty thief in Arian, he stumbled upon Earth and made his fortune by partnering with Baker and using a giant Arista he stole from the Arian royal treasure room to produce Plavsky particles. Despite his success in founding PPSE, he is extremely distraught by Reiji's appearance in the 7th Gunpla Battle World Championships. Chairman Mashita also has a childish personality, often relying on Baker to calm him down. He is desperate to make sure Reiji loses in the championship by any means necessary because he believes that Reiji could uncover his true self as a petty thief, even though Reiji is completely oblivious to this fact. During the match between Sei and Reiji and Tatsuya a.k.a. Meijin Kawaguchi III, he goes as far as to use the Embody System joined with the giant Arista to impose his desire of ultimate victory to the Meijin; when the Meijin is defeated and released from his control, his fear of being discovered as the culprit behind the Meijin's mind control drives the Arista into a frenzy that threatens to cause a major disaster, forcing the Fighters to destroy the Arista. Following the destruction of the giant Arista, Chairman Mashita finds himself teleported back to Arian, where he and Baker set up a new business selling Gunpla there, having been humbled by his experiences on Earth.
Baker (ベイカー, Beikā)
Voiced by: Natsuki Aikawa (Japanese); Gloria Ansell (English)
Baker is Chairman Mashita's assistant. Though she is loyal to Chairman Mashita, her ideals of taking over the world with the Plavsky particle business is no interest to him, as he simply wants to be rich. After the giant Arista is destroyed by Sei and Reiji, Baker sees Chairman Mashita being teleported back to Arian and embraces him to join him.

=== Gunpla Mafia ===
C (C, Shī)
Voiced by: Daichi Endou
Gunpla: MSN-02MR Hell Zeong Marine; MSN-02GA Hell Zeong Galaxy
C is a member of the Gunpla Mafia (ガンプラマフィア, Ganpura Mafia) hired by Baker to eliminate Sei and Reiji during the seventh period of the world tournament by sinking their Star Build Strike Gundam with his Hell Zeong Marine and crushing it underwater. His plan, however, is foiled by Mr. Ral. C takes this loss personally and goes after Reiji during a Gunpla Battle simulation at a hobby shop, but he once again loses to Reiji with the help of Aila and is subsequently apprehended by Takeshi Iori for 36 counts of illicit participation in an official tournament and illegal Gunpla control.
Mikio Mashita (マシタ・ミキオ, Mashita Mikio)
Voiced by: Tetsuo Sakaguchi
Gunpla: MRXGM-009 Psycho GM; GAT-X105B/CM Build Strike Gundam Cosmos
Mikio Mashita is the boss of the Gunpla Mafia and the twin brother of former PPSE Chairman Mashita. In GM's Counterattack, he organizes a surprise attack on the new Yajima Stadium to challenge the Gunpla Fighters to a battle. After losing to Sei and Reiji, Mikio is promptly arrested by Takeshi and the Gunpla Police.
E (E, Ī)
Voiced by: Tsuguo Mogami
Gunpla: RGMGM-79 GM/GM
E is a Gunpla Mafia member who challenges Nils Nielsen. Despite his use of dozens of GM-type Gunpla, he is defeated by Nils and China, the latter dealing a surprise finishing blow to him.
J (J, Jei)
Voiced by: Kiyomitsu Mizuuchi
Gunpla: GM Z'Gok
J is a Gunpla Mafia member who challenges and is easily defeated by Meijin Kawaguchi the 3rd.
Nenene (ネネネ)
Voiced by: Saki Endō
Gunpla: Musha Gundam Mk-III
Nenene is a female member of the Gunpla Mafia who challenges Mao in GM's Counterattack. Resembling Neneka Nibrou from Mobile Suit Victory Gundam, she distracts Mao by wearing a Neneka Corps swimsuit and jiggling her breasts at his monitor while her Musha Gundam Mk-III attacks his Gundam X Jumaoh. However, she is defeated when Mao thinks about Misaki and overcomes the distraction.

=== Other characters ===
Master Chinan (珍庵師匠, Chin'an Shishō)
Voiced by: Minoru Inaba (Japanese); Ryan Warden (English)
Gunpla: GF12-035NH/GF13-001NH Kowloon Gundam; GF13-001NHII Master Gundam
Master Chinan is Mao's mentor at the Gunpla Shingyo School. Aside from having a massive Gunpla collection, he also has a gallery of figures of female characters from different Gundam series. Master Chinan cites Murrue Ramius from Mobile Suit Gundam SEED is his favorite female character. While he acts as the stereotypical of perverted oldman his knowledge of Gunpla and Martial Arts makes him a formidable opponent, as shown in the last battle when his Master Gundam uses 'it' cojoined with Ral's Gouf and crushes several hundreds of bootleg Gunplas in matter of seconds.
Team Nemesis Chairman (チーム「ネメシス」会長, Chīmu Nemeshisu Kaichō)
Voiced by: Iemasa Kayumi
Josef Kankaansyrjä (ヨセフ・カンカーンシュルヤ, Yosefu Kankānshuruya) is the private owner and chairman of the Finland's Gunpla Battle team, Nemesis who made his fortune from excavating methane hydrate.
Lucas Kankaansyrjä (ルーカス・カンカーンシュルヤ, Rūkasu Kankānshuruya)
Voiced by: Kotono Mitsuishi
Lucas is the Team Nemesis Chairman's grandson. He is promised the 7th Gunpla Battle World Championships trophy as a birthday present from the Chairman, being the main reason as why Aila is in the tournament as Lucas' grandfather is the main sponsor of the Flanagan Institute, after the Aila and Reiji match she berates Lucas saying that if he wants a trophy he should win it himself. Seven years later he returns as the Ace of Von Braum team that reaches the best 4 as an intern student after becoming the European Junior Champion revealing that his skills are now world-level and he took Aila's words to heart claiming that she was right all along.
Misaki (ミサキ)
Voiced by: Ryoko Shiraishi (Japanese); Vicky Allington (English)
Misaki is the manager of a beachfront inn. As a reward for winning the Gunpla Battle regional tournament, Sei and Reiji, along with China, Rinko, and Mr. Ral take a vacation at a beach resort. Mao also stays at the inn as champion of his region and develops a crush on Misaki. Later in the series, Misaki goes to Shizuoka to cheer for Mao in the final tournament of the 7th Gunpla Battle World Championships.
Tatsuzo (辰造, Tatsuzō)
Voiced by: Tetsu Inada (Japanese); Victor Lee (English)
Gunpla: Apsalus III
Tatsuzo is a businessman who resembles Dozle Zabi from Mobile Suit Gundam. He is a former Gunpla Builder known as "Blazing Tatsu" (灼熱のタツ, Shakunetsu no Tatsu), who disappeared from the scene three years ago. When he threatens Misaki and her mother to sell their beachfront inn to him, Sei, Reiji, and Mao issue him a Gunpla Battle challenge to save the inn from demolition. Despite the use of a heavily upgraded Apsalus III mobile armor in the battle, Tatsuzo loses to the combined efforts of Sei, Reiji, and Mao and is forced to stop harassing Misaki and her mother. At the end of the series, Tatsuzo and his mob work as helpers at the inn.
Sebastian (セバスチャン, Sebasuchan)
Voiced by: Yoshimasa Kawata
Sebastian is Caroline Yajima's butler.
Sir John Ayers Mackenzie (ジョン・エアーズ・マッケンジー, Jon Eāsu Makkenjī)
Voiced by: Masayuki Omoro
Sir John Ayers Mackenzie is the British Gunpla Battle champion. Aged 78, he is the oldest Gunpla Fighter in the current tournament. Sir Mackenzie had a prior rivalry with the second Meijin. He suffers a heart attack the night before his scheduled semifinal battle with Meijin Kawaguchi the 3rd; it is revealed later on that he faked his condition to motivate his grandson Julian into fighting the Meijin for him.

== Mecha ==
=== Iori Hobby Shop ===
GAT-X105B/FP Build Strike Gundam Full Package (ビルドストライクガンダム フルパッケージ, Birudo Sutoraiku Gandamu Furu Pakkēji)
The Build Strike Gundam is Sei Iori and Reiji's first Gunpla based on the GAT-X105 Strike Gundam from Mobile Suit Gundam SEED. It is equipped with four head-mounter vulcan guns and two beam sabers; other armament consists of a Chobham shield and a Beam Gun that can be upgraded into a Beam Rifle or an Enhanced Beam Rifle. When docked with the Build Booster (ビルドブースター, Birudo Būsutā), it becomes the "Full Package", which features an increase in performance and the addition of two Variable Speed Beam Rifles. The Build Booster also detaches to continue the battle when the Gundam sustains critical damage. The Build Strike Gundam Full Package is destroyed in its battle with the Zaku Amazing.

GAT-X105B/ST Star Build Strike Gundam (スタービルドストライクガンダム, Sutā Birudo Sutoraiku Gandamu)
The Star Build Strike Gundam is an improved version of Sei and Reiji's first Gunpla, constructed around the inner frame of the 1/144 scale Real Grade Aile Strike Gundam kit and reinforced to withstand more abuse during battle. It is equipped with a new booster system called the UB-01 Universe Booster (ユニバースブースター, Yunibāsu Būsutā). The Star Build Strike Gundam has three new features that differentiate it from other Gunpla. The first feature is the Absorb System, in which it uses the Absorb Shield (アブソーブシールド, Abusōbu Shīrudo) to consume beam-based attacks and store them as Plavsky particles. The second feature is the Discharge System, which uses the stored Plavsky particles and converts them into three special attacks: Speed, Rifle, and Aqua. Discharge Speed Mode forms "Plavsky Wings" (プラフスキーウイング, Purafusukī Uingu) that increase maneuverability and enable the Gunpla to execute an attack similar to the Turn A Gundam's "Moonlight Butterfly". Discharge Rifle Mode directs all power to the Enhanced Beam Rifle and uses the Plavsky Gate to amplify the attack into a shower of beam blasts or one giant blast. The third and final feature is the Radial General Purpose (RG) System, which reroutes all energy to the limbs or entire body for quicker response and concentrated attacks such as the Build Knuckle (ビルドナックル, Birudo Nakkuru). For its final battle with the Gundam Amazing Exia Repair, the Star Build Strike is fitted with the Gundam Fenice Rinascita's arms and the Crossbone Gundam Maoh's Crossbone Gun & Swords.
GAT-X105B/CM Build Strike Gundam Cosmos (ビルドストライクガンダムコスモス, Birudo Sutoraiku Gandamu Kosumosu)
The Build Strike Gundam Cosmos is an improved version of the Star Build Strike Gundam, used by Sei as defending champion in the Japan 3rd Block tournament of the 8th Gunpla Battle World Championships. In Gundam Build Fighters: GM's Counterattack, the Build Strike Cosmos is stolen by the Gunpla Mafia and commandeered by Mikio Mashita to challenge Sei's new Star Burning Gundam. Sei manages to recover the Build Strike Cosmos before Mikio transfers his control system to the Psycho GM.

RX-178B Build Gundam Mk-II (ビルドガンダムMk-II, Birudo Gandamu Māku Tsū)
The Build Gundam Mk-II is Sei and Reiji's second Gunpla based on the RX-178 Gundam Mk-II from Mobile Suit Zeta Gundam as a substitute for the Build Strike Gundam Full Package in the Japan 3rd Block Qualifying Tournament. Like the Build Strike Gundam, the Build Gundam Mk-II is docked with the Build Booster Mk-II (ビルドブースターMk-II, Birudo Būsutā Māku Tsū), arming it with two forearm mounted Beam Rifle Mk-II units (based on the ORX-005 Gaplant's main weapons). Following the completion of the Star Build Strike Gundam, the Build Gundam Mk-II is kept as a backup unit or for sparring matches with other Gunpla such as the Beargguy III. In the last episode it is shown that the Build Booster can dock with the Star Build Strike.
SB-011 Star Burning Gundam (スターバーニングガンダム, Sutā Bāningu Gandamu)
The Star Burning Gundam is Sei's Gunpla in GM's Counterattack. It is the predecessor of the Build Burning Gundam used by Sekai Kamiki in Gundam Build Fighters Try. Like the Build Strike Gundam, the Star Burning Gundam is powered by the RG System. When the Build Strike Cosmos is stolen by the Gunpla Mafia, Sei uses the Star Burning Gundam to battle them, eventually squaring off against the Build Strike Cosmos before finishing off the Psycho GM with the "Hyper Star Burning Knuckle" (ハイパースターバーニングナックル, Haipā Sutā Bāningu Nakkuru).
PF-78-1 Perfect Gundam (パーフェクトガンダム, Pāfekuto Gandamu)
The Perfect Gundam is Takeshi Iori's second Gunpla, based on the custom mobile suit from the manga Plamo Kyoshiro and the Mobile Suit Variation Gunpla line. It is essentially an RX-78-2 Gundam fitted with the Full-Armor System and Weapon System (FSWS) to increase its offensive and defensive capabilities. Because such an upgrade uses up more power, a propellant tank is fitted over the existing backpack.
MS-07B Gouf (グフ, Gufu)
The Gouf is Mr. Ral's Gunpla based on the Zeon mobile suit from Mobile Suit Gundam. In episode 3, Mr. Ral uses a "Best Mecha Collection" (ベストメカコレクション, Besuto Meka Korekushon) version of the Gouf while sparring with Reiji and the Build Strike Gundam; due to the old-style construction and limited articulation, as well as Mr. Ral's momentary inattentiveness, the Gouf is easily defeated in the fight. In episode 5, Mr. Ral shows off his expertly detailed High Grade (HG) Gouf at Iori Hobby Shop; however, instead of using it for Gunpla Battle, he displays it to remind Reiji of the hobbyist aspect of Gunpla.

MS-07R-35 Gouf R35 (グフR35, Gufu Āru Sanjūgo)
The Gouf R35 is a modified version of Mr. Ral's Gouf. It is equipped with two shields mounting a pair of fixed Gouf hand machine guns on the undersides, two heat swords stored in its redesigned legs, and additional vernier thrusters on its skirt armor and legs. In episode 3 of Gundam Build Fighters Try it is revealed that "R35" stands for "Ral, 35 years old."

=== Seiho Academy ===
MS-06R-AB Zaku Amazing (ザクアメイジング, Zaku Ameijingu)
The Zaku Amazing is Tatsuya Yuuki's first Gunpla based on the MS-06R-1A Zaku II High Mobility from the MSV (Mobile Suit Variation) sub-line, repainted in Char Aznable's pink and maroon colors. It is fitted with reactive armor plates taken from a tank model and equipped with a long rifle, two handguns, two Heat Nata knives, and two shoulder mounted rocket launchers. In the event of critical damage during battle, the Zaku Amazing's armor plates eject to form the Amazing Booster (アメイジングブースター, Ameijingu Būsutā). The Zaku Amazing is destroyed in its battle with the Build Strike Gundam Full Package.
KUMA-03 (Note: Kuma (熊) is Japanese for "bear".) Beargguy III (San) (ベアッガイIII(さん), Beaggai San)
The Beargguy III, also referred to as "Mr. Beargguy III", is China Kousaka's Gunpla based on the GPB-04B Beargguy from Model Suit Gunpla Builders Beginning G (itself being based on the MSN-04 Acguy from Mobile Suit Gundam), repainted in yellow with its head reshaped to resemble more of a teddy bear than the original. China envisioned Beargguy III to be a teddy bear who changed into a robot; hence the amount of cotton underneath the armor. Beargguy III is capable of shooting cotton from its mouth to entangle opponents. It is also armed with beam sabers mounted inside its mouth and arms. The ribbon on the Gunpla's back can be removed to reveal a hardpoint to mount special weapons. Seven year later, it appears that China's one-of-a-kind Beargguy III had gained enough exposure and become such an immensely popular design that it had been licensed and officially released by Bandai as a regular Gunpla kit (possibly in multiple colors), and is seen as a fairly popular Gunpla among girls and small children. It even appears to have become something of a mascot, as some of the staff working at "G-Muse" (Heavily implied to be Gundam Front Tokyo, a part of the Diver City shopping center in Odaiba) even wear Beargguy III costumes around customers.

=== PPSE ===
PPMS-18E Kämpfer Amazing (ケンプファーアメイジング, Kenpufā Ameijingu)
The Kämpfer Amazing is PPSE Works' Gunpla based on the MS-18E Kämpfer from Mobile Suit Gundam 0080: War in the Pocket and is the corporation's entry to the 7th Gunpla Battle World Championships. It was developed and built by Allan Adams of PPSE Works and is piloted by Tatsuya Yuuki under the pseudonym Meijin Kawaguchi the 3rd. The Kämpfer Amazing is armed with two or four Weapon Binders that store and eject various weapons from pistols to long range sniper rifles. The Weapon Binders also act as rocket boosters and can combine into a large beam cannon.
MS-06F Zaku II Mass Production Unit (量産型ザクII, Ryōsan-gata Zaku Tsū)
The unmanned Zaku II used in the championship battle royal is a 1/48 scale Mega Size Model (メガサイズモデル, Mega Saizu Moderu), sent in by Chairman Mashita to target the Star Build Strike Gundam. Due to its difference in scale, this Zaku II towers over all of the competing Gunpla, which are at 1/144 scale. While equipped only with its standard armament, it can crush an enemy Gunpla with one hand. Ultimately, the Zaku II is destroyed by the Star Build Strike Gundam, with the help of the Wing Gundam Fenice and Gundam X Maoh as well as unexpected assistance from the Sengoku Astray Gundam and Kämpfer Amazing.
PPGN-001 Gundam Amazing Exia (ガンダムアメイジングエクシア, Gandamu Ameijingu Ekushia)
The Gundam Amazing Exia is PPSE Works' second Gunpla based on the GN-001REII Gundam Exia Repair II from Mobile Suit Gundam 00 and developed under the code "A5". Following Meijin Kawaguchi the 3rd's battle with the Renato Brothers, Allan Adams orders the deployment of the Amazing Exia as the replacement of the Kämpfer Amazing, despite the Gunpla being 80% complete. Just like the original Gundam Exia, the Amazing Exia's special feature is the Trans-Am System that increases its capabilities threefold for a short period of time, at the expense of a significant drop of output once exhausted. Prior to the final round of the tournament, it is fitted with a Trans-Am Booster (トランザムブースター, Toranzamu Būsutā) that optimizes the Gunpla's performance in Trans-Am mode. Like the Star Build Strike Gundam, the Trans-Am Booster is a backpack that detaches from the Gunpla and transforms into a flight unit, using the GN Drive as its main fuselage. After it is heavily damaged following its defeat at the hands of the Star Build Strike Gundam in the final round of the tournament, it is repaired with several parts. Just like the GN-001RE Gundam Exia Repair from Mobile Suit Gundam 00 season 2, it sports a cloak over its left shoulder (though it retains its left arm); it also uses a stock Exia upper torso in place of its damaged unit. Further repairs are made for its final battle with the Star Build Strike Gundam using the Kämpfer Amazing's right arm, left leg armor plates, beam rifle, and beam saber.

PPGN-001 Gundam Exia Dark Matter (ガンダムエクシア ダークマター, Gandamu Ekushia Dāku Matā)
The Gundam Exia Dark Matter is an altered version of the Gundam Amazing Exia. Developed in cooperation with Nine Barthes of the Flana Institute, it incorporates the Embody System previously used in the Qubeley Papillon. Unlike the previous version, the Exia Dark Matter's Embody System uses Plavsky particles that enable Chairman Mashita to telepathically control Meijin Kawaguchi using his personal Arista. It is repainted in a red and black color scheme reminiscent of the GNY-001F Gundam Astraea Type F from the Mobile Suit Gundam 00F side-story manga, and is fitted with a winged backpack that gives it a resemblance to the ZGMF-X11A Regenerate Gundam from Mobile Suit Gundam SEED Astray R. Effectively, the Trans-Am booster becomes the Dark Matter Booster (ダークマターブースター, Dāku Matā Būsutā).

MSM-07-A Amazing Z'Gok (アメイジングズゴック, Ameijingu Zugokku)
The Amazing Z'Gok is Meijin Kawaguchi's Gunpla in GM's Counterattack, based on the MSM-07S Z'Gok from Mobile Suit Gundam. Its arms have been modified with new forearms that can transform into different weapons to give it the abilities of other Zeon marine mobile suits.
Mock (モック, Mokku)
The Mock is a series of unmanned mass-production Gunpla launched when the giant Arista forms a scale replica of the Zeon fortress A Baoa Qu over the PPSE Stadium. Their individual abilities and AI appear to be unimpressive, but their enormous numbers still make them a major obstacle. The Mock gets its name from being a "knockoff", or a bootleg of official Gunpla.

=== Gunpla Fighters (Japan) ===
GX-9999 Gundam X Maoh (ガンダムX魔王, Gandamu Ekkusu Maō)
The Gundam X Maoh (Note: Maoh (魔王, Maō) is Japanese for "devil king".) is Mao Yasaka's Gunpla based on the GX-9900 Gundam X from After War Gundam X. Unlike the original Gundam X, Mao's version can charge the Hyper Satellite Cannon through the moon-based Microwave System and/or solar power stored in the reflective panels. The Hyper Satellite Cannon also has a fast cool down rate, enabling the Gundam X Maoh to fire multiple shots. In addition, the Gundam X Maoh can use the collected solar and microwave energy to charge the beam saber into a large beam blade called the Maoh Sword (魔王剣, Maō Ken).

Gundam X Jumaoh (ガンダムX十魔王, Gandamu Ekkusu Jū Maō)
The Gundam X Jumaoh is an upgraded version of Mao's Gunpla in GM's Counterattack. It is fitted with a new backpack and armor parts.

XM-X9999 Crossbone Gundam Maoh (クロスボーン・ガンダム魔王, Kurosubōn Gandamu Maō)
The Crossbone Gundam Maoh is Mao's second Gunpla based on the XM-X1 Crossbone Gundam X-1 from Mobile Suit Crossbone Gundam. Designed to inherit the characteristics of the Gundam X Maoh, the Crossbone Gundam Maoh's Satellite Cannon is in the form of the skull on its chest.
YMS-15SS Gyan (ギャン, Gyan)
The Gyan is Susumu Sazaki's Gunpla based on the Zeon mobile suit from Mobile Suit Gundam. It has been modified for increased maneuverability during battle. The most significant change it has from the normal Gyan is that its shield has been slightly redesigned so that it can be thrown on a wire in a manner similar to a yo-yo. In addition, the Gyan is armed with the MS-14 Gelgoog's beam rifle. The letters "SS" on the Gyan's code number are Sazaki's initials. The Gyan is defeated in the Build Strike Gundam's first battle, but Sazaki rebuilds it for the Japan 3rd Block Qualifying Tournament.

YMS-15SS Gyan Gya Gyan (ギャンギャギャン, Gyan Gya Gyan)
The Gyan Gya Gyan is an upgraded version of Sazaki's Gyan for the semi-finals of the Japan 3rd Block Qualifying Tournament. It is repainted in a gold/brown color scheme and is armed with two missile shields. Despite these upgrades, the Gyan Gya Gyan is destroyed by the Build Strike Gundam Full Package.
YMS-15SS Gyan Vulcan (ギャンバルカン, Gyan Barukan)
The Gyan Vulcan is the rebuild of the Gyan Gya Gyan. Repainted back into its original purple and gray colors, it is equipped with the Valuable Pod (ヴァリュアブルポッド, Varyuaburu Poddo), a booster unit that holds two Gatling guns, two missile shields, and heavier shoulder armor that stores two beam swords. Though Sazaki defeats Monda's Turn X with its increased firepower, the Gyan Vulcan is defeated almost immediately afterward by Ricardo's new Gundam Fenice Rinascita.

Knight Gundam (騎士(ナイト)ガンダム, Naito Gandamu)
The Knight Gundam is Caroline Yajima's Gunpla based on the super deformed kit from the SD Gundam Legend BB series. Built by Nils Nielsen, the Gunpla has been repainted in a chrome metallic finish and its cape is replaced with real cloth. The Knight Gundam can transform into a centaur for increased mobility. Despite its advantages, the Knight Gundam is tangled in a ball of cotton fired from the Beargguy III's mouth and defeated via ring-out.
GF12-035NH/GF13-001NH Kowloon Gundam (クーロンガンダム, Kūron Gandamu)
The Kowloon Gundam is Master Chinan's primary Gunpla based on Master Asia's Gundam unit from Mobile Fighter G Gundam. With majority of its armor removed, the Kowloon Gundam closely resembles a Shaolin Kung Fu artist and has mobility that matches Master Chinan's martial arts skills.
GF13-001NHII Master Gundam (マスターガンダム, Masutā Gandamu)
The Master Gundam is Master Chinan's secondary Gunpla, which is also based on Master Asia's Gundam unit from Mobile Fighter G Gundam. Unlike Master Chinan's Kowloon Gundam, this Master Gundam sports less modifications, which consist mainly of gold-colored armor plates.

=== Gunpla Fighters (International) ===
XXXG-01WF Wing Gundam Fenice (ウイングガンダムフェ二ーチェ, Uingu Gandamu Fenīche)
The Wing Gundam Fenice (Note: Fenice is Italian for "phoenix".) is Ricardo Fellini's Gunpla based on the XXXG-01 Wing Gundam from Mobile Suit Gundam Wing. A Gunpla that Fellini has owned since childhood, it uses a unique asymmetrical design, moving both wings to the left side and breaking off the right side of the V-fin antenna, as well as using different shoulder and leg armor plates on each side. It also has heterochromia, wherein its left eye is green and its right eye is pink. The Wing Gundam Fenice is armed with a Beam Rapier, a Buster Rifle Custom, a Shoulder Beam Cannon and a Beam Mantle, a cape-like beam shield that gives it a matador profile. It is also equipped with a self-destruct mechanism. The Wing Gundam Fenice is also named after the Italian opera house La Fenice (which in turn Fenice is the italian word of Phoenix). During battle, it can dock with a unicycle-like support vehicle called the Meteor Hopper (メテオホッパー, Meteo Hoppā).

XXXG-01Wfr Gundam Fenice Rinascita (ガンダムフェ二ーチェリナーシタ, Gandamu Fenīche Rināshita)
The Gundam Fenice Rinascita (Note: Rinascita is Italian for "rebirth".) is a rebuild of the Wing Gundam Fenice. It now sports a symmetrical design and transforms into Bird Mode.

Gundam Fenice Liberta (ガンダムフェニーチェリベルタ, Gandamu Fenīche Riberuta)
The Gundam Fenice Liberta is a ground type variant of the Gundam Fenice Rinascita in GM's Counterattack, using parts from the Meteor Hopper. Instead of Bird Mode, it transforms into Hopper Mode. The Gundam Fenice Liberta defeats Gawain's gold-coated Baund Doc, but is incapacitated by the Build Strike Cosmos commandeered by the Gunpla Mafia.

侍ノ弐 (Note: Samurai no Nii (侍ノ弐) is Japanese for "Samurai Unit Two".) Sengoku Astray Gundam (戦国アストレイ頑駄無, Sengoku Asutorei Gandamu)
The Sengoku Astray Gundam is Nils Nielsen's Gunpla based on the MBF-P02 Gundam Astray Red Frame [Flight Unit] from Mobile Suit Gundam SEED Destiny Astray R. It incorporates a Samurai motif similar to the Musha Gundam line, armed with two Samurai Swords (サムライソード, Samurai Sōdo) and an Oni Shield (鬼の盾, Oni no Tate). The shoulder armor transforms into an extra pair of arms. The Samurai Swords have a special coating that changes the Plavsky particle band and allows them to slice through enemy beam attacks; if the coating matches the Battlefield's control particle band, the blades can cut through any defensive barrier such as a GN Field. The Sengoku Astray's final attack is the Particle Fa jin (粒子発勁, Ryūshi Hakkei), which allows it to transfer Plavsky particles into the enemy Gunpla and destroy it from within.
忍ノ参 (Note: Shinobu no San (忍ノ参) is Japanese for "Shinobi Unit Three".) Ninpulse Gundam (忍パルスガンダム, Ninparusu Gandamu)
The Ninpulse Gundam is Nils' Gunpla in GM's Counterattack, based on the ZGMF-X56S Impulse Gundam from Mobile Suit Gundam SEED Destiny. In contrast to the Sengoku Astray Gundam, the Ninpulse Gundam uses a Ninja motif.
NMX-004 Qubeley Papillon (キュべレイパピヨン, Kyuberei Papiyon)
The Qubeley Papillon (Note: Papillon is French for "butterfly".) is Team Nemesis' Gunpla based on the AMX-004 Qubeley from Mobile Suit Zeta Gundam and Mobile Suit Gundam ZZ, piloted by Aila Jyrkianen. Its main weapon is the Lancer Bit, a giant lance shaped like the Qubeley's funnel. The Qubeley Papillon is also armed with funnels molded in clear plastic, which make them invisible in battle. The Gunpla's control system is equipped with the Embody System, which takes control of Aila's mind and enhances her ability to visualize the Plavsky particles, making her an unstoppable fighter with detrimental results to her consciousness.
AC-01 Miss Sazabi (ミスサザビー, Misu Sazabī)
The Miss Sazabi is Aila's Gunpla based on the MSN-04 Sazabi from Mobile Suit Gundam: Char's Counterattack and her first one following her separation from Team Nemesis. It was built by Aila with assistance from China and Tatsuya. Aside from having a feminine figure, the Miss Sazabi is repainted in gray. Its weapons include the Sweet Sword (derived from the Sazabi's Beam Tomahawk), Sweet Shield (modified from the Sazabi's skirt armor), and foot-mounted Beam Sabers (based on the ZGMF-X19A Infinite Justice Gundam's Griffon Beam Blades).
ZM-D11GRB Abigorbine (アビゴルバイン, Abigorubain)
The Abigorbine is Luang Dallara's Gunpla based on the ZM-D11S Abigor from Mobile Suit Victory Gundam. It is repainted purple with its head reshaped to resemble the titular mecha from Aura Battler Dunbine.
RGM-79K9 GM Sniper K9 (ジムスナイパーK9, Jimu Sunaipā Kei Nain)
The GM Sniper K9 is the Renato Brothers' custom Gunpla based on the RGM-79SP GM Sniper II from Mobile Suit Gundam 0080: War in the Pocket. It becomes the brothers' main Gunpla after qualifying in the championship finals. The GM Sniper K9 is equipped with the EXAM System that enhances its performance output. Its backpack transforms into the K9 Dog Pack (K9ドッグパック, Kei Nain Doggu Pakku), a four-legged support unit that can mount any weapon as its head. In addition, the K9 Dog Pack can separate into two units; the second being a hovering APC that carries Zeon soldiers to plant bombs on the enemy Gunpla.
MSM-03C Hygogg (ハイゴッグ, Haigoggu)
The Hygogg is the Renato Brothers' Gunpla based on the Zeon mobile suit from Mobile Suit Gundam 0080: War in the Pocket. It is repainted in brown and green, similar to the colors of the regular MSM-03 Gogg. The Hygogg is briefly seen during the 2nd period battle royal.
TMF/T BuCUE Tank (バクゥタンク, Bakuu Tanku)
The BuCUE Tank is the Renato Brothers' Gunpla based on the TMF/A-802 BuCUE from Mobile Suit Gundam SEED. Unlike the regular BuCUE, this unit can transform into a tank. The BuCUE Tank defeats the Star Build Strike Gundam in the 7th period race of the world championship.
AGX-04 Gerbera Tetra (ガーベラ・テトラ, Gābera Tetora)
The Gerbera Tetra is Kirara's Gunpla based on the Zeon mobile suit from Mobile Suit Gundam 0083: Stardust Memory, built by two of her fans in exchange for personal photographs. The Gunpla has been repainted in a pink livery similar to Meer Campbell's Zaku Warrior Live Concert Version from Mobile Suit Gundam SEED Destiny. At the Gunpla Eve festival, it is shown that Kirara has built a new one by herself, and challenges Ricardo and his Gundam Fenice Rinascita to a friendly battle.
Apsalus III (アプサラスIII, Apusarasu Surī)
The Apsalus III is Tatsuzo's upgraded version of the Zeon mobile armor from Mobile Suit Gundam: The 08th MS Team. Unlike the original version, Tatsuzo's Gunpla is armed with an I-field, which deflects beam attacks. It can also fire Adzam Leaders (derived from the MAX-03 Adzam), anti-mobile suit weaponry that sprays a gas at targets and traps them with wire cages that heat up the gas surrounding them, causing the plastic of the Gunpla to go brittle.
OZ-00MSVa Tallgeese Valkyrie (トールギス・ワルキューレ, Tōrugisu Warukyūre)
The Tallgeese Valkyrie is Greco Logan's Gunpla based on the OZ-00MS Tallgeese from Mobile Suit Gundam Wing. It is repainted olive green and its vernier thruster pods have been modified to accommodate six verniers instead of the standard four. The Tallgeese Valkyrie uses the Tallgeese III's Mega Beam Cannon as its main weapon.
Gaw Attack Carrier (ガウ攻撃空母, Gau Kōge Kikūbo)
The Gaw Attack Carrier is Rainer Cziommer's Gunpla based on the Zeon aircraft from Mobile Suit Gundam. It has been modified to carry five mobile suits instead of the standard three units, and is equipped with an I-field. Cziommer sends the Gaw to ram the Wing Gundam Fenice from the ground, but it is blasted off-course by the Gundam X Maoh, sending it crashing out of the tournament.
SDV-04 Command Gundam (コマンドガンダム, Komando Gandamu)
The Command Gundam is Aila Jyrkiainen's Gunpla from the SD Gundam Legend BB series. A disguised Takeshi Iori gives her the kit when he teaches her and Reiji how to build Gunpla at a mall hobby shop near the arena. The Command Gundam features armor plates that can be easily detached. It is also armed with a beam machine gun, a missile rack, grenades, and a heat knife.
F91 Gundam F91 Imagine (ガンダムF91イマジン, Gandamu Efu Kyūjūichi Imajin)
The Gundam F91 Imagine is Julian Ayers Mackenzie's Gunpla based on the titular mobile suit from Mobile Suit Gundam F91. It is fitted with different shoulder armor and repainted in a white and orange-red livery. The F91 Imagine's special attack is the "Back Jet Stream" (バックジェットストリーム, Bakku Jetto Sutorīmu), which uses its high speed and maneuverability to create after-images of itself to confuse an opponent in battle.

=== Gunpla Mafia ===
MSN-02MR Hell Zeong Marine (ヘルジオング マリーン, Heru Jiongu Marīn)
The Hell Zeong Marine is C's Gunpla based on the MSN-02 Zeong from Mobile Suit Gundam. It is fitted with claws on its hands plus three clawed arms and four heat rod tentacles below its torso. The Hell Zeong Marine is used to sabotage the Star Build Strike Gundam's chances of winning the seventh period race by sinking it into the water, but interference by Mr. Ral sends it offline, giving the Star Build Strike Gundam time to destroy it.

MSN-02GA Hell Zeong Galaxy (ヘルジオング ギャラクシー, Heru Jiongu Gyarakushī)
The Hell Zeong Galaxy is the space version of C's Hell Zeong Marine. It is fitted with two legs that are armed with claws and mega particle cannons. C uses it during a Gunpla Battle simulation at a hobby shop to destroy Reiji's Beginning Gundam, but is once again destroyed with the help of Aila's Command Gundam.

MRXGM-009 Psycho GM (サイコジム, Saiko Jimu)
The Psycho GM is Mikio Mashita's custom giant mobile suit in GM's Counterattack, based on the MRX-009 Psycho Gundam from Mobile Suit Zeta Gundam. It is fitted with a GM head and repainted in red and white, resembling the titular mecha from Space Runaway Ideon. In addition to its standard armament, the Psycho GM can shoot Funnels from its mouth. It is also able to nullify the Plavsky particles around enemy units, rendering them immobile. The Psycho GM is destroyed by the Star Burning Gundam after Reiji reappears and energizes Sei's Gunpla with Plavsky particles from the Arista on his bracelet.
RGMGM-79 GM/GM (Jimu Jimu)
The GM/GM is E's custom Gunpla in GM's Counterattack, based on the RGM-79 GM from Mobile Suit Gundam. There are three different head variants for this unit: the standard GM, the RGM-79N GM Custom (from Mobile Suit Gundam 0083), and the FX-9900-D G-Bit D.O.M.E. (from After War Gundam X).
GM Z'Gok (ジムズゴック, Jimu Zugokku)
The GM Z'Gok is J's custom Gunpla that is a mashup of the GM/GM and parts from several Zeon marine mobile suits. It is easily destroyed by Meijin Kawaguchi the 3rd's Amazing Z'Gok.
NRX-055 Baund Doc (バウンド・ドック, Baundo Dokku)
The Baund Doc is Gawain's Gunpla in GM's Counterattack, based on the Titans mobile suit in Mobile Suit Zeta Gundam. The Gunpla is coated in gold, making it impervious to any beam attack. However, in mobile armor mode, it is vulnerable on its underside; as a result, Fellini's Gundam Fenice Liberta exploits this weak spot and destroys the Baund Doc from below.
Musha Gundam Mk-III (武者頑駄無真悪参, Musha Gandamu Māku Surī)
The Musha Gundam Mk-III is Nenene's custom SD Gunpla. While not a match for Mao's Gundam X Jumaoh, it benefits from Nenene's tactic of distracting Mao with her Shrike Team bikini. The Musha Gundam Mk-III is ultimately destroyed by the Gundam X Jumaoh's X Cannon.
