= List of Gundam Build Fighters Try characters =

This is a list of fictional characters from the Japanese anime series Gundam Build Fighters Try.

== Characters ==
=== Try Fighters ===
The Try Fighters (トライ・ファイターズ, Torai Faitāzu) are the main protagonists of the series and are based at Seiho Academy (私立聖鳳学園, Shiritsu Seihō Gakuen), the same alma mater as the core characters of the previous season. Initially the underdogs in the sport, the Try Fighters fight their way to become the West Tokyo Champions and secure a spot in the national championship.

Sekai Kamiki (カミキ・セカイ, Kamiki Sekai)
Voiced by: Kazumi Togashi (Japanese); Shiona Carson (English)
Main Gunpla: BG-011B Build Burning Gundam; TBG-011B Try Burning Gundam; KMK-B01 Kamiki Burning Gundam
Other Gunpla: MS-09 Dom; Musha Godmaru
Sekai is a second-year transfer student at Seiho Academy and a disciple of the Jigen Haoh Kenpō School (次元覇王流拳法, Jigen haō-ryū Kenpō) who has returned home after his master left to train in the Guyana Highlands. After meeting Fumina Hoshino, he learns about the existence of Gunpla, and begins to gain interest and enjoy it. Due to his exceptional fighting skills, he is seen by Mr. Ral as "the second coming of Reiji". During Gunpla battles, Sekai undergoes "assimilation" (アシムレイト, ashimireito) with his Gunpla, which makes it an extension of his martial arts skills. Consequently, this assimilation has the nocebo effect of Sekai sustaining physical injuries when his Gunpla is damaged.
Mirai Kamiki (カミキ・ミライ, Kamiki Mirai)
Voiced by: Aya Endō (Japanese); Jessica De Borja (English)
Gunpla: KUMA-F Beargguy Family; KUMA-P Beargguy Pretty
Mirai is Sekai's elder sister and legal guardian. She is also a part-time fashion model for teen magazines. She used to train in Jigen Haoh School martial arts at a young age and just like Sekai, she too can incorporate its moves in Gunpla Battle. Mirai becomes the official Gunpla Battle image character after Karin, the original candidate, steps down due to her pregnancy before the start of the national tournament.
Fumina Hoshino (ホシノ・フミナ, Hoshino Fumina)
Voiced by: Yui Makino (Japanese); Elizabeth Loennborn (English)
Gunpla: RGM-237C Powered GM Cardigan; SD-237 Winning Gundam; SD-237S Star Winning Gundam
A tomboyish third-year student at Seiho Academy and the president of the Gunpla Battle Club (ガンプラバトル部, Ganpura Batoru-bu), as well as the leader of the Try Fighters. As the sole member left after her seniors graduated and all other members moved to the Plastic Model Club, she loves Gunpla from the bottom of her heart, and begins rushing around to collect members in order to participate in the middle school section of the national tournament. Aside from Yuuma's childhood promise, Fumina's inspiration to take up Gunpla Battle is Lady Kawaguchi, a female champion from a previous tournament. She also started to develop feelings for Sekai and is jealous when seeing him close with another girl.
Yuuma Kousaka (コウサカ・ユウマ, Kōsaka Yūma)
Voiced by: Yuma Uchida (Japanese); Mitchell Wallace, Jessica De Borja (young) (English)
Main Gunpla: LGZ-91 Lightning Gundam; LGZ-91Fb Lightning Gundam Full Burnern; MSZ-006LGT Lightning Zeta Gundam; LGZ-91St Lightning Gundam Strider; PF-73-3BL Gundam Lightning Black Warrior
Other Gunpla: GW-9800 Gundam Airmaster; PF-78-3A Gundam Amazing Red Warrior
A second-year student at Seiho Academy and China Kousaka's younger brother. His skills in modeling have earned him the Grand Prix award at an artistic Gunpla contest. Growing up with Fumina Hoshino, Yuuma promised her they would enter the Gunpla Battle championships together, but he had lost interest due to a humiliating loss at the hands of Saga Adou on a tournament two years ago. Initially, he teams up with Daiki Miyaga and Eri Shinoda to battle Sekai and Fumina, but upon remembering his promise to Fumina, he betrays and helps defeat Miyaga to become the third member of the Try Fighters. Despite being a team, Yuuma and Sekai are often at odds with each other due to Sekai's inexperience with Gunpla, though Yuuma eventually accepted Sekai as the ace of their team. Yuuma has a crush on Sekai's sister, Mirai. Similar to Sekai, Yuuma is considered by Minato as "the second coming of Sei Iori."
Ramba Ral (ランバ・ラル, Ranba Raru)
Voiced by: Masashi Hirose (eps. 1-4); Katsuhisa Hōki (eps. 5-25) (Japanese); Dave Bridges (English)
Gunpla: MS-07R-35 Gouf R35; MS-09R-35 Dom R35
Returning from the previous series, Mr. Ral (ラルさん, Raru-san) is a local resident based on the Zeon character from the original Mobile Suit Gundam series. Having a deep knowledge of Gunpla Battle, Ral now acts as the Try Fighters' coach.

=== Seiho Academy ===
Mirai Kamiki (カミキ・ミライ, Kamiki Mirai)
Voiced by: Aya Endō (Japanese); Jessica De Borja (English)
Gunpla: KUMA-F Beargguy Family; KUMA-P Beargguy Pretty
Mirai is Sekai's elder sister and legal guardian. She is also a part-time fashion model for teen magazines. She used to train in Jigen Haoh School martial arts at a young age and just like Sekai, she too can incorporate its moves in Gunpla Battle. Mirai becomes the official Gunpla Battle image character after Karin, the original candidate, steps down due to her pregnancy before the start of the national tournament.
Daiki Miyaga (ミヤガ・ダイキ, Miyaga Daiki)
Voiced by: Kōji Yusa (Japanese); Victor Lee (English)
Gunpla: AEU-09T AEU Enact Custom; AEU-MA07013 Agrissa Type 13
Miyaga is the president of Seiho Academy's Plamo (Plastic Model) Club (プラモデル部, Puramoderu-bu), which has seen members migrate from the Gunpla Battle Club. He is referred to as "Praying Mantis" (カマキリ, Kamakiri) by Sekai and Fumina.
Eri Shinoda (シノダ・エリ, Shinoda Eri)
Voiced by: Ai Kayano (Japanese); Jessica De Borja (English)
Gunpla: RMS-116H Hobby Hizack
Eri is the vice president of the Plamo Club who has somewhat of a relationship with Miyaga. She develops a personality change when she removes her eyeglasses.

=== Song Dynasty Vase ===
Song Dynasty Vase (北宋（ほくそう）の壺, Hokusō no Tsubo) is the Gunpla Battle team representing Saint Odessa Girls' School (聖オデッサ学園, Sei Odessa Gakuen). The team dresses up in Zeon-inspired school uniforms. The school is named after Odessa, one of the most important battlefields of the One Year War in the Universal Century timeline. Song Dynasty Vase is a reference to M'quve's beloved antique vase; M'quve was the Zeon commander during the battle of Odessa.

Kaoruko Sazaki (サザキ・カオルコ, Sazaki Kaoruko)
Voiced by: Ryō Hirohashi (Japanese); Terri Oliver (English)
Gunpla: AMX-104GG R-Gyagya; YMS-15KRT02 Gyancelot
The leader of Song Dynasty Vase, Kaoruko Sazaki is the younger sister of Susumu Sazaki from the previous season. Her team has made the top four in the previous year's West Tokyo regional qualifiers. Upon conceding to Sekai after saving her from being sucked out of the colony in their battle stage, she falls in love with him. Gyanko sees Fumina as a rival for Sekai's attention (though he is oblivious to Gyanko's advances and both girls' feelings towards him), as well as in Gunpla Battle. She continues to assist and cheer for Team Try Fighters (Sekai in particular) throughout their run for the championship. Like Fumina, she gets jealous when seeing Sekai with other girls.
Mahiru Shigure (シグレ・マヒル, Shigure Mahiru)
Voiced by: Rinko Natsume (Japanese); Shiona Carson (English)
Gunpla: GF13-050NSW Nobel M Gundam; Impulse GM Mahiru Custom
Shigure is the purple-haired member of Song Dynasty Vase.
Keiko Sano (サノ・ケイコ, Sano Keiko)
Voiced by: Ariumi Naitō (Japanese); Jessica De Borja (English)
Gunpla: JMF1336R Rising K Gundam; Impulse GM wktk Custom
Keiko is the blue-haired member of Song Dynasty Vase.
Tateo Sazaki (サザキ・タテオ, Sazaki Tateo)
Voiced by: Ryō Hirohashi
Gunpla: YMS-15TS Gyan; HG-01 Hyper Gyanko
Gyanko's younger brother, who heavily resembles Susumu. As with his older siblings, Tateo is fond of the Gyan mobile suit, which he uses to win the Junior Course trophy in the Gunpla Builder's Contest Meijin Cup. Upon accepting his trophy, he declares Mamoru Izuna as his rival.

=== G-Master ===
G-Master (Gマスター, Jī Masutā) is the Gunpla Battle team representing Miyazato Institute (宮里学院, Miyazato Gakuen). They won the West Tokyo regional championship in the previous year.

Shunsuke Sudou (スドウ・シュンスケ, Sudō Shunsuke)
Voiced by: Takashi Ōhara (Japanese); Mike Brooks (English)
Main Gunpla: MSN-001M Mega-Shiki
Other Gunpla: AMS-129M Zee Zulu
Leader of G-Master. Years before, he lost to Susumu Sazaki in a Gunpla Battle, but he learned from that defeat by mastering his battle skills to lead his team into a regional championship. After losing the first round of the national championship that year, he realized the limits of his Gunpla building skills and commissioned Minato Sakai to build him the perfect Gunpla for the current tournament.
Yomi Sakashita (サカシタ・ヨミ, Sakashita Yomi)
Voiced by: Iori Nomizu (Japanese); Jessica De Borja (English)
Gunpla: LM312V04 Amethyst Victory Gundam
The female member of G-Master, Yomi is often annoyed by Akira Suga's womanizing attitude. She also has a tendency to talk down to her fallen opponents.
Meguta Yasu (ヤス・メグタ, Yasu Meguta)
Voiced by: Chika Anzai (Japanese); Terri Oliver (English)
Gunpla: ZZ-999 Zeo Zeong; MSN-02 Perfect Zeong
Originally the third member of G-Master, he is replaced by Akira Suga after losing in a practice battle.
Akira Suga (スガ・アキラ, Suga Akira)
Voiced by: Mitsuaki Madono (Japanese); Dave Bridges (English)
Gunpla: G-P.A.R.T.S DELTA G-Bomber, GT-9600-dV Gundam Leopard da Vinci
A student newly transferred from Gunpla Academy to Miyazato Institute who is reminiscent of Slegger Law from Mobile Suit Gundam. Nicknamed "Speedy Slegger" (迅速のスレッガー, Jinsoku no Sureggā), he was part of the team that won the previous year's Gunpla Battle World Championship. Being an experienced Gunpla Builder, he has extensive knowledge of the sport, from a Gunpla's source of assembly to an opponent's fighting style. After defeating Meguta in a practice battle, Akira becomes the third person in G-Master. Just like Sekai, Akira seems to be a practitioner of martial arts, as he also uses martial arts techniques in Gunpla Battle. Having just acquired his driver's license days before the national tournament, he wrecks his blue Volkswagen Beetle Convertible while driving Junya Inose home; because of this, Junya has a fear of Akira's driving skills.

=== Team SRSC ===
Team SRSC (Seiren Science Club) represents the Science Club of Seiren Technical College (成練高専, Seiren Kōsen) and has won numerous robotic contests – including Gunpla Battles. Because they change their Gunpla every battle, their tactics cannot be predicted by their opponents.

Daigo Ishibashi (イシバシ・ダイゴ, Ishibashi Daigo)
Voiced by: Kōki Uchiyama (Japanese); Mitchell Wallace (English)
Gunpla: RX-79[G]Ez-SR1 Gundam Ez-SR Intruder
The overseas trained ace of the Nautical Department.
Shota Nishikawa (ニシカワ・ショータ, Nishikawa Shōta)
Voiced by: Haruhisa Suzuki (Japanese); Victor Lee (English)
Gunpla: RX-79[G]Ez-SR2 Gundam Ez-SR Eliminator
A natural genius at electronic engineering.
Yukio Okamoto (オカモト・ユキオ, Okamoto Yukio)
Voiced by: Subaru Kimura (Japanese); Dave Bridges (English)
Gunpla: RX-79[G]Ez-SR3 Gundam Ez-SR Shadow Phantom
The top student in information science.

=== Team FAITH ===
Team FAITH (フェイス, Feisu) represents Joto Municipal Middle School (常冬中学, Jōtō Chūgaku). All of their Gunpla are built straight out of the box by Shimon's brother Mamoru, without any kind of customization. The team is named after FAITH (Fast Acting Integrated Tactical Headquarters), an elite division of ZAFT from Mobile Suit Gundam SEED Destiny.

Shimon Izuna (イズナ・シモン, Izuna Shimon)
Voiced by: Masakazu Nishida (Japanese); Dave Bridges (English)
Gunpla: ZGMF-X42S Destiny Gundam; ZGMF-X56S/θ Destiny Impulse Gundam
A gifted athlete who was set to become a junior high boxing champion, but he left the sport to take up Gunpla Battle after learning of his younger brother Mamoru's illness. Though he loses to Sekai, the two quickly become good friends due to their similar personalities and beliefs, and Shimon continues to assist and cheer for the Try Fighters at the national tournament.
Gorou Masuda (マスダ・ゴロウ, Masuda Gorō)
Voiced by: Yūya Murakami (Japanese); Mike Brooks (English)
Gunpla: MVF-M11C Murasame
Shimon's obese partner in Team FAITH. Despite his lack of Gunpla knowledge, he is very loyal to Shimon.
Kouji Tanioka (タニオカ・コウジ, Tanioka Kōji)
Voiced by: Shigeyuki Susaki (Japanese); Mitchell Wallace (English)
Gunpla: GAT-04+AQM/E-A4E1 Jet Windam
Like Gorou, Kouji has no knowledge in building Gunpla, but is extremely supportive of Shimon.
Mamoru Izuna (イズナ・マモル, Izuna Mamoru)
Voiced by: Miyuki Kobori (Japanese); Jessica De Borja (English)
Shimon's younger brother who is confined to the hospital. He builds Gunpla for Shimon to use in Gunpla Battles. As a child, Mamoru is a "straight builder", a person who builds models only with what is provided by the kits themselves, and does not apply any extra touches, such as painting, removing seam lines, and, judging by Shimon's High Grade Destiny Gundam's appearance, he does not even remove all of the nubs from where the parts were originally connected to their runners.

=== Celestial Sphere ===
Representing Gunpla Academy (ガンプラ学園, Ganpura Gakuen) of Shizuoka Prefecture, Celestial Sphere (ソレスタル・スフィア, Soresutaru Sufia) is the reigning Gunpla Battle World Champion and the dominant national team for six years in a row. The school was incorporated from a previous Gunpla academy that was owned by PPSE. Celestial Sphere gets its name from Celestial Being of Mobile Suit Gundam 00.

Wilfrid Kijima (キジマ・ウィルフリッド, Kijima Uirufuriddo)
Voiced by: Kenichi Suzumura (Japanese); Jesse LeNoir (English)
Gunpla: GN-9999 Transient Gundam
The team leader who is Allan Adams' nephew. Trained by veteran fighter Julian Mackenzie in England, Wilfrid aims to become the fourth Meijin.
Saga Adou (アドウ・サガ, Adō Saga)
Voiced by: Yoshimasa Hosoya (Japanese); Victor Lee (English)
Main Gunpla: RX-END Gundam The End
Other Gunpla: Cruel Gundam
Nicknamed the "Dead End Saga" (デッド・エンドのサガ, Deddo Endo no Saga), he is a veteran Gunpla Fighter who displays complete arrogance during battle. Saga is rumored to have destroyed over 1,000 Gunpla in his career. He defeated Yuuma in a Gunpla Battle two years ago, mercilessly crushing his Gunpla that caused Yuuma to quit Gunpla Battle. As Saga had injured his right wrist in the previous tournament, his teammates are concerned that he might reinjure it during the national tournament. Toward the end of the series, Saga has his wrist re-examined, and it is implied that he retires from Gunpla Battle.
Shia Kijima (キジマ・シア, Kijima Shia)
Voiced by: Saki Fujita (Japanese); Jessica De Borja (English)
Gunpla: GNW-100P Gundam Portent; GNT-0000SHIA Gundam 00 Shia Qan[T]
Wilfrid's younger sister and herself an expert Gunpla Builder. She thinks the Build Burning Gundam is "beautiful", and coaches Sekai on how to repair it. She is suspected to hold feelings for Sekai, and often offers to build Sekai a new Gunpla, which appears to be her way of expressing friendship or camaraderie, as she also offers to do the same for her teammates. By episode 25, she had finally followed through in helping Sekai make his own Gunpla: the Kamiki Burning Gundam. Both Fumina and Gyanko are highly suspicious of Shia, and they become jealous when seeing Sekai with her.
Allan Adams (アラン・アダムス, Aran Adamusu)
Voiced by: Subaru Kimura (Japanese); Seth Leslie (English)
Gunpla: CB-9696G/C/T Reversible Gundam
A former PPSE designer and coach of Tatsuya, he now coaches Celestial Sphere.
Dr. Mikawa (ミカワ博士, Mikawa Hakase)
Voiced by:
Saga's physician. During the final round of the national championship, Dr. Mikawa urges Allan to stop the match due to the strain on Saga's injured right wrist.

=== Team White Wolf ===
Team White Wolf (ホワイトウルフ, Howaito Urufu) of Gabai Institute (我梅学院, Gabai Gakuin) is the current Kagoshima Prefecture Gunpla Battle champion. They have entered the national tournament four years in a row. The team is named after Zeon ace pilot Shin Matsunaga from the Universal Century timeline.

Kenshou Matsunaga (マツナガ・ケンショウ, Matsunaga Kenshō)
Voiced by: Hiromichi Kogami (Japanese); Victor Lee (English)
Gunpla: Zaku Mánagarmr
Leader of Team White Wolf.
Minoru Koshiba (コシバ・ミノル, Koshiba Minoru)
Voiced by: Kenji Takahashi (Japanese); Mike Brooks (English)
Gunpla: Zaku Alvaldi
Yoshiki Uzuki (ウヅキ・ヨシキ, Uzuki Yoshiki)
Voiced by: Kōsuke Miyoshi (Japanese); Dave Bridges (English)
Gunpla: Zaku Kraken

=== Great K ===
Great K (グレート・K, Gurēto Kei) represents Honmoku Academy (本牧学園, Honmoku Gakuen) of Kanagawa Prefecture.

Kei Karima (カリマ・ケイ, Karima Kei)
Voiced by: Tomokazu Sugita (Japanese); Mike Brooks (English)
Main Gunpla: xvg-xxx Vagan Gear K
Other Gunpla: GN-006 Cherudim Gundam; XMA-01 Rafflesia
Leader of Great K. While he talks highly of his Gunpla Battle skills, no one around him seems to care. Even other Gunpla fighters do not recall ever battling him.

=== Team SD-R ===
Representing Toritsu Academy (統立学園, Toritsu Gakuen) of Niigata Prefecture, Team SD-R consists of identical triplets whose strategy consists mainly of collecting data from their opponents' previous matches. After being eliminated in the quarterfinals, the triplets help the Try Fighters by sending them their collected data on team Celestial Sphere.

Toshiya Shiki (シキ・トシヤ, Shiki Toshiya)
Voiced by: Ayumu Murase (Japanese); Jessica De Borja (English)
Gunpla:SDG-R1 Snibal Gundam
Leader of Team SD-R. After failing to enter Gunpla Academy, he assembles his team to exact his revenge in the national tournament.
Nobuya Shiki (シキ・ノブヤ, Shiki Nobuya)
Voiced by: Haruhisa Suzuki (Japanese); Jessica De Borja (English)
Gunpla: SDG-R2 Dragonagel Gundam
Kazuya Shiki (シキ・カズヤ, Shiki Kazuya)
Voiced by: Tomoya Kōsaka (Japanese); Jessica De Borja (English)
Gunpla: SDG-R3 Giracanon Gundam

=== Build Busters ===
Build Busters (ビルドバスターズ, Birudo Basutāzu) represent Tendaiji Academy (天大寺学園, Tendaiji Gakuen) of Osaka Prefecture.

Minato Sakai (サカイ・ミナト, Sakai Minato)
Voiced by: Kazuyuki Okitsu (Japanese); Victor Lee (English)
Main Gunpla: Saikyo Kido Gundam Tryon 3 (Riku Tryon); SF-01 Super Fumina; MSZ-008X2 ZZII; 煌黒機動 Gundam Dryon III; WF-02C Command Fumina; WF-01 Winning Fumina
Other Gunpla: Kouki Gundam
An Osaka-based master Gunpla builder and rival of Yuuma. His favorite drink is "Reiko" (iced coffee) (レイコー（アイスコーヒー）, Reikō (aisukōhī)) and he has a crush on Fumina. A disciple of the Gunpla Shingyo School (ガンプラ心形流, Ganpura Shingyō-ryū), Minato arrogantly looks down at Tokyo residents, seeing himself as a superior Gunpla Builder to them. He accuses Yuuma of running away from their rivalry and urges him to quit Gunpla Battle and concentrate on the upcoming Gunpla Builder's Contest Meijin Cup (ガンプラビルダーズコンテスト メイジン杯, Ganpura Birudāzu Kontesuto Meijin-hai) instead. Following the Try Fighters' victory at the West Tokyo qualifiers, Minato persuades Tendaiji Academy's Gunpla Battle team to accept him for a shot at Yuuma in the championships. After the Build Busters lose to the Try Fighters in the semifinals, Minato is challenged by Yuuma at the Meijin Cup, thus continuing their rivalry.
Hideo Isaka (イサカ・ヒデオ, Isaka Hideo)
Voiced by: Shōta Tanaka
Gunpla: Saikyo Kido Gundam Tryon 3 (Umi Tryon)
Leader of the Build Busters. Initially, he is reluctant to accept Minato into the team due to his numerous rejections to their invitations in the past, but he gives in after Masaki Kodera steps down as a full-time member.
Haruto Satou (サトウ・ハルト, Satō Haruto)
Voiced by: Kenta Ōkuma
Gunpla: Saikyo Kido Gundam Tryon 3 (Sora Tryon)
Masaki Kodera (コデラ・マサミ, Kodera Masaki)
Voiced by: Kōhei Amasaki
Originally the third member, he steps down to allow Minato to join the team. Masaki cheers for the team until their defeat in the semifinals.

=== Von Braun ===
Team Von Braun (フォンブラウン, Fon Buraun) represents Granada Academy (グラナダ学園, Guranada Gakuen) of Tokushima Prefecture. Both Von Braun and Granada are named after the moon cities in the Universal Century timeline.

Lucas Kankaansyrjä (ルーカス・カンカーンシュルヤ, Rūkasu Kankānshuruya)
Voiced by: Romi Park (Japanese); Elizabeth Loennborn (English)
Main Gunpla: XM-X1 Crossbone Gundam X1 Full Cloth
Other Gunpla: RGM-89 Jegan
Known as Lucas Nemesis (ルーカス・ネメシス, Rūkasu Nemeshisu), he is the undefeated European Gunpla Battle Junior Champion and grandson of the Chairman of Team Nemesis. He moves to Japan to continue his studies at Granada Academy and enter the national tournament. Lucas's team advances to the semifinals, where they are defeated by team Celestial Sphere. During the epilogue of episode 25, he is paid a visit by Wilfrid and Shia Kijima, which implies that he is recruited into Celestial Sphere as Saga Adou's replacement.
Taiki Aiba (アイバ・タイキ, Aiba Taiki)
Voiced by: Kiyotaka Furushima
Gunpla: AMS-119C1 Geara Doga [C]
Rui Tomita (トミタ・ルイ, Tomita Rui)
Voiced by: Makoto Ishii
Gunpla: AMS-119C1 Geara Doga [C]
Suriga (スリガ)
Voiced by: Takahiro Fujiwara

=== Team Titan ===
Team Titan (タイタン, Taitan) of Tenzan Academy (天山学園, Tenzan Gakuen) represents Miyagi Prefecture. It is named after the Titans, an elite Earth Federation division in Mobile Suit Zeta Gundam.

Junya Inose (イノセ・ジュンヤ, Inose Jun'ya)
Voiced by: Hiroyuki Yoshino (Japanese); Victor Lee (English)
Gunpla: NK-13J Denial Gundam
Akira Suga's former rival in Gunpla Battle. Like Sekai, Junya is a practitioner of the Jigen Haoh School martial arts. Seeing that their master would not teach him the school's ultimate technique, he abandoned the school to become a stronger fighter by mastering other fighting styles, including Gunpla Battle, but becoming ruthless and cruel. He joins Tenzan Academy's team in the national tournament, confronting Team Try Fighters in the quarterfinals and challenging Sekai in a one on one match. After being defeated, Junya sees the errors of his ways and reconciles with Sekai, departing to keep improving himself as a martial artist and returning to his master.
Takuya Tajima (タジマ・タクヤ, Tajima Takuya)
Voiced by: Jun Konno
Gunpla: GNY-003CL Gundam Abulhool Plus
Hikaru Narita (ナリタ・ヒカル, Narita Hikaru)
Voiced by: Kōzō Mito
Gunpla: LM111E03+SD-VB03A Gundash Blastor

=== Renato Team ===
Renato Team (レナート小隊, Renāto Shōtai) is a team featured in episode 4 of Gundam Build Fighters: Battlogue. The team consists of former Argentine Gunpla Battle Champions Mario and Julio Renato and their younger brother Serio.

Mario Renato (マリオ・レナート, Mario Renāto)
Voiced by: Yūji Ueda
Gunpla: Striker GN-X
Julio Renato (フリオ・レナート, Furio Renāto)
Voiced by: Yūji Ueda
Gunpla: GNX-803T GN-XIV Type.GBF
Serio Renato (セリオ・レナート, Serio Renāto)
Voiced by: Yūji Ueda
Gunpla: GNX-803T GN-XIV Type.GBF

=== Yajima Trading ===
Yajima Trading (ヤジマ商事, Yajima Shōji) is the current owner of the Gunpla Battle system, having acquired all of PPSE's assets following the end of the 7th Gunpla Battle World Championship. The company owns Yajima Stadium (ヤジマスタジアム, Yajima Sutajiamu), the host of the Gunpla Battle championships and successor to the now demolished PPSE Stadium. Adjacent to the stadium is the PPSE Stadium Monument, honoring the Gunpla Fighters who saved Tokyo from the giant Arista, a Plavsky particle crystal that had reached critical mass at the end of the 7th Gunpla Battle World Championships.

Tatsuya Yuuki (ユウキ・タツヤ, Yūki Tatsuya)
Voiced by: Takuya Satō (Japanese); Mitchell Wallace (English)
Main Gunpla: PF-78-3A Gundam Amazing Red Warrior; MS-06R-AB Zaku Amazing; MS-06S-BL Ballistic Zaku; amazon.co.jp A-Z Gundam
Other Gunpla: LGZ-91 Lightning Gundam
Known as Meijin Kawaguchi III (三代目メイジン・カワグチ, Sandaime Meijin Kawaguchi), he has gone on to become Gunpla Battle World Champion three times in a row and Hall of Fame member. He returns with Lady Kawaguchi as spectators in the qualifying tournament before involving himself with the Try Fighters.
Lady Kawaguchi (レディ・カワグチ, Redi Kawaguchi)
Voiced by: Kanako Tōjō (Japanese); Terri Oliver (English)
Gunpla: GSX-401FW Stargazer; Devil Dragon Blade Zero Gundam; PPMS-18E Kämpfer Amazing; SD-9071A "Kurenai Musha" Red Warrior Amazing
A Gunpla fighter sponsored by Yajima Trading, she won a tournament several years back. Idolized by Fumina, she is the only female Gunpla fighter to be given the prestigious name "Kawaguchi".
Nils Yajima (ヤジマ・ニルス, Yajima Nirusu)
Voiced by: Shinnosuke Tachibana (Japanese); Mitchell Wallace (English)
The former American Gunpla Battle Champion, Nils is now a chief engineer at Yajima Trading, having rediscovered Plavsky particles after the 7th Gunpla Battle Championship. He is also married to Caroline Yajima and has taken her surname as his.

=== Others ===
China Kousaka (コウサカ・チナ, Kōsaka China)
Voiced by: Yui Ishikawa (Japanese); Elizabeth Loennborn (English)
Yuuma's elder sister. She currently lives in France, where she is mastering her art skills. In episode 18, she briefly returns to Japan to deliver the original Build Burning Gundam's spare parts to Yuuma to repair the Try Burning Gundam before flying back to France.
Sei Iori (イオリ・セイ, Iori Sei)
Voiced by: Mikako Komatsu (Battlogue)
Gunpla: Build Strike Galaxy Cosmos
The former Gunpla Battle World Champion and creator of the Build Burning Gundam. Sei currently lives with China in France. He has China deliver the Gunpla's spare parts to the Try Fighters and hopes to battle Sekai someday.
Marika Hoshino (ホシノ・マリカ, Hoshino Marika)
Voiced by: Hitomi Nabatame (Japanese); Terri Oliver (English)
Fumina's mother.
Taku (タク)
Voiced by: Hirofumi Nojima (Japanese); Terri Oliver (English)
Gunpla: WD-M01 ∀ Gundam (Taku Custom)
Lead vocalist of the rock band SGOCK III (3代目スゴック, Sandaime Sugokku) and a hardcore Gundam fan. He will do whatever it takes to win, such as promising other women to go on a date with him.
Hibiki (ヒビキ)
Voiced by: Miki Nagasawa (Japanese); Jesse LeNoir (English)
Mirai's talent agency manager.
Mihoshi (ミホシ)
Formerly known as Kirara (キララ), the Gunpla Idol is now a famous celebrity in Hollywood.
Karin (カリン)
Voiced by:
Gunpla: MS-05B Zaku I
A model affiliated with DR Production. Karin is also the mother of a son, whom she says loves Gunpla. After winning the Tokyo Gunpla Collection battle, Karin is chosen as the Gunpla Battle Championship's image character, however, when she realizes that she is pregnant with another child, she is forced to resign from that position and give it to Mirai. In the epilogue, it is shown that she gave birth to a daughter.
"Domon Kasshu" ("ドモン・カッシュ")
A man who heavily resembles the main protagonist of Mobile Fighter G Gundam who is revealed in episode 25 to be the master of the Jigen Haoh Kenpō School.
Satomi Funaki (フナキ・サトミ, Funaki Satomi)
Voiced by: Chika Anzai
Gunpla: Petit'gguy ChaChaCha Brown
Mirai's modeling partner.
Mysterious Girl (謎の少女, Nazo no Shōjo)
Voiced by: Ayane Sakura
A mysterious purple-haired girl who appears in Gundam Build Fighters Try Island Wars. She wanders around the island and befriends Sekai. Later, all of the Gunpla Fighters discover that she is the cause of the Plavsky particles going out of control on the island because of her hairpin. She explains that she wants her own Gunpla, but she does not know how to build one, so the Try Fighters teach her how to build a Petit'gguy before she disappears before their eyes, leading them to believe that she is a ghost. In the end, it is revealed that she is the daughter of Aila Jyrkiainen and Aria von Reiji Asuna.
Aila Jyrkiainen (アイラ・ユルキアイネン, Aira Yurukiainen)
Voiced by: Saori Hayami
Aila makes a cameo appearance in Gundam Build Fighters Try Island Wars. She is revealed to have married Reiji and the mother of the mysterious girl, who returns to Arian after her adventure with the Gunpla Fighters.
Char Aznable (シャア・アズナブル, Shā Azunaburu)
Voiced by: Toshihiko Seki
Gunpla: MS-06S-BL Ballistic Zaku
Char makes an appearance in Gundam Build Fighters Battlogue as an AI pilot in Allan Adams' upgrade of the Gunpla Battle System.
Ribbons Almark (リボンズ・アルマーク, Ribonzu Arumāku)
Voiced by: Noboru Sōgetsu
Gunpla: CB-9696G/C/T Reversible Gundam
Ribbons makes an appearance in Gundam Build Fighters Battlogue as the default AI pilot of the Reversible Gundam. He initially confuses Char with his voice, as it is similar to that of Char's rival Amuro Ray. Despite his extraordinary abilities as an Innovator, Ribbons is bested by Char during battle.
Amuro Ray (アムロ・レイ, Amuro Rei)
Voiced by: Tōru Furuya
Gunpla: CB-9696G/C/T Reversible Gundam
In Gundam Build Fighters Battlogue, Allan changes the Reversible Gundam's AI from Ribbons Almark to Amuro Ray. When asked by Char why he and Ribbons have a similar voice, Amuro says it is only coincidental. Both AI pilots push their Gunpla to their full potential until they destroy each other, resulting in a draw.

== Mecha ==
=== Try Fighters ===
BG-011B Build Burning Gundam (ビルドバーニングガンダム, Birudo Bāningu Gandamu)
Sekai Kamiki's Gunpla, which is built exclusively for unarmed melee combat. First revealed inside Sekai's destroyed MS-09 Dom during his first Gunpla Battle, the Build Burning Gundam is an improved version of a Gunpla built and entered by Sei Iori during the 11th World Tournament. It possesses a similar system to the Star Build Strike Gundam's Radial General Purpose (RG) System that gives it incredible offensive and defensive power. The overall clear blue parts glow in a burning red color and create flames by manipulating Plavsky particles, allowing Sekai to make use of his Jigen Haoh school martial arts techniques such as the Seiken-Zuki (聖拳突き（せいけんづき）), Seisō-Geri (聖槍蹴り（せいそうげり）), Shippū-Zuki (疾風突き（しっぷうづき）), Sōtenguren-Ken (蒼天紅蓮拳（そうてんぐれんけん）), Senpū Tatsumaki-Geri (旋風竜巻蹴り（せんぷうたつまきげり）), Ryūsei Rasen-Ken (流星螺旋拳（りゅうせいらせんけん）), Dangan Hagan-Ken (弾丸破岩拳（だんがんはがんけん）), Senkō Majutsu-Geri (閃光魔術蹴り(せんこうまじゅつげり)), and Hadō Reppaku-Ken ((はどうれっぱくけん)). When the Build Burning Gundam and its fighter are both in peak condition, additional fire effects will burst out from its back. During its battle with Wilfrid Kijima's Transient Gundam in episode 13, the Build Burning Gundam executes a Phoenix-like attack that destroys the moon in the playing field before its arms are shattered by the excessive strain of the Plavsky particle emission. It is here that the Try Fighters realize that Sekai's assimilation with the Build Burning Gundam has far exceeded the Gunpla's capabilities; thus the need for an upgrade. Originally built by Sei as a memory of his promised battle with his friend Reiji, having his fighting style in mind, Sei eventually entrusts the Gunpla to Sekai upon seeing how similar they are, to the point of providing spare parts for maintenance.

TBG-011B Try Burning Gundam (トライバーニングガンダム, Torai Bāningu Gandamu)
Sekai's upgraded Build Burning Gundam used in the National Tournament. It is redesigned and redone from the ground up, with reinforced armor parts and clear parts for better emission. It is also equipped with a new system called Burning Burst System (バーニングバーストシステム, Bāningu Bāsuto Shisutemu), designed by Yuuma Kousaka to maximize the Plavsky particle emission but speeds up the assimilation process to Sekai, causing a Nocebo effect when getting hit or damaged. Like the original Build Burning, the Try Burning also excels in close combat. During the final round in episode 24, both the Try Burning Gundam and Transient Gundam inflict severe damage on each other until the end of the time limit. Thanks to some extensive modifications to the polycap layout by Yuuma and Minato, the Try Burning Gundam is repaired with parts from the Lightning Gundam Full Burnern and Star Winning Gundam.

KMK-B01 Kamiki Burning Gundam (カミキバーニングガンダム, Kamiki Bāningu Gandamu)
Sekai's own original Gunpla, based on the Build Burning Gundam. He crafts this Gunpla during his secret training with Shia Kijima. Unlike the Build Burning Gundam, the Kamiki Burning Gundam is armed with a sword and the clear blue parts do not change color when it reaches Burning Burst mode.
LGZ-91 Lightning Gundam (ライトニングガンダム, Raitoningu Gandamu)
Based on the RGZ-91 Re-GZ from Mobile Suit Gundam: Char's Counterattack, this is Yuuma Kousaka's Gunpla. It is equipped with the Lightning Back Weapon System (ライトニングバックウェポンシステム, Raitoningu Bakku Uepon Shisutemu), a support unit that docks with it for high speed maneuverability. This Gunpla specializes in long-range shooting.

LGZ-91Fb Lightning Gundam Full Burnern (ライトニングガンダム フルバーニアン, Raitoningu Gandamu Furu Bānian)
Yuuma upgrades his Lightning Gundam with the new Lightning Back Weapon System Mk-II (ライトニングバックウェポンシステムMk-II, Raitoningu Bakku Uepon Shisutemu Māku Tsū), which adds more vernier thrusters for better maneuverability that far exceeds the Trans-Am mode of Mobile Suit Gundam 00-based Gunpla. The upgraded Gunpla is named after the RX-78GP01-Fb Gundam "Zephyranthes" Full Burnern from Mobile Suit Gundam 0083: Stardust Memory, while the Mk-II designation of the support unit pays homage to the Build Gundam Mk-II from the previous season.
LGZ-91St Lightning Gundam Strider (ライトニンガンダムストライダー, Raitoningu Gandamu Sutoraidā)
A second upgrade to the Lightning Gundam in Gundam Build Fighters Try Island Wars. It uses the lighter and more versatile Lightning Back Weapon System Mk-III (ライトニングバックウェポンシステムMk-III, Raitoningu Bakku Uepon Shisutemu Māku Surī), which is designed and named after the G-Strider mode of the AGE-2 Gundam AGE-2 Normal from Mobile Suit Gundam AGE.

MSZ-006LGT Lightning Zeta Gundam (ライトニングZ(ゼータ)ガンダム, Raitoningu Zēta Gandamu)
Yuuma's entry into the Gunpla Builder's Contest Meijin Cup, based on the titular mobile suit from Mobile Suit Zeta Gundam. Despite not being transformable like the original model, the Gunpla is exceptionally detailed, indicating that it may be a complete scratch build. Aside from a beam rifle and two beam sabers, it can combine its wing binders with its shield to execute the Phoenix Burst (フェニックスバースト, Fenikkusu Bāsuto), an energy attack similar to one of Sekai's final attacks. The Lightning Zeta Gundam wins the Open Course trophy in the contest.
PF-73-3BL Gundam Lightning Black Warrior (ガンダムライトニングブラックウォリアー, Gandamu Raitoningu Burakk Woriā)
Yuuma's custom Gunpla in Gundam Build Fighters: Battlogue, based on Meijin Kawaguchi the 3rd's PF-78-3A Gundam Amazing Red Warrior. Aside from replicating the Red Warrior's appearance and performance, Yuuma has enhanced the Gunpla's long range armaments to better suit his fighting style.
RGM-237C Powered GM Cardigan (パワードジムカーディガン, Pawādo Jimu Kādigan)
Fumina Hoshino's first Gunpla in the series, it is based on the RGM-79C Powered GM from Mobile Suit Gundam 0083: Stardust Memory. The Gunpla is upgraded with additional leg armor, shoulder armor that stores two beam sabers, forearm armor with Gatling guns, and a Powered Arms Powerder (パワードアームズパワーダー, Pawādo Āmsu Pawādā) backpack with four control arms that hold two large beam rifles and two shields.
SD-237 Winning Gundam (ウイニングガンダム, Uiningu Gandamu)
An original SD Gundam Gunpla built by Fumina for the All-Japan Gunpla Battle Championship. Intended to be a support unit, it makes full use of its characteristics as an SD Gundam, and is loaded with various gimmicks such as recombining transformation into a Core Booster. The Gunpla is equipped with a beam machine gun and a radome shield with a buzzsaw. During battle, the Winning Gundam is able to separate into component pieces that can combine with other Gunpla to increase their abilities. For example, the torso links to the Build Burning Gundam's arm to form the Winning Knuckle (ウイニングナックル, Uiningu Nakkuru). The Winning Gundam's backpack and legs dock with the Lightning Gundam's beam rifles to each become the Winning Launcher (ウイニングランチャー, Uiningu Ranchā); alternatively, the parts can link with the Winning Gundam's beam machine gun. At the same time, the Winning Gundam's head transforms into a Core Fighter.

SD-237S Star Winning Gundam (スターウイニングガンダム, Sutā Uiningu Gandamu)
Fumina's Winning Gundam is upgraded with new armor parts and a new thruster backpack, which can deploy funnels for additional ranged attacks. With the concept of being a support unit is kept and using the concepts of both SD and Real-type gunpla, it is also made into a more offensive unit than the former. Though its primary form is that of an SD, Star Winning Gundam can transform into "Real Mode" (リアルモード, Riaru Mōdo), a more traditionally scaled "High Grade" design that grants higher performance and a wider variety of attacks and abilities, including a uniquely stylized "Winning Beam" (ウイニングビーム, Uiningu Bīmu) attack from its V-fin. In Gundam Build Fighters Try Island Wars, the Star Winning Gundam is upgraded with the "New Winning Road". The funnels form a Plavsky Power Gate for the Gunpla and other allied Gunpla to cross through and convert into energy; this energy is then absorbed into the backpack of the Kamiki Burning Gundam, dramatically increasing its power output to the point of summoning the Golden God Superior Kaiser.

MS-09 Dom (ドム, Domu)
The Dom is Sekai's first Gunpla, based on the Zeon mobile suit from Mobile Suit Gundam. He discovers it hidden inside Sei Iori and Reiji's championship trophy in the Gunpla Battle Club display cabinet. During Sekai's battle with Yuuma, the Dom is destroyed, only to reveal the Build Burning Gundam underneath its armor.
GW-9800 Gundam Airmaster (ガンダムエアマスター, Gandamu Eamasutā)
The Gundam Airmaster is a Gunpla previously used by Yuuma, based on the mobile suit from After War Gundam X. It is repainted in a white/blue color scheme and upgraded with the GT-9600 Gundam Leopard's missile pods, as well as a long range sniper rifle. The Gundam Airmaster is destroyed by Saga Adou's Hydra Gundam in a Gundam Battle over a year before the events of this series.
Musha Godmaru (武者號斗丸（ムシャゴッドマル）, Musha Goddomaru)
The Musha Godmaru is an SD Gunpla from the BB Senshi series, built by Sekai. Its finishing technique is the Bakunetsu-no-Jin (爆熱の陣). It is destroyed by Minato Sakai's Kouki Gundam in episode 4.
MS-09R-35 Dom R35 (ドムR35, Domu Āru Sanjūgo)
Mr. Ral's custom Gunpla, based on the MS-09 Dom from Mobile Suit Gundam. Aside from the Dom's standard armament, the Dom R35 is equipped with two spiked shields, knee claws, and additional thrusters in the torso and backpack. Ral deploys this Gunpla to prevent Meijin Kawaguchi from interfering with the free-for-all Gunpla Battle during the Gunpla Builder's Contest Meijin Cup.
Golden God Superior Kaiser (黄金神スペリオルカイザー, Kogane-shin Superioru Kaizā)
A giant Gunpla formed out of the combined powers of the Kamiki Burning Gundam, Lighting Gundam Strider, Star Winning Gundam, Gyancelot, ZZII, 00 Gundam Shia Qan[T], Beargguy Pretty, and Petit'gguy ChaChaCha Brown. With one punch, the Golden God Superior Kaiser defeats the rogue Scramble Gundam and disperses the Plavsky particle crystal in the Nielsen Lab.

=== Seiho Academy ===
KUMA-F Beargguy Family (ベアッガイF(ファミリー), Beaggai Famirī)
A customized KUMA-03 Beargguy III (KUMA-02 Beargguy II in the anime), the Beargguy F is Mirai Kamiki's Gunpla for the Tokyo Gunpla Collection (東京ガン☆コレ, Tōkyō Gan Kore) competition, built with the assistance of Yuuma. It is painted white and composed of two components: the Mamagguy (ママッガイ, Mamaggai) and the little Petit'gguy (プチッガイ, Puchiggai) support unit attached on the Chair Striker (チェアーストライカー, Cheā Sutoraikā) backpack. When the Mamagguy is destroyed or severely damaged, pilot control is automatically switched over to the Petit'gguy. As the Mamagguy is designed around the MSN-04 Acguy from Mobile Suit Gundam, it retains that suit's submarine propulsion system. The Petit'gguy lacks those features, but it can blow a bubble and use it to cross water surfaces.
KUMA-P Beargguy Pretty (ベアッガイP(プリティ), Beaggai Puriti)
An upgraded version of Mirai's Beargguy F in Gundam Build Fighters Try Island Wars. The Gunpla is repainted in pink and equipped with a Pretty Stick (プリティステッキ, Puriti Sutekki) and the Love Striker (LOVEストライカー, Rabu Sutoraikā) backpack. The Beargguy Pretty can swap the Love Striker with a Chair Striker to accommodate a Petit'gguy unit.

Petit'gguy ChaChaCha Brown (プチッガイ チャチャチャブラウン, Puchiggai Chachacha Buraun)
Satomi Funaki's Gunpla, colored brown. Its pouch is able to store several weapons, including the ASW-G-08 Gundam Barbatos' mace from Mobile Suit Gundam: Iron-Blooded Orphans.

AEU-09T AEU Enact Custom (AEUイナクトカスタム, AEU Inakuto Kastamu)
Daiki Miyaga's custom Gunpla based on the AEU Enact from Mobile Suit Gundam 00. It is a modified Commander Type Gunpla with parts from the AEU-09Y812 AEU Enact Ali Al-Saachez Custom, resulting in improved mobility and armament. The AEU Enact Custom is destroyed by Sekai's MS-09 Dom in episode 1.
AEU-MA07013 Agrissa Type 13 (アグリッサタイプ13, Agurissa Taipu Jū-san)
Just like the mobile armor seen in Mobile Suit Gundam 00, the Agrissa is a support unit that can dock with Miyaga's AEU Enact Custom. It is armed with a plasma field that disables enemy units. The Agrissa and AEU Enact Custom are destroyed by the combined efforts of Sekai's Build Burning Gundam, Fumina's Powered GM Cardigan, and Yuuma's Lightning Gundam in episode 2.
RMS-116H Hobby Hizack (ホビー・ハイザック, Hobī Haizakku)
Eri Shinoda's custom Gunpla based on the Neo-Zeon mobile suit from Mobile Suit Gundam: Char's Counterattack. While the real Hobby Hizack is a downgraded and unarmed civilian mobile suit, Eri's version is armed with a beam rifle. The Hobby Hizack is quickly destroyed by Fumina's Powered GM Cardigan in episode 2.

=== Song Dynasty Vase ===
AMX-104GG R-Gyagya (R・ギャギャ, R Gyagya)
Kaoruko Sazaki's personal Gunpla based on the AMX-104 R-Jarja from Mobile Suit Gundam ZZ. It incorporates the dual shield and Gatling gun concept first seen in Susumu Sazaki's YMS-15SS Gyan Vulcan from the previous season. The shields are made of a metal material which is resistant to even the Build Burning Gundam's attacks. The R-Gyagya's shields are attached to shoulder-mounted arms and can be used as melee weapons to pulverize enemy Gunpla. The R-Gyagya is destroyed by the Mega-Shiki in episode 8.
YMS-15KRT02 Gyancelot (ギャンスロット, Gyanserotto)
Kaoruko's Gunpla in Gundam Build Fighters Try Island Wars, based on the YMS-15 Gyan from Mobile Suit Gundam. The Gunpla has been redesigned into a more medieval knight look. Aside from the Gyan's standard beam saber and missile shield, the Gyancelot is armed with a lance that extends its blades to form a pattern similar to the Zeon symbol. The Gunpla's special attack is the "Divine Wrath" (天罰覿面, Tenbatsu Tekimen), which involves using the lance to absorb lightning bolts and sending them to enemy targets.
GF13-050NSW Nobel M Gundam (ノーベルガンダム, Nōberu Gandamu)
Mahiru Shigure's purple Gunpla based on the Neo-Sweden mobile suit from Mobile Fighter G Gundam. Aside from its color scheme, it differs from its base design in that the "long blonde hair" of the original Nobel has been replaced by a much shorter purple ponytail that resembles that of its builder, and it has been given a beam bow from a Rising Gundam as a ranged armament. It is destroyed by the Mega-Shiki's Mega Ride Launcher in episode 8.
JMF1336R Rising K Gundam (ライジングガンダム, Raijingu Gandamu)
Keiko Sano's blue Gunpla based on the Neo-Japan mobile suit from Mobile Fighter G Gundam. Aside from its color scheme, it bears very few, if any differences from the original Rising Gundam's design. It is destroyed by the G-Bomber in episode 8.
Impulse GM Mahiru Custom (インパルスジム（マヒル仕様）, Inparusu Jimu Mahiru Shiyō)
Mahiru's Gunpla in Gundam Build Fighters Try Island Wars, based on the ZGMF-X56S Impulse Gundam from Mobile Suit Gundam SEED Destiny, fitted with a head resembling the FX-9900 GX-Bit from After War Gundam X. The Gunpla's shield, backpack, and beam rifle form the wings, body, and one leg of the form The Northern Pod (ザ ノーザンポッド, Za Nōzan Poddo), respectively.
Impulse GM wktk Custom (インパルスジムwktkカスタム, Inparusu Jimu wktk Kasutamu)
Keiko's Impulse GM uses a GM-type head. The Gunpla's backpack, shield, and beam rifle form the head and one leg of The Northern Pod, respectively.
YMS-15TS Gyan (ギャン, Gyan)
Tateo Sazaki's Gunpla based on the Zeon mobile suit from Mobile Suit Gundam. It shares the same upgrades as the original Gunpla built by his elder brother Susumu seven years prior. This Gyan is repainted in silver to completely resemble a knight in shining armor.
HG-01 Hyper Gyanko (はいぱーギャン子, Haipā Gyanko)
Tateo's custom Gunpla in episode 3 of Gundam Build Fighters: Battlogue. It is an MS Girl modeled after his elder sister Gyanko, with parts and accessories from his elder brother Susumu's YMS-15SS Gyan Vulcan. Hyper Gyanko ventures on a fantasy quest with Super Fumina to defeat the Evil Mold Miyaga.

HG-02R Rick-do Gyanko (りっくどギャン子, Rikkudo Gyanko)
An upgrade of Hyper Gyanko in episode 3 of Gundam Build Fighters: Battlogue, using parts from the MS-09R Rick Dom from Mobile Suit Gundam. In the episode, Hyper Gyanko uses "HG Dual Trans-Am" (HGデュアルトランサム, HG Duaru Toransamu) to magically change into Rick-Do Gyanko to battle the swarm of Acguy heads before their overwhelming numbers destroy her armor.

=== G-Master ===
MSN-001M Mega-Shiki (百万式（メガシキ）, Megashiki)
The Mega-Shiki is a custom Gunpla built by Minato Sakai for Shunsuke Sudou, based on the MSN-001 Delta Gundam from Mobile Suit Gundam Unicorn MSV and named after the MSN-00100 Hyaku-Shiki from Mobile Suit Zeta Gundam. It is repainted in light blue with an anti-beam coating and equipped with the Mega Ride Launcher (メガライドランチャー, Mega Raido Ranchā), a backpack that transforms into the Mega Launcher or Mega Rider. In episode 9, the Mega-Shiki is severely damaged by the Lightning Gundam during battle, but remains functional toward the end of the Try Fighters vs. G-Master battle. Its remaining left arm is completely shattered after punching the Build Burning Gundam in the head, rendering the Mega-Shiki unable to fight and giving the victory to the Try Fighters.
LM312V04 Amethyst Victory Gundam (アメジストヴィクトリーガンダム, Amejisuto Vikutorī Gandamu)
Yomi Sakashita's custom Gunpla based on the League Militaire mobile suit from Mobile Suit Victory Gundam. The Amethyst Victory Gundam is repainted in a white/purple/pink livery and equipped with the β Sword Silhouette Pack of the ZGMF-X56S/β Sword Impulse Gundam from Mobile Suit Gundam SEED Destiny. Its lower torso is destroyed by the Build Burning Gundam's Winning Knuckle before its upper torso docks with the G-Bomber in episode 9.
G-P.A.R.T.S DELTA G-Bomber (Gボンバー, Jī Bonbā)
Akira Suga's custom Gunpla based on the G-Fighter from Mobile Suit Gundam. The G-Bomber is fitted with stealth bomber wings to carry four missile launchers. It can also deploy arms underneath its fuselage for melee attacks, grabbing its opponent and crushing it against its tank treads. Like the original unit, the G-Bomber can dock with the upper body of any mobile suit that uses a Core Block System. In episode 9, after the top portion is destroyed by the Build Burning Gundam's Winning Knuckle, the G-Bomber combines with the Amethyst Victory Gundam's upper body as a last-ditch effort to eliminate the Try Fighters, but the combined mecha is finished off by the Build Burning Gundam combined with the Winning Gundam's Core Fighter and the Lightning Back Weapon System.
GT-9600-dV Gundam Leopard da Vinci (ガンダムレオパルド・ダ・ヴィンチ, Gandam Reoparudo da Vinchi)
Akira's custom Gunpla based on the Gundam Leopard from After War Gundam X. The Gundam Leopard da Vinci joins the free-for-all Gunpla Battle in episode 25 to duel with Sekai's Kamiki Burning Gundam.
ZZ-999 Zeo Zeong (ジオ・ジオング, Jio Jiongu)
Meguta Yasu's custom Gunpla based on an SD version of the NZ-999 Neo Zeong from Mobile Suit Gundam Unicorn, repainted in gray and modeled after the MSN-02 Zeong from Mobile Suit Gundam. It is destroyed by Akira's G-Bomber in a practice battle, resulting in Akira replacing Meguta in G-Master.
MSN-02 Perfect Zeong (パーフェクトジオング, Pāfekuto Jiongu)
Meguta's second Gunpla, based on the Zeon mobile suit from Mobile Suit Variations. It is essentially a Zeong with legs added to its otherwise uncompleted body. Meguta uses the Perfect Zeong during the free-for-all Gunpla Battle in episode 25.
AMS-129M Zee Zulu (ゼー・ズール, Zē Zūru)
Shunsuke Sudou's previous Gunpla based on the Neo-Zeon mobile suit from Mobile Suit Gundam Unicorn. It is destroyed during the national tournament in a flashback scene in episode 9.

=== Team SRSC ===
Team SRSC uses three custom Gunpla based on the RX-79[G]Ez-8 Gundam Ez8 from Mobile Suit Gundam: The 08th MS Team. The configuration of these units is a nod to the titular mecha trio of Sunrise's 1987 anime series Metal Armor Dragonar.

RX-79[G]Ez-SR1 Gundam Ez-SR Intruder (ガンダムEz-SRイントルーダー, Gandamu Ez-SR Intorūdā)
The Intruder is a close combat unit, armed with electromagnetic knuckles. It is destroyed by the Build Burning Gundam in episode 6.
RX-79[G]Ez-SR2 Gundam Ez-SR Eliminator (ガンダムEz-SRエリミネーター, Gandamu Ez-SR Eriminētā)
The Eliminator is a long range unit, armed with a missile pod, a 180 mm cannon, and optical camouflage. It is sniped by the Lightning Gundam in episode 6.
RX-79[G]Ez-SR3 Gundam Ez-SR Shadow Phantom (ガンダムEz-SRシャドウファントム, Gandamu Ez-SR Shadou Fantomu)
Armed with a head-mounted radome, the Shadow Phantom specializes in electronic warfare. It is gunned down by the Winning Gundam in episode 6.

=== Team FAITH ===
ZGMF-X42S Destiny Gundam (デスティニーガンダム, Desutonī Gandamu)
Shimon Izuna's Gunpla based on the ZAFT mobile suit from Mobile Suit Gundam SEED Destiny. Built by Shimon's younger brother Mamoru, this Gunpla stands out from all of the others seen in the series thus far in that it is a "straight build", meaning that Mamoru snapped it together straight out of the box without any extra touch-ups or modifications whatsoever, such as painting or seam line and nub removal. Despite its perceived poor performance due to the low quality of its build, Shimon has incorporated his own skills as a boxer into his Gunpla Battles (not unlike how Sekai incorporates his Jigen Haoh kenpo style), which more than makes up for his Destiny's handicap. The Destiny Gundam inflicts severe damage on Sekai's Build Burning Gundam, but is destroyed in the end of their battle in episode 7.
ZGMF-X56S/θ Destiny Impulse Gundam (デスティニーインパルスガンダム, Desutonī Inparusu Gandamu)
Mamoru's custom Gunpla based on the ZAFT mobile suit from Mobile Suit Gundam SEED Destiny-MSV. He enters it in the Junior Course of the Gunpla Builder's Contest Meijin Cup in episode 25, but loses to Tateo Sazaki's Gyan. Later in the episode, Shimon pilots it in the Gunpla Battle free-for-all.
MVF-M11C Murasame (ムラサメ)
Gorou Masuda's Gunpla based on the Orb Union mobile suit from Mobile Suit Gundam SEED Destiny and a straight build as well. Despite being heavily damaged, it rams Yuuma's Lightning Gundam out of the battlefield in episode 7, eliminating both Gunpla in the battle.
GAT-04+AQM/E-A4E1 Jet Windam (ジェットウインダム, Jetto Uindamu)
Kouji Tanioka's Gunpla based on the Earth Alliance mobile suit from Mobile Suit Gundam SEED Destiny and another straight build. It is eliminated along with Fumina's Winning Gundam in episode 7 after Kouji sends both Gunpla out of the battlefield.

=== Celestial Sphere ===
GN-9999 Transient Gundam (トランジェントガンダム, Toranjento Gandamu)
Wilfrid Kijima's custom Gunpla, which is based on the GN-001 Gundam Exia from Mobile Suit Gundam 00. The entire Gunpla is custom built for all-purpose combat and finely tuned for Wilfred's use. Because of its overall customization, its overall performance is at the same as the Gundam The End, and also can even last through a fight against the Build Burning Gundam. It attacks using the GN Partisan (GNパルチザン, GN Parutezan), that can generate particle bits and use them as projectiles. During the final round in episode 24, both the Transient Gundam and Try Burning Gundam inflict severe damage on each other until the end of the time limit. After some quick repairs, both Gunpla engage in a grueling overtime round until the Transient Gundam is destroyed by the Try Burning Gundam.
RX-END Gundam The End (ガンダムジエンド, Gandamu Ji Endo)
Saga Andou's custom Gunpla, its body is concealed in a mantle similar to the Normal Mode of the GF13-001NHII Master Gundam of Mobile Fighter G Gundam, with gigantic hands that resemble those of the GNMA-0001V Regnant from Mobile Suit Gundam 00. These hands shoot DE Fangs from the fingers and enable the Gunpla's finisher, "Dead End Finger" (デッドエンドフィンガー, Deddo Endo Fingā), in which each palm can consume an enemy Gunpla. The Gundam The End is also armed with the "Shot The End" (ショットジエンド, Shotto Ji Endo) revolver, which resembles a six-shooter from Westerns. The Gunpla's secret weapon in its abdomen is the Ikkaku (イッカク) a miniature Gunpla that resembles the RX-0 Unicorn Gundam. The Gundam The End and Gundam Portent are critically damaged by the full power of Fumina's Star Winning Gundam's Winning Beam during the final round of the national tournament in episode 24. Later during the fight, both the Gundam The End and Yuuma's Lightning Back Weapon System Mk-II are eliminated after Yuuma unleashes the last of his missiles in the Gundam The End's midsection.
GNW-100P Gundam Portent (ガンダムポータント, Gandamu Pōtanto)
Shia Kijima's customized Gunpla, initially based on the GNW-100A Sakibure from Mobile Suit Gundam 00I 2134. The Gunpla is equipped with a Particle Transformation Field that allows it not to be hit by projectile and beam attacks. Due to the peakiness of the suit's build, its overall performance focuses on high speed combat. In the event of sustaining damage, the Gundam Portent can repair itself by deploying Haro-piloted Karel units from the Portent Flyer (ポータントフライヤー, Pōtanto Furaiyā). During the final round in episode 24, both the Gundam Portent and Star Winning Gundam eliminate each other after from direct hits to the chest with their melee weapons. It was later repaired in episode 25, where it participates in a free-for-all Gunpla Battle.
GNT-0000SHIA Gundam 00 Shia Qan[T] (ガンダムダブルオーシアクアンタ, Gandamu Daburu Ō Shia Kuanta)
Shia's Gunpla in Gundam Build Fighters Try Island Wars based on the GNT-0000 00 Qan[T] from Mobile Suit Gundam 00 the Movie: A Wakening of the Trailblazer. The Gunpla is painted in the Portent's white and green colors and equipped with a redesigned GN Shield with sword bits. A distinguishing feature of this Gunpla is the addition of cat ears on its head.
Cruel Gundam (クルエルガンダム, Kurueru Gandamu)
Saga's Gunpla primarily based on the OZ mobile suit OZ-15AGX Hydra Gundam from New Mobile Report Gundam Wing Dual Story: G-Unit, fitted with parts from the Endless Waltz versions of the XXXG-01D2 Gundam Deathscythe Hell and the XXXG-01S2 Altron Gundam, as well as other miscellaneous custom parts. It destroyed Yuuma's Gundam Airmaster in a previous Gunpla Battle tournament.
CB-9696G/C/T Reversible Gundam (リバーシブルガンダム, Ribāshiburu Gandamu)
Alan's Gunpla based on the CB-0000G/C Reborns Gundam from Mobile Suit Gundam 00, it is used on a simulated battle against Tatsuya's Ballistic Zaku, piloted first by an AI based on Ribbons Almark, then another based on Amuro Ray. Aside from its Gundam and Cannon modes, the Reversible Gundam also transforms into Tank mode, giving it long-range firepower.

=== Team White Wolf ===
Team White Wolf's Gunpla are based on the MS-06R1-A Zaku II High Mobility Type from Mobile Suit Variations. The team is singlehandedly defeated by Lucas Nemesis' Crossbone Gundam X1 Full Cloth in the quarterfinals of the national tournament in episode 20.

MS-06R1-WW1 Zaku Mánagarmr (ザク・マーナガルム, Zaku Mānagarumu)
Kenshou Matsunaga's custom Gunpla, painted in white with silver accents. In keeping with the White Wolf theme, the Zaku Mánagarmr's shoulder armor is designed to look like a wolf on the Gunpla's shoulders. The Gunpla gets its name from the wolf Hati Hróðvitnisson of Norse mythology.
MS-06R1-WW2 Zaku Alvaldi (ザク・アルヴァルディ, Zaku Aruvarudi)
Minoru Koshiba's custom Gunpla, painted in the traditional green Zaku II colors. A heavy armor type, the Zaku Alvaldi is equipped with two large tanks on its back and two hand-held shields. The Gunpla is named after the Norse mythological giant.
MS-06R1-WW3 Zaku Kraken (ザク・クラーケン, Zaku Kurāken)
Yoshiki Uzuki's custom Gunpla, painted in black and gray. An assault type mobile suit, the Zaku Kraken is armed with psycommu weaponry such as funnels and wire-guided 5-barrel mega particle guns, similar to the MSN-01 Psycommu Test Type Zaku II from Mobile Suit Variations. The Gunpla gets its name from the sea creature of Scandinavian folklore.

=== Great K ===
xvg-xxx Vagan Gear K (ヴェイガンギアK, Veigan Gia Kei)
Great K's Gunpla based on the Vagan mobile armor from Mobile Suit Gundam AGE, repainted in gold. It is destroyed by Shia Kijima's Gundam Portent during the first round of the national tournament in episode 16.
GN-006 Cherudim Gundam (ケルディムガンダム, Kerudimu Gandamu)
Kei Karima's Gunpla based on the Celestial Being mobile suit from Mobile Suit Gundam 00. Overpowered by the Transient Gundam, the Cherudim Gundam concedes during the four-way battle royal in episode 13.
XMA-01 Rafflesia (ラフレシア, Rafureshia)
Kei's entry into the Gunpla Builder's Contest Meijin Cup, based on the Crossbones Vanguard mobile armor from Mobile Suit Gundam F91. Unlike the original mobile armor, this Gunpla is equipped with anti-personnel Bugs. Due to its massive size and inability to fit into the regulation display case, the Rafflesia is disqualified from the contest. It is eventually destroyed by everyone else in the free-for-all Gunpla Battle in episode 25.

=== Team SD-R ===
Team SD-R uses a trio of SD Gunpla which are called SxDxG Gundam (SxDxGガンダム, SxDxG Gandamu). All three Gunpla can combine into the dragon-like Mobile Armor Snibal-Drago-Gira (スナイバル・ドラゴ・ギラ, Sunaibaru Dorago Gira). The Gunpla is destroyed by the combined efforts of the Try Fighters in the second round of the national tournament.

SDG-R1 Snibal Gundam (スナイバルガンダム, Sunaibaru Gandamu)
The customized Gunpla of Toshiya Shiki, it specializes in tactical combat and is equipped with a Pile Bunker for close ranged attacks.
SDG-R2 Dragonagel Gundam (ドラゴナーゲルガンダム, Doragonāgeru Gandamu)
Nobuya Shiki's Gunpla, which uses the Absorb System similar to the Star Build Strike Gundam.
SDG-R3 Giracanon Gundam (ギラカノンガンダム, Girakanon Gandamu)
Kazuya Shiki's personal Gunpla, it uses a long-ranged bazooka for shooting down enemies.

=== Build Busters ===
Saikyo Kido Gundam Tryon 3 (最強機動ガンダムトライオン3, Saikyō Kidō Gandamu Toraion Surī; lit. 'The Strongest Mobile Tryon 3')
Team Build Busters' custom Gunpla, built by Minato Sakai and based on the MSZ-010 Double Zeta Gundam from Mobile Suit Gundam ZZ. It has been redesigned to pay homage to the Brave series line of mecha, with the ability to separate into three animal mecha: TRY-M1 Riku Tryon (リクトライオン, Riku Toraion) (liger, which forms Gundam Tryon 3's backpack and chest), TRY-M2 Umi Tryon (ウミトライオン, Umi Toraion) (manta ray, which forms Gundam Tryon 3's upper torso and arms), and TRY-M3 Sora Tryon (ソラトライオン, Sora Toraion) (bird, which forms Gundam Tryon 3's lower torso and legs). Gundam Tryon 3 uses Super Robot attacks such as the "Armed Booster" (アームドブースター, Āmudo Būsutā) (a rocket punch attack), "Liger Glare" (ライガーグレア, Raigā Gurea) (a beam attack emitting from the liger head's eyes), "Heat Wing" (ヒートウイング, Hīto Uingu) (a slashing attack using the super heated forearm shields), "Boomerang Stagger" (ブーメランスタッガー, Būmeran Sutaggā) (the Tryon 3's V-fin converted into a boomerang), "Raptor Breaker" (ラプターブレイカー, Raputā Bureikā) (a kick using the Sora Tryon's talons to grip the enemy Gunpla for added damage), and "Double Cannonade" (ダブルキャノネード, Daburu Kyanonēdo) (the Tryon 3's twin beam cannons). For its finishing attack, Tryon 3 traps the enemy Gunpla in a barrier before unveiling its sword, the Chohoken Hyper Minovsky (超咆剣（ちょうほうけん）ハイパーミノフスキー, Chōhōken Haipā Minofusukī; lit. 'Super Roaring Sword Hyper Minovsky'), and using it to destroy the Gunpla with three Tryzan (トライザン, Toraizan) slashes that form the letter G. Despite inflicting severe damage on the Try Fighters, Tryon 3 is ultimately defeated by Yuuma's battered Lightning Gundam Full Burnern in the semifinals in episode 22.

=== Von Braun ===
XM-X1 Crossbone Gundam X1 Full Cloth (クロスボーン・ガンダムX1フルクロス, Kurosubōn Gandamu Ekkusu Wan Furu Kurosu)
Lucas Nemesis' custom Gunpla, based on the XM-X1 Crossbone Gundam X-1 Kai Kai "Skull Heart" from Mobile Suit Crossbone Gundam: Skull Heart. Unlike the stock High Grade kit, this Gunpla has a detachable core fighter. It is an incredibly versatile unit, featuring high firepower, great mobility, high defense, and has a plethora of weapons allowing Lucas to adapt to nearly any situation. However, such high performance comes at a cost as the Gunpla burns through Plavsky Particles at an accelerated rate when compared to other Gunpla. As such, it can't fight for extended periods without backup allowing it to refuel. The Crossbone Gundam X1 Full Cloth is defeated by Wilfrid's Transient Gundam during the semifinal round in episode 21.
AMS-119C1 Geara Doga [C] (ギラ・ドーガ[C], Gira Dōga Shī)
Taiki Aiba and Rui Tomita's custom Gunpla, based on the Neo-Zeon mobile suit from Mobile Suit Gundam: Char's Counterattack. Taiki's unit is colored blue while Rui's unit is orange and is armed with a gatling gun. Both units are assigned to resupply the Crossbone Gundam X1 Full Cloth's Plavsky particles at hidden waypoints during battle. Rui's unit is destroyed by Adou's Gundam The End and Taiki's unit is sniped by Shia's Gundam Portent during the semifinal round in episode 21.

=== Team Titan ===
NK-13J Denial Gundam (ディナイアルガンダム, Dinaiaru Gandamu)
Junya Inose's custom Gunpla, which specializes in close combat. Originally called Cathedral Gundam (カテドラルガンダム, Katedoraru Gandamu), it is the Gunpla built by the late 2nd Meijin Kawaguchi, seven years before the events of the series. But due to his health condition and collapsing from an unknown disease, it was left unfinished leaving the model in its current state. Junya finished the build several years later after receiving it from his coach and became a Build Fighter in order to get the ultimate technique of the Jigen Haoh School martial Arts. Like the Try Burning Gundam, its clear black parts can emit a bright purple glow, while the back of its head is able to create a hair-like appendage by manipulating Plavsky particles while increasing its fighting strength. Unlike the Try Burning in which Sekai fights fair in the Jigen Haoh School's principle, the Denial Gundam fights like a mad beast and can utilize all of the mixed martial arts style Junya learned. Despite its full capabilities, it is ultimately destroyed by Sekai's Try Burning Gundam in the quarterfinals of the national tournament in episode 20.
GNY-003CL Gundam Abulhool Plus (ガンダムアブルホールプラス, Gandamu Aburuhōru Purasu)
Takuya Tajima's custom Gunpla, which is a GNY-003 Gundam Abulhool from Mobile Suit Gundam 00P fitted with the GN-003 Gundam Kyrios' beam submachine guns. In episode 19, despite using the Pugachev's Cobra technique to outmaneuver Yuuma's Lightning Gundam Full Burnern, it only manages to shoot down the Lightning Back Weapon System Mk-II before being sniped by the Lightning Gundam from above.
LM111E03+SD-VB03A Gundash Blastor (ガンダッシュブラスター, Gandasshu Burasutā)
Hikaru Narita's custom Gunpla, which is an LM111E03 Gun Blastor from Mobile Suit Victory Gundam equipped with the V-Dash Gundam's SD-VB03A Overhang Pack and the New Hyper Bazooka of the RX-93 ν Gundam from Mobile Suit Gundam: Char's Counterattack. It is destroyed by Fumina's Star Winning Gundam in episode 19.

=== Renato Team ===
Striker GN-X (ストライカージンクス, Sutoraikā Jinkusu)
Mario Renato's custom Gunpla based on the GN-X series mobile suits from Mobile Suit Gundam 00.
GNX-803T GN-XIV Type.GBF (ジンクスIVタイプGBF, Jinkusu Fō Taipu GBF)
Julio and Serio Renato's custom Gunpla, which is essentially a recolor of the Earth Sphere Federation mobile suit from Mobile Suit Gundam 00 The Movie: A Wakening of the Trailblazer.

=== Yajima Trading ===
PF-78-3A Gundam Amazing Red Warrior (ガンダムアメイジングレッドウォーリア, Gandamu Ameijingu Reddo Uōria)
A customized Gunpla owned by Tatsuya, it is officially based on the PF-78-3 Perfect Gundam III "Red Warrior" from Plamo Kyoshiro. Personally customized, the Gunpla itself is considered to be improved aesthetically, while retaining the Red Warrior's high performance. It is equipped with newer weapons such as the Long Blade Rifle. The Gundam Amazing Red Warrior's color scheme is also seen as a nod to the titular mecha of Sunrise's 1980 anime series Space Runaway Ideon.
Devil Dragon Blade Zero Gundam (魔竜剣士ゼロガンダム, Maryū Kenshi Zero Gandamu)
A Gunpla owned by Lady Kawaguchi, based on the character of the same name from Shin SD Gundam Gaiden: Knight Gundam Story. The Gunpla itself is custom built and tuned for Lady's fighting style and attacks using the Thunder Dragon Sword and Falcon Swords. It also can go into its super mode called "Devil Dragon Awakening" to increase its performance and take down enemies.
SD-9071A "Kurenai Musha" Red Warrior Amazing (紅武者レッドウォーリアアメイジング, Kurenai Musha Reddo Uōria Ameijingu)
Lady Kawaguchi's custom Gunpla, which is an SD version of the Gundam Amazing Red Warrior. The helmet, backpack, and shields can detach and transform into a cannon. Lady uses this Gunpla to take on Fumina, Gyanko, and Shia during the free-for-all Gunpla Battle in episode 25.
Hi-Mock (ハイモック, Haimokku)
The Hi-Mock is an upgraded variant of the unmanned Mock, which was originally introduced at the end of the 7th Gunpla Battle World Championships. The Gunpla Battle System can generate different types of Hi-Mocks for practice battles, from regular 1/144 scale to 1/48 scale Mega Size Models. The overall colors are a reference to the Scopedog from Armored Trooper Votoms.
BN-876 Scramble Gundam (スクランブルガンダム, Sukuranburu Gandamu)
A Gunpla featured in Gundam Build Fighters Try Island Wars. It is an unmanned Gunpla used to test Yajima Trading's Plavsky Particle Mark II when it suddenly goes out of control and destroys the Nielsen Lab by forming a giant crystal out of the particles. The Scramble Gundam is able to manipulate the Plavsky particles to perform impossible attacks in any situation, such as firing a Diva Photon Ring Ray, a Celestial Being 80m grade GM Laser, and a Colony Laser simultaneously. Despite its immense power, the Scramble Gundam is defeated by the Golden God Superior Kaiser.
MS-06S-BL Ballistic Zaku (バリスティックザク, Baristikku Zaku)
The successor Gunpla of Tatsuya's Zaku Amazing. It is armed with a Double Beam Tomahawk and a Funnel system mounted on its shield. The Ballistic Zaku is used on a simulated Gunpla battle, piloted by an AI based on Char Aznable.
GN-006/SA Cherudim Gundam SAGA Type.GBF (ケルディムガンダムサーガタイプGBF, Kerudimu Gandamu Sāga Taipu GBF)
Tatsuya's unmanned custom Gunpla, based on the Celestial Being mobile suit from Mobile Suit Gundam 00V. The Cherudim Gundam SAGA battles the Renato Team and shoots out the left arm of Serio's GN-XIV, but is destroyed by Julio before going into Trans-Am mode.
GN-001 Gundam Exia (ガンダムエクシア, Gandamu Ekushia)
The unmanned Gundam Exia in episode 4 of Gundam Build Fighters: Battlogue is a 1/60 scale Perfect Grade (PG) (パーフェクトグレード, Pāfekuto Gurēdo) kit. It destroys the right arm of Serio's GN-XIV, but the Renato Team regroups and defeats the Exia after Mario breaks through its armor and self-destructs his Striker GN-X.
amazon.co.jp A-Z Gundam (A-Z(エーゼット)ガンダム, Ē Zetto Gandamu)
Tatsuya's custom transformable Gunpla in episode 5 of Gundam Build Fighters: Battlogue. The A-Z Gundam is based on the MSZ-006 Zeta Gundam and is coated in Yajima Trading's new counter-particle paint. Its name is short for "Amazing Zeta Gundam" and is also derived from Amazon.co.jp (which streamed the Battlogue series on Amazon Prime and initially sold this kit as a store exclusive). Its main weapon is the Prime Cannon (プライムキャノン, Puraimu Kyanon), a combination of its Twin Hyper Mega Launchers. The A-Z Gundam battles Sei's Star Build Galaxy Cosmos to a draw.

=== Others ===
SF-01 Super Fumina (すーぱーふみな, Sūpā Fumina)
Minato's entry into the Gunpla Builder's Contest Meijin Cup, this Gunpla is an MS Girl figure modeled after Fumina Hoshino, with weapons and accessories from her Powered GM Cardigan. Despite his dedication to crafting the Gunpla, Minato does not win the Open Course trophy on the grounds that he used Fumina's likeness without her permission. Upon hearing the protests of Minato over his loss, as well as Fumina's from her embarrassment over the Gunpla's design, Meijin and Lady Kawaguchi decide the only way to settle this issue is for both of Minato and Yuuma's entries to engage in Gunpla Battle. The melee ends up being a free-for-all, with everyone in attendance joining in with their Gunpla. In Gundam Build Fighters Try Island Wars, Minato shows a recolor of this Gunpla called "Super Fumina Ver. Titans Maid" (すーぱーふみなVer.ティターンズメイド, Sūpā Fumina Bājon Titānzu Meido) before Fumina knocks him out stone cold.

WF-02C Command Fumina (こまんどふみな, Komando Fumina)
Minato's upgrade of the Super Fumina in episode 3 of Gundam Build Fighters: Battlogue, with weapons and accessories based on SDV-04 Command Gundam from the SD Command Chronicles. In the episode, Super Fumina uses "HG Dual Trans-Am to magically change into Command Fumina to battle the Acguy heads before their overwhelming numbers destroy her armor.
WF-01 Winning Fumina (ういにんぐふみな, Uiningu Fumina)
Minato's upgrade of the Super Fumina in episode 3 of Gundam Build Fighters: Battlogue, with weapons and accessories based on her Star Winning Gundam. The armor parts are capable of separating and combining into an SD Gundam. In the episode, Command Fumina and Rick-Do Gyanko are close to being defeated by the giant Acguy when Chinagguy and the Petit'gguy population of Bearbear Village shine Gunpla LED units to re-energize them and enable Combat Fumina to use "Gunpla Reincarnation" to transform into Winning Fumina. She then defeats the giant Acguy with the "Falling Star Rainbow" attack.

Kouki Gundam (荒鬼頑駄無（コウキガンダム）, Kōki Gandamu)
Minato's SD Gunpla from the BB Senshi series. Its finishing technique is the Kigan Issen-zan. In addition, the Kouki Gundam can transform into flight mode.
MSZ-008X2 ZZII (ZZII(ダブルゼッツー), Daburu Zettsū)
Minato's Gunpla in Gundam Build Fighters Try Island Wars, based on the MSZ-008 ZII from Mobile Suit Zeta Gundam MSV. Pronounced "Double Z-Two", the Gunpla has been redesigned using parts from the MSZ-010 ZZ Gundam, such as the shoulder armor and wing shields. It has its standard projectile weapons replaced with a Hyper Long Rifle, a Center High Mega Cannon, and two beam bazookas; the latter two can fire simultaneously for the "Tri Burst" (トライバースト, Torai Bāsuto).
煌黒機動 Gundam Dryon III (Drei) (煌黒機動 ガンダムドライオンIII, Kōkoku Kidō Gandamu Doraion Dorai)
Minato's upgraded version of his 最強機動 Gundam Tryon 3 in Gundam Build Fighters: Battlogue.
GSX-401FW Stargazer Gundam (スターゲイザーガンダム, Sutāgeizā Gandamu)
Based on the titular mecha from Mobile Suit Gundam SEED C.E. 73: Stargazer, the Stargazer is a Gunpla used by Lady Kawaguchi.
WD-M01 ∀ Gundam (Taku Custom) (∀ガンダム（TAKU仕様）, Tān Ē Gandamu(Taku Shiyō)
Taku's custom Gunpla based on the titular mecha from Turn A Gundam, repainted in black. The Gunpla can use its shield as a surfboard on water. It is destroyed by Mirai's Petit'gguy in episode 10.
MSN-06S[W] Weiss Sinanju (ヴァイスシナンジュ, Vaisu Shinanju)
An unmanned enemy Gunpla in episode 2 of Gundam Build Fighters: Battlogue, based on the MSN-06S Sinanju from Mobile Suit Gundam Unicorn. Repainted in white and armed with the "Morne Torshvaert" (Sword of the Moon) (モーントシュヴェールト（月の剣）, Mōn Toshuvēruto (Tsuki no Ken)), the Weiß Sinanju proves to be a match for both Yuuma's Gundam Lightning Black Warrior and Minato's Gundam Dryon III.
RMS-154[W] Weiss Barzam (ヴァイスバーザム, Vaisu Bāzamu)
An unmanned enemy grunt Gunpla in episode 2 of Gundam Build Fighters: Battlogue, based on the RMS-154 Barzam from Mobile Suit Zeta Gundam. The Weiß Barzam is repainted in a white and navy blue color scheme similar to A.E.U.G.'s repaint of the RX-178 Gundam Mk-II.
Chinagguy (チナッガイ, Chinaggai)
A custom Gunpla designed after China Kousaka and her KUMA-03 Beargguy III. In episode 3 of Gundam Build Fighters: Battlogue, Chinagguy resides in Bearbear Village, which is invaded by UFOs that abduct the Beargguy population.
MSM-04 Acguy (アッガイ, Aggai)
An unmanned Mega Size Model in episode 3 of Gundam Build Fighters: Battlogue, based on the Zeon marine unit from Mobile Suit Gundam. This Acguy is made out of surplus Acguy parts from Beargguy kits that vow revenge on those who discarded them. It is defeated by Winning Fumina, who uses the "Falling Star Rainbow" attack to teleport the parts to Bandai Hobby Center in Shizuoka to be recycled into Ecopla (エコプラ, Ekopura) kits.
Build Strike Galaxy Cosmos (ビルドストライクギャラクシーコスモス, Birudo Storaiku Gyarakushī Kosumosu)
Sei Iori's custom Gunpla in episode 5 of Gundam Build Fighters: Battlogue. It is the final upgrade of Sei's Build Strike Cosmos from Gundam Build Fighters: GM's Counterattack.
