= Lists of fictional characters by work =

A list of lists of characters in fictional works, broken down by medium and sorted alphabetically by the name of the fictional work.

== Books ==
- List of supporting A Series of Unfortunate Events characters
- List of recurring Albert Campion characters
- List of Alex Rider characters
- List of minor characters in the Alice series
- List of Amelia Peabody characters
- List of Angels & Demons characters
- List of minor Animorphs characters
- List of Anita Blake: Vampire Hunter characters
  - The Vampire Council of Anita Blake: Vampire Hunter
- List of Atlas Shrugged characters
- List of Avalon: Web of Magic characters
- List of Axis of Time characters
- List of Bernice Summerfield characters
- List of Boogiepop characters
- List of The Canterbury Tales characters
- List of Catch-22 characters
- List of Gemma Doyle Trilogy characters
- List of CHERUB characters
- List of The Chronicles of Narnia characters
- List of The Clique series characters
- List of Cthulhu Mythos characters
- List of The Da Vinci Code characters
- List of The Dark Tower characters
- List of Darkness viewpoint characters
- List of Deltora Quest characters
- List of Demonbane characters
- List of The Deptford Mice characters
- List of Dexter characters
- List of Diary of a Wimpy Kid characters
- Discworld characters
- List of Doctor Dolittle characters
- Characters in Dragonriders of Pern
- Drones Club
- List of Dune characters
- List of The Dying Earth characters
- List of characters in Earthsea
- List of Emberverse characters
- List of Ender's Game characters
- List of Fablehaven characters
- List of Fudge series characters
- List of The Godfather series characters
- List of Hank the Cowdog characters
- List of Harry Potter characters
- List of Henderson's Boys characters
- List of minor The Hitchhiker's Guide to the Galaxy characters
- List of His Dark Materials and The Book of Dust characters
- List of The Hobbit characters
- List of The Hunger Games characters
- List of Imran Series characters
- List of Inheritance Cycle characters
- List of Inspector Rebus characters
- List of Jeeves characters
- List of The Jungle Book characters
- List of The Keys to the Kingdom characters
- List of La Comédie humaine characters
- List of Les Misérables characters
- Lists of The Walking Dead characters
  - List of The Walking Dead (comics) characters
  - List of The Walking Dead (TV series) characters
  - List of The Walking Dead (video game series) characters
  - List of Fear the Walking Dead characters
- List of Middle-earth characters
- List of Middlesex characters
- List of Midnight's Children characters
- List of The Mistmantle Chronicles characters
- List of Moby-Dick characters
- List of The Mortal Instruments characters
- List of minor Mulliner characters
- List of The Neverending Story characters
- List of The Night Angel Trilogy characters
- List of One Thousand and One Nights characters
- List of Tom Clancy's Op-Center characters
- List of Otherworld characters
- List of Oz characters
- List of minor Palliser characters
- List of The Penderwicks characters
- List of Peter Pan characters
- List of The Power of Five characters
- List of characters in the Jean le Flambeur series
- List of Ring characters
- List of Robot series characters
- List of Septimus Heap characters
- List of The Seventh Tower characters
- List of The Shapeshifter characters
- List of Sharpe series characters
- List of characters in Shiloh
- List of The Southern Vampire Mysteries characters
- List of Starship Troopers characters
- List of Swallows and Amazons characters
- List of Tom Swift characters
- List of The Tale of Genji characters
- List of Temeraire characters
- List of To Kill a Mockingbird characters
- List of Tom Sawyer characters
- List of Twilight characters
- List of minor Ukridge characters
- List of Ulysses characters
- List of The Underland Chronicles characters
- List of War and Peace characters
- List of Watership Down characters
- List of Wheel of Time characters
- List of Where the Red Fern Grows characters
- List of Wicked characters
- List of minor The Will of the Empress characters
- List of Xanth characters
- List of Ying Xiong Wu Lei characters

Back to top

=== By author ===
- List of Dickensian characters
- List of Robert A. Heinlein characters
- List of Peter Simple characters
- List of P. G. Wodehouse characters
- List of characters in mythology novels by Rick Riordan

Back to top

== Films ==
=== Animated films ===
- List of Balto characters
- List of Cars characters
- List of Disney's Aladdin characters
- List of Disney's Beauty and the Beast characters
- List of Disney's Cinderella characters
- List of Disney's Fantasia characters
- List of Disney's Hercules characters
- List of Disney's Mulan characters
- List of Disney's Sleeping Beauty characters
- List of Frozen characters
- List of Hotel Transylvania characters
- List of Ice Age characters
- List of Khan Kluay characters
- List of Kung Fu Panda characters
- List of Lilo & Stitch characters
- List of Looney Tunes and Merrie Melodies characters
- List of Madagascar (franchise) characters
- List of Monsters vs. Aliens characters
- List of Monsters, Inc. characters
- List of characters in the Shrek franchise
- List of The Emperor's New Groove characters
- List of The Incredibles characters
- List of The Land Before Time characters
- List of The Lego Movie characters
- List of The Lion King characters
- List of The Little Mermaid characters
- List of The Nightmare Before Christmas characters
- List of Toy Story characters
- List of Zootopia characters

Back to top

=== Live-action films ===
- AFI's 100 Years...100 Heroes & Villains
- Characters and races of The Dark Crystal
- List of 28 Days Later characters
- List of A Nightmare on Elm Street characters
- List of Alien characters
- List of American Pie characters
- List of Austin Powers characters
- List of Baahubali characters
- List of Back to the Future characters
- List of Blade Runner characters
- List of Buffy the Vampire Slayer characters
  - List of minor Buffy the Vampire Slayer characters
  - List of Buffyverse villains and supernatural beings
- List of cameo appearances by Alfred Hitchcock
- List of cameo appearances by Peter Jackson
- List of cameo appearances by Stan Lee
- List of Clueless characters
- List of Divergent characters
- List of Evil Dead characters
- List of Final Destination characters
- List of Friday the 13th characters
- List of From Dusk till Dawn characters
- List of Gran Torino characters
- List of Halloween (film series) characters
- List of Harry Potter characters
- List of Hellraiser characters
- List of Highlander characters
- James Bond
  - List of James Bond allies
  - List of Bond girls
  - List of recurring characters in the James Bond film series
  - List of James Bond villains
- List of Jurassic Park characters
- List of Kingsman characters
- List of Let the Right One In characters
- List of Lorien Legacies characters
- List of M*A*S*H characters
- List of My Big Fat Greek Wedding characters
- List of Ocean's characters
- List of Planet of the Apes characters
- List of Predator characters
- List of Puppet Master characters
- List of Rambo characters
- List of Resident Evil film characters
- List of Ring characters
- List of Rocky characters
- List of Saw characters
- List of Scarface characters
- List of Scream (film series) characters
- List of Sin City characters
- List of The Expendables characters
- List of The Grudge characters
- List of The Hunger Games characters
- List of The Karate Kid characters
- List of The Librarian characters
- List of The Mummy characters
- List of The Phantom (film) characters
- List of The Pink Panther characters
- List of The Producers characters
- List of The Stand characters
- List of The Strangerhood characters
- List of Twilight characters
- List of Where the Red Fern Grows characters
- List of fictional cats in film
- List of fictional primates in film
- List of films with LGBT characters
- List of The Godfather series characters
- List of minor characters in The Matrix series
- List of original characters in The Hobbit film series
- List of original characters in The Lord of the Rings film series

Back to top

== Franchises ==
- List of Baahubali characters
- List of Descendants characters
- List of Highlander characters
- List of Ice Age characters
- List of Indiana Jones characters
- List of Looney Tunes and Merrie Melodies characters
- List of characters in The Loud House franchise
- List of characters in Madagascar (franchise)
- List of Mario franchise characters
- List of Muppets
- List of Peter Pan characters
- Pokémon
  - List of Pokémon
- List of Resident Evil characters
- List of Scooby-Doo characters
- List of Sesame Street characters
- List of Star Wars characters
- List of Teenage Mutant Ninja Turtles characters
- The Wiggles characters
- List of Yogi Bear characters

Back to top

== Games ==
=== Roleplaying games ===
- List of Dark Sun characters
- List of Dragonlance characters
- List of Forgotten Realms characters
- List of Greyhawk characters
- List of Ravenloft characters

Back to top

=== Video games ===
- List of Ace Attorney characters
- List of characters in Chrono Trigger
- List of Darkstalkers characters
- List of Donkey Kong characters
- List of The King of Fighters characters
- Characters of Kingdom Hearts
- List of Mortal Kombat characters
- List of Soulcalibur characters
- List of Street Fighter characters
- List of Tekken characters
- List of Touhou Project characters
- List of Virtua Fighter characters
- List of Xenosaga characters

Back to top

== Plays ==
- List of Shakespearean characters (A–K)
- List of Shakespearean characters (L–Z)

Back to top

== Sequential art ==
=== Anime and manga ===
- List of Assassination Classroom characters
- List of Bleach characters
- List of Boogiepop characters
- List of Cardcaptor Sakura characters
- List of D.N.Angel characters
- List of Digimon Adventure characters
  - List of Digimon Fusion characters
  - List of Digimon Tamers characters
- List of Dr. Stone characters
- List of Dragon Ball characters
- List of Fighting Spirit characters
- List of FLCL characters
- List of Fruits Basket characters
- List of Fullmetal Alchemist characters
- List of Gravitation characters
- List of Great Teacher Onizuka characters
- List of InuYasha characters
- List of Kare Kano characters
- List of Kodocha characters
- List of Mobile Suit Gundam characters
- List of Mobile Suit Gundam SEED characters
- List of Naruto characters
- List of Negima! Magister Negi Magi characters
- List of Neon Genesis Evangelion characters
- List of One Piece characters
  - List of One Piece pirates
- List of Ouran High School Host Club characters
- List of Puella Magi Madoka Magica characters
- List of Rurouni Kenshin characters
- List of Sailor Moon characters
- List of Shaman King characters
- List of Witch Hunter characters
- List of xxxHolic characters
- List of Zatch Bell! characters

Back to top

=== Comic books ===
- List of Amalgam Comics characters
- List of The Amory Wars characters
- List of Asterix characters
- List of Big Bang Comics characters
- List of Blueberry characters
- List of The Boys characters
- Lists of DC Comics characters
- List of Elfquest characters
- List of Empowered characters
- List of Iron Man enemies
- List of Johnny the Homicidal Maniac characters
- Lists of Marvel Comics characters
- List of Scott Pilgrim characters
- List of Sin City characters
- List of Sonic the Comic characters
- List of Sonic the Hedgehog comic book characters
- List of Strangehaven characters
- List of Warrior Nun Areala characters
- List of X-Men members

Back to top

=== Comic strips ===
- Secondary characters in Calvin and Hobbes
- List of Dick Tracy characters
- List of Doonesbury characters
- List of For Better or For Worse characters
- List of Garfield series characters
- List of Motley's Crew characters
- List of Peanuts characters
- List of Pearls Before Swine characters

Back to top

=== Webcomics ===
- List of 8-Bit Theater characters
- List of Homestuck characters
- List of Kevin and Kell characters
- Characters of The Order of the Stick
- Characters of Sluggy Freelance

Back to top

== Television series ==
=== Live-action television series ===
- List of 24 characters
- List of 30 Rock characters
- List of 7th Heaven characters
- List of 90210 characters
- List of Absolutely Fabulous characters
- The Addams Family Characters
- List of Alias characters
- List of All Saints characters
- List of 'Allo 'Allo! Characters
- List of Alphas characters
- List of American Horror Story characters
- List of Angel characters
  - List of minor Angel characters
- List of Arrested Development characters
- Lists of Arrowverse characters
  - List of Arrow characters
  - List of Batwoman characters
  - List of Black Lightning characters
  - List of Freedom Fighters: The Ray characters
  - List of Legends of Tomorrow characters
  - List of The Flash characters
  - List of Supergirl characters
- List of Being Human characters
- List of Being Human (North American TV series) characters
- List of Beverly Hills, 90210 characters
- List of The Big Bang Theory characters
- List of The Bill characters
  - List of The Bill characters (A–D)
  - List of The Bill characters (E–L)
  - List of The Bill characters (M-P)
  - List of The Bill characters (Q–Z)
- List of Blackadder characters
- List of Black Books characters
- List of Buffy the Vampire Slayer characters
  - List of minor Buffy the Vampire Slayer characters
  - List of Buffyverse villains and supernatural beings
- List of Charmed characters
- List of Chuck characters
- List of Desperate Housewives characters
- Doctor Who
  - List of Doctors
  - List of Doctor Who Companions
  - List of Doctor Who creatures and aliens
- List of Eureka characters
- List of Fringe characters
- List of Gilmore Girls characters
- List of Glee characters
- List of Heroes characters
- List of Hollyoaks characters (2008)
- List of House characters
- List of How I Met Your Mother characters
- List of Jericho characters
- List of La Luna Sangre characters
- List of Lie To Me Characters
- List of Merlin characters
- The Mentalist Characters
- List of Monk characters
- Mork & Mindy Characters
- Power Rangers
  - List of Power Rangers Dino Charge characters
  - List of Power Rangers Dino Thunder characters
  - List of evil Power Rangers
  - List of Power Rangers Jungle Fury characters
  - List of Power Rangers Lightspeed Rescue characters
  - List of Power Rangers Lost Galaxy characters
  - List of Power Rangers Lightspeed Rescue characters
  - List of Power Rangers Megaforce characters
  - Mighty Morphin Power Rangers Characters
    - Villains in Mighty Morphin Power Rangers
  - List of Power Rangers Ninja Storm characters
  - List of Power Rangers Operation Overdrive characters
  - List of Power Rangers S.P.D. characters
  - List of Power Rangers Samurai characters
  - Power Rangers in Space Characters
    - Villains in Power Rangers in Space
  - List of Power Rangers Time Force characters
  - Power Rangers Turbo Cast and Characters
    - Villains in Power Rangers Turbo
  - List of Power Rangers Wild Force characters
- List of Primeval characters
- List of Prison Break minor characters
- List of Pushing Daisies characters
- List of The Sandman characters
- List of Scream (TV series) characters
- List of characters on Scrubs
- List of Shameless characters
- List of Sherlock characters
- List of Skins characters
- List of Smallville characters
- List of The Sopranos characters
- Star Trek
  - Star Trek: The Original Series Characters
  - Star Trek: The Next Generation Characters
  - Star Trek: Deep Space Nine Characters
  - Star Trek: Voyager Characters
  - Star Trek: Enterprise
    - Main Characters
    - List of minor recurring characters in Star Trek: Enterprise
- List of Supergirl characters
- Super Sentai
  - Himitsu Sentai Gorenger Characters
  - J.A.K.Q. Dengekitai Characters
  - Battle Fever J Characters
  - Denshi Sentai Denziman Characters
  - Taiyo Sentai Sun Vulcan Characters
  - Dai Sentai Goggle-V Characters
  - Kagaku Sentai Dynaman Characters
  - Choudenshi Bioman Characters
  - Dengeki Sentai Changemank Characters
  - Choushinsei Flashman Characters
  - Hikari Sentai Maskman Character
  - Choujuu Sentai Liveman Characters
  - Kousoku Sentai Turboranger Character
  - Chikyu Sentai Fiveman Characters
  - Chōjin Sentai Jetman Characters
  - List of Kyōryū Sentai Zyuranger characters
  - Gosei Sentai Dairanger Characters
  - Ninja Sentai Kakuranger Characters
  - Chouriki Sentai Ohranger Characters
  - Gekisou Sentai Carranger Characters
  - Denji Sentai Megaranger Characters
  - Seijuu Sentai Gingaman Characters
  - Kyuukyuu Sentai GoGoFive Characters
  - Mirai Sentai Timeranger Characters
  - Hyakujuu Sentai Gaoranger Characters
  - Ninpuu Sentai Hurricaneger
  - Bakuryū Sentai Abaranger Characters
  - List of Tokusou Sentai Dekaranger characters
  - List of Mahou Sentai Magiranger characters
  - GoGo Sentai Boukenger Characters
  - List of Juken Sentai Gekiranger characters
  - List of Engine Sentai Go-onger characters
  - List of Samurai Sentai Shinkenger characters
  - List of Tensou Sentai Goseiger characters
  - List of Kaizoku Sentai Gokaiger characters
    - List of returning characters in Kaizoku Sentai Gokaiger
  - List of Tokumei Sentai Go-Busters characters
  - List of Zyuden Sentai Kyoryuger characters
  - List of Ressha Sentai ToQger characters
  - List of Shuriken Sentai Ninninger characters
  - List of Doubutsu Sentai Zyuohger characters
- The Thin Blue Line Characters
- List of This Is Us characters
- List of Torchwood characters
- List of characters in The West Wing

Back to top

=== Animated series ===
- List of Animaniacs characters
- List of Avatar: The Last Airbender characters
- List of characters in The Batman
- List of Beast Wars characters
- List of Ben 10 characters
- List of characters in Camp Lazlo
- List of The Critic characters
- List of Daria characters
- List of characters in Family Guy
- List of recurring Futurama characters
- List of James Bond Jr. characters
- List of The Jetsons characters
- List of Jimmy Neutron characters
- List of Kim Possible characters
- List of Miraculous Ladybug characters
- List of Rocko's Modern Life characters
- List of SpongeBob SquarePants characters
- List of recurring The Simpsons characters
- List of ThunderCats characters
- List of Tom and Jerry characters

Back to top

=== Soap opera ===
- List of Aurora (telenovela) characters
- List of Brookside characters
- List of Coronation Street characters
  - List of original Coronation Street characters
  - List of former Coronation Street characters
- List of Dark Shadows characters
- List of EastEnders characters
- List of former EastEnders characters
- List of Emmerdale characters
- List of former Emmerdale characters
- List of Family Affairs characters
- List of General Hospital characters
- List of Neighbours characters
- List of former Neighbours characters

Back to top

== Miscellaneous ==
- List of CSI characters
  - List of CSI: Crime Scene Investigation characters
  - List of CSI: Miami characters
  - List of CSI: NY characters
  - List of CSI: Cyber characters
- List of General Hospital characters
  - List of General Hospital characters introduced in the 1960s
  - List of General Hospital characters introduced in the 1970s
  - List of General Hospital characters introduced in the 1980s
  - List of General Hospital characters introduced in the 1990s
  - List of General Hospital characters introduced in the 2000s
  - List of General Hospital characters introduced in the 2010s
  - List of General Hospital characters introduced in the 2020s
  - List of General Hospital: Night Shift characters
  - List of children of General Hospital
- Lists of Gundam characters
- List of Mobile Suit Gundam characters
- List of Mobile Suit Zeta Gundam characters
- List of Mobile Suit Gundam ZZ characters
- List of Mobile Suit Victory Gundam characters
- List of Mobile Fighter G Gundam characters
- List of Mobile Suit Gundam Wing characters
- List of After War Gundam X characters
- List of Turn A Gundam characters
- List of Mobile Suit Gundam SEED characters
- List of Mobile Suit Gundam SEED Astray characters
- List of Mobile Suit Gundam 00 characters
- List of Mobile Suit Gundam Unicorn characters
- List of Mobile Suit Gundam AGE characters
- List of Gundam Build Fighters characters
- List of Gundam Reconguista in G characters
- List of Gundam Build Fighters Try characters
- List of Mobile Suit Gundam: Iron-Blooded Orphans characters
- List of Gundam Build Divers characters
- List of Mobile Suit Gundam: The Witch from Mercury characters
- List of One Life to Live characters
- List of The Office characters
  - List of The Office (American TV series) characters
  - List of The Office (British TV series) characters
- List of The Young and the Restless characters
  - List of The Young and the Restless characters introduced in the 1970s
  - List of The Young and the Restless characters introduced in the 1980s
  - List of The Young and the Restless characters introduced in the 1990s
  - List of The Young and the Restless characters introduced in the 2000s
- 2010
- 2011
- 2012
- 2013
- 2014
- 2015
- 2016
- 2017
- 2021
- 2022
- 2024
- 2025
- List of The Railway Series and Thomas & Friends characters
- Lists of Transformers characters
  - List of Beast Wars characters
  - List of The Transformers (TV series) characters
  - List of Transformers film series cast and characters
  - List of Transformers: Robots in Disguise (2000 TV series) characters
- List of Superman & Lois characters

Back to top
