= List of Gundam characters =

The following is a list of lists of characters who appear in a variety of Gundam series arranged based on order of release dates.

- List of Mobile Suit Gundam characters
- List of Mobile Suit Zeta Gundam characters
- List of Mobile Suit Gundam ZZ characters
- List of Mobile Suit Victory Gundam characters
- List of Mobile Fighter G Gundam characters
- List of Mobile Suit Gundam Wing characters
- List of After War Gundam X characters
- List of Turn A Gundam characters
- List of Mobile Suit Gundam SEED characters
- List of Mobile Suit Gundam SEED Astray characters
- List of Mobile Suit Gundam 00 characters
- List of Mobile Suit Gundam Unicorn characters
- List of Mobile Suit Gundam AGE characters
- List of Gundam Build Fighters characters
- List of Gundam Reconguista in G characters
- List of Gundam Build Fighters Try characters
- List of Mobile Suit Gundam: Iron-Blooded Orphans characters
- List of Gundam Build Divers characters
- List of Mobile Suit Gundam: The Witch from Mercury characters
