= List of Transformers: Robots in Disguise (2000 TV series) characters =

This is a list of characters from the 2000 anime series Transformers: Robots in Disguise. The series focuses on two warring species of transforming robots from the planet Cybertron, the Autobots and Predacons.

== Autobots ==
The Autobots are alien robots from the planet Cybertron who came to Earth to pursue the Predacons and assume various vehicular disguises while operating on the planet.

=== Commanders ===
==== Omega Prime ====
Voiced by: Satoshi Hashimoto (Japanese); Daniel Riordan (English)

Omega Prime, or "God Fire Convoy" in Japan, is the combiner forced fusion of Optimus Prime and Ultra Magnus as Matrix. In battle, he can fly and uses Ultra Magnus's weapon of a Lazer and Gatling gun on his shoulders to shoot their enemies. Later, Fortress Maximus gave them the Matrix Blade to defeat Galvatron.

Optimus Prime ("(Super) Fire Convoy" in Japan)
Voiced by: Satoshi Hashimoto (Japanese); Neil Kaplan (English)
Optimus Prime is the leader of the Autobots who possesses a Matrix to symbolize his authority, transforms into a fire truck, and can assume a super mode. Later on in the series, he gains the ability to combine with his brother Ultra Magnus to become Omega Prime.

Ultra Magnus ("God Magnus" in Japan)
Voiced by: Takashi Matsuyama (Japanese); Kim Strauss (English)
Ultra Magnus is Optimus Prime's embittered and violent brother who transforms into a car carrier truck and became jealous of the latter after being passed over for leadership of the Autobots and now seeks to claim Optimus' Matrix for his own, believing it is rightfully his. In pursuit of this goal, Ultra Magnus comes to Earth, grants the Autobot Brothers extra power, and attempts to steal Optimus' Matrix, only to gain the ability to combine with him into Omega Prime. (Note: In Car Robots, Optimus and Ultra Magnus each possess a Matrix, which is held by high-ranking Autobot commanders, and the latter's goal is to take Optimus' Matrix and combine it with his.)

=== Autobot Brothers ===
The Autobot Brothers are a three-man team of Autobots, who can transform into different vehicles, as they're later on given by Ultra Magnus the ability to engage their super changing color mode.

X-Brawn ("Wildride" in Japan)
Voiced by: Masahiro Shibahara (Japanese); Bob Joles (English)
X-Brawn is the eldest and most reliable of the three Autobot Brothers who can transform into a SUV. He loves the extreme, lives for the thrill, can handle any type of environment, and traverse through any terrains. In battle, he is a master of martial arts, possesses super-strength in his left arm, and a winch in his vehicle mode that's capable of pulling him up buildings.

Prowl ("Mach Alert" in Japan)
Voiced by: Takayuki Kondo (Japanese); Wayne C. Lewis (English)
Prowl is the strict middle sibling of the Autobot Brothers who can transform into a Lamborghini Diablo police highway pursuit vehicle. In battle, he wields two missile launchers which can become thrusters courtesy of his vehicle mode.

Side Burn ("Speedbreaker" in Japan)
Voiced by: Punch UFO (Japanese); Wally Wingert (English)
Side Burn is the courageous yet impulsive youngest sibling of the Autobot Brothers who can transform into a Dodge Viper and possesses the most speed out of his two brothers. He has a tendency to pursue red cars much to the dismay of Prowl.

=== Team Bullet Train ===
Rail Racer Voiced by: Shōji Izumi (Japanese); David Lodge (English)

Team Bullet Train is a three-man Combiner team of Autobots who all transform into the engines of their team's namesake and can link up in their vehicle modes and combine in their robot modes to form Rail Racer ("JRX" in Japan).

Railspike, ("J5" in Japan)
Voiced by: Shōji Izumi (Japanese); Mike Reynolds (English)
Railspike is the courageous, intelligent, and grizzled leader of Team Bullet Train who can transform into a 500 Series Shinkansen Nozomi bullet train engine. He serves as a peacekeeper when his teammates get out of hand and, despite his age, is skilled and efficient in combat. In battle, he possesses shoulder-mounted rocket launchers, generate ultrasonic waves, and fire "Reflector Mines". Railspike forms the torso and upper arms of Rail Racer.

Rapid Run (or "J7" in Japan)
Voiced by: Eiji Takemoto (Japanese); Keith Diamond (English)
Rapid Run is an eager, sarcastic, and cool-headed member of Team Bullet Train who transforms into a 700 Series Shinkansen Hikari Rail Star bullet train engine. In battle, he possesses the most strength, can generate a force-field, and wields a rifle and shield. Rapid Run forms the mid-torso and backpack of Rail Racer.

Midnight Express ("J4" in Japan)
Voiced by: Naomi Matamura (Japanese); David Lodge (English)
Midnight Express is the youngest member of Team Bullet Train who can transform into an E4 Series Shinkansen engine. He is known for being cheerful and friendly around friends and harsh with enemies. In battle, he possesses incredible strength, can endure cold weather, fire high temperature missiles, and generate solid light blades from his shoulders. Midnight Express forms the hips and legs of Midnight Express.

=== Spy Changers ===
A team of six Autobot espionage specialists capable of driving on almost any surface, turning invisible, and phasing through solid objects.

Hot Shot ("Artfire" in Japan)
Voiced by: Eiji Takemoto (Japanese); Michael McConnohie (English)
Hot Shot is the leader of the Spy Changers who has fought alongside Optimus Prime for many years and transforms into a Porsche 959 sports car. He outwardly displays a gruff, no-nonsense exterior, but will put the safety of his teammates above all else. In battle, he possesses fire-based attacks.

R.E.V. ("Eagle Killer" in Japan)
Voiced by: Chōtomi Nimura (Japanese); Steve Kramer (English)
R.E.V. (short for Race Exertion Vehicle) is the Spy Changers' tactical officer who can transform into a Lamborghini Diablo. In battle, he possesses incredible leaping capabilities.

Crosswise ("X-Car" in Japan)
Voiced by: Junichi Miura (Japanese); Dan Woren (English)
Crosswise is the Spy Changers' science officer who can transform into a blue "concept car" with an exposed rear engine. He specializes in space engineering, developing new inventions, and maintaining the other Autobots. In battle, he wields an anti-gravity gun.

W.A.R.S. ("Wars" in Japan)
Voiced by: Riki Kitazawa (Japanese); Steve Blum (English)
W.A.R.S. (short for Wicked Attack Recon Sportscar) is a bold and daring yet violent member of the Spy Changers who can transform into a Ford Thunderbird NASCAR stock car. In battle, he possesses heavy armor and wields a machine gun.

Ironhide ("Ox" in Japan)
Voiced by: Eisuke Yorita (Japanese); Michael McConnohie (English)
Ironhide is the Spy Changers' peaceful yet irascible transport expert who transforms into a Ford F150 Flareside pickup truck. Despite being one of the youngest members of the group, he is a battlefield veteran and longtime friend of teammate Mirage. In battle, Ironhide possesses the most strength of the Spy Changers and wields a shockwave rifle.

Mirage ("Counter Arrow" in Japan)
Voiced by: Ryō Naitō (Japanese); Wally Wingert (English)
Mirage is the Spy Changers' marksman who prefers to be alone and can transform into a Lola T94 Indy car. Mirage is voiced by Wally Wingert (U.S.) and by Ryō Naitō (Japan).

=== Build Team ===
Landfill Voiced by: Yukiko Tamaki (Japanese); Michael Reisz (English)

The Autobots' construction experts who initially maintained their Global Space Bridge network before being promoted to a combat role later in the series and can combine into Landfill ("Build King" in Japan).

Wedge ("Build Boy" in Japan)
Voiced by: Yukiko Tamaki (Japanese); Michael Reisz (English)
Wedge is the young, hot-headed, and reckless leader of the Build Team and the Autobots' chief architect who transforms into a bulldozer. In battle, he possesses an almost limitless energy reserve and wields a double-barrelled beam gun. Wedge forms the torso of Landfill.

Heavy Load ("Build Typhoon" in Japan)
Voiced by: Yoshikazu Nagano (Japanese); Daran Norris (English)
Heavy Load is the strongest and most durable member of the Build Team who can transform into a dump truck. He serves as Wedge's personal aide and martial arts instructor. In battle, Heavy Load wields a claw-like weapon and is an expert in several forms of martial arts. Heavy Load can either form an arm or leg of Landfill.

Hightower ("Build Cyclone" in Japan)
Voiced by: Masami Iwasaki (Japanese); Joe Ochman (English)
Hightower is the Build Team's firearms expert and Wedge's personal bodyguard who can transform into a crane truck. In battle, Hightower wields a flamethrower, two pistols, and a cannon. Hightower can either form an arm or leg of Landfill.

Grimlock ("Build Hurricane" in Japan)
Voiced by: Hiroki Takahashi (Japanese); Tom Wyner (English)
Grimlock is Wedge's calm and sunny second-in-command who can transform into an excavator. Despite being a seasoned warrior, Grimlock has a tendency for becoming deep in thought while judging fights and determining how best to relay combat advice to Wedge. In battle, he possesses two pincers on each hand and can convert his excavator arm into a grabber-like weapon. Grimlock can either form an arm or leg of Landfill

=== Fortress Maximus ===
Fortress Maximus Voiced by: Masayuki Kiyama (Japanese); Steve Blum (English)
Cerebros Voiced by: Masayuki Kiyama (Japanese); Steve Kramer (English)

Fortress Maximus, or "Brave Maximus" in Japan, is a Cybertronian battle station hidden on Earth in order to protect it. His activation keys - the O-Parts, the Orb of Sigma, and a small robot called Cerebros ("Plasma" in Japan) that forms his head via an intermediary robot called the Emissary ("Brave" in Japan) - were scattered across the planet and hidden within ancient structures. While a group of Autobot protoforms were sent to recover him sometime prior to the past, they fell into stasis and Fortress Maximus went undiscovered until the present when the Autobots and Predacons' battle led to their locating the giant Cybertronian.

=== Minor Autobots ===
Skid-Z, ("Indy Heat" in Japan)
Voiced by: Jin Nishimura (Japanese); Michael Lindsay (English)
Skid-Z is an Autobot who scanned the race car of human racecar driver, Augie Cahnay, for his vehicle mode, but ended up absorbing Cahnay's psychotropic energy and developing an uncontrollable desire to enter any race he can find.

Tow-Line ("Wrecker Hook" in Japan)
Voiced by: Masami Iwasaki (Japanese); Lex Lang (English)
Tow-Line is an Autobot obsessed with making sure people and robots only park in the right spots.

== Predacons ==
=== Main Predacons ===
The Predacons, similarly to the Autobots, are aliens from the planet Cybertron who can transform into robotic animals and came to Earth to seek the power of Fortress Maximus for nefarious means.

Megatron ("Gigatron" in Japan)
Voiced by: Yōichi Kobiyama (Japanese); Daniel Riordan (English)
Megatron is the merciless leader of a small group of Predacons who wrought destruction across most of the universe and was sent by a Predacon Council to Earth to steal its energy and obtain Fortress Maximus. After kidnapping, Dr. Kenneth Onishi, an energy expert who discovered most of Fortress Maximus' activation keys, Megatron tasks his Predacons with furthering their mission while he watches their progress from his ship, the Megastar. After uncovering the Orb of Sigma, its power turns Megatron into the energy vampire Galvatron ("Devil Gigatron" in Japan). Using his new powers, he battles the Autobots until he is defeated by Omega Prime and captured to be brought back to Cybertron. As Megatron, he can transform into a bat (Gigabat), two-headed dragon (GigaDragon), jet (GigaJet), car (GigaFormula), and claw (GigaHand). After becoming Galvatron, he gains vampiric powers and the additional ability to transform into a hydrofoil, a griffin, a Pteranodon, and an elephant.

Sky-Byte ("Gelshark" in Japan)
Voiced by: Konta (Japanese); Peter Spellos (English)
Sky-Bite is Megatron's devoted yet comical second-in-command who desires his leader's attention, has a love of poetry, and can transform into a robotic shark. He attempts to lead his fellow Predacons in achieving Megatron's goals, only for his own plans to comically backfire. Following the Decepticons' creation, a jealous Sky-Byte goes to greater lengths to prove his worth to Megatron. However, this culminates him saving a group of civilians he intended to take hostage and accidentally freeing the Predacons' human captive, Dr. Kenneth Onishi. In light of these events, Sky-Byte is mistaken for a hero by and gains admiration from human children, which he eventually comes to accept. While the Autobots defeat, capture, and return the Predacons to Cybertron, Sky-Byte secretly escapes into Earth's oceans. In battle, Sky-Byte can fire missiles, fly, and burrow underground in his beast mode and wields blades and a rotating claw for a left hand in his robot mode. Sky-Byte is a recolored version of the Transmetals 2 Cybershark from the Beast Wars toyline.

Darkscream ("Guildor" in Japan)
Voiced by: Hiroki Takahashi (Japanese); Steve Blum (English)
Darkscream is a flamboyant Predacon foot soldier with a fascination for samurai and swashbuckler dramas who transforms into a Japanese giant flying squirrel. In Car Robots, he speaks in feudal "de gozaru" style Japanese. In battle, he wields an Energon sword, can produce an electromagnetic cloaking field, is mute while in flight, can become invisible in low light and shadowy environments, can fire the "Center Laser", and possesses competent fencing and swordsmanship skills. Darkscream is a recolored version of Nightglider from the Beast Wars toyline.

Gas Skunk ("Gaskunk" in Japan)
Voiced by: Norio Imamura (Japanese); Jerry DeCapua (English)
Gas Skunk is a snobbish and conceited Predacon demolitions expert and technical specialist who transforms into a skunk. In battle, he can emit acid and wields a serrated tail in beast mode and fire time bombs from his right shoulder, emit gas from his mouth capable of causing uncontrollable laughter, and fire the "Left Laser" in robot mode. Gas Skunk is a recolored version of Stinkbomb from the Beast Wars toyline.

Slapper ("Gusher" in Japan)
Voiced by: Ryō Naitō (Japanese); Peter Lurie (English)
Slapper is a Predacon foot soldier and hacker who serves as Sky-Byte's second-in-command, has a tendency for speaking his mind without thinking ahead, and can transform into a frog. In battle, Slapper possesses incredible leaping capabilities and a whip-like tongue in beast mode and a grabber claw and the "Right Laser" in robot mode. Slapper is a recolored version of Transmetals 2 Spittor from the Beast Wars toyline.

Bruticus
Bruticus is a Predacon who turns into a Cerberus and guards Megatron's prison. He appears in the comics and the toyline.

=== Decepticons ===
The Decepticons, or "Combatrons" in Japan, are formerly six Autobot protoforms who were put into stasis and sent to Earth to find Fortress Maximus, only for their ship to crash in the mid-20th century. In the present, Megatron locates and reprograms them to serve him and bolster his forces.

Scourge ("Black Convoy" in Japan)
Voiced by: Taiten Kusunoki (Japanese); Barry Stigler (English)
Sourge is the leader of the Autobot crew turned leader of the Decepticons who can transform into a tanker truck and resembles a dark version of Optimus Prime after Megatron made Scourge scan a tanker truck and the Autobot leader simultaneously. Scourge initially serves Megatron loyally. However, using his the ability to detect the O-Parts' energy signatures, Scourge set about locating and using Fortress Maximus in an attempt to overthrow Megatron only to be foiled by several programming blocks that prevent Fortress Maximus from being used for evil before Galvatron reprogrammed Scourge back into line. Following Galvatron's defeat, Scourge is captured and taken back to Cybertron to face justice.

==== Commandos ====
Ruinition Voiced by: Holly Kaneko (Japanese); Bob Papenbrook (English)

The Commandos are Decepticon soldiers who can combine to form the giant robot Ruination ("Baldigus" in Japan). All five members are recolored versions of the Combaticons from the The Transformers.

Mega-Octane ("Dolrailer" in Japan)
Voiced by: Holly Kaneko (Japanese); Bob Papenbrook (English)
Mega-Octane is the cool-headed, calculating, and cruel leader of the Commandos who displays no tolerance for failures, is not above treating his subordinates like his limbs, and can transform into a self-propelled artillery truck and a combat station. In vehicle mode, he can fire missiles, wields a laser rifle in robot mode, and perform maintenance on his teammates in station mode. Mega-Octane forms the head and torso of Ruinition.

Armorhide ("Dangar" in Japan)
Voiced by: Takayuki Kondo (Japanese); Richard Epcar (English)
Armorhide is a loud, boastful Commando who specializes in desert warfare and can transform into a Leopard 1 tank. Armorhide forms the left leg of Ruination for flight mode and a right arm for land attacks.

Movor ("Shuttler" in Japan)
Voiced by: Hidenori Konda (Japanese); Robert Axelrod (English)
Movor is a pompous Commando who can transform into a combat space shuttle. He is capable of flying, achieving planetary orbit, possesses powerful detection equipment, excellent heat resistance, and wields a long-range X-Ray laser. Movor forms the right arm for flight mode and a left leg for land attacks.

Rollbar ("Greejeeper" in Japan)
Voiced by: Riki Katazawa (Japanese); Michael Lindsay (English)
Rollbar is a sarcastic Commando skilled in hand-to-hand combat who can transform into a FMC XR311 combat support vehicle. Rollbar forms the right leg of Ruination for flight mode and a left arm for land attacks.

Ro-Tor ("Hepter" in Japan)
Voiced by: Masao Harada (Japanese); Neil Kaplan (English)
Ro-Tor is the Commandos' reconnaissance expert who transforms into a Kaman SH-2 Seasprite. Ro-Tor form the left arm for flight mode and a right left for land attacks.

== Recurring characters ==
=== Main ===
Koji Onishi ("Yuuki Onishi" in Japan)
Voiced by: Akiko Kimura (Japanese); Jason Spisak (English)
The son of Doctor Kenneth Onishi who allies himself with the Autobots to find his father after he is kidnapped by Megatron. While providing advice and knowledge of Earth to the Autobots, Koji later discovers he can control Fortress Maximus.

T-AI ("Tactical-Artificial Intelligence")
Voiced by: Chieko Higuchi (Japanese); Sandy Fox (English)
A sentient computer program who runs operations for the Autobots from their headquarters and takes the form of a young human woman in a pink uniform.

Dr. Kenneth Onishi ("Daichi Ōnishi" in Japan)
Voiced by: Shouji Izumi (Japanese); Kirk Thornton (English)
An archaeologist and father of Koji Onishi whose research eventually led him to the locations of Fortress Maximus' activation keys. Due to this, Megatron kidnaps Dr. Onishi and probes his mind for the information before Dr. Onishi is eventually freed and lends his aid to the Autobots.

=== Others ===
Dorie Dutton
{{voiced by|Mariko Nagahama|Tifanie Christun}
A news reporter who frequently covers the Transformers' battles.

Kelly Shiragami ("Junko Shiragami" in Japan)
Voiced by: Chieko Higuchi (Japanese); Philece Sampler (English)
A hapless young woman who owns X-Brawn's vehicle disguise and always seems to find herself caught in the crossfire of the Transformers' battles. She always loses her red sports vehicles to the different battles and manages to get them replaced the next episode. In addition, her red sports vehicles are often pursued by Side Burn.

Carl
Voiced by: Mariko Nagahama (Japanese); Joshua Seth (English)
Carl is one of Koji's friends.

Jenny
Voiced by: Mami Fukai (Japanese); Colleen O'Shaughnessey (English)
Jenny is one of Koji's friends.
