= List of CSI characters =

List of CSI characters may refer to:

- List of CSI: Crime Scene Investigation characters; for information on the Las Vegas ensemble of CSI.
- List of CSI: Miami characters; for information on the ensemble of the first CSI spin-off, starring David Caruso.
- List of CSI: NY characters; for information on the ensemble of the CSI: Miami spin-off, starring Gary Sinise.
- List of CSI: Cyber characters; for information on the second direct CSI spin-off's ensemble.
