= Yōichi Kobiyama =

Japanese actor and writer (born 1959)

Yōichi Kobiyama (コビヤマ 洋一, Kobiyama Yōichi)

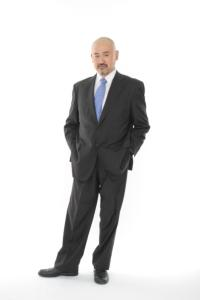
Yoichi Kobiyama

is a Japanese actor and writer. He was born on August 15, 1959, in Tokyo, Japan. As a writer, he uses the pen name Ryō Kajiwara (梶原 涼).

== Anime roles ==
- Transformers: Car Robot: Gigatron/DevilGigatron
- Yu-Gi-Oh! Duel Monsters: Akhenamkhanen
