= List of Middlesex characters =

This is a list of characters from Middlesex, a Pulitzer Prize-winning novel by Jeffrey Eugenides published in 2002.

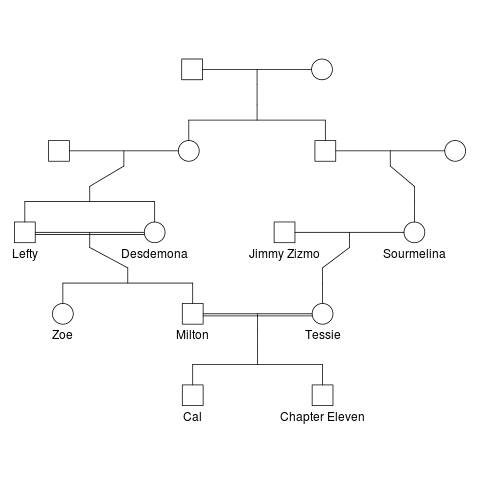
Family relations between the main characters in the novel Middlesex

== Characters ==
- Calliope "Callie" (later changes name to Cal) Helen Stephanides is the omniscient narrator of the novel. In 1960, he is born with 5-alpha-reductase deficiency, a mutation that causes him to physically look like a girl, when in fact, he possesses the hormones of a boy. He attends an all-girls school, where he joins the field hockey team. At the school, Calliope falls in love with the Obscure Object. Calliope experiences the "bulb", which he calls a "crocus", between his legs erect when he thinks about the Obscure Object.
- Chapter Eleven is Calliope's brother. His name plays off how he leads his father's company into bankruptcy. Chapter Eleven refers to the United States bankruptcy law of the same name.
- Clementine Stark is the girl in Grosse Pointe, Michigan, who teaches Calliope how to kiss.
- Obscure Object is the girl with whom Calliope falls in love. The term originated from Eugenides' college days at Brown University with Rick Moody. When the two found the same girl alluring, they would refer to her as the "Obscure Object". She has been identified as the art historian Evonne Levy, who lives in Toronto, Canada.
- Jerome is the Obscure Object's brother. He is the first boy with whom Calliope has sex.
- Eleutherios "Lefty" Stephanides is Calliope's grandfather and Desdemona's husband. He is also Desdemona's brother, and is one year her junior. Desdemona and Lefty grew up in a village called Bithynios in the Turkish territory contested between Greece and Turkey during the breakup of the Ottoman Empire after World War I. The two become orphaned, live by themselves and manage the silk farm. Lefty is a bachelor who is unmoved by the seductive techniques employed by the only two marriageable women in the village. In 1922, when the Turks bombard their village, brother and sister move to Smyrna. Upon their arrival at the city, Smyrna is burned and sacked.

The two escape Smyrna by boarding a boat for America. They profess their love for each other and marry on the boat. They immigrate to Detroit and are sponsored by their cousin, Sourmelina, and her husband Jimmy Zizmo. Lefty and Desdemona have two children together, Milton and Zoe. Lefty works for a production plant at the Ford Motor Company. He is fired after Ford's inspectors visit his home and discover that Zizmo is selling contraband. Following his dismissal, Lefty becomes a gangster for a short period of time before later managing a bar which he names the Zebra Room.
In his later life, on the day Cal is born, Lefty has a stroke, losing his ability to speak. Lefty communicates with his family by writing messages on a chalkboard. To pass time, he translates Sappho's works every day. He smokes hashish and listens to rebetika albums.

- Desdemona Stephanides is Calliope's grandmother. She is the sister and wife of Lefty. On the eve of their departure for America, she and Lefty professed their love to each other and married on the boat. During her pregnancy with Milton, she learned that children of incest are often born with diseases. She tried to distant herself from Lefty sexually, but after giving birth to Zoe, she completely withheld sex from him. Throughout her life, Desdemona is plagued with the incest which she and her brother have committed. After moving to America, she works for a brief time counseling the young women workers of the Nation of Islam the ideal way to generate silk.

Years later, with her silver spoon, she predicts that Calliope will be a boy. She had never been wrong before. Twenty-three prior guesses were correct. This time, however, she is considered wrong because the doctor thought that Calliope was a female.

- Sourmelina "Lina" (née Pappasdiamondopoulis) Zizmo is the cousin of Lefty and Desdemona. She is married to Jimmy Zizmo. Sourmelina and her husband sponsor Lefty and Desdemona to reach America. A former inhabitant of Bithynios, she was married off to Zizmo after she was noticed in an inappropriate relationship with a married woman. She sponsors Desdemona and Lefty, keeping their incestuous relationship a secret due to her own secret, her former lesbian intrigue in Bithynios.
- Jimmy Zizmo is Lina's husband. He abandons her, faking his own death after she gives birth to their first and only child, Theodora ("Tessie"), Cal's mother, due to his erroneous suspicions that the baby is not his. He reinvents himself as Wallace Fard Muhammad, leader of the Nation of Islam.
- Miltiades "Milton" Stephanides is Calliope's father. He is the son of Lefty and Desdemona. Milton is Tessie's husband and second cousin. Milton courts Tessie with a clarinet and marries her after fighting in World War II. Milton loses his first business to a fire in the 1967 Detroit riot. The payments he receives from several insurance companies enables him to finance a hot dog chain called Hercules Hot Dogs not only becomes a profitable household name but also turns him into a millionaire.
- Theodora "Tessie" Stephanides is Calliope's mother. She is Milton's wife and second cousin. After having a son, Chapter Eleven, Tessie longs for a daughter. She and Milton plan the lovemaking to be at the appropriate time to exact the desired result.
- Zoë "Aunt Zoe" Stephanides is Calliope's aunt and Father Mike's wife. She is the daughter of Lefty and Desdemona.
- Michael "Father Mike" Antoniou is an Orthodox priest who is Tessie's former fiancé. He is Aunt Zoe's husband, although he is still in love with Tessie.
- Nishan Philobosian is an Armenian doctor who is evacuated from Smyrna with Lefty and Desdemona after his family is killed by Turkish soldiers, then becomes the Stephanides family's trusted physician in America.
- Marius Wyxzewixard Challouehliczilczese Grimes is an African American who befriends Callie. Marius calls Callie "Little Queen of the Nile". He is named after an Ethiopian nationalist. By day, Marius supports himself through working at a record store, and by night, he studies at the University of Detroit Law School. Upon graduation, he intends to file a lawsuit against the city of Dearborn for housing discrimination against African Americans.

In one of the central scenes in the novel pertaining to black-white relations, Marius reveals that Callie's father is fearful of African Americans and pays money to the police to protect himself against them. This belief is confirmed when Milton, after seeing Marius talking to Callie, tells her to "stay away from people like that". Callie sees him for the last time during the 1967 Detroit riot. Marius sets on fire a rag suspended from the aperture of a Molotov cocktail and hurls it into the Zebra Room, a bar owned by Milton.

- Peter "Uncle Pete" Tatakis is a bachelor who attends the Sunday debating sessions at Milton's house.
- Peter Luce is a sexologist in New York who is considered a foremost expert on hermaphroditism. Dr. Luce is modeled after the 1970s sexologist, John Money. Both Luce and Money believe that nurture determined a person's gender identity and that gender reassignment after two-and-a-half years of age would be disastrous. Luce plans to castrate Calliope and give her progesterone to let her remain female.
- Zora Khyber is a coworker of Cal's at San Francisco's Sixty-Niners, Bob Presto's burlesque club. Appearing fully female despite being genetically male, Zora is affected by complete androgen insensitivity syndrome. She is passionate about intersex visibility despite her ability to pass as female.
- Julie Kikuchi is a Japanese-American photographer with whom Cal has a relationship in his adult life.
