= List of Tom Swift characters =

These are the regular characters from the original Tom Swift series of books (1910-1941).

- Tom Swift — The main character, a lad living with his widower father on their small estate in upper New York state about the time of the First World War and thereafter. His age is unstated, but it is indicated that he ages during the series from late teens to early twenties (and there is a possible hint that he commenced his invention career, prior to the first volume, at age 16). Tom is by no means confined to his workshop or laboratory and is in good physical shape, which is fortunate as his adventures are inevitably strenuous. He is portrayed as a decent, bright, brave, handsome, and quick-witted "American boy".
- Barton Swift — Tom's old and rather frail father, also an inventor, who has served as Tom's main educator and mentor. He takes some part in some adventures, but is too old to go on many of the journeys.
- Ned Newton — Tom's friend and sidekick. Remains a friend of Tom's into adulthood, as seen in the second series. Humorous, dependable, and absolutely loyal — in the parlance of the time, a brick. Originally an employee of the local bank, he eventually became the financial manager of the Swift Construction Company.
- Wakefield Damon — Eccentric nearby resident whom Tom met in the 1st book. His most prominent characteristic is his practice of using unusual expletives ("Bless my dynamite cartridge!"), earning him the nickname of "the blessing man". An older man, Mr. Damon, deceased by the era of the Tom Swift Jr. series, is memorialized by having his name sentimentally attached to one of Tom Jr.'s inventions, the Damonscope radiation detector.
- Eradicate "Rad" Andrew Jackson Abraham Lincoln Sampson — An old black man who does freelance janitorial work for the Swifts. Provides comic relief in a very dated (Minstrel show) manner considered unacceptable today. Illiterate, Sampson once packed a gift from Tom to Mary in a leftover box labelled dynamite, an incident which is often referenced later. Despite the racially stereotyped behavior and pronunciation, he accompanies Tom on several of his adventures and demonstrates his loyalty and courage many times. He is often accompanied by his mule and a bucket of whitewash and long-handled brush.
- Andy Foger — The nearest thing in the first series to an arch-enemy. He is a boy about Tom's age whom Tom keeps running into (he almost ran into Tom Swift in Tom Swift and His Motor-Cycle), resulting in a rivalry between them extending over several volumes. Usually referred to by the narrator as a "bully", his antipathy to Tom sometimes approaches murderous extremes. Has money (legally or otherwise) and uses it to attempt to match Tom's public repute and fame. He usually comes to grief before the end of each novel.
- Koku — A giant who Tom picked up on a trip to Patagonia, he usually does work guarding the Swift place and engaging in heavy lifting as needed. Has a limited grasp of the English language.
- Mary Nestor — Tom's girlfriend and later wife; mother of Tom Swift Jr. and his sister Sandra. Tom and Mary's honeymoon was in one of Tom's inventions, his House on Wheels.
