= List of fictional primates in film =

This is a list of fictional primates in film, and is a subsidiary to the list of fictional primates. The list is restricted to notable non-human characters in live-action films including monkeys, lemurs, chimpanzees, gorillas, orangutans, and other primates.

Name	Species	Origin	Notes
Abu	Monkey	Aladdin	Aladdin's kleptomaniac pet monkey.
Aldo	Gorilla	Battle for the Planet of the Apes	The leader of the gorilla factions (and the ape revolution, by extension) during the rise of the ape society prior to humanity's downfall, as the "lowest species" of the planet.
Amy	Mountain gorilla	Congo	A gorilla which speaks using sign language and a translation device and accompanies an expedition into the Congo rainforest.
Ben	Chimpanzee	Primate	An adopted chimpanzee that suddenly becomes violent after being bitten by a rabid animal.
Blue Eyes	Chimpanzee	Dawn of the Planet of the Apes	Son of Caesar and Cornelia, older brother of Cornelius, the husband of Lake and the crown prince of Caesar's ape colony. After being manipulated by Koba and betraying his father by joining Koba, he later changes sides and helps his father in his reign until he is killed by Colonel McCollough together with his mother.
Bonzo	Chimpanzee	Bedtime for Bonzo	The subject of an attempt by a psychology professor (played by Ronald Reagan) to teach human morals to a chimpanzee in order to solve the "nature versus nurture" question.
Caesar	Chimpanzee	Planet of the Apes	The leader (and chief instigator) of the ape revolution in the fourth entry, Conquest of the Planet of the Apes, and the ruler of Ape City in the fifth and final film, Battle for the Planet of the Apes. He was portrayed in both movies by actor Roddy McDowall, who had also played Cornelius. In Rise of the Planet of the Apes and its two sequels, Caesar is the main protagonist with a role similar to the character in the original series. He is played by actor Andy Serkis.
Chee-Chee	Gorilla	Dolittle	A nervous friend of Doctor Dolittle's. Voiced by Rami Malek
Cheeta	Chimpanzee	Tarzan	A chimpanzee character appearing in numerous Hollywood Tarzan movies of the 1930s–1960s as well as the 1966–1968 television series, as the ape sidekick of the title character, Tarzan. Cheeta's role in these films is to provide comic relief, convey messages between Tarzan and his allies, and occasionally lead Tarzan's other animal friends to the ape-man's rescue.
Clyde	Orangutan	Every Which Way but Loose / Any Which Way You Can	An Orangutan won in a bet by Clint Eastwood's character, Philo Beddoe, who helps him out in fist fights and looking for love.
Cornelius	Chimpanzee	Planet of the Apes	A chimpanzee archeologist, as well as Zira's fiance and Caesar's father. He later meets and befriends the astronauts George Taylor and Brent. When the Earth is destroyed, He and Zira escape into the past with Taylor's spaceship. There he is killed by Dr. Otto Hasslein.
Cornelius	Chimpanzee	Dawn of the Planet of the Apes	The youngest son of Caesar and Cornelia and the brother of Blue Eyes. After their deaths he becomes the sole heir to Caesar's throne.
Cornelius II	Chimpanzee	Battle for the Planet of the Apes	The son of Caesar and his wife Lisa, named after his grandfather. After overhearing General Aldo and the gorillas planning to overthrow Caesar, he is killed by Aldo. His death later leads to Caesar killing Aldo out of revenge.
Dexter	Capuchin monkey	Night at the Museum	An exhibit at the American Museum of Natural History which often plays tricks on the protagonist Larry Daley.
George	Gorilla	Rampage	George is an extraordinarily intelligent silverback gorilla who has been in the care of the movie's protagonist since he was young
Gordy	Chimpanzee	Nope	A chimpanzee actor formerly starring in his own sitcom. One day he rampaged on the show's set, killing every actor except for the child actor Ricky "Jupe" Park before being killed by police forces. His story is likely loosely based on the real-life story of the chimpanzee Travis.
Jack	Capuchin monkey	Pirates of the Caribbean	Hector Barbossa's pet, mockingly named after Jack Sparrow and considered the meanest, most rotten-tempered simian in all of the Caribbean.
Jonny the Monkey	Monkey	Borat	Most famous celebrity in Kazakhstan, according to Borat
King Kong	Gorilla	King Kong	A giant gorilla-like monster that has appeared in several works since 1933. These include the 1933 movie, the film remakes of 1976 and 2005, as well as various sequels of the first two films. The character has become one of the world's most famous movie icons.
King Louie	Gigantopithecus	The Jungle Book	An ape who rules over monkeys, emulates humans and wishes to master firemaking. In contrast to the animated version, the live-action version is actually not an orangutan, but a Gigantopithecus.
Koba	Bonobo	Planet of the Apes	A former test animal often abused by humans. Once a close ally of Caesar during the Ape Rebellion, he later becomes his greatest enemy after seeing his respect towards humans, and leads the apes to war with humanity. He is also in some degree responsible for the spread of the Simian Flu that leads to millions of deaths and the near-extinction of the human species.
Link	Chimpanzee (played by an orangutan)	Link	An intelligent ape butler who goes on a rampage and kills several people. In the end, he is killed in a self-inflicted fire.
Manis	Orangutan	Cannonball Run II	An orangutan that can drive a car.
Mighty Joe Young	Gorilla	Mighty Joe Young (1949) / (1998)	An oversized gorilla in the care of Jill Young.
Mr. Nilsson	Squirrel monkey	Pippi Longstocking	The pet of the titular character.
Orange Juice	Orangutan	Life of Pi	An orangutan which is transported by ship from India to Canada, and may represent Pi's mother in the story.
Raffles	Chimpanzee	The Barefoot Executive	A pet chimpanzee with the ability to pick hit TV shows.
Spike	Capuchin monkey	Ace Ventura: Pet Detective	Ace's pet and sidekick.
Suzanne	Orangutan	Jay and Silent Bob Strike Back	An orangutan who is freed from a zoo by Jay and Silent Bob. Namesake of a test model of a chimpanzee's head named Suzanne (2002).
Ursus	Gorilla	Beneath the Planet of the Apes	Gorilla general from the ape city who plans to invade the Forbidden Zone.
Dr. Zaius	Orangutan	Planet of the Apes	An orangutan and although given a minor role devoid of dialogue in the novel, he becomes the main antagonist of the story in the subsequent film adaptation. Zaius was portrayed in the first and second films of the series by actor Maurice Evans.
Zira	Chimpanzee	Planet of the Apes	A chimpanzee scientist experimenting with humans, as well as Cornelius' fiance and Caesar's mother. She later meets and befriends the astronauts George Taylor and Brent. When the Earth is destroyed, she and Cornelius escape into the past with Taylor's spaceship. There she is killed by Dr. Otto Hasslein.
