= List of Tom Clancy's Op-Center characters =

There are many characters in the Tom Clancy's Op-Center franchise.

== Op-Center personnel ==
Paul Hood: Director of Op-Center and the former Mayor of Los Angeles. Used to be a banker. Nicknamed 'Pope Paul' because of his honesty. Quite often called 'Chief' by the rest of the Op-Center Team. Married with two children.

General Mike Rodgers: Deputy Director of Op-Center and commander of Op-Center's Military Branch, STRIKER. 2-Star General. He enlisted in the U.S. Army and later graduated from Officer Candidate School. His MOS was infantry. He first served in the Special Forces, popularly known as the Green Berets. He served two tours in Vietnam and later on helped Colonel Charlie Beckwith to create 1st Special Forces Operational Detachment-Delta (1st SFOD-D), popularly known as Delta Force. Rodgers fought in the Gulf War as a Mechanized brigade commander. He has a PHD in Military history from Temple University. He also serve as the Commander of the Regional Op-Center (ROC).

Robert 'Bob' Clayton Herbert: Chief of Intelligence. Disabled after losing his legs and his wife, Yvonne, in the 1983 U.S. embassy bombing.

Matthew Stoll: In-house computer genius. Finished at the top of MIT's classes for his and the previous two years. Worked for corporate America for a while, working on projects such as VCR systems and equipment for exercise machines. Good friend of NRO's Stephen Viens.

Darrel McCaskey: FBI and Interpol Liaison. Eventually marries Interpol agent Maria Corneja.

Lowell Coffey II: Attorney.

Stephen 'Bugs' Benet: Hood's Executive Assistant.

Dr. Phil Katzen: Biophysicist and civilian assigned to the ROC. Ex-Greenpeace

Ron Plummer: Deputy Director.

Martha Mackall: Political Liaison. Killed when she is gunned down in Spain on a diplomatic mission.

Dr. Liz Gordon: Staff Psychiatrist/Psychologist.

Ann Farris: Press Officer. Has a crush on Hood.

Jerry Wheeler: Chief Medical Officer.

Harlan Bellock: Chief Engineer. Graduated from Yale.

Warner Bicking: Assistant Deputy Director.

Karen Wong: Assistant Deputy Director.

Aideen Marley: Coffey's Deputy Assistant. Becomes a field operative.

Maria Corneja: Field Agent. Ex-Interpol. Later Maria Corneja McCaskey.

David Battat: Field Agent. Ex-CIA.

Lieutenant Colonel Charlie Squires: STRIKER. Ex-Field Commander of the STRIKERs. KIA during the Russian Conflict. On board a train as it derails.

Colonel Brett August: STRIKER. Field Commander of the STRIKERs appointed after Squires' death. Air Force pilot, transferred to Intelligence. Boyhood friend of Mike Rodgers.

Sergeant Chick Grey: STRIKER. Skilled marksman and parachutist. Second-in-Command of STRIKER. Ex-Delta Force where he excelled at HALO jumps as he could deploy the parachute later and land more accurately than any other. Capable of staring for a long time without blinking.

Private David George: STRIKER. Killed while parachuting into Kashmir.

Private Sondra DeVonne: STRIKER. Killed while parachuting into Kashmir.

Private First Class Walter Pupshaw: STRIKER. Killed while parachuting into Kashmir.

Private Terrance Newmeyer: STRIKER. Killed while parachuting into Kashmir.

Corporal Pat Prementine: STRIKER. Squad's Infantry tactics genius. Killed while parachuting into Kashmir.

Private Jason Scott: STRIKER. Killed while parachuting into Kashmir.

Private First Class Ishi Honda: STRIKER. Squad's Communications Operator. Later promoted to Corporal. Killed while parachuting into Kashmir.

Private Baas Moore: STRIKER. KIA during the North Korean conflict. Shot through the eye.

Private Walter Musicant: STRIKER. Medic.

General Morgan Carrie: Director of Op-Center appointed to replace Paul Hood when he is appointed as Special Intelligence Envoy to the President. Three Star General.

== Allies of Op-Center ==
Stephen Viens: Head of a section within the National Reconnaissance Office. Eventually hired by Op-Center.

== Other ==
Sharon Hood: Paul Hood's wife.

Alexander Hood: Paul Hood's son.

Harleigh Hood: Paul Hood's daughter

Mala Chatterjee: UN Secretary General and Ally of Op-Center during State of Siege
