= List of After War Gundam X characters =

This is a list of fictional characters from the Japanese science fiction anime television series After War Gundam X.

== Protagonists ==
=== Freeden pilots and crew ===
Garrod Ran (ガロード・ラン, Garōdo Ran)
Voiced by: Wataru Takagi
The main character of the series, and a 15-year-old hot-headed boy who is skilled at Mobile Suit operation and espionage. He is initially hired to rescue Tiffa Adill from the Vulture ship Freeden, but upon realizing his employer only wanted to exploit her for her Newtype abilities, he later becomes part of the Freeden's crew. Though he is not a Newtype, Jamil notes that he has a natural instinct for piloting, as he is able to quickly adapt to new equipment or situations even under pressure. For much of the series, he nurses a fairly obvious crush on Tiffa but does not act, fearing that the Tiffa would be unnerved by his advances since she was denied most of her childhood. His love for her is what drives him to pilot the GX-9900 Gundam X, the GX-9900-DV Gundam X Divider, and later the GX-9901-DX Gundam Double X. At the end of the series, he and Tiffa go off together when the crew of the Freeden disband, wanting to forge their own future.
The GX-9900 Gundam X is a limited-production general-purpose mobile suit fielded at the end of the 7th Space War. Its most powerful armament is the Satellite Cannon, a microwave beam launcher capable of destroying a space colony in a single shot. In the present day, the Satellite Cannon is only usable if there is direct line of sight to the moon, as the moon facility is the only remaining functional transmitter. After Garrod's Gundam X is critically damaged in battle, it is modified into the GX-9900-DV Gundam X Divider, which removes the damaged-beyond-repair Satellite Cannon in favor of a thruster pack and the Divider, equipment that combines a shield, thrusters, and a multi-barrel beam weapon called the Harmonica. The Gundam X Divider ultimately better suits Garrod's piloting style, being more well-rounded and practical than the original configuration.
The GX-9901-DX Gundam Double X is a one-of-a-kind unit built by the New United Nations Earth using data from the Gundam X that Jamil Neate piloted during the war. Its most notable feature is the Twin Satellite Cannon system, which is more powerful and more efficient than the original Gundam X's cannon, capable of firing multiple volleys before needing to recharge. The Twin Satellite Cannon retains the need to have direct line of sight with the moon in order to fire.
Tiffa Adill (ティファ・アディール, Tifa Adīru)
Voiced by: Mika Kanai
A mysterious Newtype girl who demonstrates clairvoyance. She is "rescued" by Garrod from the Freeden, but later joins the crew together with Garrod. She is quiet and shy because of what she has seen, and is a frequent target for kidnapping due to her abilities. Thanks to Garrod and the Freeden crew, she begins to open up, and eventually falls in love with Garrod. Although she has paranormal abilities, she does not consider herself a Newtype. As part of the Freeden crew, she uses her abilities to search for other Newtypes, communicating her visions with charcoal sketches. In Gundam X, she and Garrod have two character songs each.
Jamil Neate (ジャミル・ニート, Jamiru Nīto)
Voiced by: Ken'yū Horiuchi
The 30-year-old captain of the Freeden, a Vulture ship. He was once a Newtype pilot of the old United Nations Earth who piloted a Gundam X in the 7th Space War and fired the shot that changed history. The trauma of this event caused him to lose his Newtype abilities and develop a "cockpit phobia" that prevents him from piloting mobile suits. In the present day, he searches the Earth for Newtypes to rescue and protect, wanting to prevent them from being exploited like the Newtypes of his time. Late in the series, he overcomes his cockpit phobia and begins piloting the GX-9900-DV Gundam X Divider after Garrod obtains the Gundam Double X. He holds lingering feelings for fellow Newtype Lucille Lilliant. After the Freeden crew disbands, Jamil partners with Sala Tyrrell and works as a liaison between the Earth governments and the space colonies.
Techcs Farzenberg (テクス・ファーゼンバーグ, Tekusu Fāzenbāgu)
Voiced by: Hiroshi Naka
Freeden's physician, well versed in numerous disciplines from psychology to 20th-century European poetry. His other interests are equally varied, and include coffee and billiards, with him frequently sneaking into the Freeden's lounge for practice. After the crew parts ways, he continues to practice medicine in field hospitals, mediating between soldiers from different sides.
Roybea Loy (ロアビィ・ロイ, Roabī Roi)
Voiced by: Takumi Yamazaki
The 18-year-old pilot of the GT-9600 Gundam Leopard and its upgraded form GT-9600-D Gundam Leopard Destroy. Originally, he was only hired to do one job for the Freeden, but he later takes a more permanent position as one of her defenders. Seemingly a shameless skirt chaser at first glance, Roybea cares deeply for every woman he has ever fallen for and is always sensitive to a woman's feelings. Humorously, Roybea also displays the ability to accurately gauge a woman's clothing sizes with just a glance. He won his Gundam in a bet with a woman he considered his true love. Roybea nurses a crush on Sala for most of the series, but she rejects him before the final encounter because of her feelings for Jamil. Six months after the Freeden crew returns from space, he and Ennil El are implied to become a couple and are last seen moving to Witz's hometown.
The GT-9600 Gundam Leopard is a heavy ground assault unit. It is armed with numerous weapons, most notably a large rotary cannon mounted on the left arm. When the Freeden travels across the ocean, the Leopard, lacking aerial capability, is modified for underwater combat with a propulsion unit/torpedo launcher mounted on the back. The GT-9600-D Gundam Leopard Destroy replaces the single rotary cannon with two smaller yet more powerful multi-barrel weapons that fit over the hands and adds more weapons such as a shoulder-mounted missile pod.
Toniya Malme (トニヤ・マーム, Toniya Māmu)
Voiced by: Kotono Mitsuishi
Freeden's 17-year-old bridge operator in charge of communications. In contrast to her crewmate Sala, she is a free-spirited woman who is fashion-conscious and sensitive. She quickly becomes friends with Ennil El at Saint's Island, and although she invites her to join the Freeden, it would take some time for Ennil to join forces. Before the final battle near the lunar base, Witz proposes to her. Six months after the battle, Witz takes her to his hometown, where they become neighbors with Roybea and Ennil.
Shingo Mori (シンゴ・モリ, Shingo Mori)
Voiced by: Daiki Nakamura
The Freeden helmsman, who can also be found working in supply procurement, salvaging, guard duty, and trade negotiations. It is said that he is able to pilot even a spacecraft simply by reading the manual.
Kid Salsamille (キッド・サルサミル, Kiddo Sarusamiru)
Voiced by: Motoko Kumai
The Freeden chief mechanic, and a self-styled technical genius at the age of 12. He strives for high quality and professionalism in his work, and will push himself and his subordinates to work beyond exhaustion. He consistently refers to Garrod as "Gundam Boy", initially an insult that turns into a friendly nickname. Despite his professionalism when at work, he is also impulsive with a constant urge to tinker with mobile suits and other machines. His grand ideas, however, lead to powerful upgrades for the Freeden Gundam complement, particularly the Gundam X Divider and Gundam Leopard Destroy. At the series' close, he, along with Shingo, Pala, and his two subordinates Lokoko and Nine open a repair shop and salvage yard called "Freeden III".
Witz Sou (ウィッツ・スー, Wittsu Sū)
Voiced by: Kazuya Nakai
The 17-year-old pilot of the GW-9800 Gundam Airmaster and its upgraded form GW-9800-B Gundam Airmaster Burst. Like Roybea, he initially has a one-time contract with the Freeden but eventually joins the crew on a permanent basis. He uses the money gained from his work as a mercenary to support his family, though his mother disapproves of him being a Vulture and mobile suit pilot because his father was killed by a mobile suit. Hotheaded by nature, he holds feelings for Toniya despite their constant bickering and proposes to her before the final battle at the Moon. Six months after the battle, he returns to his hometown with Toniya, now his fiancée, and discovers that Roybea and Ennil will be their neighbors.
The GW-9800 Gundam Airmaster is a transformable mobile suit specializing in air combat. It can freely shift modes between mobile suit and aircraft configurations and is armed with twin beam rifles. The upgraded GW-9800-B Gundam Airmaster Burst is more maneuverable thanks to added thrusters and adds a few beam cannons in fighter mode, but otherwise retains the same weapons.
Sala Tyrrell (サラ・タイレル, Sara Taireru)
Voiced by: Yumi Kakazu
Freeden's 19-year-old bridge operator in charge of the sensors and hangar, and second-in-command to Jamil. She has a straightforward, by-the-book attitude that projects a rather stern image, particularly involving Tiffa, as Jamil often focuses on her due to her Newtype abilities. She does, however, grow to become fond of Tiffa when she sees her abilities help protect the Freeden from danger. She confesses her feelings to Jamil before the final encounter with D.O.M.E. and is last seen as his partner during peace negotiations between the Earth Sphere government and the space colonies.

== Recurring characters ==
=== New United Nations Earth ===
Shagia Frost (シャギア・フロスト, Shagia Furosuto)
Voiced by: Toshiyuki Morikawa
The elder of the twin Frost brothers, working for the New United Nations Earth as a spy. He pilots the NRX-0013 Gundam Virsago and its upgraded form NRX-0013-CB Gundam Virsago Chest Break. He has been under the care of the UNE Newtype Laboratory from his youth, and while he trained with recognized Newtypes, his telepathic ability was not compatible with the Flash System, only being able to telepathically communicate with his brother Olba, and so the lab designated him as "Category F" along with his brother. As a result, he made it his personal mission to eliminate any Newtype candidate that the UNE government ordered him to find out of revenge against the people who would not recognize his power. His thirst for revenge eventually turns into a desire to plunge the world into another destructive war, wanting to rebuild it with him and his brother as its rulers. Cold and ruthless, he is also deeply committed to his cause, and will stop at nothing for its success. He and his brother seemingly perish in their final confrontation with Garrod, but are seen briefly at the end with Shagia in a wheelchair.
The NRX-0013 Gundam Virsago is a unique mobile suit featuring extendable arms and a sonic cannon mounted in the abdomen. The NRX-0013-CB Gundam Virsago Chest Break upgrade is tuned for use and space and features a more powerful sonic cannon as well as the ability to combine with the NRX-0015-HC Gundam Ashtaron Hermit Crab and form the Satellite Launcher weapon. The Satellite Launcher is equal in power to the Gundam Double X's Twin Satellite Cannon.
He appears as the pilot of the Gundam Virsago in arcade game Mobile Suit Gundam: Gundam vs. Gundam.
Olba Frost (オルバ・フロスト, Oruba Furosuto)
Voiced by: Nozomu Sasaki
The younger of the twin Frost brothers, also working for the New United Nations Earth. He pilots the NRX-0015 Gundam Ashtaron and its upgraded form NRX-0015-HC Gundam Ashtaron Hermit Crab. Although he tries to assume the same attitude as his brother, he is notably more bloodthirsty and aggressive due to feeling a sense of superiority towards others. He is utterly devoted to his brother Shagia, and will usually obey his orders even if his emotions get the better of him. Like his brother, he was considered a "Category F" Newtype because of his incompatibility with the Flash System, his sole Newtype ability being to telepathically communicate with his brother regardless of the distance between them. He and Shagia apparently die after their duel with Garrod, but it is later shown that they survived, with Shagia in a wheelchair and Olba standing next to him.
The NRX-0015 Gundam Ashtaron is capable of changing between mobile suit and mobile armor modes, with its main armament being a pair of giant claws mounted on the back assembly. The upgraded NRX-0015-HC Gundam Ashtaron Hermit Crab is tuned for space combat and is able to combine with the NRX-0013-CB Gundam Virsago Chest Break to form the Satellite Launcher weapon.
Olba makes a brief appearance in arcade game Mobile Suit Gundam: Gundam vs. Gundam as Ashtaron, featured as Virsago's usable weapon (where Ashtaron holds the Gundam X to let Virsago deliver the finishing blow) and Virsago's Mobile Armor mode (Ashtaron carries Virsago to increase travelling speed and length); through never shown, Olba appears in the game when Virsago is the last unit to be destroyed.
Nozomu Sasaki stated in an interview that after using "Nii-san" (Older brother) so many times during the series, he has developed an aversion to the word.
Fixx Bloodman (フィクス・ブラッドマン, Fikusu Buraddoman)
Voiced by: Shin Aomori
The leader of newly-formed New United Nations Earth. Although he says he does not want to repeat the mistakes of the past, he is only interested in war, believing himself the only man fit to rule the world. The Frost brothers work for him but in truth he is manipulated by them. He was killed by Frost brothers' Satellite Cannon after learning the truth of Newtypes from D.O.M.E.
Aimzat Kartral (アイムザット・カートラル, Aimuzatto Kātoraru)
Voiced by: Unshou Ishizuka
The UNE Intelligence Minister who is the Frost brothers' superior at the start of the series. He deeply believes that Newtypes are the way to greater power for humanity, and has tried to further this view among his superiors in the UNE Reconstruction Committee. He leads the Gundam Double X's development, but the suit is stolen by Garrod (with the help of Jamil, Tiffa and Kattok). After losing the Gundam Double X, the Frost brothers execute him, stating that he has outlived his usefulness.

=== Space Revolutionary Army ===
Lancerow Dawell (ランスロー・ダーウェル, Ransurō Dāweru)
Voiced by: Hiroshi Takemura
An officer and Mobile Suit ace in the SRA during the 7th Space War, he was the arch-rival of Jamil Neate. Like Jamil, the trauma of the colony drops during the war caused him to lose his Newtype abilities. After meeting Tiffa, he tries, to no avail, to persuade SRA President Seidel Rasso not to use certain superweapons against the resistance group Satyricon. Seidel's stubbornness, along with the death of his friend Nichola Fafas, causes him to question his involvement in the war. In the end, he leads the SRA's peace delegations with the New UNE. During the war, Lancerow piloted the RMSN-002 Febral, a unique Newtype-use mobile suit specialized for space combat. In the present day, he pilots the RMS-019R Crouda Lancerow Custom.
Seidel Rasso (ザイデル・ラッソ, Zaideru Rasso)
Voiced by: Kazuhiko Kishino
The president of the SRA and also the leader of Newtypism, a cult that forwards the view that all Spacenoids are Newtypes and are an evolved form of humanity superior to Earth-born "Oldtypes." To this end, he tries to suppress the fact that Tiffa is a Newtype to his people, as the fact that she is Earth-born would upend Newtypism's entire ideology. He also derides Lancerow as a "former" Newtype and often dismisses his counsel on that fact alone. His target is to conquer Earth and for this he tries to contact D.O.M.E. in the lunar base, because he knows the ultimate secret of Newtypes. He is killed by Frost brothers' Satellite Cannon soon after encountering D.O.M.E., cursing "Oldtypes" to the end.
Nicola Fafas (二コラ・ファファス, Nikora Fafasu)
Voiced by: Hideyuki Umezu
A SRA officer who kidnaps Tiffa and brings her to the colonies. He is a friend of Lancerow Dawell and like him he begins to question Seidel's motives. Because of this, he is arrested and executed for sedition.

=== Other ===
Pala Sys (パーラ・シス, Pāra Shisu)
Voiced by: Miki Nagasawa
Pala is a member of the space colony resistance group "Satyricon", and the pilot of the GS-9900 G-Falcon. She is a loudmouthed, tomboyish orphan, and one of the first children born after the colony drop that ended the 7th Space War. She is the only person her age in Satyricon, and as such, she takes an immediate liking to Garrod when he is brought to the asteroid base. When Garrod accepts the rebels' offer to repair the Double X, she makes him her partner, as the G-Falcon has the ability to dock with most Gundam-type Mobile Suits. At the end of the series, she and the rest of the Freeden engineering crew open up a repair shop.
Carris Nautilus (カリス・ノーティラス, Karisu Nōtirasu)
Voiced by: Yuko Mizutani
An artificial Newtype whose goal is to bring peace to a united world. For this goal he assists Nomoa Long in his attempt to use the mobile armor Patulia. Because he is an artificial Newtype, he regularly suffers from a condition called "Synapse Syndrome", where he experiences crippling pain akin to a terrible death. He feels a kinship to Tiffa as he considers both of them Newtypes despite her rejection of the term. Initially he defeats Garrod with the RMSN-008 Bertigo, severely damaging the Gundam X, but is later defeated when Garrod fields the repaired and upgraded Gundam X Divider. After the New United Nations Earth is established, he joins an anti-UNE militia in the North American continent, later intercepting a convoy carrying the Freeden Gundams and rescuing the Vulture crew. He later takes part in the final battle and becomes a peace ambassador for his country.
Ennil El (エニル・エル, Eniru Eru)
Voiced by: Chieko Honda
The 19-year-old daughter of deceased SRA Major General Nada El. She and her father were stranded on Earth at the end of the war and after he died, she developed a hatred of those living on the planet. She became a mercenary with a preference for blue mobile suits and has numerous run-ins with the Freeden crew, at one point assisting in the Patulia project. She develops feelings for Garrod, though he rejects her at gunpoint when he believes her advances to be an attempt to take advantage of him, which causes her to develop a deep resentment towards him. After the Patulia is destroyed, she wanders to Saint's Island where she opens a restaurant called "Lilac" and attracts the eye of Miles Goodman. But she finds that she could not escape her violent past, and ends up leaving after learning her new friend Toniya is a Freeden crew member. Eventually she joins the Freeden, and at the end of the series she travels to Witz's hometown together with Roybea.
D.O.M.E. (ドーム, Dōmu)
Voiced by: Yutaro Mitsuoka
A mysterious entity which controls a facility on the Moon that contains the Satellite System that powers the Satellite Cannon weapons of the Gundam X, Gundam Double X and unmanned GX-Bit mobile suits. His name is an acronym for "Depths Of Mind Elevating", also the name of the lunar base itself. He reveals the truth about himself and Newtypes to the Freeden crew and the leaders of New United Nations Earth and the Space Revolutionary Army. As one of the first known Newtypes, his body was experimented on and dissected by the old United Nations Earth government, with his consciousness being incorporated into the lunar base's systems. Though his body is gone, his Newtype abilities are so great that he can control the entirety of the base on his own, including a complement of unmanned FX-9900-D G-Bit D.O.M.E. units, as well as telepathically communicate with others over vast distances. The lunar facility is destroyed in the final clash between Garrod and the Frost brothers, presumably ending D.O.M.E's existence.
It was initially planned that the D.O.M.E. would be voiced by Toru Furuya, the voice actor of Amuro Ray, but Furuya turned down the offer. Furuya would later portray Ribbons Almark in Mobile Suit Gundam 00, which would be the first time he portrayed a Gundam character other than Amuro.
Yutaro Mistuoka is also the series narrator.
Nomoa Long (ノモア・ロング, Nomoa Rongu), AKA Professor Dorat (ドーラット博士, Dōratto Hakase)
Voiced by: Kazuhiro Nakata
Mayor of Fort Severn. He was actually a leader of the SRA infiltration plot called "Operation Lilac", in which a team of Newtypes with RMSN-008 Bertigos and the Mobile Armor Patulia assault major UNE targets on the Earth. The plan had failed however, and with only one Bertigo and the Patulia at his disposal, he spent fifteen years perfecting the artificial Newtype technology in the hope of one day exacting his revenge on the Earth.
Von Alternative (フォン・アルタネイティヴ, Fon Arutaneitivu)
Voiced by: Yuzuru Fujimoto
Director of the Alternative laboratory, where Jamil originally finds Tiffa Adell. He is exploitative, as demonstrated by his attitude toward Tiffa, and by his willingness to dispose of his mercenaries, the Frost brothers, with the SRA Mobile Armor MA-06 Grandine.
Reich Anto (ライク・アント, Raiku Anto)
Voiced by: Minoru Inaba
An Alternative laboratory agent who hired Garrod to recover Tiffa from the Freeden.

=== Vultures ===
Zakott Dattonel (ザコット・ダットネル, Zakotto Dattoneru)
Voiced by: Tohru Furusawa
The leader of a Vulture group apparently specializing in incendiary weapons. He is initially Ennil El's partner, and a reckless scavenger, sending his Mobile Suit riders into defunct UNE power plants despite their tendency to explode.
Grits Joe (グリーツ・ジョー, Gurītsu Jō)
Voiced by: Keiji Fujiwara
Rosa Intenso (ローザ・インテンソ, Rōza Intenso)
Voiced by: Narumi Hidaka
Rosso Aramant (ロッソ・アラマント, Rosso Aramanto)
Voiced by: Kunihiko Yasui
These three Vulture captains are old friends of Jamil's, and were recruited by him to help rescue Tiffa from the Alternative laboratory after she was recaptured by Olba Frost.

=== Renegade Mobile Suit riders ===
Krokka (クロッカ, Kurokka)
Voiced by: Tohru Furusawa
This is the pilot of the Mobile Suit in episode 1 that was thrown to the civilians. His suit was captured by Garrod undamaged, and himself was being thrown into ground, where furious civilians were waiting for him.
Vedoba Morte (ヴェドバ・モルテ, Vedoba Morute)
Voiced by: Masako Katsuki
In episode 2, she is the first Mobile Suit rider to discover the GX. Her suit was heavily damaged by the Gundam X in combat, and she was killed by other Vultures who were hunting for the Gundam X.

=== Orcs ===
Doza Bale
Voiced by: Nobuo Tobita
The Orc captain of the Sea Castle and the primary producer and distributor of the D-Navi, an underwater navigation system that uses the brains of dolphins. He becomes obsessed with capturing the Freeden Gundams after he discovers them rescuing Tiffa during a hunt for dolphins. He also holds an obsession with capturing a white dolphin determined to have Newtype abilities, believing it would make a more powerful D-Navi. He and his entire crew are killed when the Gundam Leopard, modified for underwater use, sinks his ship.
Marcus Guy
Voiced by: Tohru Furusawa
An Orc submarine captain who was hired by Olba Frost to salvage several G-Bits on the ocean floor in the region called the "Sea of Lorelei". He and Olba discover Lucille Lilliant encased in the L System, a device that deactivates electrical systems within a large radius by amplifying a Flash System-compatible Newtype's power. The Frost brothers execute him and his crew to prevent information leakage.

=== Civilians ===
Miles Goodman
Voiced by: Dai Matsumoto
The son of the Saint's Island Immigration Bureau director and one of the immigration officers. He strikes up a relationship with Ennil El when she moves to the island in an attempt to run away from her violent past. He plans to ask her to marry him when she leaves the island, unable to move on from her hatred. When the New United Earth government takes Saint Island, he and all government members are unceremoniously executed.
