= List of Mobile Suit Gundam AGE characters =

This is a list of fictional characters from the Japanese anime television series, Mobile Suit Gundam AGE and its side spinoff manga. Mobile Suit Gundam AGE is the twelfth TV series of the Gundam media franchise.

== Earth Federation ==
=== Asuno Family ===
Flit Asuno (フリット・アスノ, Furitto Asuno)
Voiced by: Toshiyuki Toyonaga (young), Kazuhiko Inoue (adult) (Japanese); Sarah Houser (young), Leon Hill (adult) (English)
The first main protagonist of Gundam AGE, he was born the same day as the war with the Vagans, called at the time the "Unknown Enemies" began, also known as "The Day the Angel Fell". While he was still young, Flit and his family were attacked by the UE's at their home colony. It was during this attack that his dying mother provided him with control unit and schematics for the Gundam, leading Flit to spend years developing the "Legendary Mobile Suit" and devotes himself toward the defense of humanity and the defeat of the UEs. He is 14 years old at the start of his story just after his mobile suit, the Gundam AGE-1 is completed. Since the battle at Nora, he has developed precognitive abilities. He latter discovers this is because he is a special type of human called an "X-Rounder", and played a key role at the invasion of the UE's secret base at the Ambat Fortress, where their true origin is revealed.
During the 25 years after the battle at Ambat, Flit rose among the ranks of the Earth Federation Forces to the position of Vice Admiral in the war against the Vagans, assuming command of the Military Orbital Station "Big Ring", which is the Federation's last line of defense. He also married his childhood friend Emily and had two children, Asemu and Yunoa with her. After Yurin's death, Flit started loathing the Vagans for waging war against the rest of mankind giving no options for a peace talk, vowing to destroy them all if necessary to put an end to the conflict. During the second Arc, it is shown not only that Flit still excels as a pilot, occasionally assisting his son in battle, but also proves himself as a skilled tactician, successfully leading the Earth Forces to repel the Vagan offensive in several occasions. After exposing the Vagan conspiration involving the Earth Government, Flit kept ascending into the military, reaching the post of commander-in-chief of the Federation Forces before retiring.
Upon the Vagan surprise attack on Earth, Flit activates the Gundam AGE-3 and entrusts it to his only grandson Kio. Despite having already retired, Flit uses his influence to have the Diva recommissioned and becomes his own base of operations against the Vagans. Due to its new captain Natola Einus' lack of experience and confidence, Flit acts as the de facto commander of the ship while teaching her to perform her duties properly. Upon learning that his son Asemu has faked his death and joined the Bisidian Pirates, he starts shunning him, claiming he does not have a son anymore, although he agrees with Asemu's plan to allow him lead the mission to rescue Kio after he is captured by the Vagans. Upon reuniting with his son and grandson, Flit rejects their claims that the Vagans should be spared for the sake of ending the war peacefully, as he still has the belief that Earth will only be able to find true peace after having the Vagans all but destroyed and extinct. However, when Flit has the chance to wipe out the main Vagan colony "Second Moon" with a WMD, he is dissuaded by Kio and manages to rally friends and foes alike to prevent its destruction by a rampaging Vagan Gear, effectively putting an end to the war. Decades later, Flit is regarded by history as a savior, not only because he managed to unite both factions in a single cause, but the technology obtained from the AGE System developed by him helped mankind to complete the terraformation of Mars and thus creating enough space for the sustainment of its entire population.
Asemu Asuno (アセム・アスノ, Asemu Asuno)
Voiced by: Takuya Eguchi (young), Kōsuke Toriumi (adult) (Japanese); Mike Rogers (English)
The second main protagonist and the son of Flit and Emily. Just like his father he is a mobile suit enthusiast who dedicates himself to building his own machines with his friends. He was entrusted with the key to the Gundam by his father on his 17th birthday and later he joins the military, piloting the recently completed Gundam AGE-2 as part of Woolf's mobile suit squad. He has a natural talent as a mobile suit pilot but proves not to have inherited his father's X-Rounder powers, leading to an inferiority complex. At one stage he steals a Vagan helmet designed to bring out X-rounder capabilities but is unable to take the strain and ends up unconscious.
After his commander Woolf dies while saving him in battle, Asemu takes heed of his last words and commits to being the best pilot in space, X-rounder or not. His anger leads to a new level of power which even Zeheart cannot estimate and he defeats Desil Galette with ease. Asemu then continues to make up for his lack of special powers by perfecting his piloting skills and depending upon the Gundam's potential. After the battle of Nortrum and many successful Vegan battles, Asemu becomes captain of the Earth Special Forces and marries his former schoolmate Romary Stone. As a final tribute to Woolf, the AGE-2 is painted all white and Asemu takes up the wearing of his mentor's uniform.
10 years later, Asemu witnesses the birth of his son Kio before departing on a mission to search for a missing warship. During the mission, he battled the giant Mobile Armor SID, which was guarding the EXA-DB, an ancient database with military weaponry data from before the Silver Chalice Treaty. Severely injured when the AGE-2 was virtually destroyed by SID's beams, he was rescued by the Bisidian space pirates and chose to embrace the life of a Space Pirate with the ulterior motive of battling the corruption of the Federation and keeping the balance of power between both sides in the conflict. The AGE-2 was rebuilt into the AGE-2 Dark Hound but without the AGE system, which was found by the Federation floating in space. Subsequently Asemu is listed as MIA by the Federation, and Kio grows up believing his father to be dead.
13 Years later, Asemu reappears before his father and his son in the Diva, with a completely changed appearance and using the alias of Captain Ash of the Bisidian's Baronoke. He launches an attack on the Diva to measure its strength and claim the AGE System for himself if its crew does not prove itself worthy of it. Upon confirming that the AGE System is in good hands, Asemu entrusts to Kio a capsule containing a message to the Diva crew revealing the existence of EXA-DB. Upon learning of his son's capture, Asemu departs to Vagan with his crew and rescues him. After a brief reunion with his family, Asemu informs Flit that his true objective leading the Bisidians is to ensure that neither the Earth Federation nor the Vagans gain the upper hand, forcing a stalemate in an attempt to have both sides come to terms.
During the trip towards La Gramis, the crew of the Baronoke observe a battle and decide to investigate before joining the rest in the final battle. They re-encounter SID at the battle zone, battling Zeheart in Gundam Legilis. Asemu again works together with Zeheart to destroy SID before heading into the asteroid containing the EXA-DB. As Zeheart tries to take the treasure however, the Baronoke fired upon the asteroid according to Asemu's previous orders, destroying the EXA-DB. Surprisingly, Zeheart again chooses to spare Asemu in the disabled Dark Hound, content to have grasped the true power of the Gundam Legilis but vowing to face Asemu again.
In the final battle, Asemu encounters a deranged Zeheart attacking Kio. Despite his far less powerful suit, Asemu quickly disables Legilis before attempting to rescue Zeheart. His oldest friend speaks to him one last time before pushing him away, choosing to perish as the Legilis explodes. Zeheart's death only strengthens Asemu's desire to end the war.
Kio Asuno (キオ・アスノ, Kio Asuno)
Voiced by: Kazutomi Yamamoto (Japanese); Gloria Ansell (English)
The main third protagonist, he is Flit's grandson and the only child of Asemu and Romary. Kio received mobile suit training since childhood without knowing by playing a combat simulator he received from his grandfather. When the Vagan invasion began, Flit entrusts him with his last creation, the Gundam AGE-3. Kio is also an X-Rounder and according to his grandfather, his powers are stronger than those of anyone he has met before, having the potential to bring an end to the war with the Vagans. Upon learning from Flit that Bisidian's leader is his father, he is instructed by his grandfather to forget about him, although he is eager to learn more about him. Soon after, Kio is captured along his Gundam during a joint operation between Zeheart Gallete and fellow Vagan commander Zanald Beyhard and sent to Vagan under custody of their leader Ezelcant, where he learns of the harsh reality of the people in Vagan and Ezelcant's true intentions, until being rescued by the Bisidian space pirates led by Asemu.
Upon his return to the Federation, Kio starts piloting another mobile suit developed to keep up with his enhanced X-Rounder abilities, the Gundam AGE-FX, whose precision allows him to defeat enemy mobile suits without killing its pilots, allowing him to follow his newfound resolve to make no casualties among the Vagans, while protecting his comrades at the same time. Despite his crew members advice, he felt that his way was the path to end the war.
Marina Asuno (マリナ・アスノ, Marina Asuno)
Voiced by: Ayumi Tsunematsu
Flit's mother, killed by a Vagan attack when Flit is still a child.
Emily Asuno (エミリー・アスノ, Emirī Asuno)
Voiced by: Aya Endō (Japanese); Elizabeth Loennborn (English)
Born Emily Amonde (エミリー・アモンド, Emirī Amondo), childhood friend of Flit Asuno who met him when he first moved to Nora, later she becomes his wife and gives birth to their children Asemu and Yunoa.
Romary Asuno (ロマリー・アスノ, Romarī Asuno)
Voiced by: Kana Hanazawa (Japanese); Gloria Ansell (English)
Born Romary Stone (ロマリー・ストーン, Romarī Sutoon), she was a schoolmate and close friend of Asemu and Zehart during their high school days. She was devastated when she learned that Zeheart was a Vagan spy, but despite that, she decided to join the military with Asemu, serving as an operator at Diva's command bridge. Later she quits the military and marries Asemu, giving birth to Kio some years later.
Yunoa Asuno (ユノア・アスノ, Yunoa Asuno)
Voiced by: Asuka Ōgame, (teenager), Aya Endo (adult) (Japanese); Terri Oliver (English)
Flit and Emily's daughter and Asemu's younger sister. When Kio becomes a member of Diva's mobile suit squad, she also joins its crew as a physician, becoming Wendy's teacher.

=== Crew of Diva ===
==== First Generation ====
Grodek Ainoa (グルーデック・エイノア, Gurūdekku Einoa)
Voiced by: Hiroki Tōchi (Japanese); Dave Bridges (English)
An officer of the Earth Federation Forces who took over command of the warship Diva for himself by forging military credentials and subduing its captain after learning that their orders were to abandon Nora's inhabitants to UE's mercy. Despite helping evacuate the colonists to safety, Grodek has a prison warrant on him due to his insubordination, a fact he hides from his crew mates. His true intentions are to make use of Diva and the Gundam to attack the UE's base in vengeance for his wife and daughter's deaths during "The day the Angel Fell". In the occasion, Grodek succeeds to kill Gerra Doi, the responsible for the destruction of his home colony in front of his son, Arabel.
After the fall of Ambat, Grodek took the responsibility for his and his comrades' insubordination and was sentenced to prison. After his sentence ends, he contacts Flit, claiming he had found evidence about conspirators from Earth supporting the Vagans. However, he is stabbed to death by Arabel before he is able to deliver it, sending him the data from his phone with his last ounce of strength.
Millais Alloy (ミレース・アロイ, Mirēs Aroi)
Voiced by: Yu Shimamura (Japanese); Terri Oliver (English)
A female officer on board the Diva who serves under Grodek Ainoa during the siege of Ambat, later becoming the Diva's captain.
Vargas Dyson (バルガス・ダイソン, Barugasu Daison)
Voiced by: Naoki Bandou (Japanese); Michael Brooks (English)
Emily's Grandfather and the co-developer of the Gundam AGE-1. He also serves as an expert mechanic, who makes several upgrades to the Earth Federal Forces's mobile suits.
Dique Gunhale (ディケ・ガンヘイル, Dike Ganheiru)
Voiced by: Shintaro Ohata (Japanese); Michael Pizzuto (young), David Lee Mckinney (adult) (English)
Classmate of Flit and Emily who accompanied them on Diva. Later he joins the Diva crew as chief mechanic in Vargas' place.
Largan Drace (ラーガン・ドレイス, Rāgan Doreisu)
Voiced by: Wataru Hatano
A mobile suit pilot of the Earth Federal Forces, who pilots the RGE-B790 Genoace. He was supposed to be the pilot for the Gundam until he was injured during the UE's attack at Nora.
Woolf Enneacle (ウルフ・エニアクル, Urufu Eniakuru)
Voiced by: Daisuke Ono (Japanese); Richard Magarey (English)
An ace mobile suit pilot who started his career as a racer in the mobile suit Grand Prix. After defeating all of his opponents in the Grand Prix, he states he got bored and wanted more challenges and so joined the Federation as a mobile suit pilot. Woolf can be described as a vain, egocentric person who works at being the "cool guy." He often makes references to his sense of smell and animal instincts, playing off the "wolf" pronunciation of his name and the character he portrays. As a play on his nickname "White Wolf" he insists that his mobile suits be white in color. He is also impatient and a flirt; after waking up on the Diva, he kept pressing everyone about what was happening, though not bothering to listen, as well as hitting on Millais Alloy, despite her continually rejecting him. However Woolf is not a heartless person, as when he and the young Flit Asuno were attacked by the UE, he risked his life to give Flit a chance to escape and warn the rest of the crew, showing that he does care about his comrades. He pilots the RGE-B790CW Genoace Custom and later, he becomes the leader of Diva's mobile suit squad, piloting the more advanced WMS-GEX1 G-Exes. 25 years later, Woolf is shown piloting the G-Bouncer and is Rank Major. He is killed in the battle of Nortram when he stands between Asemu and Desil Galette, receiving a fatal blow from the latter.

==== Second Generation ====
Arisa Gunhale (アリーサ・ガンヘイル, Arīsa Ganheiru)
Voiced by: Ami Koshimizu (Japanese); Jessica Borja (English)
Dique's daughter and a mobile suit pilot member serving in Woolf's team with Asemu.
Max Hartway (マックス・ハートウェイ, Makkusu Hātowei)
Voiced by: Daisuke Sakaguchi
A pilot serving under Woolf's team. Rank second lieutenant.
Obright Lorain (オブライト・ローレイン, Oburaito Rōrein)
Voiced by: Kōji Yusa
A mobile suit pilot assigned to the Diva-class's mobile suit forces under Woolf Enneacle's command. Rank Lieutenant. During the Vagan attack on Earth, he returns to the Diva, serving under Seric Abis, piloting an upgraded version of his Genoace II instead of the Clanche like the rest of his team mates. After the death of Remi, he chose not to progress through the ranks, being content instead to serve upon the Diva, which he had come to consider his home and family. As an experienced veteran pilot however he was an important part of the Abis team. His story ended in the penultimate episode of the series. After destroying Leil in his customized Ghirarga he faced Fram Nara in the Fawn Farsia after she killed Jonathan. After he dismembered the Farsia, Fram managed to penetrate his cockpit with a beam sabre, fatally wounding him. Obright still managed to damage Fram's cockpit in the same way, before dying with a promise to see Remi again after waiting so long. His sacrifice immobilized the Fawn Farsia and he was vaporised along with Fram and his beloved Diva in the final blast of the digamozeon cannon, allowing the Gundam trio to escape.
Remi Ruth (レミ・ルース, Remi Rūsu)
Voiced by: Ayane Sakura
A mechanic working in Diva and Obright's love interest who accepted his marriage proposal. She dies from shrapnel injuries trying to protect Diva from a member of the Magician 8 after performing an emergency maintenance on its main cannon.

==== Third Generation ====
Natola Einus (ナトーラ・エイナス, Natōra Einasu)
Voiced by: Rina Satō (Japanese); Elizabeth Loennborn (English)
A recently promoted captain appointed to command the Diva after it is reinstated into duty. Due to her lack of experience and confidence, she is usually berated by her subordinates, and scolded by Flit when she makes a mistake, although he admits that she has the skills and will to become a worthy captain with proper training. Eventually Natola manages to live up to the task, thanks to Flit's guidance and encouragement from Seric Abis.
Seric Abis (セリック・アビス, Serikku Abisu)
Voiced by: Eiji Takemoto (Japanese); David Lee Mckinney (English)
A mobile suit and leader of the Abis Squad reassigned to Diva upon the Vagan invasion on Earth. During the final battle, he kills the leader of the Phantom 3, then his Clanche custom got crash into one of the Vagan battleships, cannot eject himself and Natora Einus becomes forced to fire Diva's Photon Blaster immediately at the enemy ship. However, Seric dies with no regrets after telling Natora how a fine captain she had become.
Wendy Hertz (ウェンディ・ハーツ, Wendi Hātsu)
Voiced by: Mariya Ise (Japanese); Alice Beaver (English)
Kio's close friend and a medicine student assigned to Diva's medical center for training under Yunoa.
Woottbit Gunhale (ウットビット・ガンヘイル, Uttobitto Ganheiru)
Voiced by: Shintaro Ohata (Japanese); David Lee Mckinney (English)
Arisa's son and Dique's grandson. He works on the Diva's mechanic team under Rody and respects him a lot. Upon meeting Kio, he got on bad terms with him thinking he just gets special treatment for being a member of the Asuno Family, but he eventually warms up to him and becomes his friend.
Shanalua Mallen (シャナルア・マレン, Shanarua Maren)
Voiced by: Romi Park
A member of Diva's mobile suit squad who becomes a close friend of Kio, who views her as an older sister. Shanalua's only relative is her younger sister whose poor health makes her dependant of regular treatment to survive. Unable to pay for the medical costs of her sister, Shanalua accepts the Vagans' offer to become a spy for them. When her treason is discovered, she escapes but is stopped by Kio, who refuses to believe in her guilt. In the end, Shanalua dies protecting Kio from a Vagan attack.

=== Madorna Workshop ===
Mukured Madorna (ムクレド・マッドーナ, Mukuredo Maddōna)
Voiced by: Hiroshi Shirokuma
Mukured is called by several of his known associates as a "mobile suit nut". He is highly passionate about his work on mobile suits and with the exception of his wife seems to love nothing more than to study a mobile suit and upgrade it. His skill as an engineer is something he takes great pride in.
Despite his mobile suit mania Mukured does have a sense of integrity. When he was introduced with an unusual mobile suit like nothing he had ever seen before he investigated it, and when he learned of its connection to the Vagan, he refused to work on it and intended to hand it over to the Federation.
Lalaparly Madorna (ララパーリー・マッドーナ, Rarapārī Maddōna)
Voiced by: Miki Nagasawa
Mukured's wife and Rody's mother who takes over the workshop after her husband's death.
Rody Madorna (ロディ・マッドーナ, Rodi Maddōna)
Voiced by: Masakazu Morita
Mukured and Lalaparly's son who later replaces Dique as Diva's chief mechanic responsible for the Age System. He joins the Diva against the will of his mother, who wants him to inherit the workshop instead.

=== Treasure Star ===
Daiki Ryuuzaki (ダイキ・リュウザキ, Daiki ryuuzaki)
The main character of Treasure Star, Daiki is a member of the space caravan group "Treasure Star" who yearns for adventure in outer space. Daiki is a happy-go-lucky character and somewhat very friendly to his friends and the people he meets. He also shares a bit of serious side when his father is involved, after he goes missing 6 years ago. He is usually not good on studying but also very robust when it come to fighting the Vagan. Usually him and Flit have different beliefs on the Vagan. He pilots the AGE-1 Gundam AGE-1 Daiki Version left behind by his father to fend off the invading Vagan army in the colony he lives in. He is shown to have exceptional X-Rounder abilities.
Ryuji Ryuuzaki (リュウジ・リュウザキ, Ryuuzaki Ryuuji)
A Federation mobile suit pilot from the future, who developed the AGE-1 Normal Daiki Version from the data of his wrecked RGE-G1100 Adele. Six years prior, he went missing during a battle with the invading Vagan fleet, leaving behind the said mobile suit. It's revealed that he is from the Third Generation and got thrown to the past before the start of the manga. He built replicas of the AGE Device, AGE Builder and the Gundam from his memory to combat the Vagan, which were passed down to Daiki. His relation to the Asuno family in the future is unknown.
Sirius (シリウス, Shiriusu)
Sirius is the leader of the space caravan "Treasure Star" and the captain of the ship of the same name, sharing in the adventures with Daiki. He has a love for curry.
Kotetsu Sakai (コテツ・サカイ, Kotetsu Sakai)
Member of the Treasure Star, who pilots a full armed Genoace. A friend of Sirius who has his eye on becoming the best chef in outer space.
Lhuga (ルーガ, Ruuga)
Member of the Treasure Star and a remarkable mobile suit pilot. Sometimes a bit wild, she dominates the battlefield using the WMS-GEX1C G-Exes Custom.

=== Bisidian ===
Wivik Lambro (ウィービック・ランブロ, Uībikku Ranburo)
Wivik Lambro is the son of Bisidian's leader and a remarkable mobile suit pilot, who pilots the G-Xiphos. He is ordered to retrieve the treasure Bisidian has been looking for, but when he and his crew infiltrates a certain asteroid in pursuit, he encounters the federation veteran Largan Drace and his platoon.
Captain Angrazzo (キャプテン・アングラッゾ, Kyaputen Angurazzo)
The leader of Bisidian, Captain Angrazzo is a former member of the Earth Federation's special forces and Wivik's father. He was caught on to the Federation's injustices and in order to oppose them.

=== Other characters ===
Yurin L'Ciel (ユリン・ルシェル, Yurin Rusheru)
Voiced by: Saori Hayami
Resident of the Nora space colony. She is rescued by Flit during the UE attack on the colony. She seems to possess mysterious psychic abilities (precognition) that helped Flit with his fight during the UE's attack on Nora. This is because she is an "X-Rounder", just like Flit. Later seen to be allied with the UE but only seen in combat under duress. After developing a strong attraction to Flit she was captured by Desil and was forced into the Farsia to act as a relay allowing him to control it remotely. After Flit's battle with Decil leaves him defeated she manages to gain control of her suit in time to stand between them, just to receive a fatal blow from Decil, before perishing in the subsequent explosion.
Hendrick Bruzar (ヘンドリック・ブルーザー, Hendorikku Buruuzaa)
Voiced by: Ikuya Sawaki
The Commander of the Earth Federal Forces in the Nora space colony, and Flit's foster father. He sacrificed himself by colliding a mobile work suit filled with explosives into a colony pillar that was blocking the space colony's core.
Frederick Algreus (フレデリック・アルグレアス, Furederikku Arugureasu)
Voiced by: Takehito Koyasu
Flit's aide during his time as commander of the Big-Ring orbital fortress. Eventually assumes Flit's position as commander-in-chief of the Federation Forces after his retirement. However, he still relies a little bit on Flit and he gave him commander of the fleet in the final battle instead of handling it himself.
Haro (ハロ, Haro)
Voiced by: Aya Endo
Haro is a special computer robot unit developed by Flit during his stay at Nora. Just like the Gundam, Haro is entrusted to Asemu by his father to aid in his travels, and inherited by Kio after Asemu's disappearance.
Don Boyage (ドン・ボヤージ, Don Boyaaji)
Voiced by: Kenta Miyake
He is the leader of the Zalam forces located in Fardain. After one of his subordinates begs for mercy from an UE mobile suit and is killed despite not being able to fight, he approaches the assailant and is easily defeated. He dies ramming his dismembered Gala into the Fa Bose, but no damage was inflicted.
Ract Elfamel (ラクト・エルファメル, Rakuto Erufameru)
Voiced by: Junichi Suwabe
Ract Elfamel was the leader of the Euba faction in the colony Fardain. During a skirmish in a Zalam territory, both feuding factions were stopped by Flit who attempted to convince them that they should stop fighting. At the same time, the UE attacks both sides. Ract and Don Boyage have focused on defeating the Gafrans that appeared before them and eventually formed an alliance against the UE.
Ract led the Euba forces in defending Fardain from further attacks by the UE. As Don Boyage was charging into the UE mothership, he was given the command over the Zalam faction. With the Zalam leader's death, he has announced that the Zalam-Euba Alliance will be pemernant after the funeral service for Don Boyage.
Alzack Birmings (アルザック・バーミングス, Aruzakku Baamingusu)
Voiced by: Tomomichi Nishimura
Yurin's foster father who lived in his mansion in colony minsry. He helped Grodek and his crew in planning the operation of 'War of Bat Extermination'. Soon, when Desil came to take Yurin away, he instantly surrendered her to him as he felt he did not need her anymore.

== UE/Vagan ==
Fezarl Ezelcant (フェザール・イゼルカント, Fezāru Izerukanto)
Voiced by: Ryūzaburō Ōtomo (Japanese); Seth Leslie (English)
Fezarl Ezelcant is the supreme commander of the Vagans and the responsible for the idealization of "Project EDEN", who the Vagans believe to be the conquest of Earth to establish a safe haven for them on it. Zeheart usually questions his methods which involve delayed attacks on the Federation Forces, leaving them with time to regroup and establish a course of action instead of quick strikes giving no chance of fighting back, wondering if he is actually testing his enemies' will and resolve. His assumptions are proven true when Ezelcant confesses it to Kio, and that his true objective is to create a new society composed only of Earthlings and Vagans whom he deems worthy of creating a peaceful future with all the rest vanquished by the war. Upon learning that he has only 6 months left to live, he joins his troops in battle piloting the newly built Gundam Legilis to ensure the completion of Project EDEN before his death.
Although he possesses X-Rounder abilities, he does not consider them a form of evolution but a regression of mankind to its more primal instincts and behavior instead. It was him who recovered a portion of the EXA-DB ancient military data 80 years ago during his investigation on the Earth Federation forces, allowing the Vagans to develop weapons far more advanced than those of the Earth Federation. Ezelcant had a son who died due to the "Mars Rays" disease that plagues his people who shares a striking resemblance to Kio, whose last words to him were his desire to be reborn on Earth. Thus the reason for him to put Kio under his guard instead of treating him like a prisoner during his confinement in Vagan, as he wanted to believe that somehow his son's dying wish was granted. At the limit of his forces, he nominates Zeheart as his rightful successor, entrusting him with Project EDEN and the Gundam Legilis. Soon after the Battle of La Gramis ends, Ezelcant thanks Kio for helping unite the Federation and Vagans together and entrusts the future to him at his deathbed, before antibiotics to cure Mars Rays.
Desil Galette (デシル・ガレット, Deshiru Garetto)
Voiced by: Ayahi Takagaki (child), Takuma Terashima (adult) (Japanese); Gloria Ansell (child), Michael Pizzuto (adult) (English)
Desil Galette is a mysterious boy that Flit met in Fardain, almost runs him over with a scooter. Desil had a small injury that Flit offered to take care of back on the Diva. At the time this event seemed to be a coincidence, however events indicate that Desil set everything up so he could get the opportunity to observe Flit and the Gundam. When he first meets Flit, he seems like a typical cheerful and innocent young boy with a playful streak, revealing his cruel nature after stealing the Gundam for a ride on it. He also appears more mature, far more mature than a young boy should be. Its later revealed to be one of the Vagans. As an X-Rounder, Desil possesses enhanced senses similar to Flit and Yurin, which he uses effectively when he piloted the AGE-1 Gundam, surprising both Flit and Woolf. Despite his young age he is shown to be a very capable pilot to the point where he can even pull difficult stunts while fighting the Vagan mobile suit types when he hijacked the Gundam from Flit.
Trying to make use of Yurin's X-Rounder's powers to take down the Gundam, Desil forces her into the Farsia to have her act as a relay allowing him to control it remotely. This plan backfires when Yurin sacrifices herself to protect Flit who brings his anger to defeat him, although he spared his life, leaving him stranded in space. He was then rescued by his companions and just like his brother Zeheart, he was put into cold sleep to preserve his body for the next stage of Ezelcant's project EDEN.
After waking up from cold sleep, Desil is angered to know that he has outranked by his younger brother. During the failed siege of the Big Ring fortress, Desil has another clash with Flit, and had not forgetting his defeat 25 years before, he throws all reason away when fighting him, determined to enact his revenge. He is killed by Asemu Asuno when he disable his mobile suit before destroying it during the battle of Nortram.
Zeheart Galette (ゼハート・ガレット, Zehāto Garetto)
Voiced by: Mamiko Noto (child), Hiroshi Kamiya (adult) (Japanese); Richard Magarey (English)
Zeheart Galette is a Vagan elite pilot and Desil's younger brother, with X-Rounder abilities tasked with the invasion of the Tordia colony where the Asuno family lives. After the Gundam was confirmed to being hidden in Tordia, Zeheart was assigned a mission to infiltrate the Tordia Academy to learn about the Gundam's whereabouts and secure it, joining member of the Mobile Suit Club and becoming close friends with Asemu and Romary. However the plan fails and much to his dismay, he finds that the current Gundam pilot is no other than Asemu himself. He stays at the academy until the graduation day when his cover is exposed by the Earth military and both Asemu and Romary see him emerging from his Zedas R, much to their horror.
After returning to his homeland, Zeheart is promoted to commander of the Vagan Frontline forces, much to his older brother's anger. Sharing Ezelcant's view of creating a peaceful future for his race on Earth, Zeheart is determined to make Project EDEN a success by any means necessary, not hesitating to abandon his brother to his death when he proved himself a hindrance. He remained attached to his friendship with Asemu, failing to kill him on several occasions when he had the chance and working with him to prevent a Vegan fortress falling to Earth during the battle of Nortram. Zeheart is put in cold sleep once more, returning decades later and leading the Vagan invasion of Earth. After the fall of the Lunar Base, Ezelcant makes him his successor, entrusting to him Project EDEN and Gundam Legilis.
As the new leader, he led all of vagan forces in the final battle but became increasingly deranged as his own ideals conflicted with his devotion to Exalcant's cause. In the final battle, he even sacrificed his most loyal supporter and love interest Fram Nara to lure the Gundams into the firing range of the digamozeon cannon, with the intention of wiping them out along with the Diva and many of his own forces. After firing the digamozeon cannon and killing Fram, he was shocked to see the Gundam trio surviving after Obright's sacrifice and Asemu's rescue. At this point he appears to break down completely, having a vision of all those who sacrificed their lives for Project Eden laughing at him. He sorties in Legilis despite being emotionally unstable and is almost immediately disabled by Asemu in the far less powerful Dark Hound. Rejecting Asemu's attempt at rescue he seems to find peace, reminiscing upon his happy days with Asemu and Romary at high school before Legilis explodes.
Gerra Zoi (ギーラ・ゾイ, Giira Zoi)
Voiced by: Chō
Gerra Zoi also going by the alias Yark Dole (ヤーク・ドレ, Yaaku Dore) is member of Vagan and the leader in the Ambat fortress. Killed by Grodek in revenge for his responsibility on the destruction of the Angel Colony during "The day the Angel Fell".
Arabel Zoi (アラベル・ゾイ, Araberu Zoi)
Voiced by: Mana Hirata (child), Kappei Yamaguchi (adult)
Son of Gerra Zoi. Witnessed his father being killed by Grodek and enacted his revenge by killing him soon after he was released from jail. However, he was disposed of by Vagan agents to erase any traces leading to them.
Fram Nara (フラム・ナラ, Furamu Nara)
Voiced by: Minako Kotobuki
A female officer and high level X-rounder assigned by Zanald Beyhart to work under Zeheart. Her true intentions were initially to spy on Zeheart and confirm if he is faltering on his mission as a commander of the Vagan Army. Later it was revealed she was the sister of Dole Frost, who perished protecting Zeheart during atmospheric entry. She warms up towards Zeheart upon learning of his true character and becomes devoted to his cause, eventually appearing to develop romantic feelings for him. Despite her naivety in battle, her X-rounder powers allowed her to pilot the Fawn Farsia with great aptitude, facing all three Asuno Gundams on a number of occasions and surviving. In the final battle Zeheart, in his deranged state, sent her to lure the Gundams into the digamozeon cannon blast despite knowing it to be a suicide mission. After attacking the Gundams, she was attacked by the remaining members of the Abis team, killing Jonathan before Obright severely damaged her suit. Before his death, Obright stabbed a beam sabre into her cockpit, mortally wounding her. After a final vision of Zeheart where he apologised and acknowledged her feelings she was vaporised by the digamozeon cannon along with the Diva and a large portion of both Vegan and EF forces.
Zanald Beihart (ザナルド・ベイハート, Zanarudo Beihāto)
Voiced by: Hisao Egawa
A high commander of the Vagan forces that just like Zeheart, responds directly to Ezelcant. Suspicious of Zeheart's worth and resolve to lead the Vagan Army, he sends Fram Nara to spy on him. However, despite Zeheart's new leadership position, he still has a suspicion of his leading skills by stopping the fight between Zeheart and kio, making it as if it was his. After disposing Deen Anon, he told Kio that if the ally MS is in no condition to fight, it is immediately dispose, then Kio use the FX Burst mode to finish Zanald, but his Xamdrag's parts cut off and forcing him to retreat because didn't expect that kind of power almost got him killed. He was then later killed when he and his ship was in the digamozeon cannon firing range, killing him.
Girard Spriggan (ジラード・スプリガン, Jirādo Supurigan)
Voiced by: Ryōka Yuzuki
Originally named Reina Spriggan, she was an X-Rounder mobile suit test pilot under the Federation Forces, along her lover Girard. After a disastrous test of a new device to enhance their X-Rounder powers, Girard is killed and Reina soon learns that his death was provoked by the Federation Scientists misconduct of the test. Upon trying to bring the matter to her superiors, she is ordered to keep silent about it. Fueled by revenge against the Federation, Reina accepts the Vagans' offer to join their side, adopting Girard's name and helping them to capture the Lunar Base. When her X-Rounder abilities gone berserk, she kills anyone who stands in her way, forcing Flit Asuno to kill her in his Gundam AGE-1 Gransa by shooting her cockpit.
Lu Anon (ルウ・アノン, Ruu Anon)
Voiced by: Kanae Itō
A young girl whom Kio befriends during his time as a Vagan prisoner. She is terminally ill due to the "Mars Rays" disease and becomes very happy upon meeting him, asking him to continue seeing her despite her brother's protests. Eager to help her, Kio agrees to cooperate with the Vagan effort to perform reverse engineering on his Gundam in exchange for medicine to ease her symptoms. She spends her remaining days happily besides him, and Kio learns of her death when he makes a stop during his escape to bid farewell to her, much to his grief.
Deen Anon (ディーン・アノン, Diin Anon)
Voiced by: Tetsuya Kakihara
Lu's elder brother who befriends Kio and invites him to his house. Knowing of her sister's feelings for Kio, he asks him to not meet her anymore fearing it would worsen even more her condition, but he eventually becomes grateful for him to providing medicine for Lu and keeping her company during her final moments. Soon after he joins the Vagan military after discovering that Kio is a Gundam pilot under the Earth Forces. He was involved in the final battle, piloting the jilsbain to fight Kio in his Gundam AGE-FX. When he encounter Kio, he uses the Mu-szell helmet, the fight is fierce, however, he is outmatched by Kio, but Deen's wish to have the grave of his sister, Lu, to be place in the Earth's soil in order to be happy for herself, but it's not long when he is brutally killed by Zanald Beihart and his Xamdrag, destroying the Jilsbain. Because of this, it enraged Kio to activate the FX Burst mode to finish just Zanald's Xamdrag off.
Leil Light (レイル・ライト, Reiru Raito)
Voiced by: Takashi Ōhara
An officer under Zeheart's team. He was way different from Fram, he ensures that he impresses Zeheart by doing all his tasks properly, like planting plasma bombs in Roustroulam while piloting a Wrozzo. He was the one who was assigned to search the EXA-DB, making him report to Zeheart about the appearance of CID. Unlike Fram, he always believes in Zeheart, instead of heading out to aid him whenever he is in trouble. After Zeheart received the gundam legilis, Zeheart's predecessor mobile suit, the ghirarga, which was damaged heavily at the lunar base, was repaired and repainted into a yellow-green colour and was entrusted to him. He was seen piloting the ghirarga in the final battle. He died when Obright Lorain sliced him and the ghirarga in half.
Zera Gins (ゼラ・ギンス, Zera Ginsu)
Voiced by: Daisuke Namikawa
A modified clone of Fezarl Ezelcant conceived to be the ultimate mobile suit pilot with X-Rounder abilities second to none. Originally designed as Ezelcant's successor until he chooses Zehart to replace him instead, Zera pilots the Vagan Gear in a last effort to stop the Gundams.

=== Magicians 8 ===
A Vagan elite corps composed of eight X-Rounders each piloting a Zedas M Mobile suit.
Dole Frost (ドール・フロスト, Dooru Furosuto)
Voiced by: Kenjiro Tsuda
The commander, died protecting Zeheart's Zeydra from disintegrating during an emergency fall on the Earth's atmosphere
Mink Leiden (ミンク・レイデン, Minku Reiden)
Voiced by: Mamiko Noto
second in command, killed by Diva's main weapon

The other six members were shot down by Asemu and Woolf:

- Gren Raize (グリン・ライズ, Gurin Raizu)
- Ressy Adnell (レッシー・アドネル, Resshii Adoneru)
- Leo Louis (レオ・ルイス, Reo Ruisu)
- Ned Kahn (ネッド・カーン, Neddo Kaan)
- Zafar Rogue (ザファー・ローグ, Zafaa Roogu)
- Zel Brant (ゼル・ブラント, Zeru Buranto)
