= List of Mobile Suit Gundam Unicorn characters =

This is a list of fictional characters from the Japanese novel series Mobile Suit Gundam Unicorn by Harutoshi Fukui and set during the Universal Century timeline.

== Main characters ==
Banagher Links (バナージ・リンクス, Banāji Rinkusu)
Voiced by: Kōki Uchiyama (Japanese); Steve Cannon (English)
The main protagonist and a student at Anaheim Industry Technical School in the colony Industrial 7. He is described as seeing war as something akin to fiction, as he was born after the One Year War ended and did not experience the subsequent conflicts. He is a part-time Petite MS pilot clearing space debris. However, upon meeting Audrey, he is drawn into a new conflict, especially when Vist Foundation leader Cardeas Vist (his father) entrusts him with the Unicorn Gundam before he dies in the first episode.
Audrey Burne (オードリー・バーン, Ōdorī Bān)
Voiced by: Ayumi Fujimura (Japanese); Stephanie Sheh (English)
A teenager from a noble family who came to Industrial 7 to convince the Vist Foundation not to turn over Laplace's Box to the Sleeves. Riddhe Marcenas mistakes her for a popular actress on Earth, but it is later discovered that she is Mineva Lao Zabi, the last surviving member of the Zabi family and heir to the Principality of Zeon. Her pseudonym appears to be derived from famed actress Audrey Hepburn.
Full Frontal (フル・フロンタル, Furu Furontaru)
Voiced by: Shuichi Ikeda (Japanese); Keith Silverstein (English)
The main antagonist and the mysterious leader of the Neo Zeon remnant forces who is described as the "second coming of Char". Like Char Aznable, he is a blond-haired man whose face is hidden behind a mask, wears a red uniform, and pilots a red mobile suit, the MSN-06S Sinanju. Late in the series, he pilots the leg-less NZ-999 Neo Zeong, which is a reference to the MSN-02 Zeong, which Char piloted during the final battle in the original series. Similar to Char, he holds the Neo Zeon remnants together with his high charisma. Whether the name is an alias is unspecified. He plays around Banagher and the others with his puzzling speech and behavior. He is fighting against the Earth Federation for "the secret" of the foundation of the Universal Century.
His face and tone closely resemble Char's. Nahel Argama captain Otto Midas remarked that his voice is just like Char's in archival footage. When Frontal removes his mask, Banagher instantly recognizes him to look exactly like Char (albeit with a large scar), prompting him to ask whether or not Frontal really is Char. He is later revealed to be a cyber Newtype who was genetically altered to resemble the missing-in-action Zeon heir. His memories and emotional patterns were then implanted from the psycho frame of one of the Mobile suits previously piloted by Char (Sazabi), although a recent Newtype interview with Kosugi Naohiro indicates that this may not be the origin for Full Frontal as depicted in the OVA.

== Others ==
=== Civilian ===
Takuya Irei (タクヤ・イレイ)
Voiced by: Hiro Shimono (Japanese); Robby Sharpe (English)
Banagher's roommate while studying at the Anaheim Industry Technical School. He wishes to become a test pilot for Anaheim Electronics and he knows a lot about mobile suits.
Micott Bartsch (ミコット・バーチ, Mikotto Bāchi)
Voiced by: Haruka Tomatsu (Japanese); Rachael Lillis (English)
A girl who commutes to a high school near the Anaheim Industry Technical School. Her father is the plant manager of Industrial 7. Micott is depicted in the OVA series as a student of the school.
Syam Vist (サイアム・ビスト, Saiamu Bisuto)
Voiced by: Ichiro Nagai (Japanese); Troy Baker in episodes 1-4 and George C. Cole in episode 7 (English)
A man who joined a group of terrorists in destroying the Laplace colony at the start of the series in UC 0001. He found and kept a strange object called the Laplace's Box after the explosion. He later married into the Vist family and became the head of the Vist Foundation. Cryonics technology allowed him to live as late as UC 0096.
Cardeas Vist (カーディアス・ビスト, Kādiasu Bisuto)
Voiced by: Takayuki Sugo (Japanese); Stephen Mendel (English)
The grandchild of Syam Vist, second generation head of the Vist family. He appears in the first episode "Day of the Unicorn," where he directs the testing of the Unicorn Gundam. He also negotiates to turn over Laplace's Box to the Sleeves. He dies after giving Banagher Links (his son) the Unicorn Gundam, the key to the mysterious object known as the Laplace Box.
Alberto Vist (アルベルト・ビスト, Aruberuto Bisuto)
Voiced by: Wataru Takagi (Japanese); JB Blanc (English)
Cardeas Vist's legitimate son and an Anaheim Electronics executive who boards the Nahel Argama to stop the opening of Laplace's Box. Despite showing a likeness to the Unicorn Gundam, most of, if not all, of the Nahel Argama crew are disgusted with his whining. He fatally wounds his father in the first episode.
Martha Vist Carbine (マーサ・ビスト・カーバイン, Māsa Bisuto Kābain)
Voiced by: Tomoko Shiota (Japanese); Ellyn Stern (English)
Cardeas' younger sister. She married into the Carbine family, which founded Anaheim Electronics. Her marriage allowed her to exercise much influence with the Earth Federation. At the start of the series, she opposes her father and brother's treatment of Laplace's Box, which plays a role in the Sleeves' attack of Industrial 7.
Gael Chan (ガエル・チャン, Gaeru Chan)
Voiced by: Yutaka Aoyama (Japanese); Taylor Henry (English)
A former Earth Federation soldier who works as Cardeas Vist's bodyguard and secretary.
Aaron Terzieff (アーロン・テルジェフ, Āron Terujefu)
Voiced by: Etsuo Yokobori (Japanese); Taliesin Jaffe (English)
An engineer at Anaheim Electronics who participated in the RX-0 development project as part of the armor materials division.

=== Neo Zeon ===
Suberoa Zinnerman (スベロア・ジンネマン, Suberoa Jinneman)
Voiced by: Hideaki Tezuka (Japanese); Michael Alston Bailey (English)
Captain of the Garancieres, the Sleeves' main ship which is disguised as a freighter. Over the course of the series, it is revealed that Zinnerman once had a wife and daughter who died in a massacre by Federation troops and has taken it upon himself to look after Marida Cruz.
Marida Cruz (マリーダ・クルス, Marīda Kurusu)
Voiced by: Yuko Kaida (Japanese); Tara Platt (English)
A female pilot of the mobile suit Kshatriya and later the Unicorn "Banshee". She refers to captain Suberoa as "Master" and loyally carries out his orders. One of the many clones of Gundam ZZ character Elpeo Ple, codenamed "Ple 12," Marida was awakened by Glemy Toto and fought with her sisters during the first Neo Zeon War. She survived the war, but was found and later sold into sex slavery. She suffered numerous pregnancies and abortions before Suberoa took her under his wing. During an examination on board the Nahel Argama when she is captured, it is ascertained that she cannot bear children anymore. Marida is one of only two surviving Ple clones, the other being featured in Gundam Evolve 10.
Angelo Sauper (アンジェロ・ザウパー, Anjero Zaupā)
Voiced by: Tetsuya Kakihara (Japanese); Michael Sinterniklaas (English)
A mobile suit pilot of the Sleeves. A loyal admirer of Full Frontal, Angelo is the commander of the Sleeves' Elite Guards unit and pilots two purple mobile suits over the course of the series - a customized Geara Zulu and a derivative called the Rozen Zulu.
Flaste Schole (フラスト・スコール, Furasuto Sukōru)
Voiced by: Rikiya Koyama (Japanese); Sean Schemmel in episodes 1-3 and Patrick Seitz in episode 4-7 (English)
The second in command of the Garencieres, as well as one of Zinnerman's old friends.
Gilboa Sant (ギルボア・サント, Giruboa Santo)
Voiced by: Chō (Japanese); Kirk Thornton (English)
A member of the Garencieres crew. He is a friendly man and a father to three children. He would die in the OVA episode and novel "The Ghost of Laplace."
Hill Dawson (ヒル・ドーソン, Hiru Dōson)
Voiced by: Hideyuki Umezu (Japanese); Liam O'Brien (English)
The captain of a Rewloola-class battleship that is also the Sleeves' flagship.

=== Earth Federation ===
Riddhe Marcenas (リディ・マーセナス, Ridi Māsenasu)
Voiced by: Daisuke Namikawa (Japanese); Yuri Lowenthal (English)
An Earth Federation mobile suit pilot assigned to the Londo Bell. Coming from a political family, Riddhe decided to join the military to make a name for himself. At the start of the series, Riddhe pilots the RGZ-95 ReZEL but later moves up to the Delta Plus and the RX-0 Unicorn Gundam 02 Banshee Norn.
Ronan Marcenas (ローナン・マーセナス, Rōnan Māsenasu)
Voiced by: Shinji Ogawa (Japanese); Patrick Seitz in episode 4 and Dave B. Mitchell in episodes 6-7 (English)
Riddhe's father and a member of the Earth Federation Central Council.
Ricardo Marcenas (リカルド・マーセナス, Rikarudo Māsenasu)
Voiced by: Kinryū Arimoto (Japanese); Robert O'Gorman (English)
The Earth Federation's first prime minister, died in the Laplace terror incident at the start of the series, in UC 0001. He is also the ancestor of Ronan and Riddhe Marcenas.
Otto Mitas (オットー・ミタス, Ottō Mitasu)
Voiced by: Naoya Uchida (Japanese); Michael Sorich (English)
The captain of the Londo Bell ship Nahel Argama.
Daguza Mackle (ダグザ・マックール, Daguza Makkūru)
Voiced by: Hiroki Touchi (Japanese); Richard Epcar (English)
The commander of the ECOAS unit's 920th special forces team. He dies in the episode "The Ghost of Laplace." After giving parting advice to Banagher as they arrived at Laplace, he is later incinerated by Full Frontal's beam naginata.
Conroy Haagensen (コンロイ・ハーゲンセン, Konroi Hāgensen)
Voiced by: Kenta Miyake (Japanese); Marc Thompson (English)
The second-in-command of the ECOAS unit's 920th special forces team. He also acts as Daguza Mackle's right-hand man.
Liam Borrinea (レイアム・ボーリンネア, Reiamu Bōrinnea)
Voiced by: Misa Watanabe (Japanese); Cindy Robinson (English).
A female officer who serves as the second-in-command to the Nahel Argama.
Mihiro Oiwakken (ミヒロ・オイワッケン, Mihiro Oiwakken)
Voiced by: Megumi Toyoguchi (Japanese); Michelle Ruff (English)
The Nahel Argama communications officer.
Hasan (ハサン, Hasan)
Voiced by: Masaharu Satou (reprising his role originated in Zeta Gundam) (Japanese); Kirk Thornton (English)
The military physician on the ship Nahel Aragama and has been since the First Neo Zeon war, having previously served on board the Argama during that conflict and the Gryps war.
Bright Noa (ブライト・ノア, Buraito Noa)
Voiced by: Ken Narita (succeeding the late Hirotaka Suzuoki) (Japanese); Chris Smith (English)

Commander of the Earth Federation Forces' Londo Bell auxiliary unit. Despite his sterling service record dating back to the One Year War, the Federation leadership regards him as dangerous and he has been removed from full operations. He returns as the captain of the Londo Bell flagship Ra Cailum. He appears in the chapter "In the depths of a Gravity Well".
Meran (メラン, Meran)
Voiced by: Unshō Ishizuka (Japanese); Marc Diraison (English)
Bright Noa's executive officer aboard the Ra Cailum. Although he is older than Bright by the time of the series-at 40 years old- he maintains his loyalty to the captain.
Tri-Stars
An oblique reference to the Principality of Zeon's Black Tri-Star ace trio, the Tri-Stars are Federation pilots originally assigned to work on the UC Project. The project's cancellation results in them getting reassigned to the Londo Bell flagship Ra Cailum as pilots of the new RGM-96X Jesta mobile suit.
Nigel Garrett (ナイジェル・ギャレット, Naijeru Gyaretto)
Voiced by: Yuichi Nakamura (Japanese); Matthew Mercer (English)
The Tri-Stars' commander, Garrett is a lieutenant who is not afraid to criticize his superiors.
Daryl McGuinness (ダリル・マッギネス, Dariru Magginesu)
Voiced by: Anri Katsu (Japanese); Spike Spencer (English)
A dark-haired junior lieutenant, McGuinness is a kind man who is actually a dangerous foe on the battlefield.
Watts Stepney (ワッツ・ステップニー, Wattsu Suteppuni)
Voiced by: Hiroki Yasumoto (Japanese); Kyle Hebert (English)
Straightforward and honest, Stepney is also the Tri-Stars' hot-blooded pilot.

=== Zeon Remnant ===
Both characters appeared in the novel/OVA episode "In the Depths of a Gravity Well."

Yonem Kirks (ヨンム・カークス, Yonmu Kākusu)
Voiced by: Unshō Ishizuka (Japanese); Kyle Hebert (English)
the leader of a Zeon Remnant group based in New Guinea. He looks after Loni Garvey when his close friend, Loni's father Mahadi, dies years before the events of the series.
Loni Garvey (ロニ・ガーベイ, Roni Garbei)
Voiced by: Mariya Ise (Japanese); Karen Strassman (English)
A mobile suit pilot in Kirks' Zeon Remnant. She is the daughter of the wealthy Mahdi Garvey, a former Zeon soldier who brought the Remnants together and later died at the hands of the Federation. His death prompts Loni to avenge him as the pilot of the huge mobile armor Shamblo. In the OVA series, she is the only pilot of the Shamblo, while in the episode's novel version, she is one of the mobile armor's four crewmembers.
