= Rie Kugimiya =

Japanese voice actress and singer (born 1979)

- 釘宮 理恵
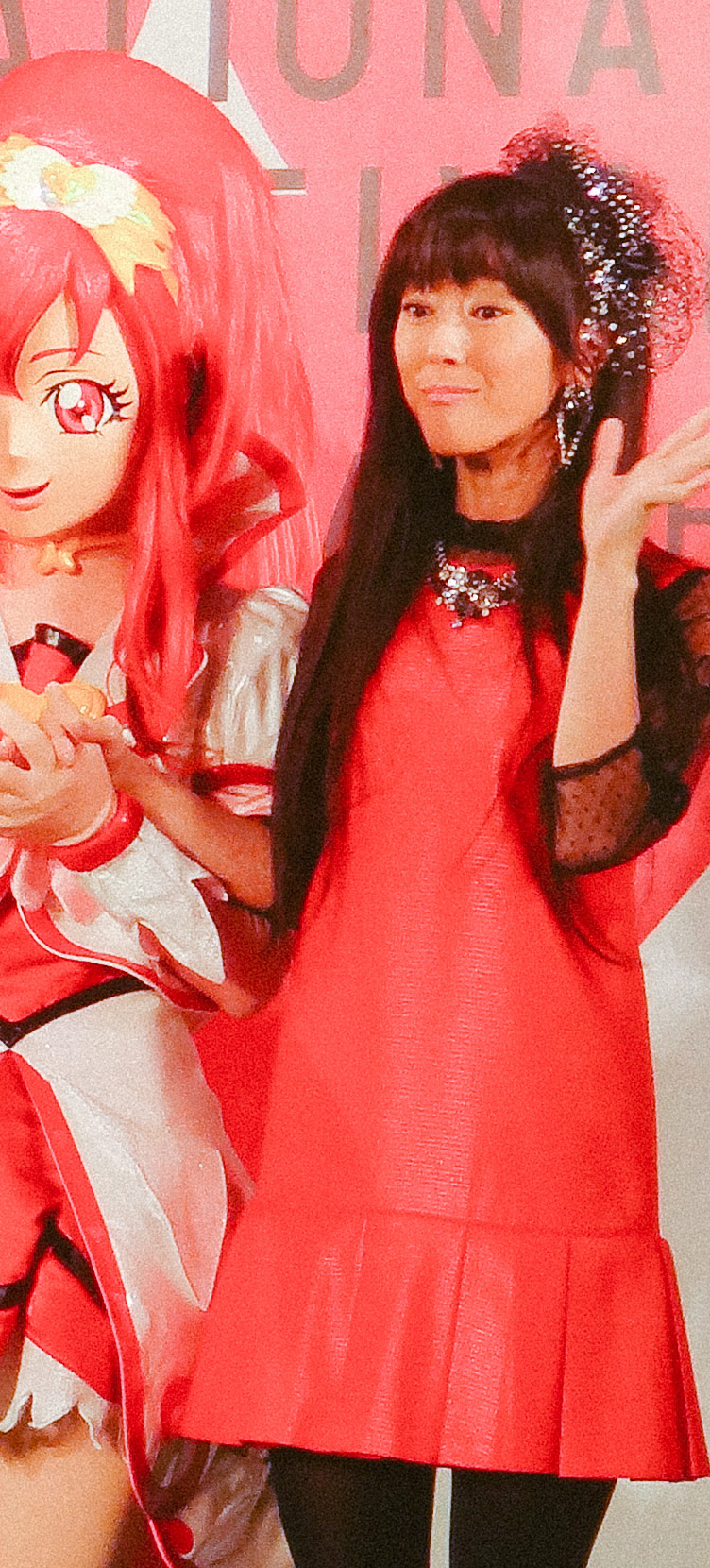
- Kugimiya at the 2013 Tokyo International Film Festival
- Born: May 30, 1979 (age 47); Osaka, Japan
- Occupations: Voice actress; singer
- Years active: 1998–present
- Agent: I'm Enterprise
- Notable work: Fullmetal Alchemist as Alphonse Elric; Shakugan no Shana as Shana; The Familiar of Zero as Louise; Yakuza series as Haruka Sawamura; Gintama as Kagura; Bleach as Nemu Kurotsuchi; Hayate the Combat Butler as Nagi Sanzenin; Fairy Tail as Happy; Toradora! as Taiga Aisaka; Honkai Impact 3rd as Kiana Kaslana; Cookie Run: Kingdom as Strawberry Cookie
- Height: 159 cm (5 ft 3 in)

Rie Kugimiya (釘宮 理恵, Kugimiya Rie; born May 30, 1979) is a Japanese voice actress and singer. She is best known for her voice performances in anime, which include Alphonse Elric in the Fullmetal Alchemist series, Kagura in Gintama, Nemu Kurotsuchi in Bleach, and Happy in Fairy Tail and Edens Zero, and in video games, such as Haruka Sawamura in the Yakuza series, Kiana Kaslana in Honkai Impact 3rd, and Rise Kujikawa from Persona 4. Because of her roles for characters such as Shana in Shakugan no Shana, Louise in The Familiar of Zero, Nagi Sanzenin in Hayate the Combat Butler, Taiga Aisaka in Toradora!, Aguri Madoka/Cure Ace in DokiDoki! PreCure, and Aria Holmes Kanzaki in Aria the Scarlet Ammo, some of her fans have nicknamed her the "Queen of Tsundere." She is currently represented by the talent agency I'm Enterprise.

She was nominated for Best Actress in a Leading Role at the 1st Seiyu Awards and for Best Actress in Supporting Role. She also won Best Actress in a Supporting Role with Mitsuki Saiga at the 2nd Seiyu Awards. Kugimiya won Best Actress in the 3rd Seiyu Awards for the roles as Taiga Aisaka in Toradora! and her work in Nabari no Ou.

== Career ==
In 1997, she earned her reputation from the company I'm Enterprise & We Flying Award at the first summer school of voice actors sponsored by Japan Narration Institute. Later, she became a member of I'm Enterprise.

In 1998, she debuted as a voice actress in the video game etude prologue -Shaking heart- as Tadami Saeki.

From the beginning of her debut, she plays the role of a teenage girl mainly from her childhood, using her voice quality. Later, she was appointed as a juvenile character, such as Taiki in Twelve Kingdoms and Alphonse Elric in Fullmetal Alchemist series. She took charge of various characters.

Kugimiya has also voiced several tsundere heroines, including Louise in The Familiar of Zero series, and Nagi Sanzenin in Hayate the Combat Butler. In 2008, she won for the Best Actresses in supporting roles at the 2nd Seiyu Awards. She won for the Best Actress in leading role at the 3rd Seiyu Awards. Within the Tamagotchi fandom she is known for her role in the Tamagotchi movies and anime as Mametchi. She has also contributed her voice to various merchandise such as Mugen Puchipuchi Moe, a virtual keychain bubble-wrap popping game.

She is also active on stage, and participates in several stages and readings.

== Filmography ==
=== Anime ===
List of voice performances in anime
Year	Title	Role	Notes	Source
	Crayon Shin-chan	Masami Tansawa 短澤まさみ		
1999	Kyorochan	Mentamaru-chan		
2000–02	Pilot Candidate	Ikhny Allecto	Also OVA	
2000	Mon Colle Knights	Beauty III ビューティ3世		
2000–06	Hamtaro	Ook-Ook, Tomy-T		
2000	Hand Maid May	Cyberdoll Rena		
2000	Shin Megami Tensei: Devil Children	Metchi メッチー		
2000	Inuyasha	Gohou		
2001	Super GALS! Kotobuki Ran	Sayo Kotoubki		
2001	Galaxy Angel	Chibita, Girl A		
2001	Shingu: Secret of the Stellar Wars	Futaba Murata		
2001	Chance Pop Session	Nao		
2001	Figure 17	Mina Sawada		
2001	Najica Blitz Tactics	Mizuhi Katsuura		
2001	Vandread: the second stage	Shirley		
2001	Vampiyan Kids	Moripyon モリピョン		
2002	Rizelmine	Rizel Iwaki		
2002–05	Wagamama Fairy: Mirumo de Pon! series	Murumo		
2002	Pita-Ten	Koboshi Uematsu		
2002	The Twelve Kingdoms	Taiki		
2002	G-on Riders	Lilo		
2002	Fortune Dogs	Himechin		
2002–04	Gravion	Brigetta	Also Zwei	
2003	Zatch Bell!	Tia		
2003	Astro Boy	Nyanko		
2003	Saint Beast ~Seijuu Kourin Hen~	Bambi no Mio		
2003–05	Guardian Hearts	Hina	OVA; Also Power Up! in 2005	
2003	Dokkoida?!	Ruri Umeki (Edelweiss) 梅木瑠璃（エーデルワイス）		
2003	Fullmetal Alchemist	Alphonse Elric, Catherine Elle Armstrong		
2003–04	Rockman.EXE Axess	Anetta	Starting with Axess	
2003	Full-Blast Science Adventure - So That's How It Is	Suzuka		
2004–09	Maria-sama ga Miteru series	Tōko Matsudaira		
2004	Burn-Up Scramble	Maya Jingu		
2004	Daphne in the Brilliant Blue	Takahashi, Kenta 高橋健太		
2004	Midori Days	Kouta Shingyoji		
2004	Kurau: Phantom Memory	Naoki		
2004	Ninja Nonsense	Miyabi		
2004	Ichigeki Sacchu!! HoiHoi-san	HoiHoi-san	OVA	
2004–05	Beet the Vandel Buster	Rion リオン		
2004–05	Magical Girl Lyrical Nanoha	Alisa Bannings		
2004-present	Bleach	Karin Kurosaki, Nemu Kurotsuchi		
2004	Yakitate!! Japan	Monica Adenauer		
2004	Gakuen Alice	Hotaru Imai		
2004	Major	Daisuke Komori	1st TV series	
2005–06	Otogi-Jūshi Akazukin series	Ringo Kinoshita	OVA and TV series	
2005–07	Bludgeoning Angel Dokuro-Chan series	Sabato-chan		
2005	MÄR	Belle		
2005	Elemental Gelade	Tickle "Tilele" Selvatlos		
2005	Best Student Council	Eliza Yamamoto		
2005	Loveless	Kouya Sakagami		
2005	Munto: Sora o Miageru Shōjo no Hitomi ni Utsuru Sekai	Suzume Imamura	OVA	
2005	Trinity Blood	Peter		
2005	Oku-sama wa Mahō Shōjo: Bewitched Agnes	Mika Shimizu		
2005	Jing, King of Bandits: Seventh Heaven	Pom クローブ	OVA	
2005	Canvas 2: Niji Iro no Sketch	Haruna Mochizuki		
2005–11	Shakugan no Shana series	Shana		
2005	Paradise Kiss	Yamamoto		
2006	Digimon Savers	Ikuto Noguchi		
2006–present	Utawarerumono series	Kamyu	Also 2009, 2015, and 2022 series	
2006–21	Gintama series	Kagura, Kouka		
2006	Glass Fleet	Ralph Fitzlard Deon de Lac		
2006	Honey and Clover	Shinobu Morita (young)	Series 2	
2006–12	The Familiar of Zero series	Louise		
2006	Chocotto Sister	Yurika Hanayamada		
2006	Tokimeki Memorial Only Love	Momo Aikawa		
2006	Lovely Idol	Shizuku Oji		
2006	Ghost Hunt	Masako Hara		
2006	Buso Renkin	Victoria Powered		
2006–10	Nodame Cantabile	Riona, Catherine		
2007	Deltora Quest	Nerida ネリダ		
2007–12	Hidamari Sketch	Chika		
2007–13	Hayate the Combat Butler series	Nagi Sanzenin		
2007	Heroic Age	Mail Al Mehelim		
2007	GeGeGe no Kitaro	Kana, Haruka 加奈/遥	5th TV series	
2007	Oh! Edo Rocket	Shunpei		
2007	Kishin Taisen Gigantic Formula	Ereonore Klein エレオノーレ・クライン		
2007	Bokurano	Shiuta Yamura		
2007	Emma: Victorian Romance Second Art	Yang ヤン		
2007	Potemayo	Nene Kasugano, Tomari Seki		
2007	Mokke	Takatsu 高津		
2007–08	Mobile Suit Gundam 00 series	Nena Trinity		
2007	Rental Magica	Mikan Katsuragi, Kaori Katsuragi		
2007	Let's Go! Tamagotchi	Mametchi		
2008	Rosario + Vampire series	Mizore Shirayuki		
2008	Mnemosyne	Mimi		
2008	Nabari no Ou	Miharu Rokujou		
2008	Zettai Karen Children	Momotarō, Mio, others		
2008	Our Home's Fox Deity	Tsukuyomi		
2008	Kyōran Kazoku Nikki	Mujaki Serpent		
2008	Toradora!	Taiga Aisaka		
2008	Akaneiro ni Somaru Saka	Yuuhi Katagiri		
2008	Linebarrels of Iron	Izuna Endo		
2008	Kemeko Deluxe!	Misaki Hayakawa		
2008	Hell Girl: Three Vessels	Shinohara Usagi		
2008	Shugo Chara! Doki	Yua Sakurai		
2008	Inazuma Eleven	Toramaru Utsunomiya		
2008	Earl and Fairy	Marigold		
2009–12	Queen's Blade series	Melona, Lana		
2009	Basquash!	Flora Skybloom		
2009–14	Saki	Yuki Kataoka		
2009	Fullmetal Alchemist: Brotherhood	Alphonse Elric, Catherine Elle Armstrong		
2009	Tenchi Muyo! War on Geminar	Lan ラン	OVA	
2009	Umineko no Naku Koro ni	Shannon		
2009	Kanamemo	Mika Kujiin		
2009–present	Hetalia: Axis Powers	Liechtenstein		
2009	Jungle Taitei – Yūki ga Mirai wo Kaeru	Here ココ		
2009	Tatakau Shisho: The Book of Bantorra	Akito Chroma アーキット=クロマ		
2009	Nogizaka Haruka no Himitsu:Purezza	Alistia Rein, Tōka Tennōji		
2009–present	Fairy Tail	Happy		
2009–15	Tamagotchi series	Mametchi		
2009	Welcome to Irabu's Office	Rena 麗奈		
2010	Ladies versus Butlers	Kaoru Daichi		
2010	Dance in the Vampire Bund	Hysterica		
2010	Jewel Pet Tinkle	Marianne マリアンヌ		
2010	Ōkami-san & her Seven Companions	Mimi Usami		
2010–11	Hyakka Ryōran Samurai Girls series	Sanada Yukimura		
2010	A Certain Magical Index II	Agnese Sanctis		
2011–13	Freezing series	Cathy Lockharte		
2011	Dragon Crisis!	Rose		
2011	Beyblade: Metal Fury	Motti モッティ		
2011–13	Yondemasuyo, Azazel-san series	Kiyoko		
2011–11	Astarotte no Omocha series	Astarotte "Lotte" Ygvar		
2011	Aria the Scarlet Ammo series	Aria H. Kanzaki	Also AA in 2015	
2011	Inazuma Eleven GO	Toramaru Utsunomiya		
2011	Kaitō Tenshi Twin Angel: Twinkle Paradise	Kurumi Hazuki	Also OVAs in 2013	
2011	The Idolmaster series	Iori Minase	Also Petit	
2011	Persona 4: The Animation	Rise Kujikawa	Also Golden in 2014	
2011	Bakuman.	Mikichi Ko耶 見吉香耶	Season 2	
2012	Kill Me Baby	Unused character		
2012–13	Recorder and Randsell series	Atsumi Miyagawa		
2012–14	Kenichi: The Mightiest Disciple OVAs	Miu Furinji	OVA, replacing Tomoko Kawakami	
2012	Arashi no Yoru ni: Himitsu no Tomodachi	Mei メイ		
2012	Sengoku Collection	Misawa-chan 三沢ちゃん		
2012	Shirokuma Cafe	High school girl		
2012–15	Nyaruko: Crawling with Love series	Hasuta		
2012	Shining Hearts: Shiawase no Pan	Melty		
2012–21	Kingdom series	Heliao Diao		
2012	Good Luck Girl!	Kurumi Minowa		
2012	Love, Election and Chocolate	Yuina Ōsawa		
2012	Battle Spirits: Sword Eyes	Haqua Estoc ハクア・エストック		
2012	Gokicha!! Cockroach Girls	Chaba	mobile phone anime	
2012	Kamisama Kiss	Hiroko		
2012	Busou Shinki	Tsugaru Santa Maria ツガル・サンタマリア		
2012	Robotics;Notes	Airi		
2012	Nogizaka Haruka no Himitsu: Finale	Alistia Rein, Tōka Tennōji	OVA ep 4	
2013	Zettai Karen Children: The Unlimited	Momotarō		
2013–14	One Piece	Sugar, Bian		
2013	DokiDoki! PreCure	Aguri Madoka / Cure Ace		
2013	DD Fist of the North Star	Tow トウ		
2013	Red Data Girl	Satoru Wamiya		
2013	Hyakka Ryōran Samurai Bride	Sanada Yukimura 真田幸村		
2013	Oreimo	Kanata Kurusu		
2013	WataMote	Ki-chan		
2013	Battle Spirits Saikyou Ginga Ultimate Zero	Restrictocin-April リクト・エイプリル		
2013	Kyōsōgiga	Koto		
2014	Witch Craft Works	Chronoire Schwarz VI		
2014–15	Noragami series	Nora	Also Arogoto	
2014	Puchimas! Petit Idolmaster	Iori Minase, Io		
2014	selector infected WIXOSS	Ulith	also selector spread WIXOSS	
2014	JoJo's Bizarre Adventure: Stardust Crusaders	Anne アン		
2014	The Comic Artist and His Assistants	Sena Kuroi		
2014	No Game No Life	Tet		
2014–19	Tokyo Ghoul series	Jūzō Suzuya		
2014–15	I Can't Understand What My Husband Is Saying series	Rino Juse		
2014	World Trigger	Kirie Konami		
2014	Trinity Seven	Sora		
2014	Gonna be the Twin-Tail!!	Strawberry Twin		
2014	Girl Friend Beta	Matsuri Kagami		
2015	Yurikuma Arashi	Milne		
2015	World Break: Aria of Curse for a Holy Swordsman	Arlene Highbury		
2015	Blood Blockade Battlefront	White and Black		
2015–17	Punch Line	Meika Daihatsu		
2015	Wooser's Hand-to-Mouth Life	Angela Balzac		
2015	Seiyu's Life!	Herself		
2015	Mr. Osomatsu	Shaolin (Ep. 22)		
2015	K: Return of Kings	Sukuna Gojou		
2016	Divine Gate	Shonen K		
2016	Love Live! Sunshine!!	Chika's Mother		
2016	Fate/kaleid liner Prisma Illya	Beatrice Flowerchild		
2016	Danganronpa 3: The End of Kibōgamine Gakuen	Daisaku Bandai	Mirai Hen series	
2016	Kyoukai no Rinne	Anju		
2016	Handa-kun	Kasumi Hirayama		
2016	Nyanbo!	Kotora		
2016	Ninja Girl & Samurai Master	Nene		
2016	Cheating Craft	Koi Oh		
2017	ēlDLIVE	Dolugh		
2017–19	Granblue Fantasy The Animation	Vyrn		
2017	Land of the Lustrous	Alexandrite		
2017	Schoolgirl Strikers: Animation Channel	Mosyne, Isari & Kagari Haishima		
2017	Kado: The Right Answer	Kanata Shinawa		
2017	Convenience Store Boy Friends	Mami Mihashi		
2017	Garo: Vanishing Line	Sophie Hennes		
2018	Cutie Honey Universe	Tarantula Panther		
2018	Darling in the Franxx	001		
2018	Umamusume: Pretty Derby	Sunvisor		
2018	Xuan Yuan Sword Luminary	Fu Ning		
2019	YU-NO: A Girl Who Chants Love at the Bound of this World	Mio Shimazu		
2019–21	Fruits Basket	Kagura Sōma		
2019	Fire Force	Haumea		
2019	Food Wars! Shokugeki no Soma: The Fourth Plate	Momo Akanegakubo		
2020	Magia Record: Puella Magi Madoka Magica Side Story	Touka Satomi		
2020	Drifting Dragons	Capella		
2020	Mewkledreamy	Yuni		
2020	Listeners	Nir		
2020	The God of High School	Sumi, Bora Ma		
2020	Digimon Adventure	Fanbeemon		
2020	The Misfit of Demon King Academy	Heine Kanon Iorg		
2020–present	Jujutsu Kaisen	Momo Nishimiya		
2021	Re:Zero	Pandora		
2021	Hortensia Saga	Saria/Elva		
2021	Godzilla Singular Point	Jung		
2021	Edens Zero	Happy		
2021–22	Shadows House	Barbie/Barbara		
2021	Kimi to Fit Boxing	Janice		
2021–present	Banished from the Hero's Party	Tisse Garland		
2022	The Genius Prince's Guide to Raising a Nation Out of Debt	Tolcheila		
2022	Life with an Ordinary Guy Who Reincarnated into a Total Fantasy Knockout	Goddess of Love and Beauty		
2022	The Case Study of Vanitas	Chloé d'Apchier		
2022	Kotaro Lives Alone	Kotaro Satо̄, Tonosan		
2022	Summer Time Rendering	Shiori Kobayakawa		
2022	Pokémon: Hisuian Snow	Young Alec		
2022	Yurei Deco	Smiley		
2022	Akiba Maid War	Omoe		
2023	Pole Princess!!	Azumi Shinō		
2023	The Magical Revolution of the Reincarnated Princess and the Genius Young Lady	Lumielle Rene Palettia		
2023	Otaku Elf	Yord		
2023	Demon Slayer: Kimetsu no Yaiba – Swordsmith Village Arc	Muichiro's Kasugai Crow		
2023	A Galaxy Next Door	Protagonist of "Master of the Lion's Fist"		
2023	Yohane the Parhelion: Sunshine in the Mirror	Chika's mother		
2023	Sacrificial Princess and the King of Beasts	Anubis (young)		
2023	Undead Unluck	Tatiana		
2024	The Foolish Angel Dances with the Devil	Liz		
2024	Delusional Monthly Magazine	Catherine Sue		
2024	Brave Bang Bravern!	Verum Vita		
2024	Astro Note	Ren Wakabayashi		
2024	Yatagarasu: The Raven Does Not Choose Its Master	Shiratama		
2024	Chillin' in Another World with Level 2 Super Cheat Powers	Fenrys		
2024	Red Cat Ramen	Hana		
2024	Cardfight!! Vanguard DivineZ	Sybilt	Season 2	
2024	Kagaku×Bōken Survival	Kyuri		
2024	Haigakura	Kaka		
2025	Zenshu	Unio		
2025	I'm a Noble on the Brink of Ruin, So I Might as Well Try Mastering Magic	Radon in human form		
2025	Mashin Creator Wataru	Ryun Ryun		
2025	Toilet-Bound Hanako-kun	Mirai	Season 2	
2025	Black Butler: Emerald Witch Arc	Sieglinde Sullivan		
2025	Witch Watch	Syrup		
2025	Mobile Suit Gundam GQuuuuuuX	Haro, Tamaki Yuzuriha		
2025	Bullet/Bullet	Qu-0213 Nosa-ane	ONA	
2026	Digimon Beatbreak	Honoka Sakai		
2026	Killed Again, Mr. Detective?	Shardina		
2026	Marika's Love Meter Malfunction	Niino Hidaka		
2026	Dandelion	Asako	ONA	
2026	Mao	Natsuno		
2026	Grow Up Show: Sunflower Circus	Maria		
2026	The 100 Girlfriends Who Really, Really, Really, Really, Really Love You	Yaku Yakuzen	Season 3	
2027	Gacha Girls Corps	Luna Varedas		
2027	The Eternal Fool's Words of Wisdom	Aileen		

=== Films ===
List of voice performances in films
Year	Title	Role	Notes	Source
2004	Zatch Bell!: 101st Devil	Tia		
2005	Fullmetal Alchemist: The Conqueror of Shamballa	Alphonse Elric		
2005	Zatch Bell! Movie 2: Attack of Mechavulcan	Tia		
2006	Bleach: Memories of Nobody	Karin Kurosaki		
2007	Shakugan no Shana: The Movie	Shana		
2007	Yes! PreCure 5 the Movie: Miraculous Adventure in the Mirror Kingdom!	Dark Lemonade		
2007	Tamagotchi: The Movie	Mametchi		
2007	Bleach: The DiamondDust Rebellion	Karin Kurosaki		
2008	Bleach: Fade to Black	Nemu Kurotsuchi 涅ネム		
2008	Major: Yūjō no Winning Shot	Daisuke Komori		
2008	Tamagotchi: Happiest Story in the Universe!	Mametchi		
2010	Mahou Shoujo Lyrical Nanoha the movie 1st	Alisa Bannings		
2010	Crayon Shin-chan: Super-Dimension! The Storm Called My Bride	Tamiko Kaneari		
2010	Gintama: The Movie	Kagura		
2010	Pokémon: Zoroark: Master of Illusions	Celebi		
2010	Mobile Suit Gundam 00 the Movie: A Wakening of the Trailblazer	Meena Carmine ミーナ・カーマイン		
2010	Bleach: Hell Verse	Karin Kurosaki		
2011	Fullmetal Alchemist: The Sacred Star of Milos	Alphonse Elric		
2011	Alice in the Country of Hearts:Wonderful Wonder World	Alice Liddell		
2011	Hayate the Combat Butler! Heaven Is a Place on Earth	Nagi Sanzenin		
2012	Mahou Shoujo Lyrical Nanoha THE MOVIE 2nd A's	Alisa Bannings		
2012	Fairy Tail the Movie: Phoenix Priestess	Happy		
2012	Blue Exorcist: The Movie	Usamaro		
2013	Gintama: The Movie: The Final Chapter: Be Forever Yorozuya	Kagura		
2013	Dokidoki! PreCure the Movie: Mana's Getting Married!!? The Dress of Hope Tied to the Future	Aguri Madoka / Cure Ace		
2014	The Idolmaster Movie: shine to the other side!	Iori Minase		
2014	Pretty Cure All Stars New Stage 3: Eternal Friends	Aguri Madoka / Cure Ace		
2014	Expelled from Paradise	Angela Balzac		
2015	Pretty Cure All Stars: Spring Carnival♪	Aguri Madoka / Cure Ace		
2015	Pokémon the Movie: Hoopa and the Clash of Ages	Hoopa		
2015	Arpeggio of Blue Steel -Ars Nova Cadenza-	Musashi		
2016	Selector Destructed WIXOSS	Rumi Igarashi / Ulith		
2016	Pretty Cure All Stars: Singing with Everyone♪ Miraculous Magic!	Aguri Madoka / Cure Ace		
2017	Fairy Tail Movie 2: Dragon Cry	Happy		
2017	Hirune Hime: Shiranai Watashi no Monogatari	Joy		
2017	No Game No Life: Zero	Tet		
2017	Fate/kaleid liner Prisma Illya: Vow in the Snow	Beatrice Flowerchild		
2017	Doraemon the Movie 2017: Great Adventure in the Antarctic Kachi Kochi	Clara		
2018	Batman Ninja	Harley Quinn		
2018	Penguin Highway	Uchida		
2019	Hello World	Karasu		
2019	Love Live! Sunshine!! The School Idol Movie: Over the Rainbow	Takami Mother		
2020	Doraemon: Nobita's New Dinosaur	Myu		
2021	Gintama The Final	Kagura		
2021	Fate/kaleid liner Prisma Illya: Licht - The Nameless Girl	Beatrice Flowerchild		
2021	Jujutsu Kaisen 0	Momo Nishimiya		
2023	Digimon Adventure 02: The Beginning	Ukkomon		
2023	Birth of Kitarō: The Mystery of GeGeGe			
2023	My Next Life as a Villainess: All Routes Lead to Doom! The Movie	Piyo		
2025	Batman Ninja vs. Yakuza League	Harley Quinn		
2026	Cosmic Princess Kaguya!	Fushi		
2026	Grotesqqque	Poyomi		

=== Drama CD ===
List of voice performances in drama CDs
Title	Role	Notes	Source
A Certain Magical Index	Agnese Sanctis		
Akaneiro ni Somaru Saka	Yuuhi Katagiri		
Cosplay Complex	Delmo		
Earl and Fairy	Marigold		
Ebiten: Kōritsu Ebisugawa Kōkō Tenmonbu	Yuka Iseda		
Fullmetal Alchemist	Alphonse Elric		
Hand Maid May	Cyberdoll Rena		
Hayate the Combat Butler	Nagi Sanzenin		
Nagasarete Airantou	Yukino		
Nekogami Yaoyorozu	Mayu		
Nogizaka Haruka no Himitsu	Alistia Rein, Tōka Tennōji		
Nyaruko: Crawling with Love	Hasuta		
Superior	Angelica		
Toradora!	Taiga Aisaka		

=== Video games ===
List of voice performances in video games
Year	Title	Role	Notes	Source
2002–06	Xenosaga series	Mary Godwin	PS2	
2003	The Key of Avalon	Coppelia コッペリア	Arcade	
2003	Summon Night 3	Alize アリーゼ	PS1/PS2	
2003	Ichigeki Sacchu!! HoiHoi-san	ID-3 Hoihoi-san	PS1/PS2	
2003	Growlanser Wayfarer of Time	Leona	PS1/PS2; Also Over Reloaded in 2011	
2003–05; 2009–10	Fullmetal Alchemist games	Alphonse Elric	PS1/PS2	
2004–05	Zatch Bell! games	Tia		
2004	Crimson Tears	Maple カエデ	PS1/PS2	
2004	Blue Tears	Kudo Moemi / Senna 工藤もえみ/セナ		
2004	Akai Ito	Tsudura Wakasugi 若杉葛	PS1/PS2	
2004–06	Riviera: The Promised Land	Ecthel		
2005	Lovely Idol	Shizuku Oji	PS1/PS2	
2005	Hanjuku Hero 4: 7-Jin no Hanjuku Hero	The Alchemist of Lethocerus deyrollei (Al) タガメの錬金術士（アル）	PS1/PS2	
2005	Elemental Gerad - Matoe, Midori-style sword -	Tickle "Tilele" Selvatlos	PS1/PS2	
2005–16	The Idolmaster games	Iori Minase		
2005	Samurai Shodown VI	Rimururu, Campur	Arcade	
2005–Present	Yakuza series	Haruka Sawamura		
2006	Shakugan no Shana games	Shana	PS1/PS2	
2006	Gakuen Alice ~ glitter ★ memory Kiss ~	Hotaru Imai	PS1/PS2	
2006	Rune Factory: A Fantasy Harvest Moon	Mei	DS	
2006–15	Utawarerumono games	Kamyu	PS1/PS2	
2006	Mainichi Issho	Tsundere Hyakunin ツンデレ百人一首	PS3	
2006	Chrome Shelled Regios	Ferri Ross フェリ・ロス	Webラジオ	
2006	Digimon World Data Squad	Ikuto イクト	PS1/PS2	
2006	Zegapain Not	Calm カーム		
2007–08	The Familiar of Zero games	Louise	PS1/PS2	
2007	Bincho-tan Shiawase-goyomi	Abemaki	PS1/PS2	
2007–09	Hayate the Combat Butler games	Nagi Sanzenin		
2007	Idol Janshi Suchie-Pai IV	Mari Kinoshita 木之下真理	PS1/PS2	
2007	Super Swing Golf 2nd shot!	Koo クー	Wii	
2007	Castle of Shikigami III	Nagino Ise	Wii	
2007	Final Fantasy IV	Palom and Porom	DS	
2008	Baccano!	Nancy lute ナンシー・リュート	DS	
2008	Ryu ga Gotoku Kenzan!	Haruka	PS3 character from Yakuza series	
2008	Rosario + Vampire: Tanabata's Miss Yokai Academy	Mizore Shirayuki	DS	
2008	Mobile Suit Gundam 00	Nena Trinity	DS	
2008	Star Ocean: The Second Story	Precis F. Neumann	PSP	
2008	Luminous Arc 2	Karen	DS	
2008	Da Capo II: Plus Situation/Plus Communication	Erica Murasaki	PS1/PS2	
2008	CR Sengoku Otome series	Akechi Mitsuhide	Pachinko game, also 2 in 2011	
2008	Tales of Symphonia: Dawn of the New World	Marta Lualdi	Wii	
2008	Persona 4	Rise Kujikawa	PS2/PS Vita	
2008–09	Akaneiro ni Somaru Saka games	Yuuhi Katagiri		
2008	Zettai Karen Children DS fourth of Children	Mio Tsukushi 筑紫澪	DS	
2008	Infinite Undiscovery	Vika	Xbox 360	
2008–10	Nogizaka Haruka no Himitsu games	Alistia Rein, Tōka Tennōji, Ayane Miyama? 深山彩音	PS1/PS2	
2008	Mobile Suit Gundam 00: Gundam Meisters	Nena Trinity	PS1/PS2	
2008	Crimson Gem Saga	Spinel	PSP	
2008	Valkyrie Profile: Covenant of the Plume	Tirute, Mireille, Michel ティルテ/ミレイユ/ミシェル	DS	
2009	Kemeko Deluxe!	Misaki Hayakawa	DS	
2009	Dengeki Gakuen RPG: Cross of Venus	Shana, Taiga Aisaka, Sabato Misuhashi	DS	
2009	X-Blades	Ayumi		
2009	Toradora Portable	Taiga Aisaka	PSP	
2009	Rosario + Vampire Capu2: The Rhapsody of Love and Dreams	Mizore Shirayuki	PS2	
2009	Shugo chara High spirits! Chara Nari rhythm ♪	Sakurai YuA 桜井優亜	DS	
2009	Magna Carta 2	Celestine Roa セレスティン・ロア	Xbox 360	
2009	Rune Factory 3	Mei 冥	DS	
2009–11	Queen's Blade: Spiral Chaos	Lana, Melona	PSP; Also Queen's Gate: Spiral Chaos in 2011	
2010	.hack//Link	Cello	PSP	
2010–15	Quiz Magic Academy series	Aiko	Starting from 7	
2010–15	Saki games	Yuki Kataoka	PSP	
2010–13	Hetalia: Axis Powers games	Liechtenstein		
2010	Inazuma Eleven games	Toramaru Utsunomiya		
2010	White Knight Chronicles II	Miu ミウ	PS3	
2010	Twinkle Crusaders Starlit Brave	Taiga Aisaka, Shana	PSP	
2010	The Legend of Heroes: Trails from Zero	KeA	PSP; Also Evolution in 2014	
2010–11	Umineko no Naku Koro ni games	Shannon		
2010	Shining Hearts	Melty	PSP	
2011	Tsukumonogatari	Ikari Emina 伊狩 恵美奈	PSP	
2011	Tales of the World: Radiant Mythology 3	Marta Lualdi	PSP	
2011	Kaitō Tenshi Twin Angel games	Kurumi Hazuki	PSP	
2011	The Legend of Heroes: Trails to Azure	KeA	PSP; Also Evolution in 2014	
2011	Deus Ex: Human Revolution	Eliza Cassan エリザ・カッサン		
2011–13	Ro-Kyu-Bu! games	Takadai NAMI 鷹代那美	PSP	
2012	Zero Escape: Virtue's Last Reward	Quark	3DS/PS Vita	
2012	Asura's Wrath	Mithra	PS3	
2012	Nendoroid Generation	Louise	PSP (from The Familiar of Zero)	
2012	Blades of time	Ayumi	PS3	
2012	Little King's Story	Verde ヴェルデ		
2012	Fire Emblem Awakening	Noire ノワール	3DS	
2012	Oreimo	Kanata Kurusu	PSP	
2012	Robotics;Notes	Airi	Also Elite in 2014	
2012	Aquapazza	Satsuki Yuasa / Camus 湯浅皐月/カミュ	PS3	
2012	Pokémon Mystery Dungeon: Gates to Infinity	Pikachu		
2012	Call of Duty: Black Ops 2	Samantha Maxis サマンサ・マクシス		
2013	Mugen Souls Z	Nao	PS3	
2013	Haiyore! Nyaruko-san Meijōshigatai Game no Yōna Mono	Hasuta		
2013	Tears to Tiara II: Heir of the Overlord	Tart	PS3	
2014	Super Heroine Chronicle	Kurumi Hazuki / White Angel, Koto, Aria H. Kanzaki, Louise		
2014	Granblue Fantasy	Vyrn, Vania and Afaka	Browser game, Android, iOS	
2014	Golden Time: Vivid Memories	VJ (Brigitte Jeomiria); VJ（ブリジット・ジェオミリア）		
2014	Persona Q: Shadow of the Labyrinth	Rise Kujikawa	3DS	
2014	Schoolgirl Strikers 2	Mosyne, Isari & Kagari Haishima	Mobile Games	
2014	Ryū ga Gotoku Ishin!	Haruka	PS3/PS4	
2014	Persona 4 Arena Ultimax	Rise Kujikawa	PS3	
2014	Chaos Rings III: Prequel Trilogy	Plica プリカ		
2014	Tales of the World: Reve Unitia	Marta Lualdi	3DS	
2014–15	Dengeki Bunko: Fighting Climax	Shana, Taiga Aisaka	Also Ignition	
2015	Dragon Quest Heroes: The World Tree's Woe and the Blight Below	Homiron		
2015	Persona 4: Dancing All Night	Rise Kujikawa		
2015	League of Legends	Annie		
2015	Girl Friend Beta: summer vacation to spend with you	Matsuri Kagami		
2015	Blade Arcus from Shining EX	Melty		
2015	Nitroplus Blasterz: Heroines Infinite Duel	Angela Balzac	from Expelled from Paradise	
2015	Fate/Grand Order	Oda Nobunaga, Cleopatra	Android, iOS	
2016	Punch Line	Meika Daihatsu		
2016	Dragon Quest Heroes II: Twin Kings and the Prophecy's End	Homiron		
2016	Tales of Berseria	Innominat (Laphicet Crowe)		
2016	Sengoku Otome: Battle Legend	Akechi Mitsuhide		
2016	Girls' Frontline	G41 / Gr G41(EN)	Android, iOS	
2017	YU-NO: A girl who chants love at the bound of this world	Mio Shimazu	PS4/PS Vita	
2017	Mobile Legends: Bang Bang	Layla	Android, iOS	
2017	Honkai Impact 3rd	Kiana Kaslana	Android, iOS, PC	
2018	Azur Lane	HMAS Vampire (D68), HMS Formidable, Iori Minase	Android, iOS	
2018	Sdorica	Sharice Carterwell, Sharice MZ, Puggi	Android, iOS	
2018	Fist of the North Star: Lost Paradise	Lin	PS4	
2018	Grand Chase: Dimensional Chaser	Elesis Sieghart	Android, iOS	
2018	Fire Emblem Heroes	Laevatein and Asbel	Android, iOS	
2018	The Legend of Heroes: Trails of Cold Steel IV	KeA Bannings キーア・バニングス	PS4	
2018	The King of Fighters All Star	Kagura	Android, iOS	
2019	Catherine: Full Body	DLC Catherine	PS4, PS Vita, Switch	
2019	Magia Record	Touka Satomi	Android, iOS	
2019	Atelier Lulua: The Scion of Arland	Stia	PS4, PC, Switch	
2019	Girls X Battle 2	Nona, Pandaria and KongMing	Android	
2019	The Seven Deadly Sins: Grand Cross	Eleven	Android, iOS	
2019	Punishing: Gray Raven	Luna	Android, iOS	
2019	Saint Seiya Awakening	Kiki	Android	
2020	Guardian Tales	Little Princess, Future Princess	Android, iOS	
2020	World's End Club	Pielope	iOS, Switch	
2020	Fitness Boxing 2: Rhythm and Exercise	Janice	Switch	
2020	Genshin Impact	Asmoday	Android, iOS, PC, PS4, PS5	
2020	Octopath Traveler: Champions of the Continent	Largo	Android, iOS	
2021	Valkyrie Connect	Fotma	Android, iOS, PC	
2021	Cookie Run: Kingdom	Strawberry Cookie	Android, iOS	
2021	SINoALICE	Harley Quinn		
2022	Counter:Side	Rosaria le Friede	Android, iOS, PC	
2022	Arknights	Irene	Android, iOS	
2022	Xenoblade Chronicles 3	Yuzuriha / Juniper	Nintendo Switch	
2022	Eiyuden Chronicles Rising	Mellore	Nintendo Switch, Playstayion4/5, Steam, Xbox One/X/S	
2022	Goddess of Victory: Nikke	Vesti / iDoll Ocean	Android, iOS	
2023	Street Fighter 6	Lily		
2023	Granblue Fantasy: Relink	Vyrn	PC, PS4, PS5	
2023	TEVI	Vena	PC, Switch, PS4, PS5, Xbox	
2024	Eiyuden Chronicles Hundred Heroes	Mellore	Nintendo Switch, Playstayion4/5, Steam, Xbox One/X/S	
2024	Jujutsu Kaisen: Cursed Clash	Momo Nishimiya		
2026	TopIsekai	Misty	Android, iOS	
2026	Girls' Frontline 2: Exilium	Faelynn	Android, iOS, PC	
2027	Honkai: Nexus Anima	Kiana	Android, iOS, PC	

== Dubbing ==
List of voice performances in overseas dubbing
Title	Role	Notes	Source
The Boss Baby	Story Bear	Theatrical Release version	
Bull	Taylor Rentzel		
Hayate the combat butler	Xiao Zhi / Sanqianyuan Zhi (小芷 / 三千院芷)	DVD version	
The Casagrandes Movie	Ronnie Anne Santiago		
Coming 2 America	Princess Tinashe Joffer		
Curious George Swings into Spring	Allie		
The Fabelmans	Sammy Fabelman (young)		
Fathers and Daughters	Katie Davis (Young)		
Game Shakers	Kenzie		
The Golden Compass	Lyra Belacqua	2010 TV Asahi edition	
The Hunger Games	Primrose Everdeen		
The Hunger Games: Catching Fire	Primrose Everdeen		
The Hunger Games: Mockingjay – Part 1	Primrose Everdeen		
The Hunger Games: Mockingjay – Part 2	Primrose Everdeen		
The Lego Movie 2: The Second Part	Bianca		
Lessons of a Dream	Klara Bornstedt		
The Loud House	Ronnie Anne Santiago		
Love, Death & Robots	Yan		
Men in Black 3	James Darrell Edwards III/Agent J (young)		
Oni: Thunder God's Tale	Tanukinta		
Peppa Pig	Peppa Pig		
Piranha 3D	Laura Forester		
Resident Evil: Extinction	White Queen		
Resident Evil: Retribution	Red Queen		
Ruby Gloom	Ruby Gloom		
Shark Lake	Carly Gray		
Stranger Things	Eleven		
Ticket to Paradise	Wren Butler		
The World of Happy Planet	The Great Soul		

List of voice performances in other dubbing
Title	Role	Notes	Source
∞ Puti Puti Petit Moe	Various characters	keychain toy	

=== Tokusatsu ===
List of voice performances in Tokusatsu
Year	Title	Role	Notes	Source
2017	Doubutsu Sentai Zyuohger Returns	Lilian	OV	
2018	Kaitou Sentai Lupinranger VS Keisatsu Sentai Patranger	Jim Carter		

=== Live-action ===
Year	Title	Role	Notes	Source
2019	Detective Zero	Karen Tsukikage (voice)	TV; episode 7	
2022	Yokaipedia	Ghost (voice)	Film	

== Discography ==
=== Albums ===
- Kokohadoko (June 20, 2012)

Track list:
1. "How I feel"
2. "Hane Uta Ai Hito" (ハネ・ウタ・アイ・ヒト)
3. "Foret Noire"
4. "Yume no Naka" (夢の中)
5. "Wonder"
6. "Orange" (オレンジ)

- Semete sora wo (せめて空を) (April 4, 2020)

=== Singles ===
- "Moete Koso Cosplay" (May 22, 2002) (with Sakura Nogawa, Saeko Chiba, Ai Shimizu, Akeno Watanabe and Chiaki Takahashi)
- "Kemeko Deluxe!" (October 29, 2008) (with Chiwa Saitō, Mikako Takahashi, Haruka Tomatsu, Ryoko Shiraishi, Ayako Kawasumi and Mai Goto)
- "Orange" (January 28, 2009) (Toradora! ending theme, with Yui Horie and Eri Kitamura)
- "Netsuretsu Kangei Wonderland" (May 27, 2009) (Saki ending theme, with Kana Ueda, Ami Koshimizu, Ryoko Shiraishi and Shizuka Itō)
- "Kimi e to Tsunagu Kokoro" (August 5, 2009) (Kanamemo opening theme, with Kaoru Mizuhara and Aki Toyosaki)
- "Karakoi ~Dakara Shoujo wa Koi wo Suru~" (September 9, 2009) (Titular song with Ryoko Shiraishi and "After Midnight" with Rie Tanaka)
- "buddy-body" (October 23, 2009) (Queen's Blade: Gyokuza wo Tsugu Mono ending theme, with Kanae Itō and Yūko Gotō)
- "LOVE × HEAVEN" (January 27, 2010) (Ladies versus Butlers! opening theme, with Mai Nakahara, Ami Koshimizu and Ayako Kawasumi)
- "Danna-sama to no Love-Love Love Song" (April 16, 2024) (Chillin' in Another World with Level 2 Super Cheat Powers opening theme)

=== Other appearances ===
- "I Wanna Be Your Ghost" (July 18, 2022) (Yokaipedia theme song) (background vocals)
