= List of Elemental Gelade characters =

This is a list of characters from the manga and anime series Elemental Gelade.

== Main characters ==
Coud Van Giruet
Voiced by: Akira Ishida (Japanese), Kristian Ayre (English), Naozumi Takahashi (Drama CD)
Coud Van Giruet (クード・ヴァン・ジルエット, Kūdo Van Jiruetto), better known as Coud (クー, Kū), is the protagonist of the story. He is a fifteen-year-old member of the Red Lynx sky pirates who has spiky hair and is always seen wearing his red lynx jacket. He is not allowed to come on raids because he has difficulty flying a plane; despite this, he aspires to become the new captain of the pirates and one of the greatest known sky pirates. Coud was homeless until the age of five, when he was found by the boss of the Red Lynx, who he came to look up to like a father. He takes what his boss tells him seriously, which is why he feels protecting Ren is so important. Since the Red Lynx sky pirates is a male-only ship, Coud never had the chance to interact with females until he met Ren. As a result, he is very shy around her, especially when they are alone together. When he vows to protect her, he also begins to have feelings for her, initially because he thought she was cute but later developing a stronger love for her. Everyone seems to know about his feelings, as when they are in Nad Lezen and he admits that he is in love with her, Kuea and Cisqua state that they already knew.
Coud finds Reverie Metherlence sleeping in a coffin-like box that was picked up as loot in a raid and falls in love with her, vowing to protect her on her journey to Edel Garden. Ren sees his sincere thoughts and actions and reacts with him so they could protect each other instead of only Coud protecting her. As the story progresses, Coud realizes that he is unable to fight efficiently with Ren because he drains too much of her power with each attack, becoming a formidable fighter after he is taught what an Edel Raid is and what they are capable of doing. Coud's weapon is a sickle-like tool attached to a long flexible wire called Angel (pronounced "angle") because it is shaped and detachable from the rope like a fish hook. He uses it as a weapon when he is not reacted with Ren or as a means to stop him from falling. After Coud is killed by the three Edel Raids, who seek to make Ren their new queen, he is brought back to life when the previous queen of Edel Garden, Eve, sacrifices herself so that he can be together with Ren. By the end of the anime, Coud returns to Red Lynx with Ren, and they are last seen flying off into the moonlit sky on one of the Red Lynx choppers.
A running gag in the show is that Coud, despite being a sky pirate, is an infamously terrible pilot who frightens the rest of the cast whenever he has to control any sort of mechanized vehicle, including cars. However, he is skilled with tools and mechanics and improves as a pilot by the end of the anime.
Reverie "Ren" Metherlence
Voiced by: Mikako Takahashi (Japanese); Brenna O'Brien (English), Houko Kuwashima (Drama CD)
Reverie Metherlence (レヴェリー・メザーランス, Revurī Mezāransu), better known as Ren (レン), is an Edel Raid and the last direct descendant of the Metherlence bloodline. She is also one of the Seven Glittering Jewels (or Shichiko-hoju) that has not been seen for more than five hundred years. She recharges her powers through sleep, which happens to be fairly often. She also dislikes sweet food. Ren has one true desire - to go to Edel Garden.
Ren's Elemental Gelade is above her forehead; she once covered it by wearing a hood, but now covers it with a triangle patterned ribbon given to her as a child by a woman named Sha. In volume three of the manga, the black market broker describes Ren's Elemental Gelade as jade green, but in certain light it has hints of blue. Characters who see it gaze at its beauty in awe, but in envy from some. When Ren reacts, she takes the form of a large blue sword like a "peacock's feather"; in the manga, the color of the sword is the same malachite color as her Elemental Gelade and appears more organic, as opposed to the anime's more angular blade. Like her description, she is light as a feather and can cut even steel with precision and speed like the wind itself, befitting of her attribute of Wind.
She first appears after Coud finds her in a coffin-like box that the Red Lynx sky pirates stole in one of their routine raids. She had been sealed away by a sealing charm for an unknown amount of time, later revealed to be five hundred years, and as such is unfamiliar with modern-day objects like "flying machines". Ren at first loathes humans, whom she believes to either use Edel Raids only as tools or hate them because they can be a destructive force. However, she soon realizes that she was wrong as she travels with Coud, Cisqua, Rowen, and Kuea, who fight to protect her and other Edel Raids from danger. Over the course of the series, she shows more emotion and falls in love with Coud; in the anime, their love is able to break the control of the three Edel Raids of Chaos Choir's control over Ren. At the end of the anime, she leaves Edel Garden and joins the Red Lynx sky pirates with Coud and is last seen flying off with Coud, saying that they will go beyond the stars together.
Cisqua
Voiced by: Nana Mizuki (Japanese); Alexandra Carter (English), Ikue Otani (Drama CD)
Cisqua (シスカ, Shisuka) is the energetic and upbeat leader of one of Arc Aile's Edel Raid Complete Protection Association squads, consisting of Rowen and Kuea. She is honest and passionate about her work, but only because of her desire to be promoted and her love for money. In the manga, she confesses that she wants money only because her poor family with many brothers and sisters needs it and her older sister had left. In Elemental Gelade ~Flag of Bluesky~, it is revealed that Merfond Librodec is Cisqua's older sister, who also shares her drive to make money. Cisqua is modeled from a character the creator drew in middle and high school and B.B. Hood from the Darkstalkers series.
Cisqua is not an Edel Raid pleasure, but she is well versed in martial arts and gunmanship. Despite having a small frame, she is physically strong and capable on taking down well trained pleasures such as the Edel Raid hunter, Wolx Hound. Underneath her robes and hat, she keeps an arsenal of firearms, missiles, knives, and other weapons she uses to complete her missions. Cisqua's gun can be adjusted to become a launcher, shotgun, or machine gun.
In the manga, Cisqua admitted that she once thought of Edel Raids as tools, but began to think otherwise once she started to hang around Edel Raids like Kuea and Challo and realized that Edel Raids are just like her - living beings with emotions. She makes a promise to Ren that she will safely bring her to Edel Garden; upon their arrival at Edel Garden, Cisqua is allowed to take her into custody. In the anime, Cisqua befriended one of the young Edel Raids living in Arc Aile's protection facilities while training to become a guardian. Believing that Edel Raids should not be used as tools, Cisqua refused to react with her friend and left with the memory of her Edel Raid friend crying. She follows Coud and Ren, believing that she will figure out the reason why her friend was crying by observing their relationship.
Cisqua is often worried about the amount of money that her team has. She even asks the Arc Aile general for a one-month vacation in order to fulfill her promise to Ren; the General denies her the vacation, but Lieutenant Cruz allows them permission for the vacation due to his kind nature. Despite the age difference between them, Cisqua seems to fantasize often about Lieutenant Cruz; in the manga, she describes him to Coud as what her dream guy would be like. Her older sister is Merfond Librodec from Flag of Blue Sky.
Rowen
Voiced by: Yuji Ueda (Japanese); Philip Pacaud (English), Shoutarou Morikubo (Drama CD)
Rowen (ローウェン, Rōwen), also known as Ro by his friends, is a guardian of Arc Aile and Kuea's pleasure. He is occasionally tasked to assist with his senior in rank, Cisqua. He is a young blond-haired man that tends to dislike conflict. In contrast to the impulsive and somewhat outrageous Cisqua, Rowen is logical, polite, and considerate of others. His friends believe he is perfect in everything he does, but he realizes there are flaws for trying to perfect everything while training at Arc Aile.
Rowen appears to be the most ordinary member of the group and is skilled at cooking. Since they are always low on money, Rowen usually ends up performing odd jobs to make ends meet. He was born into a wealthy family living in comfort, but, for an unknown reason, joined Arc Aile. He is seen unused to hard work and the outdoor life, like being afraid of bugs.
In the manga, Rowen shows genuine concern and romantic feelings for Viro; this allows him to relate to Greyarts later on, when Greyarts attempts to take revenge on him for the death of his Edel Raid partner.
Kuea / Kullweet Envatilia
Voiced by: Naoko Suzuki (Japanese); France Perras (English), Akemi Okamura (Drama CD)
Kullweet Envatilia (キュリート・エンヴァティリア, Kyurīto Envatiria), better known as Kuea (キーア, Kīa), is a first class Edel Raid from Arc Aile and Rowen's partner. Her garnet red Elemental Gelades are on the back of her hands, which she covers with arm-length gloves. Out of the five main characters, Kuea has the most sex appeal due to wearing revealing clothes, with the creator modeling her character after a male character she once drew in the past. Unlike the other main characters in the anime, besides Coud, Kuea does not change her outfit. When Kuea gets hungry, she is unable to React, so she eats enormous amounts of food at a time. It is an ongoing gag that she will eat anything and anyone, nibbling on Cisqua or Rowen when she is extremely hungry.
Kuea loves to battle and is hasty to fight. When reacted, she increases Rowen's fighting speed. Her weapon form are double blades that Rowen wields on each hand and six chained sickles on his back which can detach and attack opponents from a distance. Rather than slicing, her attacks are designed to pierce.

== Minor characters ==
Beazon (ビーゾン, Biizon)
Voiced by: Kazuhiro Nakata (Japanese); Scott McNeil (English)
Beazon is the self-proclaimed lord of El Blanca. He suppresses the villagers by forcing them to pay for his steam power with their own daughters after he blocked the path of the wind blowing their windmill. He then sells the girls to a black market dealer for large sums of money. Beazon kidnaps Ren at night after he is tipped off by a villager who allowed Coud and Ren to rest at his house. He seeks power and only sees Parl as a mere tool to be used. After he discovers that Ren is the Shichiko-Hoju, he battles Coud in an attempt to gain more power, but is defeated after Coud discovers the Song, Euros Loop, which destroys his manor. He was assumed dead until later volumes reveal that he has survived, albeit injured and driven insane, as he now harbors a pathological fear of all Edel Raids.
In the anime, he is the lord of an unnamed village, whose only appearance is during the first five episodes of the series. Due to this, he appears to have died after Coud's final battle with him inside his castle.
Parl / Partin Cels (パール / パーティン・セルス, Paaru / Paatin Serusu)
Voiced by: Hyo-sei (Japanese); Sharon Alexander (English)
Parl is a weak Edel Raid, compared to Kuea and Ren, and Beazon's partner. In the anime, Parl is a Sting Raid instead. When reacting with Beazon, Parl creates a large lion head cannon on his left hand and a giant sword on his other arm. She becomes a Sting Raid because Beazon wanted power and she wanted to be that power to show him her love. However, Beazon thinks of her as just a tool, completely obsessed with obtaining Ren's power after discovering her. After Parl's Elemental Gelade (Sting Raid crest in the anime) is shattered by Coud's attack, she becomes a normal human again.
In the anime, after Beazon's final battle with Coud, she manages to survive and seemingly reforms, as she smiles at Cou and Ren as they flee the crumbling castle. By the end of the episode, she is later shown bandaging her arm sitting atop the rubble at the episode's end. Towards the end of the anime, she later joins the Red Lynx sky pirates and seems to be paired with Boss.
In the manga, she reappears later with bandages on her face. The incident at Beazon's manor has also left her mentally unstable and she appears to suffer from an inferiority complex towards Ren, and by extension, all Shichiko-Hoju. She harbors a single-minded vendetta against Coud and Ren and seems obsessed with the notion of defeating them in order to prove that a normal Edel Raid can surpass the power of a Shichiko-Hoju.
Wolx Hound (ヴォルクス・ハウンド, Vurukusu Haundo)
Voiced by: Ryotaro Okiayu (Japanese); Jason Simpson (English), Katsuyuki Konishi (Drama CD)
Wolx Hound is an Edel Raid hunter. He wears a large black coat, has a large scar covering a large portion of his face, and prizes his motorcycle, which he calls the "Wolx Impulse EV (Wiev)". He shows a cold demeanor to everyone except for his Edel Raid, Tilel, but only when they are alone. To others, he claims Edel Raids are just "tools" to be used.
In the anime, Wolx is a high-ranking mercenary hired by Chaos Choir to assist them in capturing Edel Raids. He makes his first appearance searching for an Edel Raid named Selena. After he completes his job, he is assigned to capture Ren, only to find Coud alone.
In the manga, Wolx attacks and injures Sunweld and kidnaps Challo, also kidnapping Kuea using a sealing charm. However, before he can complete the deal with a black market broker, he is interrupted by Cisqua.
In both the anime and manga, he admits defeat after Tilel protects him from a shell fired by Cisqua, after which he reforms and helps Coud get to Edel Garden. At the end of the anime, Wolx has agreed to work with Arc Aile, last seen attacking an unknown enemy while reacting with Tilel.
Tilel / Tickle Selvatlos (チルル / ティクル・セルヴァトロス, Chiruru / Tikuru Seruvatorosu)
Voiced by: Rie Kugimiya (Japanese); Jocelyne Loewen (English), Mika Kanai (Drama CD)
Tilel is Wolx Hound's Edel Raid. She appears as a tiny girl with two large red disks in her green hair. Even though Wolx claims she is just a "tool" and he can replace her at any time, she insists that he is the strongest, smartest, and sharpest man alive and becomes jealous when Wolx was inspecting Kuea's Gelade. She is fixed on nobly protecting Wolx from harm, vowing to travel alongside him no matter the circumstances. Tilel has the unique ability to distinguish who is an Edel Raid, helping Wolx with his line of work. In her reacted form, she appears as a giant toy pico-pico hammer that can disassemble into twelve hovering disks which can block and attack from a distance. She is classified as a djinn defender because she is an Edel Raid of defensive superiority.
In the anime, it is revealed that she lived a life of poverty until she was taken in by Wolx. At the anime's end, she and Wolx are now working for Arc Aile.
Rasati Tigres (ラサティ・ティグレス, Rasati Tiguresu)
Voiced by: Megumi Ogata (Japanese); Rebecca Shoichet (English), Romi Park (Drama CD)
Rasati is the undefeated champion of the bishop class in the illegal fighting arena Milliard Trey in Razfe Ankul. Ten years ago, the owner of Milliard Trey bought Lillia so she could react with an arena fighter, and Rasati vowed to become a fighter in Lillia's place. As a deal with the owner, she fights to earn money and pay for her and Lillia's freedom, as well as pay back the money that her father owed. Rasati at first fights on her own, being strong enough to take down even Pleja. After defeating Coud in the arena, she earns enough money to free Lillia, but is tricked. Lillia reacts with Rasati to finally earn their freedom. In the anime, she later reappears during the final battle, now fighting for Arc Aile while wearing their symbol around her neck. Along with Wolx, she paves the way for Coud and the others to rescue Ren from Chaos Choir. At the anime's end, Rasati is last seen trying on "women's" clothing with Lillia, something she was not very comfortable with due to them not suiting her.
Lillia Tigres (リィリア・ティグレス, Rerea Tiguresu)
Voiced by: Yuko Sasamoto (Japanese); Justine Wong (English), Kumi Sakuma (Drama CD)
Lillia is an Edel Raid who was abandoned and found by Rasati. She was adopted into the Tigres family and lived a happy life until their parents died, after which Rasati's uncle sold Lillia to a rich man for an undisclosed sum of money because she was an Edel Raid. Since then, she has worked as a maid in his mansion and ridiculed by the other maids for her clumsiness, but they refrain themselves from bullying her due to being afraid of Rasati. She visits the arena to cheer for Rasati, but she cannot stand to see her get hurt.
In the anime, instead of being sold by her uncle, their father died with a large debt, with her working as a waitress at a restaurant to earn money and pay off the debt. She reappears to help Rasati and those of Arc Aile combat Chaos Choir and help Coud get to Edel Garden, now dressed as a nurse with the Arc Aile symbol on her hat. At the anime's end, she helps Rasati try on women's clothing now that they have no reason to fight anymore. However, unlike Lillia, Rasati is uncomfortable in women's clothes, despite Lillia saying she was cute.
Viro / Virzoeve Eclairouer (フィロ / フィアズーフ・エクリロール, Firo / Fiazuufu Ekurirooru)
Voiced by: Tomoe Hanba (Japanese); Chiara Zanni (English), Yukari Tamura (Drama CD)
Viro is a young girl with long purple hair and large glasses. She helps Coud and quickly becomes acquainted with the other members of the group. Viro is later revealed to be a spy for the opposing group who has their eyes on Ren, but is able to travel with the party with little suspicion because of her clumsy and air-headed qualities.
In the anime, Viro becomes infatuated with Coud and his kind personality and soon becomes hesitant in carrying out her mission. Viro reacts with Coud to take the form of a large bluish drill-like weapon around his right arm. She sacrifices herself to save Coud from an attack by Gladius, but is remembered by other characters, with Cisqua looking at a photo of her while writing a letter in the final episode.
In the manga, she turns on the party despite Rowen's attempts to save her. In the end, she turns to dust after her core stone is broken, stating that "Viro" is not her name, but a term for all human women with artificial Elemental Gelades. Her saliva is poison to Edel Raids.
Gladius (グラディアス, Guradiasu)
Voiced by: Ken Narita (Japanese); Trevor Devall (English)
Gladius is an enforcer and punisher of Chaos Choir. In the anime, he is able to materialize a sword, but it is not revealed if the sword is an Edel Raid. He arrives to kill Lonble and battles the group at the Buffalo Festival. With his Darkness Edel Raid, Idwy, and superior skills, he overpowers the group until Ren and Coud throw him off balance with a light attribute attack, which Idwy was vulnerable to, and finish him off. He escapes, but, back at Orga Night Headquarters, is killed by Grayarts and his new light-attribute Edel Raid, which impale him with multiple energy blades.
Grayarts (グレイアーツ, Gureiaatsu)
Voiced by: Kosuke Toriumi (Japanese); Andrew Francis (English)
Grayarts is an assassin and Cocovet's Edel Raid pleasure. He is assigned a mission to kill Coud and capture Ren, but only knows their names and the color and shape of Ren after she reacts. Because of this, he suspects Kuea and Rowen, who pretends to be Coud to find out what his mission is and manages to defeat him.
In the anime, he and Cocovet were killed together.
In the manga, Grayarts' arms were severed as punishment for failing his mission. He reappears after Gladius is beaten by the group and kills him with arms apparently manifested by his new Edel Raid, as his new Edel Raid was light-attribute. He wears Cocovet's Elemental Stone as a pendant.
Cocovet / Cicoria Cor Wetvie (ココウェット / チコーリア・コル・ウェットヴィ, Kokowetto / Chikooria Koru Wettovu)
Voiced by: Hitomi (Japanese); Kelly Metzger (English)
Cocovet is an Edel Raid who reacts with Grayarts. After reacting, she appears as a long curved sword. She is able to amplify Greyart's voice while they are chanting their song and attacks with sonic waves. She is killed after they fail their mission to assassinate Coud. Grayarts wears her Elemental Stone as a pendant.
The Broker
Voiced by: Yūko Satō (Drama CD)
The broker is an antique shop owner, but also a black market dealer involving young girls and Edel Raids. She wears dark robes and a large hat that covers most of her face. In the story, she deals with Beazon and Wolx Hound. She owns a pet monkey which sits on her shoulder. She is knowledgeable of Edel Raids and can tell the strength and type of an Edel Raid by looking at the battle form's shape and color.
Alma Gyurty (アルマ・ギュルティ, Aruma Gyuruti)
Voiced by: Yuka Shioyama (Drama CD)
Alma Gyurty is the broker's attendant and Lailei's pledger. She is tall, has short hair and heterochromatic eyes. She is first seen fighting Coud after he interrupts a transaction between the broker and Wolx.
Lailei / La Iil Leigansticht (ライレイ / ラ・イール・レイガンスティクト, Rairei / Ra Iiru Reigansutikuto)
Lailei is Alma's Edel Raid, who is talkative and mischievous. Lailei was designed to look like a monkey, so her hair is long like a tail and she sits on Alma's shoulder. Her Gelade is golden and on her ears and her battle form looks like a fan.
Lonble
An agent of Orga Night, he has twelve Edel Raids and is knowledgeable of their properties, capable of combining them to make different weapons like a fire sword. He is killed by Gladius along with his Edel Raids.

== Arc Aile members ==
General Falk (ファルク総監, Faruku soukan)
Voiced by: ? (Japanese); Michael Kopsa (English)
General Falk is head of the guardians of Arc Aile. He has a strict and cold attitude and has a very by-the-books mentality, in contrast with the more lax and progressive Cruz.
Lieutenant Cruz (クルス補佐官, Kurusu hosakan)
Voiced by: Youji Ueda (Japanese); Alistair Abell (English)
Lieutenant Cruz. Second under Falk, he is cheerful and lenient. He tends to think outside the rules and what is actually good for the progression of Arc Aile. Because of this, he allows Cisqua, Rowen, and Kuea to chase after Coud and Ren under the guise of a vacation. He later leads the peace treaty with Chaos Choir at the end of the series, unifying both Guardians and Edel Raids. Cisqua is in love with him.
Sunweld (サンウェルド, Sanwerudo)
Voiced by: Junichi Suwabe (Japanese); Kirby Morrow (English), Toshihiko Seki (Drama CD)
Sunweld is a member of Arc Aile, Cisqua and Rowen's senior officer, and Challo's pleasure. He has brown hair and a lukewarm personality and look. In the manga, he sustains a broken leg and cracked ribs in a fight with Wolx Hound. In the anime, he is beaten by three Sting Raids after he infiltrated Chaos Choir's headquarters.
Challo (Chaton Vad Wolsloth) (シャルロ(シャトン・バド・ウオルスローズ))
Voiced by: Hiromi Tsunakake (Japanese); Sharon Alexander (English), Akemi Kanda (Drama CD)
Challo is an Edel Raid and Sunweld's partner. She has pink hair and a green outfit. Her pink Gelade is on her right ankle. For an unknown reason, she is fond of Kuea. In the manga, she is captured by Wolx Hound after she and Sunweld are beaten by him. Challo's reacted form is in the shape of a rapier.
Myna (マイナ, Maina)
Voiced by: Hiroko Taguchi (Japanese); Maryke Hendrikse (English)
Myna is a guardian of Arc Aile who excels in sniping. She is also a friend and rival of Cisqua, as they trained together before they became guardians of Arc Aile. For an unknown reason, she finds Edel Raids revolting. In the anime, the friends reunite on a ship to Volcyone. She poisons Coud and a Sting Raid with a toxin that allows her to control their actions with a song; however, Cisqua discovers her plan and is forced to shoot her in order to save Ren.

== Flag of Blue Sky characters ==
Acheaburca Fuajarl
Achea is the princess of Fuajarl, whose father is Shinga, the king. She likes horseback riding and sword-fighting and has a pendant with a crystal in it that allows her to communicate with her childhood friend Idola, as well as her father's sword. She was exiled after being betrayed by the royals and her father was killed, and travels in search of power in order to reclaim her home.
Jelio "Jeen" Velsown
The Edel raid of Shinga and Achea, she is a Shichikou-hoju whose family has been serving the royal family for generations. Shinga's death affected her greatly, since the purpose of the attack was to kidnap her, but she hides it by acting cold. Her Gelade is onyx black and her weapon form is a sword which absorbs sunlight and resembles a sword dance when it moves. She is very skilled with throwing knives.
Merfond Librodec
A woman seeking to open a store in Fuajarl, which was destroyed by the attack. After getting arrested for fighting, she met Achea and helped them escape. In exchange for giving Shinga's sword to Achea, once she reclaims the throne she will build a new store on a first grade piece of land paid for by the royal family. Similarly to Cisqua, she carries explosives with her, and is later revealed to be Cisqua's older sister.
Puffe Runda
A short woman who is the mechanic for the "Race=Cradle". She was also one of the most trusted people to Shinga and serves as Achea's personal attendant.
Shinga
Achea's father, who was killed by the monarch of Edel Garden for refusing to surrender to Jeen.
Idola
Achea's childhood friend and source of strength, who guides her to gain more power.

== Anime original characters ==
Orfus (オーファス, Oofasu)
Voiced by: Yukie Maeda (Japanese); Laara Sadiq (English) (ep. 1-13) and Lisa Ann Beley (ep. 15-26)
Orfus is one of the three leaders of Chaos Choir, an Edel Raid who harbors hatred for humans. She has short brown hair and glasses, and her Edel Raid stone is located in the middle of her chest. She possesses a book written in ancient text which consists of the history and prophecies of Edel Garden as well as the powerful spells she casts. She reacts with Jilltail and Aljeena. Her ultimate plan was to use Ren's power to create a new world where Edel Raids ruled over humans. She kills Coud and severs the tie as Pleasure and Edel Raid; however, after Eve revives Coud, he and Ren's love awoke the forgotten song sung by humans and Edel Raids, breaking off Orfus and the others' react with Ren. At the anime's end, along with Jilltail and Aljeena, Orfus agrees to join forces with Arc Aile for a brighter future.
Jilltail (ジルテイル, Jiruteiru)
Voiced by: Kimiko Saito (Japanese); Sharon Alexander (English)
Jilltail is an Edel Raid and one of the leaders of Chaos Choir. She has long white hair and a dark complexion, and her Edel Raid stone is on her left shoulder. She reacts with Sting Raids to form spider-like legs on her back and attacks with a whip-like attack. Along with Aljeena and Orfus, she reacted with Ren when Coud's ties with Ren were severed. However, Coud and Ren singing the forgotten song broke the reaction. She joins forces with Arc Aile alongside the others for a brighter future.
Aljeena (アジェンナ, Ajenna)
Voiced by: Tomoko Fujino (Japanese); Tabitha St. Germain (English)
Aljeena is an Edel Raid and one of the leaders of Chaos Choir. She wears a red ribbon in her pink hair and carries a rabbit doll. Despite having a cute appearance, she is cruel to those who anger her. She attacks using Sting Raids as ammo in a cannon attached to her right arm. Along with Orfus and Jilltail, she reacts with Ren when Coud's ties are broken. After losing their reaction with Ren by Coud singing the forgotten song with her, Aljeena reforms and joins Orfus and Jilltail in forming peace with Arc Aile.
Eve (イヴ, Ivu)
Voiced by: Haruhi Terada (Japanese); Nicole Oliver (English)
Eve is the queen of Edel Garden, who is used against her will by the members of Chaos Choir. Her appearance is similar to Ren except her Gelade is blue. She has the power to create Sting Raids, which is the reason that Orfus and the others used her powers for years. Being on the verge of death, she calls Ren in her dreams to travel to Edel Garden and take her place. Coud follows Ren, and Eve learns of how greatly he loves Ren. After Orfus uses her reaction with Aljeena and Jilltail to kill Coud, Eve uses the last of her strength to revive Coud, apologizing for everything she had caused by calling to Ren. Even after death, Eve's spirit helped Coud break through to Ren and free her from Chaos Choir's control by helping him release the forgotten song.
Selena (セレナ, Serena)
Voiced by: Asami Sanada (Japanese); Nicole Bouma (English)
Selena is an Edel Raid with blonde hair and a blue Elemental Gelade on her lower left arm. She once lived at Arc Aile's protection facilities, a place that was said to be filled with happiness, but all she felt was loneliness. She flees the idealistic society to return to her home village, but is pursued by Edel Raid hunters like Wolx Hound. With the help of Coud and Ren, she safely returns home, only to discover that the home that she once lived in is occupied by an unknown person, the young children she used to play with have grown old, and her lover had died a year ago from old age. She blames Arc Aile for her sadness.
