= Kemeko Deluxe! =

Japanese manga series

ケメコデラックス! (Kemeko Derakkusu!)
- Genre: Harem, Romantic Comedy, science fiction
- Manga
- Written by: Masakazu Iwasaki
- Published by: ASCII Media Works
- Magazine: Dengeki Comic Gao! (former); Dengeki Daioh
- Original run: October 27, 2005 – June 27, 2011
- Volumes: 9
- Anime television series
- Directed by: Tsutomu Mizushima
- Written by: Yoshimi Narita
- Music by: Ryuji Takagi
- Studio: Hal Film Maker
- Licensed by: Crunchyroll
- Original network: ytv
- Original run: October 4, 2008 – December 20, 2008
- Episodes: 12
- icon

Kemeko Deluxe! (ケメコデラックス!, Kemeko Derakkusu!) is a Japanese manga series written and illustrated by manga artist Masakazu Iwasaki. The manga began serialization in the monthly shōnen manga magazine Dengeki Comic Gao! on October 27, 2005, and is published by MediaWorks. The first episode of the anime adaptation was broadcast on October 4, 2008.

== Story ==
=== Plot ===
Ten years before the events of the manga take place, 6-year old Sanpeita Kobayashi got engaged to his childhood friend, a mysterious pink-haired girl who promised they would meet again 10 years later, and she would become his bride. She then fed him a mysterious seed. Ten years after that day, Sanpeita has started to have dreams about his first love more and more. One day after the same dream, he wakes up to see robots crashing into his room, who are then defeated by a small but powerful robotic weird-looking girl. The girl identifies herself as "Kemeko" and tells him that from this day forth she is his bride. Remembering the girl from 10 years ago, Sanpeita at first doesn't believe that Kemeko is his first love, seeing as they look nothing alike (plus she also being a robot). However, when it is revealed that Kemeko is in fact a suit of robotic armor, piloted by a pink-haired girl named M.M., who greatly resembles his first love. Sanpeita is thrown into confusion as he tries to deduce M.M.'s real identity, despite her claiming of not having ever met him before. M.M., in the guise of Kemeko, instills herself into Sanpeita's life, moving in with him, becoming a teacher at his school, and likewise following him everywhere, presumably to protect him from the robots Mishima Electronics who are constantly targeting him for a mysterious power that he supposedly holds...

It is later revealed that M.M. stands for Mei Mishima, daughter of Souichiro Mishima, founder of Mishima Electronics. Ten years ago Mei, her father, and her twin sister Mai came to Earth in a spaceship. One day when her father was busy working Mei escaped from the spaceship to go sightseeing on Earth, only to get lost. Sanpeita and his friend, Izumi Makihara, then helped her get back home, and from there the three played together every day. One day, however, when Mei got lost inside the spaceship she discovered girls who looked exactly like her (and by extension her twin sister), asleep inside a row of test tubes. Mai then appeared, revealing that she had known about this and her father's projects, one of which included the "Nano Ball", a seed that when given time to germinate inside a host, was a source of limitless power. When their father arrives and warns them of the danger, Mai tells him that she has no intentions of stopping what he started, and that she plans to use the power of the Nano Ball to create a perfect world for her and her sister. Mai then hands the Nano Ball to Mei, despite their father's attempts to stop her, and Mei's memories, including all of her memories of playing with Sanpeita and Izumi, are obliterated by the power of the Nano Ball. Mei escapes, and their father, who has been mortally wounded by the Nano Ball, gives her Kemeko, and sends her off into space, telling her to forgive Mai. Since then Mei lived as one with Kemeko, dedicating her life to protecting Sanpeita and the Nano Ball inside him. However, living with him is a constant reminder of what she lost, and she is devastated by not being able to recall any of the memories with Sanpeita that she kept in her journal.

In the last volume, Sanpeita is kidnapped by Mai, who has become the president of Mishima Electronics, and taken to Mishima. Mai reveals that it was she, pretending to be her sister, who fed Sanpeita the Nano Ball seed 10 years ago—now she is here to unleash the incubated energies of the Nano Ball. By kissing him she unleashes the Nano Ball on the world, which causes strange plants to grow from every piece of Mishima equipment around the world, with which she plans to destroy the world and create a new, perfect world for herself and populate it with children of the Nano Ball. Her plans are put to end when Mei destroys Mai's Himiko, an advanced version of the Kemeko, and kisses Sanpeita to seal the power of the Nano Ball. In the aftermath, Mei forgives Mai and decides to allow her to be put in an intergalactic prison instead of killing her. Mei tells Sanpeita that she has fallen in love with him again and the two get engaged, this time for real.

=== Characters ===
Sanpeita Kobayashi (小林 三平太, Kobayashi Sanpeita)
Voiced by: Eri Kitamura

The main male protagonist. A high school student who still harbors feelings for a girl he met 10 years ago. His life was turned upside down when he was approached by Kemeko's pilot, who claimed to be his fiancé and moved into his house. He was then constantly targeted by unknown assailants. Whenever he's in life-threatening danger, the Nano-Ball, that was planted inside of him, activates its self-defense mechanism, unleashing power that always defeats any threat posed to him and propelling him to safety. Sanpeita is unaware that the Nano Ball resides inside him, and moments where the Nano Ball is active, there are simply only holes left in his memory, unaware what had happened. His personality is kind, but because of a number of misunderstandings that are out of his control, he is constantly physically assaulted by both family, friends, and enemies alike. His kindness has made him popular with the girls, that he is chased after by Izumi, Mei (who truly cares for him, and which later in the story, actually falls in love with him all over again - since she lost her memory of falling in love with him the first time around), Yukina Kamishiro, and, as well as, one of Tamako's friends (who stalks him). In the end, he falls in love with Mei and the two get engaged.

Kemeko (ケメコ, Kemeko)
Voiced by: Chiwa Saitō

A powerful combat robot suit, despite its chubby figure, piloted by M.M. (Mei Mishima). Since Mei rarely gets out from her robot suit Kemeko, everyone around Sanpeita thinks that Kemeko is actually a true person (her true form and not a robot suit). Her default paint scheme is a reference to the plugsuit used by Asuka Langley Soryu in Neon Genesis Evangelion. She has also been seen sporting a T-shirt with the NWO logo in Chapter 10.

M.M. (Mei Mishima) (エムエム, Emuemu)
Voiced by: Haruka Tomatsu

Kemeko's pilot, who happens to be a tall and attractive girl who somehow manages to fit in Kemeko's smaller body. Despite her claims to have never met Sanpeita before moving to his house, she seems to be somehow familiar to him. She also wears the same bandages on her cheek just like the girl from ten years ago. Another appearance they share in common is their hair color. She later reveals that her true name is Mei Mishima, daughter of Souichiro Mishima, founder of Mishima Electronics. Ten years ago she escaped from the spaceship (her home at the time) that she came to Earth in, so she could go sightseeing, and met Sanpeita and Izumi. As her memories were later erased by the Nano Ball, her memories of Sanpeita and Izumi remain only in a journal that she kept. Her inability to recall the memories in her journal is a source of great pain for her, and living with Sanpeita is a constant reminder of what she has lost. For this reason she is almost always inside Kemeko at the beginning of the series, but starts to come out more often as Sanpeita encourages her to be herself. Over the course of the series, she falls in love with Sanpeita all over again, and when she does come out of Kemeko, it is usually out of jealousy to compete with the numerous other girls that like Sanpeita. At the end of the series, she tells him that she loves him, and the two get engaged.

Izumi Makihara (牧原 イズミ, Makihara Izumi)
Voiced by: Mikako Takahashi

Sanpeita's very well-endowed childhood friend and classmate, who harbors a crush on him. She tries to show her feelings, but Sanpeita is apparently oblivious. Whenever something perverted happens to her, she yells out "Unhealthy", then decks whoever caused the action, which Sanpeita is almost always on the receiving end of her rage. Izumi recognizes the similarity between M.M. and "Mei-chan", her friend from 10 years ago, and pursues her true identity much more fervently than Sanpeita, even calling out Mei-chan and accusing her of being both the girl from 10 years ago and Kemeko in front of the whole school.

Tamako Kobayashi (小林 タマ子, Kobayashi Tamako)
Voiced by: Mai Goto

Sanpeita's little sister, who's responsible for the house chores. She is revolted at first after finding that her brother got himself a "girlfriend", but later she befriends Kemeko and welcomes her into the house, even calling her "sister".

Fumiko Kobayashi (小林 ふみ子, Kobayashi Fumiko)
Voiced by: Ayako Kawasumi

Sanpeita and Tamako's mother who works as a manga artist. Just like Tamako, she easily accepted Kemeko into the household, despite Sanpeita's protests.

Ryōko Kurosaki (黒崎 リョーコ, Kurosaki Ryōko)
Voiced by: Ryōko Shiraishi

A strange girl who is after the power hidden in Sanpeita. She carries a sword around and is not hesitant about using it. She is employed at Mishima, and is often seen with her black cat, Jyuumonji, who seems to be not an ordinary cat (like showing super strength). It turns out that Ryoko is also one of Sanpeita's classmates, but had not attended class since it started (not until she confronts Sanpeita and Kemeko). Also, even though Ryoko is a very skilled swordsman and fighter, it's also assumed that she can't swim.

Misaki Hayakawa (早川 美咲, Hayakawa Misaki)
Voiced by: Rie Kugimiya

Another one of Sanpeita's friends, who has also been Izumi's best friend since they were children. She is rather odd, with even Ryouta asking if she was human - during Chapter 5. She has a fetish in regards of being seen only wearing either her PE uniform or the school bathing suit. She seems to care for Izumi closely and even knowns of Izumi's true feelings for Sanpeita, encouraging her to act upon them. She also seems to come from a very rich family, which she has an older sister named Miura (who also has her own fetish).

Miura Hayakawa (早川, Hayakawa)
Voiced by: Mamiko Noto

Misaki's older sister, who has a fetish of wearing a maid outfit and acting like one, to the extent of making Sanpeita be her master.

Ryouta Minamino (南野 リョータ, Minamino Ryōta)
Voiced by: Fumie Mizusawa

Another friend of Sanpeita, who enjoys taking pictures. He tends to get beat up by the rest of the cast, and seems to have a crush on Ryoko.

Vanilla M. Repairs (ヴァニラ・M・リペアーズ, Vanira M Repeāzu)
Voiced by: Aya Endou

The executive director of Mishima Electronics. She has a cutesy attitude and seems to have a liking for younger boys. The "M." in her name stands for Make.

Kyte Brian Sounds (カイト・B（ブライアン）・サウンズ, Kaito Buraian Saunzu)
Voiced by: Umeka Shouji

The cool acting red head of the series. Kyte is the head of the third R&D Department at Mishima Electronics. He is a subordinate of Vanilla Make Repairs. He is very carefree, which is why he ignores orders from his higher-ups. He seems to have a relationship with Mei.

Kiriko (キリコ, Kiriko)
Voiced by: Kotono Mitsuishi

Kiriko is a robot similar to Kemeko, only with black hair and an eye-patch. It is piloted by Vanilla M. Repairs.

Aoi-chan (葵ちゃん, Aoi-chan)
Voiced by: Saeko Chiba

Fumiko's editor, who receives little recognition for her hard work. She has a boyfriend who she often has to cancel her dates with, in order to meet a manga deadline. However, in the anime, she complains that she broke up with her boyfriend due to the time they spend together in the "Summer Break" episodes.

== Media ==
=== Manga ===
The manga series began serialization in the Japanese shōnen manga magazine Dengeki Comic Gao! on October 27, 2005, published by MediaWorks. When Dengeki Comic Gao! ceased publication on February 27, 2008, the manga was transferred to its sister publication, Dengeki Daioh on April 21, 2008. The final bound volume was released on August 27, 2011. The volumes are published under ASCII Media Works' Dengeki Comics label.

=== Anime ===
An anime adaptation produced by the Japanese animation studio Hal Film Maker aired in Japan between October and December 2008. The anime spans the first two bound volumes, and nearly half of the third bound volume.

=== Video game ===
A Nintendo DS game called Kemeko Deluxe! DS: Yome to Mecha to Otoko to Onna (ケメコデラックス！DS ~ヨメとメカと男と女?~, lit. Kemeko Deluxe! DS: Bride, Mecha, Man and Woman) was published by 5pb. on February 26, 2009. Amazon Japan

=== Music ===
There are 3 different theme music
