= Astonishia Story =

- Developers: Sonnori; Compile Heart (PSP)
- Publishers: KOR: Sonnori; JP: Sega; NA/EU: Ubisoft
- Platforms: MS-DOS, GP32, Windows, PlayStation Portable
- Release: MS-DOS: KOR: July 1994; GP32: KOR: January 21, 2002; Windows: KOR: May 5, 2002; PlayStation Portable: KOR: August 12, 2005; AU: June 23, 2006; NA: June 27, 2006; EU: June 30, 2006; JP: September 28, 2006
- Genre: Role-playing
- Mode: Single-player

Astonishia Story (어스토니시아 스토리) is a series of 2D role-playing video games created by the Korean video game developer Sonnori. The first game in the series was released as Astonishia Story for MS-DOS in South Korea in 1994. A sequel, also for Windows, was released in July 1994 in South Korea under the title Astonishia Story: Forgotten Saga. In 2002, a remake of the original game, Astonishia Story R was published for the Korean GP32 handheld system. It was subsequently ported to the Windows and PlayStation Portable platforms.

The PlayStation Portable rendition of Astonishia Story R was released in 2005 as Astonishia Story, having been enhanced further and adjusted to fit the PSP's 16:9 screen ratio. The game has since been licensed by Ubisoft and was published in the United States on June 27, 2006, and in Europe on June 30, 2006. This was the first time that a game in the Astonishia Story series has made it to the West.

== Plot ==
100 years ago the Life Tree died and the elves began to die out. Brimhil, the eternally youthful queen of the elves, gave up her youth to revive the Tree. 100 years later, in the present, elves are being mistreated by humans and a half-elf Francis De La Cross attempts to obtain the power of the god-like creature to turn the tables and restore Brimhil's youth before she dies.

A young knight named Sir Lloyd von Roiental is transporting a holy staff known as the Wand of Kinan (카이난의 지팡이). He is ambushed and the staff is stolen by Francis, and Lloyd goes off to recover it. Along the way, he is joined by several other people who join his quest for different reasons.

== Development and release ==
A remake titled Astonishia Story Refine was announced in May 2024 at Play Expo. It was developed by Daewon Media with supervision from the original game's development team, including director Lee Wonsul. It was released on 18 December 2025 for Windows and Nintendo Switch. NIS America published the game for international release under the title Astonishia Story, releasing it for PlayStation 5, Nintendo Switch, Nintendo Switch 2, and Windows via Steam on 11 February 2027.

== Reception ==
Reception

Aggregate scores
Aggregator	Score
GameRankings	50.76%
Metacritic	48/100

Review scores
Publication	Score
Edge	4/10
Electronic Gaming Monthly	4/10
Eurogamer	3/10
Game Informer	4.25/10
GameRevolution	D
GameSpot	6/10
GameSpy	2.5/5
GameZone	6/10
IGN	5.5/10
Official U.S. PlayStation Magazine	1.5/5

The PSP version was met with mixed reception upon release, as GameRankings gave it a score of 50.76%, while Metacritic gave it 48 out of 100. The English translation was considered very poor as it is full of grammatical errors.

== Legacy ==
The sequel to Astonisha Story is titled Crimson Gem Saga in English and Garnet Chronicle in Japan.
