= Mugen Puchipuchi =

Japanese bubble wrap keychain toy

Mugen Puchipuchi (∞(むげん)プチプチ; Infinite Bubble Wrap) is a Japanese bubble wrap keychain toy by Bandai. The term "puchipuchi" serves as a generic trademark for bubble wrap, but is also onomatopoeia for the sound of bubbles being popped.

The square-shaped toy has eight buttons that make a popping sound when pressed, and is designed to mimic the sensation of popping bubble wrap for an infinite number of times. It is made of a double-layer silicone rubber structure to create a similar feeling to bubble wrap. It also plays a sound effect for every 100 pops; these sound effects include a “door chime”, “barking dog”, “fart”, and “sexy voice”. Bandai worked with the company behind Puchipuchi bubble wrap to create a design that is most realistic to real bubble wrap.

Bandai has also created other keychain toys based on Mugen Puchipuchi, such as Puchi Moe, Mugen Edamame, and Mugen Periperi. The original Mugen Puchipuchi has also been marketed in Europe and North America as "Mugen Pop-Pop".

== Puchi Moe ==
Puchi Moe is an anime-themed version of the original Mugen Puchipuchi. The random sound effects have been replaced by one of four anime characters' voices. The different types, each based on an anime character archetype, are a childhood friend, French maid, tsundere, and younger sister.

Puchi Moe was created for the lucrative otaku market. All four character voices are done by voice actress Rie Kugimiya.

== Mugen Chocolate ==
Mugen Chocolate (∞チョコレート, Infinite Chocolate) simulates the experience of snapping pieces off of a chocolate bar. It is designed to look like one of three varieties of Meiji chocolate bar: milk chocolate, Himilk chocolate, and white chocolate.

== Mugen PuchiPuchi AIR ==
It is larger than the original Mugen Puchipuchi, and has air-filled buttons to more closely mimic the feel of bubble wrap. It plays one of seven special sounds every fifty pops and requires two LR44 batteries to operate. A special edition featuring either My Melody, Kuromi, or Cinnamoroll was released, that plays the featured character's voice with every pop.

== Mugen Edamame ==
Mugen Edamame (∞(むげん)エダマメ, Infinite Soybeans) has beans inside a pod that appears similar to edamame. Squeezing the pod causes a bean to pop out, showing one of twelve faces, which are pre-set and randomly packaged. Unlike Mugen Puchipuchi, it does not play sounds when pushed.

== Mugen Periperi ==
Mugen Periperi (∞(むげん)ペリペリ, Infinity Ripping) mimics the tear strip of a cardboard box that is ripped to open the box. Mugen Periperi was made available on 22 November 2008.

== Mugen Beer & Mugen Soda ==
Mugen Beer & Mugen Soda (∞缶ビール & ∞ソーダ, Infinite beer & Infinite Soda) simulates the experience of opening the pull tab of a soda or beer can. One of three special sounds plays for every thirty pulls. It requires two LR44 batteries to operate.

== Mugen Pikmin Pull-Out ==
Infinite Pikmin Pull-Out DX & Infinite Pikmin Pull-Out Lite (∞ひっこぬきピクミン DX & ∞ひっこぬきピクミン Lite) lets you infinitely uproot pikmin from a plastic dirt block. The DX version is larger and plays sounds, with special sounds playing more rarely. The Lite version is smaller, comes attached to a keychain and does not play sounds.

== Ouchi de Mugen Puchi Puchi Wii ==
On 24 June 2008, Bandai released a video game version for the Nintendo Wii via WiiWare. The game's title, Ouchi de Mugen Puchi Puchi Wii (おうちで∞プチプチWii), roughly translates to "In-Your-Home Infinite Bubble Wrap Wii".
