= Kaitō Tenshi Twin Angel =

2008 manga and anime series

- Cover of the first manga volume

快盗天使ツインエンジェル
- Genre: Magical girl
- Manga
- Written by: Monako Serasai
- Published by: Kadokawa Shoten
- Magazine: Comp Ace
- Original run: 2007 – 2009
- Volumes: 3
- Original video animation
- Directed by: Tatsuyuki Nagai
- Written by: Hideyuki Kurata
- Music by: Ken'ichirou Ooishi
- Studio: Nomad
- Released: September 18, 2008 – October 2, 2008
- Runtime: 30 minutes per episode
- Episodes: 2
- Anime television series

Twin Angel: Twinkle Paradise
- Directed by: Yoshiaki Iwasaki
- Written by: Michiko Itou
- Studio: J.C.Staff
- Original network: TV Kanagawa
- Original run: July 5, 2011 – September 20, 2011
- Episodes: 12
- Original video animation

Twin Angel: Kyun Tokimeki Paradise!!
- Directed by: Yoshiaki Iwasaki
- Produced by: Jun'ichirō Tamura; Yuji Matsukura
- Written by: Michiko Itou
- Music by: Shinkichi Mitsumune
- Studio: J.C.Staff
- Released: January 30, 2015
- Runtime: 30 minutes
- Episodes: 2
- Anime television series

Twin Angel Break
- Directed by: Yoshiaki Iwasaki
- Written by: Michiko Itou
- Music by: Gin
- Studio: J.C.Staff
- Original network: Tokyo MX, TV Aichi, KBS, Sun TV, BS11, TVQ
- Original run: April 7, 2017 – June 23, 2017
- Episodes: 12

Kaitō Tenshi Twin Angel (快盗天使ツインエンジェル, Kaitō Tenshi Tsuin Enjeru; lit. Phantom Thief Angels: Twin Angel) is a series of slot machine games from TRIVY Corporation, and later Sammy. It has been adapted into a manga and two anime series.

== Plot ==
Haruka and Aoi are a pair of friends who become the magical Twin Angels in order to fight off evil as the Red and Blue Angels. Their story revolves heavily around tracking down and protecting Seven Amulets; magical pieces of jewelry capable of generating immense power when assembled from a mysterious man known only as Black Trader and his subordinates. They are eventually joined by Kurumi the White Angel.

In the new season, Kurumi (in the form of a hedgehog) seeks the help of Meguri Amatsuki and Sumire Kisaragi as the Rose and Sapphire Twin Angels-in-training, when Haruka and Aoi go missing. This story is about hunting down a mysterious woman known as Mary and her pawns that aim to revive a demon ruler by collecting medals contained with innocent energy sources.

== Characters ==
=== Protagonists ===
Haruka Minazuki (水無月 遥, Minazuki Haruka)
Voiced by: Yukari Tamura
The spunky and energetic red-headed protagonist. Haruka has a caring, get-going sort of personality that compels her to seek out and help people even when not asked. She is prone to being occasionally ditzy and air-headed but is generally quite wise and worldly. Her alias is Red Angel. She mainly attacks using superhuman strength, agility, and powerful kicks enhanced by red flames which add jet-propulsion to her kicks. Her main attack is the Angel Tornado a powerful flying kick.
Aoi Kannazuki (神無月 葵, Kannazuki Aoi)
Voiced by: Mamiko Noto
A quiet and polite girl with blue hair. Aoi is the reserved foil to Haruka and occasionally the voice of reason. She comes from a very rich and respected family, her grandmother is their private school's principal and the previous Angel in her position. She is also well attended to by a one-eyed warrior butler named Heinojou who has a habit of appearing out of nowhere to tend to her. Her alias is Blue Angel. She attacks using a magical bow and arrow called Angel Arrow which can produce infinite arrows that can split upon firing.
Kurumi Hazuki (葉月 クルミ, Hazuki Kurumi)
Voiced by: Rie Kugimiya
A young genius with black hair and green eyes, she is Aoi's distant cousin who transferred straight from St. Bernardi elementary in Italy. She has a tsundere personality. She takes great pride in her and Aoi's work as Twin Angel and often bumps heads with Haruka who she feels is too crude and weak to be Aoi's partner. She grows to like her as well however. Her alias is White Angel. She apparently doesn't require a Poketen (a hand-held device needed for transformation) to transform. She fights using cat-faced gunpowder bombs.
Tenshi-chan (天使ちゃん)
Voiced by: Saori Sakura
The spirit living inside their poketens, the magical devices the girls use to transform.
Yuito Kisaragi (如月 唯人, Kisaragi Yuito) / Misty Knight (ミスティナイト, Misuti Naito)
Voiced by: Nobuyuki Hiyama
The handsome school president. He assists the Twin Angels as a Tuxedo Mask-inspired hero. His main weapons are blue roses he apparently cuts from folded paper. Haruka has a crush on him. He often acts as a Deus Ex Machina either working off-screen to happily resolve a conflict or rendering assistance at exactly the right moments. He is apparently from a rich family yet much of his time is spent doing odd and occasionally humiliating part-time jobs.

=== St. Cherine Academy ===
Yayoi Shinmon (新門 弥生, Shinmon Yayoi)
Voiced by: Yukari Minegishi
A member of the school newspaper club, she has brown pigtails and glasses. She constantly tries to photograph big scoops mostly involving Twin Angel but all her photos either come out blurry or out of focus.
Nyan Tomochi (戸持 娘, Tomochi Nyan)
Voiced by: Saori Goto
A young green-haired girl who wears a distinctive beanie with cat ears. She is a typical clumsy girl. She takes care of a magical giant Japanese salamander.
Ms. Saijo (西条 先生, Saijo-Sensei) / Black Carrier (ブラック キャリア, Burakku Kyaria)
Voiced by: Yuu Asakawa
The lonely school teacher of Twin Angel. She is in her late twenties and is wracked by fears that she will never get married and earning enough money to make a living. She is eventually hired by Black Trader as Black Carrier. She is a formidable fighter in hand-to-hand and employs her own set of robots. Despite that she is very caring and noble, she avoids committing any serious crime and even cleans up any destruction she causes. She falls in love with Black Trader but gives up on him when she realizes that he is not a good person.

=== Recurring antagonists ===
Salome (サロメ, Sarome)
Voiced by: Ryoko Shintani
A gothic-lolita dressed blonde girl who served as the Twin Angel's first opponent before she was fired and exiled to the South Pole by Black Trader. She fought entirely using specially constructed giant robots. She is assisted by her bumbling, masochistic servant Alexander who is infatuated with her. She neither particularly abusive or ungrateful towards him but he seems to enjoy throwing himself into unpleasant circumstances for her sake.
Tesla Violet (テスラ・ヴァイオレット, Tesura Vaioretto) / Nine Violet (ナイン・ヴァイオレット, Nain Vaioretto)
Voiced by: Yui Horie
Voiced by: Ryoka Yuzuki
Black Trader's Twin Phantom. Tesla is the eldest, and Nine is the youngest of the Violet sisters. Tesla has long aqua-colored hair and fights using electric powers, and Nine has short aqua-colored hair and fights using a large magical sword. She rarely speaks, but likes animals. The sisters lost their parents in an arson incident, but were 'rescued' by Black Trader who adopted them when he had lied to them about the Twin Angels being responsible. Nine became close to Haruka not knowing she is a Twin Angel. Discovering Black Trader's true colors, Nine and Tesla changed allegiance to Twin Angels.
Black Trader (ブラックトレーダー, Burakku Toreda)
Voiced by: Rikiya Koyama
The mysterious antagonist who seeks the Seven Amulets and tries to destroy the Twin Angels. He was an assistant to Oscar Violet, the Violet sisters' father, into researching the amulets, but the two were often in conflict about it.
Mary (メアリ / オギノメ アリ, Marī)
Mary is the sexy demonic leader of the Four Heavenly Kings and the most frequent antagonist against Meguru and Sumire. She poses as the nurse of St. Cherine Academy under the alias Ari Oginome. Mary later somehow deduces the Twin Angels' identities and attempts using a despaired Meguru as a catalyst for the energy sources Mary collected from innocent humans in order to revive her beloved Zelucifer, a great demon. When her mission fails, she activates a dead man's switch summoning a destructive ship that rages upon the earth. In a cliffhanger, she was presumed to have survived(in an ant form), along with Veil and Nui's dolls before they are found by a silhouette (possibly Zelucifer).
Veil (ベール, Vail) / Nui (ヌイ, Nue)
Twin pop idols stage name Twenty-Eight. Veil and Nui are silver-haired siblings who are talent and hard-working. In reality the twins are dolls given life by Mary and since collaborate promising them full body flesh. They enroll at St. Cherine Academy to further access energy. Meguru and Veil form a bond, but Nui and Sumire are seen as foes. Meguru discovers Veil's secret yet she accepts her. As Meguru has the siblings see the error of their ways, they renounce Mary, and tragically she detonates the bodies. Misty Knight installed the dolls in Mary's weapon ship to intercept the berserk and save the earth. In a cliffhanger, the dolls are found by a silhouette (possibly Zelucifer).

=== Twin Angel Break characters ===
Meguru Amatsuki (天月めぐる, Amatsuki Meguru) / Angel Rose (エンジェルローズ, Enjerurōzu)
Voiced by: M.A.O
Meguru is a resident of Chiichi Island who moved to Tokyo. Her personality strikingly resembles Haruka's. One of her hobbies is photography. In the past, Meguri witnessed the Twin Angels flying and idolize to become one too. It is revealed Meguri descended from some sort of religious cult and she and Sumire have met in their youth.
Sumire Kisaragi (如月すみれ, Kisaragi Sumire) / Angel Sapphire (エンジェルサファイア, Enjerusafaia)
Voiced by: Ai Kayano
Sumire is Yuito's younger sister. She serve as Meguri's Twin Angel partner. Despite her antisocial nature and lack of desire to become a Twin Angel, she eventually grows into the role and becomes good friends with Meguri. Sumire is extremely fond of her brother and has a great deal of hunger (carrying six lunch boxes) due to low blood pressure. Sumire is also a member of the kendo club.
Miruku-chan (みるくちゃん)
Voiced by: Rie Kugimiya
She actually is Kurumi from the original series magically transformed to a hedgehog. She requests help from Meguri and Sumire to become Twin Angels while the original team, Haruka and Aoi, are captured in suspended animation.

== Media ==
=== Original video anime ===
==== Episode list ====
No.	Title	Original release date
1	TBA	September 18, 2008
Haruka and Aoi strive to protect a pair of statues being exhibited at the school festival. However, when the villain, a magician known as the Baron of the Fourth Dimension attacks, he reveals his main purpose is not the statues, but to crush the bonds of the Twin Angel. He succeeds by managing to hospitalise Aoi and destroy both of their 'Poketen' transformation devices, leaving Haruka devastated.
2	TBA	October 2, 2008
As Aoi remains hospitalized, Haruka feels guilty about running away during their battle with the Baron. However, after some encouragement from mysterious ally, Misty Knight, and her hardworking classmates, Haruka returns to Aoi's side as she wakes up and they rekindle their courage. Whilst Aoi rests, Haruka goes alone to confront the Baron, managing to transform without her Poketen, and is later aided by Misty Knight and Aoi, working together to defeat the Baron.

=== Anime television series ===
In December 2010, a promotional video at Sammy's Comic Market booth announced that a new anime television series was planned for 2011 with the J.C.Staff producing the animation. Titled Kaitō Tenshi Twin Angel: Kyun Kyun Tokimeki Paradise!! (快盗天使ツインエンジェル ~キュンキュン☆ときめきパラダイス!!~, Kaitō Tenshi Tsuin Enjeru: Kyun Kyun Tokimeki Paradaisu!!), the series began its broadcast run in Japan on TV Kanagawa on July 5, 2011, at 1:45am. The North American media website Crunchyroll simulcast the series under the title Twin Angel: Twinkle Paradise. The anime series has two pieces of theme music. The opening theme is "Those Girls are Totally Angels!!" (オンナのコって♪マジ☆超えんじぇる!!, Onna no Kotte Maji Chō Enjeru!!) performed by Ave;new Project feat. Saori Sakura and Rie Shirasawa and the ending theme is "Shining☆Star" performed by Yukari Tamura, Mamiko Noto and Rie Kugimiya, the voices of Haruka Minazuki, Aoi Kannazuki and Kurumi Hazuki, respectively. A new TV anime has been announced titled Twin Angel BREAK, serving as the sequel to Twinkle Paradise, premiered on April 7, 2017. The opening theme of Twin Angel BREAK is "Love♡Jewelry♪Angel☆Break!!" (ラブって♡ジュエリー♪えんじぇる☆ブレイク!!") performed by Ave;new Project feat. Mao Ichimichi and Ai Kayano, the voices of Meguru Amatsuki and Sumire Kisaragi. The ending theme is "Break Kurumi Milk Club!" performed by Rie Kugimiya. Crunchyroll later streamed the anime series.

=== Kaitou Tenshi Twin Angel: Kyun Kyun Tokimeki Paradise ===
==== Episode list ====
No.	Title	Original release date
1	"That Does Not Even Deserve a Response! Enter: Twin Angel"; Transliteration: "Mondō Muyō! Tsuin Enjeru Tōjō" (Japanese: 問答無用! ツインエンジェル登場)	July 5, 2011
Twin Angels spend their time protecting their town from crime when Salome attacks their school using a giant robot and attempts to steal a magical tiara.
2	"Beware of Thieves! Stolen Poketen"; Transliteration: "Tōnan Chūi! Ubawareta Poketen" (Japanese: 盗難注意! うばわれたポケてん)	July 12, 2011
Reeling from her defeat Salome attacks again this time by using a perverted burglar who bears a close resemblance to Yuito, which causes Haruka to doubt him. Using this camouflage Salome steals the girls poketens preventing them from transforming.
3	"The Triumphant Debut of Hazuki Kurumi!"; Transliteration: "Iki Yōyō! Hazuki Kurumi Kenzan" (Japanese: 意気揚々! 葉月クルミ見参)	July 19, 2011
Kurumi Hazuki the White Angel and Aoi's cousin arrives to assist Twin Angel and immediately begins antagonizing Haruka who she feels is inadequate as Aoi's partner.
4	"Sizzling Hot Photos! The Target is Twin Angel!"; Transliteration: "Gekisatsu Gekisha! Hyōteki wa Tsuin'enjeru" (Japanese: 激撮激写! 標的はツインエンジェル)	July 26, 2011
Yayoi Shinmon the school's amoral reporter attempts to uncover the true identity of the Twin Angel girls.
5	"Passionate Love Warning! Senjou-sensei's Part-time Job"; Transliteration: "Netsuai Keihō! Saijō-sensei no Arubaito" (Japanese: 熱愛警報! 西条先生のアルバイト)	August 2, 2011
Looking for part-time work Ms. Saijo the school teacher is recruited as Black Carrier by Black Trader whom she falls in love with mistaking his distant demeanor as a kindred lonely heart.
6	"Hot, Passionate Wind! Angel Hurricane"; Transliteration: "Jōnetsu Neppū! Enjeru Harikēn" (Japanese: 情熱熱風! エンジェルハリケーン)	August 9, 2011
Fed-up with each other Haruka and Kurumi refuse to work together forcing Aoi to seek Misty Knight's assistance in reconciling the two. Unfortunately, he is trapped inside a bear costume from his part-time day job forcing him to improvise.
7	"Identity Unknown! Is Nyan's UMA a Good UMA!?"; Transliteration: "Shōtai Fumei! Musume (nyan) no UMA wa Yoi UMA!?" (Japanese: 正体不明! 娘(ニャン)のUMAは良いUMA!?)	August 16, 2011
The three girls discover that their classmate Nyan Tomochi is secretly caring for a colossal Japanese Giant Salamander.
8	"The Path of Duty! Twin Sisters"; Transliteration: "Ebisu ken ichi-setsu (Iken Issetsu)! Futago no Shimai" (Japanese: 夷険一節(いけんいっせつ)! 双子の姉妹)	August 23, 2011
While at the beach the girls meet and make friends with Tesla and Nine Violet the Twin Phantom daughters of Black Trader and their future enemies.
9	"Formidable Appearance! The Identity of Twin Phantom"; Transliteration: "Kyōteki Shutsugen! Tsuin Fantomu no Shōtai" (Japanese: 強敵出現! ツインファントムの正体)	August 30, 2011
On the day of the school's festival, Black Carrier and Twin Phantom attempt to steal part of the Seven Amulets protected by the school the latter two revealing themselves as enemies to the Twin Angel girls.
10	"In One Stroke! One Rose Burning in the Darkness"; Transliteration: "Ikkikasei! Yami ni Moeru Bara Ichi-rin" (Japanese: 一気呵成! 闇に燃えるバラ一輪)	September 6, 2011
Twin Phantom attacks a second time but decide that fighting their friends is wrong and back down. Salome and Alexander join the heroes after being betrayed by Black Trader. However Misty Knight sacrifices himself to stop a time bomb from leveling the school and surrounding area.
11	"Driven into a Corner!! The Wish of Each One"; Transliteration: "Zettaizetsumei! Sorezore no Omoi" (Japanese: 絶体絶命! それぞれの想い)	September 13, 2011
Rocked by the death of Misty Knight, Haruka wallows in depression while Twin Phantom attempt to stop Black Trader.
12	"The Final Battle! Let's Get Everyone's Smiles Back"; Transliteration: "Saishū Kessen! Min'na no Egao o Torimodosu!" (Japanese: 最終決戦! みんなの笑顔を取り戻す!)	September 20, 2011
Black Trader attempts to use the combined Seven Amulets to power a satellite weapon with the power to destroy the world. Twin Angels with help from a recently returned Misty Knight and Salome attempt to stop him.
