= List of Twelve Kingdoms characters =

This is a list of characters in the novel series The Twelve Kingdoms and its anime adaptation.

== Kingdom of Kei inhabitants ==
The following characters reside in the Kingdom of Kei:

=== Youko Nakajima ===
Voiced by: Aya Hisakawa (Japanese); Dorothy Elias-Fahn (English)

Youko Nakajima (中嶋 陽子, Nakajima Yōko) is a sixteen-year-old honors student in Japan who lives an ordinary life. Her primary worries are her naturally red hair (it was speculated by some students and a teacher that Youko might've dyed her hair red) and an inexplicable recurring dream that haunts her. When a man named Keiki suddenly appears at her school, he bows at her feet, swearing loyalty to her and offering protection. The school is attacked by a giant bird and she reluctantly accepts his oath. He gives her a sword and transports her across the Void Sea to the Twelve Kingdoms, where she ends up in the Kingdom of Kou.

Youko is initially confused by the changes that have been brought onto her including a complete change in her appearance that she cannot see herself and being stranded in an unknown land with no means of returning home. These changes cause her to cry constantly, lapse into a state of helplessness, and complain about interfering in other beings' lives no matter what the situation. As she searches for Keiki, she finds herself constantly battling against Youma and being betrayed by civilians of Kou many times. While Youko becomes wary of trusting others, she eventually comes to befriend and trust a hanjyu named Rakushun. They escape to the Kingdom of En where Youko learns that she is the heiress to the throne of the kingdom of Kei. Although she is initially reluctant, Youko accepts the position through her growth in the story. In a later story arc as the newly appointed queen, Youko learns of several problems in her kingdom including a revolt in the Province of Wa. Subsequently, she is pulled into the search for Taiki when the Tai general Risai beseeches Youko's help in finding him.

As the ruler of Kei, she is given the regnal name of Sekishi (赤子, Red Child), because of her bright red hair and because her councillors initially view her as a child. Despite being a weak character to begin with, appearing very withdrawn and not wanting to do anything that would bring attention to herself, Youko grows in strength and maturity, becomes empathetic towards the people around her, thinking articulately about her actions (especially as queen) and continues to do so until the end of the series.

=== Aozaru ===
Voiced by: Kousuke Okano (Japanese); Richard Cansino (English)

Aozaru (蒼猿, blue monkey) is the physical manifestation of the sentient spirit of the scabbard of the Suigūtō (水禺刀, the Water Monkey Sword). The sword is a royal treasure to the kingdom of Kei and can only be wielded by the kingdom's rightful ruler – as such, Youko is the only one who can draw the sword from its sheath. The sword was forged from a water demon that a previous great ruler of Kei had defeated while the scabbard was created from a long-tailed monkey demon. From the scabbard hangs a large jewel that can heal the one who holds it.

The sword is not only capable of killing demons and sages and breaking substances like metal chains, but is also capable of presenting visions of the past, future, and things in the distance. The sword and scabbard must be kept together, otherwise the phantasms of the sword appear unchecked while the spirit of the scabbard is free to act as it wishes. When Youko loses the scabbard during an attack by Kikis, it appears in the form of Aozaru, the blue monkey, and taunts her with her doubts while the sword presents her with visions of things she does not wish to see. Eventually, Youko, overcoming her own doubts, kills the monkey and picks up the dead scabbard. Because she has killed Aozaru, the sword can be drawn from the sheath by anyone, though it can be wielded effectively only by Youko.

=== Seikyou ===
Voiced by: Seiji Sasaki (Japanese); Kirk Thornton (English)

Seikyou (靖共, Seikyō) has long served as the Chosai, the top administrator, of Kei. Seikyou works to convince Youko that Koukan, the leader of the province of Baku, is a threat to her. After an assassin plots to kill Youko, Seikyou advises Youko that Koukan planned it and that she should execute him, but Keiki advises her to listen to Koukan before acting. When Youko orders Koukan to report, Seikyou has him attacked, forcing him to flee. Seikyou continually seeks to confuse Youko, telling her that Gahou is corrupt but advising that no action be taken against him, even though Seikyou secretly supports Gahou. He repeatedly seeks meetings with her when Keiki is not present so that the kirin cannot advise her. Youko, citing Seikyou's attempts to manipulate her and his failure to better safeguard her life, demotes Seikyou and appoints Keiki as chosai. When Youko leaves to study with Enho, Seikyou takes advantage of the situation to usurp Keiki's authority. When the rebels become a threat to Gahou, Seikyou sends a royal army force under general Jinrai to Shisui to scare the rebels into surrendering, unaware of Youko's presence in Wa because she told everyone in the court except Keiki that she was going to En. Seikyou's plan fails because Youko appears to take control of the royal forces and she redirects them against Gahou. After Shoukei convinces Youko that Seikyou is the mastermind behind the plot, Youko has him arrested.

=== Ei Province inhabitants ===
The following characters reside in the Kingdom of Kei's capital called the Ei Province:

==== Keiki ====
Voiced by: Takehito Koyasu (Japanese); Kim Strauss (English)

Keiki (景麒) is a Kirin and the Saiho of Kei. Like all Kirin, Keiki abhors violence and prefers peaceful resolutions. Keiki appears as a very quiet and unemotional type, however does have caring qualities, especially seen towards the Kirin Taiki. In spite of being gruff and somewhat unapproachable, he is actually very sincere and loyal to Youko.

Before meeting Youko, Keiki had taken a long time before selecting Youko's immediate predecessor, Joukaku (舒覚), to become the ruler of Kei, but she was an ineffective ruler and fell in love with Keiki; her jealousy resulted in irrational acts including expelling all the women from the country and executing those who remained. Keiki contracted Shitsudou and in order to save his life, Joukaku abdicated her throne and killed herself after a short reign of six years and was posthumously known as Yo-ou (予王, the Prophet). Cured of his illness, Keiki set out immediately to find a new monarch for Kei.

He eventually finds Youko Nakajima, who had been living as a taika in Japan without any knowledge of the Twelve Kingdoms, and forcibly brings her back to the Twelve Kingdoms. They are separated on arrival and Keiki is captured and enchanted by Kourin, the kirin of Kou, so that he is unable to speak, summon his Shirei, or return to human form. Forced to appear before Joyei (舒栄), Joukaku's sister and pretender to the throne of Kei, Keiki remains a prisoner of the false ruler until Youko, aided by the King of En, rescues him and frees him from his enchantment. After liberating Kei, Keiki continues to advise Youko on statecraft and politics.

==== Enho ====
Voiced by: Tomomichi Nishimura (Japanese); Michael McConnohie (English)

Enho (遠甫) is a wise man who lives in the city of Hokui in the province of Ei, where Keiki is the provincial leader. When Youko decides that she knows too little about her kingdom to rule wisely, Keiki sends her to Enho to study. Among the citizens of Kei, only Youko, Keiki, and Enho know of this arrangement. When she arrives, Enho's Rike is under attack by youma, and she acts to save Enho and the rike's other residents, but only Enho, a girl named Rangyoku, and her brother Keikei survive. When Youko leaves to visit Takuhou and Meikaku, the rike is attacked by Shoukou's men; Rangyoku is killed, Keikei is injured, and Enho is abducted and taken to Gahou. Youko moves to rescue Enho and learns from Suzu that Shoukou has taken Enho. When she captures Shoukou, he reveals that Enho is held by Gahou. Enho is rescued when Youko sends the royal army to attack Gahou and she appoints him as her Taishi, one of her chief advisors responsible for educating her on matters of state.

Enho is known by a number of aliases; his true name is actually Etsu Otsu (乙悦, Otsu Etsu). Under the name Shouhaku (松伯, Shōhaku), Enho was known as a legendary higher sage who served Tatsu (達王, Tatsu-ou), a great and beloved Emperor of Kei, and was responsible for sealing Aozaru into the Suigūtō's sheath. During this time, he was also known as Roushou (老松, Rōshō).

=== Wa Province inhabitants ===
The following characters reside in the Kingdom of Kou's Wa Province:

==== Shoukou ====
Voiced by: Toru Ohkawa (Japanese); Tom Wyner (English)

Shoukou (昇紘, Shōkō) is the governor of the Shisui Prefecture in the Wa Province of Kei. His corruption is so great and the taxes he demands are so high that he threatens the fragile stability of Youko's rule as the new Queen of Kei. When Shoukou's carriage runs over the blind boy Seishuu, Suzu convinces a resistance movement led by Koshou and Sekki that the time has come to rebel against Shoukou. Youko joins with the rebels when she discovers that Shoukou is responsible for abducting her mentor Enho. In the anime, Shoukou enlists the aid of the half-crazed Asano and appears slim, confident, and defiant of the Heavens' will, but during his sword fight with Youko, when he realizes that he is fighting the ruler of Kei, he gives up.

In the novel, when Youko finds Shoukou, she discovers that he is immensely fat and he is futilely trying to hide from her.

In both media, Suzu insists that Shoukou be killed, but Youko refuses to allow anyone to kill Shoukou since she needs to question him about who has been allowing him to get away with his crimes.

==== Gahou ====
Voiced by: Kazuhiro Nakada (Japanese); Dave Mallow (English)

Gahou (呀峰) is the corrupt leader of the Wa province of Kei. Gahou orders Shoukou to kidnap Youko's mentor Enho because he believes that Enho's idealism is a threat to him. Shoukei swears to depose him after she witnesses a crucifixion Gahou ordered, leading to her joining a resistance movement led by Kantai. When Shoukou is captured, because Gahou fears that his lackey will reveal damaging information that will lead to his dismissal, Gahou sends a military force to wipe out both the Shisui rebels and Shoukou, a plan foiled by Kantai's timely parallel effort to relieve the rebels with his own force. When Youko takes control of a royal army force sent by Seikyou and led by general Jinrai, she sends the force to arrest Gahou and free Enho.

==== Koshou ====
Voiced by: Rintaro Nishi (Japanese); Jamieson Price (English)

Koshou (虎嘯) is the charismatic leader of the Shisui rebels. He rallies the rebels to fight against Shoukou, even though he believes that they cannot win. When Youko declares that Shoukou must be spared, Koshou supports her. When the town of Takuhou, the capital of Shisui, is set on fire, Koshou insists that the people must be rescued or else the rebellion has no point, even though the fire is a trap for his fighters. When Youko asks him what he wants as a reward for his service, he asks her to procure a university spot for his brother Sekki.

==== Sekki ====
Voiced by: Kenji Nojima (Japanese); Yuri Lowenthal (English)

Sekki (夕暉), the brother of Koshou, is the brains behind the Shisui rebels. When Youko appears searching for Enho, Koshou is about to attack her because he believes she is a spy who is going to give them away, but Sekki stops him. He later explains that he heard the ring of steel, and that Youko's bravery suggests that she is far more dangerous than she appears. Sekki makes all the tactical decisions for the rebels except when fire threatened Takuhou and Koshou overrides him.

=== Baku Province inhabitants ===
The following characters reside in the Kingdom of Kou's Baku Province:

==== Kantai ====
Voiced by: Yasunori Matsumoto (Japanese); Paul St. Peter (English)

Kantai (桓魋) is actually Seishin (青辛), the general of the province of Baku. He is a Hanjyuu that can take the form of a large bear and he is incredibly strong even in human form. He saves Shoukei after she ran from the soldiers who sought to arrest her after she threw a rock at Gahou's executioners. Kantai seeks to expose the corruption of Gahou, and he sends Shoukei to the intermediate village of Houkaku to provide touki weapons to the Shisui rebels. Suzu arrives there to take the weapons to Takuhou. When Kantai realizes that his allies in Shisui will be wiped out by Gahou, he sends his own forces to intervene. Shoukei accompanies him and seeks out Suzu to inform the Shisui rebels that Kantai is on their side. When Koushou insists on saving Takuhou from fire, Kantai is shamed into helping him despite his doubts. When Youko asks Kantai what reward he wants for fighting corruption, Kantai asks for pardon for his lord Koukan. After Gahou is defeated, Youko places Kantai in charge of Kei's entire army.

==== Koukan ====
Voiced by: Kenji Nomura (Japanese); Terrence Stone (English)

Koukan (浩瀚) is the leader of the province of Baku. Of all the provincial lords, only Koukan opposed the false queen Joyei. Seikyou advises Youko that Koukan will oppose her as well and when a trusted advisor attempts to kill Youko, Seikyou argues that Koukan is behind the plot. Youko suspects Koukan, but she does not act on her suspicions due to the advice of Keiki, who argues that Koukan is not the sort of man who would come up with such a scheme. When she orders Koukan to appear and explain himself, he is attacked and forced to flee and go into hiding. Youko eventually learns that not only has Koukan been falsely accused, but he has taken the initiative to try to stamp out corruption in the Wa Province by sending his top general Kantai to the Wa capital of Meikaku. She rewards him for his efforts by promoting him to chosai, the chief administrator of her court.

== Kingdom of En inhabitants ==
The following characters reside in the Kingdom of En:

=== Shoryu ===
Voiced by: Masaki Aizawa (Japanese); Lex Lang (English)

Shoryu (尚隆, Shōryū) is the King of En, once known by the Japanese name of Naotaka Saburou Komatsu (小松三郎尚隆, Komatsu Saburou Naotaka). Like Youko, Shoryu is a Taika. He has ruled En for approximately five hundred years and is considered a genius of administration, but Shoryu believes that all kings have the potential to be great and that he is by no means exceptional as a human being. He possesses an easy-going attitude and tends to go off on his own, much to the consternation of his advisors, but highly perceptive and cunning.

Originally the young master of the Komatsu clan during feudal Japan, his clan was wiped out shortly after he was found by Enki. He accepts Enki's request to become the King of En in the Twelve Kingdoms, remarking that a king can only be a king if he has people to lead. As king, he comes to be known as Shoryu, the Chinese pronunciation of the characters for his given name, Naotaka. When he ascends the throne, the Kingdom of En is in a terrible state; during his five hundred year rule, he has led the country to a state of extreme calm and prosperity.

He initially appears to Youko and Rakushun as Fuukan (風漢) and offers both protection and support to Youko as the new Queen of Kei. As such, Shoryu provides her with an army to rescue Keiki and retake the Kingdom of Kei. As a fellow taika, Shoryu feels that he should help guide Youko in her new life and proves to be one of her strongest supporters as she becomes the new ruler of Kei.

=== Enki ===
Voiced by: Kappei Yamaguchi (Japanese); Dave Wittenberg (English)

As a taika from Japan, Enki (延麒) is also known as Rokuta (六太). Born during a time of civil war in Japan, the Kirin of En was abandoned by his parents at a very young age and had been starving to death until his Nyokai found him. Because he matured at a younger age, Enki appears as a young boy compared to other kirin like Keiki. He and Shoryu share a good relationship and are able to treat one another in a casual manner.

As a result of his past, Enki possessed a strong aversion to kings, seeing them as warmongers and the ones responsible for destroying a country. Originally feeling that humans could not rule a kingdom properly, Enki was reluctant to choose a new king. Invoking a Meishoku, he returned to Japan and met Naotaka Komatsu, the son of a seafaring king and a taika from the Twelve Kingdoms. Though he did not have any faith in kings, he realizes that Naotaka is the king of En and Rokuta accepts him as his master. The pair return to the Twelve Kingdoms and Naotaka takes the throne as "Shoryu". Their trust in one another is strengthened when the King of En is forced to suppress a rebellion in his kingdom.

When the kingdom of En chooses to aid Youko to rescue Keiki and free the kingdom of Kei from its false queen, Enki and Rakushun travel through various provinces in Kei to persuade the governors to abandon the imposter. Because he periodically travels to Hourai, Enki is also responsible for finding the kirin of Tai and helping him come to terms as a kirin.

=== Kouya ===
Young Kouya Voiced by: Emi Motoi (Japanese); Megan Hollingshead (English)
Adult Kouya Voiced by: Akira Ishida (Japanese); Scott Page-Pagter (English)

Kouya (更夜) is a young boy who was abandoned by his impoverished mother when he was young, Kouya was raised by a youma he called Ōkii-no (big one), who called Kouya Chiisai-no (little one). He met Rokuta when they are young and revealed his wish to travel to Hourai, believing that it is a peaceful land and hoping to find his mother. Rokuta named his new friend Kouya, meaning midnight as they had met at midnight. Not wishing to forget his new name, particularly since he had forgotten the name his mother had given him, Kouya asked that Ōkii-no call him Kouya and began to call Ōkii-no Rokuta in order to remember his new friend.

Kouya eventually encountered Atsuyu, the governor of En's Gen Province, and was greeted with apparent kindness. In exchange for Kouya's loyalty, Atsuyu provided Kouya with a place to live and a formal education. As a result, Kouya becomes involved with Atsuyu's attempt to overthrow Shoryu, the King of En, twenty years into the king's reign. During this time, Kouya develops into a sadistic person with no regard to human life – regularly letting his demon bird devour prisoners, soldiers, as well as female servants who have offended him. When Atsuyu is defeated, Kouya leaves En without punishment, and becomes known as Kenroushin-kun (犬狼真君, Kenrōshin-kun), a heavenly sage tasked with guarding and protecting the people who travel the Yellow Sea. Since then, he has waited for Shoryu fulfill his promise to create a place where Kouya and Ōkii-no can live in peace.

== Kingdom of Kou inhabitants ==
The following characters reside in the Kingdom of Kou:

=== King of Kou ===
Voiced by: Takaya Hashi (Japanese); Bob Papenbrook (English)

The former king of Kou (塙王), known also as Chou (張), has ruled his country for fifty years and has tried his best to improve the state of Kou, but feels that he will never be able to bring Kou the prosperity seen by the neighbouring kingdoms of Sou and En, whose rulers have ruled for six hundred and five hundred years respectively. When Joukaku (舒覚), the ruler of Kei, dies after a reign of six years, the King of Kou comes to fear Youko's ascension to the throne of Kei, believing that as a taika like the King of En, she will be able to bring the ruined country the same prosperity as En and Kou will continue to fall behind.

As such, the King of Kou secretly supports the false queen Joyei (舒栄), the younger sister of Joukaku who seized the throne without being chosen by Keiki, and makes various efforts to capture and kill Youko. In the anime, these efforts include manipulating Yuka Sugimoto so that Youko will be unable to attain the throne of Kei.

After his eventual death as a result of Kourin sacrificing herself, the King of Kou is posthumously known as Saku-ou (錯王, the Foolish King, the Wrong King).

=== Kourin ===
Voiced by: Yuko Sasaki (Japanese); Wendee Lee (English)

Kourin (塙麟) is the Kirin of Kou. She attempts to dissuade the King of Kou from attacking Youko and from losing faith in his own ability as a ruler by constantly comparing himself to the Kings of En and Sou. As a kirin, she is bound to obey his orders, regardless of her willingness to do so; under his orders, she reluctantly captures Keiki when he tries to bring Youko to the Twelve Kingdoms and orders her shirei and the demons they command to pursue and attack Youko. In the anime, she sacrifices herself to stop the King of Kou from attacking Youko. With the death of his kirin, the King of Kou will die within a year.

=== Rakushun ===
Voiced by: Kenichi Suzumura (Japanese); Peter Doyle (English)

Rakushun (楽俊) is a Hanjyuu with the form of a twenty-two-year-old mouse who is a citizen of the Kingdom of Kou. Rakushun is proud of being a hanjyuu and is somewhat uncomfortable in his human form; Youko only learns that he could appear as a human after quite some time. Though Youko is initially distrustful of him, he becomes her first good friend in the Twelve Kingdoms. He is very intelligent and knowledgeable, teaching Youko essential skills on how to live in the Twelve Kingdoms as well as politics and customs. He travels with Youko from Kou to En in hopes of being able to further his education since hanjyu are prohibited from higher levels of education in Kou. Rakushun eventually deduces that Youko is the rightful ruler of the Kingdom of Kei based on the unusual circumstances that have surrounded her since coming to his world; upon this discovery, he reassures Youko that he has faith in her and wishes to see what sort of country she will build when she doubts her ability to become Kei's new monarch.

After Youko ascends the throne of Kei, Rakushun remains in En and enrolls in the country's Daigaku. During his tenure at school, Enki sends Rakushun to Ryuu to investigate why Youma are appearing there. While there, Rakushun meets Shoukei, who attempts to shift blame to him for stealing items from the palace at Kyou. The court does not believe her story and knows that she is the thief, but it nevertheless accepts the items as a bribe and allows her to go. Ironically, Shoukei's double-cross allows Rakushun to complete his mission since the corrupt nature of the court shows that Ryuu is in decline.

== Kingdom of Hou inhabitants ==
The following characters reside in the Kingdom of Hou:

=== Chuutatsu ===
Voiced by: Kan Tokumaru (Japanese); Michael Forest (English)

Chuutatsu (仲韃) was the reigning king of Hou. He had his kingdom as an overly strict law enforcement. When his laws did not improve the lives of his people, the king mistakenly believed that even harsher laws were required and continued to enact increasingly harsher laws each time his laws failed. This resulted in 600,000 of his people being executed. He was later killed by Gekkei.

=== Shoukei ===
Voiced by: Houko Kuwashima (Japanese); Kate Higgins (English)

Shoukei (祥瓊, Shōkei) was the sheltered princess of Hou, until her father Chuutatsu's government was overthrown due to his overly strict enforcement of the law. Three hundred thousand of his people were executed during his reign. When her father is assassinated, her mother and the Kirin of Hou are killed before her; Shoukei is spared because she had been unaware of her father's actions. Her name is removed from the register of Immortals and she is stripped of her royal name; as a commoner, Shoukei can only use her given name, Sonshou (孫昭, Sonshō). Revoked of her status as a member of Hou's royal family, Shoukei is forced to live anonymously as a peasant without any luxuries and is displeased with the drastic changes in her life. To comfort herself, she enjoys singing a song about a doll from her time as the Princess of Hou, until she decides that she was nothing more than a doll herself when she was a princess. She becomes jealous of Youko, the new Queen of Kei, whose rise in status coincides with Shoukei's own fall in fortunes.

Shoukei is eventually forced to flee from Hou when her identity as the former Princess of Hou is discovered by impoverished townspeople who have been angry about her father's cruel deeds during his reign, and they try to execute her themselves. She briefly serves the queen of Kyou, Shushou, but she is treated very severely if not downright cruelly, because the queen believed her to be too proud. She decides to steal clothes and jewellery from the palace and escapes to Ryu, where she meets Rakushun. When captured by Ryu government officials, Shoukei tries in vain to blame Rakushun for her crimes before attempting to bribe her way out of trouble. Shoukei gradually overcomes her jealousy of Youko, realizing that Youko must be something special to be friends with a forgiving hanjyuu like Rakushun.

Shoukei leaves for Kei, but upon her arrival, she witnesses a man condemned to be crucified in the Wa Province. Reminded of her father's own brutality, she throws a rock at the executioners to stop them from killing the poor man and is chased by guards until she is saved by a young woman named Youshi, who tells her that the man will be all right thanks to her. Initially unaware that her rescuer is Youko, Shoukei decides to find the Queen of Kei in order to warn her about the coming rebellion and, like Suzu, joins rebels revolting against Shoukou, the corrupt governor of Wa. Following the establishment of Youko's rule of Kei, Shoukei becomes a courtier in Youko's court and serves as a royal scribe.

=== Gekkei ===
Voiced by: Masahiko Tanaka (Japanese); Michael McConnohie (English)

Gekkei (月渓) is the governor of Kei Province in Hou. He leads the rebellion against Chuutatsu and willingly commits regicide, believing that the sin of killing the king and the kirin are better than allowing the king to continuing executing lives for trivial offenses. Gekkei reveals that while Chuutatsu had been far too harsh in his rule, Gekkei knew that the austere king's expectations of others had been overextended. When his laws did not improve the lives of his people, the king mistakenly believed that even harsher laws were required and continued to enact increasingly harsher laws each time his laws failed. Gekkei led his uprising because he had become aware it was too late to restore him to the rightful path and there was no longer anyone willing to stop the king, who had become fanatic in trying to ensure his people were righteous.

After executing the king, the kirin, and the queen, Gekkei spares Shoukei's life, in spite of the deep resentment and loathing the populace holds over her for not stopping her father. After removing her from the divine registry, he places Shoukei in village under an alias until her identity is revealed after three years. When he rescues her, he sees that she still has not realized her faults and coldly sends her to the kingdom of Kyou to prevent further chaos in Hou, but worries about Shoukei's welfare after she is exiled from Hou, particularly after hearing she has fled from Kyou after stealing from the queen of Kyou.

Despite leading the insurrection against the king, Gekkei refuses to lead the provisional government to maintain order in Hou until a new monarch is chosen, even with tacit support from the queen of Kyou. Instead, he retreats to the Kei Province to continue his duties as his governor, believing that leading the provisional government would equate him to becoming an usurper. He reluctantly accepts the responsibility after learning Shoukei's fate and how she has changed and learned to accept responsibility for her actions.

=== Kaka ===
Voiced by: Rumi Ochiai (Japanese); Jessica Stenuis (English)

Kaka (佳花) was the previous Royal Consort of Hou as the wife of Chuutatsu, and mother of Shoukei. She was later killed by Gekkei.

=== Hourin ===
Voiced by: Miyuki Matsushita

Hourin (峯麟) was the kirin of the kingdom of Hou. She was later killed by Gekkei.

== Kingdom of Sai inhabitants ==
The following characters reside in the Kingdom of Sai:

=== Suzu ===
Voiced by: Naomi Wakabayashi (Japanese); Mela Lee (English)

Suzu (大木 鈴, Ōki Suzu) was born to a poor farmer's family in Meiji era Japan. She is swept into the Twelve Kingdoms by a shoku after falling off a cliff when she was sold to pay off her family's debt. As a Kaikyaku, she is unable to communicate with anyone and soon falls into despair. In the anime, she is first seen in an encounter with Taiki, whom she wishes to meet because he also grew up in Hourai, but she is injured and forced away from him by his protective Nyokai. Suzu winds up travelling with travelling performers until they encounter a Sen-nin known as Riyo (梨耀), who is the first person Suzu meets who is able to understand her.

Riyo agrees to take Suzu when she returns to the mountains and grants Suzu the status of a sen-nin so she may understand the language of the Twelve Kingdoms. Suzu serves Riyo for one hundred years, but is forced to endure a great deal of abuse from Riyo, who reveals herself to be a cruel mistress who especially delights in abusing Suzu as she lacked the will to fight back. Shortly after Riyo attempts to torture Suzu with news of the new Queen of Kei, whose background was similar to Suzu's own, Suzu escapes and briefly finds shelter with the kindly queen of Sai. She eventually leaves for Kei in order to search for Youko, believing that she can rescue Suzu from difficult life, and befriends a boy named Seishuu, who has failing eyesight. When Seishuu is killed by Shoukou, the corrupt governor of Kei's Wa province, Suzu joins a revolutionary group dedicated to his downfall. Joined by a young woman named Youshi Chuu (中 陽子, Chū Yōshi), Suzu additionally seeks to assassinate the Queen of Kei, as all evidence indicates that the queen has done nothing to stop Shoukou, and is initially unaware that Youshi is actually Youko in disguise. She and Shoukei eventually befriend Youko and learn her identity as Kei's monarch. After Youko ends the revolt, Suzu is brought to Youko's court to become one of her ladies-in-waiting.

=== Kouko ===
Voiced by: Reiki Suzuki

Chuu Kin (中瑾, Chū Kin) is the current Queen of Sai, who has ruled the country for twenty years alongside her Kirin, Sairin. Known for her compassion and great character, she is known by the regnal name of Kouko (黄姑, "the golden mother-in-law"), in recognition of her status as the previous king's aunt and adopted mother. Her informal given name is Shinshi (槙思)

Prior to becoming the ruler of Sai, Kouko had served as the Taifu, one of the three advisors of Shishou, her nephew and immediate predecessor as king. Kouko's son, Eishuku, served as Shishou's prime minister and she was the foster-mother to Eishuku's page, Seiki. Shishou's eventual downfall and abdication of the throne resulted in the loss of most of Kouko's family, after which she was chosen to the kirin to become Sai's new monarch. During her reign, she has expressed great wisdom and resolve.

When Suzu flees from Riyou, the Mistress of Suibi Cavern, Kouko and Sairin give Suzu sanctuary in the royal Choukan Palace. While Kouko promises that Suzu will not be removed from the Divine Registry, she does not allow Suzu to join the servants taken from Riyou's aerie to work in Choukan Palace. Because she believes that Suzu must learn to understand how others are feeling rather making assumptions and becoming disappointed when the person does not live up to her expectations, Kouko sends Suzu away to try and see more of the world. While she is somewhat disappointed that Suzu insists on going to Kei believing that the ruler of Kei will understand her better than Kouko or Sairin, Kouko provides Suzu with a travel pass and funds, in hopes that Suzu will learn from her experiences.

=== Sairin ===
Voiced by: Ruri Asano (Japanese); Jessica Stenius (English)

Sairin (采麟) is the current Kirin of Sai. Because she is well-known and beloved in Sai for possessing a kind heart and gentle nature, she was given the name Youran (揺籃, Yōran, "cradle").

Before selecting Kouko as the monarch of Sai, Sairin had chosen a king known as Shishou (砥尚, Shishō), who climbed Mount Hou after the death of the king who preceded him. At the beginning of his reign, he presented Sairin with the royal treasure of Sai, a jewelled branch called the kashokada (華胥華朶), as a promise to rule his country well and bring about prosperity, but during his twenty-year reign, his actions caused Sairin to contract shitsudou. Realizing he had lost the way, Shishou ascended Mount Hou to abdicate the throne and took his life. Sairin chose Kouko as the next king and continues to always carry a branch with leaves on it, as a memento of the broken promise Shishou had made to her that he would govern his country well.

== Kingdom of Tai inhabitants ==
The following characters reside in the Kingdom of Tai:

=== Taiki ===
Taiki Voiced by: Rie Kugimiya (Japanese); Terry Sutton (English)
Takasato Voiced by: Kousuke Okano (Japanese); Johnny Yong Bosch (English)

Taiki (泰麒) is the Kirin of Tai, though is not fully mature and is actually a heina (an immature Kirin), and Koki (a rare black Kirin). Like Youko, Shouryuu, and Enki, he is a taika from Hourai; as a result, he is known by the name Kaname Takasato (高里要, Takasato Kaname). His nickname, Kouri (蒿里), derived from an alternate pronunciation of "Takasato" and was given to him by Gyousou after Taiki chose him as the new King of Tai. After many years in Hourai, Taiki is eventually taken back to the Twelve Kingdoms in order to fulfill his role as the kirin of Tai, but when the kingdom of Tai falls, both the King of Tai and Taiki go missing.

Fifteen years before Youko Nakajima's arrival in the Twelve Kingdoms, Taiki's ranka had been blown over to Hourai by a shoku. He is returned to Mount Hou ten years after his disappearance, after being found by Enki. Taiki is cared for and educated in his role as the kirin of Tai by his nyokai, Haku Sanshi (白汕子), but is initially unable to transform into his beast form because he had been in human form for so long. He eventually chooses Gyousou to become king; while Taiki is uncertain of his choice and initially terrified of Gyousou, he eventually realizes that his fear was recognition of the "aura of the ruler" required of the one chosen by the kirin to become a true king.

In addition to Haku Sanshi, Taiki also has a powerful toutetsu youma, Gouran, as his shirei. Before his disappearance, Taiki was close to Keiki and was called "half-pint" by Enki. After his disappearance, Taiki is eventually revealed to be alive in Japan and attends high school. In the anime, he is a student at Youko, Yuka, and Asano's school and appears repeatedly in volumes four and five of the anime and referred to at times. Due to the sudden stop of the anime, Taiki's story was never finished and leaves the unresolved situation in which Rokuta is still looking for him in Japan.

His story is continued in the novels. In A Shore in Twilight, one of Gyousou's men named Asen stages a coup d'état when he becomes dissatisfied with the king's aggressive reforms. Gyousou is lured away and Asen attacks Taiki, cutting of his horn just before Taiki flees to Hourai via a meishoku. The trauma causes Taiki to lose his memory of the year he spent in the Twelve Kingdoms and he remains in Japan for six years. During this time he begins to lose his kirin nature and is slowly poisoned by the meat he is fed by his family. Eventually Sanshi and Gouran start to go wild and begin killing everyone who gets close to Taiki, mistaking them for enemies: this causes his human family, which already distrusted him, to abhor him and pretty much wish for Takazato's death, believing him to be a living curse. The final breakdown comes when Sanshi and Gouran murder the abusive Takazatos when Taiki is away, showing that they have completely lost their nature as shirei and have become wild youma, as shown in Demon Child.

Taiki eventually remembers everything and is rescued by the combined efforts of Risai and the kings and kirins of the Twelve Kingdoms. Upon his return, he and his shirei are so full of impurity that the other kirin are unable to get close to him, so a goddess agrees to cleanse them of the impurity. Afterward, Taiki (now without his kirin powers or shirei due to the loss of his horn) reunites with Risai and they leave for Tai in an attempt to save the kingdom. In the novels, Taiki's story stops here and the fate of Tai is not known.

=== Gyousou ===
Voiced by: Keiji Fujiwara (Japanese); Chris Kent (English)

Gyousou Saku (乍 驍宗, Saku Gyōsō) is a famous general of Tai. After the death of the previous King of Tai, Gyousou ascended Mount Hou in hopes of becoming the new king. Though Taiki is terrified of Gyousou and unsure if he has chosen the right person to become the King of Tai, Taiki eventually realizes his fear of Gyousou was how he recognized Gyousou was to become king. Upon Gyousou's recognition as Tai's new king and his departure from Mount Hou, he chooses to present Taiki with the nickname Kouri as a sign of what he hopes will be a prosperous age for Tai.

Because of his predecessor's extravagance, Tai was nearly bankrupt and had fallen into a state of civil war. Gyousou reduced the royal palaces expenditures to a bare minimum. War continued to escalate in Tai and eventually both Taiki and Gyousou disappear and are thought to be dead. Though Taiki is eventually found to be alive in Hourai, Gyousou remains missing though is believed to be still alive.

=== Risai ===
Voiced by: Naomi Shindou (Japanese); Michelle Ruff (English)

Risai (李斎) is the general of Tai's Jou Province and well-known, though she is not as renowned as Gyousou. When Taiki's return to the Twelve Kingdoms is announced, she is among the many who ascend Mount Hou in hopes of being chosen as the new king. She is a sennin (sage) as a result of becoming a general of Jou since the governor of Jou, who has a lived a long life, requires those who serve him to also possess longevity as well to retain their usefulness. Taiki develops a friendly relationship with her, but in the end does not recognize her as Tai's new king. After Gyousou ascends the throne of Tai, she remains a loyal subject.

When Taiki and Gyousou both mysteriously vanish during another civil war, she and military commanders and civil servants oppose the governor who places himself in charge of the kingdom. While many are arrested, Risai is among the few who successfully escape arrest (though she's gravely injured and loses an arm) and continues to search for Gyousou and Taiki. She eventually flees to Han and then finds refuge in Kei where she beseeches Youko to somehow find either Taiki or Gyousou in order save Tai from a corrupt and totalitarian rule by a usurper whose rule violates the Mandate of Heaven.

== Kingdom of Kyou inhabitants ==
The following characters reside in the Kingdom of Kyou:

=== Shushou ===
Voiced by: Wakana Yamazaki (Japanese); Julie Maddalena (English)

Shushou (珠晶, Shushō), the queen of Kyou, has ruled for over 90 years, but she has the appearance of a young girl of twelve, since that was when she was chosen to become the new ruler. She ascended the throne twenty-seven years after the death of the previous king. Though strict and capricious, she has demonstrated herself to be a wise monarch. She also appears to have above-average strength in the anime, being able to make Shoukei bow her head to her with only two fingers. She and Kyouki have an odd relationship; she often lectures Kyouki not to be so naive and sympathetic. On some of these occasions, she slaps Kyouki, but explains her reasons and comments that she wishes she had a shorter kirin so it would be easier for her to slap him.

Before becoming king, Shushou lived in Renshou, the capital of Kyou, as the youngest daughter of a wealthy merchant. Though she lived a comfortable life and received a good education, she found could not tolerate how ordinary people continued to suffer in a country without a king. At the age of twelve, she ran away from home to go on a pilgrimage and climb Mount Hou in order to be selected as the next ruler of Kyou. Her story is told in one of the novels that was not animated, Tonan no Tsubasa (The Aspired Wings).

Shoukei, after her identity as the former princess of Hou is discovered by local townspeople and she is nearly executed, is sent away to Kyou, and reluctantly agrees to serve Shushou. Shushou shows no sympathy for Shoukei, believing that Shoukei was a fool who did nothing but play while Hou suffered and lacked the discernment to see her father's wrongs, and only allowed her to be brought to Kyou in order to prevent more chaos in Hou. It is believed that Shushou likely influenced Lord Gekkei, the governor of Hou's Kei Province, to lead revolt against the king of Hou in order to end his errant rule and appears to support his temporary rule of Hou as it prevents Hou from collapsing and reduces the number of refugees who come to Kyou.

=== Kyouki ===
Voiced by: Toru Okawa (Japanese); Michael McConnohie (English)

Kyouki (供麒) is the current Kirin of Kyou.

== Kingdom of Ren inhabitants ==
The following characters reside in the Kingdom of Ren:

=== Seitaku ===
Seitaku is the current King of Ren.

=== Renrin ===
Voiced by: Youmi Touma

Renrin is the current iirin of Ren.

== Kingdom of Ryuu inhabitants ==
The following characters reside in the Kingdom of Ryuu:

=== Rohou ===
Rohou is the current ruler of Ryuu.

=== Ryuuki ===
Ryuuki is the current kirin of Ryuu.

== Kingdom of Han inhabitants ==
The following characters reside in the Kingdom of Han:

=== Ranjou ===
Ranjou is the king of Han who has ruled his kingdom for 300 years.

=== Hanrin ===
Hanrin is the Kirin of Han.

== Kingdom of Sou inhabitants ==
The following characters reside in the Kingdom of Sou:

=== Senshin ===
Senshin is the king of Sou who has ruled for 600 years making him the longest-ruling king in the Twelve Kingdoms.

=== Sourin ===
Sourin is the Kirin of Sou.

== Hourai/Japan inhabitants ==
=== Yuka Sugimoto ===
Voiced by: Aya Ishizu (Japanese); Karen Strassman (English)

Yuka Sugimoto (杉本 優香, Sugimoto Yuka) is one of Youko's classmates in Japan and gets transported to Kou along with Youko and Asano. She enjoys fantasy books and is absolutely thrilled to be part of the adventure, believing that she is destined for greatness.

Destined to be a rival, Yuka becomes extremely jealous of Youko when she finds out that Youko is the "chosen one" and believes herself to be just as worthy. The King of Kou takes advantage of Yuka's confused feelings to convince her to fight against Youko. She later realizes her mistake after making up with Youko, helps her to rescue the kidnapped Keiki, and Youko sends her back to Japan. She is the one who tells Youko's human parents what truly happened to her. After her return, she cuts her already short hair, determined to not hide behind her fantasies. By that time, she also becomes friends with Taiki, who has lost his memory as a being from the Twelve Kingdoms.

In the novels, she is only mentioned in passing and does not go to the Twelve Kingdoms but remains in Hourai (Japan). Instead, she serves as a plot device to show Youko's lack of resistance to peer pressure.

=== Ikuya Asano ===
Voiced by: Yuji Ueda (Japanese); Joshua Seth (English)

Ikuya Asano (浅野 郁也, Asano Ikuya) is another one of Youko's classmates and has known Youko since childhood. He is transported to the kingdom of Kou with Youko and Sugimoto, and conceals his deep set apathy under an energetic demeanor. When Yuka turns on Youko, he finds his loyalty split between them and eventually goes missing after a battle between Yuka and Youko when he falls from a cliff. He is not seen by either of them for some time.

Asano eventually becomes part of a group of Shusei and works for them as they traveled through the kingdoms, but being in a completely alien country and lacking the ability to speak or understand the language, the strain has taken a toll on his sanity. He ends up travelling with Suzu and her friend Seishuu during their journey to Kei, though they are separated afterward.

As he continues to lose his mind, Asano questions the reason he was ever brought to Kou and seemingly can't find a reason for his life to go on. He finally finds Youko again, and she tells him about her adventures and how she's decided to stay and fight for Kei. She asks him to work for her and the resistance, and he accepts as his last chance of redemption, but while performing a mission for them, he is fatally stabbed by an enemy and loses consciousness in Shoukei's arms before he dies of his injuries.

In the novels, Asano does not exist and Youko attends an all-girls school.

=== Ritsuko Nakajima ===
Voiced by: Ai Satou (Japanese); Mari Devon (English); Rosa Campillo (German)

Ritsuko Nakajima (中嶋 律子, Nakajima Ritsuko) is the mother of Youko Nakajima and the wife of Masashi Nakajima. Ritsuko is a well-meaning mother who despite her stern manner cares greatly about her daughter. Despite her own personal preferences such as which schools she wants Youko to attend, she usually goes along with her husband's decisions as a dutiful wife. Because she doesn't want Youko to stand out or be mistaken as a delinquent, Youko's mother worries about Youko's naturally red hair and often tells her to cut it or dye it black. While her classmates generally saw Youko as a timid pushover or other negative views of her general indistinguishability, Ritsuko tells her husband that Youko was well-behaved, gentle, and predictable.

In the anime, Ritsuko eventually learns of her daughter's fate from Yuka Sugimoto when she returns from the Twelve Kingdoms. Although she was saddened that Youko will not come back, she is satisfied to know that Youko is doing well where she is. In the novels, it is unknown if her mother ever learns what became of Youko.

=== Masashi Nakajima ===
Voiced by: Takeshi Watabe (Japanese); Doug Stone (English)

Masashi Nakajima (中嶋 正志, Nakajima Masashi) is the father of Youko Nakajima and the husband of Ritsuko Nakajima who is implied to be a salaryman.
