= Crimson Gem Saga =

2008 video game

- Developer: IRONNOS
- Publishers: SK: SK Telecom; JP: Sega; NA: Atlus; WW: NateGames; (iOS)
- Platforms: PlayStation Portable iOS
- Release: PlayStation Portable: JP: October 23, 2008; NA: May 26, 2009; iOS: NA: August 3, 2010
- Genre: RPG
- Mode: Single-player

Crimson Gem Saga is a role-playing video game developed for the PlayStation Portable and iOS. It was developed by South Korean studio IRONNOS and published in Korea by SK Telecom as Astonishia Story 2. It was released in North America on May 26, 2009 by Atlus under the title Crimson Gem Saga, and was released in Japan under the title Garnet Chronicle by Sega.

The game is set in the world of Latein, where, unbeknownst to the public, an artifact formerly known as the Crimson Gem is being sought. One of the parties caught up in the whirlwind is Killian von Rohcoff, a recent graduate of the Green Hill Chevalier Academy, the game's protagonist. The game is a sequel in story to Astonishia Story, but since much of the game's mechanics were changed, the title in all regions was also changed.

== Gameplay ==
Combat in Crimson Gem Saga is similar to many turn-based RPGs. The most noticeable quirk is the ambush system. If contact between the player's icon and a generic monster icon occur on a field map, a battle will occur. If the player touches the monster icon while the monster is facing away from the player, the player will gain an immediate preliminary attack with the combined force of all party members. If the monster has a "!" symbol appear above their head, and contacts the player after that symbol disappears, the enemy may begin battle with a preemptive attack on the player with the combined force of all the enemy party members.

The game also features a weapon and skill customization system, as well as combination attacks that include anywhere from 2 to 4 party members.

== Plot ==
The story of the game revolves around the protagonist Killian von Rohcoff, who seems to always be on the wrong end of fate. He somehow gets caught up with the search for a powerful ancient artifact.

== Development and release ==
Crimson Gem Saga was developed by Ironnos. It was released in South Korea on 23 October 2008.

On August 3, 2010 Crimson Gem Saga was released on Apple's App Store for iOS. It was featured on the App Store's "New and Noteworthy" category for Role Playing iOS Games specifically and for all iOS Games, "Top Grossing Role Playing Game" and "What's Hot" categories. It has not been updated for years, and no longer functions on the current iOS.

== Reception ==
Reception

Aggregate scores
Aggregator	Score
GameRankings	(PSP) 79.02% (iOS) 69.75%
Metacritic	(PSP) 78/100 (iOS) 70/100

Review scores
Publication	Score
GamePro	(PSP) 4/5 (iOS) 3.5/5
GameSpot	5/10
GamesRadar+	3.5/5
GameZone	8.5/10
IGN	8.4/10
PlayStation: The Official Magazine	4/5

The game has received mixed reviews. GameRankings and Metacritic gave it a score of 79.02% and 78 out of 100 for the PSP version, and 69.75% and 70 out of 100 for the iOS version.

Most reviewers noted that the game doesn't do anything particularly innovative or new, but it follows the formula so well that they can forgive that. Many of the early reviews have also favorably commented on both the quality of the writing, and the quality of the voice acting. GameSpot has been the most critical so far, with their reviewer noting that they felt the game was simple and uninspired.
