= List of Tamagotchi! characters =

This is the list of characters appearing in the anime Tamagotchi! and its anime movies.

== Main characters ==
=== Mametchi ===
Voiced by: Rie Kugimiya (Japanese), Erica Mendez (Tamagotchi Friends webisode dub), Stephanie Sheh (Let's Go! Tamagotchi and Tamagotchi: The Movie's English dub)

Mametchi (まめっち) is the central character of the Tamagotchi! series. He is a member of the Mame family. He was born officially on November 23 and his star sign is Sagittarius. He is intelligent, kind-hearted, and easy to get along with. Mametchi is a young inventor who creates helpful inventions for his friends, but they have a chance of exploding. Mametchi is also tone-deaf, and isn't a good painter or singer at all. Almost everyone criticizes his singing except Melodytchi, who enjoys it. His singing would improve later in the anime. Mametchi's best friends are Memetchi and Kuchipatchi. The three have shared such close bonds since childhood. He has make friendly rival with KuroMametchi. He would later develop friendships with Lovelitchi (Lovelin). Himespetchi also has strong feelings for Mametchi that he's unaware of, but he still treats her like a friend.

In Tamagotchi!, Mametchi would forgive Lovelitchi for keeping her identity a secret, create Tama-Profiles that could store Tama-Hearts inside and give them to Lovelitchi & Melodytchi, and help save Tamagotchi Planet from an egg curse. In Tamagotchi! Yume Kira Dream, Mametchi, Memetchi, & Kuchipatchi depart to Dream Town. Mametchi initially homestayed with an elderly Tamagotchi named Ikaritchi, who initially treated him poorly but eventually changed his ways. After Ikaritchi departed to sell apples, Mametchi homestayed with Pianitchi at Music Cafe. In Tamagotchi! Miracle Friends, Mametchi assists Miraitchi & Clulutchi in retrieving the lost Dreambakutchis. In GO-GO Tamagotchi!, Mametchi reunites will all his friends as a result of the Tamagottsun. In the series finale of the Tamagotchi anime, Mametchi invents the DreamTama Rainbow, a submarine-like vehicle that permits transportation all across Tamagotchi Planet.

=== Lovelitchi/Lovelin ===
Voiced by: Kei Shindō (Japanese. Currently no English voice.)

Lovelitchi (ラブリっち, Raburitchi), also known as Lovelin (ラブリン, Raburin), is Tamagotchi Planet's most famous and youngest celebrity idol. She is born on September 10 and her star sign is Virgo. Usually the main female protagonist of the first series, Lovelitchi is a shy but kind girl who likes to meet new people and make friends. However she can be very nervous at times due to having many fans because of her Lovelin identity. Though Lovelitchi tends to get a lot of courage from her friends to stand up on her own. She also likes to help out others and likes singing, dancing and trying out new outfits. Lovelitchi is the daughter of Lovepapalitchi, who runs a photo shop and Lovemamalitchi, who runs the Tama Cafe on Tama Street, as well as a big sister to her new brother Lovesoratchi.

Lovelitchi usually lives a double life as Lovelin to prevent people from knowing her true identity while working on stage. As Lovelin, she is very confident and outgoing and likes her fans. She also acted in various shows and movies done by TAMAX-TV. Also, Lovelin is very good singer, with all of her songs being well known in the entire Tamagotchi Planet. However, it caused a lot of jealousy from some people especially to her past classmates in the previous schools she attended. She usually ended up getting bullied by her own classmates, using her popularity as a tool to get anything they desired. After she transferred to Tamagotchi School, Mametchi accepted her through open arms and treated her as a true tama-friend. After that, Mametchi and his friends knew her secret after she revealed it during his birthday party and decided to protect her double identity.

She usually makes acquaintances with Mametchi, Memetchi and Kuchipatchi and they appear in some of her shows. Mametchi supports her and have feelings with her. She became best friends with Melodytchi after seeing her perform on television and both of them became true Tama-Friends. By the end of the first series, she and the rest of the cast were absent after Mametchi, Memetchi and Kuchipatchi moved to Dream Town. She only make appeared once during Tamagotchi! Yume Kira Dream, in Episode 10 where she and the other Tamagotchis gave Mametchi a party to celebrate his birthday and welcome him back home. She then reappeared in GO-GO Tamagotchi and encounter with Yumemitchi and Kiraritchi in her Lovelin identity.

=== Memetchi ===
Voiced by: Ryōka Yuzuki (Japanese), Stephanie Sheh (Let's Go! Tamagotchi and Tamagotchi: The Movie's English dub)

Memetchi (めめっち) is the oldest sibling of the Meme Family and Imotchi's older sister. She's born on October 10 and her star sign is Libra. She, Mametchi and Kuchipatchi were all childhood friends when they were toddlers and remained best friends up to today. Usually very girly, feminine yet childlike, Memetchi is always obsessed about the curly hair on top of her head; she can get very angry even sensitive when people make fun of it. She can get quite angry at times, but she can be a crybaby when she's been bullied. Memetchi also likes fashion and accessories like Lovelitchi and usually has a rivalry with Makiko since they were young, and often fights with her to find out who has the better curls. But unlike Makiko, she herself matters friendship more than her looks.

Memetchi also has a special ability using her curls, on which she use it to sense things. She can also sense her surroundings and assume the correct path by curling it, thought this fails in some situations when her hair curl is damaged, or got wet in the rain. Her curl is also very delicate and she can lose her sense of direction when it got broken. By the first series's epilogue, she, Mametchi and Kuchipatchi had moved to Dream Town to study abroad in order to become the best hairdresser. She stays at the Salon De Dream, one of Dream Town's famous salons and also acts as a Saxophone Player for the Kira Kira Girls. She was then reunited by her old friends in GO-GO Tamagotchi, after the Tamagottsun event.

=== Kuchipatchi ===
Voiced by: Asami Yaguchi (Japanese), Evelyn Lantto (Let's Go! Tamagotchi and Tamagotchi: The Movie's English dub)

Kuchipatchi (くちぱっち) is the oldest sibling of the Kuchi Family and the older brother to both the Chibipatchi twins. He is born on May 18 and his stat sign is Taurus. He, Mametchi and Memetchi were all childhood friends when they were toddlers and remained best friends up to today. He is very dimwitted and usually very carefree but lazy, usually ending is speeches with tchi (っち, tchi). He is also shown to be very fond on food and likes to eat a lot of them, usually he cannot stop eating all at once.

Kuchipatchi himself has an ability to move his body like rubber and despite his looks he is very flexible, able to morph into a ball or stretch his own body. By the first series's epilogue, he, Mametchi and Memetchi had moved to Dream Town to study abroad in order to become the best cook. She stays at the Dream Hanten, Dream Town's Chinese restaurant and learns how to cook like a pro. He was then reunited by his old friends in GO-GO Tamagotchi, after the Tamagottsun event.

=== Telelin ===
Voiced by: Tomoko Kaneda (Japanese. Currently no English voice.)

Telelin (テルリン, Terurin) is Lovelitchi's priced cellphone that she received from her parents. She got it after she first became an idol star. However, during the events of Episode 27 when the cast were sent to the past, Telelin came to life after her power is needed to charge Mamemametchi's machine to save the planet and after returning to the present, she became a recurring main character. She has a strange personality and often makes an unexpected remark, which ends up with Lovelitchi/Lovelin scolding her. She also believes in paranormal activity and knows ghosts exist. Usually Lovelitchi carries her inside her bag.

=== Melodytchi ===
Voiced by: Yuuko Sanpei (Japanese. Currently no English voice.)

Melodytchi (メロディっち, Meroditchi) is an famous violinist hailing from Melody Land, Melodytchi is Lovelitchi's Tama Friend. She is born on December 29 and her star sign is Capricorn. Melodytchi is a very outgoing girl unlike Lovelitchi, along with being fun loving and confident. She is also like doing activities from her friends, but sometimes gets over-excited. She is also very optimistic and cheers people up when they're down. Melodytchi also works for TAMAX TV and usually performs alongside Lovelin in some of their performances. Her parents, Melomamatchi and Melopapatchi are both famous singers and composers in Melody Land. She is also shown to be fluent in English.

Usually she wears a black hat and sometimes takes it off to reveal her two cat-like ears. She usually stays in the Tama-Cafe alongside her Tama Pets Doremitchi and Sopratchi. Even though being away, she usually cares about her parents. Meloditchi is shown that she can't understand love but she likes to make jokes. She also like sweets and usually argues with Kuchipatchi sometimes over a cookie. Meloditchi also owns her priced instrument, the Melody Violin (メロディバイオリン, Merodi Baiorin) in which she plays it in all of her performances. The violin is given to her by the Queen of Melody land after her first performance and chose her as its owner. She calls her violin My Friend and discovers it has a spirit inside it.

By the end of the first series, she and the rest of the cast were absent after Mametchi, Memetchi and Kuchipatchi moved to Dream Town. She then reappeared in GO-GO Tamagotchi and became friends with Pianitchi.

=== Moriritchi ===
Voiced by: Chiwa Saitō (Japanese. Currently no English voice.)

Moriritchi (もりりっち, Moriritchi) is one of the owners of the Tamamori Shop and the younger sister of Anemoriritchi, Moriritchi is also one of Lovelitchi's best friends. Her birthday is in September 21 and her star sign is Virgo. First appearing in Episode 71 as a transfer student, Moriritchi is very outgoing girl who is active, bright and cheerful. She is also very good on Tamamori, a type of girly fashion present in Tamagotchi Planet and usually uses it to cheer her friends up. She usually has long, floppy ears, which she ties it into a fluffy cone-shaped hair and decorated with heart decorations.

She usually carries her camera, Pashalin onto her ears and she has a good relationship with her. By the end of the first series, she and the rest of the cast were absent after Mametchi, Memetchi and Kuchipatchi moved to Dream Town. She then reappeared in GO-GO Tamagotchi and became friends with Coffretchi and Candy Paku Paku.

=== Pashalin ===
Voiced by: Natsuko Kuwatani (Japanese. Currently no English voice.)

Pashalin (パシャリン, Pasharin) is Moriritchi's prized digital camera. She is first created in Antique Town by her inventor, Firumutchi before Moriritchi found it, but doesn't work. Due to a freak accident by Mametchi when fixing Pashalin, she accidentally came to life and has been friends with Moriritchi ever since. She has the same personality as Moriritchi and usually copies things that she says, and also likes to ride onto Moriritchi's ears. However Anemoriritchi despises her due to that she has embarrassing photos of her on which she wanted to be deleted. Thought Moriritchi was unaware of her sister's actions to her.

=== Spacytchi ===
Voiced by: Yasuyuki Kase (Japanese)

Spacytchi (スペイシーっち, Supeishītchi) is the leader of the Spacy Brothers (スペイシー･ブラザース, Supeishī Burazāsu), a group composed of him, Akaspetchi and Pipospetchi who originated on another planet to take over Tamagotchi Planet. He is very ambitious, stubborn and selfish yet he hides it from everyone as he behaves nicely to them. Though he desires to conquer the planet, his plans always fail miserably. He also has a short temper to his fellow brothers yet he cares for the both of them. Spacytchi claimed that aliens doesn't exist though he is one. Despite his selfish personality, he also shows a bit of kindness towards others and usually befriends Mametchi and the others in school, though he sometimes very reluctant on carrying out his plans. He has a crush on Himespetchi, however she doesn't usually notice him.

He and the others left near the end of the series, and appeared again in the first episode of Yume Kira Dream. It is unknown how he end up in Dream Town.

=== Akaspetchi ===
Voiced by: Miho Hino (Japanese. Currently no English voice.)

Akaspetchi (アカスペっち, Akasupetchi) is a member of the Spacy Brothers, a group composed of Spacytchi, Akaspetchi and Pipospetchi who originated on another planet to take over Tamagotchi Planet. He is very smart and mature, also very nice and friendly and nice but as evil as Spacytchi. He usually looks up after him and usually worried about things and panic sometimes. Spacytchi usually gets confused to him as he was always scolded him to stop talking. He usually refers Spacytchi as Aniki and end his speeches in de yansu (〜でヤンス, 〜 De yansu). He also has a crush at Imotchi, and he usually talks to her.

He and the others left near the end of the series, and appeared again in the first episode of Yume Kira Dream. It is unknown how he end up in Dream Town.

=== Pipospetchi ===
Pipospetchi (ピポスペっち, Piposupetchi) is a member of the Spacy Brothers, a group composed of Spacytchi, Akaspetchi and Pipospetchi who originated on another planet to take over Tamagotchi Planet. He is very kind and sweet however he is also the most evil of all the Spacy Brothers. Although this only comes out when the brothers are discussing their plans for world domination and think his plans are very dangerous. He also demonstrate incredibly powerful abilities and can lift heavy objects. He also sneaks away from the other brothers and does the job himself, with sometimes makes all of his plans work. He usually can't talk normally like the others and always speaks similar to a computer. It's also shown that he has a crush on Chamametchi and she is one of the people who can understand what he's saying.

He and the others left near the end of the series, and appeared again in the first episode of Yume Kira Dream. It is unknown how he end up in Dream Town.

=== Himespetchi ===
Voiced by: Yukana (Japanese)

Himespetchi (ひめスぺっち, Himesupetchi) is a female Tamagotchi and the princess of the planet she originated on, similar to the Spacy Brothers. She was born on February 14 and her star sign is Aquarius. Debuting in episode 114, Himespetchi came to Tamagotchi Planet in order to study for 6 months. She usually enjoys cooking and has a romantic personality, usually gushing out her love to Mametchi, and also can take his bad singing. She tries to keep this crush a secret from others, but is not very good at controlling herself when she daydreams about Mametchi. Himespetchi is very friendly and also outgoing girl and always daydreams about Mametchi as a hot guy all the time. She isn't shy like the others except when she's around Mametchi and has a tendency to be in the wrong place at the wrong time especially when he's with others girls which upsets her. Spacytchi has a crush on her as well, but she doesn't take any interest in him. Himespetchi also knew Spacytchi back on their home planet as well when they were little. She is shown to be scared on slugs and snails and usually says Gigakyun (ギガキュン, Gigakyun) and Gigashyun (ギガシュン, Gigashun) when she's embarrassed. She uses the Himespe Phone (ひめスペフォン, Himesupe fon) to predict the future and in order to win Mametchi's heart.

She also appears in Yume Kira Dream as she moved from Tamagotchi Town to Dream Town in order to be with Mametchi and also finish her studies. She also acts as the Drummer for the Kira Kira Girls. But by episode 34, her parents ordered her to return to her home planet and by episode 35, she left Tamagotchi Planet completely. She made a comeback in GO-GO Tamagotchi.

== Tamagotchi Town ==
=== Tamagotchi School ===
Kuromametchi (くろまめっち, Kuromametchi)
Voiced by: Nanae Katō (Japanese. Currently no English voice.)
Gozarutchi (ござるっち, Gozarutchi)
Voiced by: Kiyotaka Furushima (Japanese.Currently no English voice.)
Flowertchi (ふらわっち, Furawatchi)
Voiced by: Hinako Sasaki (Japanese. Currently no English voice.)
Makiko (まきこ, Makiko)
Voiced by: Akemi Okamura (Japanese. Currently no English voice.)
Uwasatchi (うわさっち, Uwasatchi)
Voiced by: Wasabi Mizuta (Japanese. Currently no English voice.)
Chamametchi (ちゃまめっち, Chiyamametchi)
Voiced by: Yuko Gibu (Japanese. Currently no English voice.)
Imotchi (いもっち, Imotchi)
Voiced by: Akiko Kawase (Japanese. Currently no English voice.)
Kikitchi (ききっち, Kikitchi)
Voiced by: Junko Takeuchi, Mayumi Yamaguchi (Japanese. Currently no English voice.)
Neenetchi (ねぇねっち, Neenetchi)
Voiced by: Akeno Watanabe (Japanese. Currently no English voice.)

A young chubby girl who is Orenetchi's older sister. Like Orenetchi, she had a crush on KuroMametchi and is a good cheerleader. She befriends Himespetchi in episode 3 of GO-GO Tamagotchi.

Orenetchi (おれねっち, Orenetchi)
Voiced by: Yuuko Sanpei (Japanese. Currently no English voice.)

A young boy who is Neenetchi's younger brother. He admires KuroMametchi to the point where he often daydreams of him. He is cheerful and can be mischievous. He is a member of DoriTama Eleven, DoriTama Town's soccer team.

Debatchi (でばっち, Debatchi)
Voiced by: Tokuyoshi Kawashima (Japanese. Currently no English voice.)
Mimitchi (みみっち, Mimitchi)
Voiced by: Yūko Gibu (Japanese. Currently no English voice.)
Watawatatchi (わたわたっち, Watawatatchi)
Voiced by: Yūko Gibu (Japanese. Currently no English voice.)
Nachuratchi (なちゅらっち, Nachiyuratchi)
Voiced by: Yuri Chinen (Japanese. Currently no English voice.)
Ponpontchi (ポンポンっち, Ponpontchi)
Voiced by: Akiko Kawase (Japanese. Currently no English voice.)
Sunopotchi (すのぽっち, Sunopotchi)
Voiced by: Jun Konno (Japanese. Currently no English voice.)
Togetchi (とげっち, Togetchi)
Voiced by: Jun Konno (Japanese. Currently no English voice.)
Hinotamatchi (ひのたまっち, Hinotamatchi)
Voiced by: Kiyotaka Furushima, Daisuke Matsuo (Japanese. Currently no English voice.)
Ringotchi (りんごっち, Ringotchi)
Voiced by: AKIKO, Miho Hino (Japanese. Currently no English voice.)
Dorotchi (どろっち, Dorotchi)
Voiced by: Katsuyuki Konishi (Japanese. Currently no English voice.)
Yattatchi (やったっち, Yattatchi)
Voiced by: Chika Fujimura (Japanese. Currently no English voice.)
Nemutchi (ねむっち, Nemutchi)
Voiced by: Akiko Kawase (Japanese. Currently no English voice.)
Octodogtchi (タコウィンナーっち, Takowinnātchi)
Voiced by: Yuri Chinen (Japanese. Currently no English voice.)
Gourmetchi (ぐるめっち, Gurumetchi)
Voiced by: Kana Uetake (Japanese. Currently no English voice.)
Kumattatchi (くまったっち, Kumattatchi)
Voiced by: Hinako Sasaki (Japanese. Currently no English voice.)
Eco-usatchi Triplets (エコうさっち, Ekousatchi)
Voiced by: Akiko Kawase
Atsuatsutchi (あつあつっち, Atsuatsutchi)
Voiced by: Kana Uetake (Japanese. Currently no English voice.)
Kunoitchi (くのいっち, Kunoitchi)
Voiced by: Nami Okamoto (Japanese. Currently no English voice.)
Sabusabutchi (さぶさぶっち, Sabusabutchi)
Voiced by: Nanae Katō (Japanese. Currently no English voice.)
Himetchi (ひめっち, Himetchi)
Voiced by: Nami Okamoto (Japanese. Currently no English voice.)
Nonopotchi (ののぽっち, Nonopotchi)
Voiced by: Miho Hino & Kana Uetake (Japanese. Currently no English voice.)
Young Mametchi (やんぐまめっち, Yangumametchi)
Voiced by:
Young Dorotchi (やんぐどろっち, Yangu Dorotchi)
Voiced by:
Bokutchi (ぼくっち, Bokutchi)
Voiced by:
Shoototchi (シュートっち, Shūtotchi)
Voiced by:
Shigurehimetchi (しぐれひめっち, Shigurehimetchi)
Voiced by:
Kuishinbotchi (くいしんぼっち, Kuishinbotchi)
Voiced by:
Perotchi (ぺろっち, Perotchi)
Voiced by: Taeko Kawata (Japanese. Currently no English voice.)

==== School Faculty ====
Principal Mimizu (ミミズ校長先生, Mimizu Kouchou Sensei)
Voiced by: Hiroshi Ōtake (Japanese. Currently no English voice.)
Grippatchi (ごりっぱっち, Gorippatchi)
Voiced by: Kurumi Mamiya (Japanese) English: Evelyn Lanto

She is the teacher of the Grippatchi's class, which consists of Mametchi, Memetchi, Kuchipatchi, Lovelitchi, Telelin, Melodytchi, Moriritchi, Pashalin, Himespetchi, Spacytchi, Kuromametchi, Gozarutchi, Flowertchi, Makiko, Uwasatchi, Debatchi, Mimitchi, Watawatatchi, Nachuratchi, Ponpontchi, Sunopotchi, Togetchi, Hinotamatchi, Ringotchi, Dorotchi, Yattatchi, Nemutchi, Tomomi, and Kizunatchi.

Mr. Turtlepedia (辞典亀先生, Jiten Kame Sensei)
Voiced by:

He is the teacher of the Mr. Turtlepedia's class, which consists of Chamametchi, Imotchi, Kikitchi, Akaspetchi, Pipospetchi, Octodogtchi, Gourmetchi, Kumattatchi, Eco-usatchi Triplets, Atsuatsutchi, Kunoitchi, Sabusabutchi, Himetchi, Nonopotchi, Young Mametchi, Young Dorotchi, Bokutchi, Shoototchi, Shigurehimetchi, Kuishinbotchi, and Perotchi.

Ms. Flower (フラワー先生, Fuwara Sensei)
Voiced by:
Professor Flask (フラスコ先生, Furasuko Sensei)
Voiced by: Kiyotaka Furushima (Japanese. Currently no English voice.)

Professor Flask is the teacher of the science class, which consists of Chamametchi, Imotchi, Kikitchi, Dorotchi, Kumattatchi, Gourmetchi, Octodogtchi, Kunoitchi, Nonopotchi, and Himetchi.

Mr. Dentaku (電卓先生, Dentaku-sensei)
Voiced by: Tokuyoshi Kawashima (Japanese. Currently no English voice.)
Ms. Houtaiko (包帯子先生, Houtaiko Sensei)
Voiced by:
Okkana-sensei (おっかな先生, Okkana-sensei)
Voiced by: Suguru Inoue (Japanese. Currently no English voice.)

=== Parents and Relatives ===
Papamametchi (ぱぱまめっち, PapaMametchi)
Voiced by: Tokuyoshi Kawashima (Japanese. Currently no English voice.)
Mamametchi (ままめっち, Mamametchi)
Voiced by: Akiko Kawase
Chamametchi (ちゃまめっち, ChaMametchi)
Voiced by: Yuko Gibu
Hapihapitchi (ハピハピっち, Hapihapitchi)
Voiced by: Satomi Kōrogi (Japanese. Currently no English voice.)
Memepapatchi (めめぱぱっち, Memepapatchi)
Voiced by:
Mememamatchi (めめままっち, Mememamatchi)
Voiced by:
PapaPatchi (ぱぱぱっち, Papapatchi)
Voiced by: Konishi Katsuyuki (Japanese. Currently no English voice.)
Mamapatchi (ままぱっち, Mamapatchi)
Voiced by: Kawase Akiko (Japanese. Currently no English voice.)
Chibipatchi (ちびぱっち, Chibipatchi)
Voiced by:
Lovepapalitchi (ラブパパリっち, Rabupaparitchi)
Voiced by: Jun Konno (Japanese. Currently no English voice.)
Lovemamalitchi (ラブママリっち, Rabumamaritchi)
Voiced by: Chika Fujimura (Japanese. Currently no English voice.)
Lovesoratchi (ラブソラっち, Rabusoratchi)
Voiced by: Aki Kanada (Japanese. Currently no English voice.)
Melopapatchi (メロパパっち, Meropapatchi)
Voiced by:
Melomamatchi (メロママっち, Meromamatchi)
Voiced by: Mariko Kouda (Japanese. Currently no English voice.)
Anemoriritchi (あねもりりっち, Anemoriritchi)
Voiced by: Rei Shimoda (Japanese. Currently no English voice.)
Papakizatchi (ぱぱきざっち, Papakizatchi)
Voiced by:
Mamaflowertchi (ママふらわっち, Mamafurawatchi)
Voiced by:
Kizatchi (きざっち, Kizatchi)
Voiced by:
Majorite (まじょりて, Majorite)
Voiced by: Mai Kadowaki (Japanese. Currently no English voice.)
Kashiratchi (かしらっち, Kashiratchi)
Voiced by:
Okugatatchi (おくがたっち, Okugatatchi)
Voiced by:
Safetytchi (安全おばっち, Anzenobatchi)
Voiced by:
Monsieur Kikipapa (ムッシュ･キキパパ, Musshu Kikipapa)
Voiced by:
Madame Kiki (マダム・キキ, Madamu Kiki)
Voiced by: Rumi Shishido (Japanese. Currently no English voice.)
Doremitchi (どれみっち, Doremitchi) and Sopratchi (そぷらっち, Sopuratchi)

Doremitchi and Sopratchi are Melodytchi's twin Tama-Pets, who accompany her during her stay in Tamagotchi Town. Doremitchi is more spoiled and loves to sing and dance while Sopratchi is more of a tomboy who looks after her twin. Both of them like Melodytchi's music on her Melody Violin and Melody Charm, however they despise Mametchi's singing voice due to it causes them to get annoyed. They are voiced by Satomi Korogi and Ken Miyake respectively.

Sitter Poketchi (シッターぽけっち, Shitta-Poketchi)

Poketchi is in charge of the Tama Sitter House. She is calm, sweet and patient, even when others are crying or screaming. She is voiced by Ikumi Nakagami.

=== Royalty ===
Gotchi King (ごっち大王, Gotchi Daiou)
Voiced by:
Gotchi Queen (たまご王女, Tamago Ōjo)
Voiced by:
Princess Tamako (たまこ姫, Tamako Hime)
Voiced by:
Princess Tamakoko (たまここ姫, Tamakoko Hime)
Voiced by:
Himebaratchi (たまここ姫, Himebaratchi)
Voiced by: Chiemi Chiba (Japanese. Currently no English voice.)

=== Citizens ===
Shinshitchi (しんしっち, Shinshitchi)
Voiced by: Masami Kikuchi (Japanese. Currently no English voice.)
Agetchi (あげっち, Agetchi)
Voiced by: Kana Ueda (Japanese. Currently no English voice.)
Happyburgertchi (ハッピーバーガーっち, Happībāgātchi)
Voiced by:
Oyajitchi (おやじっち, Oyajitchi)
Voiced by: Katsuyuki Konishi (Japanese. Currently no English voice.)

=== Tama Pet ===
Bagubagutchi (ばぐばぐっち, Bagubagutchi)
Voiced by:
Chitchi (ちっちー, Chitchī)
Voiced by:
Onsenmoguratchi (温泉モグラっち, Onsenmoguratchi)
Voiced by:
Puchiberitchi (ぷちベリっち, Puchiberitchi)
Voiced by:
Harapparatchi (はらっぱらっち, Harapparatchi)
Voiced by:
Shurikentchi
Voiced by:
Rubytchi (ルビーっち, Rubitchi)
Voiced by: Mika Kanai (Japanese. Currently no English voice.)

== Patchi Forest ==
Patchi Forest (ぱっちの森, Patchi no Mori) is a forest located just outside of Tamagotchi Town. It is home to Kuchipatchi and Nachuratchi.

=== Main characters ===
Beartchi (ぐまっち, Gumatchi)
Voiced by:
Guriguritchi (ぐりぐりっち, Guriguritchi)
Voiced by:

== TAMAX-TV and YUMEX-TV ==
=== TAMAX-TV ===
TamaPtchi (たまPっち, TamaPtchi)
Voiced by: Tokuyoshi Kawashima (Japanese. Currently no English voice.)
ADtchi (ADっち, ADtchi)
Voiced by:
Manenetchi (まねーねっち, Manēnetchi)
Voiced by: Nanae Katou (Japanese. Currently no English voice.)
Gotchiman (ゴッチマン, Gotchiman)
Voiced by:
Black Hat (ブラックハット, Burakku Hatto)
Voiced by:
Herotchi (ヒーローっち, Hīrōtchi)
Voiced by:
Madonnatchi (マドンナっち, Madonnatchi)
Voiced by: Rie Kugimiya (Japanese. Currently no English voice.)
Giragiratchi (ギラギラっち, Giragiratchi)
Voiced by: Yuka Takakura (Japanese. Currently no English voice.)
Don Paratchi (ドン・パラっち, Don Paratchi)
Voiced by:
Maisutatchi (マイスターっち, Maisutātchi)
Voiced by: Miyuki Sawashiro (Japanese. Currently no English voice.)
MC Puppetchi (MC ぱぺっち, MC Papetchi)
Voiced by:

=== YUMEX-TV ===
Okaytchi (オッケーっち, Okkētchi)
Voiced by: Kōichi Sakaguchi (Japanese. Currently no English voice.)
Dahlia Diva (ダリア・ディーバ, Daria Diiba)
Voiced by: Mariya Ise (Japanese. Currently no English voice.)
Daisy Dance (デイジ・ダンス, Deiji Dansu)
Voiced by: Natsuko Kuwatani (Japanese. Currently no English voice.)
Mikeytchi Ana (マイキーっちアナ, Maikītchi Ana)
Voiced by: Kei Shindou (Japanese. Currently no English voice.)
Tehetchi (てへっち, Tehetchi)
Voiced by: Ai Kayano (Japanese. Currently no English voice.)
Startchi (スターっち, Sutātchi)
Voiced by: Yonai Yuuki (Japanese. Currently no English voice.)
Benitchi (べにっち, Benitchi)
Voiced by: Masako Jou (Japanese. Currently no English voice.)
Doribons (どりばんず, Doribanzu)
Voiced by:

== Melody Land ==
Melody Land (メロディランド, Merodi Rando) is a musical town located far away from Tamagotchi Town. It is also the hometown of Melodytchi and Pianitchi.

=== Royalty ===
Queen of Melody Land (メロディランド女王, Merodi Rando Joou)
Voiced by: Mikako Takahashi (Japanese. Currently no English voice.)

=== Citizens ===
Taikotchi (たいこっち, Taikotchi)
Voiced by:

== North North Point ==
North North Point (のーすのーすぽいんと, Nosu nosu pointo) is a small village found at the top of Tamagotchi Planet, far from Tamagotchi Town. North North Point is similar the North Pole on Earth. It is the hometown of Nonopotchi, Sunopotchi and Yukipatchi.

=== Main characters ===
Santaclautchi (サンタクロっち, Santakurotchi)
Voiced by:
Rednosetchi (アカハナっち, Akahanatchi)
Voiced by:
Santabluetchi (サンタブルーっち, Santaburūtchi)
Voiced by:
Bluenosetchi (アオハナっち, Aohanatchi)
Voiced by:
Santagreentchi (サンタグリーンっち, Santagurīntchi)
Voiced by:
Greennosetchi (ミドハナっち, Midohanatchi)
Voiced by:
Santayellowtchi (サンタイエローっち, Santaierōtchi)
Voiced by:
Yellownosetchi (キイロハナっち, Kiirohanatchi)
Voiced by:

== Ha Island ==
=== Main characters ===
Kizunatchi (きずなっち, Kizunatchi)
Voiced by: Mariya Ise (Japanese. Currently no English voice.)

a young Tama heart collector who is actually the servant of HatoKamitchi, she appeared for the first time in Lovelitchi TamaProfy and she became extremely popular for her cute appearance, she often gets exited when Lovelitchi and Melodytchi getting a new heart, in the last episode of Tamagotchi! first series she evolved to her new from and leaving.

== The Earth ==
=== Main characters ===
Tomomi (ともみ, Tomomi)
Voiced by: Ayana Taketatsu (Japanese. Currently no English voice.)

== Dream Town ==
=== Main characters ===
Yumemitchi (ゆめみっち, Yumemitchi)
Voiced by: Misato Fukuen (Japanese) Christine Marie Cabanos (Tamagotchi Friends webisode dub)
Kiraritchi (キラリっち, Kiraritchi)
Voiced by: Megumi Toyoguchi (Japanese) Cassandra Lee Morris (Tamagotchi Friends webisode dub)
Yumecantchi (ゆめキャンっち, Yumekyantchi)
Voiced by: Ikumi Nakagami (Japanese. Currently no English voice.)
Pianitchi (ピアニっち, Pianitchi)
Voiced by: Fumiko Orikasa (Japanese. Currently no English voice.)
Coffretchi (コフレっち, Kofuretchi)
Voiced by: Mamiko Noto (Japanese. Currently no English voice.)
Miraitchi (みらいっち, Miraitchi)
Voiced by: Emiri Katō (Japanese. Currently no English voice.)
Clulutchi (くるるっち, Kururutchi)
Voiced by: Chiwa Saitō (Japanese. Currently no English voice.)
Watchlin (ウォッチリン, Uotchirin)
Voiced by: Etsuko Kozakura (Japanese. Currently no English voice.)
Smartchi (スマートっち, Sumātotchi) / Masked X (X仮面, X kamen)
Voiced by: Takahiro Mizushima (Japanese. Currently no English voice.)
X (エックス, Ekkusu)
Voiced by: Akeno Watanabe (Japanese. Currently no English voice.)
Candy Pakupaku (きゃんでぃぱくぱく, Kyandi Pakupaku)
Voiced by: Ai Matayoshi (Japanese. Currently no English voice.)

=== Dream School ===
Furifuritchi (ふりふりっち, Furifuritchi)
Voiced by: Chiwa Saitō (Japanese)
Tropicatchi (トロピカっち, Toropikatchi)
Voiced by: Satomi Kōrogi (Japanese)
Julietchi (ジュリエっち, Jurietchi)
Voiced by: Kawase Akiko (Japanese) Cristina Vee (Tamagotchi Friends webisode dub)
Patitchi (パティっち, Patitchi)
Voiced by: Yuko Gibu (Japanese. Currently no English voice.)
Nandetchi (なんでっち, Nandetchi)
Voiced by: Mariya Ise (Japanese)
Crepetchi (くれーぷっち, Kurēputchi)
Voiced by: Natsuko Kuwatani (Japanese. Currently no English voice.)
Righttchi (ライトっち, Raitotchi)
Voiced by: Sanpei Yuko (Japanese)
Knighttchi (ナイトっち, Naitotchi)
Voiced by: Chiaki Naitou (Japanese)
Hoshigirltchi (ほしガールっち, Hoshigārutchi)
Voiced by: Akemi Okamura (Japanese)
Gotchimotchi (ごっちもっち, Gotchimotchi)
Voiced by: Jun Konno (Japanese. Currently no English voice.)
Doyatchi (どやっち, Doyatchi)
Voiced by: Kiyotaka Furushima (Japanese. Currently no English voice.)
Acchitchi (あっちっち, Atchitchi)
Voiced by: Chika Fujimura (Japanese. Currently no English voice.)
Amakutchi (あまくっち, Amakutchi)
Voiced by: Hinako Sasaki (Japanese) Cristina Vee (Tamagotchi Friends webisode dub)
Karakutchi (からくっち, Karakutchi)
Voiced by: Kei Shindou (Japanese. Currently no English voice.)
Yukinkotchi (ゆきんこっち, Yukinkotchi)
Voiced by: Chiwa Saitō (Japanese) Cristina Vee (Tamagotchi Friends webisode dub)
Amiamitchi (あみあみっち, Amiamitchi)
Voiced by: Kei Shindou (Japanese)
Waltztchi (ワルツっち, Warutsutchi)
Voiced by: Chiwa Saitō (Japanese. Currently no English voice.)
Harptchi (ハープっち, Hāputchi)
Voiced by: Natsuko Kuwatani (Japanese. Currently no English voice.)
Tacttchi (タクトっち, Takutotchi)
Voiced by: Chiaki Naitou (Japanese. Currently no English voice.)
Monakatchi (もなかっち, Monakatchi)
Voiced by: Hinako Sasaki (Japanese. Currently no English voice.)
Hanafuwatchi (はなふわっち, Hanafuwatchi)
Voiced by: Chiaki Naitou (Japanese. Currently no English voice.)
Chouchotchi (ちょーちょっち, Chōchotchi)
Voiced by: Chiaki Naitou (Japanese. Currently no English voice.)
Rinkurutchi (りんくるっち, Rinkurutchi)
Voiced by: Ikumi Nakagami (Japanese. Currently no English voice.)
Majokkotchi (まじょっこっち, Majokkotchi)
Voiced by: Kuwatani Natsuko (Japanese. Currently no English voice.)
Pekopekotchi (ぺこぺこっち, Pekopekotchi)
Voiced by: Ikumi Nakagami (Japanese. Currently no English voice.)
Ameartotchi (あめあーとっち, Ameātotchi)
Voiced by: Hinako Sasaki (Japanese. Currently no English voice.)
Kurumakitchi (くるまきっち, Kurumakitchi)
Voiced by: Suguru Inoue (Japanese. Currently no English voice.)

=== School Faculty ===
Principal Omen (おめん校長, Omen-Kouchou)
Voiced by: Tokuyoshi Kawashima (Japanese)
Mr. Kokubantchi (こくばんっち先生, Kokubantchi Sensei)
Voiced by: Jun Konno (Japanese)

He is the teacher of the Mr. Kokubantchi's class, which consists of Mametchi, Memetchi, Kuchipatchi, Himespetchi, Spacytchi, Yumemitchi, Kiraritchi, Pianitchi, Coffretchi, Miraitchi, Clulutchi, Watchlin, Furifuritchi, Hoshigirltchi, Gotchimotchi, Doyatchi, Amakutchi, Karakutchi, Tacttchi, Hanafuwatchi, and Majokkotchi.

Ms. Hakubanko (はくばんこっち先生, Hakubankotchi Sensei)
Voiced by: Yukuna (Japanese. Currently no English voice.)

She is the teacher of the Ms. Hakubanko's class, which consists of Tropicatchi, Julietchi, Patitchi, Nandetchi, Smartchi, Crepetchi, Righttchi, Knighttchi, Acchitchi, Yukinkotchi, Amiamitchi, Waltztchi, Harptchi, Monakatch, Chouchotchi, Rinkurutchi, Pekopekotchi, Ameartotchi, and Kurumakitchi.

Mr. Robomechatchi (ロボメカっち先生, Robomekatchi Sensei)
Voiced by: Kiyotaka Furushima (Japanese)

Mr. Robomechatchi is the teacher of the mechanical class, which consists of Mametchi, Righttchi, Nandetchi, Hoshigirltchi, and Himespetchi. He is the teacher of the mechanical class at DoriTama School, which includes Mametchi, Himespetchi, Clulutchi, Righttchi, Nandetchi, and Mimitchi.

Mr. Micchi (みっちー先生, Mitchī Sensei)
Voiced by: Katsuyuki Konishi (Japanese)

Mr. Micchi is the teacher of the dance class, which consists of Yumemitchi, Kiraritchi, Furifuritchi, Knighttchi, and Jurietchi.

Mr. Comb-bowie (コームボウイ先生, Kōmubōi-Sensei)
Voiced by: Yuuki Hayashi (Japanese. Currently no English voice.)

Mr. Comb-bowie is the teacher of the hair-dressing class, which consists of Memetchi, Coffretchi, Doyatchi, Yukinkotchi, and Tropicatchi.

Mr. Grilltchi (グリルっち先生, Gurirutchi Sensei)
Voiced by: Kiyotaka Furushima (Japanese. Currently no English voice.)

Mr. Grilltchi is the teacher of the cooking class, which consists of Patitchi, Amakutchi, Karakutchi, Crepetchi, and Kuchipatchi. He is the teacher of the cooking class at DoriTama School, which includes Kuchipatchi, Patitchi, Candy Pakupaku, Perotchi, Amakutchi, Karakutchi, Gourmetchi, and Crepetchi.

Ms. Modetchi (モードっち先生, Mōdotchi Sensei)
Voiced by: Akemi Okamura (Japanese. Currently no English voice.)

Ms. Modetchi is the teacher of the fashion-designing class, which consists of Amiamitchi, Furawatchi, Spacytchi, Akaspetchi, and Pipospetchi. She is the teacher of the fashion-designing class at DoriTama School, which includes Memetchi, Moriritchi, Makiko, Neenetchi, Himespetchi, Kiraritchi, and Clulutchi.

Ms. Musicatchi (ムジカっち先生, Mujikatchi Sensei)
Voiced by: Chika Fujimura (Japanese. Currently no English voice.)

Ms. Musicatchi is the teacher of the music class, which consists of Tacttchi, Waltztchi, Harptchi, Pianitchi, Smartchi, and Rinkurutchi.

Marutentchi Sensei (まるてんっち先生, Marutentchi Sensei)
Voiced by:

Marutentchi Sensei is the teacher of the designing class, which consists of Miraitchi, Clulutchi, Watchlin, Pekopekotchi, Ameartotchi, and Kurumakitchi.

Ms. Trimmertchi (トリマっち先生, Torimatchi Sensei)
Voiced by:

Ms. Trimmertchi is the teacher of the Tama Pet-styling class, which consists of Acchitchi, Monakatchi, Chouchoutchi, and Gotchimotchi.

=== Parents and Relatives ===
Yumepapatchi (ゆめぱぱっち, Yumepapatchi)
Voiced by: Masaki Terasoma (Japanese. Currently no English voice.)
Yumemamatchi (ゆめままっち, Yumemamatchi)
Voiced by: Natsuko Kuwatani (Japanese)
Kirapapatchi (キラぱぱっち, Kirapapatchi)
Voiced by: Nobuaki Kanemitsu (Japanese. Currently no English voice.)
Kiramamatchi (キラママっち, Kiramamatchi)
Voiced by: Sanpei Yuko (Japanese)
Kiramotchi (キラもっち, Kiramotchi)
Voiced by: Mariya Ise (Japanese) Cristina Vee (Tamagotchi Friends webisode dub)
Papapianitchi (パパピアニっち, Papapianitchi)
Voiced by: Rikiya Koyama (Japanese. Currently no English voice.)
Mamapianitchi (ママピアニっち, Mamapianitchi) / Cafe Mama (カフェママ, KafeMama)
Voiced by: Akemi Okamura (Japanese)
Papacoffretchi (パパコフレっち, Papakofuretchi)
Voiced by: Hidenobu Kiuchi (Japanese. Currently no English voice.)
Mamacoffretchi (ママコフレっち, Mamakofuretchi)
Voiced by: Yuuko Sanpei (Japanese. Currently no English voice.)
Decoratchi (デコレっち, Dekoretchi)
Voiced by: Akiko Nakagawa (Japanese. Currently no English voice.)
Paparighttchi (パパライトっち, Paparaitotchi)
Voiced by: Suguru Inoue (Japanese. Currently no English voice.)
Mamarighttchi (ママライトっち, Mamaraitotchi)
Voiced by:
Doctor Future (ドクタフュチャ, Dokuta Fyucha)
Voiced by: Yūki Tai (Japanese. Currently no English voice.)

=== Tama Star Circus ===
Danchoutchi (団長っち, Danchōtchi)
Voiced by: Hidenari Ugaki (Japanese. Currently no English voice.)
Liontchi (ライオンっち, Raiontchi)
Voiced by: Yasuyuki Kase (Japanese. Currently no English voice.)
Pierotchi (ピエロっち, Pierotchi)
Voiced by: Tokuyoshi Kawashima (Japanese. Currently no English voice.)
Acrobatchi (アクロバっち, Akurobatchi)
Voiced by: Yuko Gibu (Japanese. Currently no English voice.)
Ichirinshatchi (いちりんしゃっち, Ichirinshatchi)
Voiced by: Suguru Inoue (Japanese. Currently no English voice.)

=== Citizens ===
Ikaritchi (いかりっち, Ikaritchi)
Voiced by: Yōsuke Akimoto (Japanese)
Chictchi (シックっち, Shikkutchi)
Voiced by: Kawase Akiko (Japanese. Currently no English voice.)
Psychetchi (サイケっち, Saiketchi)
Voiced by: Kei Shindou (Japanese. Currently no English voice.)
Chukatchi (ちゅうかっち, Chuukatchi)
Voiced by: Jun Konno (Japanese. Currently no English voice.)
Chinatchi (ちゃいなっち, Chainatchi)
Voiced by: Chiaki Naitou (Japanese. Currently no English voice.)
Fortune Teller (占い師のおばあさん, Uranaishi no obāsan)
Voiced by: Kumiko Takizawa (Japanese. Currently no English voice.)
Charatchi (チャラっち, Charatchi)
Voiced by: Suguru Inoue (Japanese. Currently no English voice.)
Wagassiertchi (わがシエっち, Wagashietchi)
Voiced by: Kenji Nojima (Japanese. Currently no English voice.)
Shirimotchi (しりもっち, Shirimotchi)
Voiced by: Jun Konno (Japanese. Currently no English voice.)
Madamtchi (マダムっち, Madamutchi)
Voiced by: Akeno Watanabe (Japanese. Currently no English voice.)
Enchoutchi (えんちょうっち, Enchoutchi)
Voiced by: Takeharu Ōnishi (Japanese. Currently no English voice.)

=== Tama Pet ===
Doyakentchi (どやけんっち, Doyakentchi)
Voiced by: Hino Miho (Japanese. Currently no English voice.)
Furilavutchi (ふりらぶっち, Furirabutchi)
Voiced by:
Monatototchi (もなトトっち, Monatototchi)
Voiced by: Chiaki Naitou (Japanese. Currently no English voice.)
Makimotchi
Voiced by:
Chapitchi (チャピっち, Chapitchi)
Voiced by: Hinako Sasaki (Japanese. Currently no English voice.)
Rinsetchi (リンスっち, Rinsutchi)
Voiced by:

== TamaGoLand ==
TamaGoLand is location of Tamagotchi Planet.

Motetchi (もてっち, Motetchi)
Voiced by: Yuka Terasaki (Japanese. Currently no English voice.)
Kyawatchi (きゃわっち, Kyawatchi)
Voiced by: Yurin (Japanese. Currently no English voice.)
