= Crunchyroll Store Australia =

Australian anime distribution company

Crunchyroll Pty. Ltd.
- Trade name: Crunchyroll Store Australia
- Formerly: Madman Anime Group Pty. Ltd. (2016–2022)
- Type: Division
- Industry: Entertainment
- Founded: 1996; 30 years ago (within Madman Entertainment); 12 October 2016; 10 years ago (as a separate company)
- Founder: Tim Anderson; Paul Wiegard
- Headquarters: Melbourne, Victoria, Australia
- Area served: Australia; New Zealand
- Key people: Brady McCollum (Crunchyroll SVP, International)
- Parent: Madman Entertainment (1996–2016); Crunchyroll, LLC (Note: Through a joint venture between Sony Pictures and Aniplex.) (2019–present)
- Website: store.crunchyroll.com.au

Crunchyroll Pty. Ltd. (trading as Crunchyroll Store Australia), previously known as Madman Anime, is an Australian video publisher and distribution company focused on Asian entertainment. The company handles licensing and distribution of anime in Australia and New Zealand. Originally part of independent film distributor Madman Entertainment, the company is now operated as a division of Crunchyroll, LLC, run by Sony through Sony Pictures and Aniplex.

== History ==
=== As part of Madman Entertainment ===
Madman Entertainment was founded in 1996 by Tim Anderson and Paul Wiegard as a mail order business specialising in imported anime titles, after following the success of Manga Entertainment in the United States and the United Kingdom. Originally selling titles on VHS, the company became the second Australian distributor to author DVDs in-house, with the 1995 film Ghost in the Shell being their first DVD release. In 1998, Madman began airing anime on television, with Neon Genesis Evangelion airing on SBS TV.

At the 2008 Supanova Pop Culture Expo, Madman Entertainment announced plans to explore new distribution methods. Madman Entertainment launched the Madman Screening Room, a video on demand streaming service, with School Rumble being the first title on the platform. Madman Entertainment also began releasing Blu-ray Disc titles, starting with The Transformers: The Movie in June 2009. On 1 June 2009, Madman Entertainment produced an English adaption of Tamagotchi: The Movie, a 2007 film based on the Tamagotchi digital pets from Bandai and WiZ. Madman also intended to dub the film's sequel, Tamagotchi: Happiest Story in the Universe!, but the dub was cancelled for unknown reasons.

In early 2016, Madman Entertainment announced Madman Anime Festival, an annual anime convention to celebrate its 20th anniversary. The convention was held in Melbourne on 3–4 September of that year.

=== As Madman Anime Group Pty. Ltd. ===
On 12 October 2016, Madman Anime Group Pty. Ltd. was incorporated as a separate company, being a wholly owned subsidiary of Madman Entertainment.

On 17 February 2018, Madman co-founder & CEO Tim Anderson confirmed that on 15 November 2017, Aniplex had acquired a minority interest in Madman Anime Group, and was issued an undisclosed number of shares.

In late 2018, Madman Anime confirmed that they had reached a distribution deal with Funimation, with Madman Anime becoming the local distributors for select Funimation titles in Australia and New Zealand, and Funimation handling licensing and localisation for titles.

On 6 February 2019, Madman Entertainment's owners Five V Capital sold Madman Anime Group to Aniplex for A$35 million.

On 24 September 2019, Aniplex and Sony Pictures Television announced that they were consolidating their international anime streaming services under a new joint venture comprising Funimation, Madman Anime Group and Wakanim. The consolidation reorganised AnimeLab as a direct subsidiary of Funimation.

The company changed its name to Crunchyroll Pty. Ltd. on 23 March 2022, following the rebranding of its parent company Funimation to Crunchyroll, LLC.

On 29 March 2022, Madman Anime announced that Madman Anime Festival would be replaced with Crunchyroll Expo Australia, with the first event scheduled for Melbourne on 17–18 September 2022.

== Notable titles ==
Crunchyroll Store Australia hosts notable titles that are also licensed by Crunchyroll, LLC itself and sibling company Aniplex of America in the United States as well as Sentai Filmworks such as Dragon Ball, One Piece, Love, Chunibyo & Other Delusions, My Hero Academia, Clannad, Fairy Tail, Persona 5: The Animation and Spy × Family.

== AnimeLab ==
AnimeLab
- Logo used from 2019 to 2021
- Company type: Subsidiary
- Website type: Video on demand
- Available in: English
- Dissolved: 9 December 2021; 4 years ago
- Predecessor: Madman Screening Room
- Area served: Australia and New Zealand
- Parent: Crunchyroll, LLC
- Website: animelab.com at the Wayback Machine (archived 2021-12-07)
- Commercial: Yes
- Registration: Required
- Users: 1 million (2018)
- Launched: 28 May 2014; 12 years ago

AnimeLab Pty. Ltd. was a video on demand service that specialised in the online streaming and simulcasting of Japanese anime series, serving the Australian and New Zealand market.

AnimeLab originally launched in beta on 28 May 2014 as a Madman Entertainment skunkworks project with 50 series and 700 episodes, and replaced the Madman Screening Room. During its beta, AnimeLab streamed its series for free without advertisements. Originally streaming titles exclusively from Madman's catalogue, on 4 September 2014, distributor Siren Visual announced that they would release titles on AnimeLab, starting with The Devil Is a Part-Timer!. AnimeLab also simulcasted Fate/stay night: Unlimited Blade Works, despite Hanabee acquiring the distribution license for the series.

On 26 May 2015, AnimeLab announced that the website had exited beta, and introduced a paid subscription, alongside an ad-based free service.

In August 2016, AnimeLab launched AnimeLab On-Air, an anime programming block airing on Friday nights on C31 Melbourne and C44 Adelaide. The block later moved to a Monday night schedule.

On 25 August 2017, AnimeLab announced that they would begin streaming select titles from Adult Swim's back catalogue. The Adult Swim titles were later removed in 2020.

At Madman Anime Festival Melbourne 2018, AnimeLab announced that they had reached one million users. AnimeLab also announced a collaboration with the Australian Red Cross to promote blood donations in Australia with the simulcast of Cells at Work!.

On 24 January 2020, Funimation announced that it would be shutting down access to FunimationNow in Australia and New Zealand on 30 March, merging all of Funimation's titles onto AnimeLab.

On 10 June 2021, AnimeLab announced that it would begin the process of rebranding as Funimation on 17 June, with current AnimeLab subscriber credentials being transitioned onto Funimation's website on that date, and staff transitioning to Funimation ANZ. On 2 November 2021, AnimeLab announced that it would retire the service on 9 December 2021.

== See also ==
- Madman Entertainment
- Lucy-May of the Southern Rainbow
- Crunchyroll UK and Ireland, a UK branch of Crunchyroll formerly known as Manga Entertainment
