= Asami Yaguchi =

Japanese voice actress (1979–2026)

- 矢口 アサミ(やぐち アサミ)
- Born: July 31, 1979; Saitama Prefecture, Japan
- Died: September 26, 2026 (aged 47)
- Other name: Yagucchan (やぐっちゃん)
- Occupation: Voice actress
- Years active: 2003–2026
- Agent: Kenyu Office
- Website: Official profile

Asami Yaguchi (矢口 アサミ, Yaguchi Asami; July 31, 1979 – September 26, 2026) was a Japanese voice actress, affiliated with Kenyu Office.

== Early life and career ==
Asami Yaguchi was born in Saitama Prefecture, Japan on July 31, 1979. As a child, she would get sick and often miss kindergarten and elementary school. When off sick from kindergarten, she would watch the puppet show Niko Niko Pun on NHK Educational TV's program Okaasan to Issho. The character of Porori Kajiriacchi III was her very first love and seeing Ryūsei Nakao's name printed on the Niko Niko Pun cassette tape made her vaguely realize for the first time, "Oh, so that kind of job actually exists." While she had a passion for acting, the absence of a drama club at her junior high school inspired her to instead pursue a career as a voice actress.

However, because she was naturally introverted during junior high school, she couldn't bring herself to say it, so instead, following the advice of her parents, she thought of becoming a nurse.

While attending a science-oriented high school, she felt lost about her future career path but was deeply inspired when a friend, who wanted to become a manga artist, openly declared, "I'm going to become a manga artist" without any embarrassment. This event gave her the courage to confess her own secret and ever since then, she pursued her dream to voice act.

She graduated from the Yoyogi Animation Academy and the 81 Produce Acting Institute. After she trained at Kenyu's seiyuu training school talk back, she became affiliated with Kenyu Office.

== Personal life ==
=== Features and hobbies ===
Yaguchi's vocal range was alto.

Her personal hobbies were painting, writing novels, baking and karaoke, while her special skills were calligraphy, Kendo, sword fighting and action stunts.

Her personal favorite anime was Doraemon and she admired Kazuya Tatekabe, the voice actor of the character Gian in the series. Tatekabe considered her a favorite of his and she would refer to Tatekabe as "master" during his lifetime. He was also a member of the same agency, Kenyu Office. She voiced the reoccurring minor character Haruo in the 2005 Doraemon television anime series from 2018 until her death.

=== Death ===
Yaguchi died of heart failure on September 26, 2026, at the age of 47. Kenyu Office announced the news of her death two days later on September 28.

Doraemon co-stars Tomokazu Seki and Wasabi Mizuta paid tribute and wrote eulogies for Yaguchi. Episodes of Doraemon featuring Yaguchi's performance as Haruo recorded prior to her death will air posthumously. The Fujiko F. Fujio Museum also expressed condolences.

== Filmography ==
=== Television animation ===
List of voice performances in television animation
Year	Title	Role	Notes	Source
2003	Human Crossing	Akemi	Ep. 12; Voice acting debut	
2004	Fantastic Children	Tarlant		
2007	Saa Ikō! Tamagotchi	Kuchipatchi		
2008	Net Ghost PiPoPa	Kōsuke Kitayama		
2009	Gintama	Young Gintoki Sakata		
2009	Tamagotchi!	Kuchipatchi		
2010	Super Robot Wars Original Generation: The Inspector	Katina Tarask		
2012	One Stormy Night: Secret Friends	Rossa		
2012	Tamagotchi! Yume Kira Dream	Kuchipatchi		
2013	Tamagotchi! Miracle Friends	Kuchipatchi		
2014	Go-Go Tamagotchi!	Kuchipatchi		
2017	Dies Irae	Eleonore Von Wittenburg		
2018	Doraemon	Haruo, Sun Wukong, Empty Can, Old Woman, Aunt, Grandmother		
2019	Star Twinkle PreCure	Boy	Ep. 18	
2026	Pocket Monsters: Wonder Voyage	Meloco	Posthumous release	

=== Theatrical animation ===
List of voice performances in theatrical animation
Year	Title	Role	Notes	Source
2006	Gekijouban Harukanaru Toki no Naka De: Maihitoyo	Townspeople		
2007	Tetsujin 28: Morning Moon of Midday	Additional voice		
2007	Tamagotchi: The Movie	Kuchipatchi		
2008	Tamagotchi: Happiest Story in the Universe!	Kuchipatchi		
2010	Trigun: Badlands Rumble	Boy		
2017	Tamagotchi: Secret Delivery Operation!	Kuchipatchi	Short film	
2019	Doraemon: Nobita's Chronicle of the Moon Exploration	Haruo		
2020	Doraemon: Nobita's New Dinosaur	Haruo		
2024	Doraemon: Nobita's Earth Symphony	Haruo		

=== Original video animation (OVA) ===
List of voice performances in original video animation
Year	Title	Role	Notes	Source
2008	Gintama: Birth of the White Demon	Young Gintoki Sakata		
2010	Black Lagoon: Roberta's Blood Trail	Sawyer the Cleaner		
2011	Busou Shinki: Moon Angel	Child		

=== Dubbing ===
==== Animation ====
List of dubbing performances in overseas animation
Year	Title	Role	Notes	Source
2023	Rubble & Crew	Auntie Crane (Sabrina Jalees and Lisa Norton)		
