= Yūko Gibu =

Japanese voice actress (born 1981)

Yuko Gibu
- 儀武 ゆう子
- Born: January 28, 1981 (age 45); Okinawa Prefecture, Japan
- Other names: Ryuu Ueto (上戸琉); Homi Momoi (桃井穂美); Kokoro Kuroiwa (黒岩心々); Kazuno Kotenjou (古天条花寿乃)
- Occupation: Voice actress
- Years active: 2004–present
- Children: 1

Yuko Gibu (儀武 ゆう子, Gibu Yūko; born January 28, 1981 in Okinawa Prefecture, Japan) is a Japanese voice actress.

== Filmography ==
=== Anime ===
List of voice performances in anime
Year	Title	Role	Notes	Source
2004	Final Approach	Ryou (young)		
2005	MÄR	Lilith's sister		
2005	Petopeto-san	Girl		
2005	Chibi Vampire	Fukumi Naito, Vampire		
2005	Koi Koi Seven	Akiwo Suzuka		
2006	Kashimashi: Girl Meets Girl	Mari		
2006	Yoshinaga-san Chi no Gargoyle	Kikuichimonji		
2006	Utawarerumono	Sister		
2006	Otogi-Jūshi Akazukin	Chie		
2006	Tsuyoku Cool × Sweet ja:つよきす Cool×Sweet	Tsushima Leo (boyhood) / Chrysanthemum 対馬レオ（少年時代）/お菊		
2006	Kemonozume	Toshihiko (5 years old)		
2006	Pumpkin Scissors	Peter		
2006	Living for the Day After Tomorrow	Child		
2006	Megaman Star Force	Kizamaro Saishoin		
2007	Hayate the Combat Butler	Animator		
2007	Robby and Kerobby ja:ロビーとケロビー	Tanuki		
2007	Over Drive	Audience		
2007	Teachers' Sister the Animation ja:家庭教師のおねえさん	Shiori Nagisa 汐乃渚	OVA adult, Also sequel in 2010–11	
2007	Devil May Cry	Child		
2007	Dōjin Work	Venue announcer, female guest		
2007	Pururun! Shizuku-chan Aha	Get blown away かぜまる		
2007	Shooting Star Rockman Tribe	Kizamaro Saishoin		
2007	Now Icho! Tamagotchi さぁイコー！ たまごっち	Mimichi, Chamametchi		
2008	Net Ghost PiPoPa	Tellurun, Bat, Takumi Kuze		
2009	Pandora Hearts	Boy		
2009	Beyblade: Metal Fusion	Various characters		
2009	Umi Monogatari	Suzuki		
2009	Fight Ippatsu! Jūden-chan!!	Rinko		
2009	Sweet Blue Flowers	Akira Okudaira		
2009	Tamagotchi!	Chamametchi		
2010	Katanagatari	O Haira		
2010	B Gata H Kei	Akai-sensei		
2010	Maid Sama!	Gon-chan		
2010	Giant Killing	Kota Tanuma		
2010	The Legend of the Legendary Heroes	Iluna Laswhale		
2010	MM!	Yumi Mamiya		
2010–13	The World God Only Knows series	Yukie Marui, Various characters (utility role)	2 seasons	
2011	Wandering Son	Tamaki Sato		
2011	Suite PreCure	Waon Nishijima, Parrot		
2011	Hyouge Mono	Ryuko Akizuki		
2011	C	Bell		
2011	Croisée in a Foreign Labyrinth	Vagrant child		
2011	Usagi Drop	Mother		
2011	The Mystic Archives of Dantalian	Man B		
2011–13	Tamayura series	Maon Sakurada		
2011	Sekai-ichi Hatsukoi	Izaka's mother	season 2	
2012	Accel World	Mana Itosu		
2012	Love, Election and Chocolate	Nozomi Edagawa		
2012	So, I Can't Play H!	Satomi Kaga		
2012	Tamagotchi! Yume Kira Dream	Pattych, Chamametchi, Acrobatches パティっち/ちゃまめっち/アクロバっち		
2012	Blast of Tempest	Girl		
2012	Code:Breaker	Momiji, Puppy		
2012	Bakuman. 3	Ririka Kitami		
2012	Medaka Box Abnormal	Shoko Kamimine		
2012	Robotics;Notes	Hayakawa		
2012	Hanayaka Nari, Waga Ichizoku ja:華ヤカ哉、我ガ一族	Fumiko Ariyoshi	OVA	
2013	Encouragement of Climb	Various characters		
2014	Hamatora	Cooking teacher		
2014	47 prefectures dogs R ja:47都道府犬R	Okinawa dog		
2014	Wizard Barristers	Keiji		
2014	Zetsumetsu Kigu Shōjo Amazing Twins	Kasuka Mochizumi	OVA series	
2014	Majin Bone	Momotaro, Miss Keiko		
2014	M3 the dark metal	Obaba		
2014	Denkigai no Honya-san	Boy with hat		
2014	Girl Friend Beta	Chizuru Onodera		
2015	Yurikuma Arashi	Kumacaron		
2015	Go! Princess PreCure	Moe Haruno, Yuki Aihara (young)		
2015	Maro no Kanja wa Gatenkei ja:麻呂の患者はガテン系 咲美の章	Sakumi Ayase 綾瀬咲美	OVA Adult series As Akina Kashiwa	
2016	Tabi Machi Late Show ja:旅街レイトショー	Haruka		
2016	Divine Gate	Hiroto		
2016	Ao no Kanata no Four Rhythm	Minori Hosaka		
2016	Anne Happy	Sakura Hanakoizumi, Hibiki's mother		
2017	BanG Dream!	Ririko Matsugi		
2022	Utawarerumono: Mask of Truth	Fumirul		
2025	Okinawa de Suki ni Natta Ko ga Hōgen Sugite Tsurasugiru	Sachiko Kyan		

=== Films ===
List of voice performances in film
Year	Title	Role	Notes	Source
2006	Fist of the North Star: The Legends of the True Savior	Kenshio (young)		
2007	Tamagotchi: The Movie	Chamametchi		
2008	Pattenrai!! ~ Minami no Shima no Mizu Monogatari	Miyo Aragaki		
2008	Tamagotchi: Happiest Story in the Universe!	Chamametchi		
2015	Tamayura films	Maon Sakurada		

=== Video games ===
List of voice performances in video games
Year	Title	Role	Notes	Source
2010	Love, Election and Chocolate games	Nozomi Edagawa	PC adult As Momoi Homomi. Also PSP version in 2012.	
2012	Girl Friend Beta	Chizuru Onodera		
2016	Utawarerumono: Futari no Hakuoro	Fumiriru	PS3, other	

=== Drama CDs ===
List of voice performances in drama CDs and audio recordings
Year	Title	Role	Notes	Source
2011–13	Tamayura	Maon Sakurada	Drama CD and Radio	

=== Dubbing ===
==== Live-action ====
- The Firmament of the Pleiades ja:蒼穹の昴, various characters (utility role)
