= List of Accel World characters =

The Accel World light novel and anime series features a large cast of characters created by Reki Kawahara and illustrated by HIMA. Set in Tokyo in 2046 when devices known as Neuro-Linkers have enabled fully integrated augmented reality, the main character Haruyuki Arita is offered a virtual reality massive multiplayer online (VRMMO) fighting game called Brain Burst by Kuroyukihime, the student council vice-president at his school. Together with Kuroyukihime and his other friends, Haruyuki fights as a Burst Linker to ultimately attain level 10, the highest attainable level, and meet the creator of Brain Burst to learn its true purpose.

== Nega Nebulas (Black Legion) ==
The main characters are members of Nega Nebulas, also known as the Black Legion.

=== Haruyuki Arita ===
Haruyuki Arita (有田 春雪, Arita Haruyuki) is the main protagonist of Accel World. Commonly referred to as Haru by his close friends, he is a short and overweight boy with low self-confidence until he meets Kuroyukihime. Although he is generally smart and careful when it comes to everyday life, Haru tends to get reckless while protecting Kuroyukihime. He views her as a mentor, friend, and lover simultaneously, which has given him the utmost respect and loyalty toward her and her army. His non-accelerated avatar is a small pig that was originally forced on him by one of the delinquents, only keeping it because Kuroyukihime finds it "cute." While in Akihabara, Blood Leopard gives him a different avatar to fit in, taking the form of a small pink lizard.

Haru's Brain Burst avatar, Silver Crow (シルバー・クロウ, Shirubā Kurou), has a tall, thin, fragile metallic frame that is completely devoid of weapons, forcing Haru to fight barehanded. His avatar was created by his desires to be thinner and fly away into the sky in order to escape his miserable life. The avatar possesses a mouth underneath its visor, allowing Silver Crow to eat while in the game world. Silver Crow is the first and only avatar with the ability to fly, sprouting wings on its back when its special ability is activated. Lacking in both physical strength and defensive capability, Silver Crow is dependent on Haru's squash-honed speed and reflexes in order to survive fights. Silver Crow's default finishing move is a basic headbutt, typically ineffective in most circumstances. Haru eventually learns how to utilize the Incarnate System (IS) to focus his willpower, gaining the ability to form energy blades from the bracers on Silver Crow's forearms, a technique he names "Laser Sword", and later refines into more powerful and far-reaching versions called "Laser Lance" and "Laser Javelin". He also gains eventually another Incarnate Skill called "Light Speed" that sharply increases the speed of his flight for a short time.

For a period of time, Silver Crow has the Disaster Armor Enhanced Armament and becomes the 6th Chrome Disaster. In this form, he can predict the attacks of his opponents and use all the abilities of previous Chrome Disasters. In one battle, he can partially summon the uncorrupted form of The Destiny, which is one of the Seven Arcs used to form the Chrome Disaster Armament that was created by Chrome Falcon. Haruyuki is voiced by Yuki Kaji in Japanese and Erik Scott Kimerer in English.

=== Kuroyukihime ===
Kuroyukihime (黒雪姫; lit. Black Snow Princess) is the leader of the Nega Nebulas legion. Her real name is Sayuki Kuroba (黒羽 早雪, Kuroba Sayuki) (although Sky Raker calls her "Sacchan"). Her pseudonym is Japanese word play with Snow White Shirayukihime (白雪姫; lit. White Snow Princess). Beautiful and popular, she is also the Student Council Vice-President at Umesato Junior High School. She has been a Burst Linker since she was eight years old. Kuroyukihime was formerly the Black King, although she was driven into hiding after beheading the first Red King, Red Rider, while trying to defeat the other kings to reach level 10. She values Haru as more than a subordinate and is often the voice of reason to him when he is willing to go to extremes to protect her. Prior to her hospitalization, she confesses to Haru that she fell in love with him. Her non-accelerated avatar is her real-world self dressed in black and sporting red and black butterfly wings. She is estranged from her family since she injured her sister, who is also the White King, out of anger after learning that she was tricked by her.

Her Brain Burst avatar is Black Lotus (ブラック・ロータス, Burakku Rōtasu), also known as "World End", a slender robot with a feminine form which features limbs ending in sharp blades. These weapons instantly cut anything they touch due to the Absolute Cutting Property the avatar possesses, which has the side effect of permanently removing whatever is cut from an opponent's avatar. However, the blades have a frail lateral portion that breaks after receiving too much damage. To compensate for this weakness, Kuroyukihime developed a technique she calls "Soft Act". Black Lotus has three special abilities: Death by Barraging; Death by Embracing, which was used on Red Rider; and Death by Piercing, a one-hit-kill direct attack. She also has three incarnate system skills: "Vorpal Strike", "Star Burst Stream" and "The Eclipse", that she learned from her former subordinate Graphite Edge. Lotus also displays an ability called Overdrive: Mode Green, which causes the purple parts of its body to turn green and increase its speed and attack power for a limited time. Lacking feet, Black Lotus hovers slightly off the ground via air jets on the legs, with which it is able to achieve incredible speeds. Kuroyukihime is voiced by Sachika Misawa in Japanese and Kira Buckland in English.

=== Takumu Mayuzumi ===
Takumu Mayuzumi (黛 拓武, Mayuzumi Takumu) is Haru's childhood friend and Chiyuri's boyfriend at the start of the series, nicknamed "Taku." Being smart and athletic, he attends a prestigious school. His non-accelerated avatar is the tin man. Initially, he abuses the enhanced reflexes he obtains while accelerated to have an advantage in the kendo tournaments he attends in real life. After Kuroyukihime is hospitalized, Takumu attempts to assassinate her until he is stopped by Haru, who convinces him to join forces. After confessing to Chiyu about what he's done, it seems they've broken up. Despite that he is waiting to see if Chiyu would get back together with him. He is a mentor figure to Haru due to his advanced knowledge of the Accelerated World. After teaming up with the Nega Nebulas, he transfers to Umesato Junior High School and begins wearing glasses despite the Neuro-Linker's ability to correct vision problems, wanting to see the world through his own eyes. Takumu was bullied throughout elementary school, possessing a scar on his neck from the beatings he would receive from the kendo team.

His Brain Burst avatar, Cyan Pile (シアン・パイル, Shian Pairu), features a large frame reminiscent of a knight. Its primary weapon is a large pile driver Enhanced Armament mounted on the right forearm, which is able to extend its spike to incredible distances. Upon learning the Incarnate System, Taku obtains the ability to transform it into a huge sword, which he calls "Cyan Blade". Cyan Pile also has access to Splash Stinger, a series of needle guns hidden under the chest armor. Cyan Pile's special ability is "Lightning Cyan Spike", which charges the pile driver weapon with electrical energy before firing. Takumu is voiced by Shintaro Asanuma in Japanese and Lucien Dodge in English.

=== Chiyuri Kurashima ===
Chiyuri Kurashima (倉嶋 千百合, Kurashima Chiyuri) is Haru and Takumu's childhood friend. At the start of the series she is dating Takumu, but after Haru and Takumu confess about the Cyan Pile incident they seem to have broken up. It is implied that she cares for Haru as more than a friend. Her non-accelerated avatar is a catgirl. After Takumu and Haru come clean with her and tell her about the Accelerated World, she demands the program for herself, wanting to show her friends how to enjoy the game and not take it too seriously. Fearing the game is tearing them apart, her main goal as a Burst Linker is to rekindle the close friendship she, Taku, and Haru once shared as children. Kuroyukihime wonders if she is mentally strong enough to use Brain Burst, but the group eventually gives in and gives her the program. To her friends' surprise, the program installs successfully.

Her Brain Burst avatar, Lime Bell (ライム・ベル, Raimu Beru), appears as a witch girl with an Enhanced Armament resembling a large bell containing a clock face replacing the left forearm. Her avatar was created from her desire to return to the life she had when she, Haru, and Takumu had a very close friendship. Lime Bell's special ability is known as "Citron Call", a healing ability which can fully recover any Duel Avatar it targets. However, in the final battle with Dusk Taker, Chiyuri reveals the true ability of Citron Call: to reverse time on the target so that the damage never existed. This also applies to the target's special abilities as well, demonstrated by Lime Bell reversing time on Dusk Taker so that he never took Silver Crow's wings. Lime Bell is the third avatar with a healing ability, the first being one of the current kings and the second having retired after uninstalling Brain Burst because healers are coveted and fought over in Accel World. In Vol 15, she used IS on her own due to her overwhelming feelings of love for her friends, a situation that is the complete reverse to how Chrome Falcon used Negative IS due to intense anger and despair. Chiyuri is voiced by Aki Toyosaki in Japanese and Michelle T. Hseih in English.

=== Akira Himi ===
Also known as Aqua Current (アクア・カレント, Akua Karento), Akira Himi (氷見 あきら, Himi Akira) is a Burst Linker associated to the element of the water who works as a "bodyguard" tag match partner for players level 2 and under. Initially, her gender is unknown. After Haru accidentally trips over her bag, he as well as the customers in the dining area of their meeting place distinguish her as female. Her avatar on the non-accelerated network is a bespectacled weasel with a necktie. Her duel avatar is Aqua Current, a mass of water with a feminine form, possessing properties of pure water such as being an excellent insulator against electrical attacks. Aqua Current is endowed with great skill and experience, proving the rumors about her helping players with dangerously low Burst Point levels.

Aqua Current has been a Burst Linker for a long time, but refuses to level up in order to continue her work. Originally one of Nega Nebulus' "Elements", Aqua Current fell prey of a monster in the Unlimited Field, which also reduced her level to 1. Her whereabouts after the battle alongside Silver Crow are unknown, as is her real world identity after selectively erasing herself from Haru's memory with her Incarnate System ability. In volume 12, she saves Silver Crow from Argon Array and begins a duel with her, and subsequently rejoins Nega Nebulus full-time once her avatar is saved from the Unlimited Enemy Kill (UEK) caused by the God-class enemy Genbu. Aqua is voiced by Kana Ueda in Japanese and Trinity Lee in English.

=== Fuuko Kurasaki ===
Fuuko Kurasaki (倉崎 楓子, Kurasaki Fūko) is a retired Burst Linker known as Sky Raker (スカイ・レイカー, Sukai Reikā), associated with the element of wind. She is also the vice-commander of Nega Nebulus. Sky Raker is Ash Roller's "guardian" (the one who gave him Brain Burst) and the only person in Accel World he shows respect towards. Before Silver Crow existed she was known as "the person closest to the sky" in the Accelerated World, gaining the nicknames "Astro", "ICBM" and "Icarus". She became obsessed with the desire to fly and as a result was abandoned by her friends and "parent." Eventually, she gets the help of her only remaining friend and master Black Lotus to reach level 8. Having spent several level up bonus points trying to obtain the ability to fly, she eventually asks Black Lotus to cut off her avatar's legs to reduce her avatar's weight and increase her will. She is introduced to Silver Crow by Ash Roller in the Unlimited Neutral Field to help him control his willpower and use the Incarnate System to fly without his wings. After meeting her in the real world, Haru realizes she has mechanical prosthetic legs. Sky Raker later rejoins Nega Nebulus before the Hermes' Cord Vertical Race and regains her legs near the end of the race.

Her Brain Burst avatar appears as a silver-blue robot modeled after her real world self, lacking legs below the knee and using a wheelchair she powers through the Incarnate System. She keeps the wheelchair even after she regains her legs. Sky Raker is one of the only Brain Burst avatars that wears clothes, in her case a wide-brimmed summer hat and dress. Sky Raker owns an Enhanced Armament known as Gale Thruster, a rocket pack that, while not granting true flight, temporarily allows for incredibly long jumps and midair dashes. She lends the Gale Thruster to Haru to help him regain Silver Crow's wings. Later on, Silver Crow shows her that the Gale Thruster is for flying in space as wings become useless without air. Sky Raker is voiced by Aya Endo in Japanese and Johanna Luis in English.

=== Utai Shinomiya ===
A level 7 Burst Linker associated with the element of fire, Utai Shinomiya (四埜宮 謡, Shinomiya Utai) is a fourth grader attending Matsunoki Elementary. Her avatar, Ardor Maiden (アーダー・メイデン), has a Japanese priestess-like figure and has the ability to purify objects with parasitic attributes, she also possesses a powerful wide range Incarnate System ability, however it takes a long time to activate due to its complexity. Ardor Maiden is voiced by Yumi Hara in Japanese and Xanthe Huynh in English.

== Other legions and organizations ==
=== Prominence (Red Legion) ===
- Yuniko Kōzuki (上月 由仁子, Kōzuki Yuniko) is a Year-Five student with a fiery temper and intelligence that belies her age, "Niko", as she prefers to be called, is the second Red King after Red Rider's defeat. She is introduced when she breaks into Haru's house and tries to disguise herself as Tomoko Saitou (サイトウトモコ, Saitō Tomoko), Haru's second cousin. This plan fails when Haru looks through his grandfather's online photo albums and finds that Niko looks nothing like Tomoko. Niko was abandoned by her parents and attends a school for abandoned children. Niko displays tsundere qualities, one moment being very sweet and affectionate and the next angry and confrontational.

Her Brain Burst avatar is Scarlet Rain (スカーレット・レイン, Sukāretto Rein), a small red robot with the appearance of a young girl, armed with a laser pistol typically stored on the hip. She is the current Red King and her nickname is "The Immobile Fortress" thanks to her special ability, which summons her Enhanced Armament, a massive stationary artillery unit with which Scarlet Rain connects. Though unable to move and slow to turn, the artillery unit is outfitted with scores of weapons, giving it enough firepower to effortlessly take out legions of opponents from all directions. Scarlet Rain possesses two Incarnate System abilities: the Over Ray, a flamethrower attack, and the ability to teleport short distances. Yuniko Kozuki is voiced by Rina Hidaka in Japanese and Sarah Anne Williams in English.

- Blood Leopard (ブラッド・レパード, Buraddo Repādo) real name Mihaya Kakei (掛居 美早, Kakei Mihaya), the vice-commander of Prominence. She works as a waitress at a cake shop that also serves as a secret base for Prominence. She is usually seen wearing a maid outfit that she wears for work and rides a motorcycle. Leopard, as she prefers to be called, is cold, blunt, and distant, though she has a sarcastic sense of humor. Her Brain Burst avatar is level 6 and has the Shape Change ability which allows her to transform her avatar back and forth into a four-legged configuration, along "Vital Bite" that drains the life gauge of the enemy to replenish hers and "Mental Bite" which does so with the special gauge. Her non-accelerated avatar is an anthropomorphic red-furred leopard woman wearing a leather bodysuit. She develops a rivalry with Sky Raker for unknown reasons. She tends to speak in punctuated gaming terms, such as "K", "GJ" (Good job), and "NP" (No Problem). Blood Leopard is voiced by Ayako Kawasumi in Japanese and Erika Harlacher in English.
- Cherry Rook (チェリー・ルーク, Cherī Rūku), also known as the fifth Chrome Disaster, is a very close friend of Yuniko, becoming her "parent" after learning how much she loves video games. After being out-leveled by Yuniko and learning that he was moving out of town, he accepted the Disaster Armor Enhanced Armament from the Yellow King. He was defeated by Yuniko with the aid of Nega Nebulus using the Judgement Blow. His defeat passes the Disaster Armor to Silver Crow, causing him to eventually become the next Chrome Disaster. Cherry Rook is voiced by Mikako Takahashi in Japanese and Amanda C. Miller in English.
- Red Rider (レッド・ライダー, Reddo Raidā), was the original Red King, but was executed by Black Lotus before the events of the series. Red Rider had the ability to craft powerful weapons to use in combat, and it is implied that he had a romantic relationship with the Purple King, Purple Thorn. Rider was an advocate of continuing the peace treaty between the Kings, a mindset which led to Black Lotus beheading him with the "Death by Embracing" technique, which subsequently took all of his Burst Points and forcefully uninstalled the program, leading to Black Lotus' exile and setting into motion the events of the series. Red Rider is voiced by Kenjirō Tsuda in Japanese and Keith Silverstein in English.

=== Crypt Cosmic Circus (Yellow Legion) ===
- Yellow Radio (イエロー・レディオ, Ierō Redio), also known "Radioactive Disturber", serves as the Yellow King in the legion. After the fourth Chrome Disaster was defeated, he took the Disaster Armor and gave it to Cherry Rook expecting that he would be able to break the nonviolence treaty between the kings by giving him the "legal" right to eliminate one member from the Red legion, ultimately going after Scarlet Rain. His Brain Burst avatar appears as a court jester with long arms wielding a scepter as a weapon. His Brain Burst avatar's special ability is Futile Fortune Wheel, most likely an illusion attack. He uses illusions and trickery as the basis for his fighting style. Yellow Radio is voiced by Akira Ishida in Japanese and Vic Mignogna in English.
- Saxe Lauder (サックス・ローダー, Sakkusu Rōdā) is one of the Burst Linkers who participates in the ambush against Scarlet Rain in the Unlimited Neutral Field. Saxe is voiced by Hiroaki Tajiri in Japanese and Kyle Hebert in English.

=== Great Wall (Green Legion) ===
- Green Grandee (グリーン・グランデ, Gurīn Gurande) serves as the Green King in the legion. He specializes in absolute defense, which allows him to deal double the damage he receives from attackers earned him the title "Invincible". It is said he gained most of his Burst Points by hunting "enemies" in the Unlimited Neutral Field by himself. He exchanges Burst Points into item cards and distribute them to "enemies" for other players to hunt and pick up. He has only lost duels due to time out. He has witnessed the destruction of four generations of Chrome Disaster. His large shield is one of the Seven Arcs, 'gamma' The Strife. He is also one of the Originators and one of the few players who knows the existence of other accelerated worlds.
- Ash Roller (アッシュ・ローラー, Asshyu Rōrā), Silver Crow's first-ever opponent and Sky Raker's "child". Ash Roller is rude, vulgar, and highly aggressive, except when in Sky Raker's presence, where he adopts a highly respectful demeanor and often refers to her as "master". Despite being in the Green legion, he occasionally aids his master and rival; after Silver Crow had his wings stolen by Dusk Taker, Ash rallied him to not give up on Brain Burst and introduced him to Sky Raker out of the belief she could help him. Ash's motorcycle, an Enhanced Armament, is his primary weapon, means of transportation, and source of strength; without the bike, Ash Roller is effectively powerless.

Ash's real identity is Rin Kusakabe (日下部 綸, Kusakabe Rin), a girl who has had a crush on Haruyuki since being defeated in their second duel, confessing to him her identity and feelings when they first met in volume 9. The relationship between Rin and her duel avatar persona is complex; the neurolinker she has Brain Burst installed on belonged to her currently comatose brother Rinta, so his neurological data is imprinted on it, and Rin can only use it since she often was made to wear it as an infant. Thus, in the Accelerated World, Ash Roller is a separate entity formed from Rinta's hopes and fears instead of Rin's. While he is uncertain as to what he is exactly (a "ghost" or an extension of Rinta), Ash behaves like an over-protective brother, becoming violent towards Silver Crow whenever he perceives his rival to be flirting with Rin. Ash Roller is voiced by Kenichi Suzumura in Japanese and Ben Diskin in English.

- Graphite Edge (グラファイト・エッジ, Gurafaito Ejji) is a level 8 Burst Linker associated with the element of earth and a former member of Nega Nebulus. Nicknamed "Anomaly", or just "Graph" for short, he often displays a carefree personality and gives informal nicknames to his comrades. He is a swordsman-type avatar with the Enhanced Armament Twin Swords and his skills in close combat are equal or even superior to Black Lotus, to whom he taught her Incarnate attacks, despite his defenses being weak like his namesake. Graph has a lot of knowledge of the background of the Accelerated World, as well as the other "fallen" accelerated worlds Accel Assault 2038 and Cosmos Corrupt 2040, although he has not revealed how he came by this knowledge.

During the fall of the original Nega Nebulus, he became trapped in an unlimited enemy kill by one of the Castle's God-Class enemies, thus he could only appear in regular duels. He defected to serve under Green Grandee in exchange for sheltering the remaining survivors of Nega Nebulus. After this is discovered by his former legion members, it is also revealed that Graphite Edge somewhat escaped his UEK; though he managed to breach the castle's gate, his avatar is now confined to within the castle's walls, and that he is also the parent of the mysterious new burst linker Trilead Tetroxide/Azure Air.

- Iron Pound (アイアン・パウンド, Aian Paundo) is one of the Green Legion's executives, often acting as Green Grandee's spokesman. He first met Silver Crow after the latter had been mostly consumed by the Armor of Catastrophe and fought against him, being perplexed by his opponent's somewhat-remaining sense of self unlike previous wearer's of the Armor, and lost their duel. Pound showed Silver Crow no animosity after being confirmed to have been purified of the Armor, and suggested that he acquire the Theoretical Mirror ability to counter Metatron's laser attack.

Being what is known as a "perfect match" avatar, Pound is one of the few burst linkers whose avatar is designed to reflect their real-world skills, in his case, boxing. While this gives him the advantage of being able to apply his fighting skills perfectly, Pound finds it difficult to adjust to sudden melee attacks that defy standard boxing rules (such as being attacked from behind). In the film Infinite Burst, Iron Pound is voiced by Naoya Nosaka in Japanese and Austin Lee Matthews in English.

=== Leoniz (Blue Legion) ===
- Blue Knight (ブルー・ナイト, Burū Naito), also known as "Vanquisher", "Holy Sword" and "Legend Slayer", serves as the Blue King in the legion. His large sword is one of the Seven Arcs, 'alpha' The Impulse. Although he is Cyan Pile's original Legion Master, for some reason he decides to not apply the Judgement Blow on him when he joins Nega Nebulus. He was Red Rider's best friend and is also one of the Originators (one of the first players to have been given Brain Burst). Blue Knight is voiced by Takahiro Sakurai in Japanese and Kaiji Tang in English.
- Cobalt Blade (コバルト・ブレード, Kobaruto Burēdo) and Manganese Blade (マンガン・ブレード, Mangan Burēdo) are twin female Burst Linkers who are close aide of the Blue King, both level 7. Their duel avatars both have exceedingly similar female samurai warrior appearances; the most prominent difference between them are the so-called horns of their helmets, with Cobalt having "pigtails" and Manganese having a "ponytail". They are loyal to the Blue King and they both have a crush on him. In the past, Sky Raker once hung them from the top of the Tokyo Government Office, which humiliated them. Cobalt Blade is voiced by Misato Fukuen in Japanese and Amanda C. Miller in English., while Manganese Blade is voiced by Kanako Kondō in Japanese and Lauren Landa in English.

=== Auroral Oval (Purple Legion) ===
- Purple Thorn (パープル・ソーン, Pāpuru Sōn), also known as Empress Voltage, serves as the Purple King. She was Red Rider's lover. Her staff is one of the Seven Arcs, 'beta' The Tempest. Purple Thorn is voiced by Kaori Mizuhashi in Japanese and Jessica Straus in English.
- Aster Vine (アスター・ヴァイン, Asutā Vain) is a close aide of the Purple King. Little is known about her, although, as with many of the other executives of rival legions, she has an antagonistic relationship with Sky Raker.

=== Oscillatory Universe (White Legion) ===
- White Cosmos (ホワイト・コスモス, Howaito Kosumosu), also known as "Transient Eternity", serves as the White King in the legion and is the main antagonist of Accel World. Her real name is Enju Kuroba (黒羽 苑珠, Kuroba Enju). She is Kuroyukihime's older sister by one year in the real world and her "parent" in the Accelerated World. Her Brain Burst avatar possesses a recovery ability, one of only three in the history of Brain Burst with such a power. She also has the power to become fully invisible. She also possesses one of the Seven Arcs and is also one of the Originators. As the series progress, she is revealed to be the leader of the Acceleration Research Society. She is also the one who manipulated Black Lotus to behead Red Rider, which put a strain in their relationship.
- Ivory Tower (アイボリー・タワー, Aiborī Tawā) is the representative for White Cosmos during the meetings involving the Kings of each legion.

=== Acceleration Research Society ===
The Acceleration Research Society is a secret organization involved in using hacking and other underhanded tactics to obtain any advantage they can in the Brain Burst game. Its members include:

- Seiji Noumi (能美 征二, Nōmi Seiji)

A first year student at Umesato Junior High School, a Burst Linker (though he detests the term), and member of the Kendo Club who abuses the Physical Burst command to cheat. Seiji believes he is above other people and is disgusted by those he deems "lower" than himself to the point that he will clean his hands with a handkerchief if he touches someone. Seiji blackmails Haruyuki and Chiyuri and takes Silver Crow's wings in an attempt to force the two into becoming his "pets." He is eventually double-crossed by Chiyuri, who temporarily joins forces with him just to level up enough to perfect her abilities and return Silver Crow's wings. He lost the resulting sudden death fight and has Brain Burst forcefully uninstalled, taking his memories of having the program with it, thus proving Kuroyukihime's theory that Burst Linkers who have the program uninstalled also lose any memories of ever having the program. Much to Haruyuki and the others' surprise, Seiji becomes a kind person after he loses his memories from the game, forgetting not only all the harm he caused but all the suffering inflicted on him by his brother, who used to abuse him and force him to play Brain Burst in order to steal his Burst points to himself before Seiji defeated him for good by his own.
Seiji's Brain Burst avatar, Dusk Taker (ダスク・テイカー, Dasuku Teikā), appears as a featureless black humanoid with a large red orb in place of a face. His avatar was created from his desire to take everything back that his older brother Yuichi Noumi (能美 優一, Nōmi Yūichi) stole from him. Though lacking in significant combat ability on its own, Dusk Taker has an ability known as "Demonic Commandeer", the power to steal any finishing move, reinforced exterior, or ability from other Burst Linkers. This ability has no time limit, meaning Dusk Taker can possess up to three stolen abilities for as long as he desires. So long as Dusk Taker possesses an ability, the Burst Linker he took it from will be unable to use it. Using this ability, he has managed to incorporate body parts and weapons from other Burst Linkers into his own avatar, including a large scissor weapon on the right arm and a set of red tentacles replacing his left arm. Dusk Taker is also able to utilize the Incarnate System to create claws made of bright purple energy. Seiji is voiced by Sanae Kobayashi in Japanese and Amanda C. Miller in English.

- Rust Jigsaw (ラスト・ジグソー, Rasuto Jigusō) is a level 6 Burst Linker that lays traps to fend off melee type avatars while picking them off with long-range attacks and makes use of the Incarnate System to rust and corrode his targets. Like Dusk Taker, his name does not appear on the challenge list by using the now-banned Brain Implant Chip. Rust Jigsaw is voiced by Satoshi Hino in Japanese and Sean Chiplock in English.
- Sulfur Pot (サルファ・ポット, Sarufa Potto) is a Burst Linker who dives into Okinawa while being in Tokyo using a backdoor program. Sulfur Pot has the ability to tame enemies with his Enhanced Armament Mystical Reins, which he loses when he is defeated. The item winds up in the hands of Black Lotus, a gift from the Okinawan Burst Linkers. Like Dusk Taker, his name does not appear on the challenge list. Sulfur Pot is voiced by Nobuyuki Hiyama in Japanese and Derek Stephen Prince in English.
- Wolfram Cerberus (ウルフラム・サーベラス, Urufuramu Sāberasu) is a level 1 Burst Linker with at least three different personalities. He defeats Silver Crow in their first battle. He cooperated with the group to help with his other personalities. During the second battle, he lost due to Silver Crow figuring out his weakness. During the third battle, he overcame his mistakes, but Silver Crow's new move let him have the upper hand. When Argon Array interfered and trashed Ash Roller in the process, he defended Silver Crow; only to be knocked away by her. In volume 13, Cerberus was asked by Haru to meet with him in the real world. However, though he showed up, he ran off before speaking with Haru. In volume 15, despite having prepared himself to intentionally lose Brain Burst, he instead became the host for the Research Society's new Armor of Catastrophe Mark II, made from the negative will collected by the ISS Kit core and the boosters stolen from Scarlet Rain's Immobile Fortress.

His abilities change based on which of his personalities is active. When his second or the third personality activates, one of his shoulder armor pads opens and acts as the head. His first personality has the ability "Physical Immunity", which compresses his tungsten-hard armor to remove his weak points, preventing him from being harmed by melee attacks, though he remains vulnerable to throws. His second personality has the ability "Wolf Down" to bite the opponent and temporarily copy the abilities of the opponent in the process. His third personality is a copy of Dusk Taker (somehow resurrected from Brain Burst's Central Server) and has the same "Demonic Commandeer" ability. The Research Society seems to have some control over Cerberus's personalities, and were also able to briefly incorporate a copy of Orchid Oracle's personality and ability into the avatar.

- Black Vise (ブラック・バイス, Burakku Baisu) is a level 8 Burst Linker, one of the Originators, and the vice-commander of the Acceleration Research Society. He has the ability to hide in the shadows. Additionally, due to his Brain Implant Chip, Black Vise is able to decelerate, even while in the accelerated world. Essentially this enables him to dive into Brain Burst while still experiencing events in real-time as opposed to the slowed-down time Burst Linkers normally experience due to their accelerated senses. His avatar's body, made up of a series of black panels in a roughly humanoid shape, is able to separate panels to use as shields and offensive weapons. The color black is already used by Black Lotus so Black Vise is likely not the official name of the avatar, due to no two Avatars sharing the same color (hence why the second Red King is Scarlet rather than Red). Black Vise is voiced by Nobuo Tobita in Japanese and Matt Mercer in English.
- Argon Array (アルゴン・アレイ, Arugon Arei) is a level 8 Burst Linker, also known as "Quad Eyes Analyst". She has the ability to see the status of other avatars. She fires laser as her main attack and uses a flashlight to temporarily block the eyesight of other players.

=== Petit Paquet ===
One of the smaller legions in the Accelerated World, it consisted of a trio of girls who were in the same "Desert Lovers Club" before they later disbanded to join Nega Nebulus. Their members included:

- Shihoko Nago (奈胡 志帆子, Nago Shihoko), who is Petit Paquet's legion master, Chocolat Puppeter (ショコラ・パペッター, Shokora Papettā). Introduced in volume 12, she first encountered Silver Crow and Lime Bell when they were attempting to hunt down her tamed Enemy Coolu, before joining forces with them to fight off Magenta Scissor and her own ISS Kit-corrupted Legion comrades. Her armor has the appearance (and taste) of chocolate, which is considered ironic since Shihoko's real-world self is unable to eat chocolate. Her avatar's ability is to create a pool of chocolate, from which she can create "chocopets", puppet-like figures with which she can use to aid her in combat.
- Yume Yuruki (由留木 結芽, Yuruki Yume), duel avatar Plum Flipper (プラム・フリッパー, Puramu Furippā). She is Chocolat Puppeteer's "parent". She, alongside Mint Mitten, was forcibly parasitized with an ISS Kit by Magenta Scissor, until their battle Chocolat and the Nega Nebulus members Silver Crow and the Lime Bell, the latter of whom was able to remove the kits from Plum and Mint.
- Mito Satomi (三登 聖実, Satomi Mito), Chocolat's "child" and a somewhat mischievous person, as well as the owner of the duel avatar Mint Mitten (ミント・ミトン, Minto Miton). Her avatar possesses the Menthol Blow ability, which allows her to make her opponents feel cooler than they should, though it is inferior to proper ice-type attacks. Along with Plum Flipper, she was forcibly parasitized with an ISS Kit by Magenta Scissor, until their battle against Chocolat and the Nega Nebulus members Silver Crow and the Lime Bell, the latter of whom was able to remove the kits.

=== Other players ===
- Crimson Kingbolt (クリムゾン・キングボルト, Kurimuzon Kinguboruto) is a level 7 Burst Linker and former member of the Purple Legion. Crimson Kingbolt moved to Okinawa three years before the start of the series after his parents divorced. A freshman in high school, he is Lagoon Dolphin's "parent" and is "master" to both Lagoon Dolphin and Coral Merrow. He gives Lagoon Dolphin and Coral Merrow two rules: never use acceleration for selfish purposes and only talk about the Accelerated World to other Burst Linkers. His Brain Burst avatar resembles a bolt and has the ability to summon an Enhanced Armament giant robot known as "Mega-Machine Awakening", depending on the amount of metal, which is similar in size and power to Scarlet Rain's Enhanced Armament. He is a friend of Black Lotus, who refers to him as "Crikin." Purple Thorn once recruited him to join her legion (though she only recruited him for his name). Crimson Kingbolt is voiced by Tarusuke Shingaki in Japanese and Todd Stone in English.
- Ruka Asato (安里 琉花, Asato Ruka) is a second-year student at Kube Middle School. In the game, she is Lagoon Dolphin (ラグーン・ドルフィン, Ragūn Dorufin), a level 5 Burst Linker from Okinawa, Lagoon Dolphin is the "parent" of Coral Merrow and the "child" of Crimson Kingbolt. She has a tan and speaks with an Okinawan accent. Her Brain Burst avatar has a Shape Change ability, which she called it Marine Mode, adopting a form more suited for aquatic environments. Ruka Asato is voiced by Tamaki Nakanishi in Japanese and Christine Marie Cabanos in English.
- Mana Itosu (糸洲 真魚, Itosu Mana) is a first-year student from Kube Middle School. In the game, she is Coral Merrow (コーラル・メロウ, Kōraru Merou), a level 4 Burst Linker from Okinawa, Coral Merrow is the "child" of Lagoon Dolphin. Like Lagoon Dolphin, her Brain Burst avatar also has a Shape Change ability, which she also called it Marine Mode, she can take the appearance of a mermaid. Mana Itosu is voiced by Yūko Gibu in Japanese and Cristina Vee in English.
- Nickel Doll (ニッケル・ドール, Nikkeru Dōru) is one of the Burst Linkers Silver Crow battled against with Aqua Current. She uses the electric poles in her palms to control the flow of electric current. Voiced by: Harumi Sakurai
- Sand Duct (サンド・ダクト, Sando Dakuto) is Nickel Doll's partner. He uses the ducts in his hands to create a sandstorm vacuum. Sand Duct is voiced by Eiji Miyashita in Japanese and Kyle Hebert in English.
- Rui Odagiri (小田切 累, Odagiri Rui), also known as Magenta Scissor (マゼンタ・シザー, Mazenta Shisā). Formerly associated with the Acceleration Research Society, she was tasked with disseminating the ISS Kits throughout the Accelerated World. Being born with Gerstmann syndrome, Rui has difficulty distinguishing between her fingers and the left-right counterparts of her arms and legs, and has a hatred of items that function as "pairs", such as chopsticks, scissors, and shoes, which formed the basis for her duel avatar, which possesses twin swords that she can combine into a large scissor with a long-range cutting ability. Believing that not all avatars were equal and many had advantages over others which could be abused, as she witnessed happen to her comrade Avocado Avoider, she sought to spread the ISS Kits out of the belief that doing so would stabilize every avatars' power-balance.

Magenta Scissor was first mentioned in volume 7, in which she gave Cyan Pile an ISS Kit, and later appeared properly in volume 12, at which point she had begun forcibly parasitizing other avatars with the kits, such as Petit Paquet's Plum Flipper and Mint Mitten. After battling Silver Crow, she was defeated and decided to retreat, but allowed him to take a pair of ISS Kits for examination. She later encountered and fought against Nega Nebulus with her comrades, but when the Legend-class Enemy Metatron attacked both sides, she helped Silver Crow stand his ground long enough to redirect its laser attack. Having seen the lengths the Black Legion had gone through to overcome the Kits, Rui started to re-evaluate her perceptions, and was later convinced by Chocolat Puppeteer to join Nega Nebulus in order to help undo the damage caused by the ARS.

== Other characters ==
- Araya (荒谷, Araya) is a former student at Umesato Junior High School. He used to ridicule Haru by extorting his lunch until Kuroyukihime got him expelled. He retaliates by driving his car at both of them, though he only manages to injure Kuroyukihime due to her use of the Physical Full Burst command before he is arrested. Araya is voiced by Isshin Chiba in Japanese and Kyle Hebert in English.
- Megumi Wakamiya (若宮 恵, Wakamiya Megumi) is a student at Umesato Junior High School and Kuroyukihime's only true friend until she met Haru. She is the secretary of the student council and an ex-Burst Linker by the name of Orchid Oracle (オーキッド・オラクル, Ōkiddo Orakuru). However, when she lost the Brain Burst program, she also lost all memory of ever having it in the first place. She regains her memories temporarily during a school trip to Okinawa, helping Black Lotus and the Okinawan Burst Linkers defeat Sulfur Pot by utilizing her avatar's ability to change stage landscapes. She harbors a jealous grudge against Haru. Megumi is voiced by Haruka Tomatsu in Japanese and Amanda C. Miller in English.
- Saya Arita (有田 沙耶, Arita Saya) is Haruyuki's mother. She divorced Haruyuki's father a few years prior to the series' start and is often away on business trips, leaving Haru to fend for himself. It is hinted at that the turmoil in his family at the time of their divorce was what cause Haru to stress-eat, leading to his current overweight appearance. Saya is voiced by Mari Hagai in Japanese and Amanda C. Miller in English.
- Momoe Kurashima (倉嶋 百恵, Kurashima Momoe) is Chiyuri's mother. Whenever a legion meeting is held in Haruyuki's house, Chiyuri brings food which Momoe cooks for legion members.
