= Masako Jō =

Japanese voice actress

- 城 雅子
- Born: October 12, 1978 (age 47); Nagasaki Prefecture, Japan
- Occupation: Voice actress
- Years active: 1998–present
- Agent: 81 Produce

Masako Jō (城 雅子, Jō Masako; born October 12, 1978 in Nagasaki) is a Japanese voice actress affiliated with 81 Produce.

== Filmography ==
=== Anime ===
List of voice performances in anime
Year	Title	Role	Notes	Source
1999	Shukan Storyland ja:週刊ストーリーランド	Student		
2000	UFO Baby	Catherine		
2000	Saiyuki	Children		
2000	Hamtaro	Sparkle		
2000	Gravitation	Reporter		
2001	Salaryman Kintaro	Kazue Saeki, Ryuta Yajima		
2001	Star Ocean EX	Crew		
2001	Geneshaft	Alice, Luna		
2001	Noir	Lady tourist		
2001	Tantei Shounen Kagemen 探偵少年カゲマン	Chunchun		
2001	Mistin ja:カスミン	Student		
2002	Aquarian Age: Sign for Evolution	Kiriko Heguri		
2002–2006	MegaMan NT Warrior series	Roll.EXE, Haruka Hikari		
2002–2005	Mirmo!	Gabin		
2002	Pita Ten	Female student, housewife, bonsai, scary angel		
2002	Monkey Typhoon	Asobotto Shojo		
2002	Naruto	Boy		
2002	Galaxy Angel A	Memon, Miko no Rei, Hato		
2003	Zatch Bell!	Yoshiko		
2003	Croket!	Candy		
2003	Sonic X	Bokkun		
2003	Green Green	Schoolgirl		
2004	Daphne in the Brilliant Blue	Pao		
2004	Futari wa Pretty Cure	Yui Morioka		
2004	This Ugly Yet Beautiful World	Caster		
2004	とっとこハム太郎 はむはむぱらだいちゅ！	Sparkle		
2004	Hanaukyo Maid Tai La Verite	Mariel's teacher		
2004	The Marshmallow Times	Blanc		
2004	Agatha Christie's Great Detectives Poirot and Marple	Oliver		
2004	Uta Kata	Mother		
2004	Desert Punk	Daughter		
2004	Tactics	Shirotae		
2004	Genshiken	Shokudo's aunt		
2005	Magical Canan	Schoolgirl		
2005	Lime-iro Ryūkitan X	Shuro's mother		
2005	Ah! My Goddess	Chrono		
2005	Best Student Council	Koshi Kenma		
2005	Onegai My Melody	Bear		
2005	The Snow Queen	Johanna, Haru no Kimi no Ojo		
2006	Futari wa Precure Splash Star	Yuko Ota		
2006	ja:味楽る!ミミカ	Chorinrin, Oji Kako		
2006–2008	Kirarin Revolution	Erina Ogura		
2006	Onegai My Melody: KuruKuru Shuffle!	Bear		
2006	Powerpuff Girls Z	Soccer boy		
2006	D.Gray-man	Muramusume		
2007	Koi suru Tenshi Angelique	Lady		
2007	Gurren Lagann	Kumba		
2007	Hayate the Combat Butler	Erina		
2007	Onegai My Melody: Sukkiri	Bear		
2007	Zero Duel Masters	Octo		
2007	Mobile Suit Gundam 00	Allelujah (Young)		
2007	Shugo Chara!	Suzuki's grandmother, Tadayo's grandmother		
2007	Duel Masters Zero	Octo		
2007	Pururun! Shizuku-chan Aha	Saratoiru-sensei		
2007	Let's Go! Tamagotchi さぁイコー! たまごっち	Mei Dotchi, Usatchi	2007 TV series	
2008–2009	Major	Misaki	Seasons 4-5	
2008	Itazura na Kiss	Meg		
2008	Onegai My Melody: Kirara	Bear		
2008	To Love Ru	Ryouko Mikado		
2008	Duel Masters Cross	Batchan		
2008	Someday's Dreamers	An Kurihara		
2008	Clannad After Story	Mother		
2008	Linebarrels of Iron	Chisato Hayase		
2008	Shugo Chara Doki	Tadayo's grandmother		
2008	Inazuma Eleven	Ayumu Shaorin, Mai Tateno, Otsutoraria-en tera yuka		
2008	Mobile Suit Gundam 00 Second Season	Allelujah (Young)		
2009	Monoran Monoran ja:モノランモノラン	Suirin		
2009	Gokujō!! Mecha Mote Iinchō	Akane Ozawa		
2009	Jewelpet	Rald		
2009	Kobato.	Yoshio		
2009	Tamagotchi!	Tomatokatchi	2009 TV series	
2010	Duel Masters Cross Shock	Pixie		
2010	Motto To Love Ru	Ryouko Mikado		
2011	Inazuma Eleven GO	Gouenji Yuuka		
2011	Black Jack Final	Midori	OVA ep. 11	
2012	Kids on the Slope	Kaoru's mother, Yurika's aunt		

=== Film ===
List of voice performances in feature films
Year	Title	Role	Notes	Source
2006	Legend of Raoh: Chapter of Death in Love	Reina (shojo-ki)		
2007	Tamagotchi: The Movie	Temamatchi		

=== Video games ===
List of voice performances in video games
Year	Title	Role	Notes	Source
2001	Love Songs Idol Classmates ja:Love Songs アイドルがクラスメ〜ト	Alice Kagura	PS1/PS2	
2002	Hoshi no Mahoroba 星のまほろば	Uzume	PS1/PS2	
2002	Nijiiro Dodge Ball: Otome Tachi no Seishun	Suzune Nikaido	PS1/PS2	
2002	Unlimited Saga	Tiffon	PS1/PS2	
2003	Mega Man Network Transmission	Roll.EXE, Haruka Hikari		
2003	Atelier Viorate: Alchemist of Gramnad 2 ja:ヴィオラートのアトリエ ～グラムナートの錬金術士2～	Katarina Torakken	PS1/PS2	
2003	Korokke! 2 Yami no Banku to Ban-joou ja:コロッケ!2 闇のバンクとバン女王	Cabbage		
2003	Korokke! 3: Guranyuu Oukoku No Nazo ja:コロッケ!3 グラニュー王国の謎	Cabbage		
2004	Korokke! Ban-Ō no Kiki o Sukue	Cabbage, Vanilla	PS1/PS2	
2004	Simple 2000 series 63: Mogitate Mizugi! Onna Mamire no the Suiei Taikai	Alice Kagura	PS1/PS2	
2006	Tenshōgakuengekkōroku ja:転生學園月光録	Kana Mizumori	PS1/PS2	
2008	To Love-Ru Trouble: Waku Waku! Rinkangakkou-Hen	Mikado-sensei	DS	
2008	To Love-Ru Trouble: Doki Doki! Rinkaigakkou-Hen	Mikado-sensei	PSP	
2011	Atelier Viorate: Alchemist of Gramnad 2: Memories of Ultramarine ヴィオラートのアトリエ ～グラムナートの錬金術士2～ 群青の思い出	Katarina Torakken	PSP	
2015	Project X Zone 2	Ingrid	3DS	

=== Dubbing ===
List of dub performances in overseas productions
Title	Role	Voice dub for, Notes	Source
Crossroads	Lucy Wagner	Britney Spears	
Hardball	Watazu		
Momo	Bibi Girl		
The Ten Commandments	Eleazar		
Peppa Pig	George Pig		
Sheriff Callie's Wild West	Priscilla Skunk, Prairie Dogs		
