= Oriental Radio =

Japanese comedy duo

- Oriental Radio (オリエンタルラジオ)
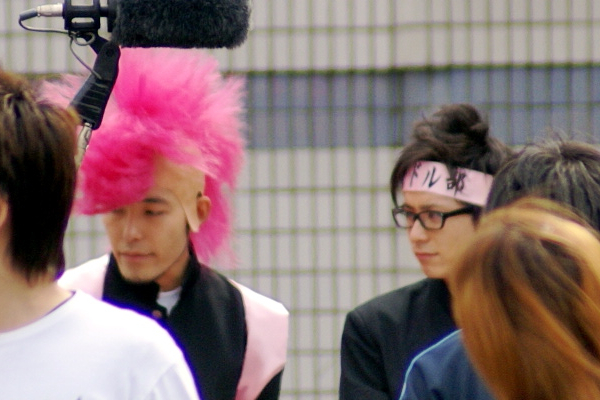
- Oriental Radio: Atsuhiko Nakata (left) and Shingo Fujimori
- Employer: Yoshimoto Kogyo

Comedy career
- Years active: 2005– (formed in Tokyo)
- Members: Shingo Fujimori (Tsukkomi); Atsuhiko Nakata (Boke)

Oriental Radio (オリエンタルラジオ), also known as Ori Raji (オリラジ), is a Japanese comedy duo consisting of Atsuhiko Nakata and Shingo Fujimori under the entertainment agency, Yoshimoto Kogyo.

Atsuhiko and Shingo met while working as part-time operators at a vehicle accident reception desk. While attending university, following Atsuhiko, Shingo followed and joined NSC. In April 2005, they debuted on their first television show, TBS Genseki. They became famous with their Buyūden act in 2006.

Oriental Radio made it into the semi-finals at the 2005 M-1 Grand Prix. Their entertainment agency didn't allow them to participate in the consolation match. They entered M-1 Grand Prix again in 2007, making it to the semi-finals again but lost. However, they were able to participate in the consolation match this time, but they didn't win to make it to the finals.

Oriental Radio were at one time regulars in Waratte Iitomo on Fridays.

They released their first DVD on March 12, 2008.

On December 23, 2015, they released a song "Perfect Human" under the name RADIO FISH. After the performance on the TV program "Engei Grand Slam", it went viral and peaked at No. 3 on Billboard Japan Hot 100 and No. 1 on Japanese iTunes chart. It also gained 71,291,995 views on YouTube.

== Members ==
- Atsuhiko Nakata (中田 敦彦, Nakata Atsuhiko), born September 27, 1982, in Takatsuki, Osaka
- Shingo Fujimori (藤森 慎吾, Fujimori Shingo), born March 17, 1983, in Suwa, Nagano

== Filmography ==
=== Movies ===
- Heidi (Voice only) - Atsuhiko as goat, Shingo as butler.
- The Wild (Voice only)
- TAXi4 (Voice only) - Atsuhiko as Daniel
- Tamagotchi: The Movie (Voice only) - Atsuhiko as Atchi, Shingo as Shingotchi
- Tsugaru 100 nen Shokudo - Atsuhiko as the founder of Ohmori Restaurant, Shingo as the fourth.
- Thomas & Friends: King of the Railway (Voice only) - Atsuhiko as Stephen, Shingo as Sir Robert Norramby
- Pretty Cure All Stars: Spring Carnival (Voice only) - Atsuhiko as Odoren, Shingo as Utaen
- Saber + Zenkaiger: Super Hero Senki (Voice only) - Shingo as Revice Equipment

=== Television ===
- Kamen Rider Saber (Voice only, Special Issue) - Shingo as Revice Equipment, Vistamps
- Kamen Rider Revice (Voice only) - Shingo as Chic, Revice/Live/Evil/Jeanne Equipment, Vistamps

== Discography ==
=== Singles ===
- STAR (2015)
- TONIGHT (2015)
- GOOD BYE (2015)
- SUMMER TIME (2015)
- PARADISE (2015)
- PERFECT HUMAN (2015)
- WONDERLAND (2016)

=== Albums ===
- PERFECT HUMAN (2016)

== Awards ==
- "Shine! 2005 Owarai Neta's Grand Prix" (輝け!2005年お笑いネタのグランプリ)
