= The Snow Queen (Japanese TV series) =

Japanese anime television series

雪の女王 ～THE SNOW QUEEN～ (Yuki no Joō ~Za Sunō Kuīn~)
- Anime television series
- Directed by: Osamu Dezaki
- Written by: Masashi Sogo
- Music by: Akira Senju
- Studio: TMS Entertainment
- Original network: NHK
- Original run: May 22, 2005 – February 12, 2006
- Episodes: 36

The Snow Queen (雪の女王 ～THE SNOW QUEEN～, Yuki no Joō ~Za Sunō Kuīn~) is an anime television series based on the 1844 children's story of the same name by Hans Christian Andersen. It is directed by Osamu Dezaki and animated by TMS Entertainment. The first episode aired on May 22, 2005, on Japan's NHK network.

== Plot ==
Gerda and Kai have been neighbors and best friends since childhood. Gerda is now eleven, Kai twelve. They were happy children who worked and played as they should. All that changed when the Snow Queen's mirror broke. The shards spread all through the world, each containing evil. If a shard went inside your eye, it would turn your heart to ice. A shard went into Kai's eye. After that, he grew cold to those he loved. One night, the Snow Queen came after him. She took him into her carriage and they went back to her ice castle at the farthest north point of the world. Everyone in Kai and Gerda's village didn't know where he went and believed he died from drowning in the frozen-over lake. Gerda doesn't believe this, for she dreamed of seeing Kai enter the carriage. When a drunk man admits that he also saw this, Gerda starts realizing that maybe what she saw wasn't a dream. She packs her things and goes on a journey to save Kai and bring him back home.

== Cast ==
- Tōru Nakamura - Narrator, Ragi the Bard
- Ayako Kawasumi - Gerda
- Rio Natsuki - Kai
- Mayo Suzukaze - Snow Queen
- Tetsuo Gotō - Red Troll
- Takuma Suzuki - Blue Troll
- Akio Ōtsuka - The Avatar of the Wind/The Devil
- Masahiro Takashima - Carl (Kai's Father)
- Noriko Hidaka - Nina (Kai's Mother)
- Masako Jō - Yohanne (Kai's Younger Sister)
- Junko Midori - Matilda (Gerda's Grandmother)

== Episodes ==
1. Geruda to Kai (ゲルダとカイ)
2. Ōrora no machi (オーロラの街)
3. Kyō no kake ra (鏡のかけら)
4. Tabidachi (旅立ち)
5. Hajimete no michi (はじめての道)
6. En dō mame to shōjo (えんどう豆と少女)
7. warui ō-sama (悪い王様)
8. Hanazono no mahōtsukai (花園の魔法使い)
9. Bara no yōsei (バラの妖精)
10. Kurausu no yume (クラウスの夢)
11. Akai kutsu (赤い靴)
12. Kōun no nashinoki (幸運の梨の木)
13. Shiroi basha (白い馬車)
14. Michizure (道づれ)
15. Hansu no chōsen (ハンスの挑戦)
16. Ginyūshijin Ragi (吟遊詩人ラギ)
17. Ano onna wa rokudenashi (あの女はろくでなし)
18. Kōri no umi e (氷の海へ)
19. Matchi uri no shōjo (マッチ売りの少女)
20. Kai e no tegami (カイへの手紙)
21. Mittsu no kurumi (3つのくるみ)
22. Sākasu no kiseki (サーカスの奇跡)
23. Paradaisu no en (パラダイスの園)
24. Tsukiyo no ningyo-hime (月夜の人魚姫)
25. Ō-ke no kagi (王家の鍵)
26. Horugā densetsu (ホルガー伝説)
27. Dai hyōga no kiki (大氷河の危機)
28. Fushigi na karasu (不思議なカラス)
29. Sanzoku no musume (山賊の娘)
30. Sanzoku no okite (山賊の掟)
31. Sanzoku no kizuna (山賊の絆)
32. Kenja to kaze zukai (賢者と風使い)
33. Kōri no shiro (氷の城)
34. Ragi no fukkatsu (ラギの復活)
35. Semaru maō (迫る魔王)
36. Kokyō e (故郷へ)

== Music ==
- Opening Theme:

"Snow Diamond" Composition and arrangement Akira Senju, Violin performance by Mariko Senju

- Ending Theme:

"Daisuki na kimi ni" (Towards You, My Beloved) by Kazumasa Oda

Music by Akira Senju
