= Jun Konno (voice actor) =

Japanese voice actor

- 金野 潤
- Born: October 18, 1975 (age 50); Chiba Prefecture, Japan
- Occupation: Voice actor
- Years active: 2006–present
- Agent: Production Baobab

Jun Konno (金野 潤, Konno Jun) born October 18, 1975, in Noda, Chiba, Japan is a Japanese voice actor.

== Voice roles ==
=== Anime ===
- Allison & Lillia as Air-traffic controller (ep 21); Audience (ep 8); Cabin crew B (ep 10); Chauffeur (ep 12); Ed (ep 23–26); Jan (ep 5–6,14,18-19); Maintenance chief (ep 7); Man B (ep 15–16); Pilot (ep 17); Radio voice (ep 13); Soldier (ep 11); Soldiers (ep 3); Subordinate (ep 4)
- Beyblade Burst God as Jango Matador
- Gintama as Private (Ep. 109); Shinsengumi Member C (Ep. 105)
- Hetalia - Axis Powers as Holy Roman Empire
- Inazuma Eleven as Asuka Domon, Usui, Tsutomu Gokuhi, Wataru Henmi, Shin'ichiro Toyama, Jin Kosaka, Seiya Yukino, Juzo Nata, Taisho Kakita, Ryota Tori, Kaiji Hamano, Ichiban Kita, Banda Koloogyu
- Linebarrels of Iron as Makoto Domyouji
- Macross Frontier as Congressman (ep 23); Keitai-kun (ep 1,4-5); Man (ep 3); Minister's secretary (ep 22); Mishima's subordinate (ep 8); New U.N. Spacy pilot (ep 17); Operator (ep 24); Pilot (ep 14); Radar person (ep 13); Reporter (ep 6); Reporter A (ep 9); Secretary (ep 10–11); SP (ep 20); Storekeeper (ep 18); Teacher (ep 16); Temjin (ep 12); Young man (ep 15,25)
- Mobile Suit Gundam 00 as Joshua Edwards (eps 14–15)
- Sengoku Basara: Samurai Kings series as Bunshichi
- To Love-Ru as Alien A (ep 17); Arts teacher (ep 3); Delinquent (ep 8); Ikemen-senpai (ep 20); Irogama (ep 11); Junior A (ep 12); Male student (ep 4,24); Man (ep 16); Math teacher (ep 18); Mauru; Pilot (ep 25); Reporter B (ep 19); Soccer player (ep 14); Student (ep 22); Subordinate (ep 7)
- Diabolik Lovers as Richter

=== Games ===
- Inazuma Eleven 2 (2009) as Asuka Domon
- Inazuma Eleven 3 (2010) as Asuka Domon
- Inazuma Eleven Strikers (2011) as Asuka Domon, Wataru Henmi, Gocker, Metron, Zagomel Zande
- Inazuma Eleven Strikers 2012 Xtreme (2011) as Asuka Domon, Wataru Henmi, Gocker, Metron, Zagomel Zande, Kaiji Hamano, Kai
- Inazuma Eleven GO (2011) as Kaiji Hamano, Ichiban Kita, Wanda Naoto, Shirosaki Katsuya, Oshii Tsuyoshi,
- Diabolik Lovers (2012) as Richter
- Inazuma Eleven GO 2: Chrono Stone (2012) as Kaiji Hamano
- Inazuma Eleven GO Strikers 2013 (2012) as Asuka Domon, Wataru Henmi, Gocker, Metron, Zagomel Zande, Kaiji Hamano, Kai, Ichiban Kita, Wanda Naoto, Rasetsu
- Super Robot Wars UX (2013) as Makoto Domyouji
- Inazuma Eleven GO: Galaxy (2013) as Funaki Hiromasa, Kaiji Hamano, Banda Koloogyu

=== Movies ===
- Stonewall as Ray/Ramona (Jonny Beauchamp)

=== Animation ===
- Iron Man: Armored Adventures as Iron Man

== See also ==
- Jun Konno at Anime News Network's encyclopedia
- Jun Konno at Jun Konno @ Production baobab
