= Tamagotchi: Happiest Story in the Universe! =

2008 film by Jōji Shimura

- Theatrical release poster
- Directed by: Jōji Shimura
- Written by: Aya Matsui
- Based on: Tamagotchi by Bandai
- Produced by: Katsunori Kubo
- Starring: Rie Kugimiya; Ryōka Yuzuki; Asami Yaguchi; Yūko Gibu; Junko Takeuchi; Satomi Kōrogi; Daisuke Sakaguchi
- Music by: Shirō Hamaguchi
- Production company: OLM
- Distributed by: Toho
- Release date: December 20, 2008
- Running time: 89 min (DVD version)
- Country: Japan
- Language: Japanese

Tamagotchi: Happiest Story in the Universe! (映画! たまごっち うちゅーいちハッピーな物語!?, Ēga! Tamagotchi Uchū Ichi Happy na Monogatari!?; lit. 'Film! Tamagotchi: Happiest Story in the Universe!') is a 2008 Japanese animated film produced by OLM's Team Kamei division, based on the Tamagotchi digital pet franchise jointly created by Bandai and WiZ. It is directed by Jōji Shimura and written by Aya Matsui, released into Japanese theaters on December 20, 2008, and on DVD on June 26, 2009.

The film is the second Tamagotchi feature film produced and the follow-up to Tamagotchi: The Movie. It is also a prequel to the 2009 Anime sequel of the same name.

An English dub of the film existed in the Philippines, although it was rather rare. The film was also rare in other countries. Madman Entertainment, who provided an English dub of Tamagotchi: The Movie, intended to dub this film in English as well, but the dub was cancelled for unknown reasons.

== Plot ==
The Magical Flying Library Ship arrives at Tamagotchi School. The students, including Mametchi and new student Kikitchi, board the ship, and all of them have magical adventures inside storybooks except Kikitchi, who appears sad.

Later, Mametchi comes up with a plan to share happiness with Kikitchi, which he leaves school the next day to work on. The project goes awry and it explodes in a cloud of pink smoke, but Mametchi creates a small, fluffy creature named Hapihapitchi who can absorb happiness and spread it to other Tamagotchis. Celebrating the creation of Hapihapitchi, Mametchi and friends see an ad for Celebria and decide to go there later.

Meanwhile, Kikitchi is home alone. He eats a meal by himself, watching a TV interview with his parents Monsieur KikiPapa and Madame Kiki, the creators of Celebria, feeling lonely.

Mametchi and Hapihapitchi become famous for using Hapihapitchi's powers to make everyone in Tamagotchi Town happy. While eating at McDonald's in Celebria, Mametchi and friends encounter Kikitchi, who is eating alone. They invite him to join them, but he runs away. They chase him and use Hapihapitchi's powers on him; however, he refuses to be forced to be happy. Mametchi realizes that the residents of Tamagotchi Town are now dependent on Hapihapitchi for happiness rather than solving their problems, and tells Hapihapitchi not to use her powers.

The Magical Flying Library Ship arrives at school again. Mametchi and Kikitchi enter a book called "The World's Happiest Story," about a man named Happy's unsuccessful quest to become the happiest man in the world by becoming rich. They try to help Happy, but he runs away. Kikitchi secretly takes the book home and enters it. Because the last page in the book is missing, the book has become unstable, and a paper tornado engulfs Celebria, turning people into two-dimensional paper figures. Mametchi and friends ride the Magical Flying Library Ship into the tornado and try to create new endings to Happy's story. They realize that being connected to others is the key to happiness, but Happy screams that he's never been connected to anyone. Hapihapitchi uses her powers to give him all the happiness in Tamagotchi Town, reminding him of happy memories of his dog Lucky. Mametchi's friends are able to create a new ending to the story where Happy and Lucky are reunited, which ends the paper tornado and restores Tamagotchi Town and its residents to normal. Hapihapitchi almost dies from using up all her happiness, but is revived when Happy picks her up and thanks her.

Mametchi, Kikitchi and friends return to Tamagotchi Town. Kikitchi's parents hug him and promise to spend more time with him.

== Cast ==
Character	Japanese Version
Mametchi	Rie Kugimiya
Chamametchi	Yūko Gibu
Memetchi	Ryōka Yuzuki
Kuchipatchi	Asami Yaguchi
Kikitchi	Junko Takeuchi
Hapihapitchi	Satomi Kōrogi
Happy	Daisuke Sakaguchi
