= Akiko Kawase (actress) =

Japanese voice actress (born 1980)

- 川瀬 晶子
- Born: June 29, 1980 (age 46); Tokyo, Japan
- Education: Keio University; Tokyo Announcement Academy
- Occupation: Voice actress
- Years active: 2003–present
- Agent: Aksent

Akiko Kawase (川瀬 晶子, Kawase Akiko; born June 29, 1980) is a Japanese voice actress. Her major roles include Humiko Honma in Black Jack, Miyabi Tsukuyomi in Koi Koi Seven, and Aoi Mishina in Ryusei Sentai Mustumet. She voices Plusle in the Pokémon series.

== Filmography ==
=== Anime ===
List of voice performances in anime
Year	Series	Role	Notes	Source
2003	Dear Boys	Mai Moritaka		
2003	Astro Boy	Yuko Kisaragi		
2003	Stellvia			
2003	Pokémon: Jirachi Wish Maker	Plusle		
2003–04	Pokémon: Advanced Generation series	Andrew, Plusle		
2003	Tokyo Godfathers			
2003–04	Black Jack	Kumiko Honma		
2004	Daphne in the Brilliant Blue		Ep.1	
2004–06	Kaiketsu Zorori			
2004	Aishiteruze Baby	Nattsu		
2004	Meteor Squadron Musumet	Aoi Mishina		
2004	Pokémon: Destiny Deoxys	Plusle	feature film	
2004	Pikachu's Summer Festival	Plusle	short film shown on ANA flights	
2005	Sukisho			
2005	Koi Koi Seven	Miyabi Tsukuyomi		
2005	Amaenaideyo			
2005	Strawberry 100%			
2005	Paradise Kiss	Hamada-sensei		
2005	Case Closed	Various characters		
2005–06	Rozen Maiden Träumend	Micchan, Mitsu Kusabue		
2005	Black Cat			
2005	IGPX			
2005	Black Jack movie	Kumiko Honma		
2006	Majime ni Fumajime Kaiketsu Zorori			
2006	The Third	Greta		
2006	Black Jack 21	Kumiko Honma, Mio (young)		
2006	Coyote Ragtime Show	July		
2007	Tamagotchi: The Movie	Mamapatchi	film	
2007	Mokke	Fujitani-sensei		
2010	Working!!	Maya Matsumoto		
2011	Little Battlers Experience	Saki Kirino		
2012	Space Brothers	Yuki Makabe		
2014	Rage of Bahamut: Genesis	Various characters		

=== Video games ===
List of voice performances in video games
Year	Series	Role	Notes	Source
2003	Dear Boys	Konami Moritaka	PS2	
2004	Stellvia		PS2, Bandai	
2004	Astro Boy	Yuko Kirisagi	PS2	
2004	F Fanatic	Karen Wilson	PrincessSoft game, PS2, PC	
2006	Parfait ~Chocolat Second Style~ (ja:パルフェ 〜ショコラ second brew〜)	Akira Hasegawa	PS2	

=== Overseas dubbing ===
List of voice performances in overseas dubbing
Series	Role	Notes	Source
Models of the Runway	Lorena, Megan	Season 2	
The Greatest Love	Ha Rumi, En Jong	South Korean live-action series	
Pandalian	Love	Taiwanese cartoon	

== Discography ==
- Ai no Senko (愛の閃光) – Meteor Squadron Musumet opening theme
- Super Love – Koi Koi Seven opening theme
- Ai no Hane(愛の羽根) – Koi Koi Seven character song
