= Tamagotchi: The Movie =

2007 film by Jōji Shimura

- Theatrical release poster
- Directed by: Jōji Shimura
- Written by: Aya Matsui
- Based on: Tamagotchi by Bandai
- Produced by: Osamu Kamei, Michiru Katô, Kazumi Kawashiro, Katsunori Kubo, Kaoru Kurisaki, Hideyuki Nagai, Toshisato Okuno, Yoshinari Toriya, Akihiro Yokoi
- Starring: Rie Kugimiya; Noriko Shitaya; Ryōka Yuzuki; Asami Yaguchi; Yūko Gibu
- Edited by: Toshio Henmi
- Music by: Kohei Tanaka
- Production company: OLM, Inc.
- Distributed by: Toho
- Release date: December 15, 2007 (Japan)
- Running time: 88 minutes(DVD version)
- Country: Japan
- Language: Japanese
- Box office: $6,784,907

Tamagotchi: The Movie (えいがでとーじょー! たまごっち ドキドキ! うちゅーのまいごっち!?, "Appearing on Film! Tamagotchi: Heart-Throbbing! Lost Child In Space!?") is a 2007 Japanese animated film produced by OLM's Team Kamei division. It is the first Tamagotchi feature film ever officially produced, based on the digital pet franchise jointly created by Bandai and WiZ. It is directed by Jōji Shimura (who also worked on Pokémon) and written by Aya Matsui (who also worked on Boys Over Flowers) and was released in theaters by Toho on December 15, 2007, and on DVD on July 23, 2008, in Japan.

The movie was dubbed & released by Madman Entertainment on June 1, 2009, in English in both Australia and the United Kingdom. It is followed by a sequel, Tamagotchi: Happiest Story in the Universe!.

== Plot ==
On Tamagotchi Planet, Mametchi had just finished his latest invention: the "Transporter Machine". At the same time, on Earth, a young girl named Tampopo goes off to deliver a forgotten item to her mother who is having a baby. Mametchi's best friends, Memetchi and Kuchipatchi arrive at Mametchi's house just in time to see Mametchi try out his new invention. Several events result in the aim of the Forwarding Machine to go off course, and Tampopo is brought to Tamagotchi Planet.

The next day, Tampopo goes to school to learn with Mametchi, Memetchi, Kuchipatchi, and the Tamagotchi children. During science class, an explosion engulfs the room into smoke and darkness. Almost everyone is fine, but Mametchi crouches on the floor in fear. Later at a restaurant, Mametchi explains that he has been afraid of the dark ever since he got trapped in a hole when he was a young child. He fears he will be an embarrassment to his little sibling. Mametchi built the Transporter Machine to bring himself his own private sun to give him a light that won't go out. Mametchi vows to begin experiments to make a little sun for himself.

One day, Mametchi and Tampopo stay home. PapaMametchi gives Tanpopo a key that will take her back to the time when she was forwarded to Tamagotchi Planet. After several more events, an egg bounds out of the window, rolls down the street, and eventually falls into a bundle of balloons that end up caught on the top of a high tower. Soon all of Tamagotchi Planet is watching Mametchi try to save the egg. Mametchi, Tampopo, and Memetchi are all trying to save Mametchi's younger sibling, and KuroMametchi saves all three of them, using Kuchipatchi as a trampoline.

Soon, the egg hatches into Mametchi's sister, ChaMametchi. A montage of events follow, as ChaMametchi grows to kindergarten age, while Mametchi finally succeeds in creating "MameSunnytchi", a little sun that will follow Mametchi everywhere and always provide him with light. The real Tamagotchi Planet sun, Sunnitchi, witnesses this. Soon after, the rocket for Tampopo is complete. Mametchi says he wants Tampopo to stay for the birthday celebrations for the King, and both Tanpopo and Mametchi's parents agree.

The next morning, it is dark outside. Sunnitchi is nowhere to be found, and thus Tamagotchi Planet has no light. Mametchi and the others find this odd, but go to school anyway. During the birthday preparations, a sneezing sound is heard, and the Tamagotchi Planet inhabitants are violently thrown into the air. It is soon discovered that Tamagotchi Planet caught a cold due to having no heat. Mametchi and Tanpopo overhear the Principal of Tamagotchi School explaining that Sunnitchi left a goodbye note, apparently because Mametchi created a new sun. Mametchi takes this to mean that the whole situation was his fault.

That night, Mametchi sneaks out of the house with MameSunnytchi and enters the completed rocket. Suddenly, Tanpopo, Memetchi, and Kuchipatchi appear, eager to help. They give Mametchi the manual, and he is able to start up the rocket. ChaMametchi sneaks aboard at the last minute, and they are forced to take her with them. As the passengers enter space, PapaMametchi, Memetchi, and Kuchipatchi's parents appear on the video screen and demand that they return. When Mametchi tells PapaMametchi about how he is taking responsibility for his mistakes, PapaMametchi reluctantly agrees. The scientists had developed medicine for the Tamagotchi Planet, and the pill was mounted on top of the rocket. They have only one medicine capsule, and only one chance of administering it. Before Mametchi can fire the pill, ChaMametchi jumps into his lap at the last moment, dislocating the rocket's trajectory. Though it appears they have failed at curing Tamagotchi planet, Tamagotchi World is able to absorb it with its runny nose.

At this point, Mametchi is about to go in search of Sunnitchi, but the rocket is sent spiraling away, and outside of radio contact. Mametchi finally reaches the breaking point when ChaMametchi asks to talk to PapaMametchi, yelling at her for if she hadn't performed her rendezvous with Star Command, they wouldn't be lost in the infinity and beyond. This results in ChaMametchi starting to cry. Tanpopo tells Mametchi he was a little too hard on ChaMametchi, and takes ChaMametchi into another room to comfort her. Mametchi and the others join Tanpopo and ChaMametchi for several minutes, where Mametchi and ChaMametchi make up, and Tanpopo now knows what is in store for her when her younger sibling is born and is no longer afraid of the responsibility of being an older sibling.

Suddenly, the ship shakes violently, and they return to the command center to find that there are all sorts of objects flying towards them. They suddenly realize that they are drifting towards a black hole, and Mametchi is stricken with fear. Mametchi attempts to fire the rocket, but the ship cannot escape the pull of the black hole. Suddenly, communications with the Tamagotchi Planet are restored. One of the scientists, Professor Mametchi notices that the black hole is actually a Tamagotchi named Blackholetchi. The only way to save the passengers is to wake Blackholetchi up. Mametchi activates the loudspeaker and everyone on the ship screams out, trying and awaken Blackholetchi. A meteoroid slams into the ship and blocks the loudspeaker nullifying their efforts.

In desperation, Mametchi and Tanpopo put on spacesuits and try to dislodge the meteoroid. With the meteoroid dislodged, Memetchi, Kuchipatchi, and ChaMametchi start shouting at Blackholetchi again. Soon, all of the people on Tamagotchi Planet join in. Mametchi is finally able to overcome his fear of the dark, and joins in the call to awaken Blackholetchi. However, the wire snaps, sending Mametchi and Tanpopo into Blackholetchi. ChaMametchi starts screaming for Blackholetchi to wake up once more, and soon Tamagotchi Planet itself makes a loud cry. This finally reaches Blackholetchi, who awakes from his slumber. Mametchi is heard calling out from within Blackholetchi, and the universe's largest Tamagotchi apologizes and returns them to the ship.

Communications are once again cut off; PapaMametchi noted that the rocket has used up all of its fuel, and there is no way for the rocket's passengers to return. Just a few moments later, Mametchi's connection is restored, and the passengers have returned home. Sunnitchi, brought them all back to Tamagotchi Planet. Sunnitchi explains that he just left to go on a hot springs tour. The celebration for the King's birthday begins, and there is a parade through Tamatown. Halfway through, PapaMametchi and Mamametchi find Tanpopo and tell her that Cometchi is about to fly by Tamagotchi Planet, and is willing to take Tanpopo back to Earth.

Tanpopo, Mametchi and his family, Memetchi, and Kuchipatchi quickly go to the meadow to meet Cometchi. Tanpopo finally opens up the bag that she was supposed to be taking to her mother, and sees it is the dress that she had worn when she was a newborn. ChaMametchi cries that she does not want Tanpopo to go, and a tearful farewell follows, with the Tamagotchis promising to never forget her. Tanpopo is back at her desk in her room, at the exact time before she was forwarded to Tamagotchi Planet. She wonders if it was all a dream, until she sees the key she was given. Just then, her mother calls, and Tanpopo tells her she is about to deliver her bag.

Months later, Tanpopo receives a letter in her Tamagotchi from Mametchi and ChaMametchi. Tanpopo sends back a letter in her mind, saying that her baby brother is selfish, but has a kind heart.

== Cast ==
| Character | Japanese Version | English version |
|---|---|---|
| Tanpopo | Noriko Shitaya | Megan Harvey |
| Mametchi | Rie Kugimiya | Stephanie Sheh |
| Memetchi | Ryōka Yuzuki | Stephanie Sheh |
| Kuchipatchi | Asami Yaguchi | Carrie Keranen |
| ChaMametchi | Yūko Gibu | Michelle Laikowski |
| Papamametchi | Tokuyoshi Kawashima | Ted Lewis |
| Mamametchi | Yoshino Takamori | Veronica Taylor |
| Flowertchi | Hinako Sasaki | Veronica Taylor |
| KuroMametchi | Nanae Katō | Johnny Yong Bosch |
| Makiko | Kazuko Sugiyama | Kether Donohue |
| Ciaotchi | Nana Takano | Erica Schroeder |
| Young Mametchi | Natsuki Yoshihara | Stephanie Sheh |
| Ringotchi | AKIKO (Akiko Kikuchi) | Eileen Stevens |
| Togetchi | Jun Konno | Veronica Taylor |
| Ms. Perfect | Kurumi Mamiya | Carrie Keranen |
| Reportchi | Aiko Kaitō | Erica Schroeder |
| Shingotchi | Oriental Radio | Jamie McGonnigal |
| Atchi | Atsuhiko Nakata | Wayne Grayson |
| Mr. Turtlepedia | Naoki Tatsuta | Ted Lewis |
| MamaPatchi | Akiko Kawase | Erica Schroeder |
| MemeMamatchi | Masako Jō | Rebecca Soler |
| MameSunnytchi | Miyu Ōtake | Alissa Brodsky |
| Bagubagutchi | Hinako Sasaki | Carrie Keranen |
| Monkeytchi | Yuri Naoi | Marc Thompson |

== Box office ==
The film grossed $6,784,907 at the Japanese box office, as of January 20, 2008.
