= Tamagotchi! =

2009 Japanese anime series

- Cover of the first volume of the DVD release by Bandai Visual, showing the main protagonist Mametchi

たまごっち!
- Genre: Comedy
- Created by: Bandai; Wiz
- Anime television series
- Directed by: Jōji Shimura
- Produced by: Noriko Kobayashi; Katsunori Kubo; Makoto Hijikata; Risa Nakamura
- Written by: Aya Matsui
- Music by: Aozora
- Studio: OLM Team Kamei
- Original network: TXN (TV Tokyo)
- English network: AU: GO!; (2010-2014)
- Original run: 12 October 2009 – 3 September 2012
- Episodes: 143
- Manga

Go Go♪ Tamagotchi!
- Written by: Yasukon
- Published by: Shogakukan
- Magazine: Pucchigumi
- Original run: February 2010 – December 2011
- Volumes: 3
- Light novel
- Written by: Bandai; Wiz; Aya Matsui; Anna Mari
- Published by: Kadokawa Shoten
- Imprint: Kadokawa Tsubasa Bunko
- Original run: 11 March 2011 – February 2012
- Volumes: 10
- Anime television series

Tamagotchi! Yume Kira Dream
- Directed by: Jōji Shimura
- Written by: Aya Matsui
- Music by: Aozora
- Studio: OLM Team Kamei
- Original network: TXN (TV Tokyo)
- Original run: 10 September 2012 – 29 August 2013
- Episodes: 49
- Manga

Go Go Tamagotchi! Dream
- Written by: Yasukon
- Published by: Shogakukan
- Magazine: Pucchigumi
- Original run: May 2013 – July 2013
- Volumes: 1
- Anime television series

Tamagotchi! Miracle Friends
- Directed by: Jōji Shimura
- Written by: Aya Matsui
- Music by: Aozora
- Studio: OLM Team Wasaki
- Original network: TXN (TV Tokyo)
- Original run: 5 September 2013 – 27 March 2014
- Episodes: 29
- Anime television series

Go-Go Tamagotchi!
- Directed by: Jōji Shimura
- Written by: Aya Matsui
- Music by: Aozora
- Studio: OLM Team Wasaki
- Original network: TXN (TV Tokyo)
- Original run: 3 April 2014 – 26 March 2015
- Episodes: 50
- Anime television series

Tamagotchi! Tama Tomo Daishū Go!
- Directed by: Jōji Shimura
- Written by: Aya Matsui
- Music by: Aozora
- Studio: OLM Team Wasaki
- Original network: TXN (TV Tokyo)
- Original run: 2 April 2015 – 29 September 2015
- Episodes: 26
- Anime film

Eiga Tamagotchi: Himitsu no Otodake Daisakusen!
- Directed by: Jōji Shimura
- Written by: Hiroshi Yamaguchi
- Studio: OLM Team Yoshioka
- Released: 28 April 2017
- Runtime: approx. 10 minutes

Tamagotchi! (たまごっち!) is a Japanese anime series produced by OLM's Team Kamei division, officially based on the Tamagotchi digital pet jointly created by Bandai and WiZ. It is directed by Jōji Shimura (Pokémon) and written by Aya Matsui (Boys Over Flowers), with character designs done by Sayuri Ichiishi, Shōji Yasukazu, and Miwa Sakai. The anime officially aired on TV Tokyo and other affiliate stations in Japan from 12 October 2009 to 3 September 2012, lasting for seven seasons.

A follow-up to the film Tamagotchi: Happiest Story in the Universe!, this is the third Tamagotchi anime produced since Saa Ikō! Tamagotchi. After the series' airing, it has gained three anime sequels, two manga adaptations and ten light novel adaptations by Kadokawa Shoten. Although several episodes of the first Tamagotchi anime have been dubbed in select countries, the full anime has never aired outside of Japan. The series ended in March 2015 and was replaced by Kamisama Minarai: Himitsu no Cocotama on its initial timeslot.

== Story arcs ==
The anime is divided into three official arcs, the Tamagotchi Town Chapter for the first series, the Dream Town Chapter for the 2nd series and the Tamagottsun Chapter for the 3rd series. Alongside the main story, several mini-segments were officially shown throughout the anime, with each segment differs from season to season.

Tamagotchi Town Chapter (たまごっちタウン編, Tamagotchi taun-hen) (Eps 1–143)

The first chapter of the series which consists of three official arcs, the Lovely Tama-Friends Arc (ラブリーたまとも編, Raburī Tama-Tomo-hen), focusing on Lovelitchi and her double life as Lovelin, the Happy Harmony Arc (ハッピーハーモニー編, Happī Hāmonī-hen), which focuses on the friendship between Lovelitchi and Meloditchi and the Collecting Tama Hearts Arc (コレクトたまハート編, Korekuto Tama Hāto-hen) which focuses on the legend of the Tama Hearts.

Dream Town Chapter (ドリームタウン編, Dorīmu taun-hen) (Eps 144–221)

The second chapter of the series consisting of the Yume Kira Arc (Tamagotchi! Yume Kira Dream), focusing on Yumemitchi and Kiraritchi's dream on becoming idols and the Dreambakutchi Arc (Tamagotchi! Miracle Friends) which focuses on Miraitchi and Clulutchi's desire on returning to the future.

Tamagottsun Chapter (Eps 222–271)

The third chapter focusing on meeting and reunion of the characters from the past series, as well as two new characters, Neenetchi and Orenetchi. It focuses more on the interaction between friends of both towns.

== Plot ==
=== Tamagotchi! ===
Following the events of Tamagotchi: Happiest Story in the Universe!, Mametchi, Memetchi, Kuchipatchi, and all other Tamagotchi Planet residents move on with their daily lives. However, a famous Tamagotchi idol named Lovelin moves to Tamagotchi Town to host a footrace. The following day, she transfers to Tamagotchi School as "Lovelitchi", as she keeps her Lovelin identity a secret. After Mametchi tells Lovelitchi he sees her as a Tama-Friend, she soon gets nervous because Tama-Friends are honest with each other. On Mametchi's birthday, Lovelitchi announced that she was Lovelin, prompting others to forgive her. Daily life continued until a legend about "The Kuchipatchi of Truth" was learned about by Mametchi, Memetchi, and Kuchipatchi.

=== Tamagotchi! Yume Kira Dream ===
Following Ms. Perfect's announcement, Mametchi, Memetchi, and Kuchipatchi travel to Dream Town by plane. They stay with an elder Tamagotchi named Ikaritchi. Meanwhile, in a different context, Yumemitchi – the daughter of a wealthy Tamagotchi family – meets her best Tama-Friend, Kiraritchi, and they become famous idols, which was inspired by a duet called D2.

=== Tamagotchi! Miracle Friends ===
Sometime after Yumemitchi and Kiraritchi pursuit their dream at a new destination, twin sisters in Dream Town of the Future appear. Miraitchi, the older twin, is more sarcastic; while Clulutchi, the younger twin, is more serious. One day, a mysterious character named X-Kamen lets loose eight mythical Tama-Pets called Dreambakutchi. The father, Doctor Future, orders them to go retrieve the pets. Miraitchi and Clulutchi use devices that provide outfits necessary for fulfilling tasks and assignments to give Miraitchi wings and Clulutchi a hoverboard. Miraitchi enjoyed flying but Clulutchi is afraid it. Despite different receptions on taking to the skies, the twins retrieve most of the Dreambakutchi. However, Purplebakutchi, the only one still flying, does something which causes Watchlin, the living watch owned by the twins, to malfunction and send everyone back in time.

At that time frame, Mametchi, Memetchi, Kuchipatchi, Pianitchi and Coffretchi were doing homework. That evening, the twins visited Music Cafe and were welcomed by Mametchi and Pianitchi. Miraitchi and Clulutchi made a request for Mametchi and Tama-Friends to assist them in getting back the Dreambakutchis so they can go back home, to which all five Tamagotchis agreed.

=== Go-Go Tamagotchi! ===
Every millennium on Tamagotchi Planet, continents collide in an event called the Tamagottssun, causing Tamagotchi Town and Dream Town to fuse as "DoriTama Town", and characters, excluding Smartotchi, are reunited. They learn about the legends of the Tamagottssun.

== Development ==
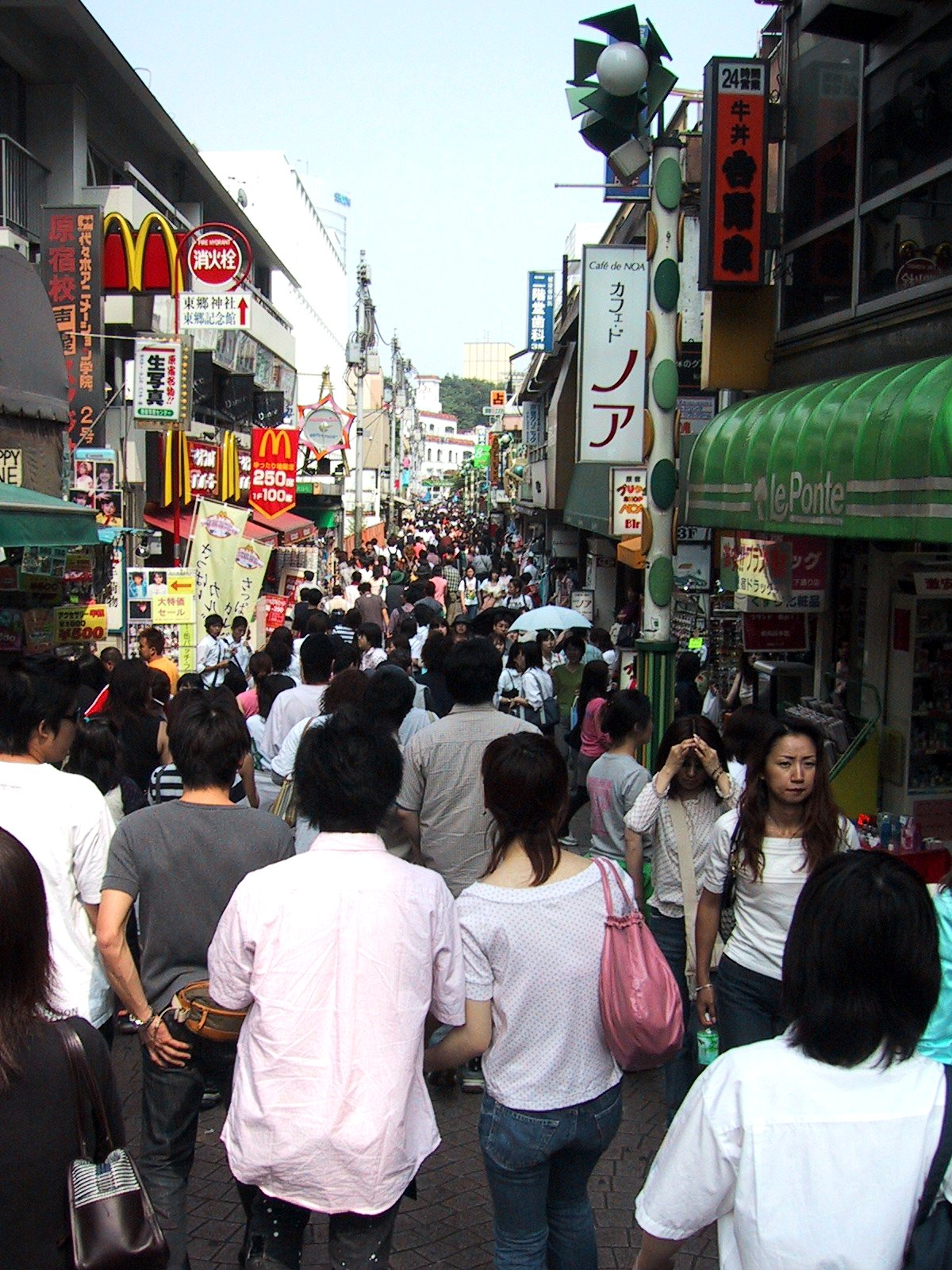
The Takeshita street in Harajuku, Tokyo, where one of the anime's notable locations were based on

Beginning with Episode 144 in 2012, Team Kamei went on to develop the second series Tamagotchi! Yume Kira Dream (たまごっち！ゆめキラドリーム, Tamagotchi! Yume Kira Dorīmu), focusing on the three main characters studying abroad in Dream Town and the lives of both Yumemitchi and Kiraritchi who dream of becoming idols one day. The second series aired from 10 September 2012 to 29 August 2013. From November 2013 to December 2014, Bandai America divided and dubbed the first seven episodes of Yume Kira Dream as a series of 14 webisodes for the Tamagotchi Friends website. In 2013, Team Wasaki replaced Team Kamei on the anime's production to produce the third series Tamagotchi! Miracle Friends (たまごっち！みらくるフレンズ, Tamagotchi! Mirakuru Furenzu), that aired from 5 September 2013 to 27 March 2014 starting with Episode 193. It focuses on the twins Miraritchi and Clulutchi who must search for the Dreambakutchis for them to return to the future.

In 2014, the fourth anime series, Go-Go Tamagotchi! (GO-GO たまごっち！), was produced, revolving around the reunion between characters from Tamagotchi and Dream Town after the Tamagottsun event, combining them into DoriTama Town. The anime premiered on 3 April beginning with Episode 222.

== Media ==
Tamagotchi! Miracle Friends (たまごっち! みらくるフレンズ, Tamagotchi! Mirakuru Furenzu), aired from 5 September 2013 to 27 March 2014 with a total of 29 episodes, making it the shortest Tamagotchi season ever released. The fourth and final series, Go-Go Tamagotchi! (GO-GO たまごっち！), premiered on 3 April 2014 and ended on 26 March 2015.

After all four of the anime series ended, reruns of both Tamagotchi! Yume Kira Dream and Go-Go Tamagotchi! continued to air on Animax in a series called Tamagotchi! Tama Tomo Daishū Go! that ran from 2 April to 29 September 2015 and featured live-action segments.
