= Tamagotchi Connection: Corner Shop =

2005 video game

- European cover art of Tamagotchi Connection: Corner Shop. From left to right featuring Memetchi, Mametchi, and Kuchipatchi, with more to come.
- Developer: NanaOn-Sha
- Publishers: WW: Bandai; AU: Atari
- Producers: Masaya Matsuura; Sanae Honma
- Composer: Masaya Matsuura
- Series: Tamagotchi
- Platform: Nintendo DS
- Release: JP: September 15, 2005; NA: January 31, 2006; EU: June 16, 2006; AU: June 16, 2006
- Genres: Minigame collection, Life simulator game
- Mode: Single-player

Tamagotchi Connection: Corner Shop (Note: Japanese: たまごっちのプチプチおみせっち, Hepburn: Tamagocchi no Puchi Puchi Omisecchi) is a shop simulator video game developed by NanaOn-Sha and published by Bandai and Atari for the Nintendo DS. Based on the Tamagotchi virtual pet, the game tasks the player with running stores with their chosen partner Tamagotchi, and serving customers by playing store-dependent minigames. The game released in Japan in 2005 and worldwide in 2006. In Europe and Australia, the game was titled Tamagotchi Connexion: Corner Shop.

The game was developed by NanaOn-Sha, who had previously collaborated with Bandai. The idea for a shop-simulation game came from the then-commonly held aspiration of Japanese girls to become shopkeepers.

The game received mixed reviews from critics, who praised the game's presentation but criticized the repetitiveness of the gameplay loop. Corner Shop sold 1.51 million copies worldwide, making it the 61st best-selling Nintendo DS games of all time. It was the first third-party DS game to sell one million units.

Tamagotchi Connection: Corner Shop spawned the Corner Shop series, which includes nine games to date. It was subsequently followed by Tamagotchi Connection: Corner Shop 2 in 2006, and also received a Japan-only remake on the 3DS in 2012.

== Gameplay ==
A screenshot showing the Takoyaki Shop minigame. Kuchipatchi appears on the top screen and talks to customers lining up on the left, while on the bottom screen the player serves a customer by cooking takoyaki via the touchscreen

Unlike the virtual pet, which revolves around players raising and caring for a Tamagotchi, gameplay in Tamagotchi Connection: Corner Shop does not involve caring for a Tamagotchi. Instead, players act as an entrepreneur and serve customers at 11 different shops through a variety of shop-specific minigames. These minigames all utilize the DS's touchscreen for gameplay.

Players start the game by choosing their name before the suffix "tchi" is appended to the end of it, and then choose a partner Tamagotchi: Mametchi, Memetchi or Kuchipatchi. The chosen partner changes the game's theme music, clothes available, and the starting shops. Only two shops are available at the start of the game, with more shops being unlockable after upgrading the existing ones. Mametchi starts with the dentist and dry cleaners unlocked, Memetchi starts with the bakery and florist, and Kuchipatchi starts with a spa and takoyaki shop. The shops appear in three different in-game areas, called Patchi Forest, Mame City, and GuruGuru Town. Patchi Forest includes the takoyaki shop, spa, jewelry shop, and the combination florist-jeweler shop. Mame City consists of the dentist, cleaners, music club, and combination dental-salon shop. Finally, GuruGuru Town hosts the beauty salon, bakery, and florist shops.

Minigames consist of using the DS's stylus to perform tasks, like decorating a cake at the cake shop, cleaning teeth at the dentist, and give makeovers at the hair dressers. Each minigame features menus on the right of the touchscreen which the player can tap on to access different tools and options. In the dentist minigame, the options include a toothbrush, painkiller injections, and cavity implants. While serving a customer, they will converse with your partner Tamagotchi on the top screen. When a customer is served, the player will receive a rating from zero to three smiley faces, and will receive the in-game currency Gotchi Points. If the player performs poorly in the minigame, customers will leave unhappy, but will still pay for service.

After successfully playing through the store's minigame multiple times, a relative of your partner Tamagotchi will give the player 5,000 Gotchi Points and the option to upgrade the store's rank. The relative is implied to be the partner Tamagotchi's father, who is disguised to appear as a normal customer. After doing this twice, Princess Tamako will arrive and upgrade the shop to its final Royal rank. Shops start at the Petchi rank, before being upgraded to Metchi, Gotchi, and finally Royal. Upgrading all of the in-game shops to Royal rank by winning the favor of Princess Tamako is the ultimate goal of the game. As shops get upgraded the minigames become more complex and the player will be rewarded with more Gotchi when serving customers. The physical size of the shop is also increased when upgraded.

Two special combination shops can be unlocked after upgrading the corresponding base shops. The florist and jewelry shops are combined into a florist-jewelry shop, where players use flowers instead of gems to create necklaces and brooches. The dentist and salon shop combine to form a dental-salon shop, where customers provide the player with a photo of what they want their teeth to look like and the player copies the design by providing silver etchings, colored glazes, lettering, and accessories like diamonds and bows. Additionally, one of the shops features a rhythm minigame.

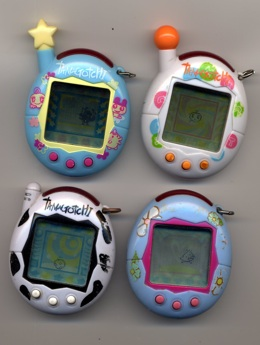
Tamagotchi Connection virtual pet devices. Corner Shop players can earn Gotchi Points through their Connection V2 toys.

80 different Tamagotchi creatures appear in game, with the majority being customers who visit the various shops. After upgrading the initial shops to their max rank, players are able to purchase the nine remaining shops using their Gotchi. Players can also earn Gotchi Points through their Tamagotchi Connection Version 2 toys.

The game features some light life simulation elements, through the game's Care mode. In this mode, players can to give their partner Tamagotchi food and decorate their home. Interaction with the partner Tamagotchi is limited, and the game mode is completely optional. Playing the minigames will unlock items like clothes, food, furniture, and wallpaper and will also give the players Gotchi Points which can be used to purchase more items.

Cheat codes could also be used to unlock additional items. Players could also exchange gifts and data with one another via DS wireless connection, and send a demo of the game via DS Download Play.

== Development ==
Bandai Games announced that a Tamagotchi video game was in development for the Nintendo DS on June 6, 2005, with an estimated Japanese release in September. The game was developed by NanaOn-Sha, who had gained notability for the studio's work on the Parappa the Rapper games. NanaOn-Sha had previously collaborated with Bandai on the WonderSwan game Rhyme Rider Kerorican, released in 2000. Despite the game not selling well, the development solidified the studio's relationship with Bandai, leading to them working together again on Corner Shop. The game's female producer stated that an inspiration for the game was the fact that being a shopkeeper was a common dream for Japanese girls, the target audience of the game. Another inspiration came from children's constantly changing answers when asked about future career options. The game's producers wanted to give children options to try different careers, such as being a florist or a cake shop owner. The game's spa shop was inspired by Japanese public baths.

The official Japanese name was revealed on June 21. Bandai series producer Sanae Honma stated that the Japanese name, Tamagocchi no Puchi Puchi Omisecchi, comes from the "puchi puchi" sound made when tapping the stylus against the touchscreen. In August the localized title was revealed to be Tamagotchi: Corner Shop before "Connection" was added later. In July, the game's release date was revealed to be September 15, 2005 in Japan. On August 25 Bandai announced that the game would be getting a US release in 2006.

== Release ==
The game was showcased with a playable demo at the Tokyo Game Show in September 2005. At the event, IGN reported that the "whole thing is as Japanese as tempura, and the US members of the preview meeting at Bandai's headquarters... were confused by the whole concept, wondering how this game... would translate across coasts." The game was released in Japan on September 15, 2005. On November 18, 2005, Atari announced that they would distribute the game in Europe in early 2006, under the title Tamagotchi Connexion: Corner Shop, with Bandai's European branch as publisher.

Corner Shop was originally scheduled to be released on February 14, 2006 in North America before being pushed up to January 31 the same year. The game was published by Bandai, before its merger with Namco. Corner Shop released in Europe, Australia, and New Zealand on June 16, 2006. It was originally slated to release in April 2006 in Europe.

== Reception ==
Reception

Aggregate score
Aggregator	Score
Metacritic	59/100

Review scores
Publication	Score
Edge	4/10
Eurogamer	4/10
Game Informer	6.5/10
GameSpot	6.4/10
GameSpy	2/5
GamesRadar+	3/5
IGN	6/10
Nintendo Power	5/10
Nintendo World Report	6/10
Pocket Gamer	2/5

=== Critical reception ===
According to review aggregator platform Metacritic, Tamagotchi Connection: Corner Shop received an average score of 59/100, indicating mixed or average reviews. Several reviewers criticized the repetitive nature of the minigames, noting that gameplay is only enjoyable in short bursts. Jon Jordan of Pocket Gamer compared the repetitive nature of the minigames to Groundhog Day, writing that the same customers return daily to request the same services. Many critics also thought that the game not being a true life simulator akin to the popular toy line was odd, with Steve Thomason of Nintendo Power advising those who want a pet simulator to instead play Nintendogs. Writing for G4's XPlay, Justin Leeper called the optional Care game mode "thinner than Christian Bale in The Machinist". Critics also negatively compared the game to WarioWare, with one critic calling it a "junior version of Trauma Center". Brett Elston of GamesRadar+ noted the similarities of the game to modern-day consumerism, writing that "the reason for the tedious work is, naturally, the acquirement of material things... just keep working to buy stuff you don't need or appreciate."

Critics praised the game's art style, soundtrack, and "goofy" sound design. Appreciation was also directed toward the game's "cute" characters. Praise was also directed at the feel-good nature of the game, with multiple critics referring to the game as "therapeutic". Critics highlighted the percussion shop's rhythm minigame as a standout, comparing it to previous works by NanaOn-Sha.

Retrospectives have referred to the Corner Shop series as wholesome or cozy games, with Leah Williams of GamesHub stating "with its cutesy drawn style, great soundbites and relaxing gameplay, it's the kind of game that really tickles your brain while letting you completely relax."

=== Sales ===
Tamagotchi Connection: Corner Shop sold well in Japan, placing in the top spot in weekly sales for its second week on the market. It was the 8th best-selling game of 2005 in Japan, selling over 770,000 copies. On January 12, 2006, Bandai revealed that the game had sold 1 million copies in Japan. Corner Shop was one of the first seven DS games to sell one million copies, doing so just over a year after the system's debut. Additionally, Corner Shop was the first DS game not developed or published by Nintendo to sell 1 million units. The game sold around 330,000 more copies in Japan in 2006, totalling over 1.1 million sold in Japan by the end of the year. To date, the game has sold 1.12 million copies in the region, and 1.48 million copies worldwide, making it the 61st best selling Nintendo DS games of all time. In a financial report, Bandai stated that the domestic release of the game was "particularly successful with girls in the elementary school age group." In the United States, Corner Shop was the number one most ordered game on Amazon.com in its release week.

== Legacy ==
Tamagotchi Connection: Corner Shop was honored with the Excellence Award at the 2006 CESA Awards. The game spawned the Corner Shop series, which as of 2025 consists of nine games. The game was remade in the 2012 Japan-only 3DS game, Cho~ritchi! Tamagotchi no Puchi Puchi Omisetchi.

The game's dialogue spawned an Internet meme in Japan in the 2020s, particularly the line uttered by Marutchi, "I won't be coming again". The line appears if players serve Marutchi poorly. Attention was drawn to the line by streamers, who highlighted the plain expression on Marutchi's face when the serious-sounding line was said. The line was referenced by Bandai in a Tamagotchi Official Short animation titled "Serving Marutchi", and made an appearance in Tamagotchi Plaza. The line was selected as the "Model Press buzzword grand prize 2024" by PR Times. Marutchi and the phrase have been featured in various merchandise, including figures, stickers, and has appeared in collaborations with Thank You Mart and packaged manjū from Yamazaki Bread.

== See also ==
- Tamagotchi
- Tamagotchi Connection: Corner Shop 2
- Tamagotchi Connection: Corner Shop 3
