= Tamagotchi Plaza =

2025 video game

- Key artwork, from left to right featuring Memetchi, Mametchi, and Kuchipatchi.
- Developer: Hyde, Inc.
- Publisher: Bandai Namco Entertainment
- Director: Ichitaka Hosobuchi
- Producer: Kenichi Yanagiharai
- Designers: Genki Kimura Takuya Shimokawa Yuriko Suda
- Programmer: Kairi Hanatani
- Artists: Naoyo Kanno; Hinata Higa
- Writers: Akiko Ogawa; Tomomi Kobayashi
- Composers: Kemmei Adachi; Yu Ogata
- Series: Tamagotchi
- Platforms: Nintendo Switch; Nintendo Switch 2
- Release: JP: June 26, 2025; WW: June 27, 2025
- Genres: Minigame collection, Life simulator
- Modes: Single Player, Multiplayer

Tamagotchi Plaza (Note: Japanese: たまごっちのプチプチおみせっち おまちど～さま！, Hepburn: Tamagotchi no Puchi Puchi Omisetchi: Omachi Do~Sama!; lit. 'Tamagotchi Little Little Shoptchi: Thank You For Waiting!') is a shop simulation video game based on the Tamagotchi toy line for the Nintendo Switch and Nintendo Switch 2. It released worldwide on June 27, 2025, making it the first Tamagotchi video game to be released outside of Japan in 17 years.

Tamagotchi Plaza is a continuation of the popular Tamagotchi Connection: Corner Shop series, which began on the Nintendo DS twenty years earlier in 2005. Similar to the rest of the series, gameplay involves serving customers via shop-specific minigames and upgrading the shops.

The game received generally negative reviews from critics, who panned the repetitive and grinding nature of its minigames, as well as the lack of tutorials for the minigames. Despite the negative reviews, the game sold well in its native Japan and was credited with reviving interest in the Tamagotchi brand.

== Gameplay ==
In the Galette Shop minigame, players work with the shop owner, Kuchipatchi, to cook the meal requested

In Tamagotchi Plaza, players take the role of chairperson for the upcoming Tamagotchi Festival, and are tasked with helping shopkeepers serve customers via minigames. Each shop houses a minigame related to its theme, such as crafting glasses at an optometrist and cleaning teeth at a dental clinic. After serving the customer, the player receives Gotchi Points and is given a rating out of three smiley-faces. These points can be used to upgrade shops and improve the town square. When a shop is upgraded, more features are added to the shop's minigame, increasing the minigame's complexity. Many of the minigames are taken from the earlier DS games, including the dentist shop from the original game.

The player progresses by increasing the shop's reputation. After the player has served enough customers and received good reviews, Prince Tamahiko will visit the shop and offer to upgrade it. If mistakes are made and customers leave unhappy, the player will need to serve more customers before getting a chance to upgrade. The goal of the game is to help upgrade all the shops in order to get the town ready for the upcoming festival. Twelve shops were available at launch on the Switch version of the game, with more available on the Switch 2 and additional shops added to both versions via free updates. Some shops allow two-players to play local co-op and versus game modes, a first in the series. In the Switch version, 10 out of 12 shops are available at the start of the game with two being "secret" combination shops unlockable after both shops that are part of the combination are upgraded to Gotchi level (the second highest level possible).

At the start of the game, the player chooses a partner Tamagotchi, who acts as the player's avatar, to move about the town and go to different shops. The player is also given a smartphone that grants access to a town map, a Tamagotchi social media platform where news is shared, and a guest list detailing Tamagotchis the player has met. Tamahiko Town acts as a hub world linking the shops together. In the town, players control their partner Tamagotchi in a 3D environment, interacting with various NPC Tamagotchis and performing minor tasks including watering plants and picking up litter. There are six partner Tamagotchi characters that the player can choose from, and they can be swapped at any time. Each shop is run by a different shopkeeper Tamagotchi who speaks with customers during gameplay. The game features 100 Tamagotchi characters that the player can serve in shops, including characters who debuted with the original 1996 toys to the then-newest characters introduced in Tamagotchi Uni. These characters populate the town and occasionally converse with the player. Serving them in shops unlocks a detailed view of the character. Further interactions with the Tamagotchi add updated photos to their journal entry.

=== Nintendo Switch 2 Edition ===
The Nintendo Switch 2 version of the game had three additional shops available at launch, bringing the total shops available to fifteen. These three additional shops all utilize the Joy-Con 2's mouse functionality. The additional shops are a sushi restaurant, a shuriken shop, and a combined "sushi-shuriken" shop. In the sushi restaurant, the player holds the Joy-Con 2 like a typical computer mouse and uses the shoulder buttons to mimic grabbing various ingredients to make the meal. In the shuriken shop, players swipe their hand on the mouse sensor to mimic throwing a shuriken at targets. The Nintendo Switch 2 edition also features higher resolution and frame rates in TV and handheld modes. Players who own the Nintendo Switch version of the game can purchase an optional upgrade to the Switch 2 edition.

=== Tamagotchi Uni features ===
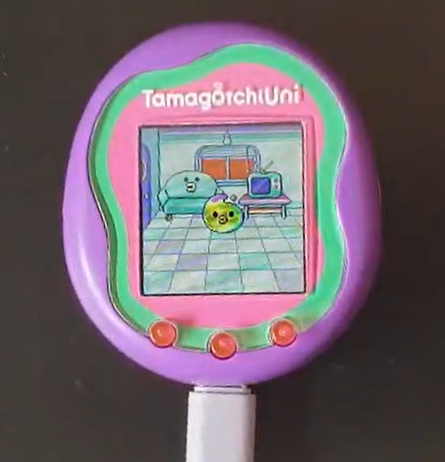
Tamagotchi Uni virtual pet. Tamagotchi Plaza players can connect to their Uni device to access exclusive items and events.

The game can connect to Tamagotchi Uni virtual pets, allowing players to gain access to exclusive items and events. This functionality is similar to how the website TamaTown functioned, which allowed players to exchange items between the website and their Tamagotchi Connection toys. Players get rewards in both Uni and Plaza, including additional ways to earn Gotchi, limited items, minigames, and exclusive Tamagotchis.

== Plot ==
The Gotchi King of Tamagotchi Planet has commanded that a Tamagotchi Festival be held, and that various cities place bids to have the festival held in their locale. Prince Tamahiko visits Earth and kidnaps a human, identified as the real-world player, and transports them to Tamagotchi Planet via his UFO. Prince Tamahiko appoints the player as the Chairperson of the Bid Committee, and must work alongside a chosen partner Tamagotchi, or vice-chair, to prepare Tamahiko Town (Note: Also identified as "the 'City of Love' on Tamagotchi Planet".) to host the festival. The player is tasked with upgrading shops, serving the towns residents, and improving the plaza to increase the town's chance of being chosen to host the festival. After the player upgrades and unlocks every store, the Tamagotchi Festival will be held.

== Development ==
Tamagotchi Plaza was developed by Hyde, Inc., who handled the main programming, and Nicolabo Inc., who worked on planning, writing, and sound production. It is the first Tamagotchi video game released outside of Japan since Tamagotchi Connection: Corner Shop 3 in 2008. This makes it the first Tamagotchi video game released on a game console in eight years in Japan, and the first released outside the country in seventeen years. Series producer Sanae Honma (Note: In-game credits list Honma as "Chief Producer" at Bandai Namco Entertainment Inc., alongside Hidefumi Komino.) of Bandai Namco Entertainment stated that the reason a new game in the series was developed after a long hiatus was because they saw interest in the Tamagotchi brand building from the generation who had played the original games on the DS. The rise of Hesei-era retro gaming and popularity of the original games among streamers also motivated the creation of a new entry in the series.

Development began with collaboration between Akiko Ogawa, CEO of Nicolabo, and Sanae Honma of Bandai, who have worked together on the series since the first game in 2005. Ogawa originally worked at NanaOn-Sha, and has worked on the script, world-building, and shop concepts since the first game. The team began with coming up with ideas for the various stores. A large list of potential shops was created before being refined and balanced to avoid shops that would be too "girly", too food-focused, or too repetitive. When creating new shops for the game, designers looked for real world jobs that children would like to try. They aimed to create a variety of jobs, as children often change their mind when asked about future career goals. The Night Pool and Afternoon Tea shops were created to give children access to environments they would otherwise not be able to in real life.

The gameplay was designed with realism in mind. Honma explained that the lack of tutorials for the minigames is meant to simulate what it is really like working in a service job, where workers are put on the spot and aren't given opportunities to refer to manuals when serving customers. Additionally, even if a player stops playing a minigame customers will continue to come through the shop's doors, similar to the real world pressure faced by workers in a busy store. Other game mechanics also reflect real-world business practices, including charging full price for imperfect items or service. Customers will also gradually stop visiting a shop if they receive consistently poor service. Conversely, if the player performs well a large line can form at the store, reflecting the realities of working in a popular store that the producers stated they wished to emulate.

Series writer Akiko Ogawa noted that children playing the original games likely never noticed the dialogue, as it all took place on the top screen of the DS while gameplay was on the bottom. She stated that since Plaza's gameplay and dialogue take place on one screen she wasn't worried about players missing dialogue. While the original games relied on the DS stylus and touch controls, the developers of Plaza began with trying button controls first. Having found the button controls to work smoothly for the game, they decided to completely focus on button controls. Honma also stated that they wanted to develop a Switch 2 edition of the game to take advantage of controller gimmicks of the Joy-Con 2, similar to how the stylus was used to play games on the DS touchscreen in the original games. The Rap Battle shop was included as most games in the series include a rhythm game. The rap battle minigame was originally going to be a "Voice Percussion" or beatbox shop, but was ultimately changed to rap battle to appeal to modern music interests. While the original games were targeted toward young girls, Bandai wanted to target both children and adults with Plaza, especially adults who played the original games twenty years prior. When designing combination shops, the designers chose to combine shops that they thought would make for strange or amusing results.

== Release ==
=== Pre-release ===
Tamagotchi Plaza was announced in a Nintendo Direct presentation on March 27, 2025. Digital pre-orders for the game began on March 28 in Japan. The game was originally announced exclusively for the Nintendo Switch, with a Switch 2 edition being announced on June 6. A demo of the game was available to be played at the "Nintendo Switch 2 Experience" event in Makuhari Messe in Chiba on April 26 and 27, prior to the Nintendo Switch 2's launch. From May 22 to 25, the game was showcased with a playable demo at the PlayX4 gaming expo in South Korea. From June 6 to 8, Bandai Namco Entertainment showcased the game at Anime Festival Asia at the Jakarta Convention Center in Indonesia. A demo of the game was available to play, and players were given Plaza-themed keychains and headbands. On June 11, an official fan book was released in Japan that celebrated the 20th anniversary of the Corner Shop series. From June 18 to July 31, 2025, an in-person event promoting the game was held in Shibuya. The event featured a demo of the game, limited edition merchandise for purchase, and character greetings with costumed Tamagotchi characters. Famous Japanese sushi restaurateur, Kiyoshi Kimura, also known as "The Tuna King", made an appearance at the event and played the sushi restaurant minigame alongside series producer Sanae Honma.

=== Release ===
The game released on the Nintendo Switch and Switch 2 on June 26, 2025 in Japan, and June 27, 2025, worldwide. On its first day of release in Japan, it was announced that the game would also be receiving future updates that would add additional free content. The game received a physical release in Japan and Europe, with a digital-only release on the Nintendo eShop in other regions. Plaza's 2025 release corresponded with the series' 20th anniversary, with the first game being released on the DS in 2005.

=== Post-release ===
==== Updates ====
Tamagotchi Plaza received several large free updates in the year following its release. On July 10, 2025, the first free game update released, which added a short story that takes place after the end of the main campaign. On September 12, a takoyaki shop was added to both versions of the game. On November 12, a cake shop was added to the Switch and Switch 2 versions of the game as a free update. On February 18, 2026, a "Violin Lesson" shop was added as a free update. The violin lesson game originated in the 2012 3DS eShop exclusive game Cho-Ritch! Tamagotchi's Petit Petit Shop Violin Lesson. The shop supports multiplayer and is available in both versions of the game, with the Switch 2 version supporting mouse controls. To promote the update, a demo of the game was available for three days in Harajuku and players were given a sticker of Prince Tamahiko. Players who followed the official X account would also receive a sticker of the Melodycchi, who runs the violin lesson shop. Outside of Japan, staff from Bandai Namco Entertainment America live streamed themselves playing through the new violin lesson minigame to promote the update.

On June 9, 2026, a major "Resort" update was released for both game versions. In the update, Prince Tamahiko builds "Maison de Poka", a resort for the ten shop managers to relax at and decompress from work related stress. Players can decorate a room in the resort with various furniture items, listen in to Tamagotchis conversations, and upgrade the resort to add one additional room for decoration. The resort's rooms are viewed from a dollhouse perspective. Bandai Namco Entertainment also announced that future free updates will expand the resort.

==== Marketing ====
Bandai continued to promote the game in the months following its release, including through merchandise, cross-brand collaborations, demos and showcases at various video game expos, and through digital item distributions. In the days following the game's release, a browser-based mobile phone game was launched to promote the game. The game is a simplified version of the dentist minigame from Plaza, where the player tries to remove cavities from a patient. In July, special codes were distributed to promote the launch of new virtual pet Tamagotchi Paradise which provided exclusive items in Plaza and Paradise. From August 29 to September 4, Amazon Japan sold the game with limited edition packaging and a digital wallpaper. Amazon later sold a limited bundle of the Switch 2 game with a plush toy of Mametchi, which also included the digital wallpaper. To promote the takoyaki shop update, a collaboration between Tamagotchi and takoyaki restaurant chain Tsukiji Gindako ran from October 20, 2025, which featured limited edition food packaging featuring Tamagotchi characters eating takoyaki. In September 2025, special edition Tamagotchi digital pets were released in Japan to commemorate the release of Tamagotchi Plaza. Starting on September 11, plush toys of the game's characters were available in Banpresto claw machines. Passwords were also distributed by Bandai which could be used to redeem in-game items. One item distributed this way provided players with a hat worn by the mascot of Japanese baseball team Shimane Susanoo Magic.

Bandai Namco Entertainment showcased Tamagotchi Plaza at a number of gaming expos in the months following the game's release. The game was featured with a playable demo at San Diego Comic-Con from July 24 to 27. From September 25 to 28, a playable demo of the Switch 2 version was available at the Tokyo Game Show. A demo of the game was also available at the Gamescom Asia x Thailand Game Show from October 17 to 19 in Bangkok.

On November 20, 2025, a bundle went on sale that includes the Nintendo Switch 2 console, a physical copy of Tamagotchi Plaza on Switch 2, and a Tamagotchi themed Switch 2 carrying case. The carrying case was also made available for sale separately. Also in November, convenience store chain Lawson offered a lottery in collaboration with Plaza, with the top prize being a Tamagotchi digital pet themed after the game. Bandai ran a contest from October 2025 to January 7, 2026, where players could submit screenshots of manga they made at the in-game manga shop, with the winner receiving a framed print of their work. From November 21 to January 15, 2026, Capcom Cafe ran a promotion which featured items based on the Tamagotchi Corner Shop series for sale. On February 10, 2026, a book was released in Japan that teaches readers English based on phrases characters say in the game. The book also included codes for items that can be redeemed in Tamagotchi Plaza.

== Reception ==
=== Critical response ===
Reception

Aggregate scores
Aggregator	Score
Metacritic	43/100 (Note: Based on 20 reviews)
OpenCritic	28% recommend (Note: Based on 30 reviews)

Review scores
Publication	Score
CG Magazine	6/10
Checkpoint Gaming	5/10
Digitally Downloaded	3/5
Gamereactor	4/10
Nintendo Life	3/10
Nintendo World Report	4/10
Siliconera	5/10
TechRadar	1/5

Tamagotchi Plaza received "generally unfavorable" reviews according to review aggregator platform Metacritic, with the Nintendo Switch 2 edition being the sixth-worst-rated game on the site in 2025. Fellow review aggregator OpenCritic assessed that the game received weak approval, being recommended by only 28% of critics. Critics praised the game's presentation, but criticized the repetitive and grinding nature of the minigames, with Zubi Khan of CG Magazine calling the gameplay "charming but shallow". Critics also panned the game's lack of difficulty, noting that adults will be bored of the game within minutes. Multiple critics compared the minigames negatively to the kind that could be found on browsers or mobile phones. Many critics also panned the lack of in-game tutorials for the minigames, which they described as frustrating and inappropriate for the games target audience. Some critics also panned the lack of touch controls, stating that using the buttons to navigate the user interface does not feel intuitive.

Some reviewers praised the game for its simplicity and low-stress gameplay. Josh Broadwell of Polygon praised the game for its low stakes pacing that he credited for curing his insomnia. Writing for ScreenHub, Leah J. Williams praised the return of the series' minigames and cozy presentation, as well as the modern improvements. Writing for DenfaminicoGamer, Mota Okai jokingly praised the game for letting players work in a positive work environment and recommended it for adults who are exhausted by real-world work stress. Daz Skubich of Pocket Tactics praised the game for the nostalgia it invoked and called it "a love letter to the mid-2000s DS games".

=== Sales ===
==== Japan ====
Despite receiving mostly negative reviews, Tamagotchi Plaza sold well in its native Japan. The game was in the top three pre-ordered video games on Amazon Japan for much of April, May, and June. (Note: Number 1 from April 20 to 26, May 18 to 24, June 8 to 14, and June 15 to 21. Number 2 from April 27 to May 3, and May 11 to 17. Number 3 from May 25 to 31) According to Famitsu, the Nintendo Switch version of Tamagotchi Plaza was the second-best-selling video game in Japan on its release week, with combined physical sales of both versions totalling 128,685. Just 5 days after its release, Nintendo revealed that the game was already the third best-selling Switch eShop game for the first half of 2025. The Switch version was the second-best-selling video game in Japan for the month of June, selling 102,289 units. For the second week of July 2025, Plaza was the second-best-selling video game in Japan, with combined sales reaching 176,893 units sold. By the end of July, combined sales of Tamagotchi Plaza on the Switch and Switch 2 reached 200,000 units in Japan, with the Switch version listed as the third best selling game in Japan for the month. Tamagotchi Plaza was the best selling Nintendo eShop game on the Switch and the second-best-selling game for the Switch 2 in Japan for the month of July, coming second to Donkey Kong Bananza.

Nintendo revealed that the game was one of its best selling games on the eShop for the year of 2025, with the Nintendo Switch version being the second-best-selling game behind Pokemon Legends Z-A, and the Switch 2 version being the ninth best selling game. The Nintendo Switch version was the 14th best selling video game overall in Japan for the year of 2025, with 215,619 units sold. The Switch 2 edition placed as the 38th highest selling game, with 85,717 units sold. On November 12, 2025, it was announced that the game had shipped over 500,000 physical and digital copies domestically. Both editions of the game remained in the top 20 selling eShop games for January 2026. By February 2026, the Switch 2 edition had sold 98,648 physical copies.

==== International ====
Sales outside of Japan were slow. In the UK, Tamagotchi Plaza performed poorly on initial release, starting at 29th place in the charts, behind games that had been out for months or even years. Overall, the game was reported as performing poorly outside of Japan.

As sales of the Tamagotchi toy line approached 100 million units, Chisato Aoyagi of Bandai stated that she believes Tamagotchi Plaza played a role in boosting the interest in the overall Tamagotchi brand.

== See also ==
- Tamagotchi
- Tamagotchi Connection: Corner Shop
