= Tamagotchi Connection: Corner Shop 2 =

2006 video game

- European cover art
- Developers: NanaOn-Sha; Dimps
- Publishers: WW: Namco Bandai Games; AU: Atari
- Producer: Masaya Matsuura
- Series: Tamagotchi
- Platform: Nintendo DS
- Release: JP: July 27, 2006; NA: November 14, 2006; EU: March 23, 2007; AU: April 5, 2007
- Genre: Life simulation game
- Modes: Single-player multiplayer

Tamagotchi Connection: Corner Shop 2 (Note: Japanese: たまごっちのプチプチおみせっち ごひーきに, Hepburn: Tamagotchi no Puchi Puchi Omisecchi Gohi-Kini) is a 2006 shop simulation game developed by NanaOn-Sha and Dimps, and published by Namco Bandai Games and Atari for the Nintendo DS. The game is based on the virtual-pet toy, Tamagotchi, and tasks players with running shops and serving customers in different store-specific minigames. It is the sequel to Tamagotchi Connection: Corner Shop, and was followed by Tamagotchi Connection: Corner Shop 3. The game was released in Japan and North America in 2006, and Europe and Australia in 2007.

The game is primarily a minigame collection, featuring twelve minigames themed around various shops that are played exclusively via the DS's touchscreen. An optional mode allows players to have basic interactions with their partner Tamagotchi, in a similar style to the toy line.

Corner Shop 2 received mixed reviews from critics, who praised the art style but criticized the repetitive nature of the minigames. As of 2023, the game had sold 1.09 million copies worldwide, making it the 71st best selling Nintendo DS games of all time.

== Gameplay ==
In the Gas Station minigame, Mametchi appears on the top screen and talks to customers, while the player services the customer on the bottom screen.

The gameplay of Corner Shop 2 remains much the same as the original, with some new minigames added and quality of life improvements over the original. Unlike the Tamagotchi toy line, the main gameplay does not involve caring for a virtual pet, and instead players assume the role of store owner and serve customers through various minigames. The game starts with the player choosing a Tamagotchi partner to open a business with. After choosing a partner, the player purchases one of four available shops in Tama Mall and gets to work serving customers in shop-specific minigames. All minigames are played using the Nintendo DS touchscreen, with the top screen usually reserved for instructions and dialogue between your partner and the customer being served.

After serving customers, the player receives the in-game-currency, Gotchi, and is given a review. Gotchi can be used to purchase new shops and upgrade existing ones. There are four levels of expansions per business: Putchi, Metchi, Gotchi, and Royal. Shops start at Putchi rank, and players are tasked with upgrading all of their shops to their max level by serving more customers and earning more Gotchi. Progressing through the initial shops will unlock more, for a total of twelve shops available. Upgrading the shops unlocks more Tamagotchis available as customers, and makes the minigames slightly more difficult and complex. Three shops are carried-over from the first game, the florist, bakery, and concert hall. The minigames for these shops remain mostly the same with some additional features and improvements. In addition to touchscreen controls, the concert hall makes use of the DS' built-in microphone. New shops available include a gas station, sushi restaurant, health clinic, and a bowling alley. Players can also unlock two special "combo shops" that combine elements of existing shops: a sushi-bowling alley where sushi is placed on bowling lanes instead of pins, and a music clinic, where players heal customers with music.

Corner Shop 2 has an optional game mode that allows players to care for their partner Tamagotchi. Players can feed their Tamagotchi snacks and dress them. In addition to upgrading stores, Gotchi can be used to purchase snacks and cosmetics for the partner Tamagotchi, including home decorations and costumes. Additionally, Tamagotchi Connection V4 toys included passwords that could be inputted in Corner Shop 2 to unlock exclusive items.

The game features over 100 different Tamagotchi, the majority of which appear as customers. Many of the Tamagotchi characters that appear as customers from the first game return, as well as new characters from Tamagotchi Connection V4, Tamagotchi School, and Uratama. There are three partner Tamagotchi available, plus a fourth available as a secret unlock after upgrading all the stores to their max "Royal" rank. New to the sequel, the game features a directory that shows all the Tamagotchi the player has encountered. The directory lets players see the Tamagotchi's name and how well they have served them in the past. After serving a customer, they will give a rating based on their happiness level, and their happiness determines future dialogue between them and the player's partner Tamagotchi. Additionally, customers who receive better service are more likely to return. Customers will also receive stamps on a loyalty card each time they visit a shop.

Players who own the game can also send a demo copy of the game to others via DS Download Play. Players could also trade items and screenshots over Nintendo Wi-Fi Connection. From November 9 to 29, 2006, players in Japan were also able to exchange Gotchi for exclusive items by visiting DS Download Stations. One item distributed this way was a Nintendo Wii.

== Plot ==
The game begins with the player receiving the news that they have just won 10,000 Gotchi from the Tama Lottery. The player's partner Tamagotchi advises them to use their winnings to purchase shops at Tama Mall and provide essential services to Tama Town's residents.

== Development ==
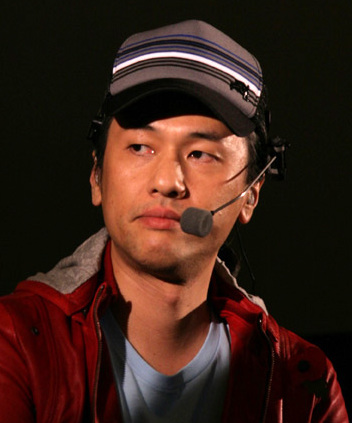
Masaya Matsuura, whose studio NanaOn-Sha produced the game

Due to the success of Tamagotchi Connection: Corner Shop, development on a sequel began quickly. The game began development prior to the merger of Namco and Bandai in March 2006. NanaOn-Sha, who developed the first game, co-developed Corner Shop 2 with Dimps, who assisted with creating new minigames. Referring to the US localization, the game's localization manager Brian Glazebrook stated that the biggest changes needed were to the game's humor. He stated "it's more of a cultural thing. Some of the humor doesn't translate well to us, some of it is completely foreign to us. Areas such as that, we had to take some liberties."

Corner Shop 2 was announced in February 2006 at the Nintendo DS Conference 2006 Spring press event. On August 17, 2006 Namco Bandai Games America announced the game would be getting an international release, with an estimated release window of Winter 2006 in the USA. The game was published by Namco Bandai in Japan, North America, and Europe, and by Atari in Australia.

== Release ==
Corner Shop 2 was showcased with a playable demo at the World Hobby Fair in Tokyo and Sapporo in June 2006, where it was reported as being the most popular DS game at the event. In Japan, the game released on July 27, 2006. Corner Shop 2 was further showcased at the Tokyo Game Show in September 2006. On November 3, 2006, Bandai announced that Corner Shop 2 had "gone gold" and was scheduled to be released on November 14, 2006 in North America. The game was released at an MSRP of $29.99 in the United States.

In December 2006, Atari announced that Corner Shop 2 would release in Australia and New Zealand in March 2007. The game was originally scheduled to be released in Europe by the end of 2006, but didn't release until March 23, 2007 with distribution through Atari Europe. The Australian release of the game was also pushed back to April 5, 2007.

== Reception ==
=== Critical reception ===
Reception

Aggregate scores
Aggregator	Score
GameRankings	56.9/100
Metacritic	66/100

Review scores
Publication	Score
Consoles +	12/20
Eurogamer	4/10
GamePro	4.5/5
GamesMaster	69/100
GameSpot	6.7/10
GameSpy	2/5
GamesRadar+	3/5
GameZone	7.1/10
Jeuxvideo.com	13/20

Tamagotchi Connection: Corner Shop 2 holds a rating of 66/100 on review aggregate website Metacritic, indicating "mixed or average reviews". Criticisms were often directed at the overly repetitive and simplistic nature of the minigames.

Several critics stated that the game was entertaining only in short bursts, with Greg Mueller of GameSpot writing that "Corner Shop 2 is clearly designed to be played for a few minutes at a time, but you'll quickly see all the game has to offer by doing so and lose interest. Although the minigames are fun at first, and the visual style goes a long way to give the game a great sense of character, those things aren't quite enough to make the game worth the asking price." Some critics were disappointed with the lack of a true in-game virtual pet simulator, which they found odd given the namesake of the toy line and the popularity of Nintendogs. Reviewers also compared the game, favorably and unfavorably, to contemporary popular minigame collections like WarioWare.

Praise for the game was mostly aimed toward the presentation. Several critics appreciated the art style, with John Walker of Eurogamer writing that "It looks lovely - really simple pastel coloured cartoons, with big grins and barking mad banter." Praise was also directed to the game's soundtrack and sound design, with Michael Taylor of PGNx writing "the sound fits the game very well. The music is very catchy and the limited voice acting from the creatures fits in juts [sic] as well". Critics also praised the variety of the minigames available, while noting that "nothing in the game really simulates how things run in the real world".

Retrospectives have referred to the Corner Shop series as wholesome or cozy games, with Leah Williams of GamesHub stating "with its cutesy drawn style, great soundbites and relaxing gameplay, it's the kind of game that really tickles your brain while letting you completely relax."

=== Sales ===
==== Japan ====
Tamagotchi Connection: Corner Shop 2 was the top-selling game in Japan during the week of its release, selling 192,458 copies. The game was the second best selling video game in the month of August 2006, behind New Super Mario Bros. By mid-November 2006, Corner Shop 2 had already become the 19th best selling DS game in Japan up to that point, with 568,820 units sold. According to Famitsu, the game sold 713,237 copies in the region by the end of 2006, making it the 14th best-selling game in Japan that year. According to Media Create, the game sold 716,067 copies in the same period, and ranked as the 17th top selling game in Japan that year. In a financial report, Bandai stated that the domestic release of the game was "particularly successful with girls in the elementary school age group, like its predecessor the previous year." Despite the release of Corner Shop 3 in Japan in 2007, Corner Shop 2 was still in the top 200 games sold in Japan that year, selling an additional 94,797 units.

==== International ====
According to Bandai Namco's financial report for the fiscal year ending March 31, 2007, Tamagotchi Connection: Corner Shop 2 was the company's third best-selling game worldwide, selling 871,000 units. In May 2007, the game was listed as the tenth best selling DS game in Europe. As of 2023, Corner Shop 2 had sold 1.09 million copies worldwide, making it the 71st best selling game on the Nintendo DS.
