= Tamagotchi (Game Boy video game) =

- Developer: Tom Create
- Publisher: Bandai
- Series: Tamagotchi
- Platform: Game Boy
- Release: JP: June 27, 1997; NA: October 1997
- Genre: Life simulation
- Mode: Single-player

Tamagotchi (Note: Japanese: ゲームで発見!!たまごっち, Hepburn: Game de Hakken!! Tamagotchi; lit. 'Discovered in a Game!! Tamagotchi') is a 1997 simulation game for the Game Boy. It is based on the popular electronic toy Tamagotchi that was released in 1996 and became a popular toy in Japan. A similar wave of popularity for Tamagotchi entered the West on the toy's release, but faded much faster than the toy's popularity in Japan. During this wave of popularity, several spin-off items were created, including the Tom Create-developed Tamagotchi video game.

Like the original toy, Tamagotchi has the player raise a virtual pet. The game lets players raise up to three pets at a time and nurtures them through activities such as feeding, training, and cleaning up after their pets. The game adds more possible pets than the original toy and has more complex games with their pets and putting them into competitions.

The game sold over three million units. A sequel was released for the Game Boy in Japan within the same year.

== Gameplay ==
Tamagotchi is a life simulation video game for the Game Boy. It is based on the virtual pet toy also named Tamagotchi. The general gameplay involves keeping the virtual pet healthy and happy for as long as possible. Players start a game by going to the Egg Room to select a name for their pet that is still in an egg. The player can raise up to three Tamagotchis at once.

Most of the gameplay is set at the Home screen where the player can monitor their pet as it grows and morphs into new forms. While the original toy operated in real-time, the Game Boy version has an in-game hour pass in just a few minutes. The player can take care of their Tamagotchi by feeding and cleaning it, playing games with it and entering it in tournaments. The player can also praise or scold a Tamagotchi, which will influence its character as it grows older. Games can be played with the Tamagotchi to develop its IQ or increase its physical strength. The Tamagotchi requires regular feeding. Feeding it adjusts the pet's life meter, and each Tamagotchi has a favourite food. Some foods affect the pet's Fun meter and can even change it to morph into a character that is often in poor health.

== Development and release ==
The digital pet Tamagotchi was released by Bandai in Japan in late 1996 and became an immediate hit in the country. The popularity of Tamagotchi led to various imitation toys and variations of the original toy. The toys were later released in the West and while immediately popular, the popularity of the toy quickly died down outside of Japan. Between these periods, a crossover of the toy was released for the Game Boy.

Tamagotchi for the Game Boy was developed by Tom Create. It was published by Bandai and was released for the Game Boy in Japan on June 27, 1997. By August 10, Tamagotchi was among the highest-selling games in Japan, and the second-highest Game Boy game after Pokémon (1996). It was released in North America for the Game Boy in October 1997. The game sold about three-million copies.

== Reception ==
Reception

Review scores
Publication	Score
AllGame	2.5/5
Famitsu	7/10, 7/10, 7/10, 5/10
Nintendo Power	5.5/10

Four editors in Famitsu magazine reviewed the game. One reviewer found the game to be "surprisingly good" as it retained the pleasure of showing off the player's Tamagotchi to others while adding the convenience of being able save at any time. Another reviewer complimented the monsters as being cute and expressive, but said that training them remained difficult. A third reviewer said that while raising the characters was fun, it eventually grew dull and said that it gave the impression that Tamagotchi was not suited as a game where the player is continiously staring at the screen.

In Nintendo Power, the reviewers said the Game Boy version had more activities to keep players engaged and had superior graphics from the original toy, but critiqued the menu icons as being vague. They also found it unclear to decipher what the Tamagotchi pet would want at times. Colin Williamson of Allgame found the appeal of Tamagotchi to be hit or miss depending on how much appeal the player would have for raising little critters. He critiqued the poor in-game translations that had phrases such as "Tamagotchi Likes to Play Early When Upset." and "Speed Competition Results of Tamagotchi Care".

== Legacy ==
A sequel titled Game de Hakken!! Tamagotchi 2 (Note: ゲームで発見!! たまごっち2; lit. 'Discovered in a Game!! Tamagotchi 2') was released for the Game Boy on October 17, 1997.

Gameplay elements from the Game Boy version of Tamagotchi, such as the ability to scold the virtual pet, were added to Tamagotchi toys in 2004 in the Tamagotchi Connection line.

== See also ==
- List of best-selling Game Boy video games
