= 64 de Hakken!! Tamagotchi: Minna de Tamagotchi World =

1997 video game

- Developer: Hudson Soft
- Publisher: Bandai
- Series: Tamagotchi
- Platform: Nintendo 64
- Release: JP: December 19, 1997
- Genre: Board game
- Modes: Single player, multiplayer

64 de Hakken!! Tamagotchi: Minna de Tamagotchi World (Japanese: 64で発見!!たまごっち みんなでたまごっちワールド) is a party video game developed by Bandai and Hudson Soft for the Nintendo 64. It released in Japan on December 19, 1997.

It is a virtual board game based on the Tamagotchi toy. This was the first game by Bandai on the Nintendo 64 system and it is the only Tamagotchi-branded game on the system. The game introduces "Tsukuzuku Tamagotchi", a special variant of Tamagotchi.

== Release and reception ==
Reception

Review scores
Publication	Score
Famitsu	6/10, 5/10, 6/10, 5/10
Joypad	1/10
N64 Magazine	79%
Total!	44/100
64 Magazine	72%
VSixtyFour	7/10

64 de Hakken!! Tamagotchi: Minna de Tamagotchi World was released in Japan for the Nintendo 64 on December 19, 1997. Four writers for Famitsu reviewed the game on its release. The four reviewers found the game to be a bit dull as a board game, with one commenting that it felt like the developers prioritized the appeal of the Tamagotchi characters over pacing or gameplay strategy. One reviewer said that while playtimes felt long, some of the mini-games were fun.
