= Pou (video game) =

2012 virtual pet game

- A screenshot of Pou, the titular game character
- Developer: Paul Salameh
- Publisher: Paul Salameh
- Platforms: Android, iOS, BlackBerry 10
- Release: August 5, 2012: Android; November 26, 2012; iOS; 2013; BlackBerry 10
- Genre: Virtual pet
- Modes: Single-player; multiplayer

Pou (/puː/ or /poʊ/) is a 2012 virtual pet mobile game for BlackBerry 10, iOS and Android developed by Lebanese designer Paul Salameh and published under the name Zakeh Limited to the Google Play Store and the Apple App Store. The game plays similarly to Tamagotchi, a simulation game that requires caring for a simulated creature. It was one of the most downloaded games of 2014.

The creator, Paul Salameh, mentioned during an interview that "People really got strongly attached to their Pou, they found it cute. I saw people who tattooed it on their hands." While Salameh did not comment on download numbers, the game was estimated to have reached 100 million downloads across all platforms.

In 2014, Zakeh partnered with the company Toyze in order to create a series of 3D-printed toys based on the popular videogame. In 2024, Pou made a resurgence on TikTok, appearing in videos where plushies of the character are placed into dangerous situations.

== Gameplay ==
The gameplay is similar to Tamagotchi and other pet caring games. The player has to feed, dress and care for the creature, with the option of dressing it with several cosmetic items.

== Critical reception ==
Reception

Review score
Publication	Score
Slide to Play	2/4

Nadia Oxford of Slide to Play gave Pou a 2/4 rating, and said: "Only kids will be interested in playing with their Pou for a long period of time".

== Sequel ==
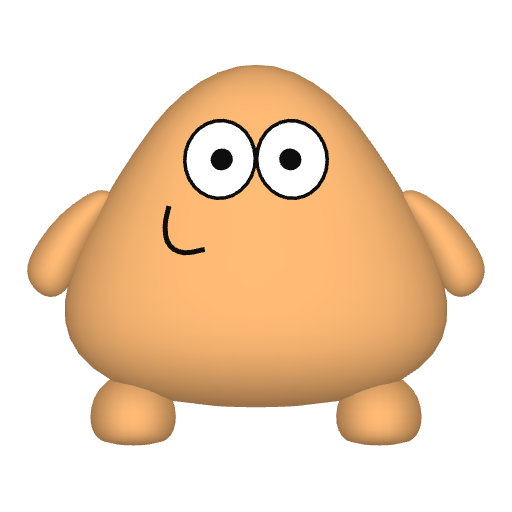
Icon for Pou 3D

In December 2025, a sequel, titled Pou 3D, was published on iOS and Android devices.
