= Tuttuki Bako =

- The lime green version
- Developer: Bandai
- Publisher: Bandai
- Release: JP: October 2008
- Genres: Mini-game, party
- Mode: Single-player

Tuttuki Bako (ツッツキバコ) is a roughly cubic hand-held electronic game created by Bandai in 2008. The game comprises five mini-games (called "Stages"), and a resettable alarm clock. While the minigames are rather simplistic, Tuttuki Bako has received international acclaim for its unique means of control and the game has been put forward as an archetypal example of Akiba-kei and Japanese gadgetry in general.

== Gameplay ==
The game features one input button, a pixelated liquid crystal display (LCD) screen, and a 24 mm (0.94 in) hole in its right-hand side. Into this hole the player is intended to insert an index finger to a depth of up to 6 cm (2.4 in). Inside the box, a matrix of small motion sensors detects the finger and render it on the screen. In this way the player's moving finger is used as the device's primary input. There are five minigames that a player can select from. The single input button brings up the selection menu and then the virtual finger is used to select the game to be played from the screen.

Available games include:

- Amoeba Stage - Players poke at an amoeba-like blob. If the blob becomes attached to the finger then the minigame enters its second phase by announcing "GAME START". Here the player must bounce the blob as if it were a ball. The player earns points for each completed bounce and the score is tallied at the bottom.
- Panda Stage - Players poke at a small panda riding a tire swing to try to spin the tire without swinging it. If the tire is swung, however, the minigame enters its second phase in which the player must swing the panda in order to increase points tallied at the bottom.
- Sea Stage - Players prod an undersea vase to try to flush out an ink-spraying octopus that dwells within.
- Figure Stage - Players poke a small stick figure. If sufficiently riled, the figure will enter "KARATE" mode and will set to work attacking the finger with "PUNCH!" and "KICK!" moves. The minigame features a second phase in which the figure and the player's finger use a seesaw with points awarded and tallied at the bottom for each completed switch.

Tuttuki Bako also features a resettable alarm clock option that allows the player to interact with and set a virtual alarm clock that will then go off at the selected hour. Further selection options include time, sound volume, and contrast. On the back-side of the device there is an embedded "Reset" button that can only be pushed with a pin. This button restores the original conditions bringing the clock and alarm to 00:00AM and resetting any highscores to 0.

== Development ==
Tuttuki Bako was developed by Bandai in 2008. It was released only in Japan at a retail value of $30, and it is manufactured in China. It comes in three colors - red, black, and lime green. In the months prior to its release, Japanese advertisements for the Tuttuki Bako playfully emphasized risqué double entendres relating to the insertion of the player's finger into the box. This innuendo did not go unnoticed in the international community and some English-language reviews reflect similar humor.

== Reception ==
The game was generally well-received internationally where it was described as "delightfully inexplicable" and "wonderfully weird." The game was also compared favorably with Bandai's earlier Tamagotchi line. Although some reviews described the Tuttuki Bako as "a bad idea" or "useless and barely entertaining," the same reviewers were often quick to point out exonerating aspects such the device's inherent interestingness and the retro-feel of the system. One negative aspect of the game that reviewers noted was its relatively steep import cost in the range of $50–$70 USD. Because the game was released only in Japan, international players had to go through importers and Tuttuki Bako's sales price tended to reflect increased shipping/handling as well as third party markup.

== See also ==
- Mugen Puchipuchi - A similar game/toy from Bandai (asovision).
- Tamagotchi - A similar virtual pet game released by Bandai.
- Finger boxes - An art installation.
