= List of Tamagotchi characters =

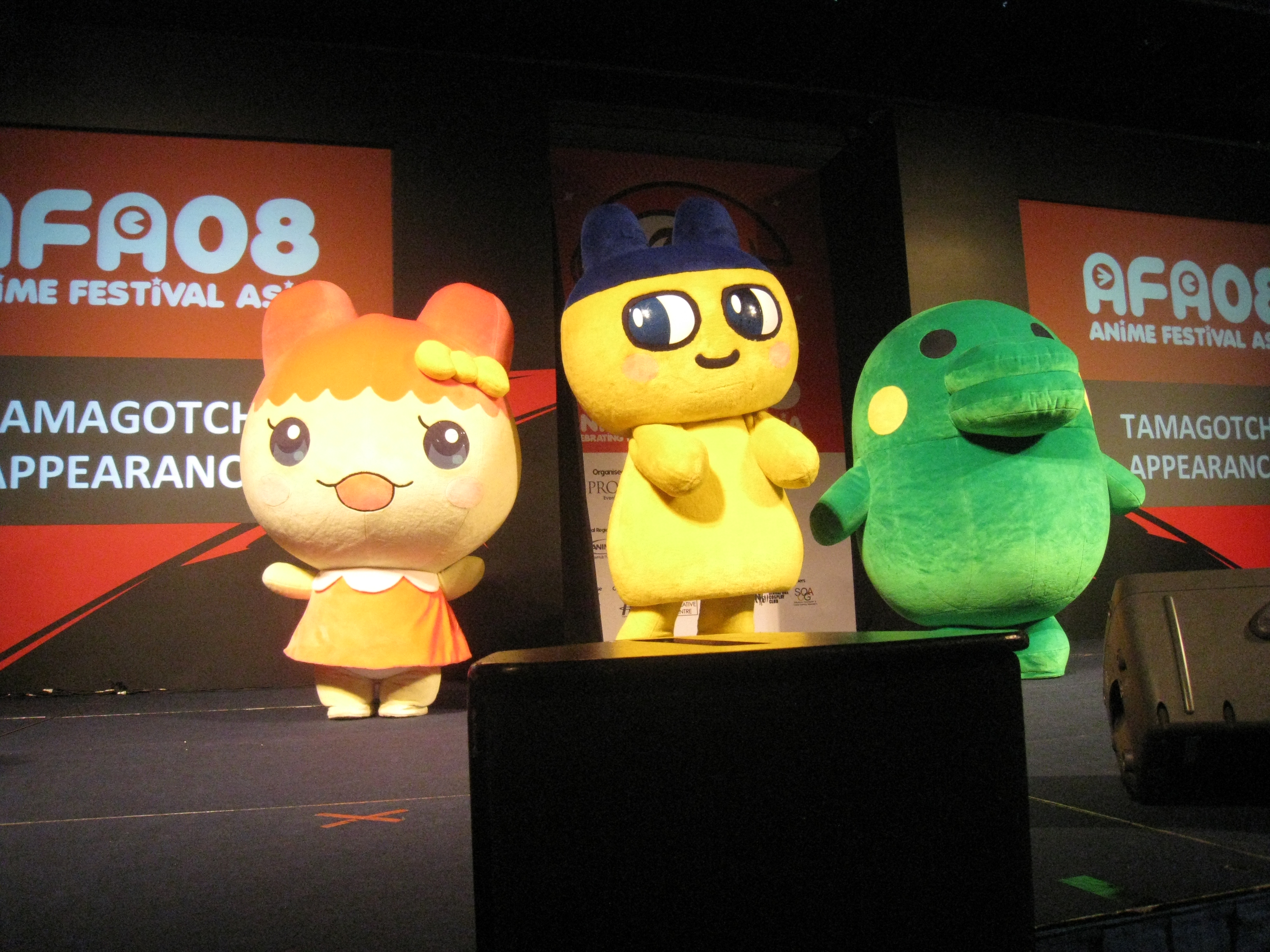
Tamagotchi character mascots at Anime Festival Asia, 2008.

This is a list of the characters in Tamagotchi, a Japanese media franchise created and owned by the toy company Bandai which originated as a series of electronic virtual pet toys.

== Boys ==
=== Mametchi ===
Mametchi - loyal, diligent and healthy, Mametchi was awake from 9 in the morning to 10 at night. You have to give your toy the best care to get him. He is a pale-yellow creature, most resembling a human, with dark blue ears and appears as a playable character in Mario Kart Arcade GP 2. Mametchi is also the mascot of the Tamagotchi franchise, and an unofficial mascot for Bandai as a whole. In animated media, he is voiced by Rie Kugimiya (in Japanese), and by Stephanie Sheh or Erica Mendez (in English).

== Girls ==
=== Memetchi ===
Memetchi is an orange Tamagotchi with sparkles in her eyes. She is very gentle, but when you are mean to her, she will point it out. She can get into arguments about fashion, as well. She is rivals with Makiko, a purple Tamagotchi who looks similar to her. Her care status often varies, but it is usually average. In animated media, she is voiced by Ryōka Yuzuki (in Japanese), and by Stephanie Sheh (in English).

=== Violetchi ===
In other languages and versions, she is known as 'Flowertchi', 'Furawatchi' or 'Leaftchi'. Violetchi is a calm Tamagotchi who is nice to everyone. She is purple (pink in Japan and some animated media), and has two flowers in her hair. The flower on the left is yellow and the one on the right is green. Violetchi and Memetchi are very close friends, they first meet by the boys' soccer ball hitting them. Her care status was formerly similar to Mametchi's, but it has now been reduced to average care. In animated media, she is voiced by Hinako Sasaki (in Japanese), and by Veronica Taylor (in English).

=== Lovelitchi/Lovelin ===
In other languages and versions, she is known as Raburitchi, Lavulitchi, or Lovelytchi.

Lovelitchi was introduced in the anime as a shy, kind, sweet girl who didn't know how to make friends, since she was bullied in the past for her celebrity status. She is best friends with some of the other central characters, including Mametchi, Memetchi, Kuchipatchi, as well as several other characters who know of her secret double-life under her stage name, Lovelin.

Lovelin is a pop star who is best known for several hit songs, such as the "Every Lovely" song, and several appearances in TV shows, such as her talk show "Lovelin's Corner" and her "30 Second Cooking Show". As Lovelin, she also appears alongside Gotchiman in his self-titled television show as his sidekick.

Lovelitchi has parents, Lovepapalitchi and Lovemamalitchi, who run the TamaCafe, and in the later anime series GO-GO Tamagotchi!, she gains a younger brother, Lovesoratchi. Uwasatchi is oblivious to the secret double identity. However, she wants to stir gossip about Lovelin and suspects Lovelitchi knows something about her.

Lovelitchi wears a pink dress with a blue bow, two sets of pink beads on her ears (with the set on her right having two pink hearts), blue tights and a pink purse shaped like a heart. Previously, she wore a blue dress with a light pink fluffy collar, blue bows on her ears, magenta tights and the same pink heart purse. Like Mametchi, she is usually obtained with the best possible care.

In animated media, she is voiced by voice actress and singer Kei Shindō (in Japanese).

== Adult characters ==
=== Kuchipatchi ===
Kuchipatchi was the most easily acquired Tamagotchi character. He is a green, fat Tamagotchi who likes to eat and sleep. He is one of the laziest Tamagotchis, but also one of the kindest. On virtual pets, he is mostly obtained with average or above-average care. In animated media, he is voiced by Asami Yaguchi (in Japanese), and by Carrie Keranen (in English).

=== Gozarutchi ===
Gozarutchi is a ninja character who is dark and secretive. He is always spying on someone. Not much is known about him. He wishes to become a Japanese ninja someday and can usually be found practicing his star throwing. In most releases, Gozarutchi is obtained with the worst possible care.

=== Mimitchi ===
She looks a lot like Mametchi but with bigger ears and she is white, not pale yellow. she is said to be related to Mametchi somehow. This character is a former main character and has been featured on all Tamagotchi versions since Plus. Mimitchi's care status is often compared to Mametchi's, as well.

=== Maskutchi ===
Debuted on the Japanese Tamagotchi Connection V2. She is a social group Tamagotchi who is very shy, but very polite. She has a white body and wears a red helmet with a white vertical line down it. She also uses her helmet to hide her true looks. Like Gozarutchi, she is usually obtained with the worst possible care.

=== Androtchi ===
Known as Robotchi in Japanese releases, this robot Tamagotchi is very clumsy. Sometimes people think he's a teenager, but he has been proven not to be one. He actually has human feelings, despite resembling a robot. His care status is often bad, but not the worst.

=== Kizatchi ===
Violetchi's younger brother. This Tamagotchi character cares for his older sister Violetchi and loves to sweet talk with lady Tamagotchi Characters.

=== Samuraitchi ===
Samuraitchi is described as a sincere character who always keeps his promises. He loves Japanese comedy TV shows and films, especially sumo wrestling.

=== KuroMametchi ===
A dark version of Mametchi. He is a rock star. He is not bad, but does not like to be around other people much and is misunderstood. This character's first appearance was on the TamaSuku, and he has appeared on many versions since. KuroMametchi is also a friendly rival with Mametchi. Makiko thinks he's brave, most of the girls like him, as well as Mametchi. KuroMametchi's care status is often compared to Mametchi's.

=== Shimashimatchi ===
A tiger character who somewhat looks like a bumblebee. Shimashimatchi likes everything that is stripey due to the fact that he's stripey as well. He collects all stripey things he can get his hands on. When he's angry, his body turns red with rage. His care status is often compared to Kuchipatchi's.

=== Petipuchi ===
One of the smallest Tamagotchi characters, Petipuchi is part of the petite family and has a boy or girl form. He is very energetic and always bouncing around.

=== Furikotchi ===
This character is a clock. Most of the time he announces the time correctly, but when he's too excited, he forgets what it is. At 5:00 P.M., he walks around Tama Town announcing that it is time for the children to come home from school.

=== Sunnytchi ===
A special character from the V5 who is a sun. He likes the sun, but, surprisingly, prefers indoor activities. His favorite phrase is "3-2-1, Sunnytchi!"

=== Hatugatchi ===
Hatugatchi is a green character with a leaf on his head. His favorite foods include beans and pudding. If this character is on Tamagotchi Connection Version 5 and is fed the sesame pudding, he will turn into KuroMametchi.

=== Chamametchi ===
Chamametchi is Mametchi's little sister. Like Mimitchi and KuroMametchi, she looks nothing like Mametchi, except for her skin color being pale yellow, as well as her ears. She has pink clothing, with a pink dress. Chamametchi's care status is often average.

=== Makiko ===
A purple light-bulb shaped character with curly pig-tails who wears a purple bow, a white skirt, and magenta boots. She is Memetchi's arch-rival. Although Makiko and Memetchi do not like each other, they are very fond of the curls in each other's hair. Makiko's care status often varies, usually either being better or worse than Memetchi, depending on the release.

=== Hapihapichi ===
A Tama-Pet of Chamametchi and Mametchi. Hapihapichi has the power to make people happy. She appears as a flying lamb.

Some other Tama-Pets include Bagubagutchi, Chitchi, Onsen-Moguratchi, and Hanatarezoutchi.
