= Tamagotchi Connection: Corner Shop 3 =

2007 video game

- European cover art, from left to right featuring Memetchi, Mametchi, Violetchi, and Kuchipatchi.
- Developers: NanaOn-Sha; Dimps
- Publishers: WW: Namco Bandai Games; AU: Atari
- Producer: Masaya Matsuura
- Series: Tamagotchi
- Platform: Nintendo DS
- Release: JP: September 27, 2007; NA: June 17, 2008; PAL: November 14, 2008
- Genres: Minigame collection, Life simulator game
- Mode: Single-player

Tamagotchi Connection: Corner Shop 3 (Note: Japanese: たまごっちのプチプチおみせっち みなサンきゅ～！, Hepburn: Tamagotchi no Puchi Puchi Omisecchi: Mina San Kyu!) is a 2007 shop simulation game developed by NanaOn-Sha and Dimps, and published by Namco Bandai Games and Atari for the Nintendo DS. It is the third entry in the Corner Shop series, following the release of Corner Shop 2 the previous year. The game was released in Japan on September 27, 2007, in North America on June 17, 2008, and in PAL regions on November 14, 2008.

Like the previous entries in the series, Corner Shop 3 focuses on running stores and serving customers via a variety of minigames. The game features light life simulation elements based on the Tamagotchi toy line, and introduced a new park feature, which lets players decorate and customize their own park.

The game received mixed reviews, with critics praising the game's presentation but criticizing the repetitiveness of the minigames. The game had lower sales compared to the previous two entries, selling under 250,000 units by the end of 2008. Corner Shop 3 was the last game in the Corner Shop series to be released outside of Japan for 17 years, until Tamagotchi Plaza was released worldwide in 2025.

== Gameplay ==
The Bakery-Gardening combination shop minigame. Violetchi converses with customers on the top screen while the player serves the customer via the bottom touchscreen

Similar to the rest of the series, Corner Shop 3 revolves around serving customer Tamagotchis in different stores via minigames. Players start the game by creating an ID card which includes their name, date of birth, and favorite color. After inputting these, the game randomly generates a Tamagotchi character tailored to the player's answers that may appear as a customer later. Four shops are available at the start of the game, including a recycling center, treasure hunt shop, greeting card shop, and gardening shop. At the start of the game, players choose a partner Tamagotchi between Mametchi, Memetchi, Kuchipatchi, and newcomer Violetchi. Players can also swap their partner Tamagotchi at any time, a first in the series. The goal of the game is to expand each shop to its maximum "Royal" rank. After each expansion, the shop will get physically taller. At the Royal rank, shops are four-stories high. Combination shops also return, with the Day Spa and Decoration Shops being combined after expanding high enough to form the Deco-Esthetics Decoration Day Spa. The second combination shop is a bakery-gardening center.

The game includes 13 shops, at the time the most in the series. All of the shops featured in Corner Shop 3 are new, with none returning from previous entries. In addition to the shops, Corner Shop 3 also offers a park that players can design and decorate with flowers, gardens, fountains, and other unlockable items. Players can also talk with other Tamagotchis in the garden area. In addition to the regular touchscreen-based gameplay, the DS' microphone is used in several minigames. Players sing into the microphone to calm crying babies at the day care centre, and sing to plants in the garden. New stores include a bakery, event coordinator, and an ice cream parlor. In the ice cream parlor, players use the stylus to create a sundae as requested by the customer, decorating the treat with sprinkles and cherries. After serving the customer, the player is given a score out of three based on their performance and receives Gotchi Points, the in-game currency. The player receives the same amount of points regardless of their performance, and the game does not feature any failure or game over mechanics. After successfully serving customers and receiving a sufficiently high rating, the mayor of Putchi Hill will arrive and offer to upgrade the shop. The minigames essentially remain the same when upgraded, becoming slightly more complex and difficult after each upgrade. In the rhythm minigame at the piano studio, shop upgrades give players access to more songs and increase the length and complexity of previously unlocked songs. In the Treasure Hunters minigame, players search for treasure using the stylus in a style similar to the Underground in Pokemon Diamond and Pearl. Players use a scanner to scan for valuable items, a pickax to dig for treasure, a chisel to chip away rocks, and finally brush the dust off by blowing into the DS's microphone. The sound effects are reused from previous games.

Similar to the first two entries, Corner Shop 3 features some optional life simulation elements where the player can provide gifts to their partner Tamagotchi including snacks and decorations for their room. In addition to decorating the character's room, the game also features a park that players can garden in and decorate. Rather than using Gotchi Points to purchase decorations for the garden, players play minigames to upgrade the garden's elements. One minigame involves purchasing seeds, and using the stylus to plant the seeds, cover them with soil, and water them. After exiting the minigame, players can see the plants grow in the corresponding planter in the park. To decorate the partner Tamagotchi's room and provide them with new clothes, players navigate to the garden's clock tower. Additionally, costumes purchased for the partner Tamagotchi can be worn while working in the shop. In previous games, partner Tamagotchi's would only wear their costumes in the Care mode.

Mametchi wearing a Postal Worker costume; Corner Shop 3 introduced outfit customization for in-store partner Tamagotchi

The game does not feature real-time multiplayer, but does allow players to create and share journals and items with one another via Nintendo Wi-Fi. Players can register information with up to 29 friends, and the registered friends Tamagotchis can appear in shops as customers, and in the park. Players can also create groups of up to four players and exchange journals together, circulating a single notebook between the four players.

== Plot ==
The player arrives on Tamagotchi Planet and travels to the town of Putchi Hill, where they meet the mayor. The player is tasked with helping struggling shopkeepers improve their stores and attract more customers. The player works alongside a partner Tamagotchi to revitalize the town's shops, expanding the stores and keeping customers and store owners alike happy.

== Development ==
Corner Shop 3 was developed by NanaOn-Sha and Dimps, who previously developed Corner Shop 2 together. The success of the first two Corner Shop games provided NanaOn-Sha the opportunity to continue developing for the DS. NanaOn-Sha began active development on Corner Shop 3 following the international release of the second game, with development ongoing as of April 2007. Localization manager, Nouaki Taguchi of Namco Bandai, stated that when developing Corner Shop 3 they wanted to introduce new features to the game while keeping the formula from the previous two games intact. To that end the team introduced new features like journal making, fortune telling, and park customization. Masaya Matsuura, head of NanaOn-Sha and producer of the first three Corner Shop games, described Corner Shop 3 as being more "sophisticated" than the previous entries.

== Release ==
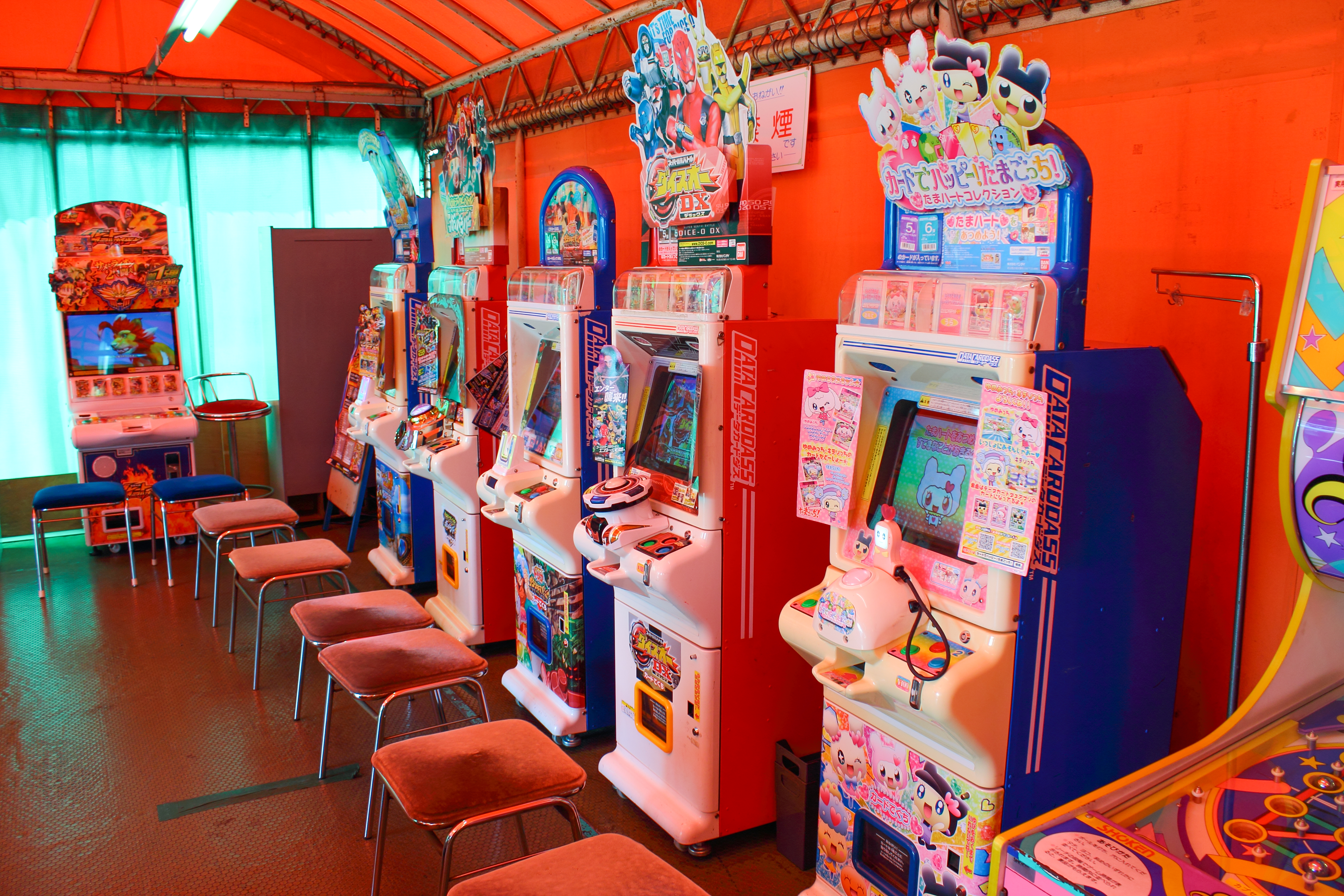
Various Data Carddass machines in 2012. A version released in 2007 could communicate wirelessly with Nintendo DS systems to distribute special items in Corner Shop 3.

Tamagotchi Connection: Corner Shop 3 was released in Japan on September 27, 2007. Following the game's Japanese release, promotions of the game were held through various means. At launch, a new Data Cardass machine, "DCD TamaCon", was introduced that could communicate with DS systems to gift players special items via trading cards. These machines, a card-based arcade system launched by Bandai and Banpresto in 2005, were commonly found in retail stores and amusement facilities. When a player connected their DS wirelessly to the machine, items were distributed based on the performance data of the most recent arcade game session. Once these items were transferred to the user's DS, they could purchase them using in-game Gotchi Points. The game also had a pre-order bonus in Japan, where purchases included a cosmetic pouch, mirror, and an item card that could be used with the TamaCon Data Cardass machine to receive a DS Lite in-game item.

Starting on November 27, 2007, a demo of the game was available in Japan via the newly launched Everybody's Nintendo Channel. This allowed players to download a demo of the game from their Nintendo Wii and send it to their DS via Download Play. In October, various Shogaku educational magazines provided tie-ins with the game. These magazines provided "secret codes" which could be used to unlock various in-game items, like a chocolate doughnut. Additionally, Toys "R" Us stores in Japan provided downloadable software for the game via DS Download Station kiosks. Bandai continued to promote the game through item distribution at DS Download Station kiosks from November 2007 to April 2008.

On January 7, 2008, Bandai Namco Games America Inc. announced that Corner Shop 3 would be getting a summer 2008 release in North America. On May 30th, the company announced that Corner Shop 3 had "gone gold". Corner Shop 3 released on June 17, 2008 in North America.

On May 12, 2008, Atari announced a European release of Corner Shop 3 for October that year, where it would be published by Namco Bandai Games' European branch and distributed by them. Despite being scheduled for October 2008, it ultimately released on November 14 the same year. ChartTrack director Dorian Bloch stated that the week of November 14th could be "one of the biggest launch weeks ever", with European releases of major titles like Gears of War 2, Call of Duty: World at War, World of Warcraft: Wrath of the Lich King, LittleBigPlanet, Mirror's Edge, and Football Manager all releasing the same week.

On June 12, 2008, Atari announced that Corner Shop 3 would be getting a release in Australia and New Zealand in October of that year.

== Reception ==
Reception

Aggregate scores
Aggregator	Score
GameRankings	61%
Metacritic	57/100

Review scores
Publication	Score
GameZone	5/10
IGN	5.7/10

Tamagotchi Connection: Corner Shop 3 holds an aggregate score of 57/100 from review aggregator platform Metacritic, indicating mixed reviews. Like previous games in the series, praise was mostly directed toward the games presentation, and criticism was directed toward the repetitive nature of the minigames. Praise was also directed toward the game's writing.

AJ Glasser of GamesRadar+ called Corner Shop 3 "the same super-cute addictive game we know and love- with more of what we want". Writing for GameZone, Michael Stadler called the game charming and praised the sound design and presentation, while noting that the game's visuals were not on-par with some contemporary DS games. Critics reiterated series complaints that the game will not hold the interest many people for long, especially for adults. Writing for IGN, Jack DeVries wrote that to this point, each title in the Corner Shop series had only added unsubstantial changes, and that the third game was essentially the same as the first two with a different set of minigames. DeVries also noted that the virtual pet aspect of the game was lacking, noting that despite being able to dress Kuchipatchi "like one of the droogs from A Clockwork Orange", this aspect had no impact on gameplay. DeVries also commented that the game suffers from a lack of consistently high quality minigames, with some being more engaging than others. He also stated that the upgrades of the various shops ranged from enjoyable to uninteresting.

Tamagotchi Connection: Corner Shop 3 debuted on the Japanese sales charts at number four, selling 54,000 units in its first week. The game managed to sell 204,744 units in the country by the end of 2007, ranking as the 81st best selling game in Japan for the year. In 2008 the game sold an additional 45,086 copies in Japan, reaching a total of 249,830 units sold. Gamasutra stated that Corner Shop 3 failed to repeat the sales success of the first game in the series.

== Sequels ==
The game received five Japan-only sequels, with two on the DS and three on the 3DS. Seventeen years after the release of Corner Shop 3, Tamagotchi Plaza released worldwide for the Nintendo Switch and Switch 2 in June 2025, making it the first game in the series to be released outside of Japan since Corner Shop 3.
