= Tamagotchi =

Digital pet toy brand

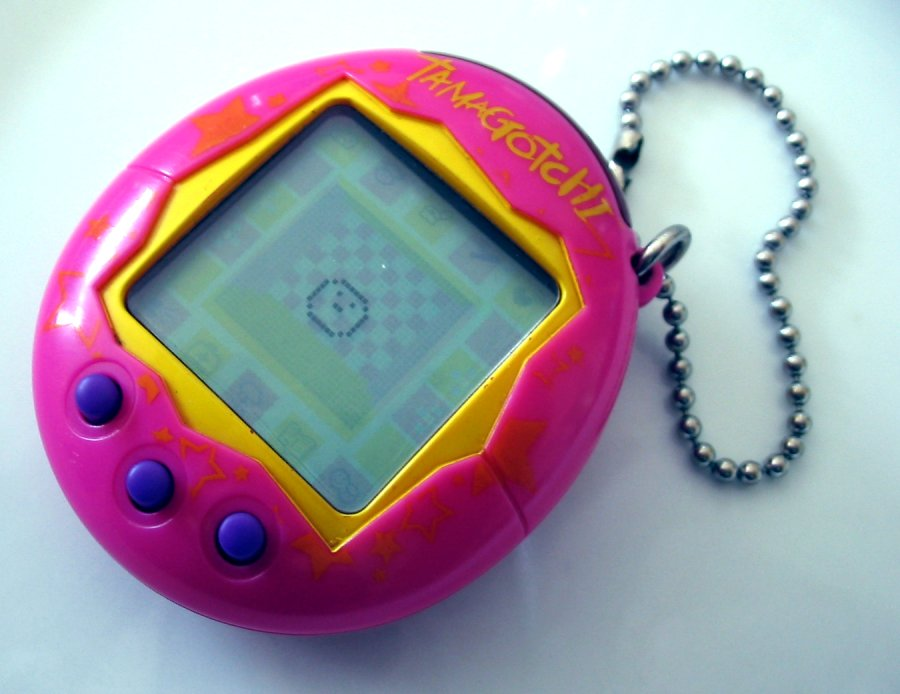
- Tamagotchi Connection V1, released in 2004
- Type: Virtual pet (Handheld electronic game)
- Invented by: Akihiro Yokoi and Aki Maita
- Company: WiZ and Bandai (Bandai is part of the Bandai Namco group)
- Country: Japan
- Availability: 1996–present
- Official website

Current logo of the Tamagotchi brand

Tamagotchi (Japanese: たまごっち; IPA: [tamaɡotꜜtɕi], "Egg Watch") is a brand of handheld digital pets marketed since 1996 by Japanese toymaker Bandai, a division of Bandai Namco Holdings. Most Tamagotchi are housed in a small egg-shaped handheld video game with an interface consisting of three buttons, with the goal of raising the pet as it goes through different life stages.

The original Tamagotchi, released locally in 1996 and worldwide in 1997, quickly became a major global toy fad for a period of time. Tamagotchi was brought back in 2004 and since then has received more new versions while Bandai has also expanded the franchise to other media and merchandise. As of 2025, over 98 million units have been sold worldwide. It has been a staple children's toy in Japan since its early years.

According to Bandai, the name is a portmanteau combining the two Japanese words tamago (たまご), which means "egg", and uotchi (ウオッチ) "watch". After the original English spelling of watch, the name is sometimes romanized as Tamagotch without the "i" in Japan. Most Tamagotchi characters' names end in tchi or chi (ち) in Japanese. "Mametchi", present since the original release, became a mascot of sorts for the series.

== History ==
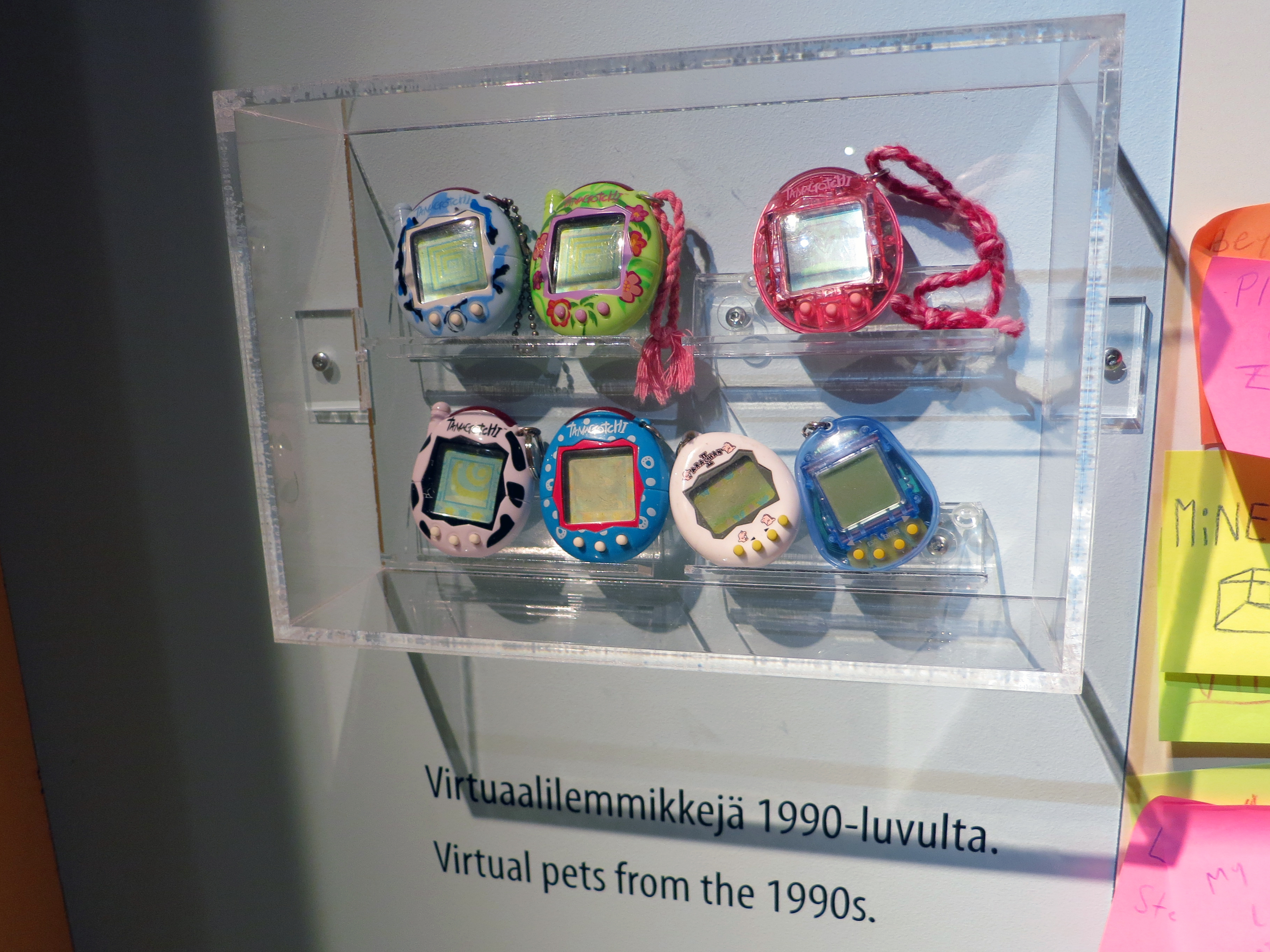
Tamagotchis on display at the Rupriikki Media Museum in Tampere, Finland

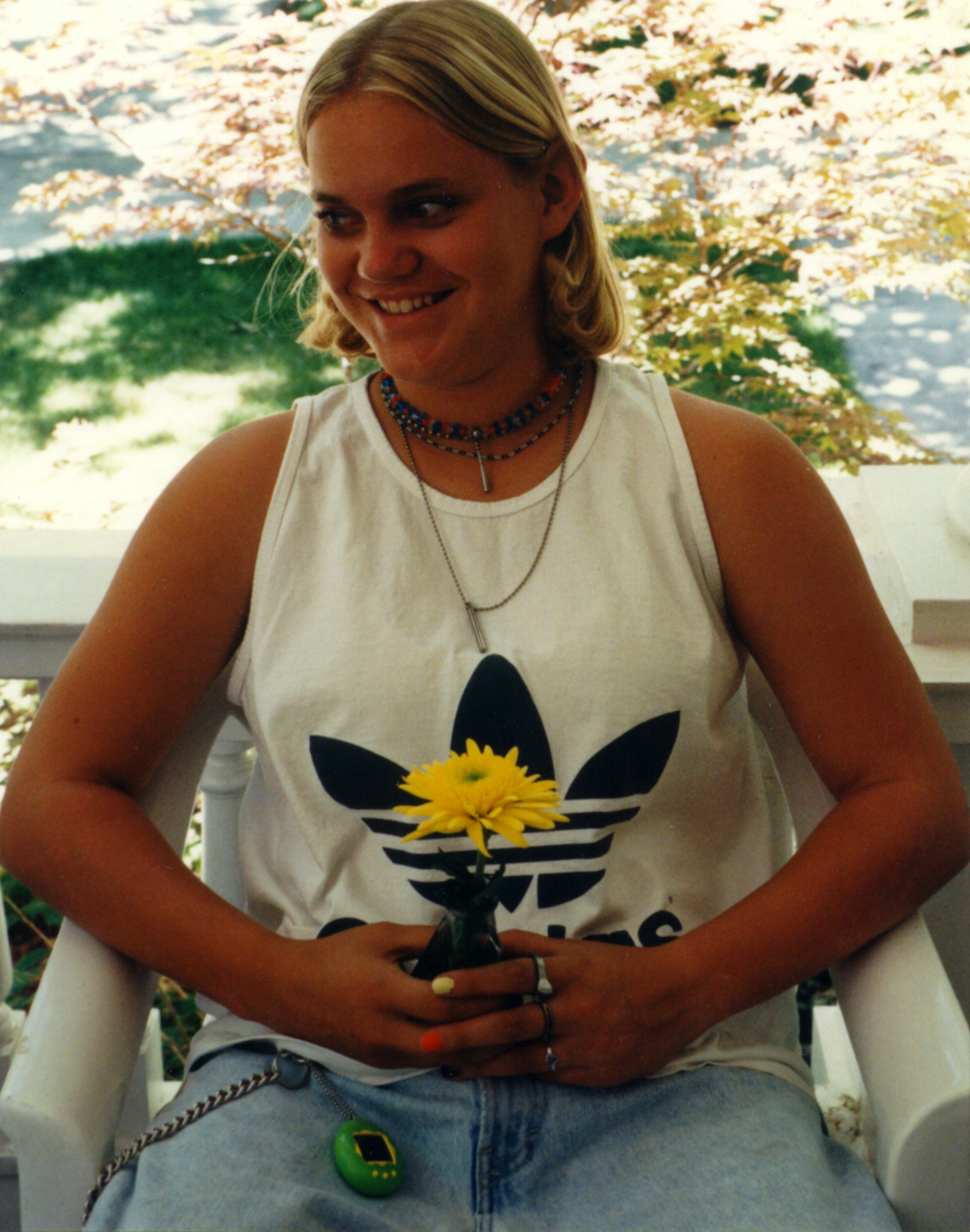
A girl with her Tamagotchi chained to her pocket, 1997

Tamagotchi was created in Japan by Akihiro Yokoi of WiZ and Aki Maita of Bandai. They both won the tongue-in-cheek 1997 Ig Nobel Prize for economics, dubbing them the father and mother of Tamagotchi. The first Tamagotchi was released by Bandai on November 23, 1996 (several months after the release of the unsuccessful Apple Pippin console) in Japan. It would then release in the United States on May 1, 1997. Tamagotchi is a keychain-sized virtual pet simulation game. The characters were first drawn in heta-uma, which was a popular style found in teen magazines, and were then converted to pixel art. They were worn like a wristwatch in the initial concept, hence the portmanteau name. The egg shape might have been chosen as it was meant to resemble a pocket watch. The characters are colorful creatures with simple designs based on animals, objects, or people. When releasing the Tamagotchi in Japan, Bandai initially marketed them exclusively to teenage girls. Bandai and WiZ would later create a masculine counterpart to the Tamagotchi, the Digital Monster, which would spawn the Digimon franchise.

The original Tamagotchi sold about 40 million units worldwide during its run, including about 12 million in the US and Canada. The large success of the toy was a surprise for Bandai. But the company was also ill-prepared as it struggled to keep up with demand. At one point, Bandai employees were banned from carrying bags showing the Bandai logo in fear of theft as it was a sought after item. The Tamagotchi craze faded by 1998 and because of large overproduction of the toys that remained unsold (partly caused by miscommunication and that customers made reservations at multiple different retailers), Bandai made a 6 billion yen financial loss.

Bandai revived the Tamagotchi toys in 2004 with the Tamagotchi Connection, a new Tamagotchi with the ability to connect and interact with other Tamagotchi using infrared. In a bid to avoid repeating the mistakes of the original, the company released the new Tamagotchi carefully with subdued advertising. The new generation Tamagotchi became a popular toy in Japan and other regions in the mid-2000s. The brand's revival and popularity was further seen with the success of the Tamagotchi-based Nintendo DS video game Tamagotchi Connection: Corner Shop which sold 1 million copies in Japan by January 2006.

Bandai updated the Connection series with new models for several years and have since then expanded the Tamagotchi with further new versions with additional features to this day. (V1-V5)

== Gameplay ==
Tamagotchis are a small alien species that deposited an egg on Earth to see what life was like, and it is up to the player to raise the egg into an adult creature. On the original Tamagotchi, the creature goes through several stages of growth, and will develop differently depending on the care the player provides, with better care resulting in an adult creature that is smarter, happier, and requires less attention. There are various Tamagotchi characters (the original models have six adult characters and two at the teenager stage) and the resulting character depends on how the player has cared for it during the earlier baby, child and teen stages. Gameplay can vary widely between models, and some models require little care from the player.

Upon activating the pet, an egg appears on the screen. After setting the clock on the device, the egg will wiggle for around 5~ minutes, and then hatch into a small pet. In versions after the original Tamagotchi, inputting the player's name and birthday is also required when setting the clock, and at birth, the player can name the pet and learn of its family group and/or gender. The player can care for the pet as much or as little as they choose, and the outcome depends on the player's actions. The original Tamagotchi could only be paused by going to set the clock, effectively stopping the passage of time in the game, but in later models, a pause function was included, then replaced by a paid babysitting feature.

Pets have a Hunger meter, Happy meter and a Training meter to determine how healthy and well-behaved the pet is. There is also an age and weight check function for the current age and weight of the pet. Filling up the Hunger meter can be achieved by feeding the pet a meal (usually a loaf of bread or hamburger) or a snack (usually a piece of candy or cake). Filling up the Happy meter can be achieved by playing mini-games with the pet or by feeding it a snack (there are no limits to this, at the cost of weight, but there are limits to how many meals can be fed). Mini-games usually vary between versions. The Training meter (formerly called Discipline in earlier releases) can be filled by pressing the "scold" (later called "Timeout" and "Praise" on the Tamagotchi connection.) option when a pet calls for attention despite neither its hunger or happy meter being empty, calls for attention but refuses to play or be fed a meal and in later models, sending a prank gift to a friend. The pet will leave droppings around the screen from time to time and can become sick if they are not cleaned up. Before the pet goes to the bathroom, it will make a face and "stink" lines will appear around it. If the player activates the toilet icon during this animation, before the pet has gone to the bathroom, the pet will use a toilet instead. When done repeatedly, the pet can be potty trained, and will use the toilet on its own.

If the pet gets sick, a skull icon appears next to the pet as it sits still at the bottom of the screen, with an unhappy expression. The pet can become sick for a number of reasons, such as overfeeding of snacks or failing to clean up droppings. The pet can die if sickness is left unchecked. The pet can be cured by pressing the "Medicine" option; however, it may need to be pressed more than once. Usually, a pet will not play or accept a meal when sick.

=== Life cycle ===
The pet goes through several distinct stages of development throughout its life cycle. Each stage lasts a set amount of days, depending on the model of the toy, and when it reaches a new stage, the toy plays a jingle, and the pet's appearance changes. The pet can "die" due to poor care, old age, sickness, and in a few versions, predators. The pet's life cycle stages are Baby, Child, Teenager, Adult, and Special, with some units also having a Senior stage. Usually, the pet's age will increase once it has awakened from its sleep time.

Poor care can cause a pet to die, but on certain releases, it can also die of old age. If an old pet dies without producing offspring, the family line has ended. The Japanese Tamagotchi toys usually feature a ghost and headstone when the pet dies, but English language versions have been changed to show an angel at death. There is sometimes more than one death based on how well the pet was cared for prior to death. Pressing the C button shows the age at which the pet died. After the pet dies, a player can restart the game by pressing the A and C buttons at the same time.

== Additional features ==
On top of the basic gameplay premises mentioned above, some Tamagotchis have additional features.

=== Connectivity ===
Using infrared communication, two players can link their toys and the pets may form friendships, play games, exchange gifts, and even marry. Connectivity was introduced with Osutchi and Mesutchi, which used physical prongs to connect the "male" and "female" devices. The Japanese Keitai Kaitsuu Tamagotchi Plus was the first model to feature support for an online app. Since then, many subsequent models have also been able to interact with apps like Tamatown by using alphanumeric codes generated by the toy to log into the website's Flash game. After generating a code, the toy remains paused until the player either enters a logout code or cancels. The player may play minigames in the town to earn Gotchi Points, or use Gotchi Points to buy items in the town shops. To transfer points and items back to the toy, the player signs out of the Flash game and is given a code to input back into the toy. The Tamagotchi Connection series used infrared to connect devices. Newer models, such as the Tamagotchi 4U and the Tamagotchi 4U+ can connect to other Tamagotchi 4U units, as well as smartphones and tablets, using near-field communication. More new releases continued to expand on connectivity options, with the Tamagotchi Pix using QR codes, and the Tamagotchi Paradise returning to physical prongs at the top of the device for cross-device connection, harkening back to the original Osutchi and Mesutchi connecting style.

=== Marriage and family ===
The Mesutchi and Osutchi Tamagotchis were the first to introduce marriages and offspring, and the feature returned in the Plus/Connection and subsequent models. Two players with a male and female pet may link their toys and allow the pets to develop a friendship and fall in love. Once the pets have raised their relationship meter sufficiently, the pets may marry. The player can also choose to have their pet marry a random pet brought in by the "Matchmaker". Once married, the female will eventually produce two eggs, keeping one and leaving one with the male. Since the parent will automatically guide the baby's life, the only care it needs from the player is medicine in the case of sickness. After 24 hours has passed or the offspring evolves into a child the parent will leave, and the player is left to care for a new generation. This can continue for as long as the player manages to care for the pets.

The Chou Jinsei Enjoy Tamagotchi also introduced the idea of character "families" or "groups". These "families" are a kind of classification for characters obtainable in the game, grouped mainly by appearance, though they are also associated with certain skills. A character of one group cannot grow into an adult of a different group, and if two pets of different groups marry and have an egg, the baby will be of the female's group.

Tamagotchi Some, M!x, and On are notable in that the Tamagotchi offspring will share genetics from both of their parents. Tamagotchi Paradise also features a scaled down level of gene-mixing through breeding.

=== Other ===
With the many different versions of the toy, there are other less common mechanics that influence the pet's growth, including but not limited to friendship with the player, varying types of skills, and career. The Chou Jinsei Enjoy Tamagotchi also introduced Skills, which can be built by playing certain games with the pet, or using certain toys or foods bought from the E-Tamago or in-game shops. Having certain skills can help the pet obtain a career, and if built up high enough, can unlock special characters.

Some recent models such as Tamagotchi On features the player earns currency called Gotchi Points while playing games, and can use the currency in an in-game shop to buy different foods, toys, accessories, or even room decorations for the pet.

The Tamagotchi Pix has a camera installed, allowing the user to get a pet based on the skin tone and age of the face; it also allows the user to take pictures and "take" the pet on a walk. The Tamagotchi Pix is also one of the first and only devices to use the QR code connection feature.

== Releases ==
Release timeline * only released in Japan
1996	Tamagotchi
1997	Tamagotchi Angel
1998	Tamagotchi Ocean
1998	* Mori de Hakken! Tamagotchi
1999
2000
2001
2002
2003
2004	Tamagotchi Connection
2005	* Tamagotchi Mini
2006	* Tamagotchi School
2006	* Tamagotchi Music Fever
2007	* TamagoChu
2007	* Tamagotchi Restaurant
2008	* Tamagotchi Plus Color
2008	Tamawalkie
2008	Tamagotchi Music Star
2009	* Tamagotchi iD
2010	Tamagotchi Nano
2010	TamaTown Tama-Go
2011
2012	* Tamagotchi P's
2013
2014	* Tamagotchi 4U
2014	Tamagotchi Friends
2015
2016	* Tamagotchi m!x
2017
2018
2019	Tamagotchi ON
2020
2021	Tamagotchi Pix
2021	* Tamagotchi Smart
2022
2023	Tamagotchi Uni
2024
2025	Tamagotchi Paradise

At least 50 different Tamagotchi versions have been released since their creation, several of which were only released in Japan.

=== Original Tamagotchi ===
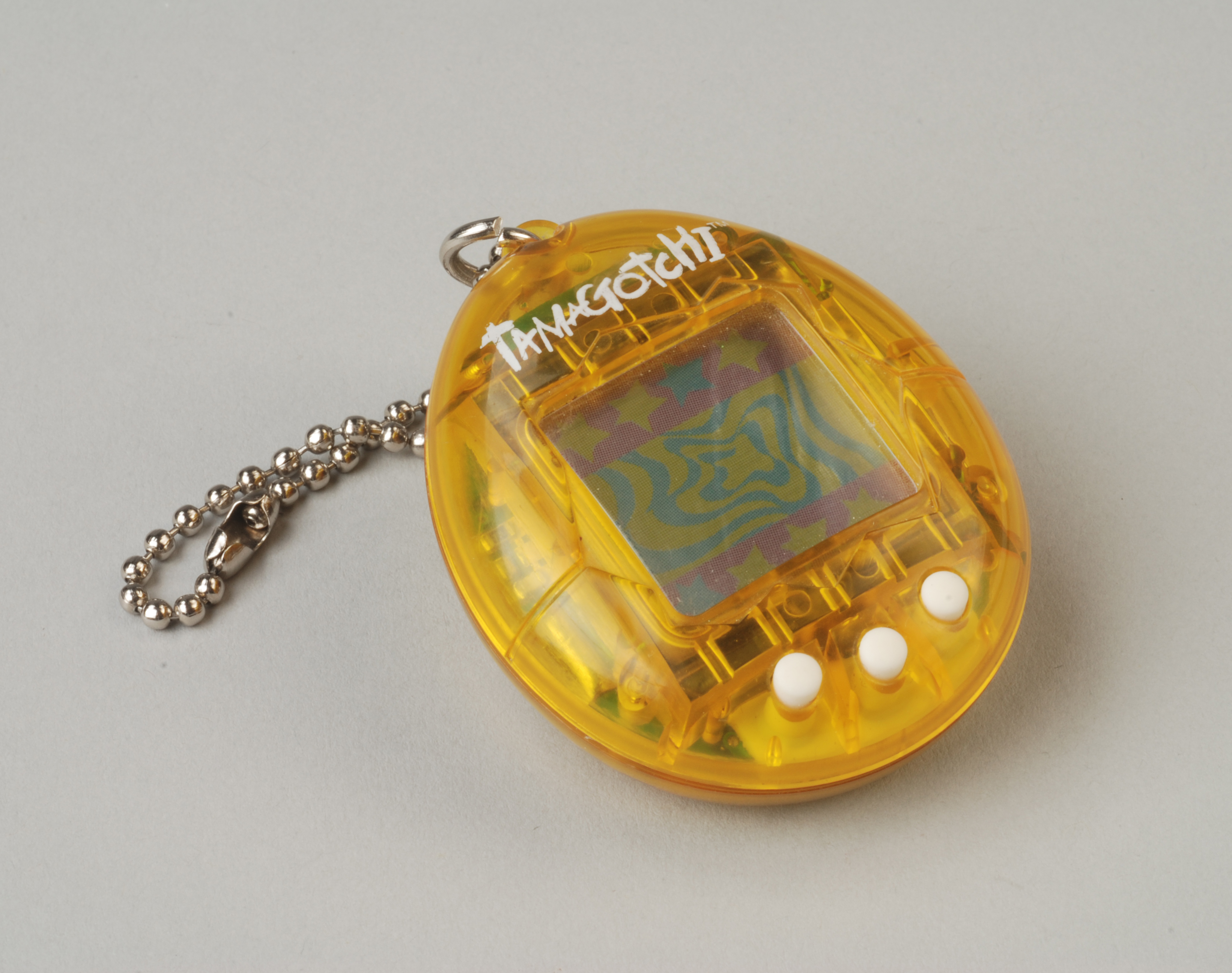
A yellow second generation Tamagotchi

The original Tamagotchi was released on November 23, 1996, first in Japan and elsewhere in 1997. The device has an 8-bit (256 shades) grayscale LCD. A second version named New Species Discovered! was released in February 1997 both in Japan and internationally. These are now officially named by Bandai as the 'Generation 1' and 'Generation 2', respectively. The two have some minor differences: Generation 1 features Mametchi as the top character and the Character minigame, while Generation 2 features the character Mimitchi and the Number minigame.

This first wave of Tamagotchi toys later also included other themed versions with altered gameplay and characters. Most were released in Japan only, but two were also released in the United States, namely the Tamagotchi Angel (in February 1998), which puts a twist to the regular premise as it features an angel that comes back to earth after death, and Tamagotchi Ocean (in August 1998) which is set underwater. The final Tamagotchi to be released was the Santa Claus-themed Santaclauchi in November 1998 in Japan.

Bandai Namco re-released the Original Tamagotchi (both Gen 1 and Gen 2) on November 23, 2017, in Japan and other regions in 2018 as part of the toy's 20th anniversary. It is an exact replica of the original but comes in new colors. Since then, the company have continued to expand the Original Tamagotchi range with new colors and designs. In January 2025, Bandai Namco re-released the Tamagotchi Angel, which is now classified as the 'Generation 3' Original Tamagotchi.

Also to celebrate the twentieth anniversary of the toy, Bandai released internationally a miniature version of the Gen 1 and 2 Tamagotchi in November 2017 that is approximately 40 percent smaller often referred to as Tamagotchi Mini. Miniature versions were already released before in Japan called 'Chibi Tamagotchi'.

=== Tamagotchi Connection ===
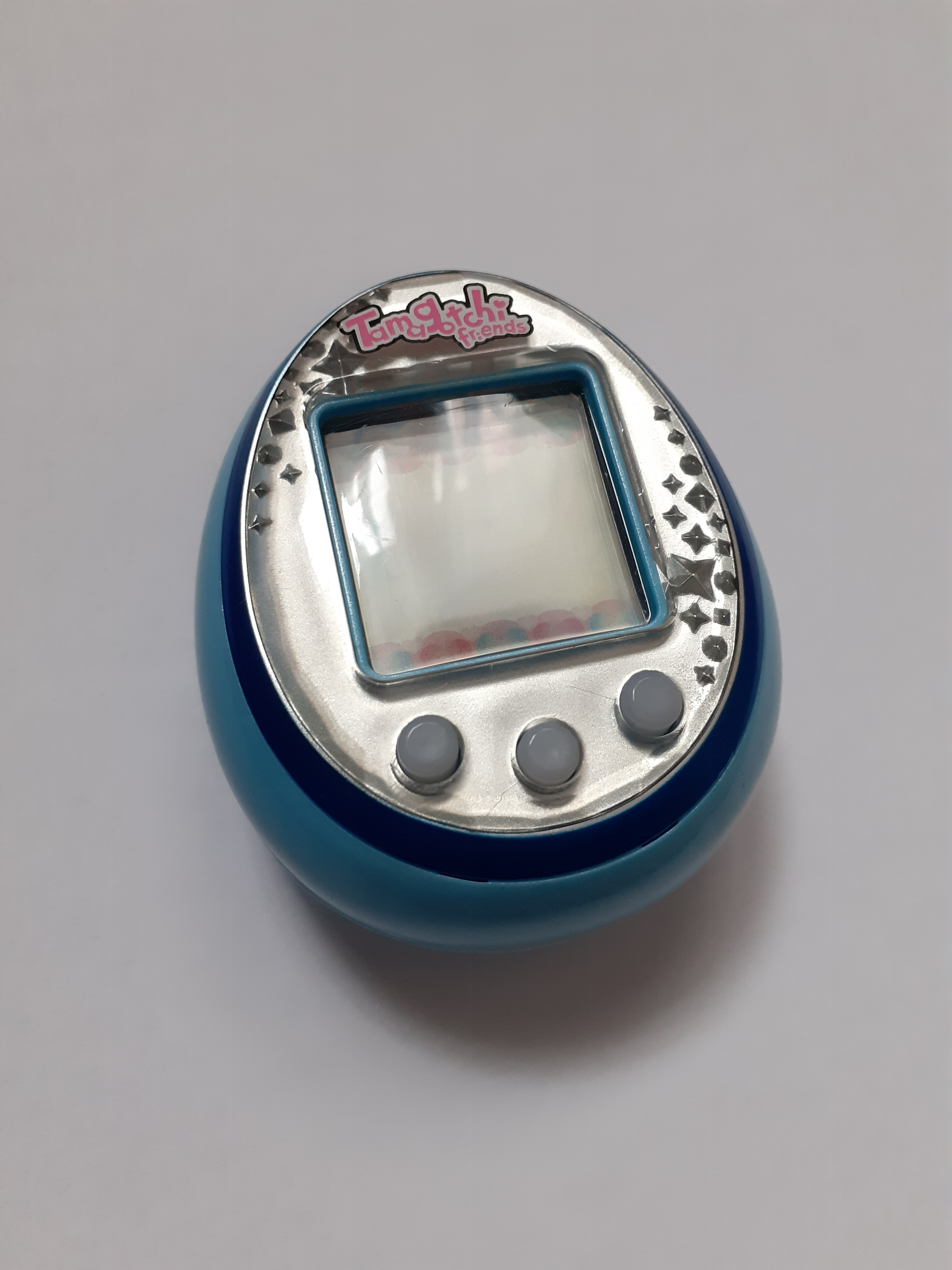
Tamagotchi Friends, the eighth version of the Tamagotchi Connection line, released in 2013-2014

The Tamagotchi Connection (also known as Tamagotchi Plus) is the rebooted Tamagotchi series that was originally released in Japan in March 2004 and internationally later that year. These feature a different graphic design by artist JINCO and gameplay which elaborated upon the first generations including the ability of connecting with other Tamagotchis through IrDA infrared technology and make babies. However, the story and concept behind the games remained the same.

Bandai released many newer versions of the Tamagotchi Connection series. The third version, released in 2006, also added an online gameplay element with the TamaTown website. In 2010 the TamaTown Tama-Go was released that gave the ability to attach physical collectible figures of Tamagotchis called Gotchi Figures. The last of the original Connection series to be released in the US was Tamagotchi Friends in 2014.

The Tamagotchi Connection was re-released in 2024 to celebrate its twentieth anniversary.

=== Color Tamagotchi ===
On November 22, 2008, the first color screen Tamagotchi was released, only in Japan, the Tamagotchi Plus Color, it has additional gameplay features and Bandai made further new color Tamagotchi over coming years in Japan including the Tamagotchi iD (2009), Tamagotchi P's (2012), Tamagotchi 4U (2014) and Tamagotchi m!x (2016).

The first color Tamagotchi to be released internationally was the Tamagotchi ON (known as Tamagotchi Meets in Japan) in July 2019. It was also one off the first Tamas to feature character feature mixing after marriage. Useful sources: MyMeets (a version of the app that was initially shut down). This version can also connect to a smartphone using Bluetooth wireless technology.

The Tamagotchi Pix was released in 2021 which has a built-in camera giving the ability to take augmented reality (AR) pictures with the user's Tamagotchi.

Tamagotchi Smart was released in 2021 and was the first smartwatch form factor Tamagotchi model. It was only available in Japan and uses physical cards for expansions with new characters and items.

Tamagotchi Uni was released internationally in July 2023. It was the first Tamagotchi to feature Wi-Fi. It is made in a smartwatch form factor and can use its new Wi-Fi feature to connect to an online environment called Tamaverse. A 2024 update added the ability to get DLC over Wi-Fi, for expansion packs with new characters, items and mini-games.

Tamagotchi Paradise is a new Tamagotchi device released internationally in July 2025 and later released in the United States in August 2025. It features a zoom dial. Over time the Tamagotchi has morphed into a sort of little person you raise. However, the Tamagotchi Paradise has reverted to a little pet of sorts, much to the delight of fans.

=== Special and licensed Tamagotchis ===
Bandai has also released various special editions of "Tamagotchi Nano" licensed from other media and franchises. Most of these were released in Japan but some have also been marketed internationally, especially in the 2020s. Examples of these Tamagotchis include ones based on characters and franchises such as Gudetama, Neon Genesis Evangelion, Hello Kitty (to celebrate its 50th anniversary in 2024), Pac-Man (to celebrate its 40th anniversary in 2020) and Jurassic World.

== Marketing and other media ==
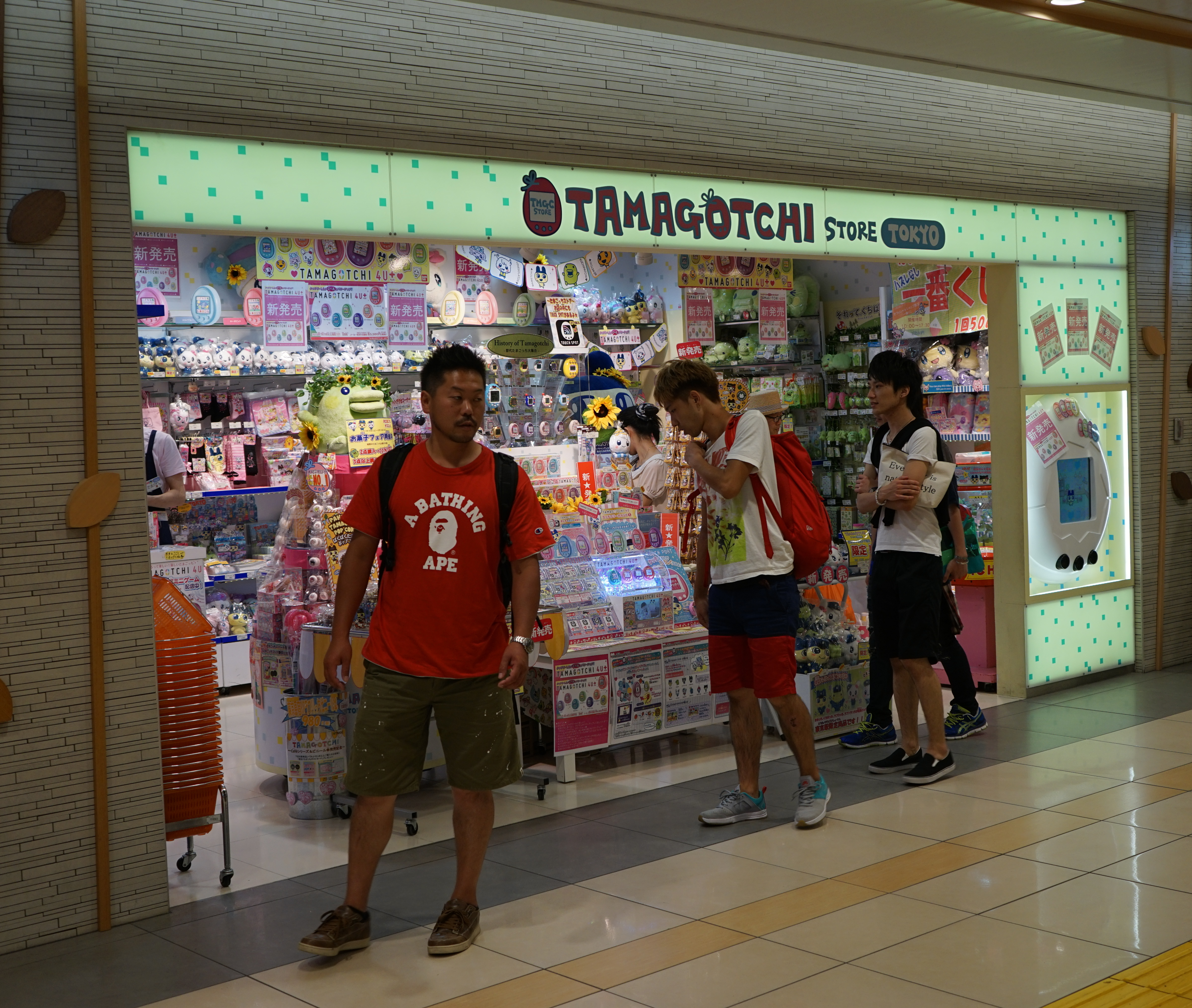
Tamagotchi Store

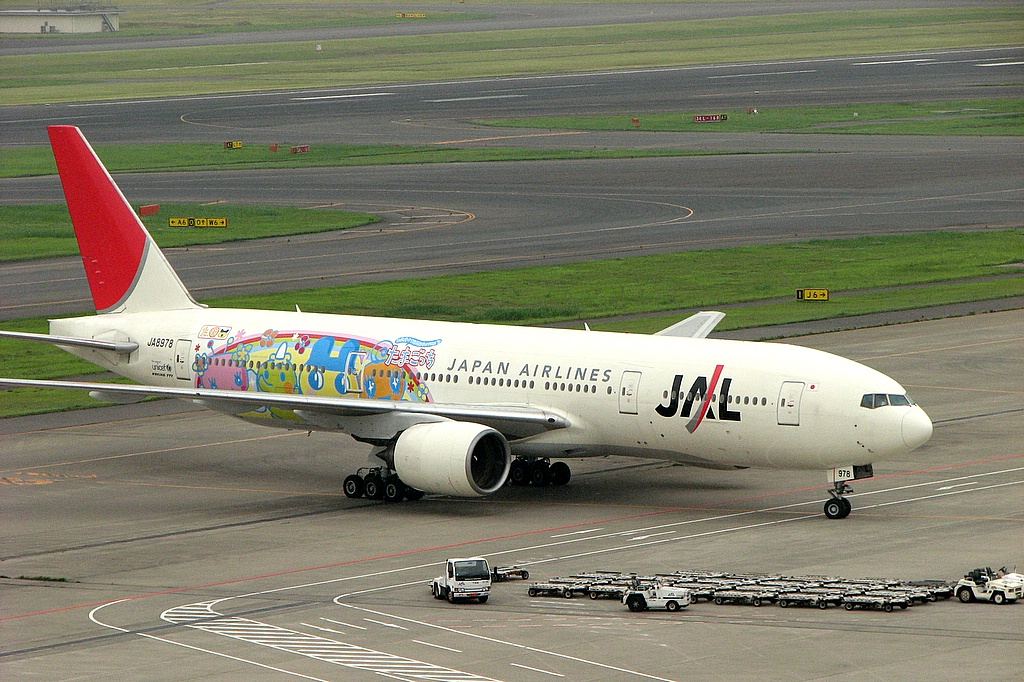
A Japan Airlines Boeing 777 painted with a Tamagotchi theme in 2006

=== Video games ===
Since its debut, Tamagotchi has also made its way onto several gaming platforms. Several early games feature gameplay similar to the original toys: an enhanced version of the original 1996/1997 Tamagotchi would be released for mobile phones as a Java game in 2005, then in 2013 as an iOS and Android app named "Tamagotchi L.i.f.e.".

A few party-style games appeared on major consoles, along with the Corner Shop series of simulation games and a few role-playing games for the Nintendo DS. An arcade machine known as Deka Tamagotchi is available in Japan from which players can win prizes for their Tamagotchi toy.

The character Mametchi makes an appearance in Namco Bandai/Nintendo's Mario Kart Arcade GP 2 as a playable character, along with his pet, Bagubagutchi, as an item. Mametchi and Yumemitchi also appeared in the arcade game Taiko no Tatsujin as unlockable costumes.

Console and handheld games based on Tamagotchi
Game	Device	Distribution	Release	Sales
Tamagotchi	Game Boy	International	1997	3,000,000
Game de Hakken!! Tamagotchi V2	Game Boy	Japan	1997	5,450,000
Game de Hakken!! Tamagotchi Osutchi to Mesutchi	Game Boy	Japan	1997	
Tamagotchi 64: Minna de Tamagotchi World	Nintendo 64	Japan	1997	
Hoshi de Hakken!! Tamagotchi	PlayStation	Japan	1998	
Sega Saturn de Hakken!! Tamagotchi Park	Sega Saturn	Japan	1998	
Tamagotchi Town	Super Famicom	Japan	1999	
Tamagotchi Connection: Corner Shop	Nintendo DS	International	2005	
Tamagotchi Connection: Corner Shop 2	Nintendo DS	International	2006	
Tamagotchi: Party On!	Wii	International	2006	
Tamagotchi Connection: Corner Shop 3	Nintendo DS	International	2007	
Tamagotchi no Furifuri Kagekidan	Wii	Japan	2007	
Tamagotchi no Narikiri Channel	Nintendo DS	Japan	2009	
Tamagotchi no Narikiri Challenge	Nintendo DS	Japan	2010	
Tamagotchi Collection	Nintendo DS	Japan	2011	
Ouchi Mainichi Tamagotchi	Nintendo 3DS	Japan	2012	
Tamagotchi Plaza	Nintendo Switch, Nintendo Switch 2	International	2025	

Mobile and PC games based on Tamagotchi
Game	OS/Device	Distribution	Release	Sales
Tamagotchi CD-ROM	Macintosh, Pippin, Windows 95	International	1997	50,000
Tamagotchi	Java (mobile phones)	Europe	2005	
Tamagotchi Soccer	Java (mobile phones)		2006	
Tamagotchi Angel	Java (mobile phones)		2007	
Tamagotchi Monster	Java (mobile phones)		2008	
Tamagotchi L.I.F.E.	Android, iPod Touch, iPad, iPhone,		2013	
Tamagotchi L.I.F.E. Angel	Android, iPod Touch, iPad, iPhone		2013	
Tamagotchi L.I.F.E. Tap and Hatch	Android, iPod Touch, iPad, iPhone		2013	
Tamagotchi Classic -Original-	Android, iPod Touch, iPad, iPhone		2015	
My Tamagotchi Forever	Android, iPod Touch, iPad, iPhone		2018	
Tamagotchi Adventure Kingdom	Apple TV, iPad, iPhone, macOS	Apple Arcade	2024	

=== Film ===
On June 5, 2007, it was announced by Reuters that an animated Tamagotchi film was to be released in December 2007. The film, Tamagotchi: The Movie, focuses on Mametchi, along with his friends Memetchi and Kuchipatchi. Introduced are Tanpopo, a human girl who Mametchi accidentally transports to the Tamagotchi Planet; and Chamametchi, the younger sister of Mametchi, who is born during the film's events. Tamagotchi: The Movie was released on December 15, 2007, and was distributed by Toho Co. The film opened at number 3 at the box office on opening weekend. On May 31, 2008, North American distributor Bandai Entertainment announced they had acquired the rights to the film. The movie's first English release was a direct-to-DVD version, released on June 3, 2009, in Australia by Madman Entertainment. The UK DVD was released on September 14, 2009, via Manga Entertainment.

On December 20, 2008, a second film, known as Tamagotchi: Happiest Story in the Universe! was released into theaters. This film, introducing a new Tamagotchi known as Hapihapitchi, was later released on DVD, on June 26, 2009. Unlike the first film, no English dub was ever released on any home video formats, but an English dub aired on television in the Philippines. Madman Entertainment intended to dub Happiest Story in the Universe!, but the dub was cancelled for unknown reasons.

On November 1, 2016, Bandai announced a new Tamagotchi short film called Tamagotchi: Secret Delivery Operation. The film was theatrically released alongside the Kamisama Minarai: Himitsu no Cocotama film on April 28, 2017, and was included in the Cocotama movie's DVD released on December 6, 2017. The short film once again follows Mametchi and his friends, assigned to make an essential delivery to the Gotchi King when a giant mechanical claw controlled by the Spacy Brothers intervenes with the delivery.

In the 2022 film Turning Red, which was set in 2002, the main protagonist Meilin "Mei" Lee owns a Tamagotchi that she names "Robaire Junior", after one of the members of her favorite band. This was inspired by director Domee Shi's desire to have a Tamagotchi when she was younger.

=== Anime ===
A Japanese-only anime series called Anime TV de Hakken!! Tamagotchi (アニメ TVで発見!! たまごっち, lit. "Found on Anime TV!! Tamagotchi") aired from July 7, 1997, to March 21, 1998, on Fuji TV.

In December 2007, Bandai Japan began airing Saa Ikō! Tamagotchi (さぁイコー！たまごっち) a week before the release of the first film. In December 2008, Bandai America dubbed the series, Let's Go! Tamagotchi, and began streaming it on YouTube in both English and Japanese, with captions for up to seven other languages.

In 2009, another anime television series was announced, called Tamagotchi! (たまごっち!). It began in October 2009 and ended in March 2015. A short-lived English dub of the Tamagotchi anime aired in Australia on channel GO! from 2010 to 2014; only the first 26 episodes have been dubbed, and were repeated until 2014, when GO! took the anime out of their channel. The anime has been dubbed in Tagalog in the Philippines, with said dub airing on GMA Network. There is also a dub in Taiwan that aired on YoYo TV.

From November 23, 2013, to December 2014, Bandai America adapted the second Tamagotchi anime, Tamagotchi! Yume Kira Dream, into "webisodes" promoting the then-latest addition to the franchise outside Japan, Tamagotchi Friends.

=== Books ===
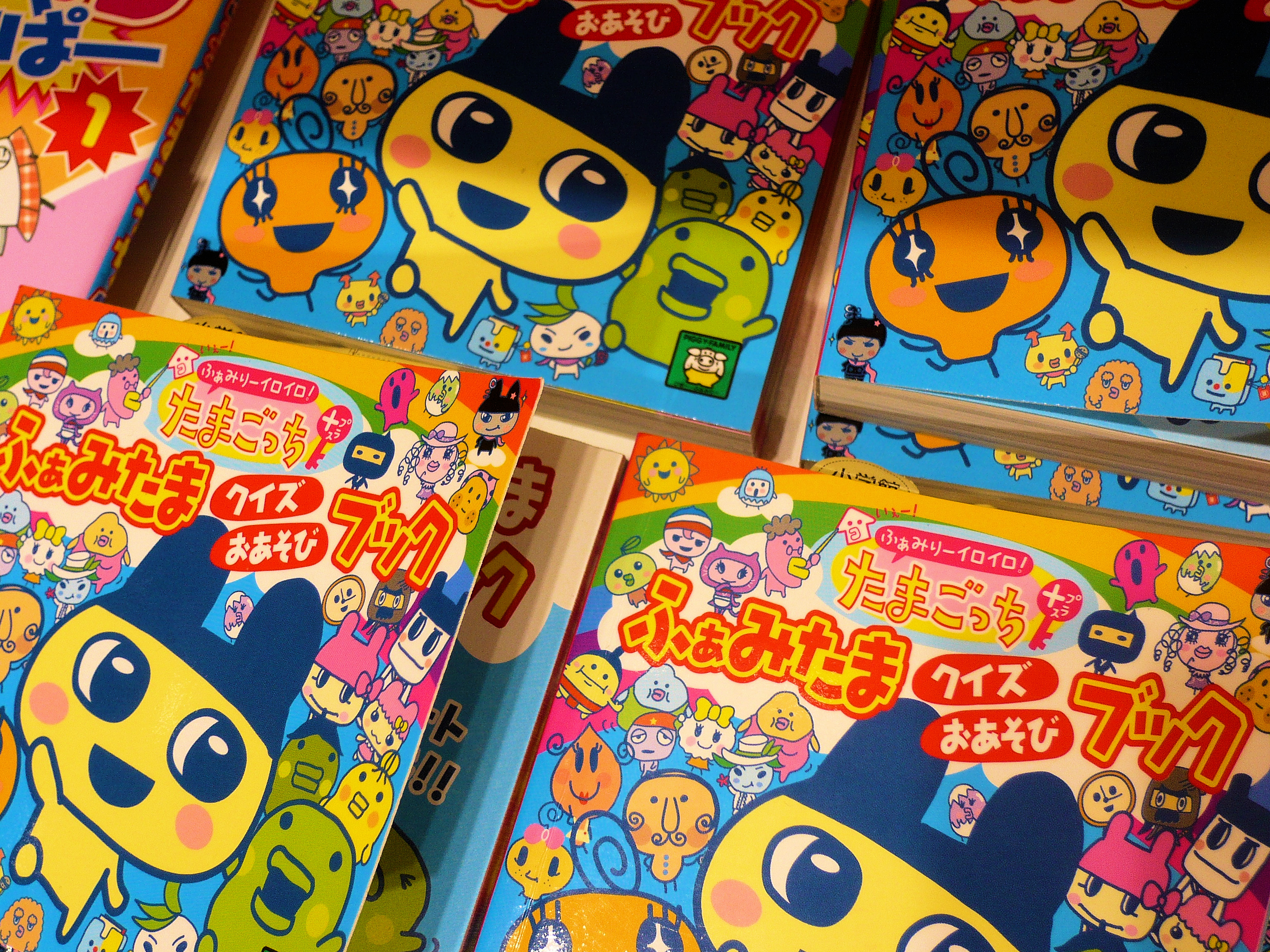
Tamagotchi books at Tama Depa shop, Tokyo Dome City

Many of the Tamagotchi collections included guidebooks, including but not limited to:

- Tamagotchi Paradise Perfect Guide (in Japanese). Japan: Shogakukan. July 12, 2025. ISBN 978-4-09-227439-6.
- Tamagotchi Research Report: Tamagotchi Book (in Japanese). Japan: Tokuma Shoten Co., Ltd. August 1997. ISBN 978-4-19-720023-8.
- The Official Tamagotchi Pet Care Guide and Record Book. Virgin Books. 1997. ISBN 978-0-7535-0210-5.
- Tamagotchi Angel Guidebook
- Tamagotchi Uni Guidebook
- Tamagotchi P1 Keychain User Guide. Bandai. 1996.
- Tamagotchi: Osutchi & Mesutchi Guidebook
- Glitter Tamagotchi P's Training Book, including a Wonder Life special
- The Tamagotchi Encyclopedia
- Learn everything about Tamagotchi with this book (たまごっちのことが全部わかる本 )
- For the 20th anniversary, Tamagotchi released the Tamagotchi Corner Shop 20th Anniversary Official Fanbook during June 2025 in Japan

== Reception and impact ==
When we were stuck on talk of the spectacular 3D graphics of Mario 64 and racing games, we saw a huge hit in the form of Tamagotchi — a tiny key chain boasting pictures made up of no more than 10 or 20 dots. At that time, I thought that Mario 64 had lost to Tamagochi [sic]. [laughs. Miyamoto quickly adds in English: "I'm serious."]

— Shigeru Miyamoto

The Tamagotchi was extremely popular globally in 1997-1998 having been referred to as becoming a "pop culture phenomenon". The success of the Tamagotchi led to the electronic pet being appointed the Christmas Gift of the Year by the Swedish Retail Institute in November 1997. The toy was especially popular among the high school girls and young women demographics. It also spawned the virtual pet genre and led to many knock-off products or imitators at the time, such as Tiger/Hasbro's Giga Pet.

During the peak of the original toy's fad, children frequently took Tamagotchi digital pets to school because in the first two releases (Generation 1 and Generation 2), a character could die in less than half a day if it did not receive adequate care. Teachers expressed concerns over class disruption as well as general distraction from schoolwork and this eventually led many schools to ban the product. Children became emotional over the deaths of their Tamagotchi, leading to teenagers sending them to graveyards for burial and urban legends of teen suicide, such as an alleged case of a teenage girl hanging herself over the death of her Tamagotchi after her parents took it away as a punishment.

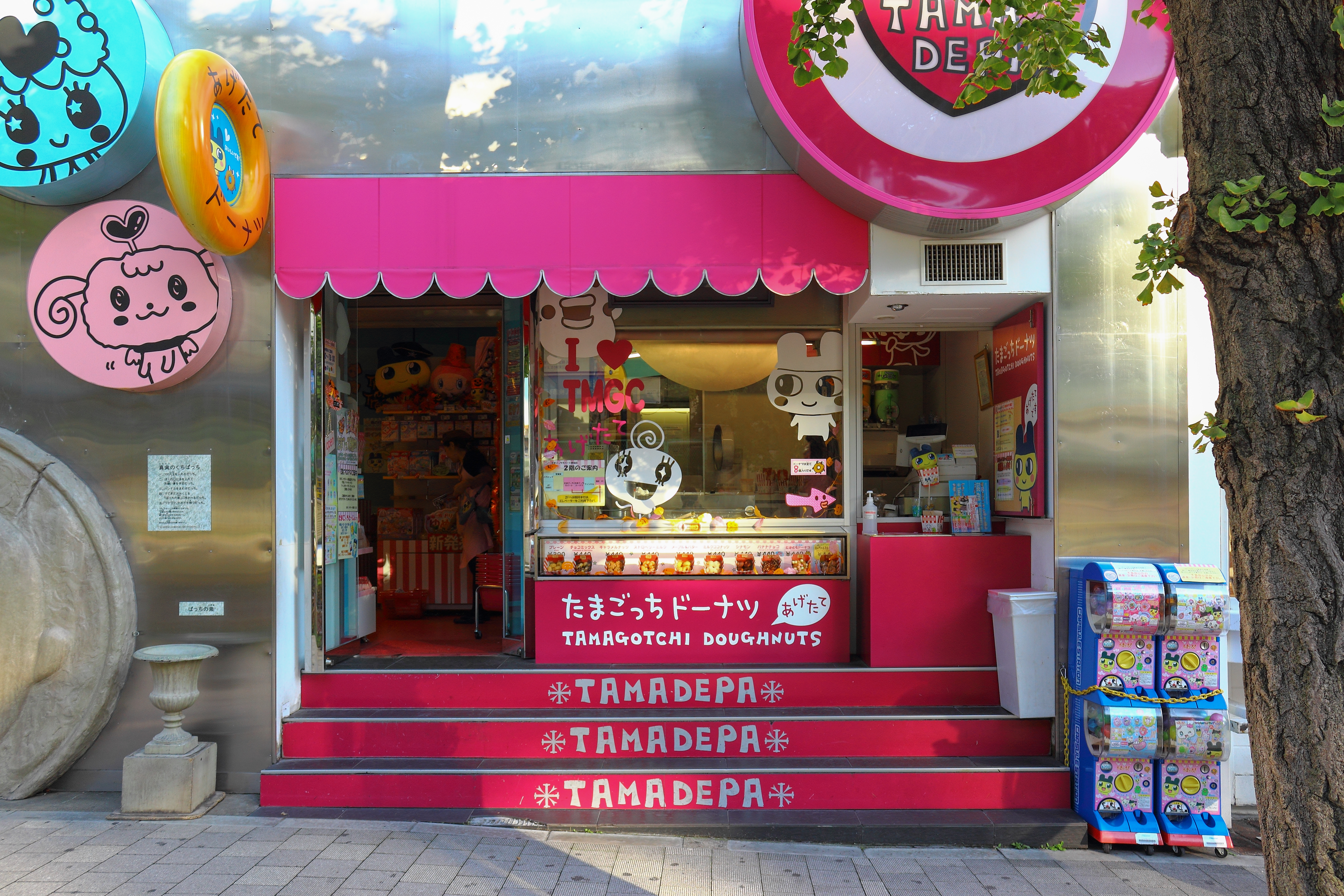
The Tamagotchi Official Shop in Harajuku, Tokyo

The Tamagotchi became popular again in the mid-2000s after the release of Tamagotchi Connection, especially among teens and tweens. New online communities also popped up for fans and enthusiasts of Tamagotchi, such as the TamaTalk forum that launched in 2004 and the long-running fan-made blog Tama-Palace. In Tokyo, Bandai opened a Tamagotchi Department Store in 2007. While Tamagotchi continued to be relevant in Japan during the early 2010s, the product was no longer being pushed by Bandai overseas.

The toy had a second revival in the early 2020s after the global release of the Tamagotchi ON, Tamagotchi Pix and several pop culture crossover Tamagotchi Nano models. Between 2022 and 2023, global sales doubled. The reason for this seems to be for nostalgia and is driven by both millennials and a new audience of young people who were not around during the toy's original run of the late 90s. This led to the openings of official retail Tamagotchi Shops as part of Bandai Namco Cross Stores. The first pop-up store in Tokyo became permanent in March 2024. The Tamagotchi Shop also opened in London and Madrid with further expansion to America and other places.

In 2025, The Strong National Museum of Play inducted Tamagotchi into its World Video Game Hall of Fame. Kristy Hisert of The Strong Museum said Tamagotchi "provided players with feelings of connection, caring, and customization, a respite from competition and fighting games. The legacy of Tamagotchi can be seen in the popular pet simulation games that followed[...] throughout the subsequent years."

=== Sales numbers ===
Bandai sold 400,000 units in 1996, increasing to 10 million by July 1997 and 13 million by October 1997. By Spring 1998, nearly 40 million units were sold worldwide, including 20 million in Japan and nearly 20 million overseas. In the first two years following Tamagotchi's release, Bandai had sold 40 million units.

As of December 2005, over 15 million units of the Tamagotchi Connection/Plus had been sold. This number rose to 20 million by 2006.

By 2010, after the release of newer Tamagotchi models, over 76 million Tamagotchis had been sold worldwide. By 2017, over 82 million units had been sold worldwide. By March 2021, Bandai Namco had sold 83.73 million Tamagotchi units. By June 2023, over 91 million units were sold worldwide. As of 2025, 98.1 million units have been sold worldwide.

== See also ==
- Digimon – Digital pet
- Furby – Electronic robotic toy
- Fin Fin on Teo the Magic Planet – 1996 video game
- Giga Pet – Digital pet toys
- Neopets – Virtual pet site
- Pixel Chix – Handheld electronic game
- Pokémon Pikachu – Series of digital pet devices
- Pou – 2012 virtual pet game
- Sea-Monkeys – Brine shrimp sold as pets
- Sumikko Gurashi – San-X characters
- Tamagotchi effect – Development of emotional attachment to machines, robots or software agents
- Tuttuki Bako
