= Tamagotchi Town =

2006 Browser game

- Developer: Bandai
- Type: Toys-to-life game
- Launched: 2006
- Discontinued: 2013
- Platform: Online (Macromedia Flash)
- Status: Shutdown

Tamagotchi Town (aka TamaTown) was a browser game that interacted with versions 3, 4 (JinSei), 4.5 (JinSei Plus), 5 (Familitchi), 5.5 (Familitchi Celebrity), 6 (Music Star) and the new Tama-Go Tamagotchis. It allowed owners to obtain points and items online that could be used on the Tamagotchi. It transferred data between the game and machine using a 10-14 digit hexadecimal code typed when logging in and out (excluding Version 3).

== V3 Tamagotchi Town ==
The original Tama Town was created for the Version 3 Tamagotchi. When an item is received, a 10-digit password appears, and one enters it into the Tamagotchi. The Tamagotchi online worlds have been expanded to most all versions (except v1 and v2), the music star is the most popular virtual world called 'Music City', players were able to register their character from your 'Music Star Tamagotchi' and play games and talk. The ability to login as ones 'Tama-Go' characters was also available.

The V3 Tamagotchi Town featured the town hall, theatre, mall, school, grandparents', and parents' house, arcade, travel agency, food court, and the King's palace.

On February 6, 2013, the servers for Tamagotchi Town shut down.
