= Tamagotchi Connection =

Tamagotchi series first released in 2004

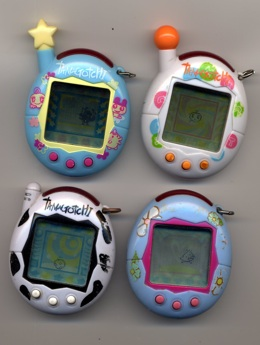
Four Tamagotchi Connection toys

The Tamagotchi Connection, marketed as Tamagotchi Connexion outside the Americas and as Tamagotchi Plus in Japan, is a virtual pet in the Tamagotchi line of digital toys from Bandai. First released in 2004, 8 years after the first Tamagotchi toy, they were notable for their wireless networking feature: using the device's infrared port, the virtual pet can make friends with other Tamagotchis, in addition to playing games, giving and receiving presents and having a baby. In May 2024, Bandai announced a relaunch of the Tamagotchi Connection to celebrate the series' 20th anniversary. They were officially released in July 2024.

Versions 1 to 4 of Tamagotchi Connection have 6 levels of friendship that can be viewed in the Friends List:

- Acquaintance (one smiley-face)
- Buddy (two smiley-faces)
- Friend (three smiley-faces)
- Good friend (four smiley-faces)
- Best friend (two love-hearts, two smiley-faces, during connection they may kiss)
- Partner (four love-hearts, during connection they will kiss and may have babies)

Versions 5 and 6 have different levels.

If the Tamagotchi cannot find a partner from another device to have babies with, a matchmaker will come, allowing the Tamagotchi to have a baby with a computer-controlled Tamagotchi character. This applies to versions 1 to 4 and 6 only. Version 5 introduces a Dating Show game in which the user must play to gain a CPU partner.

== Versions ==
All Tamagotchi Connection devices are capable of connecting with each other; however, a character from a newer Version will show on an older version as the mystery character known as Nazotchi.

=== Tamagotchi Connection v2 (2005) ===
The Tamagotchi Connection v2 introduces "Gotchi Points", an in-game currency used to buy shop items. Also, more games are unlocked as the Tamagotchi ages. It has six stages of life:

- Egg - This only occurs once the device has been reset, either by pressing the reset button on the rear of the device or by installing a new battery. Once the clock has been set, it will hatch in one minute.
- Baby - The baby unlocks the game Jump.
- Child - The child unlocks the game Bump.
- Teenager - The teenager unlocks the games Flag and Heading.
- Adult - The adult unlocks the game Slot.
- Senior. The senior can only be unlocked if the Tamagotchi stays unmarried for a certain number of days. This applies to all versions.

=== Tamagotchi Connection v3 (2006) ===
Aside from different games, The Tamagotchi Connection v3 makes few changes in comparison to the v2. Like the v2, the older the Tamagotchi gets, the more games it has access to; further, there are still six stages of life.

- Egg - Like the v2, the egg is the first stage and occurs when the device has been reset. When the clock has been set, the egg will hatch in one minute.
- Baby - The baby unlocks the game Get Music.
- Child. The child unlocks the game Bump.
- Teenager. The teenager unlocks the games Flag and Heading.
- Adult. The adult unlocks the games Memory and Sprint.
- Senior. Like on the v2, the Senior can only be unlocked if the Tamagotchi stays unmarried for a certain number of days.

Other differences from the v2 include:

- There is no 'Treat' option in the food.
- There are new 'Password' and 'Souvenir' options.
- When you are connecting with another v3, visiting is a new option.
- There are new 'Point' and 'Family' options in the friendbook.

=== Tamagotchi Connection v4 Jinsei (2007) ===
As in previous versions, Tamagotchis play games for a certain number of "Gotchi Points" and unlock more games as it ages.

- Egg - This only occurs when the device has been reset. Once the clock has been set, it will hatch in one minute.
- Baby - The baby unlocks the game Jumping Rope.
- Child - The child unlocks the game Mimic.
- Teenager - The teenager unlocks the games Shape, Dance and Flag.
- Adult - As an adult, the Tamagotchi can get a job which unlocks various mini-games, depending on what job the player chooses for the Tamagotchi.
- Senior - Much like previous versions, the Senior life stage can only be achieved if the Tamagotchi stays unmarried for a certain number of days.

The Tamagotchi Connection makes additional changes to gameplay instead of simply changing the games and other minor details. For example, the child and teenager can go to school and play mini-games, where an adult can get a job. Also, the "Lamp" menu item (allows the user to turn the "light" on or off) is no longer present. Instead, it is replaced with a "Mail" menu item where the player can check for any mail they will occasionally receive.

New to the Tamagotchi Connection with the v4 is the ability for a child or teenager Tamagotchi to go to school and an adult to go to work. The player can choose which teacher they want once the Tamagotchi reaches the Teenage stage, and will train either "Intelligence Points", "Style Points" and "Kindness Points" through mini-games. The player also chooses what job an adult Tamagotchi gets and will unlock mini-games based on this choice. It also introduces characters being separated by groups (Mame, Meme, Kuchi and Universal) and genders.

==== Tamagotchi Connection v4.5 ====
The Connection v4.5 makes minimal changes to gameplay from the v4, short of adding new games; however, the way to obtain the Universal family is different.

- Egg - This only occurs when the device has been reset. Once the clock has been set, it will hatch in one minute.
- Baby - The baby unlocks the game Climb.
- Child - The child unlocks the game Tug of War.
- Teenager - The teenager unlocks the games Apples, Shapes, and Man-hole.
- Adult - As an adult, the Tamagotchi can get a job which unlocks various mini-games, depending on what job the player chooses for the Tamagotchi.
- Senior - Much like previous versions, the Senior life stage can only be achieved if the Tamagotchi stays unmarried for a certain number of days.

==== PC ====
This option is needed to visit the V4 online world of Tamagotchi Town. The Tamagotchi goes off the screen and a Log-In Password is provided. At Tamagotchi Town, the password is entered and Tamagotchi Town appears on-screen. In Tamagotchi Town, many things can be done. Activities include:

- Shopping for items and food (up to 10)
- Earning "Gotchi" points (up to 9900)
- Earning souvenirs
- Travelling to different countries
- Going to preschool
- Going to school
- Going to work
- Playing games
- Visit previous Tamagotchis

=== Tamagotchi Connection v5 Familitchi (2008) ===
The Tamagotchi Connection v5 is the English version of the FamiTama and is the first Tamagotchi to be exactly the same (besides language) worldwide since the Tamagotchi Plus. It was released in Asia on January 6, 2008, in Australia on January 10, 2008, and was released worldwide later in February 2008. The v5 introduces the ability to raise families, with 3-5 parents and kids. It also has a new website that it shares with the Famitama, the "Tama and Earth Expo". According to the package, "The Tamagotchis set up this expo to learn more about Earth." It contains a central pavilion and 4 other pavilions representing each of the main areas of the Earth. It also included a TV option where the player can use Gotchi Points to shop on the Shopping Channel, find a mate with the Dating Show, or go traveling on the Traveling Show which replaces the pause function of previous generations. There is a design flaw with the v5 which prevents it from properly connecting to the other Tamagotchis in the series.

Differences from previous versions:

- Individual Tamagotchis cannot be named. Instead, a family name is selected and individuals are identified by their character type.
- There is a family bond percentage
- The Discipline is replaced with a Play option.
- The Medicine chest is expanded to contain general items as well.

==== Life stages and games ====
- Egg
- Baby
- Child
- Teenager
- Adult
- Parent (replacing the Senior life stage of previous generations)

When raising a family without parents, only the TV Surfing and Tea Time games are available. Having parents unlocks the Golf Putt and Shoe Pairs games. The Tamagotchi Connection v5 also has a v5.5 variant, which brings minimal changes to the generation.

=== Tamagotchi Connection v6 Music Star ===
The Tamagotchi Connection v6 is the final release in the Connection series and allows the Tamagotchi to become a pop star. As the Tamagotchi ages, it will learn a musical instrument and a band manager will come once the Tamagotchi reaches 5 in-game years of age. Every Tamagotchi Connection v6 includes a guitar pick with a code for Tamatown on it.

==== Life Stages and Games ====
- Egg
- Baby
- Child
- Teenager
- Adult
- Senior

The Tamagotchi can play all three music games, Sing A Song, Music Notes and Sound Block from birth. The Tamagotchi has a band from the teenager stage, whose members cannot be named, but the band itself can.

==== Friendship ====
The Adoptive Connection Glitter Pad has 6 levels of friendship which is depends on the level, they will fall in love or not. Below is the list of Friendship Levels.

- Assistant (one smiley face, during connection, they are unlikely to kiss together.)
- Buddy (two smiley faces, during connection, they may kiss.)
- Patron (three smiley faces, during connection, they are equally likely to kiss together.)
- Friend (four smiley faces, during connection, they are equally likely to kiss together and unlikely to have a baby.)
- Good Friend (two love hearts, during connection they may kiss and equally likely to have a baby.)
- Best Friend (four love hearts, during connection they will kiss and likely to have babies.)

=== 2024 Re-release ===
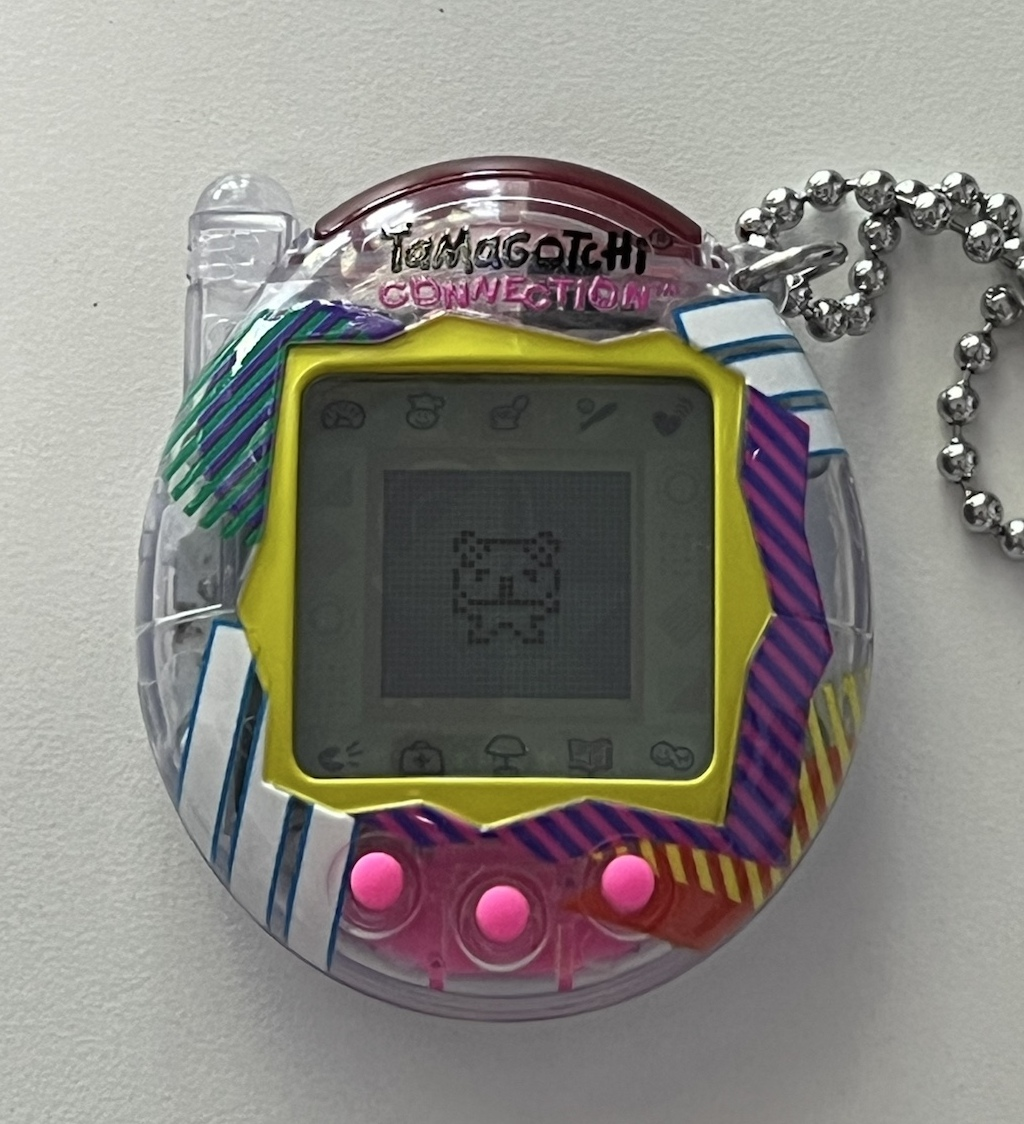
Tamagotchi Connection (2024 re-release) toy, featuring an adult-stage Tamagotchi, Furawatchi.

In 2024, Bandai re-released the Tamagotchi Connection toy for the 20th anniversary of the line.
