= PaRappa =

Video game character

PaRappa Rappa
- PaRappa the Rapper character
- PaRappa, as seen in PaRappa the Rapper
- First appearance: PaRappa the Rapper (1996)
- Created by: Masaya Matsuura; Rodney Greenblat
- Voiced by: Dred Foxx (video games); Miyu Irino (anime)

In-universe information
- Alias: PaRappa the Rapper
- Species: Dog
- Gender: Male

PaRappa Rappa is a fictional character created by Japanese musician Masaya Matsuura and American artist Rodney Greenblat. PaRappa first appears as the title character of the 1996 rhythm video game PaRappa the Rapper, developed by NanaOn-Sha for Sony Interactive Entertainment's PlayStation console.

Within the series, PaRappa is depicted as a paper-thin two-dimensional anthropomorphic dog with wholesome personality traits and is enthusiastic about rap music. Matsuura came up with the character's musical style and cut-out visual concept, whereas Greenblat is responsible for the character's final appearance and art style, which is similar to his prior children's books and CD-ROM projects.

After 1996's PaRappa the Rapper met with significant commercial success and critical acclaim, PaRappa was for a time considered to be a mascot for the fledging PlayStation brand in its native Japan. PaRappa's popularity spawned a media franchise that included the 1999 spin-off title Um Jammer Lammy, the 2001 sequel PaRappa the Rapper 2, and a number of media adaptations outside of video games. The character is generally well received by critics in retrospective assessments and is often cited as one of the most memorable video game characters associated with the PlayStation brand.

== Development ==
PaRappa is presented as a square-headed dog with oversized eyes and black floppy ears sticking out from under an orange beanie. He wears a blue sleeveless shirt, dark blue baggy pants, and red sneakers. PaRappa's co-creators are Masaya Matsuura, a musician and video game designer who founded the Japanese video game company NanaOn-Sha, and Rodney Greenblat, a graphic artist and illustrator who worked in children's books prior to his involvement in the video game industry. The name PaRappa originated as a word play meaning flat or paper thin in Japanese, which references the character's physical nature. PaRappa is voiced by hip hop artist Dred Foxx in all video game appearances, including the 2012 crossover fighting game PlayStation All-Stars Battle Royale. In the Japan-exclusive anime, Miyu Irino was PaRappa's voice actor.

In an interview with Game Developer, Greenblat described Matsuura as PaRappa's "father", and himself as the character's "mother". During the early-to-mid 1990s, Greenblat was given numerous creative work opportunities by Sony Interactive Entertainment after he gained some recognition for his flair in creating cute characters that appeal to Japanese consumers. On one occasion, a Sony employee who was connected to the company's licensing group invited Greenblat to meet Matsuura's team, who were developing an experimental video game for the then-upcoming PlayStation console. At the time, Matsuura was aware of Greenblat's work from his past children's books and CD-ROM projects, and was already using placeholder characters from Greenblat's 1993 CD-ROM game Dazzeloids for the project. Greenblat noted that the team already knew they wanted to make a rap music game, and they were looking for someone to handle its artistic side. Matsuura invited Greenblat to work on the project, a call and response game where different musical samples could be plugged in and played to a rhythm like a DJ box, and its characters would be animated to the rhythm.

Greenblat was commissioned by Sony to use some of his existing characters and to create a new protagonist. He described the process of character design to be collaborative by nature: he worked with both Matsuura and Gabin Ito, the project's writer, and would create sketches freely based on their suggestions or ideas for a specific character's personality. According to Greenblat, it takes a short time for him to produce character sketches by himself, but a lot more time for an entire team to decide by consensus. He recalled that character designs were sometimes accepted relatively quickly, while others may involve many attempts and revisions before it is finalized. For example, he only needed a fortnight to finalize PaRappa's design, whereas the lead character of the 1999 spin-off title Um Jammer Lammy took approximately half a year by comparison. In terms of characterization, the team wanted to pursue the concept of a player character who would consult with several mentors or instructors who would teach him how to do a rap; the teacher would say one thing, and the player character would repeat it. Greenblat was asked by Matsuura to design several variations of characters that can rap for the game's lead character, with Matsuura initially proposing an anthropomorphic shrimp as the lead character. Greenblat recalled that the team wanted a character who was "trustworthy, loyal, hardworking, romantic and a little insecure". He believed that a dog embody all of these requested traits, and decided to make several sketches of canine-themed rapper characters, and worked with the team to pick out the best design among the character's iterations.

I had to create a whole new PaRappa world and check things; I would get rushes for each episodes and make corrections, and they wouldn't even do anything about it! Characters kept on changing and messing up... in the game PaRappa could drive a car so you figure he's 16 or 17, but in the show he's sitting in the third grade and his antics were based on what 8 or 9 year old are doing? It just got all nutty... and then I think [all the various parties] all fell apart.

— Rodney Greenblat, "Interview: Rodney Greenblat, The Mother Of Sony's Almost Mario".

Greenblat noted that prior to the release of PaRappa the Rapper, Sony did not yet have a strong mascot that would serve as the "face" of the company and for the PlayStation console. He believed that PaRappa's music, energy and cool factor made him "the perfect face" and that the character had the potential to be Sony's long term answer to Nintendo's Mario. With regard to PaRappa's short-lived prominence in the video game industry, Greenblat attributed the character's gradual loss of popularity to a series of decisions made by company executives which did not capitalize on the character's potential. He was frustrated with the creative direction of PaRappa the Rapper anime television series in particular: he was asked to work as the show's character designer, but was not allowed to write or be part of the show's production. Greenblat believed that the show undermined the character's appeal with the video game series' core audience, which were predominantly teenagers, as Sony wanted to pursue a marketing strategy that prioritized merchandising opportunities for young children. Greenblat noted that the show never caught on with its target audience, and that when it was cancelled by January 2002, all the involved companies decided to move on from the character and associated intellectual property altogether.

Matsuura told Engadget during a pre-Tokyo Game Show meeting in 2011 that the "possibility of remaking or rebuilding or making sequels" starring PaRappa has always been a topic of discussion. He believed that a handheld platform like the upcoming PlayStation Vita represented an incentive to revisit a video game featuring PaRappa with regard to both content and business issues. Matsuura explained that to only do handheld platforms could provide a better experience with regard to risk of latency compared to home consoles, but also a new business model could be attempted with regard to developing a new rhythm game starring PaRappa. Greenblat expressed a hope that Sony would realize PaRappa's "golden true potential" in the rhythm game genre, and that he would given further opportunities to design some new games. In 2013, Foxx led a social media campaign to persuade Sony into commissioning a new game in the rhythm action series.

== Appearances ==
=== Video games ===
The plot of 1996's PaRappa the Rapper follows PaRappa's attempts to impress his love interest, an anthropomorphic sunflower named Sunny Funny. Each of the game's stages opens with a cutscene establishing a humorous and upbeat scenario that PaRappa needs to resolve, such as learning karate from Chop Chop Master Onion in order to defend Sunny from local bullies, or learning how to drive so he could take Sunny on a trip to the beach. During each sequence, the players must tap a complex sequence of buttons to rhythmically synchronize with the on-screen directions, while watching and listening to PaRappa's raps about his experiences and the repetition of his catchphrase, "I know...I gotta believe!"

A bonus mode was included in the 1999 spin-off title Um Jammer Lammy, which the entire game (excluding Stage 1) could be replayed with PaRappa as the protagonist, complete with his own versions of the game's stages.

PaRappa is the lead character of PaRappa the Rapper 2, which was released for the PlayStation 2 in 2001 in Japan and 2002 in North America and Europe. The sequel's plot revolve around noodles as a plot device, and features the fathers of both PaRappa and Sunny in an expanded role.

PaRappa appears as a playable character in PlayStation All-Stars Battle Royale, released for PlayStation 3 and PlayStation Vita in November 2012. His quick and agile play style revolves around using his karate taught to him by Chop Chop Master Onion as well as moves inspired by his love of music and skateboarding.

PaRappa makes a cameo appearance in the PlayStation 5 launch title, 2020's Astro's Playroom, a celebration of the PlayStation brand.

=== In other media ===
In 2000, Greenblat released a standalone collection of comics called RodneyFun Comic Collection 1, which features PaRappa and several supporting characters dealing with relatable albeit eccentrically portrayed life problems. One of the storylines involve PaRappa trying to get a job to afford a new game.

PaRappa is the lead character of an eponymous 30-episode anime television series, produced by J.C. Staff and Production I.G. Directed by Hiroaki Sakurai, it aired in Japan between 14 April 2001 and 14 January 2002. The show was intended as a tie-in with the release of 2001's PaRappa the Rapper 2 and to increase merchandise sales, and marked the first instance that PaRappa was voiced in Japanese. The TV series marked the first appearance of PaRappa's sister Pinto and her pet Uee.

PaRappa appears as a supporting character in an anime series by Doga Kobo, titled PJ Berri no Mogu Mogu Munya Munya (PJベリーのもぐもぐむにゃむにゃ, PJ Berri's Munching Mumbling), which began airing in October 2016 as part of the #Hi Paul variety show, following a pilot episode which aired on 18 August 2016. It consists of a series of short segments featuring supporting character PJ Berri as its lead, which aired as part of Fuji TV's Hi Poul programming block. It was announced to celebrate the 20th anniversary of the original PaRappa the Rapper as well as the anime's 15th anniversary.

== Cultural impact ==
=== Promotion and merchandise ===
An arrangement album styled after PaRappa and PJ Berri titled PJ & Parappa – I Scream! was released to promote Um Jammer Lammy, which remixes many of the game's songs from stages and cutscenes to include full-length rap routines performed by Dred Foxx as PaRappa. Some of its tracks were performed by the game's composers and performers for the launch party of Um Jammer Lammy at New York's The Roxy nightclub.

Sony published an interview with Rodney Greenblat on its website to promote the release of the PlayStation Portable (PSP) port of the original PaRappa the Rapper. It featured select questions provided by eu.playstation.com forum members, who were each promised a PaRappa plushie based on Greenblat's design as a reward. Sony also announced several PaRappa promotions throughout the summer of 2007 to promote the release of the first game's PSP port, including a limited edition t-shirt featuring PaRappa by Paul Frank Industries.

In a video uploaded to the Official PlayStation Europe YouTube channel which coincided with the launch of PaRappa the Rapper Remastered for PlayStation 4 in April 2017, several interviewees discuss PaRappa's cultural significance.

In 2021, Japanese skateboard brand WIND AND SEA launched a PaRappa the Rapper "capsule", a collection of clothing items like t-shirts, long sleeves, bucket hats, beanies, cushions, slippers, and keychains which feature the iconography of PaRappa as well as other series characters.

=== Reception ===
PaRappa has been featured in a number of "top" character lists by critics. In 2008 MTV named PaRappa the greatest video game canine character. GamesRadar staff ranked PaRappa number 87 in a 2012 list of the best heroes or protagonists in games. IGN ranked PaRappa 8th place in their 2019 list of the "Top 10 Dogs in Video Games".

Critics noted that PaRappa was created at the very moment in which Japanese hip-hop transitioned from a small subculture to a mainstream phenomenon. Noting the character's enthusiasm in spite of his goofy nature, J. C. Herz described PaRappa in an article for The New York Times in 1998 as the "Will Smith of video game characters". He observed that the character "manages to be hip by not being cool, a contrast to the sneering action heroes who have become parodies of themselves". In the 2017 publication 100 Greatest Video Game Characters, Ted Dickinson and Robert Mejia said PaRappa's design offers insight into the transnational uptake and circulation of both African American and Japanese cultures. Within the context of Japanese culture in the mid-1990s, PaRappa's exaggerated facial features and youthful appearance situate him as a product of its kawaii culture, the devotion to an aesthetic which "idolizes the presocial" as a form of escapism from the structures of society that affects the likelihood of one's success. PaRappa's kawaii presentation is also grounded in his unbridled optimism, and in his childlike interspecies love for Sunny Funny which is characterized as adorable and depoliticized. Dickinson and Mejia observed that PaRappa and his music is disconnected from the "historically oppositional politics" of African American music and is firmly on the side of the "party rap" scenes favored by Japanese record labels in the mid-1990s, which appropriates the hi-hop genre's commercial iconography. Nevertheless, they concluded that the transnational circulation of hip-hop has created a space of productive difference for Japanese youth, allowing them to think through the challenges unique to their various circumstances, and that in this instance PaRappa's character and music is a "good faith form of appropriation" which still offers significant cultural meaning to Japanese consumers of that time period.

PaRappa's appearance in PlayStation All-Stars Battle Royale was met with a mixed response. Greenblat was not impressed to see the character portrayed in a weapon-filled battle game, although he was pleased that PaRappa appeared to be making a comeback with further video game appearances and he did consider Battle Royale to be a fun game. Ishaan Sahdev from Siliconera assessed PaRappa's play style as "brutal" and accessible in a similar fashion as Kratos from God of War, but is offset by his very limited range. Greg Miller from IGN had a good impression of playing with PaRappa, praising his "rad 2D-like" art style where he folds like a piece of paper to move as well as his arsenal of general uses, but felt he is held back by his "Level 3 Super" move. On the other hand, Jeff Marchiafava from Game Informer considered PaRappa to be among the game's worst characters and mocked him as being inept and out of place. Jim McGrath from Hardcore Gaming 101 praised the reprisal of Dred Foxx as PaRappa and the character's overall presentation, but felt that the shading of his colors to fit in with the rest of the game ends up with a "gauche" look. He also criticized both his moveset and his campaign to be underwhelming.

=== In popular culture ===
A PaRappa cosplayer at Furry Weekend Atlanta 2026, a furry convention

Like Crash Bandicoot, whose debut game was released on the same day, PaRappa went on to become an iconic mascot character for the PlayStation brand due to the international commercial success of the first PaRappa the Rapper game. PaRappa has been referenced in popular culture, and as the subject of fan labor activities such as cosplay. A cast member of the webseries Mega64 appears as PaRappa in a 2008 episode. PaRappa appeared in three sketches in the Adult Swim television show Robot Chicken. In one of the segments of the show, PaRappa is picked over his competitor in a freestyle battle by 50 Cent, who appears as himself, and is signed to his G-Unit label.
