= PaRappa the Rapper (TV series) =

2001 Anime

- Logo

パラッパラッパー (Parappa Rappā)
- Created by: Masaya Matsuura; Rodney Alan Greenblat
- Anime television series
- Directed by: Hiroaki Sakurai
- Produced by: Sōsuke Osabe; Hideo Katsumata
- Written by: Yoshio Urasawa
- Music by: Masaya Matsuura; Yoshihisa Suzuki; Yasushi Kurobane
- Studio: J.C.Staff
- Original network: FNS (Fuji TV)
- Original run: April 14, 2001 – January 11, 2002
- Episodes: 30

PaRappa the Rapper (パラッパラッパー, PaRappa Rappā) is a 2001 Japanese anime television series based on and a prequel to NanaOn-Sha's PaRappa the Rapper video game series created by Masaya Matsuura and Rodney Alan Greenblat. The series was produced by Fuji Television and SME Visual Works, animated by J.C.Staff and aired in Japan on Fuji Television and its affiliates between April 2001 and January 2002, running for thirty episodes. Episodes 29 and 30 aired together as a 1-hour special.

== Summary ==
The series focuses on PaRappa, a cute and happy dog who enjoys music, dancing and spending time with his friends PJ Berri, Katy Kat, and his love interest, Sunny Funny. The show includes various characters who make returning appearances from the video games. It also introduces several new characters who are exclusive to the TV series, such as Matt Major, an athletic, popular dog, Paula Fox, Katy's rival, but Sunny's friend, Pinto, PaRappa's little sister, and Gaster and Groober, a villainous duo who cause all sorts of mischief.

== Production ==
During the production of PaRappa the Rapper 2, Sony wanted to develop a PaRappa anime aimed at children in order to boost merchandise sales. The series was a joint production effort between Fuji TV, SME Visual Works, and J.C.Staff. Rodney Greenblat, the art director for the PaRappa games, was asked to design new characters who would appear in the anime. He was against the idea of the show being aimed towards children and instead wanted it to be aimed towards teenagers, but this did not end up happening. He was not allowed to work on the anime at all aside from the character design, as the anime team did not want anyone pulled away from the production of the second game. In an interview with Gamasutra, Greenblat voiced his frustration about the production of the anime.

"I wasn't into that, because I was like "Everyone knew teenagers loved PaRappa, so let's do a teen show". But [Sony] wanted to sell toys, so [the show's producers] made a little kids version of PaRappa. Then they wanted me to design other characters for the show. And I was "okay, but let me write some of the episodes that these new characters will be in" and they didn't let me do that. They only let me design characters, they didn't let me write or be part of the show's production, and I felt as if I was kicked, in a way, out of something I always wanted to do. I always wanted to work in animation, to see my characters on a TV show. So the TV show was not a success, it was not a good show. I don't know about the writing because it was all in Japanese, but apparently it didn't connect with the kids, they didn't like it. And the time-slot it was on turned out to be a disaster. A big deal was made, it had a prime slot for little kids, but it kept on getting preempted by baseball games. There was 2 different animation houses doing the show and each had a slightly different style and that was really bugging me; my characters looked a little different in one episode to the next".

== Music ==
The series' soundtrack was composed by series designer Masaya Matsuura, along with Yoshihisa Suzuki and Yasushi Kurobane. The series uses four pieces of theme music; two opening themes and two ending themes. For the first fifteen episodes, the opening theme is "Love Together: PaRappa the Rapper MIX" (LOVE TOGETHER〜パラッパラッパーMIX〜) by Nona Reeves while the ending theme is "School Girl" by Bennie K. For episodes sixteen onwards, the opening theme is "Attitude" by Crystal Kay while the ending theme is "Yellow Balloon" (イエローバルーン, Ierō Barūn) by Chara. The original soundtrack was released in two volumes by Sony Music Entertainment in 2001 on August 22 and December 19, respectively.

== Voice cast ==
Character	Voice
PaRappa the Rapper	Miyu Irino
PJ Berri	Masami Kikuchi
Matt Major	Kenichi Suzumura
Sunny Funny	Mika Kanai
Katy Kat	Rina Nakayama
Paula Fox	Akiko Kobayashi
Boxy Boy	Masashi Ebara
Gaster	Ryō Naitō
Groober	Akio Suyama
Pinto Rappa	Mikko
Papa PaRappa	Kunihiko Yasui
Chop Chop Master Onion	Ryu Watabe
Prince Fleaswallow	Yoshito Yasuhara
Hairdresser Octopus	Yūji Mitsuya
MC King Kong Mushi	Norio Wakamoto
Sister Corn	Masako Nozawa

== Episodes ==
No.	Title	Directed by	Written by	Original release date
1	"The Initial P"; Transliteration: "Inisharu wa Pī" (Japanese: イニシャルはP)	Takayuki Hamana	Yoshio Urasawa	April 14, 2001
Series debut. PaRappa attempts to reconcile two different promises he made with two different friends. First, he tells his buddy PJ and PJ's friend Matt that he'll play basketball with them on this particular day, but also tells Katy and Sunny that he'll go with them to Sister Cone's garage sale. Things get worse when Paula shows up and angers Katy by questioning her fashion sense. Gaster also further ruins PaRappa's day by stealing his bike and the money from the garage sale.
2	"The Theater Will Be Destroyed"; Transliteration: "Gekijō ga Kowasareru" (Japanese: 劇場がこわされる)	Hiroyuki Ishidō	Yoshio Urasawa	April 28, 2001
Dorothy, who wanted to become friends with Katy, wants to become a dancer once again; however, she feels that she cannot because she is old. Katy and her friends find out that the theater is about to be taken down, so PaRappa and his friends fix everything up for Dorothy to have one last dance on stage.
3	"Tiring Class Work..."; Transliteration: "Tsukareru Jugyō da na..." (Japanese: 疲れる授業だな…)	Itsuro Kawasaki	Akatsuki Yamatoya	May 19, 2001
Matt tries to help his teacher get over his jitters after he announces that he's getting married. Matt figures out a way to help by seeking the help of Boxy Boy. Matt, PJ, and PaRappa start to cure their teacher of his fright—but instead, he turns crazy and goes after PaRappa and his friends.
4	"Is This the Sigh of Love?"; Transliteration: "Sorette Koi no Tameiki?" (Japanese: それって恋のため息？)	Shingo Kaneko	Chinatsu Hōjō	May 26, 2001
Paula goes to a club only to find a mysterious DJ, whom she falls in love with. Soon after, she starts to dream more and more about him, and eventually learns that the DJ is PJ. At first she won't admit to liking him, but then tries to set up a date with him to see if she truly loves him.
5	"You're Almost Naked"; Transliteration: "Hotondo Hadaka da ne" (Japanese: ほとんど裸だね)	Ken Andō	Chinatsu Hōjō	June 2, 2001
PaRappa and his friends decide to go on a nice picnic together; that is, until they find a pendant which causes them to move through time, getting them into all sorts of trouble. They meet and befriend a goblin and help him find the love of the girl he loves, who looks an awful lot like Sunny.
6	"Any Dish Will Taste Good"; Transliteration: "Nansara Demo Ikeru yo ne" (Japanese: 何皿でもいけるよね)	Yoshihisa Matsumoto	Hiroshi Hashimoto	June 9, 2001
PaRappa and friends visit a sushi shop, unknowing that is really a cover-up by Gaster and Groober to steal the next door bank's money. Through some unfortunate consequences, the money ends up getting blown up. Now PaRappa and company have to do all they can to keep all the bank's customers calm whilst a new shipment on money comes in.
7	"You Sure Are Bourgeois"; Transliteration: "Burujyoa da nē" (Japanese: ブルジョアだねぇ)	Takayuki Hamana	Akatsuki Yamatoya	June 16, 2001
PaRappa and the gang try to help Chief Puddle win the heart of the girl of his dreams. But when her father forbids them from being together, she runs away, and gets trapped in a wildfire at the park. While Puddle attempts to save her, PaRappa and co. attempt to put out the fire.
8	"Don't Let Anyone Find It"; Transliteration: "Darenimo Mitsukaru na" (Japanese: 誰にも見つかるな)	Daisuke Takajima	Yoshio Urasawa	June 23, 2001
PaRappa, PJ, and Matt are secretly building a rocket ship and plan on going to outer space until Sunny finds out and tells Katy, Paula, and a hippo teacher who is determined to stop them from launching the rocket.
9	"It's Too Early to Give Up!"; Transliteration: "Akirameru no wa Hayai tte!" (Japanese: 諦めるのは早いって！)	Itsuro Kawasaki	Chinatsu Hōjō	June 30, 2001
The annual PaRappa Town dance is coming up, and PaRappa is determined to ask if Sunny will go to the Dance with him, but his attempts to ask her out don't go as planned. To make things worse, at the Dance, Gaster and Groober secretly rob everyone blind, and fail.
10	"I Smell Bananas"; Transliteration: "Banana no Nioi ga Suru" (Japanese: バナナの匂いがする)	Masami Shimoda	Yoshio Urasawa	July 7, 2001
PaRappa's favorite baseball player, Schimdt, comes to town. But before he can even ask for an autograph, Schimdt is kidnapped by Gaster and Groober. PaRappa, PJ, and Matt attempt a rescue mission.
11	"That Was Pretty Heavy"; Transliteration: "Kanari Hebī Datta ne" (Japanese: かなりヘビーだったね)	Ken Andō	Hiroshi Hashimoto	July 14, 2001
Matt buys into the "Dictionary of Great Men", inspired by the dictionary and the author, Mr. Ieday, Matt goes on an adventure with PaRappa and PJ in an attempt to fulfill his dream... however, their luck quickly turns sour thanks to Gaster and Groober's meddling.
12	"Are You Perhaps Scared?"; Transliteration: "Moshikashite Kowai no?" (Japanese: もしかして怖いの？)	Yoshihisa Matsumoto	Akatsuki Yamatoya	August 11, 2001
When a gaggle of ghosts drag Sunny to an old, spooky mansion, PaRappa and friends must face their fears and rescue her.
13	"Acho! Acho!"; Transliteration: "Acho! Acho!" (Japanese: アチョ！アチョ〜！)	Masahiko Tanaka	Yoshio Urasawa	August 25, 2001
PaRappa and friends scramble to clean up the Fruits Dojo when Chop Chop Master Onion returns to town after a long training journey. However, when he gets back, the dojo falls down, so Chop Chop forces his students to clean up the dojo and to do an impromptu karate lesson, which showed that he was around the world to learn specific techniques. After much pestering from Paula, Chop Chop shows her to do "the Kilimangyro Chop". As she runs home, her friends follow her and find out that she learned it so she could slice oranges to make marmalade.
14	"Hey, Who Will You Vote For?"; Transliteration: "Nē Dare ni Tōhyō Suru?" (Japanese: ねぇ誰に投票する？)	Takayuki Hamana	Chinatsu Hōjō	September 1, 2001
School elections are coming up, and both Paula and Matt are on the ballot. PJ unexpectedly wins the ballot even though he helped both candidates.
15	"It's My Fault..."; Transliteration: "Boku no Sei da..." (Japanese: ボクのせいだ…)	Iku Suzuki	Hiro Masaki	September 8, 2001
Gaster and Groober steal Boxy Boy in hopes of using it to their advantage. But PaRappa gets everyone in PaRappa town to chase down the duo and get Boxy Boy back.
16	"I'll Work Hard"; Transliteration: "Boku ga Kaseide Miseru" (Japanese: ボクが稼いでみせる)	Hiroyuki Ishidō	Akatsuki Yamatoya	September 22, 2001
When PaRappa accidentally wrecks a nearby shop, he needs to find a way to earn $300 to pay for the repairs. Luckily, PJ, Sunny, Katy, Paula, and Matt decide to help him out.
17	"You're the Center of Attention"; Transliteration: "Chūmoku no Mato na no yo" (Japanese: 注目の的なのよ)	Toshiyuki Kōno	Yoshio Urasawa	September 29, 2001
Katy wants to show off her new wedding dress designs, but no one aside from her friends seem to notice, until Gaster and Groober show up with a deep sea plot. When they kidnap Katy, PaRappa and the gang are led on a high-speed water chase.
18	"You Seem Droopy"; Transliteration: "Shioshio da ne" (Japanese: シオシオだね)	Masahiko Tanaka	Yoshio Urasawa	October 5, 2001
After saving a flower from a bust street, and replanting it in the park, Sunny learns of another one of Gaster's and Groober's plot. In the midst of this incident, a weird pollen is spreading across town, and every flower in town is starting to droop.
19	"Kick It Up, PJ!"; Transliteration: "Buttobashite yo Pī Jei!" (Japanese: ぶっとばしてよPJ！)	Yoshihisa Matsumoto	Hiro Masaki	October 12, 2001
While the gang tries to make the best of things when a hurricane hits PaRappa Town, PJ prepares for a DJ contest. Meanwhile, Gaster and Groober plot to trap the entire town inside Club Fun.
20	"That's Quite Spectacular!"; Transliteration: "Īne Supekutakuru!" (Japanese: いいねスペクタクル〜！)	Daisuke Takajima	Akatsuki Yamatoya	October 19, 2001
Katy, Sunny and Paula want to make Matt's birthday into a huge spectacular day, but Matt is not happy about it. Everyone in town wishes him a happy birthday, so Matt runs away and decides to hide until the day is over.
21	"Leave It to Jonathan the Policeman!"; Transliteration: "Keikan Jonasan ni omakase o!" (Japanese: 警官ジョナサンにお任せを！)	Toshiyuki Kōno	Chinatsu Hōjō	October 27, 2001
PaRappa and co. help Jonathan, a police dog, look for his Chief's missing cat Julia, whom Gaster has found and is determined to make his pet.
22	"Ah, The Dinosaur Looked This Way"; Transliteration: "A, Kyōryū ga kocchi Mita" (Japanese: あ、恐竜がこっち見た)	Hiroyuki Ishidō	Yoshio Urasawa	November 2, 2001
A Sports day is being held at the school, and one of the competitors proves to be quite intimidating. While in a close race, PaRappa gets help from his little sister's pet.
23	"Like a Surfer"; Transliteration: "Sāfā na Fuzei" (Japanese: サーファーな風情)	Masahiko Tanaka	Chinatsu Hōjō	November 9, 2001
Prince Fleaswallow says he is waiting for Catherine, so PaRappa and his friends go look for her, but it seems they have no luck doing so. Meanwhile, Fleaswallow teaches PaRappa how to surf.
24	"Now! Where are the Directors?"; Transliteration: "Nau! Kantoku-tachi dokoka?" (Japanese: ナウ！監督達どこか？)	Yoshihisa Matsumoto	Hiro Masaki	November 2, 2001
Chop Chop Master Onion thinks he's going to become a movie star, but it's another one of Gaster's evil plans, which PaRappa quickly discovers and foils. However, to keep their sensei's dream alive, PaRappa and the gang try to make a movie themselves.
25	"You're Saying You Can't Sleep?!"; Transliteration: "Nemurenai dattē?!" (Japanese: 眠れないだってぇ？！)	Jun Hashimoto	Chinatsu Hōjō	November 16, 2001
After catching a cold from Gaster, PJ can't sleep, which has an adverse effect on him. What's worse, he starts to grow larger every time he eats. After being sucked into PJ's little world (via his nose), PaRappa and co. try to expunge the Gaster Virus and save their friend.
26	"I'm Sure I'll Have Muscular Pain Tomorrow"; Transliteration: "Ashita wa Kitto Kinnikutsū" (Japanese: 明日はきっと筋肉痛)	Daisuke Takajima	Akatsuki Yamatoya	December 7, 2001
PaRappa and friends try their hands at hockey. Katy is a superb goalie and learns of their coach's wishes to win the upcoming hockey game. The day of the match arrives and it's tight, with the final result resting on Katy's shoulders.
27	"Nice Flavor Today"; Transliteration: "Kyō mo Naisu Furēbā" (Japanese: 今日もナイスフレーバー)	Masahiko Tanaka	Yoshio Urasawa	December 14, 2001
Impressed by Hairdresser Octopus's new car, PaRappa decides to try it out for himself, resulting in getting chased all the way to the clouds.
28	"I Won't Hand You My Heart!"; Transliteration: "Hāto wa Watasanai!" (Japanese: ハートは渡さない！)	Hiroyuki Ishidō	Yoshio Urasawa	December 21, 2001
PaRappa and Sunny finally have their chance to be together at a Christmas party. But when Sunny's heart becomes stolen by a jealous witch, PaRappa tries to get it back with help from his friends, Santa Claus, and (reluctantly) Gaster and Groober.
29	"PJ is a Friend"; Transliteration: "Pī Jei to wa Tomodachi nandesu" (Japanese: PJとは友達なんです)	Masahiko Tanaka	Hiro Masaki	January 11, 2002
PaRappa is worried by an ominous car following him and his friends, but it turns out to be MC King Kong Mushi wanting to hire PJ under his record company. Mushi watches PJ live and is impressed by the performance and PJ is signed up... However, things take a downward turn.
30	"Give Me the PaRappa Hat!"; Transliteration: "PaRappa Bō o Kure!" (Japanese: パラッパ帽をくれ)	Shingo Kaneko	Chinatsu Hōjō	January 11, 2002
Series finale: After caring for a couple of birds, PaRappa finds that his hat was used as their nest, and that it has four bird eggs inside it the next day. After the eggs hatch, PaRappa and the gang must find someone to care for the baby birds. In the meantime, PaRappa's hat becomes a fashion statement across town.
