= Psy-S =

Japanese band (1983–1996)

Psy・S
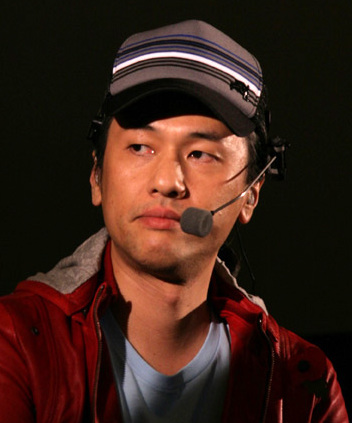
- Masaya Matsuura giving the BAFTA Vision keynote at the Gamecity festival in Nottingham, United Kingdom.

Background information
- Origin: Osaka, Japan
- Genres: Progressive pop Progressive rock New wave Synth-pop; Pop rock Electronic; J-pop
- Instruments: vocals, guitar, keyboards, bass, drums, electronics
- Years active: 1983 – 1996
- Labels: CBS/Sony (1985 - 1991); Sony Music (1991 - 1996)
- Past members: Masaya Matsuura; Chaka

Psy・S [sáiz] (Japanese: サイズ, Hepburn: Saizu) (often written as "Psy-S" or "Psy S" in English due to the lack of the Japanese dot "・" on most Western keyboards) was a Japanese progressive pop/rock band, formed in 1983 by Masaya Matsuura alongside vocalist Chaka (a pseudonym used by Mami Yasunori). After Japanese hits and successes throughout the late 1980s and early 1990s, they disbanded in 1996.

Their musical style was an experimental mixture of electronic synthesizers, highly accomplished electric guitar riffs, and haunting, piercing vocals.

They were also known in Western regions for the opening theme and the soundtrack on the OVA adaption of To-y from manga artist Atsushi Kamijo. Frontman Masaya Matsuura went on to design several music video games with his studio NanaOn-Sha, most notably, PaRappa the Rapper for the PlayStation.

== Members ==
=== Masaya Matsuura 松浦雅也 ===
(Born 16 June 1961) – from Osaka. The leader of the band, both composer and arranger. Matsuura created Psy・S' music on a Fairlight CMI synthesizer, and also able to handle keyboard, guitar and bass.

After the band's breakup, he moved into producing and designing music video games via his own company, NanaOn-Sha, and is well known in both Japan and the west for his innovative approach to music-based gameplay. He designed the well-received PlayStation titles PaRappa the Rapper (1996), UmJammer Lammy (1999) and Vib Ribbon (1999).

In 2004, Matsuura won the First Penguin Award at the Game Developers Choice Awards in San Jose. This was in recognition for his "trailblazing work with beat-rhythm and music games."

=== Chaka – Mami Yasunori 安則眞実 ===
(Born 16 July 1960) – from Osaka. Chaka was the vocalist and lyricist of the band. She began her career at age eighteen, working as a professional jazz singer in an Osaka jazz club, and joined Psy・S soon after. With Psy・S, her voice was intensely powerful and lent the band a vocal style instantly recognizable amongst the pop scene of 80s and 90s Japan.

After the band's breakup, Chaka began her solo career, reverting to her jazz roots and releasing the albums Delicious Hip (1997), I Found Love (1999), Chaka Jazz (2002), and Love (2003). In 2004, she released an album titled Believin' ~Chaka Jazz in New York, in which she collaborated with famous faces from the jazz world such as Henry "Hank" Jones. Chaka also recorded some anime songs like "Hare tokidoki Buta" (theme song, 1998); "Card Captor Sakura – Ashita e no Melody" (opening theme, 2000); "Zenmai Zamurai" (opening theme, 2006).

Today, Chaka performs live jazz gigs in her native Japan and lend her voice to many famous Japanese artists. Among them, she recently participate in chorus for the Tsuyoshi Doumoto' solo unit "Endlicheri Endlicheri" (album "Coward", single "The Rainbow Star", all along "The Rainbow Star" Tour) and in the single "Man & Woman" from Chage & Aska.

== History ==
Chaka (Mami Yasunori) met Masaya Matsuura in 1983, and two years later they released an independent album under the band name Playtechs. At this point they were merely an indies unit, and performed no live shows for the album. However, this became the basis of what would become Psy・S.

Psy・S debuted in 1985 by releasing their first Psy・S album, Different View, with Sony Music. Their first single from the album, Teenage, went on simultaneous sale. This was their major debut, and a music video was created for Teenage.

Psy・S' activity and popularity continued through the late 80s to mid 90s, where their music was used on TV shows ("Mamatte kirei!?" – 1991), anime (To-y – 1987, and City Hunter 2 – 1988), and movies (Sweet Home – 1989).

In particular, Masaya Matsuura was given full musical supervision over the sound of the acclaimed anime adaptation of Atsushi Kamijo's manga To-y (an anime set-piece developed by a "dream team" of famous Japanese names in terms of directing, character design and art direction), creating a soundtrack which has garnered much praise in anime journalism. As the Anime News Network notes, "No mention of TO-Y is complete without speaking of the music, which plays like a best-of album of Japan's progressive pop scene… For TO-Y, Psy・S' amazing opening and ending themes, Lemon no Yuuki and Cubic Lovers, are as essential to the show as the characters themselves."

During their 1985–1996 history, Psy・S released eleven original albums, one live album, three "best of" collections, seven videos and a DVD. Finally, in the June 1996 issue of Japan's PC Music magazine, Masaya Matsuura officially announced the breakup (later referred to as the "demise") of Psy・S.

In 2002, a CD collection of their best singles, Golden Best (Singles+), was released, and a live DVD (the band's first) was released in 2005 containing footage from their 1988–1989 Non-Fiction Tour, when the band were at the height of their popularity.

== Discography ==
=== Albums ===
- Different View (22 May 1985)
- Pic-Nic (2 July 1986)
- Collection (26 February 1987)
- Mint-Electric (1 August 1987)
- Non-Fiction (1 August 1988)
- Atlas (21 July 1989)
- Signal (1 July 1990)
- Two Hearts (25 April 1991)
- Holiday (12 December 1991)
- Two Spirits (22 July 1992)
- Window (1 July 1993)
- Home Made (21 April 1994)
- Emotional Engine (12 December 1994)
- Two Bridges (1 August 1996)
- Golden Best(Singles+) (20 November 2002)
- Psyclopedia (12 December 2012)

=== Singles ===
- Teenage (22 May 1985)
- Brand-New Menu (21 November 1985)
- Another Diary (5 March 1986)
- Woman・S (21 November 1986)
- Silent Song (サイレント・ソング) (26 February 1987)
- Lemon no Yuuki (Lemonの勇気) (21 October 1987)
- Angel Night (Angel Night~天使のいる場所~) (21 April 1988)
- Bara to Non Fiction (薔薇とノンフィクション) (21 July 1988)
- Parachute Limit (21 October 1988)
- Child (21 January 1989)
- Fuzzy Pain (ファジィな痛み) (21 July 1989)
- Wondering up and down~Mizu no Marginal (Wondering up and down~水のマージナル~) (1 December 1989)
- Asobi ni Kitene (遊びにきてね) (21 May 1990)
- Kisses (21 September 1990)
- Friends or Lovers (10 February 1991)
- Denki to Mint-Movie Mix (電気とミント-Movie Mix) (1 March 1991)
- Asa~From day to day (あさ~From day to day) (23 August 1991)
- Moonshine (1 December 1991)
- Aozora wa Tenki Ame-Live Version(青空は天気雨-Live Version) (21 September 1992)
- Aozora ga Ippai (青空がいっぱい) (2 June 1993)
- Hana no Youni (花のように) (21 February 1994)
- Be with You (21 November 1994)

=== Video Singles ===
- Denki to Mint (電気とミント) (CD-V) (5 March 1988)

From The Planet With Love (New Version) / BRAND-NEW MENU (12inch Version) / Chasing The Rainbow / 青空は天気雨 / 電気とミント(ビデオクリップ)

- Asobi ni Kitene (遊びにきてね) (VSD) (21 September 1990)

Asobi ni Kitene (Video Clip) (遊びにきてね(ビデオクリップ))

=== Videos ===
- Psy・S 4Size
- Live Psy・S Non-Fiction Tour '88-'89
- Looking for the “Atlas” Tour
- Tri-Psy・S
- Signal Victory Tour
- Paradise Tour
- Music In Your Eyes

=== DVDs ===
- Live Psy・S Non-Fiction Tour '88-'89/Psy・S 4Size (7 September 2005)

=== Video CD ===
- Music in your Eyes (1994)
