= Metamor Jupiter =

1993 side-scrolling shooter video game

- Developer: Flight-Plan
- Publisher: NEC
- Composer: Masaya Matsuura
- Platform: PC Engine Super CD-ROM²
- Release: JP: January 22, 1993
- Genre: Scrolling shooter
- Mode: Single-player

Metamor Jupiter (Note: Japanese: メタモジュピター, Hepburn: Metamo Jupitā) is a 1993 side-scrolling shooter video game developed by Flight-Plan and published by NEC for its PC Engine Super CD-ROM².

== Gameplay ==
Gameplay screenshot

It was compatible with the PC Engine Virtual Cushion force feedback accessory.

The premise of the game is that you start with a ship that is an organic entity. Your ship can transform into three different shapes, each of them having a distinct weapon system.

Blue comets are hurling towards the Earth as they carry aliens preparing for invasion. Your mission as the protagonist is to stop the comets and invasion by destroying the alien forces.

== Development and release ==
Its music was composed by Masaya Matsuura, known for PaRappa the Rapper, and considered by IGN as the 65th best game creator of all time.

== Reception ==
Reception

Review scores
| Publication | Score |
|---|---|
| Famitsu | 5/10, 4/10, 5/10, 5/10 |
| Gekkan PC Engine | 65/100, 75/100, 70/100, 70/100, 70/100 |
| Marukatsu PC Engine | 8/10, 7/10, 7/10, 6/10 |
| Dengeki PC Engine | 65/100, 85/100, 75/100, 60/100 |
| Hippon Super! | 4/10 |

Metamor Jupiter received average reviews.
