= VIB =

VIB may refer to:

- Vidal i Barraquer, Francesc d'Assís Vidal i Barraquer, which is the name of the Institut Vidal Barraquer i Barraquer, Tarragona, 43001 or the street Carrer del Cardenal Vidal i Barraquer
- Véhicule d'Intervention Blindé, a 20mm-armed version of the Véhicule de l'Avant Blindé used by the French Air Force.
- Verliebt in Berlin, a German telenovela
- Villa Constitución Airport IATA code
- Virtual Instrumentation Beans, collection of visualization and data server components for OPC client development
- Vlaams Instituut voor Biotechnologie, a life sciences research institute in Flanders, Belgium
- VMware vSphere Installation Bundle, a packaging format to install software on VMware ESXi consisting of file archive, XML descriptor file, and signature file to convey level of trust
- Oflag VI-B, a World War II German POW camp near Dössel

Vib may refer to:

- Vib Gyor, a British band originating in Leeds
- a shortening for vibrator or vibration like in :
  - Vib-Ribbon or Vib-Ripple, two video games for PlayStation consoles
