= Rhyme Rider Kerorican =

2000 video game

- Developer(s): NanaOn-Sha, Ltd.
- Publisher(s): Bandai
- Designer(s): Masaya Matsuura
- Platform(s): WonderSwan Color
- Release: JP: December 6, 2000
- Genre(s): Music
- Mode(s): Single-player

Rhyme Rider Kerorican (ライムライダー・ケロリカン) is a music video game released in 2000 for the WonderSwan Color. Although being developed by NanaOn-Sha, it was released exclusively in Japan.

== Gameplay ==
In similarities to Vib-Ribbon, the game's plot involved the adventures of Kerorican, a female astronaut wearing kemonomimi-style frog-helmet, as she walks along accompanied by music import from NanaOn-Sha's debut game Tunin'Glue. As Kerorican continues her walk, she encounters enemies and obstacles. Kerorican must jump, duck, kick aside, or otherwise dodge these obstacles to progress and as she does so, the actions she takes add notes to the song such that the player's actions results in a generative melody. By successfully clearing obstacles, Kerorican's combo count increases for a result to reward the player a crown that acts to skip over obstacles. It is the only WonderSwan Color game to be held diagonally, although the text in the game was oblique.
