= Project Rap Rabbit =

Cancelled video game

- Developers: NanaOn-Sha iNiS
- Publisher: PQube
- Director: Masaya Matsuura
- Producer: Keiichi Yano
- Artist: Atsushi Saito
- Engine: Unreal Engine 4
- Platforms: Microsoft Windows, PlayStation 4
- Release: Cancelled
- Genre: Rhythm game
- Mode: Single player

Project Rap Rabbit is a cancelled rhythm game formerly in development by NanaOn-Sha and iNiS for PlayStation 4 and Microsoft Windows. The game, directed by Masaya Matsuura in collaboration with Keiichi Yano, is pitched as a revival of story-based rhythm games such as PaRappa the Rapper and Gitaroo Man, and features rap battle gameplay mixed with Japanese culture. Following the game's failure to secure financing on crowdfunding website Kickstarter, the game's development has been placed on hold.

== Gameplay ==
Project Rap Rabbit aimed to build upon the rhythm-based gameplay of the two companies' previous games, PaRappa the Rapper and Gitaroo Man. Set in 16th Century Japan, players are put in the role of a rabbit named Toto-maru, who must use the power of rap music to battle against powerful overlords who have corrupted the land.

The gameplay revolves around three phases; Listen, Respond, and Rap. During the Listen phase, in which the opponent raps, the player can pick up certain words that they themselves can use during their phase. In the Respond phase, players use an emotion wheel, inspired by dialogue wheels from games such as Mass Effect and Fallout 4, to determine how the player will respond to the opponent. Finally, the Rap phase has players press buttons in time to the music to perform some of the rap lyrics, which differ depending on what emotion was chosen. Both the player and opponent have Swag Gauges which go up and down depending on successful raps, and certain boosts may be applied depending on how the chosen emotion matches up with the situation. Toto-maru's status varies depending on how much Swag he has, and the game will end if he ran out of Swag.

== Development ==
Project Rap Rabbit was first revealed through an article on Rice Digital on May 2, 2017. The game was officially announced on May 12, 2017 and a Kickstarter campaign launched on May 15, 2017. The campaign was criticized for featuring no gameplay footage and setting stretch goals at unreasonable levels. The campaign ultimately failed, with pledges only reaching $203,327 of the $1,076,060 required. As a result of this failure, work on Project Rap Rabbit was discontinued and cancelled until further funding could be found.
