= Haunt (video game) =

2012 video game

- Developers: NanaOn-Sha; Microsoft Game Studios Japan; Zoë Mode
- Publisher: Microsoft Studios
- Platform: Xbox 360 (Xbox Live Arcade)
- Release: WW: January 18, 2012
- Genres: Adventure, survival horror
- Mode: Single-player

Haunt is a horror-themed adventure game developed by co-developed by NanaOn-Sha, Zoë Mode, and Microsoft Game Studios Japan and published by Microsoft Studios. It was made available for download worldwide on the Xbox 360 via Xbox Live Arcade on January 18, 2012. The game requires the Kinect peripheral.

== Gameplay ==
Haunt is played using the Kinect peripheral. Players use their body to control gameplay. One hand is used to control the on-screen flashlight, while other motions do things such as opening sarcophagi and doors. Emphasis on the player's entire body is used. For example, the player must cover their ears to avoid the loud scream of a banshee. Some sections of the game are automatically navigated, while in others players are free to roam the environment.

== Development ==
Haunt was conceived by Masaya Matsuura, with assistance and consulting by Microsoft Game Studios Japan. It was revealed at the Tokyo Game Show 2010. The game was designed to be child friendly rather than be a horror-focused title. British development team Zoë Mode created the majority of the game including programming, artwork and design with NanaOn-Sha overseeing the project. The game was originally planned for a 2011 release, but was delayed until 2012. Tim Schafer is featured as the voice of Benjamin Muldoon, the mansion's owner and narrator in the game.

== Reception ==
Haunt received generally mixed reviews, resulting in the aggregate scores of 74% on GameRankings and 70 out of 100 on Metacritic.
