= Sex (manga) =

Japanese manga series

- First tankōbon volume cover
- Genre: Action
- Manga
- Written by: Atsushi Kamijo
- Published by: Shogakukan
- Imprint: Young Sunday Comics Special (first release); Young Sunday Comics (second release)
- Magazine: Weekly Young Sunday
- Original run: 1988 – 1992
- Volumes: 2 (first release); 7 (second release)
- icon

Sex (stylized in all caps) is a Japanese manga series written and illustrated by Atsushi Kamijo. It was serialized in Shogakukan's seinen manga magazine Weekly Young Sunday from 1988 to 1992.

== Plot ==
Kaho (カホ) is a middle-school student from Fussa, Tokyo, who travels to Okinawa on a school trip. While searching for Natsu (ナツ), a childhood friend who moved to the island years earlier, she encounters Yuki (ユキ), a boy who reminds her of Natsu. She follows him, hoping for news of her friend, but becomes entangled in Yuki's dangerous dealings with local yakuza. She departs Okinawa without finding Natsu, though she catches a fleeting glimpse of him at the airport.

One year later, now a high-schooler, Kaho unexpectedly reunites with both boys, who are living together in a US military housing unit near Yokota Air Base. Yuki runs a business serving American base personnel, while Natsu attends high school. Kaho soon moves in with them, and the three begin an unconventional cohabitation, navigating their intertwined lives against the backdrop of cross-cultural tensions and the American military presence in Japan.

== Publication ==
Written and illustrated by Atsushi Kamijo, Sex was serialized in Shogakukan's seinen manga magazine Weekly Young Sunday from 1988 to 1992. Shogakukan initially collected its chapters in two wideban volumes, under the Young Sunday Comics Special imprint, released on November 13, 1989, and August 5, 1993; however, the publication of the third volume onwards was halted due to the author's own decision. Over ten years later, Shogakukan republished the series in seven tankōbon volumes from November 5, 2004, to May 2, 2005. Shogakukan re-released the series in five bunkoban volumes from August 10 to December 15, 2012. To commemorate the 30th anniversary of the series, Shogakukan released a four-volume edition titled Sex 30th AnniversaryEdition; the volumes were released from March 25 to August 31, 2017. A promotional video, animated by MAPPA and directed by Sayo Yamamoto, titled Sex: Prologue, was launched as a home video exclusive to customers who purchase all four volumes in March 2018.
