= Vib-Ripple =

2004 video game

- Developer: NanaOn-Sha (Note: Additional work by Japan Studio)
- Publisher: Sony Computer Entertainment
- Designer: Masaya Matsuura
- Platform: PlayStation 2
- Release: JP: May 27, 2004
- Genre: Action
- Mode: Single-player

Vib-Ripple (Note: Japanese: ビブリップル, Hepburn: Biburippuru) is a 2004 video game developed by NanaOn-Sha and published by Sony Computer Entertainment for the PlayStation 2. It was designed by Masaya Matsuura, who also led the development the 1999 PlayStation game Vib-Ribbon, to which Vib-Ripple is a sequel. It was released exclusively in Japan.

The game was first mentioned in a catalog list of presentation at the 2002 Game Developers' Conference with a talk by Masaya Matsuura titled "The Game Design of Vib Ribbon 2".

Vib-Ripple is notable for allowing the player to import photographs to be used as the game's playing field.

== Gameplay ==
The player takes control of Vibri, a simple, vector-shaped rabbit from the game's predecessor Vib-Ribbon. The game puts the player on top of various photographs, using each one as a trampoline. Jumping on a photograph loosens up 2D items called "Peta Characters", which Vibri must collect before a time limit expires. An icon on the left side of the screen gives the player a hint as to what part of the photograph to jump on to find the item; the icon's color, shape, and size corresponds to a certain combination of the three on the photograph. When Vibri is close enough to the item, a drumming sound is made and the controller vibrates. Vibri must also avoid creatures called "Boonchies" that inhabit the surface of the picture. Coming in contact with a Boonchie will cause Vibri to de-evolve from a rabbit, to a frog, to a worm, and eventually cause a Game over. However, it is possible for Vibri to evolve into a form called "Super Vibri", allowing the player to temporarily disable a Boonchie, as well as see hidden Peta Characters.

Vib-Ripple has 60 default photographs. The player can create their own stages by uploading their own photographs from a digital camera or cellphone via the PlayStation 2's USB port, or even send pictures across the system's online network. The game automatically scales photographs down to 256 by 256 pixels.

== Reception ==
Vib-Ripple received mixed reception, with IGN saying it was "too different" from its predecessor but said it had lots of replay value due to the import feature. However, Jeuxvideo said it lacked replay value due to only having one gamemode.

Reception

Review scores
Publication	Score
GamesTM	7/10
Jeuxvideo.com	12/20

== See also ==
- Mojib-Ribbon
