= Major Minor's Majestic March =

2009 video game

- Developer: NanaOn-Sha
- Publisher: Majesco: JP: Square Enix
- Designer: Masaya Matsuura
- Artist: Rodney Greenblat
- Platform: Wii
- Release: NA: March 24, 2009; JP: April 23, 2009; EU: June 26, 2009
- Genre: Music
- Mode: Single-player

Major Minor's Majestic March (メジャマジ・マーチ, Mejamaji Māchi) is a music video game for the Wii. Developed by NanaOn-Sha, it was the developer's final collaboration with Masaya Matsuura and artist Rodney Greenblat.

== Gameplay ==
Major Minor’s Majestic March uses the Wii Remote as a mace (a form of baton used exclusively by drum majors) that the drum major, Major Minor, uses to keep tempo, recruit new band members and pick up items. While marching through eight locations that contain various events, Major Minor strives to create the most impressive parade ever. Players can add up to 15 different instruments to their procession—including brass, woodwinds, and percussion—to alter its composition and resulting performance. Players are then scored on how well their band maintains its rhythm and manages obstacles that could otherwise throw the procession into disarray. The band keeps tempo to more than 25 popular marching band songs from around the world, composed into original medleys for each stage.

== Development ==
Designer Masaya Matsuura had been introduced to marching band music, which, in combination with considering the Wii Remote similar to a band baton, lead him to come up with the idea for this game. However, he didn't want the game to just be about controlling the music's tempo, so he also added the ability to use magic to give animals instruments and allow them to join the band.

The development was a troubled one, with the game's artist, Rodney Greenblat, expressing that "pretty much everything went wrong" with it.

== Reception ==
Reception

Aggregate score
Aggregator	Score
Metacritic	46/100

Review scores
Publication	Score
Game Informer	3.00/10
GameSpot	4.5/10
GameZone	6.0/10
IGN	5.0/10

Major Minor's Majestic March received "generally unfavorable reviews" according to review aggregator website Metacritic.

Major Minor's Majestic March sold poorly in Japan at only 600 copies in its first two days, failing to enter the Media Create top fifty for its week of release. 300 copies were given away to readers of V-Jump. Issue number 202 of Edge Magazine scored the game 3 out of 10. Reviews on the Run gave the game 0.0 from Jose "Fubar" Sanchez, and 0.5 from Victor Lucas, two of the lowest scores possible, with the main complaints from both being that "the damn controls don't work!" Nintendo Power gave it a 6.0. According to Game Informer's Matt Helgeson, who gave the game a 3.0 out of a possible 10: "If I'm going to spend a long period of time with my hand wrapped around an oblong object, moving my arm rapidly up and down, it sure won't be with this game".
