= Yoko Fujita =

Japanese actress, singer, and model (born 1980)

- 藤田 陽子
- Born: 10 June 1980 (age 46); Nara Prefecture, Japan
- Occupations: Actress; model; singer
- Years active: 1999–

Yoko Fujita (藤田 陽子, Fujita Yōko; born 10 June 1980, in Nara Prefecture) is a Japanese actress, singer, and model. She is represented by Humanitè.

== Biography ==
She initially joined Laugh and Peace as a vocalist, and debuted in January 1999 with the single "Chotto kī te na". She is also active as a model in fashion magazines such as Seda and soup. Her first starring role in a film was on Inuneko, produced in 2004 and co-starring Kanako Enomoto.

In 2005, she married theatre director Noda Hideki.

== Filmography ==
Year	Title	Role	Notes
2002	Mobōhan	Yumiko Takai	
2004	Walking with The Dog	Miki Furukawa	
2004	Inuneko	Suzu	
2004	D.P		
2005	In the Pool		
2006	Death Trance	Goddess	
2006	Koroshi no harawata		
2006	Yotsuya Kaidan		
2007	Kemono ga nigeru		
2007	Hito no Sex o Warauna	Painter	
2007	High Pitcher		Internet-exclusive short film
2007	Shin-Onna Tachiguishi Retsuden: Kusama no Sasayaki Kōri Ichigo no Kumi	Kumi	
2008	Tea Fight	Midori Yagi	
2008	Kill: Assault Girl2		
2009	Kuma no Kami		
2009	Tochika		
2014	Nishino Yukihiko no Koi to Bōken	Crutch woman	

=== Advertisements ===
Years	Product	Notes
2000	Shiseido Hana no Hadamizu	
2001	FT Shiseido "Tissera Toconuts Coconuts"	Co-starred with Porno Graffitti
2001	Japan Tobacco	
2002–03	Nova	
2003	Vodafone Japanese corporation	Chichi no Tanjōbi, Happy Bonus Restaurant
2003	McDonald's	
2005	imju "dejavu Fiber Wig Nuru tsuke matsuge"	
2006	Tokiwa Pharmaceutical Nanten noDoame	

=== TV programmes ===
Dates	Title	Network	Notes
	Love Love Aishiteru	CX	Served as a chorus member of Love Love All Stars
Apr–Jun 2005	3-Kagetsu Topic Eikaiwa: Tsuitachi Marugoto Eigo de Hanasou!	NHK	

=== Radio programmes ===
Title	Network
Yoko Fujita no Beat Kids Street	Air-G'

=== Music videos ===
Year	Artist	Song	Notes
2008	Captain Strydom	"Wagamama Chuck"	
2008	DJ Ozma	"Roppongi Tsunderella"	
2009		"Yanyan Machiko"	Anime; as Machiko (voice)

== Discography ==
=== Singles ===
Year	Title	Label	Notes
1999	Chotto kī te na	Epic Records Japan	As Laugh&Peace Featuring Yoko Fujita
1999	Sphere	Sony Music Entertainment Japan	Mirai Shōnen Conan II: Tiger Adventure theme; produced by pal@pop

=== Albums ===
Year	Title	Label	Notes
2002	Atai no Namida	Ki/oon Music	
2004	The Taste of Tea	JVC Kenwood Victor Entertainment	Recorded "A Katsuhito Ishui Film 'The Taste Of Tea' Original Soundtrack"; Katsuhito Ishii directed The Taste of Tea theme song; in the name Little Tempo/Yoko Fujita

=== Video game music ===
Date	Title	Label	As
9 Dec 1999	Vib-Ribbon	PlayStation, Sony Interactive Entertainment	Laugh&Peace Featuring Yoko Fujita

=== Video game soundtracks ===
Date	Title	Label	As
7 Jul 2004	Vib-Ripple & Vib-Ribbon: Original Soundtrack	King Record	Laugh&Peace Featuring Yoko Fujita
