= Musika =

2007 video game

- Developer: NanaOn-Sha
- Publishers: Apple; Sony BMG
- Designer: Masaya Matsuura
- Platform: iPod
- Release: August 7, 2007
- Genre: Music
- Mode: Single-player

Musika is a music video game created for the iPod by Masaya Matsuura. Originally called Rhythmica, Musika was created exclusively for the iPod click wheel interface and is considered similar in format to the rhythm game, Phase, also for iPod. Matsuura has said in interviews that his decision to make the game for the iPod was a simple decision because "[m]any years ago Apple's tools first opened [his] eyes to the power of music and multimedia, so it's exciting [for him] to release [his] first game for this device."

== Gameplay ==
Musika is a music-generated game and as such it is played using the songs already on the iPod it is played on. To play, the player selects a song from the list of all songs available and plays it. As the music plays, the player is challenged to press the Select button (the only button used to play the game) as soon as a character (letter or number) from the song's title appears in the field. The faster this is done, the more points are earned. For every 5 letters selected correctly and for every completed song, score multipliers build up the more correct letters you get in a row. High scores can lead to development of bonus icons, which act to protect the player against misses, passes and blocks.

== Development ==
Musika began development in 2006. Matsuura brought up the idea to the NanaOn-Sha team, who proceeded to make an early prototype of what would become Musika. Soon after at the Tokyo Game Show in 2006, now defunct record and publishing company Sony BMG Music Entertainment was fond of the prototype that the NanaOn-Sha team had created, and soon after became the publisher for Musika on the iTunes store.

According to Matsuura, the creation of Musika was made during a "jam session" type of development. By the time the games development was complete, the NanaOn-Sha team had already moved on to their next project, however Sony BMG decided to publish Musika on the iPod. The NanaOn-Sha team did not have an iPod developer, so they sent the source code to a development company in Texas, who proceeded to convert the game to iPod.

== Reception ==
Professional ratings
Review scores
Source	Rating
Macworld	3/5
Pocket Gamer	6/10
Destructoid	8/10

Musika released on August 7, 2007. The game was published by Sony BMG Music Entertainment and was priced at $4.99 on the US iTunes store.

Critics praised the art style, visual effects, and transitions, however the game received criticism for the lack of gameplay variation outside of the main gameplay loop.
