= PaRappa the Rapper 2 =

2001 rhythm video game

- European cover art
- Developer: NanaOn-Sha (Note: Additional work by Japan Studio.)
- Publisher: Sony Computer Entertainment
- Designer: Masaya Matsuura
- Artist: Rodney Greenblat
- Writer: Gabin Ito
- Composers: Masaya Matsuura; Yoshihisa Suzuki
- Platforms: PlayStation 2; PlayStation 4
- Release: JP: August 30, 2001; NA: January 23, 2002; PAL: 2002
- Genre: Rhythm
- Modes: Single-player, multiplayer

PaRappa the Rapper 2 (Note: Japanese: パラッパラッパー2, Hepburn: Parappa Rappā Tsū) is a 2001 rhythm video game developed by NanaOn-Sha and published by Sony Computer Entertainment for the PlayStation 2. It is the third and most recent title in the PaRappa the Rapper series, following Um Jammer Lammy. The game was made available for the PlayStation 4 through the PlayStation Network in December 2015.

== Gameplay ==
An example of game-play, where the player must match their button presses to the symbols shown on screen.

The gameplay follows that of its predecessors, in which the player must press buttons to make PaRappa rap in response to a teacher's lyrics. Players earn points and progress by rapping in time to the music and maintaining a Good rating through to the end of each level. By successfully improvising raps, the player can obtain a Cool rating, during which PaRappa will be given the chance to rap freestyle by himself, although it can be lost if the player performs badly, which will drop the rating down to Good. However, they will drop down a rating to Bad and Awful if they are currently on Good, with the player losing if they drop below Awful or end the song with a Bad or Awful rating. PaRappa 2 features some tweaks to the gameplay, as some of the teacher's lyrics may change based on the player's performance. For example, the lyrics may become simpler if the player is struggling, or become tougher if they perform well. After clearing two stages in a row, players can participate in a minigame where they must hit targets held out by Chop Chop Master Onion's Tamanegi students, earning bonus points which are added onto the previous level's score. Clearing each level with a Cool rating unlocks music tracks that can be listened to after completing the game. Each time the player clears the game, the color of PaRappa's hat changes from blue, to pink, to yellow, with each hat remixing the lines in each level. In addition to the single player campaign, the game features a two-player Vs. Mode, in which players are given a line to rap to, which they must improve upon by freestyling better than their opponent.

== Plot ==
PaRappa, having won a lifetime's worth supply of instant noodle products from Beard Burger's burger shop, has become nothing short of weary from eating nothing but noodles for every meal every single day. When PaRappa complains about being served noodles by his crush, Sunny Funny, he becomes shocked when she calls him a baby, causing him to question his own maturity.

PaRappa and his friend P.J. Berri decide to eat at Beard Burger instead, where they shockingly discover that for some reason, the burgers have turned into noodles. From a poster, the Beard Burger Master, the founder of Beard Burgers, comes back as a ghost and helps PaRappa make a "Traditional Parappa Town Burger". Afterwards, PaRappa and P.J. learn that a mysterious phenomenon is turning all the food in town, not just burgers, into noodles. Papa PaRappa and General Potter, PaRappa and Sunny's respective fathers, try to develop an invention that can stop the "noodlization." However, they inadvertently shrink themselves in the process.

PaRappa and P.J. then participate in a workout on an adult show run by Chop Chop Master Onion, not knowing that their fathers are stuck small by Papa PaRappa's invention. PaRappa is then seen kissing Pj, and PaRappa presses a remote for a different T.V. show but accidentally shrinks both P.J. and himself, along with their friends and some other people. They are soon helped out by the Guru Ant and return to normal size. After undergoing army training under Instructor Moosesha, PaRappa helps rescue Hairdresser Octopus from being hypnotized into giving people afros.

Later, PaRappa discovers "Food Court", a video game cartridge, to be the cause of the "noodlization". PaRappa's father warns them that if a player loses the game, the cartridge will curse them to only be able to eat noodles. Despite this, PaRappa insists that he should be the one to complete the game.

Upon winning the game, PaRappa's father reverse engineers the cartridge to create a device that can reverse the noodlization. PaRappa and the others use sweets and the de-noodlization devices to combat against the Noodle Syndicate, who are behind the town's noodlization. They soon confront the mastermind, Colonel Noodle, who is revealed to be the son of Beard Burger Master. Similar to PaRappa's situation, he grew weary from eating burgers for every meal all his life (not helped by it causing his friends to rejecting him on his first birthday party, and his mother turning into a burger from eating so many), deciding upon discovering his love for noodles that they should rule the world instead. Thankfully, PaRappa manages to convince him to be more open-minded about various types of food, and he becomes good.

As everyone celebrates in a party from MC King Kong Mushi, Sunny assures PaRappa that he's more mature than what he thinks himself to be. Everything returns to normal, excluding the situation repeating itself when he wins a lifetime supply of cheese.

== Soundtrack ==
PaRappa the Rapper 2

Soundtrack album by Yoshihisa Suzuki and Masaya Matsuura
- Released: 2001
- Genre: Video game music
- Length: 65:41
- Label: Sony Records

PaRappa the Rapper 2 had its soundtrack named after its game. A promotional video of the song "Say 'I Gotta Believe!'" was released, featuring members of De La Soul as chefs, mixed with clips of PaRappa.

All tracks are written by Yoshihisa Suzuki and Masaya Matsuura.

PaRappa the Rapper 2
No.	Title	Length
1.	"Noodle Monster"	0:28
2.	"Boring"	1:07
3.	"Enter Parappa 2"	0:47
4.	"Say "I Gotta Believe!"" (featuring De La Soul and Double, also written with Kelvin Mercer, Dave Jolicoeur and Vincent Mason)	4:15
5.	"Now Loading"	0:06
6.	"Open the Door"	0:07
7.	"Noodle Talk"	1:02
8.	"Listen to Boxy Boy!"	1:14
9.	"Enter Daydreams Part 2"	0:10
10.	"I Gotta Believe! Part 2"	0:11
11.	"Toasty Buns"	2:53
12.	"Completion of the Noodlizer...?"	1:28
13.	"Opening Theme of Romantic Karate"	0:51
14.	"This Is Pleasant"	0:20
15.	"Romantic Love"	3:34
16.	"Karate Funk"	2:20
17.	"Channel War"	1:46
18.	"BIG"	4:00
19.	"Strategy Meeting"	1:58
20.	"You Guys Go That Way"	0:11
21.	"Sista Moosesha"	3:38
22.	"Uproar at the Gym"	0:58
23.	"Afro Forest"	0:27
24.	"A Lovely Hairstyle"	0:11
25.	"Hair Scare"	3:04
26.	"Dad's Secret"	2:41
27.	"Food Court"	3:51
28.	"Candy Attack"	2:48
29.	"Noodles Can't Be Beat"	3:21
30.	"Come a Long Way"	4:08
31.	"Always Love!"	5:02
32.	"Boring Again"	1:59
33.	"Say "I Gotta Believe!" (Funkyboard Mix) - Bonus Track" (featuring De La Soul and Double, also written with Kelvin Mercer, Dave Jolicoeur and Vincent Mason)	4:29
Total length:		65:41

== Marketing and release ==
In Japan, McDonald's released a demo disc alongside its Happy Meal, containing a demo of the first level which was changed to resemble a McDonald's restaurant. The disc also came with a demo of Ape Escape 2001.

== Reception ==
Reception

Aggregate score
Aggregator	Score
Metacritic	67/100

Review scores
Publication	Score
1Up.com	B−
AllGame	2.5/5
Computer and Video Games	6/10
Eurogamer	7/10
Famitsu	31/40
GamePro	4/5
GameRevolution	C−
GameSpot	6.6/10
GameSpy	81%
GameZone	6/10
IGN	7/10
X-Play	3/5
Entertainment Weekly	C−

The game received "mixed or average" reviews according to the review aggregation website Metacritic.

GameSpot's Jeff Gerstmann gave the game a 6.6, stating that "an almost total lack of innovation makes the game seem pretty dated when compared with other games on the market. ... Even when played to perfection, though, the rapping still sounds just as stuttery as it did in the previous game. While it was excusable then and perhaps even a little charming, it would have been nice to see the developers make better use of the PlayStation 2's higher specs". Though the game "features the same 2D graphical style as its predecessor, but it's not without its share of enhancements", he added: "The music in the game covers a lot more ground, genre-wise, than the original did, but none of it is especially funny or toe-tapping – with the exception of the level that takes place inside an old video game machine. PaRappa 2 isn't a bad game, but it doesn't have as much of the same off-beat charm that the original – and to a lesser extent, Um Jammer Lammy – had". However, IGN's Douglass C. Perry gave the game a slightly better score of 7: "The game concept hasn't changed, leaning neither toward an evolutionary or even a moderate change in the way gamers play music games. ... [PaRappa 2 is] not as hard as Um Jammer Lammy (which may be good for some folks), and it certainly covers familiar territory when it comes to the essentials – gameplay, graphics, and sound – but it's still fun and happy-making".
