= To-y =

Japanese manga series by Atsushi Kamijo and its OVA adaptation

- First tankōbon volume cover, featuring To-y Fujii
- Genre: Musical
- Manga
- Written by: Atsushi Kamijo
- Published by: Shogakukan
- Imprint: Shōnen Sunday Comics
- Magazine: Weekly Shōnen Sunday
- Original run: April 3, 1985 – March 25, 1987
- Volumes: 10
- Original video animation
- Directed by: Mamoru Hamatsu
- Written by: Izo Hashimoto
- Music by: Masaya Matsuura
- Studio: Studio Gallop
- Released: October 1, 1987
- Runtime: 55 minutes
- icon

To-y is a Japanese manga series written and illustrated by Atsushi Kamijo. It was serialized in Shogakukan's shōnen manga magazine Weekly Shōnen Sunday from 1985 to 1987, with the chapters collected in ten tankōbon volumes. It tells the story of GASP, an underground punk rock band, and their attempt to get a recording contract and attain stardom. To-y was adapted into an original video animation (OVA) in 1987.

== Plot ==
The story follows To-y Fujii (藤井冬威), lead singer of GASP, and his attempts not to sell out during his rise through the recording industry. The story also follows To-y's growing relationship with Niya Yamada (山田二矢), as the two find comfort in one another while they are shunned by mainstream society.

== Media ==
=== Manga ===
To-y is written and illustrated by Atsushi Kamijo. It was serialized in Shogakukan's Weekly Shōnen Sunday from April 3, 1985, to March 25, 1987. Shogakukan collected its chapters in ten tankōbon volumes released from September 18, 1985, to June 18, 1987. Shogakukan re-published the series in six bunkoban volumes between January 17 and May 16, 1997. Shogakukan re-released the series into a five-volume deluxe edition for its 30th anniversary between December 21, 2015, and April 25, 2016.

==== Volumes ====
No.	Japanese release date	Japanese ISBN
1	September 18, 1985	4-09-121351-0
2	November 18, 1985	4-09-121352-9
3	January 18, 1986	4-09-121353-7
4	March 18, 1986	4-09-121354-5
5	June 18, 1986	4-09-121355-3
6	September 18, 1986	4-09-121356-1
7	November 18, 1986	4-09-121357-X
8	February 18, 1986	4-09-121358-8
9	April 18, 1986	4-09-121359-6
10	June 18, 1987	4-09-121360-X

=== Original video animation ===
The manga was adapted into an original video animation (OVA) by Gallop, directed by Mamoru Hamatsu, with character designs by Naoyuki Onda, and art direction by Shichirō Kobayashi. Masaya Matsuura was in charge of the music, and his band Psy-S provided the theme songs; "Lemon no Yūki" (Lemonの勇気) and "Cubic Lovers". It was released on October 1, 1987, on VHS, LaserDisc, Betamax and Video High Density. On June 30, 2021, Sony Music Entertainment Japan, who produced the OVA, released it on a limited remastered edition Blu-ray set.

== Legacy ==
To-y was a pioneer of band-themed manga and has served as an influence to other manga series like Beck and Nana.

In 2007, Justin Sevakis of Anime News Network reported that a frame-by-frame digital restoration of the To-y OVA was being done by fans. He cited it as the first fan restoration in the anime community.

Visual kei rock band Penicillin took their name from the group Penicillin Shock seen in To-y, and titled their first album after the fictional band. In 2015, Atsushi Kamijo drew the album cover for Penicillin's Memories ~Japanese Masterpieces~.

Professional wrestler Toi Kojima changed his ring name to "To-y" in February 2024. He explained that his parents were fans of Kamijo and To-y and had named him after the series, so he will now be using the ring name to honor it and bring more attention to pro-wrestling.
