= Virtual Cushion =

The Virtual Cushion (Note: Japanese: バーチャルクッション, Hepburn: Bācharu Kusshon) is a video game force feedback accessory released in 1992 for the NEC PC Engine. It allows players to feel the impact of enemy attacks on their bodies through sound vibrations.

In 1993, GamePro reported that the product could be launched for Turbo Duo owners. Electronic Gaming Monthly and Game Mania stated that a similar device was being produced by Matsushita Electric.

== Reception ==
Consolemania called the idea "stupid." Electric Brain wrote a full review recommending the accessory, noting that it also works with other consoles.

== Legacy ==
In 1994, VideoGames - The Ultimate Gaming Magazine recommended the Aura Interactor for fans of the Virtual Cushion.

In 1999, Markt+Technik's Video Games called the Virtual Cushion "the first Rumble Pack in the history of video games."

In 2016, HobbyConsolas remembered it as an innovative peripheral from the 1990s.
