= Mojib-Ribbon =

2003 video game

- Developer: NanaOn-Sha (Note: Additional work by Japan Studio)
- Publisher: Sony Computer Entertainment
- Producer: Masaya Matsuura
- Designer: Masaya Matsuura
- Artist: Kiri Matsuura
- Writer: Seiko Ito
- Composers: Laugh and Peace; Masaya Matsuura
- Platform: PlayStation 2
- Release: JP: November 20, 2003
- Genre: Music
- Modes: Single-player, multiplayer

Mojib-Ribbon (Note: Japanese: モジブリボン, Hepburn: Mojiburibon) is a 2003 music video game developed by NanaOn-Sha and published by Sony Computer Entertainment for the PlayStation 2. It was released only in Japan, and is similar in gameplay to Vib-Ribbon, NanaOn-Sha's previous game.

Mojib-Ribbon focuses the gameplay on the player's interaction with the lyrics. As such, the music employed in the game is heavily lyrics-oriented rap music. The game's art-style is centered on traditional sumi-e and Japanese kana calligraphy. This has led to claims that the game is incomprehensible to non-Japanese audiences, however the simplicity of gameplay have allowed numerous import gamers to enjoy the game as well, and guides exist online regarding menu navigation instructions for non-Japanese speakers.

== Gameplay ==
In Mojib-Ribbon, the player plays the part of Mojibri (モジブリ, Mojiburi) (a name similar to that of Vibri from Vib-Ribbon), a character drawn in the sumi-e style who wishes to become a famous rapper (similar to PaRappa the Rapper) and to find the truest rap of them all. In each level, Mojibri walks around a circle of clouds as rap lyrics written in kana pass underneath. The player must press up on the joystick to get Mojibri to dip his fude in the suzuri and then down to get Mojibri to write the kana as he sings it. The songs are heavily rhythm-based raps, and the player must time the application of the fude to the washi during lyrics and to the suzuri during breaks.

Later in the game Mojibri is joined by a female friend named Mojiko (モジコ) and a huge robot called Osorezan 1999 (オソレザン一九九九, Osorezan ichikyūkyūkyū). These characters have individual calligraphy styles.

== Development ==
Mojib-Ribbon was initially teased as Vib-Ribbon 2 before being revealed at the 2002 Game Developers Conference. Masaya Matsuura and J-pop band Laugh and Peace returned from Vib-Ribbon to compose Mojib-Ribbon's music, with the lyrics written by Japanese rap pioneer Seiko Ito. Mojib-Ribbon was originally planned to be released in Europe, with Matsuura also working to get it published in America.

== See also ==
- Ōkami, a 2006 video game done in the Ink and wash painting (sumi-e) style
