= Masaya Matsuura =

Japanese video game designer and musician

Masaya Matsuura 松浦 雅也
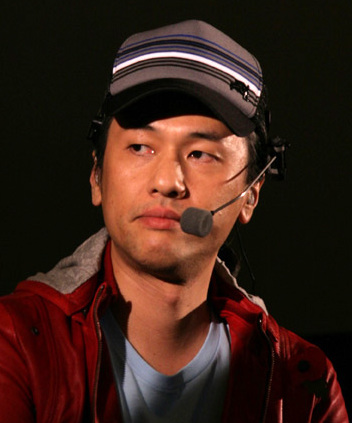
- Matsuura in 2009

Background information
- Born: June 16, 1961 (age 64); Osaka, Japan
- Origin: Osaka
- Genres: Video game music; crossover; pop rap; funk rock; J-pop; electronic; synth-pop
- Occupations: Musician, video game designer
- Instruments: Keyboard; synthesizer; guitar; digital audio workstation
- Years active: 1980–present

Masaya Matsuura (松浦 雅也, Matsūra Masaya) (born June 16, 1961) is a Japanese musician and video game designer based in Tokyo, Japan. He was born in Osaka on June 16, 1961, and majored in Industrial Society at Ritsumeikan University. He has worked extensively with music production, sound design, and visuals, and has been active with the J-pop duo Psy-S. He has also been credited with popularizing the modern music video game at his studio NanaOn-Sha.

In 2009, he was chosen by IGN as one of the top 100 game creators of all time.

== Career ==
In April 1983, shortly after he graduated from Ritsumeikan University, Matsuura met singer Chaka (Mami Yasunori) and founded Psy-S. The band's debut album, Different View, was released in 1985. The group's musical style is a mixture of experimental synthesizer, electric guitar, and vocals. Matsuura is the band's composer and arranger, and he performs using a Fairlight CMI synthesizer. He has also mastered the keyboard, guitar, and bass and he occasionally performs these instruments on stage as well.

In the late 1980s, the group enjoyed a fair degree of popularity in Japan thanks to their several hits. Certain of their songs have been used in such anime series, including City Hunter, and in films. In 1987, he was revealed to be the composer and musical director for an OVA adaption of Atsushi Kamijo's manga, To-Y.

Technological development occurring during the 1990s generated gained interest in himself creating computer-based music and from this field, and soon transitioned into interactive music and music video games. In 1993, Matsuura became the first Japanese musician to release the Macintosh CD-ROM, The Seven Colors, for which he was awarded the "Multimedia Grand Prix". In June 1996, after having produced 10 albums with Psy-S (and four "best of" albums), he left the band and focused his attention on his multimedia projects.

The same year, he founded the Tokyo-based production company, NanaOn-Sha, and began the development of video games. After said company's Japan-only debut release of Tunin'Glue, their first major project was revealed to be a unique game—which combines hip hop rhythms with the visual talents of American illustrator Rodney Greenblat from California. Released in December 1996 in Japan, PaRappa the Rapper is regarded as one of the first modern music video games, specifically being dubbed the first rhythm game. Matsuura's talent for combining music and gameplay would later be demonstrated with his 1999 release of the generative rhythm game Vib-Ribbon (Acquired by MoMA in 2012), and would cement his position as one of the pioneers of the music video game industry.

Together with said company in 2003, they were responsible for producing the audio portion of Sony's third-generation robotic dog toy, AIBO (model ERS-7). This included both music and sound design.

In 2004, he was given the "First Penguin" award by the International Game Developers Association (IGDA) for his innovative contributions to the video game industry.

== Discography ==
Masaya Matsuura has released 10 studio albums and 4 greatest hits albums with Psy-S, and 2 solo albums. All albums were released under the Sony Music label.

=== With Psy-S ===
- 1985 – Different View
- 1986 – PIC-NIC
- 1987 – Collection (Compilation)
- 1988 – Mint-Electric
- 1989 – Atlas
- 1990 – Signal
- 1991 – Two Hearts
- 1991 – Holiday
- 1992 – Two Spirits Live PSY'S Best Selection (Live)
- 1993 – Window
- 1994 – Home Made
- 1994 – Emotional Engine
- 1996 – Two Bridge (Compilation)
- 1998 – Brand New Diary + Another Diary (Compilation)
- 2012 – Psyclopedia (CD Box Set)

=== Solo ===
- 1989 – Sweet Home
- 2013 – Beyooond!!!

== Games ==
- Metamor Jupiter (1993, PC Engine CD) as music composer
- The Seven Colors: Legend of PSY・S City (1993, Apple Macintosh)
- Tunin'Glue (1996, Apple Bandai Pippin)
- PaRappa the Rapper (1996, PS1),(2007, PSP),(2017, PS4)
- UmJammer Lammy (1999, PS1),(2008 PS3)
- Vib-Ribbon (1999, PS1),(2014 PS3)
- Rhyme Rider Kerorican (2000, Bandai WonderSwan)
- PaRappa the Rapper 2 (2002, PS2),(2015, PS4)
- Mojib-Ribbon (2003, PS2)
- Vib-Ripple (2004, PS2)
- Tamagotchi Connection: Corner Shop (2005, Nintendo DS)
- Musika (2007, iPod)
- Tamagotchi Connection: Corner Shop 2 (2007, Nintendo DS)
- Tamagotchi Connection: Corner Shop 3 (2007, Nintendo DS)
- Major Minor's Majestic March (2009, Wii)
- WINtA (2010, iPhone/iPod Touch)
- Haunt (2012, Xbox 360)
- Beat Sports (2015, Apple TV)
- Furusoma (2016, iOS)
- Project Rap Rabbit (Cancelled)

== Prizes and awards ==
- 1997 – Multimedia Grand Prix (Creator Awards) • MMCA Artist Award
- 1998 – Interactive Achievement Awards • Game Design and Sound Design (for PaRappa The Rapper)
- 1998 – IGDA Spotlight Awards • Innovative Game Design, Use of Audio and Game Soundtrack (for PaRappa The Rapper)
- 2000 – Interactive Achievement Awards • original music composition (for UmJammer Lammy)
- 2004 – Game Developers Choice Awards • First Penguin Award 2004
