= Dazzeloids =

1994 video game

- Developer: Rodney Greenblat
- Release: 1994

Dazzeloids is a 1994 children's CD-ROM game created by Rodney Alan Greenblat, who also made PaRappa the Rapper. It features Anne Dilly Whim, and her team of boredom banishers fighting the forces of mediocrity set by the Mediogre and his geeky assistant, Pin Bleeper.

== Plot ==
In a fictional place called Boredomtown, a little kid named Jeremy had become a brain-washed zombie, from watching too much television. Unless Yendor Talbeneerg, Titan Rose, or Stinkabod Lame can help. First they go on a ride on the Dazzelwagon to Jeremy's home. Then the reader can decide where the story will go. Yendor can use the brain fun stimulation device to cure Jeremy's brain, while Titan Rose can smash the victim's TV and read him some poems. As for Stinkabod, he can do a silly dance. Jeremy's mom thanks the Dazzeloids and gives them a feast. Whatever the reader chooses, it's a different snack each time.

One morning, Stinkabod's hamster had been diseased by the Fuzzy Rodent Flu. So Anne Dilly Whim calls the police, and they say the pet shop was there 10 minutes, and later it wasn't. All thanks to the Mediogre and his assistant, Pin Bleeper. So Yendor, Titan, and Stinkabod explore the lot where the petshop vanished minutes ago, until they realize they are getting sucked into nothingness by the Transglumifier. Now this story has 5 endings instead of 3. Anne decides to create a machine called the Vibrobeam to send back her crew and the pet shop back. The 3 decide to do different things. Yendor wants to overload his Personal Distress Assistant. Titan Rose wants to chant The Sacred Chant of the Great Tomb of the Giant Swami. And finally, Stinkabod wants to flush a toilet so it can cause an Anti-Reverse Whirlpool. Lastly, Mediogre wants Pin Bleeper to activate the Transglumifier for a more boring reaction. But he must choose a Lava Lamp Power Cell. Whatever the choices are, the pet shop will come back and make the bank vanish. In addition, Stinkabod's hamster will become better.
