= Atsushi Kamijo =

Japanese manga artist

Atsushi Kamijo (上條 淳士, Kamijō Atsushi; born March 12, 1963 in Tokyo, Japan) is a Japanese manga artist. At times he is billed as "Atsushi Kamijo and Yoko", which refers to Yoko Murase, his assistant. Kamijo is known for his stylish designs, which often use pure white backgrounds with very little middle ground between black and white. Atsushi made his debut in a special issue of Shonen Sunday in 1983 with the story "Mob Hunter".

His past assistants include Katsutoshi Kawai and Makoto Ito. He has also produced advertisements and CD album covers.

== Works ==
- Mob Hunter (モッブ★ハンター)
- Tanteibu Monogatari (探偵部物語)
- Kaiketsu Iinkai (怪傑委員会)
- Go West (ごお・うえすと)
- Boy, Kimi wa Kanpekisa (ボーイ、きみは完璧さ)
- Yatsura ga Saikou! (やつらが最高!)
- Ai to Seishun no Tabidachi (愛ト青春ノ旅ダチ)
- Zingy (written by Tetsu Kariya)
- Mitsurin Densetsu (密林伝説)
- Saigo no Hero (最後のヒーロー)
- To-y
- Arigachi Dayona (ありがちダよなっ)
- Yamada no Koto (山田のコト) (To-Y spin-off)
- Brazil Kara no Tegami (ブラジルからの手紙) (To-Y spin-off)
- Sakuse Sugoroku (サクセすごろく)
- To-y Saishuukai?! (TO-Y最終回?!)
- Giraffer Boy
- Taiga Rock Manga Rensai Yokoku (大河ロック漫画連載予告!?)
- Kyuukyoku (Shigo) no Assistant no Yoko to wa?! (究極 (死語) のアシスタントの要項とは?!)
- Let It Roll
- Flowers of Romance
- Hana no Pyunpyunmaru (花のピュンピュン丸)
- Sex
- Rock Michi (ロック道)
- After Sex
- Aka X Kuro (赤×黒)
- Aka X Kuro Gaiden (赤×黒 外伝)
- 8 (エイト)
- Kaerenai Futari (帰れない二人)
- Counter (カウンター)
- Dog Low (ドッグ・ロウ)

=== Anime ===
- Endless Night short film – Character designer
- Space Dandy – Character designer for Johnny – Ep. 20
