= Vib-Ribbon =

1999 video game

- Developer: NanaOn-Sha (Note: Additional work by Japan Studio)
- Publisher: Sony Computer Entertainment
- Producer: Masaya Matsuura
- Designer: Masaya Matsuura
- Composers: Laugh and Peace; Masaya Matsuura
- Platforms: PlayStation; PlayStation 3
- Release: PlayStation: JP: 9 December 1999; EU: 30 August 2000; PlayStation 3: NA: 7 October 2014; JP: 8 October 2014; EU: 15 October 2014
- Genre: Rhythm
- Mode: Single-player

Vib-Ribbon (Note: Japanese: ビブリボン, Hepburn: Bibu Ribon) (stylized vib-ribbon) is a 1999 rhythm video game developed by NanaOn-Sha and released by Sony Computer Entertainment for the PlayStation. The game came out in Japan on 9 December 1999 and in Europe on 30 August 2000, but was never released for the PlayStation in North America; it was re-released on the PlayStation 3 via PlayStation Network in October 2014, which finally brought the game to North America in addition to Japan and Europe. NanaOn-Sha had previously developed the PaRappa the Rapper series of games for Sony.

The game was initially commissioned as an advertisement for the Mercedes-Benz A-Class car. After design issues surfaced with the car and the ad plan was dropped, development continued as a stand-alone game. Masaya Matsuura returned to lead Vib-Ribbon. The game's software loads into the console's RAM, allowing the player to remove the game disc and insert music CDs to play custom levels; the game can generate a unique level from any track on a standard audio CD. The graphics for Vib-Ribbon are simple, consisting of straight, white vector lines forming crude, angular drawings of the level and the player character, named Vibri.

Vib-Ribbon has received generally positive reviews from critics, praising its minimalist visuals and innovative concept, and has garnered a cult following; though the game has also received criticism for its simplistic gameplay and design. It spawned two Japan-only follow-ups: Mojib-Ribbon (2003) and Vib-Ripple (2004).

== Gameplay ==
An in-game screenshot, where the player-character Vibri runs through a loop, one of the game's basic obstacles

Vib-Ribbon is a rhythm game in which players guide Vibri the rabbit across a line filled with obstacles tied in correspondence to the beat of the song, in a dimension called Music World. Stages contain four basic obstacles; block, loop, wave, and pit, which require players to press the L1, R1, X, or Down buttons respectively at the right time to navigate. Sometimes two obstacles will be merged, requiring the player to press two buttons at the same time (for example, a block and pit combination will require players to press L1 and Down together). Not pushing a button at the right time turns Vibri into a scribbled version of herself temporarily. Getting hit by obstacles too many times will degenerate Vibri from a rabbit into a frog, followed by an insect. Getting hit too many times while in insect form will end the game. Successful actions will help Vibri recover back to her higher forms, and clearing enough obstacles in succession while in the rabbit form will evolve Vibri into Super Vibri, increasing the player's score until Vibri is hit.

The player's score is tallied via symbols during the gameplay and converted into points at the end of the run. Earning a high score will cause Vibri to sing a congratulatory song based on their position. The base game features six songs divided into bronze, silver, and gold courses containing two songs each. Once the game is loaded onto the PlayStation, players can remove the disc and insert their own music CDs to play stages generated from its tracks. Players have the option of selecting a single track from the CD or playing all tracks consecutively. The difficulty varies depending on the intensity of the music.

== Development ==
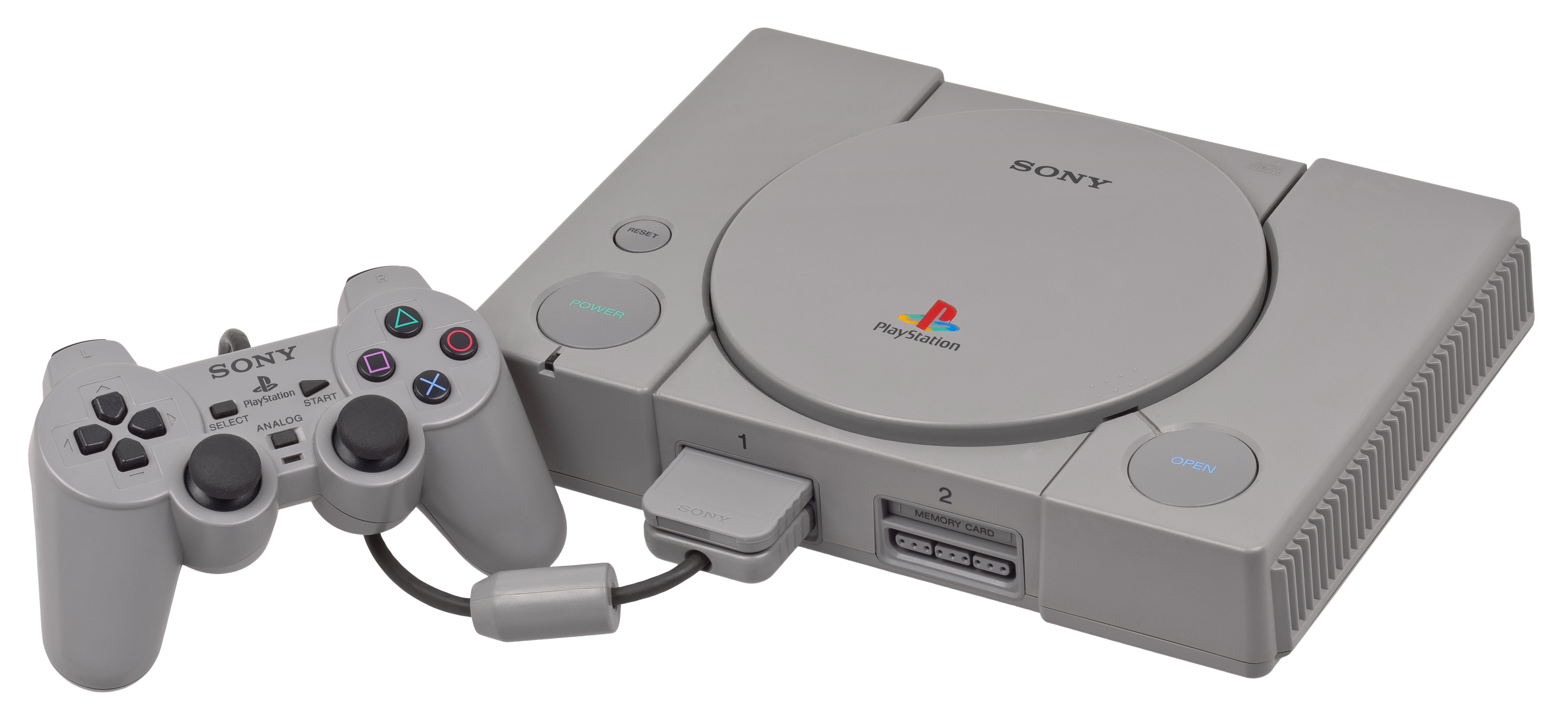
Vib-Ribbon runs completely from the PlayStation's memory pool after it is loaded the first time, allowing the Vib-Ribbon disc to be removed and music CDs to be inserted into the console to generate custom stages.

Vib-Ribbon was developed by NanaOn-Sha with a team of eleven people including Masaya Matsuura as designer and producer. The project began shortly after the completion of PaRappa the Rapper (1996) when Mercedes-Benz contacted Sony to promote their then-upcoming A-Class car. Matsuura was motivated by the concept of music-generated stages after fans repeatedly asked him to create games of their preferred music genre. The first prototype used polygon graphics with the player character represented as a living automobile. The levels were initially represented as roads taking the shape of audio waveforms created by extant music. Mercedes-Benz dropped the concept after the car failed the moose test, resulting in the game's development continuing as an original project. During the initial prototype's development, Matsuura felt the levels were too similar for capturing only bass drum frequencies and was having difficulties with the levels synchronizing with the audio. This led him to stop developing the game after a year and a half in development. He decided to resume development after his team encouraged him to continue and one programmer discovered how to analyze CD audio using the PlayStation's hardware.

Vib-Ribbon's minimalistic wireframe visuals were chosen based on Matsuura's love of early computer graphics, and the technical requirements of the game's software being small enough to play within the PlayStation's memory after its initial load. The gameplay was designed to use both hands on the controller based on Matsuura's addiction to drumming and noted efficient drumming required using both left and right hands. The automatic music-generation concept was implemented when a programmer found a way to make the PlayStation analyze music CDs; the system looks eight seconds ahead of what the player is listening to and generates obstacles based on "interesting" frequency changes. Vibri's voice was produced using a NTT Communications' Speech Synthesizer.

The soundtrack was composed by J-pop band Laugh and Peace, with vocals consisting of Toshiyuki Kageyama, Koichi Hirota, and Yoko Fujita. (Note: Also credited as Laugh and Beats) Matsuura instructed them to create music that fit the game's world without giving players the impression that a particular style of music is associated with the game. Working with the band, Matsuura wanted a soundtrack that would encourage players to use their music CDs. Reluctance to associate the game with a music genre was a big part of why the game's visuals are so color-neutral and simple. A soundtrack was released by King Records titled Vib-Ribbon & Vib-Ripple Original Soundtrack. (Note: ビブリップル&ビブリボン オリジナルサウンドトラック) A second soundtrack was released on vinyl in 2020 by Minimum Records, featuring the unreleased song "Rainbow".

== Release ==
Vib-Ribbon was released in Japan on 9 December 1999, and in PAL regions on 30 August 2000. The North American release was skipped as Sony Computer Entertainment America were reportedly unimpressed with the game's simplistic graphics, causing fans to campaign for an American release, which Matsuura supported. In December 2000, Sony Magazine released a promotional picture book in Japan titled Vibri-hon: Vibri and Fun Vibri Dictionary. (Note: ビブリホン:ビブリと楽しいビブリ語辞典, Biburihon: Biburi to tanoshī biburi-go jiten)

At E3 2014, Vib-Ribbon was referenced by Shawn Layden, the then-newly appointed CEO of Sony Computer Entertainment of America. Layden was not aware the game had not been released in America at the time, which resulted in people on the Internet interpreting the mention of the game as a hint of a North American release despite the company having no plans to do so. A group of Twitter users became displeased when there was no further mention of the game during the press conference. When Layden realized his mistake, he asked his team to work on perfecting a North American port for PlayStation Network. It was released on 7 October in North America with Layden writing an apology for the confusion. It was released in Japan the following day and in Europe on 15 October.

== Reception ==
Reception

Review scores
Publication	Score
GameFan	94/100
GameSpot	7/10
Hardcore Gamer	3.5/5
Hyper	83%
PlayStation Official Magazine – Australia	7/10
PlayStation Official Magazine – UK	7/10
Play	91%
Dengeki PlayStation	85/100, 85/100, 80/100, 75/100
TechnologyTell	B

Vib-Ribbon sold 100,000 units in Japan within its first week. The game was received positively by reviewers.

When reviewing the visuals, GameSpot's Jeff Gerstmann noted that the minimalistic style gives it a defining look and adds to the game's appeal. The simplistic wireframe design was picked up by TechnologyTell, stating the graphics were "impressive" and "minimalistic". Hyper reviewer, Cam Shea, felt the minimalistic visuals were refreshing due to other video games attempted to outdo one another with graphic fidelity. Shea praised the visual concept of evolution to show progress, and thought the game was sending a philosophical message of "survival of the fittest". Mike Wilcox of PlayStation Official Magazine – Australia, who bashed the visuals upon initial review, would later realize the visuals were intentional and not an insult to one's hubris. However, PlayStation Official Magazine – UK's Dan Mayers considered the visuals overall to be "too strange to avoid gawping at".

Vib-Ribbon's gameplay reception was mixed, with Hardcore Gamer calling the game "cruel on the highest difficulty", and that the ability to use one's own CDs in the game was "flawed" and "ridiculous" but "deserving of a 2nd chance". TechnologyTell described the timing as "inconsistent" but "refreshingly difficult" and a "great concept".

GameFan considered the game to have a "solid soundtrack".

== Legacy ==
The game spawned a spinoff, Mojib-Ribbon, which focused on rap music and calligraphy; and a sequel, Vib-Ripple, which was similar to Vib-Ribbon but instead used digital images loaded into the game to generate the levels. Both were released in Japan only for the PlayStation 2. In 2012, the game was acquired by the Museum of Modern Art as part of its permanent collection of video games. In 2020, the game was celebrated among numerous other PlayStation franchises in the PlayStation 5 launch title Astro's Playroom, where a Vib-Ribbon stage is seen being played within the location "Caching Caves".
