= NanaOn-Sha =

Japanese video game developer

- Native name: 株式会社七音社
- Type: Kabushiki-gaisha
- Industry: Video games
- Founded: 1993; 33 years ago
- Founder: Masaya Matsuura
- Headquarters: Jingūmae, Shibuya, Tokyo, Japan
- Products: PaRappa the Rapper; Um Jammer Lammy; Vib-Ribbon
- Website: nanaon-sha.co.jp

NanaOn-Sha Co., Ltd. (株式会社七音社, Kabushiki-gaisha NanaOn-Sha) is a Japanese video game developer founded by Masaya Matsuura in 1993. The title of the company is Japanese for the number seven, sounds, and the word “company”.

== History ==
In 1993, Matsuura founded the Tokyo-based production company, NanaOn-Sha, which began the development of video games. He was mainly involved in the development of the industry but in various sound productions, including his music activities.

In 1996, They released Tunin'Glue for Apple Pippin in Japan. They also developed PaRappa the Rapper for the PlayStation—the same year which the Tunin'Glue marked their collaborative debut with Californian visual artist Rodney Alan Greenblat. However, it was completed and was regarded as the first modern music video game, the game was initiated as a franchise, which included a spin-off, Um Jammer Lammy–which is based on guitar samples and a proper sequel, PaRappa the Rapper 2.

In 1999, they also developed Vib-Ribbon. Only released in Japan and PAL regions, the game was later released in North America on the PSN store under the PS1 classic in 2014. In 2010, the studio co-developed WINtA, an anti-war rhythm game in which most of its profits went to charity.

== Games ==
Year	Title	Platforms	Publisher	Notes
1996	Tunin'Glue	Apple Pippin	Bandai Games	
1996	PaRappa the Rapper	PlayStation	Sony Computer Entertainment	
1999	Um Jammer Lammy	PlayStation, Arcade	Sony Computer Entertainment	
1999	Vib-Ribbon	PlayStation	Sony Computer Entertainment	
2000	Rhyme Rider Kerorican	Wonderswan Color	Bandai Games	
2001	PaRappa the Rapper 2	PlayStation 2	Sony Computer Entertainment	
2003	Mojib-Ribbon	PlayStation 2	Sony Computer Entertainment	
2004	Vib-Ripple	PlayStation 2	Sony Computer Entertainment	
2005	Tamagotchi Connection: Corner Shop	Nintendo DS	Bandai/Atari	
2007	Tamagotchi Connection: Corner Shop 2	Nintendo DS	Bandai Namco Games	
2007	Tamagotchi Connection: Corner Shop 3	Nintendo DS	Bandai Namco Games	
2007	Musika	iPod	Apple Inc.	
2008	Tamagotchi no Kira Kira Omisecchi	Nintendo DS	Bandai Namco Games	
2009	Major Minor's Majestic March	Wii	Majesco/Square Enix	
2010	Tamagotchi no Pichi Pichi Omisecchi	Nintendo DS	Bandai Namco Games	
2010	WINtA	iOS	ngmoco	Co-developed with Triangle Studios
2012	Haunt	Xbox 360	Microsoft Studios	Co-developed with Zoë Mode
2012	Cho~ricchi! Tamagotchi no Puchi Puchi Omisecchi	Nintendo 3DS	Bandai Namco Games	
2015	Tribe Cool Crew: THE G@ME	Nintendo 3DS	Bandai Namco Games	
2016	furusoma	iOS, Android	NanaOn-Sha	
Cancelled	Project Rap Rabbit	Windows, PlayStation 4	PQube	Co-developed with iNiS
