= Um Jammer Lammy =

1999 rhythm video game

- North American cover art featuring Lammy and Katy
- Developers: NanaOn-Sha (Note: Additional work by Japan Studio.); Namco (arcade)
- Publisher: Sony Computer Entertainment
- Designer: Masaya Matsuura
- Artist: Rodney Alan Greenblat
- Composers: Masaya Matsuura; Yoshihisa Suzuki; Shigeyoshi Kawagoe
- Platforms: PlayStation, arcade
- Release: PlayStation: JP: March 18, 1999; NA: August 17, 1999; EU: September 10, 1999; Arcade: JP: December 15, 1999
- Genre: Rhythm
- Modes: Single-player, multiplayer
- Arcade system: Namco System 12

Um Jammer Lammy (Note: Japanese: ウンジャマ・ラミー, Hepburn: Un Jama Ramī) is a 1999 rhythm video game developed by NanaOn-Sha and published by Sony Computer Entertainment for the PlayStation. It is a spin-off and follow up to 1996's PaRappa the Rapper, once again featuring the collaboration of music producer and game designer Masaya Matsuura and artist Rodney Alan Greenblat. An arcade version co-developed by Namco, titled Um Jammer Lammy NOW!, was released in Japanese arcades in December 1999. The game received generally positive reviews from critics.

== Plot ==
The game revolves around a shy lamb named Lammy (Sara Ramirez), a left-handed guitarist and leader of a rock band named MilkCan, alongside bassist and lead singer Katy Kat and drummer Ma-san. Although normally a nervous wreck, Lammy becomes much more confident once she has a guitar (real or imaginary) in hand. On the night before MilkCan is due for their first concert, Lammy has a dream of performing alongside Chop Chop Master Onion, only to realize she had been playing a vacuum cleaner the entire time. As Lammy laments how she is nothing without her guitar, Chop Chop tells her about how he lost his dojo, but it remains in his mind, complete with a casino, leaving behind the words "Dojo, Casino, It's all in the mind".

Lammy wakes up and realizes she only has 15 minutes to get to her concert. While running to the concert, she is blocked off by a fire. As Chief Puddle attempts to get Lammy to help put out the fire since she's in a hurry, Lammy notices a billboard for a casino. Recalling Chop Chop's words, Lammy pictures her fire hose as a guitar and gains the confidence she usually has whilst playing. After putting out the fire, Lammy is rewarded with some pizza but eats so much that she is mistaken as a pregnant lady by Nurse Cathy Piller. Upon realizing she wasn't actually pregnant, Cathy asks Lammy to help put all the newborns to sleep using a baby as a guitar. As Lammy leaves she slips on a skateboard and is launched into a plane that was flying through the street. She then helps Captain Fussenpepper fly the plane while he is attacked by a ceiling panel by using her yoke as a guitar, which makes him switch personalities. She ends up crash landing the plane into the middle of a full parking lot. Accidentally leaving her guitar on the plane upon leaving, Lammy goes to build a new one from scratch with the help from a beaver named Paul Chuck. By pretending her chainsaw is a guitar, she is able to turn a tree in to a fully functional and painted guitar.

In the Japan/PAL version of the game, upon getting the guitar, Lammy slips on a banana peel and dies, ending up in a Hell-like nether world. In the US version, her belt gets snagged on a door handle in the shop, and she is propelled to a volcanic island. After being dragged into performing in a concert for idol Teriyaki Yoko (The Alien Girl), Lammy manages to earn the right to be brought back to Earth using a fax machine, but not before running into her evil twin Rammy, Yoko's original guitarist. After coming back from the dead (Japan/PAL)/returning from the island (US), Lammy finally arrives at the concert at the same time as Katy and Ma-san, who had their own set of circumstances causing them to run late as Lammy had been. With the band together, MilkCan go ahead and perform their concert before their adoring fans.

By completing Lammy's story, a side story focusing on the main character of the overall series, PaRappa, is unlocked. In PaRappa's side-story, Katy asks PaRappa, PJ Berri and Sunny Funny to help prepare for her live concert. This inspires PaRappa and PJ to start up their own rock and roll band, which falls short due to PJ's idea of what's considered 'rock and roll'.

== Gameplay ==
Stage four of the game, "Fright Flight!!".

Um Jammer Lammy follows on from the gameplay of PaRappa the Rapper, albeit with a stronger focus on guitar playing. Each of the levels sees Lammy playing alongside a teacher, with play alternating between the teacher and Lammy. Symbols appear on a scrolling score at the top of the screen, with an icon depicting whose turn it is. After the teacher sings a line and the player's controller vibrates, the player must hit the corresponding buttons to make Lammy play a response. The player can either follow the symbols exactly or attempt to freestyle to earn some extra points. Successfully performing freestyle lines will allow the player to advance from the normal Good rank to Cool, in which the teacher leaves the screen and the player can freestyle however they feel until the end of the song, or if their freestyling is not good enough, they return to Good. If the player successfully inputs a code displayed on the loading screen whilst in Cool Mode, they will enter Fever Mode where massive points can be earned. However, if the player performs badly, they will drop to Bad and subsequently Awful rank, and will need to perform well to climb back up to Good. The song is failed if the player drops below Awful, or if the player is in Bad or Awful rank when the level ends. The player progresses by reaching the end of the song in either Good or Cool rank.

There are two levels of difficulty: Normal is the default level, as pictured, with specific buttons to press and saving after each level. Easy is a practice level for stages 1–6, where any button can be pressed on the line, but there is no option to save.

In Lammy's storyline, starting stages 2 onward unlocks various sound morphers (Flanger, Harmonizer, Wah-Wah, Distortion, and Reverb) that can be selected with the Select button whilst playing as Lammy or Rammy. These morphers affect the sound of the guitar playing, while the Harmonizer can be further modified by using an analogue controller. The player may also use the back shoulder buttons (L2 and R2) to use the guitar's wammy bar. These modifiers are completely optional as they have no impact on points gained.

At the beginning of the game, the only mode available is Lammy's Solo mode. After clearing a level with Lammy (except Stage 1), the player unlocks Co-op and Vs. modes for Lammy and Rammy. These modes can be played with a second player, or one player with a computer partner (with the option to use one controller for both available after completing all Co-op levels), controlling Lammy (purple line) and Rammy (black line) with play alternating between the two. In Co-op mode, the two players must play harmoniously to progress, with points and rank changes determined by how well they both performed (e.g. if Player 1 performs slightly well on a line but Player 2 performs really badly on the next, the result will be a negative score and a rank drop.) Conversely in Vs. mode, players must try to outperform each other, with points earned or depleted depending on the differences between each player's scores for each set of lines. Completing Lammy's solo mode also unlocks PaRappa's Solo mode, in which players control PaRappa as he uses rap skills in his own interpretations of each of the stages except Stage 1. Clearing all of the levels in all the modes unlocks a bonus mode where players can listen to the various songs, without the riffs or raps, and the characters on screen can perform actions with the face buttons.

== Development and release ==
After the success of 1996's PaRappa the Rapper, Sony was eager to release another game in the series. Instead of a direct sequel, Matsuura opted for a spin-off. Artist Rodney Greenblat disagreed with this direction, although he was outvoted. Matsuura also wanted to get away from the rap genre saying that the genre "has been criticized as being too temporary" opting instead to focus on rock music. Greenblat again had doubts about this direction, recalling to Gamasutra, "What is rock music? I mean, is it Aerosmith? Is it Lynyrd Skynyrd? Is it Elvis? Elvis Costello? Where are we? What are we doing exactly? And how are you going to do the rap kind of thing, with the call and response? Because that's what PaRappa really was, a call and response game; teacher says one thing and PaRappa repeats it".

The team was larger and there was more pressure on them to make a hit game, at one point the game started to go into a more psychedelic direction. Greenblat at one point suggested that the game should instead go for a more Goth theme but the rest of the team disagreed. Greenblat noted that the popularity of the internet helped ease development as he and Matsuura could more easily share ideas where as before they had to use a fax machine. The design for Lammy was influenced by Australian pop star Natalie Imbruglia.

In response to players complaining about the lack of difficulty of PaRappa the Rapper, Matsuura intentionally made Um Jammer Lammy "hard to play", however the outcome of this led to the game being considered incredibly difficult by critics. The system for gauging how well the player performed was considered to be volatile and even random at times which contributed to the large difficulty of the game.

=== Arcade version ===
The arcade version of the game, entitled Um Jammer Lammy NOW!, is played using a unique guitar controller. The buttons for Triangle, Circle, Cross and Square are represented by strummers in the middle of the guitar, the L button is represented by a slider at the top of the guitar (dubbed the 'Joe Switch'), and the R button is represented by a scratch disc at the bottom (dubbed the 'Chin Switch'). Nearly all the attract mode cutscenes are unique to this version, and even features a "Got to Move! (Millennium Girl)" music video, as well as full interviews with the MilkCan band members. The gameplay is identical to the console version, albeit some of the game's lines are changed to make it easier to play with the guitar controller.

Additionally, all 7 stages are broken up into three difficulty tiers, with each tier having three stages each:

- Easy Stages: 1, 2, 3
- Normal Stages: 2, 4, 5
- Hard Stages: 5, 6, 7

Unlike the console version, Stage 1 can be played as PaRappa.

In 2023, after years of it being considered lost, an arcade cabinet owned by the English broadcaster Jonathan Ross was documented online and portions of the data were archived.

=== North American version ===
Several changes were made for the game's North American release, which are not found in the Japanese and PAL versions of the game. Most notably, in Stage 6, Lammy no longer goes to Hell after slipping on a banana peel and dying. Instead, she snags her belt on a door handle and is flung onto a volcanic island. Reflecting the new theme of the level, Lammy wears camouflage gear instead of her regular clothing. Lyrics were also changed; in Stage 1, Chop Chop Master Onion says "you can play on an island" instead of "you can play in Hell" (referencing the changes to Stage 6), and in Stage 5, which features a lumberjack, anything that implied deforestation was pleasant was removed.

=== Digital re-release ===
The game was released on the PlayStation Network in Japan on February 27, 2008 and in North America on October 1, 2009. The release was playable on PlayStation 3 and PlayStation Portable.

=== Music ===
A single release of one of the game's songs, "Got to Move! (Millennium Girl)", was released in Japan on April 21, 1999. Three soundtracks inspired by the game have been released in Japan by SPE Visual Works. The game's original soundtrack was released on November 20, 1999. An album by in-universe girl band MilkCan, Make It Sweet!, was released on June 19, 1999, featuring variations on Um Jammer Lammy's songs with vocals by Michele Burks as Katy Kat. Finally, PJ And PaRappa: I Scream!, which features remixed versions of the game's songs with original lyrics performed by Dred Foxx as PaRappa, was released on September 22, 1999.

Fernandes Guitars released several licensed electric guitars in 2000 to tie into the game: three different finishes depicting characters from Um Jammy Lammy and PaRappa the Rapper for their ZO-3 model guitar and the UJL-2000, a short scale replica of the guitar used by Lammy in-game.

== Reception ==
Reception

Aggregate score
Aggregator	Score
GameRankings	83% (21 reviews)

Review scores
Publication	Score
AllGame	2.5/5
Edge	6 out of 10
Famitsu	9/10, 9/10, 9/10, 8/10
Game Informer	8.25 out of 10
GameRevolution	B
GameSpot	8.4 out of 10
IGN	8.6 out of 10
Next Generation	5/5
Official U.S. PlayStation Magazine	3.5/5

The game was given generally favorable reviews according to the review aggregation website GameRankings. GameSpot's Jeff Gerstmann commented on the game's sound, graphics and originality: "While the game isn't a strict sequel, it does take place in the same universe, with the same graphics style and nearly identical gameplay. ... [T]he additional levels, the two-player option, and the inclusion of the Parappa remixes in Um Jammer Lammy add a value that Parappa the Rapper simply can't touch. But keep in mind that the game doesn't stray far from the formula, and the game's difficulty will put off those who never mastered Parappa. So, to put it another way, if you didn't play Parappa to death and love every minute of it, you might as well skip out on Um Jammer Lammy". Similarly, IGN's Jay Boor commented on the gameplay, story, graphics and sound: "If you can look past all the crazy effects and wild animations, the plot isn't as funny, or as cute, as Parappa the Rapper’s. In fact, it was kind of bland. ... But the rest of the game is sweet. ... Um Jammer Lammy is a great addition to the Parappa cosmos... [and] has so much more that Parappa didn't have". GameRevolution called it "a cool game, if for no other reason than to entertain sufficiently inebriated party guests. It's easily the most insane mish-mash of psychadelia [sic] yet seen on a console, and at least deserves a shot (or the whole bottle, even)", but criticized the story, calling it "the most obtuse, disjointed, drug-induced mess of a story that has ever been conceived, period". The site even went so far as to rate the game as #40 on the list of the Top 50 Worst Game Names Ever. Next Generation said of the Japanese version, "any game that includes a stage dive deserves five stars out of hand".

The alternate American version of Lammy's Stage 6, however, drew mixed praise and criticism. IGN's Boor called it "a far off island [that] has that Japan-idol-talk influence... So if you were expecting to see one of the levels being in hell, well, it's not in there". Similarly, GameSpot's Gerstmann made a later update on his March 26, 1999 review by commenting on the American alterations to Stage 6, exclaiming: "It doesn't really affect the game too much, since much of the game doesn't make a lot of sense to begin with".

Um Jammer Lammy won E3 1999 Game Critics Awards in the categories "Best Puzzle/Trivia/Parlor Game" and "Outstanding Achievement in Sound". The game also received the "Outstanding Achievement in Original Music Composition" award from the Academy of Interactive Arts & Sciences at the 3rd Annual Interactive Achievement Awards.
