= PaRappa the Rapper =

1996 rhythm video game

- Japanese cover art
- Developer: NanaOn-Sha (Note: Japan Studio assisted on development. PSP and PS4 ports developed by epics.)
- Publisher: Sony Computer Entertainment
- Producer: Masaya Matsuura
- Designer: Masaya Matsuura
- Artist: Rodney Greenblat
- Writer: Gabin Ito
- Composers: Masaya Matsuura; Yoshihisa Suzuki
- Platforms: PlayStation; PlayStation Portable; PlayStation 4
- Release: PlayStation: JP: 6 December 1996; EU: 26 September 1997; NA: 17 November 1997; PlayStation Portable: JP: 7 December 2006; EU: 6 July 2007; NA: 17 July 2007; AU: 9 August 2007; PlayStation 4: WW: 4 April 2017; JP: 20 April 2017
- Genre: Rhythm
- Mode: Single-player

PaRappa the Rapper (Note: Japanese: パラッパラッパー, Hepburn: Parappa Rappā) is a rhythm video game developed by NanaOn-Sha and published by Sony Computer Entertainment for the PlayStation. It was originally released in Japan in 1996 and worldwide in 1997. Created by music producer Masaya Matsuura in collaboration with artist Rodney Greenblat, the game features unique visual design and rap-based gameplay and is considered to be the first true rhythm game. It was ported to the PlayStation Portable in 2006 in celebration of its 10-year anniversary. A remastered version of the original PlayStation game was released for PlayStation 4 in 2017 for the game's twentieth anniversary.

PaRappa the Rapper was acclaimed by critics, who praised its music, story, animation, and gameplay, though its short length was criticized. Several publications list it as one of the best video games ever made. It spawned two follow-up titles; a guitar-based spin-off titled Um Jammer Lammy, released in 1999 for the PlayStation, and a direct sequel, PaRappa the Rapper 2, released for the PlayStation 2 in 2001. The game was also influential in setting the basic template for the rhythm game genre, including franchises such as the Bemani and Harmonix games.

== Gameplay ==
An example of gameplay in PaRappa the Rapper. The player must match the on-screen symbols with their button presses in accordance with the rhythm of the song.

PaRappa the Rapper is a rhythm game in which the main character, PaRappa, must make his way through each of the game's six stages by rapping. As the teacher raps, a bar at the top of the screen will appear, showing symbols that match up to the teacher's lyrics. The player must then make PaRappa rap in response to the teacher by pressing the buttons with the correct timing to match the teacher's line.

During gameplay, a "U Rappin'" meter determines the player's performance, ranking it as either Awful, Bad, Good, or Cool. By consistently staying on beat, players will stay in the Good ranking area. If the player performs a bad line, a lower ranking will flash, and if the player performs badly twice in a row, they will drop to Bad, followed by Awful. To regain a higher ranking, the player must play well twice in a row to move up a rank. To clear a stage, the player must have a good ranking by the end of the song. If the player ends the song on a Bad or Awful ranking or drops below the Awful ranking at any point in the song, they will fail the song and have to start over. After the game has been cleared once, the player can attempt to achieve a Cool ranking. This is achieved by freestyling in a manner different from the predetermined lyric. If the player performs a successfully impressive freestyle when the Cool rank is flashing, they will enter Cool mode. In this mode, the teacher will leave the stage, allowing the player to rap freely and earn some large points. If the freestyling fails to impress twice in a row, the teacher will return and gameplay will resume in the Good ranking. Ending the stage with a Cool rank results in a special level ending, and clearing all stages on Cool Mode unlocks a bonus mode with characters Katy Kat and Sunny Funny.

Rank-changing aspects of a level are only apparent during the first of every two lines. If the player successfully times the first line of a pair but fails on the second, the rank meter will not blink Bad or Awful. Likewise, once the game has been cleared, a Good play is only necessary on the first of every two lines to be able to get Cool mode on the second line.

== Plot ==
The player takes on the role of PaRappa, a paper-thin rapping dog, determined to procure the heart of a flower-like girl he has a crush on named Sunny Funny. However, he is intimidated by the presence of Joe Chin, a rich, self-centered dog going overboard making efforts to obtain Sunny's attention. In order to win Sunny, PaRappa learns to do karate at a dojo, and earns a driver's education course to get a license. However, when he crashes his father's vehicle, he has to earn money at a flea market to pay for a replacement vehicle. When Sunny's birthday comes up, PaRappa has to get her a cake but ends up ruining it after an encounter with Joe Chin. He makes a new one by watching a cooking show and proceeds to eat a lot of it on the day. When spending some time alone with Sunny, he is suddenly overcome with the need to go to the bathroom and has to rap against his former teachers to get to the front of the queue. Then one night, PaRappa is invited to Club Fun, and asks Sunny to go with him, to which she agrees. PaRappa then raps on stage with everyone, rapping solo at the end of the song showing that he's interested in Sunny.

== Songs ==
There are six songs, all in the style of rap:

Song number	Title	Alternative Title
1	Chop Chop Master Onion's Rap	Kick! Punch!
2	Instructor Mooselini's Rap	Driver's Test
3	Prince Fleaswallow's Rap	Flea Market
4	Cheap Cheap the Cooking Chicken's Rap	Seafood Cake
5	All Master's Rap	Full Tank
6	Parappa's Live Rap with MC King Kong Mushi	PaRappa's Live Rap

== Development ==
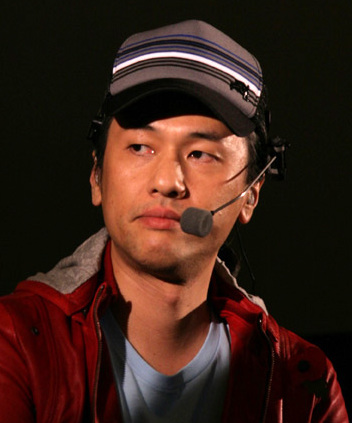
Lead designer Masaya Matsuura

The game was designed by Masaya Matsuura, who at the time was a musician in the band PSY.S. Matsuura hated appearing in music videos and began working on interactive software as an alternative outlet. Game development started in 1994, before the release of the PlayStation. At the time Sony Computer Entertainment Japan was attempting to produce as many games as they could, which were worked on in two divisions. One division worked on popular genres and the other, internally known as "Division Zero", according to artist Rodney Greenblat, "just did whatever". PaRappa was a product of Division Zero. Japan Studio assisted on development.

Greenblat got involved with the project after an SCE producer suggested that he and Matsuura work together, having both expressed interest in working with the PlayStation console. Greenblat had already worked with other divisions within Sony and was fairly popular in Japan, particularly for his CD-ROM Dazzeloids. Similar to the Paper Mario series, all of the characters appear to be two-dimensional beings cut from paper while the surroundings are primarily three-dimensional. On his website, Greenblat remembers that making the characters flat was Matsuura's idea, after creating a mock-up with characters from Greenblat's Dazzeloids CD-ROM. The game's title is a wordplay referencing the flat characters; "PaRappa" is a variant of the Japanese word for "paper thin".

After deciding on designing a music game Matsuura went through multiple ideas such as having a game centered around singing or playing the guitar. Matsuura was particularly inspired by the musical practice of sampling and claimed "the most interesting thing about sampling was people's voices", and thus wanted to create a music game using actual voices and by extension one based around rap.

By the time Greenblat began working on the game, the basic structure of the game had formed. Greenblat would create characters based on outlines created by Matsuura. Several of the main characters were already designed and owned by Greenblat, including PJ Berri and Katy Kat. One of the first designs Greenblat created specifically for the game was that of the main character, PaRappa, who initially took the form of a shrimp. Occasionally Greenblat's designs would cause the game's story to change. Greenblat noted that he ended up having more input because the other team members felt that some of his characters exceeded their expectations, which prompted the writers to adapt to his characters by changing the story itself. For instance, after Greenblat came up with the idea of an onion for the Karate teacher character, the idea was changed to make him an onion master.

The game's soundtrack was made using samplers rather than MIDI synthesizers, which were common at the time. Initially all of the teachers' songs used sampled vocals. These could, however, not be used in the final game and were redone "while maintaining the concept of each tune". The lyrics were written in Japanese by Matsuura and then translated by rapper Ryu Watabe while he was freestyling. All of the music was recorded at a studio in New York. The game is also one of the first PlayStation games to use in-game motion capture in order to portray more realistic character movement. The development budget was around ¥90 million, which was about £587,000 or $920,000 (equivalent to $2,000,000 in 2025).

Promotion for the game proved to be somewhat of a problem. Before this, there had been no similar games, and the team struggled with what genre to market the game as. Many staff members at Sony felt that PaRappa did not qualify as a game and Matsuura himself recalls initially being unsure as well. The game, however, became massively successful, which prompted SCEA, despite having a strict policy against 2D games, to release the game in North America. According to Greenblat, SCEA did not know how to market the game and aimed its marketing primarily at children, a demographic he noted would have trouble completing the game.

== Reception ==
Reception

Aggregate score
Aggregator	Score
Metacritic	(PS) 92/100 (PSP) 67/100 (PS4) 61/100

Review scores
Publication	Score
1Up.com	B−
Computer and Video Games	7.0/10
Electronic Gaming Monthly	(PS) 8.25/10
Eurogamer	7/10
Famitsu	8/10, 9/10, 9/10, 5/10 (PS)
Game Informer	(PS) 8.25/10 (PSP) 8/10
GamePro	(PSP) 3.5/5
GameRevolution	C−
GameSpot	(PS) 8.5/10 (PSP) 6.5/10 (PS4) 6/10
GameSpy	3.5/5
GamesRadar+	3.5/5
GameTrailers	6.5/10
GameZone	(PSP) 6.9/10
IGN	(PS) 9/10 (PSP) 6.8/10
Next Generation	(PS) 5/5
Official U.S. PlayStation Magazine	5/5
PSM3	(PSP) 7.5/10
Dengeki PlayStation	85/100, 85/100, 90/100, 85/100

Upon release in Japan, PaRappa the Rapper had an initial shipment of only 30,000 units in its first week, which was a small amount for a first-party title due to low expectations from Sony. The game kept selling at a steady rate of around 20,000 units per week and went on to surpass expectations. It sold 761,621 copies in Japan during 1997, making it the 7th best-selling video game of 1997 in the country. In May 1998, Sony awarded the game a "Platinum Prize" for sales above 1 million units in Japan alone. As of 2003, the game has sold 1.47 million copies in Japan and 214,398 copies in the United States, for a combined 1,684,398 copies sold in Japan and the United States.

The game received near-universal acclaim from critics, who hailed PaRappa the Rapper as a unique game with irresistibly catchy songs. Dan Hsu of Electronic Gaming Monthly commented, "Several of the tunes are so catchy, you'll be singing them for days." Hsu also made it his pick for "Sleeper Hit of the Holidays". IGN wrote that "while the words may seem a little strange ... this just adds to the quirky nature of the game. The music is top-notch as well." GamePro concurred: "The melodies are funk phenomenons, and the raps are so silly, they'll make you laugh in spite of yourself." The graphics and animation were also widely praised. GameSpot remarked, "All of PaRappa's characters are comically animated paper dolls moving against colorful 3D backdrops, a simplistic and charming visual design that never would have worked but for the game's theme and some brilliant camera motion." Multiple critics also commented on the well-crafted story and charming title character. Next Generation summarized that "The game is so well-produced and carried out that you won't even notice that the gameplay itself is based on the most primitive of concepts. Simply put, style over substance has never been better done than in PaRappa." The one common criticism was that the game is too short.

At the inaugural Interactive Achievement Awards in 1998, PaRappa the Rapper won the awards for "Outstanding Achievement in Interactive Design" and "Outstanding Achievement in Sound and Music"; it also received a nomination for "Interactive Title of the Year". Electronic Gaming Monthly awarded it "Most Original Game of the Year" and "Best Music", and the character PaRappa "Best Mascot" (beating out Lara Croft and Crash Bandicoot, both of whom had critically acclaimed games released that year), at their 1997 Editors' Choice Awards. In the final issue of the Official UK PlayStation Magazine, the game was chosen as the 3rd best game of all time.

PaRappa the Rapper Remastered received mixed or average reviews. It was praised for keeping the charm of the original game while improving on the graphical quality but was criticized for only improving the graphics of the gameplay and not the cutscenes. Caitlin Cooke of Destructoid wrote that "The remastered version does not include a calibration setting. This works very much against PaRappa's favor as there's an extremely noticeable lag throughout each of the levels, causing havoc when trying to hit the notes on time." Stuart Andrews of Trusted Reviews wrote: "I love PaRappa and his 'I gotta believe' attitude, but this early rhythm action game no longer holds up."

In 1999, Next Generation listed PaRappa the Rapper as number 36 on their "Top 50 Games of All Time", commenting that "PaRappa has to be played to truly understand how wonderful it is, and it appeals to both young and old, men and women, hardcore gamers and people who have never held a controller before in their lives."

== Legacy ==
PaRappa the Rapper is considered the first true rhythm game. It was influential in setting the basic template for subsequent titles in the rhythm game genre, including successful franchises such as Konami's Bemani games (including Beatmania, Dance Dance Revolution and GuitarFreaks), Sega's Samba de Amigo, Harmonix games (including Guitar Hero and Rock Band), and Ubisoft's Just Dance.

=== Franchise ===
PaRappa the Rapper was followed by a spin-off titled Um Jammer Lammy, which was released on 18 March 1999 in Japan. The game featured a new cast of characters, multiplayer modes and focused on guitar play, but very similar gameplay. A bonus mode was included in which the entire game could be replayed with PaRappa as the protagonist, complete with his own versions of the game's stages. An arcade version of the game produced by Namco was also released. A direct sequel, PaRappa the Rapper 2, was released for the PlayStation 2 in 2001 in Japan and 2002 in North America and Europe. Several media adaptations outside of the video game industry were also developed, including an eponymous anime television series which aired in Japan between April 2001 and January 2002, which served as a tie-in to PaRappa the Rapper 2.

=== Ports ===
PaRappa the Rapper was released for PlayStation Portable in Japan in December 2006 and in North America and Europe in July 2007 for the game's tenth anniversary. The port, developed by Japan Studio and epics, features ad hoc multiplayer mode for up to four players and the ability to download remixed versions of the existing songs. In conjunction with the PSP release, Sony, for a limited time, freely released the soundtrack. In a 2008 Famitsu interview, Masaya Matsuura revealed that a brand new song created for the PSP release, "Believe in Yourself", was cut due to development time constraints.

A remaster of the game by Japan Studio for PlayStation 4 was released on 4 April 2017. The port features graphics of up to 4K resolution, and includes all the downloadable songs from the PSP version. A playable demo was released on 3 December 2016, celebrating the game's 20th anniversary. Homebrew developers found that the PS4 port was actually the PlayStation Portable version running inside an emulator and with high resolution textures.

In 2016, Sony's mobile studio ForwardWorks announced they were working on a version of the game for smartphones; no further details have been released since then.

=== In popular culture ===
PaRappa the Rapper was featured as a challenge on the video game-based show GamesMaster in 1997. The game was also referenced in the web series Video Game High School, where the character Jenny Matrix is pressured into playing a level of "PAROPERA THE OPERA" during a talk show.

On 1 July 2003, Parappa and Chop Chop Master Onion starred in a series of Japanese TV commercials with pop icon Gackt. This collaboration between Sony Music Entertainment Japan and Dwango Co. promoted downloadable ringtones and voice clips of Parappa and Gackt, along with "Parappa the Rapper Mobile", a mobile adaptation designed to replicate the gameplay experience of the original PlayStation version.

On January 5th, 2026, American rapper ASAP Rocky released the lead single to his fourth studio album, Don't Be Dumb, "Punk Rocky" with its artwork being inspired by Parappa.

On August 14, 2026, YouTuber anothermartz posted a parody video depicting Nigel Farage celebrating his by-election victory in Clacton seated alongside Parappa.
