= Rodney Alan Greenblat =

American artist (born 1960)

- Born: August 23, 1960 (age 66); Daly City, California
- Education: Corcoran School of Art (1978); School of Visual Arts (1978–1982)
- Known for: Illustration; fine art
- Notable work: Art and character design for the PaRappa the Rapper franchise
- Movement: Neo-Surrealist
- Website: whimsyload.com

Rodney Alan Greenblat (born August 23, 1960) is an American artist, graphic designer and children's book author born in Daly City, California. He is a former director of the Center for Advanced Whimsy, is responsible for the character design of several video games, including the PaRappa the Rapper series, and was an active figure in the East Village art scene of the 1980s.

== Work ==
Greenblat's work was shown in East Village museums in the 1980s, including the Gracie Mansion Gallery, and was at the time considered part of a neo-surrealist movement. Within the same decade, he did the artwork for American alternative rock band They Might Be Giants' first album.

He has been recognized for his work on the 1996 and 1999 video games PaRappa the Rapper and Um Jammer Lammy, and for the Thunder Bunny series of books.

In 2009, he designed characters for the Japanese transportation smart card SUGOCA, sold by JR Kyushu.

In 2017, he opened The Rodney Shop, a retail outlet and gallery in Catskill, New York. The location closed in 2020.

== Computer and video games ==
- Rodney's Funscreen (Published by Activision, 1992, PC/Mac)
- Rodney's Wonder Window (Published by Voyager, 1992, PC/Mac)
- Dazzleoids (Published by Voyager, 1994, PC/Mac)
- PaRappa the Rapper (Published by Sony, 1996, PS1)
- Rodney's Funscreen 2 extreme (Published by Interlink, 1997, PC/Mac)
- Rodney's Artbrain (Published by Interlink, 1997, PC/Mac)
- Um Jammer Lammy (Published by Sony, 1999, PS1)
- PaRappa the Rapper 2 (Published by Sony, 2001, PS2)
- Major Minor's Majestic March (Published by Majesco, 2009, Wii)

== Solo exhibition history ==
1982

- The Threshold, Rodney Alan Greenblat. Museum of Art, Rhode Island School of Design, Providence, Rhode Island

1983

- Gracie Mansion Gallery, New York, New York

1984

- Time of Love. Galerie Anna Friebe, Cologne, Germany

1985

- The New World. Gracie Mansion Gallery, New York, New York
- Suburban Utopias/Familiar Frontiers. Australian Centre for Contemporary Art, Melbourne, Victoria, Australia

1986

- House of Progress. Gracie Mansion Gallery, New York, New York
- The Tricentennial Room. Karl Bornstein Gallery, Los Angeles, California

1987

- Reality and Imagination; Two Taste Treats in One! Institute of Contemporary Art, Philadelphia, Pennsylvania
- Reality and Imagination; Two Taste Treats in One! Contemporary Arts Museum, Houston, Texas
- The Scenic Route. Gracie Mansion Gallery, New York, New York

1988

- Design Your Own Future. Walker Art Center, Minneapolis, Minnesota

1989

- John Berggruen Gallery, San Francisco, California

1990

- Cosmic Adhesive. Gracie Mansion Gallery, New York, New York

1991

- The Center for Advanced Whimsy. Carpenter Arts Center, Harvard University, Cambridge, Massachusetts

1992

- Land Ho! The Mythic World of Rodney A. Greenblat. Museum of Art, Roanoke, Virginia
- Land Ho! The Mythic World of Rodney A. Greenblat. Chrysler Museum, Norfolk, Virginia

1993

- Technoweenie. PPOW, New York, New York
- Land Ho! The Mythic World of Rodney A. Greenblat. World Financial Center, New York, New York

1995

- Rodney Time. Creation Gallery G8, Ginza, Tokyo, Japan

1996

- Rodney's Late Breakfast at Milk. Milk, Ebisu, Tokyo, Japan

1997

- Rodney Adventure. Discovery Museum, Bridgeport, Connecticut

1998

- New Studio Rodney. Parco Department Store, Japan

1999

- Rodney's Art in a Box. Sony Plaza, Tokyo and Osaka, Japan

2000

- Rodney's Character Club and Post Office Parco Department Store, Tokyo and Osaka, Japan
- Cafe Rodney. Tokyo, Japan

2001

- Canworld Expo. Takashimaya Department Store, Osaka, Japan

2005

- Modern Day. BCB Gallery, Hudson, New York

2006

- Downtown – The New York Art Scene 1974–1984. Grey Art Gallery NYU, New York, New York
- Universe. Centella Gallery, Tucson, Arizona

2007

- Elemental. Art Print Japan Galleries, Tokyo, Japan

2008

- Free Wheel. BCB Gallery, Hudson, New York

2010

- Thunder Bunny Buddha Shrine. BCB Gallery, Hudson, New York

2012

- Karma-con. The Rubin Museum, New York, New York

2013

- Gala Veinte!. Hudson Opera House, Hudson, New York
- The Wonder Verified and Fulfilled. BCB Gallery, Hudson, NY

2015

- Vibrant Space. BCB Gallery, Hudson, New York
