= List of Doraemon (2005 TV series) episodes (2015–2024) =

The following is a list of episodes of the anime television series Doraemon (2005 anime).

== Series overview ==
Year	Episodes	Originally released	
Year	Episodes	First released	Last released
2005	32	April 15, 2005	December 31, 2005
2006	42	January 13, 2006	December 31, 2006
2007	36	January 12, 2007	December 31, 2007
2008	44	January 11, 2008	December 31, 2008
2009	42	January 9, 2009	December 31, 2009
2010	38	January 8, 2010	December 17, 2010
2011	43	January 3, 2011	December 16, 2011
2012	40	January 6, 2012	December 31, 2012
2013	35	January 11, 2013	December 30, 2013
2014	35	January 17, 2014	December 30, 2014
2015	39	January 9, 2015	December 31, 2015
2016	41	January 15, 2016	December 31, 2016
2017	38	January 13, 2017	December 31, 2017
2018	42	January 7, 2018	December 31, 2018
2019	37	January 18, 2019	December 28, 2019
2020	52	January 11, 2020	December 31, 2020
2021	51	January 9, 2021	December 31, 2021
2022	52	January 8, 2022	December 31, 2022
2023	48	January 7, 2023	December 31, 2023
2024	47	January 6, 2024	December 28, 2024
2025	49	January 11, 2025	December 27, 2025
2026	TBA	January 10, 2026	TBA

== 2015 ==
No.	Title	Original release date
664	"The Whole Town is Putty in My Hands"; Transliteration: "Machinaka gunyagunyanendoron" (Japanese: 町中グニャグニャネンドロン)	January 9, 2015
665	"Let's Turn Into the Snow Woman on Cold Days!"; Transliteration: "Samui hi wa yukion'na ni narou!" (Japanese: 寒い日は雪女になろう!)	January 9, 2015
666	"Protect the World in Our Secret Headquarters!"; Transliteration: "Himitsu kichi de sekai o mamore!" (Japanese: 秘密基地で世界を守れ！)	January 23, 2015
667	"Four-Dimensional Cycling"; Transliteration: "Shi-jigen saikuringu" (Japanese: 四次元サイクリング)	January 23, 2015
668	"Dinosaur Hunter"; Transliteration: "Kyōryū hatā" (Japanese: 恐竜ハンター)	February 6, 2015
669	"Making Mochi and Doing Sumo Wrestling for Valentine's"; Transliteration: "Bareintan ni hao mochi to sumō o" (Japanese: バレインタンにはおモチとすもうを)	February 13, 2015
670	"Shizuka-chan and the Mini Garden Ski Slope"; Transliteration: "Shizukachan to hako niwa sukī-ba" (Japanese: しずかちゃんと はこ庭スキー場)	February 13, 2015
671	"Someone Even Richer than Suneo Showed Up"; Transliteration: "Suneotto yori kanemochi ga yattekita" (Japanese: スネ夫より金持ちがやってきた)	February 20, 2015
672	"Pet-Mimicking Manjuu"; Transliteration: "Petto sokkuri manjū" (Japanese: ペットそっくりまんじゅう)	February 20, 2015
673	"The Invincible Super Backpack"; Transliteration: "Muteki no sū pārandose ru" (Japanese: 無敵のスーパーランドセル)	February 27, 2015
674	"Hop Inside the Clam Pack!"; Transliteration: "Mogure! Hamaguripakku" (Japanese: もぐれ!ハマグリパック)	February 27, 2015
-	"Doraemon: New Nobita's Great Demon—Peko and the Exploration Party of Five"	March 6, 2015
675	"Nobita's Cardboard Space Station"; Transliteration: "Nobita no danbōru uchū sutēshon" (Japanese: のび太のダンボール宇宙ステーション)	March 13, 2015
676	"Let's Punish Gian for Snatching Our Stuff"; Transliteration: "Yokodori jaian o korashimeyou" (Japanese: 横取りジャイアンをこらしめよう)	March 20, 2015
677	"Let's Move All Over the Place"; Transliteration: "Achikochi hikkosou" (Japanese: あちこちひっこそう)	March 20, 2015
678	"The Love-Love Parasol"; Transliteration: "Aiai parasoru" (Japanese: あいあいパラソル)	April 10, 2015
679	"Find the Culprit with the Time Machine"; Transliteration: "Taimu mashin de han'nin o" (Japanese: タイムマシンで犯人を)	April 10, 2015
680	Transliteration: "Mushakushataimā" (Japanese: ムシャクシャタイマー)	April 10, 2015
681	"Parting the Waters with a Stick"; Transliteration: "Sutekki de kawa o mapputatsu" (Japanese: ステッキで川をまっぷたつ)	April 17, 2015
682	"Revenge Voucher"; Transliteration: "Shika eshi denpyō" (Japanese: しかえし伝票)	April 17, 2015
683	"Take a Sea Voyage on a Dolphin"; Transliteration: "Iruka ni notte uminotabi" (Japanese: イルカにのって海の旅)	April 24, 2015
684	"The Sympathy Robot"; Transliteration: "Itawari robotto" (Japanese: いたわりロボット)	April 24, 2015
685	"Gian Came Flying In"; Transliteration: "Jaian ga tonde kita" (Japanese: ジャイアンが飛んできた)	May 1, 2015
686	"The Forgetting Flower"; Transliteration: "Wasurero Gurasu" (Japanese: わすれろ草)	May 1, 2015
687	"Our Big Air Battle"; Transliteration: "Boku-ra no dai kūchū-sen" (Japanese: ぼくらの大空中戦)	May 8, 2015
688	"Nikmenine"; Transliteration: "Nikumenain" (Japanese: ニクメナイン)	May 8, 2015
689	"Nobi's Residence is at the 30th Floor"; Transliteration: "Nobi-ka wa san jū-kai" (Japanese: 野比家は三十階)	May 15, 2015
690	"Runaway! Gift Tree"; Transliteration: "Bōsō! Purezento no ki" (Japanese: 暴走!プレゼントの木)	May 15, 2015
691	"The Water I Had Seen"; Transliteration: "Mizu wa mite ita" (Japanese: 水はみていた)	May 15, 2015
692	"Lucky Kettle"; Transliteration: "Rakkī yakan" (Japanese: ラッキーやかん)	May 22, 2015
693	"Everything is Doll.."; Transliteration: "Nan demo nuigurumi ni…" (Japanese: なんでもぬいぐるみに…)	May 22, 2015
694	"I want to be an Adult"; Transliteration: "Otonaninaritai" (Japanese: 大人になりたい)	May 22, 2015
695	"Something is Gonna Occur by 7 o'clock" Transliteration: "Shichiji ni nanika ga okoru" (Japanese: 七時に何かがおこる)	May 29, 2015
696	"The Jack in the Box Stick"; Transliteration: "Bikkuribakosutekki" (Japanese: びっくり箱ステッキ)	May 29, 2015
697	"Someone Who's an Even Bigger Failure in Life Than Me Showed Up"; Transliteration: "Bokuyoridamenayatsugakita" (Japanese: ぼくよりダメなやつがきた)	May 29, 2015
698	"The Parlor Aquarium"; Transliteration: "O zashiki suizokukan" (Japanese: おざしき水族館)	June 5, 2015
699	"Oda Chimpenzee"; Transliteration: "Odachinpanjī" (Japanese: オダチンパンジー)	June 5, 2015
700	"Nobita's Long Day"; Transliteration: "Nobita no nagai tsuitachi" (Japanese: のび太の長い一日)	June 5, 2015
701	"Look at it! Fault Vision"; Transliteration: "Marumie! Dansō bijon" (Japanese: まる見え!断層ビジョン)	June 12, 2015
702	"Strike! Nobita's Gurumeri Photo"; Transliteration: "Totsuzen Geki! Nobita no gurumeripōto" (Japanese: 突げき!のび太のグルメリポート)	June 12, 2015
703	"It's That Time of the Year Again"; Transliteration: "Kotoshi mo ano Ni~Tsu ga yattekita!" (Japanese: 今年もあの日がやってきた!)	June 12, 2015
704	"Take a Picture With a Hard Camera!"; Transliteration: "Boku o utsushite! Men kui kamera" (Japanese: ボクを写して!めんくいカメラ)	June 19, 2015
705	"Shiritori Nessin"; Transliteration: "Shiri toride nesshī ni" (Japanese: しりとりでネッシーに)	June 19, 2015
706	"Borrowing in the Shade"; Transliteration: "Kagegari" (Japanese: かげがり)	June 19, 2015
707	"The Cuts Expired a Human Sea"; Transliteration: "Umi o hito kire kiritotte" (Japanese: 海をひときれ切りとって)	June 26, 2015
708	"After That, Leave It to Me and Touch the Gloves"; Transliteration: "Ato wa omakase tatchitebukuro" (Japanese: あとはおまかせタッチてぶくろ)	June 26, 2015
709	"A Three-day Meal With Nobita's Flat Stomach"; Transliteration: "Hara peko Nobita no 3-kakan" (Japanese: あとはおまかせタッチてぶくろ)	June 26, 2015
710	"Slow-Slow, Quick-Quick"; Transliteration: "Noronoro, jitabata" (Japanese: のろのろ、じたばた)	July 10, 2015
711	"A Watermelon Pen"; Transliteration: "Suika-wari ni suikapen" (Japanese: スイカ割りにスイカペン)	July 10, 2015
712	"The Soul Machine"; Transliteration: "Tamashiimu mashin" (Japanese: タマシイム・マシン)	July 10, 2015
713	"The Debut of the Mood-Changing Orchestra!"; Transliteration: "Mūdo mori age gakudan" (Japanese: ムードも りあげ楽団)	July 24, 2015
714	"Easy Barbecue Set is Not Easy"; Transliteration: "Rakuraku bā be kyūsetto wa raku janai" (Japanese: 楽々バー べキューセッ トはラク じゃない)	July 24, 2015
715	"The Great Adventure in the South Seas ~Captain Silver's Treasure~"; Transliteration: "Nankai no dai bōken ~ kyaputen shirubā nozaihō ~" (Japanese: 南海の大冒険～キャプテン・シ ルバーの財宝～)	July 24, 2015
716	"If Nobita Cries, It Will Rain"; Transliteration: "Nobita ga nakeba ame ga furu" (Japanese: のび太が泣けば雨がふる)	July 31, 2015
717	"The Origami Jungle Expedition"; Transliteration: "Janguru tanken ni haori-shi o" (Japanese: ジャングル探検にはおり紙を)	July 31, 2015
718	"Chilly! Ghost Incense!"; Transliteration: "Zokuzoku! Obake senkō" (Japanese: ゾクゾク!おばけ線香)	August 21, 2015
719	"Rumor Flower Bloomed!"; Transliteration: "Uwasa hana shi ga sai chatta!" (Japanese: うわさ花しが咲いちゃった!)	August 21, 2015
720	"Gian's Gratitude"; Transliteration: "Jaian no ongaeshi" (Japanese: ジャイアンの恩返し)	August 28, 2015
721	"Let's Build the South Island"; Transliteration: "Minami no shima o kumitateyou" (Japanese: 南の島を組み立てよう)	August 28, 2015
722	"Nobita Express and the Mystery of the Train Hunter"; Transliteration: "Nobita tokkyū to nazo no toreinhantā" (Japanese: のび太特急と謎のトレインハンター)	September 4, 2015
723	"Sell the Night"; Transliteration: "Yoru o urimasu" (Japanese: 夜を売ります)	September 11, 2015
724	"The Rabbit Monster in the Mountain"; Transliteration: "Ura yama no usagi kaijū (kaiji ~yu u)" (Japanese: うら山のウサギ怪獣 （かいじゅう）)	September 11, 2015
725	"Brilliant! Nobi the Feudal Lord"; Transliteration: "Appare! Nobi tonosama" (Japanese: アッパレ ！ のび 殿さま)	October 9, 2015
726	"Insect's Recital of the Autumn"; Transliteration: "Aki no mushi no risaitaru" (Japanese: 秋の虫のリサイタル)	October 9, 2015
727	"Make It Clean with Sinking Ball"; Transliteration: "Shizume-dama de sukkiri" (Japanese: しずめ玉でスッキリ)	October 16, 2015
728	"Nobita's Treasure Evaluation"; Transliteration: "Nobita no otakara kantei" (Japanese: のび太のお宝鑑定)	October 16, 2015
729	"Halloween and Nobi the Frog"; Transliteration: "Harō~in to nobi-gaeru" (Japanese: ハロウィンとのびガエル)	October 23, 2015
730	"The Birth of the Cartoonist Christine-sensei"; Transliteration: "Tanjō! Manga-ka risuchīne sensei" (Japanese: 誕生!まんが家クリスチーネ先生)	October 23, 2015
731	"The Flying Santa has Come!"; Transliteration: "Soratobu sanma ga yattekita" (Japanese: 空飛ぶサンマがやってきた)	October 30, 2015
732	"The Story of the Old Persimmons"; Transliteration: "Mukashi no kaki no monogatari" (Japanese: 昔のカキの物語)	October 30, 2015
733	"Mountain! River! Anyplace Shoe"; Transliteration: "Yama e! Sora e! Nori mo no gutsu" (Japanese: 山へ！空へ ！ 乗りものぐつ)	November 6, 2015
734	"Mama is Still in Elementary School"; Transliteration: "Mama, shōgakusei ni naru" (Japanese: ママ、小学生になる)	November 6, 2015
735	"I Want to Eat the Matsutake!"; Transliteration: "Matsutake tabetai" (Japanese: マツタケ食べたい)	November 13, 2015
736	"The Saio Horse is Kicking Me!"; Transliteration: "Boku o kette! Saiō-ba" (Japanese: ボクをけって！サイオー馬)	November 13, 2015
737	"The Real Crayon"; Transliteration: "Hon mono kureyon" (Japanese: ほんものクレヨン)	November 20, 2015
738	"The Wind Bag and the Snake Oil"; Transliteration: "Kaze bu kuro to inchikigusuri" (Japanese: かぜぶくろといんちき薬)	November 20, 2015
739	"Nobi the Thief is Somewhat Arrested!"; Transliteration: "Nobi dorobō o taiho seyo" (Japanese: のび泥棒をタイホせよ)	November 27, 2015
740	"Make That Girl Laugh!"; Transliteration: "Ano ko o warawasero!" (Japanese: あの子を笑わせろ !)	November 27, 2015
741	"Gian's Unstoppable Song"; Transliteration: "Jaian no uta ga yame rarenai" (Japanese: ジャイアンの歌がやめられない)	December 4, 2015
742	"Pizza Dumplings Shining in the Night Sky"; Transliteration: "Yozora ni kagayaku piza gyōza" (Japanese: 夜空に輝くピザ・ギョーザ)	December 4, 2015
743	"Escape the Giant Christmas Cake!!"; Transliteration: "Dasshutsu! ! Kyodai kurisumasukēki" (Japanese: 脱出!!巨大クリスマスケーキ)	December 11, 2015
744	"If You Skate in Ice Age"; Transliteration: "Sukēto surunara hyōgaki de" (Japanese: スケートするなら氷河期で)	December 11, 2015
745	"Sell Dry Light for the First Time"; Transliteration: "Hatsu uri dorai raito" (Japanese: 初売りドライ・ライト)	December 31, 2015
746	"From Memory Bread to Hyakunin"; Transliteration: "Hyakunin'isshu ni ankipan" (Japanese: 百人一首にアンキパン)	December 31, 2015
747	"Rebuild the Battered Inn"; Transliteration: "Onboro ryokan o tate naose" (Japanese: オンボロ旅館をたて直せ)	December 31, 2015
748	"The Snow is Hot! The Air Conditioning Photo"; Transliteration: "Yuki demo pokapoka! Eakon foto" (Japanese: 雪でもポカポカ! エアコンフォト)	December 31, 2015

== 2016 ==
No.	Title	Original release date
749	"The Dora Dora Genpei Battle ~Save Yourself Shizuka-chan!~"; Transliteration: "Doradora genpeigassen 〜 shizukachan gozen o sukue!〜" (Japanese: ドラドラ源平合戦〜しずかちゃん御前を救え！〜)	January 15, 2016
750	"Big Collection of Look-alike Pet"; Transliteration: "Sokkuri petto dai shūgō" (Japanese: そっくりペット大集合)	January 22, 2016
751	"Reunion! Nobita from 5 Years Ago"; Transliteration: "Saikai! Go-nen-buri no Nobita" (Japanese: 再会！5年ぶりののび太)	January 22, 2016
752	"The Dora Dora Space-time Adventure: The Mystery of Nobita's Figurines"; Transliteration: "Doradora jikū adobenchā Nobita dogū no nazo" (Japanese: ドラドラ時空アドベンチャーのび太土偶の謎)	January 29, 2016
753	"The No Room Door"; Transliteration: "Naiheyadoa" (Japanese: ナイヘヤドア)	January 29, 2016
754	"I'm Mari-chan"; Transliteration: "Boku, Mari-chan" (Japanese: ぼく、マリちゃんだよ)	February 5, 2016
755	"The Shifting Stick"; Transliteration: "Zurashin bo" (Japanese: ずらしんぼ)	February 5, 2016
756	"Love!? The Transformation Biscuits"; Transliteration: "Koisuru! ? Henshin bisuketto" (Japanese: 恋する!?変身ビスケット)	February 12, 2016
757	"The Act Predictor Lens"; Transliteration: "Suru koto renzu" (Japanese: することレンズ)	February 12, 2016
758	"The Any Substance Conversion Machine"; Transliteration: "Nan demo zaishitsuhenkanki" (Japanese: なんでも材質変換機)	February 19, 2016
759	"The Snowman Won't Forget"; Transliteration: "Yukidaruma wa wasurenai" (Japanese: 雪だるま は忘れない)	February 19, 2016
760	"Nobita is an Annoying Hotpot Governor"; Transliteration: "Nobita wa urusai nabe bugyō" (Japanese: のび太はうるさいナベ奉行)	February 26, 2016
761	"The Machine for Getting Off the Earth"; Transliteration: "Chikyū gesha mashin" (Japanese: 地球下車マシン)	February 26, 2016
-	"Doraemon: Nobita's Space Heroes"	March 4, 2016
762	"The Fantasy Animal Safari Park and the Promised Flute"; Transliteration: "Kūsō dōbutsu safaripāku to yakusoku no fue" (Japanese: 空想動物サファリパークと約束の笛)	March 11, 2016
763	"The Space Exploration Sugoroku"; Transliteration: "Uchūtankensugoroku" (Japanese: 宇宙探検すごろく)	April 1, 2016
764	"The Strongest! The Almighty Pass"; Transliteration: "Saikyō! Ō rumaitīpasu" (Japanese: 最強！オー ルマイティーパス)	April 1, 2016
765	"Your Chopsticks will Stretch, Everywhere"; Transliteration: "O hashi wa nobiru yo, doko made mo" (Japanese: お箸はのびるよ、どこまでも)	April 15, 2016
766	"The Dust Collecting Machine"; Transliteration: "Chiri tsumoraseki" (Japanese: チリつもらせ機)	April 15, 2016
767	"Nobita's Jack and the Beanstalk"; Transliteration: "Nobita no jakkutomamenoki" (Japanese: のび太のジャックと豆の木)	April 22, 2016
768	"The Popular Guise Badge"; Transliteration: "Misekake motemotebajji" (Japanese: みせかけモテモテバッジ)	April 22, 2016
769	"Flying Sky Carpet"; Transliteration: "Soratobu usu-te no jūta" (Japanese: 空飛ぶうす手のじゅうたん)	April 29, 2016
770	"Rumor is Saki Bird"; Transliteration: "Uwasa o Saki tori" (Japanese: うわさをサキ鳥)	April 29, 2016
771	"The Friends are Big Dolphins?"; Transliteration: "Tomodachi wa ōkina iruka?" (Japanese: 友だちは大きなイルカ？)	May 6, 2016
772	"The Dream Ladder"; Transliteration: "Yume hashigo" (Japanese: 夢はしご)	May 6, 2016
773	"The Manual Maker"; Transliteration: "Torisetsu mēkā" (Japanese: トリセツ・メーカー)	May 13, 2016
774	"The Ragged Detective Nobita"; Transliteration: "Zō kin tantei Nobita" (Japanese: ぞうきん探偵のび太)	May 13, 2016
775	"The NS Badge in Sports Day"; Transliteration: "N S wappen de undōkai" (Japanese: N・ Sワッペン で運動会)	May 20, 2016
776	"The Pearl Producing Oyster Case"; Transliteration: "Shinji ~yu seizō akoyakēsu" (Japanese: しんじゅ製造アコヤケース)	May 20, 2016
777	"Let's Set Up the Customer's Face"; Transliteration: "Okyaku no kao o kumitateyou" (Japanese: お客の顔を組み立てよう)	May 27, 2016
778	"Mama asked for Three Thousand Kilometers"; Transliteration: "Mamawotazunetesanzenkirojō" (Japanese: ママをたずねて三千キロじょう)	May 27, 2016
779	"The Esper Hat"; Transliteration: "Esupā bōshi" (Japanese: エスパーぼうし)	June 3, 2016
780	"The Story of a Cute Umbrella"; Transliteration: "Kawaī amagasa no monogatari" (Japanese: かわいい雨傘の物語)	June 3, 2016
781	"Wilderness in the Room"; Transliteration: "Heya no naka no dai shizen" (Japanese: へやの中の大自然)	June 10, 2016
782	"The Joining Incense"; Transliteration: "Nakamai risenkō" (Japanese: なかまい りせんこう)	June 10, 2016
783	"The Appearance of a Giant"; Transliteration: "Ōotoko ga deta zo" (Japanese: 大男がでたぞ)	June 17, 2016
784	"Your Eyes Have One Million Volts"; Transliteration: "Kimi no hitomi wa 100 man boruto" (Japanese: キミのひとみは100万ボルト)	June 17, 2016
785	"You Can't Do That! Prohibition Sign"; Transliteration: "Damedame! Kinshihyōshiki" (Japanese: ダメダメ！キンシひょうしき)	June 24, 2016
786	"My Guardian Paper"; Transliteration: "Boku no mamori-shi" (Japanese: ぼくのまもり紙)	June 24, 2016
787	"Let's go to The Dinosaur Tour!"; Transliteration: "Kyōryū tsuā ni ikou!" (Japanese: 恐竜ツアーに行こう！)	July 8, 2016
788	"The Snooze Sticker"; Transliteration: "I nemuri shīru" (Japanese: いねむりシール)	July 8, 2016
789	"3cm Nobita's Adventures"; Transliteration: "3Senchi Nobita no dai bōken" (Japanese: ３センチのび太の大冒険)	July 22, 2016
790	"Home's Pacific Ocean Pool"; Transliteration: "Uchi no pūru wa Taiheiyō" (Japanese: うちのプールは太平洋)	July 29, 2016
791	"Recycling with Ghosts"; Transliteration: "Obake de risaikuru" (Japanese: おばけでリサイクル)	July 29, 2016
792	"Substitution on Television to the South Island"; Transliteration: "Migawariterebi de minami no shima e" (Japanese: 身代わりテレビで南の島へ)	August 5, 2016
793	"Catch the Wind"; Transliteration: "Kaze o ayatsure! Bashō ōgi" (Japanese: 風をあやつれ！バショー扇)	August 5, 2016
794	"Punish in Punishment"; Transliteration: "Dajare de yattsukero!" (Japanese: ダジャレでやっつけろ！)	August 12, 2016
795	"The Water Slide Behind the Hill"; Transliteration: "Urayama u~ōtāsuraidā" (Japanese: 裏山ウォータースライダー)	August 12, 2016
796	"The Puddles' Mysterious Fish"; Transliteration: "Mizutamari no kai sakana" (Japanese: 水たまりの怪魚)	August 19, 2016
797	"The Alien's House"; Transliteration: "Uchūbito no yakata" (Japanese: 宇宙人の館)	August 19, 2016
798	"The Prank Toy Machine"; Transliteration: "Itazuraomochakaki" (Japanese: いたずらオモチャ化機)	August 26, 2016
799	"Make a Character Change with a Seal"; Transliteration: "Shīru de kyara henshin" (Japanese: シールでキャラ変身)	August 26, 2016
800	"The Genius Nobita's Airship Amusement Park"; Transliteration: "Tensai Nobita no hikōsen yū en chi" (Japanese: 天才のび太の飛行船ゆうえんち)	September 2, 2016
801	"Biography Biography Electric"; Transliteration: "Tobidasu denki denki" (Japanese: とびだす伝記電気)	September 9, 2016
802	"Wanted Person Finder"; Transliteration: "Hoshī hito tanchi-ki" (Japanese: ほしい人探知機)	September 9, 2016
803	"Shizuka-chan Became the Elephant's Nose"; Transliteration: "Zō no hana ni natta shizukachan" (Japanese: ゾウの鼻になったしずかちゃん)	September 16, 2016
804	"Exchange Room Switch"; Transliteration: "heyakōkansuitchi" (Japanese: へやこうかんスイッチ)	September 16, 2016
805	"Zakuzaku! Hunting Fruit in the Ground"; Transliteration: "Zakuzaku! Chichū de kudamono kari" (Japanese: ざくざく！地中でくだもの狩り)	October 14, 2016
806	"Barrier Point"; Transliteration: "Bariyā pointo" (Japanese: バリヤーポイント)	October 14, 2016
807	"Fly Away Gian!"; Transliteration: "Peraperajaian tonde tta!" (Japanese: ペラペラジャイアン飛んでった！)	October 21, 2016
808	"Invisible Bodyguard"; Transliteration: "Mienai bodigādo" (Japanese: みえないボディガード)	October 21, 2016
809	"Pandora's Ghost"; Transliteration: "Pandora no obake" (Japanese: パンドラのおばけ)	October 28, 2016
810	"First Antenna"; Transliteration: "Arakajime antena" (Japanese: あらかじめアンテナ)	October 28, 2016
811	"Magnify Bad Habits Gas"; Transliteration: "Kusenaoshigasu" (Japanese: くせなおしガス)	November 4, 2016
812	"Hot Blooded! Dodgeball"; Transliteration: "Nekketsu! Dojjibō ru" (Japanese: 熱血！ドッジボール)	November 4, 2016
813	"Wrapper Cab"; Transliteration: "Furoshiki takushī" (Japanese: ふろしきタクシー)	November 18, 2016
814	"Anytime Anywhere Sketch Set"; Transliteration: "Itsu demo doko demo suketchisetto" (Japanese: いつでもどこでもスケッチセット)	November 18, 2016
815	"Rocket Control Training Machine"; Transliteration: "Roketto sōjūkunrenki" (Japanese: ロケットそうじゅうくんれん機)	November 25, 2016
816	"The Best Fan Letter for Gian"; Transliteration: "Jaian e no hottona retā" (Japanese: ジャイアンへのホットなレター)	November 25, 2016
817	"Super Hero Wrapping Cloth"; Transliteration: "Sūpāhīrō furoshiki" (Japanese: スーパーヒーローふろしき)	December 2, 2016
818	"Cuckoo Egg"; Transliteration: "Kakkōtamago" (Japanese: カッコータマゴ)	December 2, 2016
819	"Save the Antarctic Penguin!"; Transliteration: "Nankyoku pengin o sukue!" (Japanese: 南極ペンギンを救え！)	December 9, 2016
820	"Day Changing Calendar"; Transliteration: "Hi dzuke henkō karendā" (Japanese: 日づけ変更カレンダー)	December 9, 2016
821	"Snow at Christmas"; Transliteration: "Kurisumasu ni yuki o" (Japanese: クリスマスに雪を)	December 16, 2016
822	"Watch Out for the Challenging Phase!"; Transliteration: "Chū-nan no sō ni kiwotsukero!" (Japanese: チュー難の相に気をつけろ!)	December 16, 2016
823	"Do your Best, Sengoku Rider Nobibe"; Transliteration: "Sengoku nobi Hyōe ganbare" (Japanese: 戦国のび兵衛がんばれ)	December 31, 2016
-	"Doraemon and Perman's Close Call"; Transliteration: "Doraemon& pāman kikiippatsu! ?" (Japanese: ドラえもん＆パーマン危機一髪 !?)	December 31, 2016
824	"The Secret Love Life of Sumire Hoshino"; Transliteration: "Hoshino Sumire no himitsu no koi" (Japanese: 星野スミレのひみつの恋)	December 31, 2016

== 2017 ==
No.	Title	Original release date
825	"Earth Elevator"; Transliteration: "Chikyū erebētā" (Japanese: 地球エレベーター)	January 13, 2017
826	"Pair Finding Leash"; Transliteration: "Katappo tanchi rīdo" (Japanese: かたっぽ探知リード)	January 13, 2017
827	"Piihyoro Rope"; Transliteration: "Pīhyoro rō pu" (Japanese: ピーヒョロ ロープ)	January 20, 2017
828	"Brotherly Seal"; Transliteration: "Kyōdai shīru" (Japanese: 兄弟シール)	January 20, 2017
829	"Tarzan Underwear"; Transliteration: "Tāzanpantsu" (Japanese: ターザンパンツ)	January 27, 2017
830	"Tracing With the Tracer Badge"; Transliteration: "Tsuiseki! Torēsābajji" (Japanese: 追跡！トレーサーバッジ)	January 27, 2017
831	"Small-size Nobita faces the Demon"; Transliteration: "Issun Nobita no oni taiji" (Japanese: 一寸のび太の鬼たいじ)	February 3, 2017
832	"Doctor Bag"; Transliteration: "Oishasan kaban" (Japanese: お医者さんカバン)	February 3, 2017
833	"Hearted Chocolate"; Transliteration: "Kokoro choko" (Japanese: ココロチョコ)	February 10, 2017
834	"Nobita Country Declares Independence"; Transliteration: "Dokuritsu! Nobita kuni" (Japanese: 独立！のび太国)	February 10, 2017
835	"Thrilling Boomerang"; Transliteration: "Surirubūmeran" (Japanese: スリルブーメラン)	February 17, 2017
836	"Prophecy: The End of the Earth"; Transliteration: "dai yogen chikyū no horobiru hi" (Japanese: 大予言・地球の滅びる日)	February 17, 2017
837	"The Snow and The Dinosaur"; Transliteration: "Yuki to kyoryū" (Japanese: 雪と恐竜)	February 24, 2017
838	"To Miss Yumeko Nijitani"; Transliteration: "Hakei, nijitani yumekosan" (Japanese: 拝啓、虹谷ユメ子さん)	February 24, 2017
-	"Doraemon: Nobita and the Birth of Japan 2016"	March 3, 2017
839	"Paopao, The Lost Child"; Transliteration: "Maigo no PaoPao" (Japanese: 迷子のパオパオ)	March 17, 2017
840	"Doradora Ponpoko Major Investigation"; Transliteration: "Dora Dora Pon Pon Daisousa" (Japanese: ドラドラポンポコ大捜査)	April 7, 2017
841	"Animal Type Tablet"; Transliteration: "Doubutsu gata nigedashi jou" (Japanese: 動物型にげだし錠)	April 7, 2017
842	"Eating, Singing, and Bio Flower Gazing"; Transliteration: "Tabete utatte Baio hanami" (Japanese: 食べて歌ってバイオ花見)	April 7, 2017
843	"Welcome to the Castle of Haribote!"; Transliteration: "Yōkoso! Haribote no shiro e" (Japanese: ようこそ！ハリボテの城へ)	April 14, 2017
844	"The Mystery of the Ghost Mouth"; Transliteration: "Obake-guchi-me no kai" (Japanese: おばけ口目の怪)	April 14, 2017
845	"Reverse Invisibility Eye Drop"; Transliteration: "Mienaku naru me gusuri" (Japanese: 見えなくなる目ぐすり)	April 21, 2017
846	"You Can Eat With Your Mouth, as Well as Your Eyes"; Transliteration: "Me wa kuchi hodo ni mono o tabe" (Japanese: 目は口ほどに物を食べ)	April 21, 2017
847	"Martian Picnic"; Transliteration: "Kasei pikunikku" (Japanese: 火星ピクニック)	April 28, 2017
848	"Telepathy Fruit"; Transliteration: "Terepashī" (Japanese: テレパしい)	April 28, 2017
849	"Stop Mom From Running Away!"; Transliteration: "Mama o tsukamaero!" (Japanese: ママをつかまえろ！)	May 12, 2017
850	"Four Dimensional Dust Bin"; Transliteration: "Yojigenkuzukago" (Japanese: 四次元くずかご)	May 12, 2017
851	"Self Confidence Helmet"; Transliteration: "Jishin herumetto" (Japanese: 自信ヘルメット)	May 19, 2017
852	"Who is the Mask of Academic?"; Transliteration: "Gakkō kamen wa daredeshou?" (Japanese: ガッコー仮面は誰でしょう？)	May 19, 2017
853	"Nobita and the Queen of Ants"; Transliteration: "Nobita to Ari no joō" (Japanese: のび太とアリの女王)	May 26, 2017
854	"Memory Hammer"; Transliteration: "Wasure tonkachi" (Japanese: わすれとんかち)	June 2, 2017
855	"The Good Luck Pills"; Transliteration: "Ayakarin de kōun o" (Japanese: アヤカリンで幸運を)	June 2, 2017
856	"The Truth Stickers"; Transliteration: "Uraomotekkusu" (Japanese: ウラオモテックス)	June 9, 2017
857	"Slump! The New Song of Gian"; Transliteration: "Suranpu! Jaian ai no shinkyoku" (Japanese: スランプ！ジャイアン愛の新曲)	June 9, 2017
858	"Dad's a Runaway Runner"; Transliteration: "Bōsō ran'nāpapa" (Japanese: 暴走ランナーパパ)	June 16, 2017
859	"Karmala Egg"; Transliteration: "Karugamo eggu" (Japanese: カルガモエッグ)	June 16, 2017
860	"Comic Book's Extras from One Hundred Years Later"; Transliteration: "Momotose-go no furoku" (Japanese: 百年後のフロク)	June 23, 2017
861	"To Get Rose in a Good Mood"; Transliteration: "Togetorōzu wa gokigen'naname" (Japanese: トゲトローズはご機嫌ななめ)	June 23, 2017
862	"Masterpiece Theater Camera"; Transliteration: "20 Meisaku gekijō kamera" (Japanese: 名作劇場カメラ)	June 30, 2017
863	"The Sleeping Man's Pillow"; Transliteration: "San'nen'netarō makura" (Japanese: 三年寝太郎まくら)	June 30, 2017
864	"Room Swimmer"; Transliteration: "Rūmusuimā" (Japanese: ルームスイマー)	July 7, 2017
865	"A Late-night Town in the Bottom of the Sea"; Transliteration: "shin'ya no machi wa umi no soko" (Japanese: 深夜の町は海の底)	July 7, 2017
866	"I'm Mini Doraemon"; Transliteration: "Bokuminidoraemon" (Japanese: ぼくミニドラえもん)	July 28, 2017
867	"The Elephant and the Uncle"; Transliteration: "Zō to ojisan" (Japanese: ぞうとおじさん)	July 28, 2017
868	"Star Wars in My Attic"; Transliteration: "Tenjō ura no uchū sensō" (Japanese: 天井うらの宇宙戦争)	August 4, 2017
869	"Do your Best! Ghost House"; Transliteration: "Ganbare! Obake hausu" (Japanese: がんばれ！おばけハウス)	August 18, 2017
870	"Robinson Crusoe Set"; Transliteration: "Robinsonkurūsōsetto" (Japanese: ロビンソンクルーソーセット)	August 18, 2017
871	"Sweets Ranch"; Transliteration: "Okashi bokujō" (Japanese: おかし牧場)	August 25, 2017
872	"The Forest is Alive"; Transliteration: "Mori haikiteiru" (Japanese: 森は生きている)	August 25, 2017
873	"The Mystery of the Pyramids!? The Great Egyptian Adventure"; Transliteration: "Nazo no piramiddosu!? ejiputo dai bōken" (Japanese: 謎のピラミッドス！？ エジプト大冒険)	September 1, 2017
874	"The Schedule Clock"; Transliteration: "Sukejūru tokei" (Japanese: スケジュール時計)	September 8, 2017
875	"Nin'nin Training Set"; Transliteration: "Nin'nin shugyō setto" (Japanese: ニンニン修行セット)	September 8, 2017
876	"Aren't You Nobita, the Cat?"; Transliteration: "Neko no Nobita irimasen ka" (Japanese: ネコののび太いりませんか)	September 15, 2017
877	"Prize Winning Cowbot"; Transliteration: "Shōhin kasegi kaubotto" (Japanese: 賞品かせぎカウボット)	September 15, 2017
878	"Multiplication Liquid"; Transliteration: "Baibain" (Japanese: バイバイン)	October 13, 2017
879	"The Forceful Athletic School"; Transliteration: "Muriyari asurechikkusukūru" (Japanese: むりやりアスレチックスクール)	October 13, 2017
880	"Oh, Lovely Mii-chan!"; Transliteration: "Sutekinamīchan" (Japanese: すてきなミイちゃん)	October 20, 2017
881	"Magical Girl Shizu-chan"; Transliteration: "Majo-kko shizuchan" (Japanese: 魔女っ子しずちゃん)	October 20, 2017
882	"The Emperor's New Clothes!? Super Armor"; Transliteration: "Hadakanoōsama! ? Urutorayoroi" (Japanese: はだかの王様！？ウルトラよろい)	October 27, 2017
883	"The Girl With the Red Shoes"; Transliteration: "Aka ikutsu no on'nanoko" (Japanese: 赤いくつの女の子)	October 27, 2017
884	"Spider Web Cable"; Transliteration: "Kumonoiton" (Japanese: クモノイトン)	November 3, 2017
885	"Proposal Strategy"; Transliteration: "Puropōzu sakusen" (Japanese: プロポーズ作戦)	November 3, 2017
886	"Nobita the Leaf Detective"; Transliteration: "Happa tantei Nobita" (Japanese: 葉っぱ探偵のび太)	November 10, 2017
887	"Feudal Lord of the 21st Century"; Transliteration: "Ni jū ichi seiki no oto no sama" (Japanese: 二十一世紀のおとのさま)	November 10, 2017
888	"Inventing with the Inventing Machine"; Transliteration: "Hatsumeikā de dai hatsumei" (Japanese: ハツメイカーで大発明)	November 17, 2017
889	"Sharing Secrets in a Cannon"; Transliteration: "Taihō de naisho no hanashi" (Japanese: 大砲でないしょのはなし)	November 17, 2017
890	"A World Without Mirrors"; Transliteration: "Kagami no nai sekai" (Japanese: かがみのない世界)	November 24, 2017
891	"All Sorts of Future Treasure Appraisals"; Transliteration: "Pinkiri! Otakara mirai kantei" (Japanese: ピンキリ！お宝未来鑑定)	November 24, 2017
892	"Christmas in the House of Candies"; Transliteration: "Kurisumasu wa okashi no ie de" (Japanese: クリスマスはおかしの家で)	December 1, 2017
893	"The Wish Realizing Machine Is Too Much!"; Transliteration: "Yari sugi! Nozomijitsugenki" (Japanese: やりすぎ！のぞみ実現機)	December 1, 2017
894	"Zodiac Transformation Dice"; Transliteration: "Jūnishi henshin saikoro" (Japanese: 十二支変身サイコロ)	December 31, 2017
895	"The Dream Channel"; Transliteration: "Yumenochan'neru" (Japanese: ゆめのチャンネル)	December 31, 2017

== 2018 ==
No.	Title	Original release date
896	"A Hand of Love to God's Robot!"; Transliteration: "Kami-sama robotto ni ai no te o!" (Japanese: 神さまロボットに愛の手を!)	January 7, 2018
897	"Rich as a Yen Pit"; Transliteration: "En pitsu de ōganemochi" (Japanese: 円ピツで大金持ち)	January 7, 2018
898	"Nobita the Gunfighter"; Transliteration: "Ganfaitā Nobita" (Japanese: ガンファイターのび太)	January 12, 2018
899	"Viking, By All Means"; Transliteration: "Nandemobaikingu" (Japanese: なんでもバイキング)	January 19, 2018
900	"Jack, Betty, and Jenny"; Transliteration: "Jakku to beti to janī" (Japanese: ジャックとベティとジャニー)	January 19, 2018
901	"Fictitious Character Egg"; Transliteration: "Kakūjinbutsutamago" (Japanese: 架空人物たまご)	January 26, 2018
902	"Doradora Spy Battle"; Transliteration: "Doradora supaidaisakusen" (Japanese: ドラドラスパイ大作戦)	January 26, 2018
903	"Roboko Loves You"; Transliteration: "Robo-ko ga itoshi teru" (Japanese: ロボ子が愛してる)	February 2, 2018
904	"Big Trouble! Suneo's Test Result"; Transliteration: "Dai pinchi! Suneotto no tōan" (Japanese: 大ピンチ！スネ夫の答案)	February 2, 2018
905	"Dwarf Robot"; Transliteration: "Kobi to robotto" (Japanese: こびとロボット)	February 9, 2018
906	"Space Expedition!? The Back Mountain Planet"; Transliteration: "Uchūta n ken! Urayama-boshi" (Japanese: 宇宙たんけん！ウラヤマ星)	February 9, 2018
907	"Gian vs Mecha Gian"; Transliteration: "Jaian vs mekajaian" (Japanese: ジャイアンvsメカジャイアン)	February 16, 2018
908	"The Story of Getting Pinched by a Fox"; Transliteration: "Kitsune ni tsumama reta hanashi" (Japanese: きつねにつままれた話)	February 16, 2018
909	"The Troublesome Gulliver"; Transliteration: "Meiwaku garibā" (Japanese: めいわくガリバー)	February 23, 2018
910	"Nobita Runs Away From Home for a Long Time"; Transliteration: "Nobita no naga ~ i iede" (Japanese: のび太のなが～い家出)	February 23, 2018
-	"Doraemon the Movie 2017: Great Adventure in the Antarctic Kachi Kochi"	March 2, 2018
911	"Convenient Treasure Island"; Transliteration: "Hodohodo takarajima" (Japanese: ほどほど宝島)	March 9, 2018
912	"Owl Man Suit"; Transliteration: "Fukuromansūtsu" (Japanese: フクロマンスーツ)	April 6, 2018
913	"I Found Tsuchinoko!"; Transliteration: "Tsuchinoko mitsuketa!" (Japanese: ツチノコみつけた！)	April 6, 2018
914	"Take It Back with the Remote Control Cat!"; Transliteration: "Rimokon neko de tori kaese!" (Japanese: リモコンねこでとり返せ！)	April 6, 2018
915	"The Transformation Biscuits"; Transliteration: "Dōbutsuhenshinbisuketto" (Japanese: 動物変身ビスケット)	April 13, 2018
916	"The Progression-Regression Beam"; Transliteration: "Shinka taika kōsen jū" (Japanese: 動物変身ビスケット)	April 13, 2018
917	Transliteration: "Bun bu ku dora kama" (Japanese: ぶんぶくドラ釜)	April 20, 2018
918	"I Got 100%, For Once in My Life..."; Transliteration: "Isshō ni ichido wa hyaku-ten o…" (Japanese: 一生に一度は百点を…)	April 20, 2018
919	"The Dangerous Living Creature Park in the Mountain"; Transliteration: "Ura yama kiken seibutsu pāku" (Japanese: うら山危険生物パーク)	April 27, 2018
920	"All-in-one Rein"; Transliteration: "Haidōtadzuna" (Japanese: はいどうたづな)	April 27, 2018
921	"Swapping Moms"; Transliteration: "Mama o torikae kko" (Japanese: ママをとりかえっこ)	May 11, 2018
922	"Even a Cushion Has a Soul"; Transliteration: "Zabuton ni mo tama shī ga aru" (Japanese: ざぶとんにもたましいがある)	May 11, 2018
923	"Nobita's The Only Creature on Earth"; Transliteration: "Nobita wa sekai ni tada ichi-biki" (Japanese: のび太は世界にただ一匹)	May 18, 2018
924	"Horizon Tape"; Transliteration: "Chiheisen tēpu" (Japanese: 地平線テープ)	May 18, 2018
925	"Nininja! Karakuri Ninja Mansion"; Transliteration: "Nininja! Karakuri ninja yashiki" (Japanese: ニニンジャ！からくり忍者屋敷)	May 25, 2018
926	"The Friend Circle"; Transliteration: "Tomodachinowa" (Japanese: 友だちの輪)	May 25, 2018
927	"Summer! Mountains! The Nobi Family's Camp"; Transliteration: "Natsuda! Yamada! Nobi-ka no kyanpu" (Japanese: 夏だ！山だ！野比家のキャンプ)	June 1, 2018
928	"Instant Robot"; Transliteration: "Insutantorobotto" (Japanese: インスタントロボット)	June 1, 2018
929	"Put a Fire On The Har Light"; Transliteration: "Hā-tō ni hi o tomose" (Japanese: ハー灯に火をともせ)	June 8, 2018
930	"It's Tough To Be a Rain Man"; Transliteration: "Ame otokohatsuraiyo" (Japanese: 雨男はつらいよ)	June 8, 2018
931	"Gian's Lullaby"; Transliteration: "Jaian no komori uta" (Japanese: ジャイアンの子守歌)	June 15, 2018
932	"Level Me Up"; Transliteration: "Ore-sama o gurēdoappu" (Japanese: おれさまをグレードアップ)	June 15, 2018
933	"The Making of a Television Channel"; Transliteration: "Terebikyoku o hajimeta yo" (Japanese: テレビ局をはじめたよ)	June 22, 2018
934	"Switching Gun"; Transliteration: "Hito no mi ni naru tachibagan" (Japanese: 人の身になるタチバガン)	June 22, 2018
935	"Enjoying Memories With a Recording Machine"; Transliteration: "Rokukenki de tanoshimou" (Japanese: 録験機でたのしもう)	June 29, 2018
936	"The Rewarding Headband"; Transliteration: "Asekkakin" (Japanese: アセッカキン)	June 29, 2018
937	"Fishing Stars Among the Clouds"; Transliteration: "Amanogawa de hoshi tsuri o" (Japanese: 天の川で星釣りを)	July 6, 2018
938	"The Wishing Star"; Transliteration: "Negai-boshi" (Japanese: ねがい星)	July 6, 2018
939	"Courage Testing Glasses"; Transliteration: "Ki mo dame shi megane" (Japanese: きもだめしめがね)	July 20, 2018
940	"The Living Origami"; Transliteration: "Iki mono ori ga mi" (Japanese: いきものおりがみ)	July 20, 2018
941	"Superb! The Flowing Somen Miniature Garden"; Transliteration: "Zekkei! Hakoniwa sōmen nagashi" (Japanese: 絶景！箱庭ソーメン流し)	July 27, 2018
942	"Half, and Half, and Half Again"; Transliteration: "Hanbun no hanbun no mata hanbun" (Japanese: 半分の半分のまた半分)	July 27, 2018
943	"Friendship Capsule"; Transliteration: "Yūjō kapuseru" (Japanese: 友情カプセル)	August 3, 2018
944	"Jaiko's Lover = Nobita"; Transliteration: "Jai-ko no koibito = Nobita" (Japanese: ジャイ子の恋人=のび太)	August 3, 2018
945	"Go Through The Picture Frame To The Sea"; Transliteration: "Gakubuchi o kugutte umi e" (Japanese: 額縁をくぐって海へ)	August 17, 2018
946	"Chukenper"; Transliteration: "Chūkenpā" (Japanese: チューケンパー)	August 17, 2018
947	"The Lying Mirror"; Transliteration: "Uso-tsuki kagami" (Japanese: うそつきかがみ)	August 24, 2018
948	""Anything is 10 Yen" Store"; Transliteration: "Jū-en nan demo sutoa" (Japanese: 十円なんでもストア)	August 24, 2018
949	"The Easy Way of a Hermit"; Transliteration: "Sen'nin rakuraku kōsu" (Japanese: 仙人らくらくコース)	August 31, 2018
950	"The Bad Luck Diamond"; Transliteration: "Akuundaiya" (Japanese: 悪運ダイヤ)	August 31, 2018
951	"A Whale and Mystery of Pipe Island"; Transliteration: "Kujira to ma boroshi no paipu shima" (Japanese: クジラとまぼろしのパイプ島)	September 7, 2018
952	"Doraemon's Song"; Transliteration: "Doraemon'nouta" (Japanese: ドラえもんの歌)	September 14, 2018
953	"Correlation Diagram Maker"; Transliteration: "Sōkan-zu mēkā" (Japanese: 相関図メーカー)	September 14, 2018
954	"Running Across Time! The Time Borrowing Race"; Transliteration: "Toki o hashire! Taimu karimono kyōsō" (Japanese: 時を走れ！タイム借り物競走)	October 12, 2018
955	"The Stupidity Time Bombs"; Transliteration: "Jigenbakadan" (Japanese: 時限バカ弾)	October 12, 2018
956	"Sorcerer Nobita"; Transliteration: "Mahōtsukai Nobita" (Japanese: 魔法使いのび太)	October 19, 2018
957	"Nobi House, The Dream Hot Spring Trip"; Transliteration: "Nobi-ka, yume no onsen ryokō" (Japanese: 野比家、夢の温泉旅行)	October 19, 2018
958	"Combining Glue"; Transliteration: "Gattainori" (Japanese: 合体ノリ)	October 26, 2018
959	"Go! Nobita Man"; Transliteration: "Ike! Nobitaman" (Japanese: 行け！ノビタマン)	October 26, 2018
960	"Various Soda Set"; Transliteration: "Iroiro sōdasetto" (Japanese: いろいろソーダセット)	November 2, 2018
961	"Magic Box"; Transliteration: "Majikkubokkusu" (Japanese: マジックボックス)	November 2, 2018
962	"Aibou"; Transliteration: "Ai bō" (Japanese: あい棒)	November 9, 2018
963	"The Lie Speaker"; Transliteration: "Atokarahontosupīkā" (Japanese: アトカラホントスピーカー)	November 9, 2018
964	"Nobita's Shooting Stars"; Transliteration: "Nobita no nagareboshi" (Japanese: のび太の流れ星)	November 16, 2018
965	"The Over-exaggerating Overcoat"; Transliteration: "Ōbāōbā" (Japanese: オーバーオーバー)	November 16, 2018
966	"Doraemon Stove"; Transliteration: "Doraemon sutōbu" (Japanese: ドラえもんストーブ)	November 23, 2018
967	"Growing Persimmons In One Night"; Transliteration: "Hitoban de kaki no mi ga natta" (Japanese: 一晩でカキの実がなった)	November 23, 2018
968	"The Helping Hand Spray"; Transliteration: "Tsudzukiwoyoroshiku" (Japanese: つづきをヨロシク)	November 30, 2018
969	"What If We Turn Day Into Night!?"; Transliteration: "Moshimo bokkusu de hiru fukashi! ?" (Japanese: もしもボックスで昼ふかし!？)	November 30, 2018
970	"The Fearsome Happiness Cards"; Transliteration: "Shiawase toranpu no kyōfu" (Japanese: しあわせトランプの恐怖)	December 7, 2018
971	"Christmas Cards from the Future"; Transliteration: "Mirai no kurisumasukādo" (Japanese: 未来のクリスマスカード)	December 7, 2018
972	"The Urashima Candy"; Transliteration: "Urashimakyandē" (Japanese: ウラシマキャンデー)	December 14, 2018
973	"Escape with the Substitution Stickers!"; Transliteration: "Shīru de nige kire!" (Japanese: シールで逃げきれ！)	December 14, 2018
974	"Kukku, the Kamaitachi"; Transliteration: "Kamai-tachi no Kukku" (Japanese: かまいたちのクック)	December 31, 2018

== 2019 ==
No.	Title	Original release date
975	"The Smoke Monster of the Lamp"; Transliteration: "Ranpunokemuriobake" (Japanese: ランプのけむりオバケ)	January 18, 2019
976	"Gian Stew"; Transliteration: "Jaian shichū" (Japanese: ジャイアンシチュー)	January 18, 2019
977	"Pyonta in My Pocket"; Transliteration: "Poketto no naka no pyon Dai" (Japanese: ポケットの中のぴょん太)	January 25, 2019
978	"Peace Antenna"; Transliteration: "Heiwaantena" (Japanese: 平和アンテナ)	January 25, 2019
979	"Event Balloon"; Transliteration: "Fesutibarūn" (Japanese: フェスティバルーン)	February 8, 2019
980	"The Warm Snowball Fight"; Transliteration: "Hokahoka yuki de yukigassen" (Japanese: ホカホカ雪で雪合戦)	February 8, 2019
981	"Think-Of Cumin"; Transliteration: "Nekketsu ōen maiku" (Japanese: 熱血応援マイク)	February 15, 2019
982	"A Hot Blood Support Microphone"; Transliteration: "Omoikomin" (Japanese: オモイコミン)	February 15, 2019
983	"Dorakaguya is returning to the moon!?" Transliteration: "Dora kagu ya, tsukinikaeru!?" (Japanese: ドラかぐや、月に帰る！？)	February 22, 2019
984	"Werewolf Cream"; Transliteration: "O okami otoko kurīmu" (Japanese: おおかみ男クリーム)	February 22, 2019
-	"Doraemon: Nobita's Treasure Island"	March 1, 2019
985	"The Time Cloth"; Transliteration: "Taimu furoshiki" (Japanese: タイムふろしき)	March 8, 2019
986	"The Fake Alien"; Transliteration: "Nise uchūbito" (Japanese: ニセ宇宙人)	March 8, 2019
987	"The Big Fossil Discovery"; Transliteration: "Kaseki daihakken!" (Japanese: 化石大発見！)	March 15, 2019
988	"Fluffy on Futon"; Transliteration: "Futon ni notte fuwafuwari" (Japanese: 布団にのってふわふわり)	March 15, 2019
989	"The City of Dreams, Nobita Land"; Transliteration: "Yume no Machi Nobita Rando" (Japanese: ゆめの町、ノビタランド)	April 5, 2019
990	"Look at Doraemon! His Secret"; Transliteration: "Doraemon o nozoi chae!" (Japanese: ドラえもんをのぞいちゃえ！)	April 5, 2019
991	"The Dajale Land"; Transliteration: "Dajarērando" (Japanese: ダジャレーランド)	April 19, 2019
992	"The Invincible! Insect Pills"; Transliteration: "Muteki! Konchū ni" (Japanese: 無敵！コンチュー丹)	April 19, 2019
993	"Tajami Rice Field"; Transliteration: "Tatami no tanbo" (Japanese: タタミのたんぼ)	April 26, 2019
994	"Shopping in the Future"; Transliteration: "Mirai kara no kaimono" (Japanese: 未来からの買い物)	April 26, 2019
995	"How to Eat the Delicous Nobita"; Transliteration: "Nobita no oishī tabe-kata" (Japanese: のび太のおいしい食べ方)	May 10, 2019
996	"The Cooking Badges"; Transliteration: "O ryōri wappen" (Japanese: お料理ワッペン)	May 10, 2019
997	"The Courtesy Candy"; Transliteration: "Shitsuke kyandī" (Japanese: しつけキャンディー)	May 17, 2019
998	"The Taste Seasoning of the Human World"; Transliteration: "Ningenmi chōmiryō" (Japanese: 人間味調味料)	May 17, 2019
999	"Trampolingen"; Transliteration: "Toranporingen" (Japanese: トランポリンゲン)	May 31, 2019
1000	"Soap Bubble Courier"; Transliteration: "Shabontama takuhaibin" (Japanese: シャボン玉宅配便)	May 31, 2019
1001	"Save the Neanderthals"; Transliteration: "Neanderutāru hito o sukue" (Japanese: ネアンデルタール人を救え)	June 7, 2019
1002	"Once in a While, Nobita Can Think, Too"; Transliteration: "Nobita mo tamani wa kangaeru" (Japanese: のび太もたまには考える)	June 7, 2019
1003	"Gian is a Big Star!?"; Transliteration: "Dai sutājaian!?" (Japanese: 大スタージャイアン！？)	June 14, 2019
1004	"The Fear of the Dinner Show"; Transliteration: "Kyōfu no dināshō" (Japanese: 恐怖のディナーショー)	June 14, 2019
1005	"The Gawara Demon"; Transliteration: "Gawaraoni" (Japanese: ガワラオニ)	June 21, 2019
1006	"The Millionaire Straw"; Transliteration: "Chōjawarashibe" (Japanese: チョージャワラシベ)	June 21, 2019
1007	"A Guy Wants To Be Praised On A Video!"; Transliteration: "Hon'nin bideo de home raretai" (Japanese: 本人ビデオでほめられたい)	June 28, 2019
1008	"Fire, Fire, Firefly Coming"; Transliteration: "Ho, ho, hotaru koi" (Japanese: ホ、ホ、ホタル来い)	June 28, 2019
1009	"The Cotton Candy Cloud Maker"; Transliteration: "Wataga shi kumo mēkā" (Japanese: わたがし雲メーカー)	July 5, 2019
1010	"Wish Tanabata Rocket"; Transliteration: "Negai tanabata roketto" (Japanese: ねがい七夕ロケット)	July 5, 2019
1011	"Doraemon's Design Colored"; Transliteration: "Irogaradora e mon" (Japanese: イロガラドラえもん)	July 19, 2019
1012	"How to Walk on the Sea Floor Without Getting in the Ocean"; Transliteration: "Umi ni hairazu kaitei o sanpo suru hōhō" (Japanese: 海に入らず海底を散歩する方法)	July 19, 2019
1013	"Summer Vacation In The 22nd Century"; Transliteration: "22 seiki de natsuyasumi" (Japanese: ２２世紀で夏休み)	July 19, 2019
1014	"Great Panic! Nobita's Sunflower Diary"; Transliteration: "Dai panikku! Nobita no himawari nikki" (Japanese: 大パニック！のび太のヒマワリ日記)	August 2, 2019
1015	"The King of Sharpshooting Contest"; Transliteration: "Kenjū-ō kontesuto" (Japanese: けん銃王コンテスト)	August 2, 2019
1016	"It's Amazing!? Seven Wonders of School"; Transliteration: "Zokuzoku! ? Gakkō no nanafushigi" (Japanese: ゾクゾク！？学校の七不思議)	August 9, 2019
1017	"Cannibal House"; Transliteration: "Hito-gui hausu" (Japanese: 人食いハウス)	August 9, 2019
1018	"The Three-Dimensional Puzzle Hammer"; Transliteration: "Rittai pazuruhanmā" (Japanese: 立体パズルハンマー)	August 23, 2019
1019	"The Watercycline"; Transliteration: "Santain" (Japanese: サンタイン)	August 23, 2019
1020	"The Fear of Tincture"; Transliteration: "Kyōfu no tatarichinki" (Japanese: 恐怖のたたりチンキ)	August 30, 2019
1021	"Replicotco Fireworks"; Transliteration: "Repurikokko hanabi" (Japanese: レプリコッコ花火)	August 30, 2019
1022	"The Maze of Future Strange Castle"; Transliteration: "Mirai no Labyrinth Okashi Castle" (Japanese: 未来の迷宮(ラビリンス)おかし城(キャッスル))	September 6, 2019
-	"Doraemon's Moving!?"; Transliteration: "Doraemon no o hikkoshi!?" (Japanese: ドラえもんのお引越し!?)	September 6, 2019
1023	"Catshot"; Transliteration: "Neko kkaburi" (Japanese: ねこっかぶり)	October 5, 2019
1024	"Strong Stone"; Transliteration: "Tsuyo~i ishi" (Japanese: 強～いイシ)	October 5, 2019
1025	"Full of Doraemon"; Transliteration: "Doraemon ga ippai" (Japanese: ドラえもんがいっぱい)	October 19, 2019
1026	"Armadillon"; Transliteration: "Arumajiron" (Japanese: アルマジロン)	October 19, 2019
1027	"Transformation Reprinter"; Transliteration: "Henshin repurintā" (Japanese: 変身レプリンター)	October 26, 2019
1028	"The Swallow Nobita"; Transliteration: "Tsubame no Nobita" (Japanese: ツバメののび太)	October 26, 2019
1029	"The Fishing Pond for Things You Dropped"; Transliteration: "Otoshimono Tsuri Bori" (Japanese: 落とし物つりぼり)	November 2, 2019
1030	"I Want A Strong Pet"; Transliteration: "Tsuyoi Petto ga Hoshī" (Japanese: 強いペットがほしい)	November 2, 2019
1031	"Full of Big Dorayaki"; Transliteration: "Heya Ippai no Dai Dorayaki" (Japanese: へやいっぱいの大どらやき)	November 9, 2019
1032	"The Versailles Mama"; Transliteration: "Verusaiyu no Mama" (Japanese: ヴェルサイユのママ)	November 16, 2019
1033	"Ultra Ring"; Transliteration: "Urutora Ringu" (Japanese: ウルトラリング)	November 23, 2019
1034	"Go Ahead to the Picnic"; Transliteration: "Pikunikku de saki o kose" (Japanese: ピクニックで先をこせ)	November 30, 2019
1035	"Multi-purpose Amulet has a Strong Sense of Responsibility"; Transliteration: "Ta Mokuteki Omamori wa Sekininkan ga Tsuyoi" (Japanese: 多目的お守りは責任感が強い)	December 7, 2019
1036	"The Investigator Set"; Transliteration: "Sōsagokko Setto" (Japanese: 捜査ごっこセット)	December 14, 2019
1037	"The Moai Statues Of Easter Island"; Transliteration: "Isutā tō no Moai" (Japanese: イースター島のモアイ)	December 14, 2019
1038	"The Presents From Time Skipping Pulley"; Transliteration: "Taimu Wāpu de Purezento o" (Japanese: タイムワープでプレゼントを)	December 21, 2019
1039	"It's the Year of the Mouse, Doraemon"; Transliteration: "Nezuminendayo ！ Doraemon" (Japanese: ネズミ年だよ！ドラえもん)	December 28, 2019
1040	"Lucky Money... Come Out Now!"; Transliteration: "Detekuru Detekuru Otoshidama" (Japanese: 出てくる出てくるお年玉)	December 28, 2019

== 2020 ==
No.	Title	Directed by	Written by	Original release date
1041	"Amazing AI Robot Monkey"; Transliteration: "Nan Demo Ēaiai" (Japanese: なんでもエーアイアイ)	Tsunataro Miyake	Kimihito Ito	January 11, 2020
Nobita tells Doraemon that if there is a robot that can do anything while sleeping and hearing that, Doraemon pulls out one of his gadgets, Amazing AI Robot Monkey. The robot needed to be taught from the beginning, so Nobita started to coach it right away. However, later on, with the robot having benefits for Nobita, Nobita doesn't mind if Doraemon disappears.
1042	"Useful Vending Machines"; Transliteration: "Yakudatsu Mono Hanbaiki" (Japanese: 役立つもの販売機)	Tomokazu Ujiie	Sato Dai	January 11, 2020
All of the papers that Nobita's mother were originally planned to use is created into paper airplanes. So, Doraemon take out a gadget, called the "Useful Things Vending Machine".
1043	"Then, Everyone Became Sweet Potatoes?"; Transliteration: "Soshite, Min'na Imo ni Naru" (Japanese: そして、みんなイモになる)	Katsuya Oshima	Sato Dai	January 18, 2020
The snack for today is Popcorn and Doraemon is feeling disappointed. So, Doraemon takes out the Collector Megaphone, a gadget that can replace anything the person like, and screams that Dorayaki is better. Much to his shock, the popcorn ended up turning into a Dorayaki. Nobita, seeing this, screams that Manga is better, which transforms all of his textbooks into exactly what he wanted. However, after playing a prank on Gian and Suneo, the megaphone is stolen.
1044	"The Clay Robot"; Transliteration: "Nendo Roido" (Japanese: ネンドロイド)	Satsukime Yuusaku	Shimizu East	January 18, 2020
One day, Nobita spotted a mysterious human-like object inside of his room and is close to eating Doraemon's Dorayaki, but Doraemon arrived and grabbed the food from the object. He then explained that the human-like object is actually a "Nendoroid," which moves like a person when sticking it from the hair. After that, Nobita sticks his hair to the Nendoroid and gets the Nendoroid to do the homework, but everything doesn't well and after Nobita's mother asked to run a errand, Nobita send the Nendoroid instead, just for it to never come back. So, Nobita goes out to catch the Nendoroid.
1045	"Watch Out For The Y Candle!"; Transliteration: "Y Rō ni Kiwotsukero!" (Japanese: Ｙワイロウに気きをつけろ！)	Shigeo Koshi	Takahiro Nagano	January 25, 2020
After "Gians," a baseball team kept on losing, Gian demoted some of the players, including Nobita, and refused them to play any more and to instead pick up balls. Upset, Nobita runs to Doraemon to explain what happened. Doraemon decided to motivate him to work harder than before, which makes Nobita motivated to practice more. However, Nobita's mother, who thinks that studying is more important, takes away the bat and glove. Following that, Doraemon takes out "Y-Law" and gives it to the mother, who gives back the stuff that Nobita needed. The both practice, but Doraemon gets more and more angry when Nobita keeps on failing.
1046	"God Robot Extends His Hand of Love!"; Transliteration: "Kami-sama Robotto ni ai no te o!" (Japanese: 神かみさまロボットに愛あいの手てを！)	Tsunataro Miyake	Aiuchi Mio	January 25, 2020
When Gian takes away his brand new comic, Nobita complains that God doesn't exist. So, Doraemon takes out the "God Robot," which grants a total of three wishes. After that, Nobita and his friends placed the robot on the road, which briefly moves but falls flat on the face. Gian, who was passing by, picked the robot up and then kicked it. Later on, they go to Skizuka's house, where they invite Skizuka, who is upset about her broken finger. However, after seeing the robot, Skizuka picks it up and says that she is hungry, where the robot immediately cooks her some food and heals her finger.
1047	"Gratitude Halo"; Transliteration: "Arigatāya" (Japanese: アリガターヤ)	Shigeo Koshi	Naohiro Fukushima	February 1, 2020
1048	"I Found a Tsuchinoko!"; Transliteration: "Tsuchinoko Mitsuketa!" (Japanese: ツチノコみつけた!)	Yoshihiko Iwata	Kimihito Ito	February 1, 2020
1049	"The Castaway Story from Long Ago"; Transliteration: "Ōmukashi Hyōryū-ki" (Japanese: 大おおむかし漂流ひょうりゅう記)	Takami Doyama	Kimihito Ito	February 8, 2020
1050	"Robot Snowman"; Transliteration: "Robotto yukidaruma" (Japanese: ロボット雪だるま)	Tomokazu Ujiie	Kimihito Ito	February 8, 2020
1051	"Dream Walker"; Transliteration: "Tachi Yumebō" (Japanese: 立たちユメぼう)	Tsunataro Miyake	Shimizu East	February 15, 2020
1052	"Esper Suneo"; Transliteration: "Esupā Suneo" (Japanese: エスパースネ夫)	Tsunataro Miyake	Takahiro Nagano	February 15, 2020
1053	"Doraemon Becomes a Cat"; Transliteration: "Neko ni Natta Doraemon" (Japanese: ネコになったドラえもん)	Yoshihiko Iwata	Kimihito Ito	February 22, 2020
1054	"Peace Antenna"; Transliteration: "Heiwaantena" (Japanese: 平へい和わアンテナ)	Yoshihiko Iwata	Sato Dai	February 22, 2020
1055	"Anniversary Sticker"; Transliteration: "Kinenbi shīru" (Japanese: 記き念ねん日びシール)	Yumeko Iwaoka	Shimizu East	February 29, 2020
1056	"The Wish Realizing Machine Has Gone Too Far!"; Transliteration: "Yari sugi! Nozomijitsugenki" (Japanese: やりすぎ！のぞみ実じつ現げん機)	Yoshihiko Iwata	Yoguchi Natsue	February 29, 2020
-	"Doraemon: Nobita's Chronicle of the Moon Exploration"	Shinnosuke Yakuwa	Tsujimura Mizuki	February 29, 2020
1057	"Doraemon Is An Exam Student Now!?"; Transliteration: "Doraemon ga jukensei" (Japanese: ドラえもんが受験生じゅけんせい！？)	Katsuya Oshima	Sato Dai	March 7, 2020
1058	"To Miss Yumeko Nijitani"; Transliteration: "Haikei, Nijitani Yumeko-san" (Japanese: 拝はい啓けい、虹にじ谷たにユメ子こさん)	Yoshihiko Iwata	Aiuchi Mio	March 7, 2020
1059	"Creating the Earth"; Transliteration: "Chikyū seizō-hō" (Japanese: 地ち球きゅう製せい造ぞう法)	Satsukime Yuusaku	Kimihito Ito	March 14, 2020
1060	"Magic Zip"; Transliteration: "Majikku Chakku" (Japanese: マジックチャック)	Satsukime Yuusaku	Yoguchi Natsue	March 14, 2020
1061	"Easy Barbecue Set is Not Easy" (楽々バーべキューセットはラクじゃない)	Tomokazu Ujiie	Mizuno Munenori	March 14, 2020
1062	"The Apartment Tree"; Transliteration: "Apāto no ki" (Japanese: アパートの木)	Tomokazu Ujiie	Naohiro Fukushima	March 21, 2020
1062	"Rich As A Yen Pit"; Transliteration: "En pitsu de ōganemochi" (Japanese: 円えんピツで大おお金がね持もち)	Tsunataro Miyake	Shimizu East	March 21, 2020
1063	"Thousand Needle Trout"; Transliteration: "Hari Senbon no masu" (Japanese: ハリ千せん本ぼんノマス)	Tomokazu Ujiie	Suzuki Yosuke	March 28, 2020
1064	"Cinderella Nobita"; Transliteration: "Nobita Shinderera" (Japanese: のび太シンデレラ)	Takuya Fujikura	Naohiro Fukushima	March 28, 2020
1065	"The Wallpaper Scenery Changer"; Transliteration: "Kabe keshiki kirikae-ki" (Japanese: かべ景け色しききりかえ機)	Yoshihiko Iwata	Shimizu East	April 4, 2020
1066	"Time Flies Ceaselessly"; Transliteration: "‘Toki’ wa gōgō to nagareru" (Japanese: 『時とき』はゴウゴウと流ながれる)	Yoshihiko Iwata	SKimihito Ito	April 4, 2020
1067	"Treasure Hunting with Flaps" (Japanese: 宝さがしはバタ足で)	Yoshihiko Iwata	Kimihito Ito	April 11, 2020
1068	"The Sleeping Man's Pillow" (Japanese: 三年寝太郎まくら)	Tsunataro Miyake	Eizo Kobayashi	April 11, 2020
1069	"Plus Vinegar and Minus Vinegar"; Transliteration: "Pura su maina su" (Japanese: プラ酢すマイナ酢)	Tsunataro Miyake	Suzuki Yosuke	April 18, 2020
1070	"Spider Web Cable"; Transliteration: "Kumonoiton" (Japanese: クモノイトン)	Shigeo Koshi	Yoguchi Natsue	April 18, 2020
1071	"Around the World in an Aerostat!" (Japanese: 気球で世界一周！?)	Shigeo Koshi	Suzuki Yosuke	April 25, 2020
1072	"Big Trouble! Suneo's Test Result"; Transliteration: "Dai pinchi! Suneo no tōan" (Japanese: 大だいピンチ！スネ夫おの答とう案)	Yoshihiko Iwata	Eizo Kobayashi	April 25, 2020
1073	"Memory Bank"; Transliteration: "Memorīrōn" (Japanese: メモリーローン)	Yumeko Iwaoka	Naohiro Fukushima	May 2, 2020
1074	"Level Me Up"; Transliteration: "Ore-sama o gurēdoappu" (Japanese: おれさまをグレードアップ)	Shigeo Koshi	Eizo Kobayashi	May 2, 2020
1075	"Thoughtful Spears Pierced into the Heart"; Transliteration: "Kokoro ni sasaru omoi yari" (Japanese: こころにささるおもいヤリ)	Suzuki Yosuke	Satsukime Yuusaku	May 9, 2020
1076	"The Schedule Clock"; Transliteration: "Sukejūru dokei" (Japanese: スケジュールどけい)	Tsunataro Miyake	Sato Dai	May 9, 2020
1077	"Be Careful When Sneezing"; Transliteration: "Kushami ni kiwotsukero" (Japanese: くしゃみに気きをつけろ)	Takuya Fujikura	Kimihito Ito	May 16, 2020
1078	"The Friend Circle" (Japanese: 友だちの輪)	Tsunataro Miyake	Yuya Takahashi	May 16, 2020
1079	"Making Character Products"; Transliteration: "Kyarakutāguzzu o tsukutchae!" (Japanese: キャラクターグッズを作っちゃえ!)	Katsuya Oshima	Shimizu East	May 23, 2020
1080	"The Best Fan Letter for Gian"; Transliteration: "Jaian e no saikō no fanretā" (Japanese: ジャイアンへの最高のファンレター)	Yoshihiko Iwata	Yoguchi Natsue	May 23, 2020
1081	"Calling Necklace"; Transliteration: "Kōringunekkuresu" (Japanese: コーリングネックレス)	Yumeko Iwaoka	Shimizu East	May 30, 2020
1082	"The Mystery of the Ghost Mouth"; Transliteration: "Yūrei no kuchi no nazo" (Japanese: 幽霊の口の謎)	Shigeo Koshi	Eizo Kobayashi	May 30, 2020
1083	"The Fearsome Justice Rope"; Transliteration: "Osorubeki seigi no rōpu" (Japanese: 恐るべき正義のロープ)	Satsukime Yuusaku	Suzuki Yosuke	June 6, 2020
1084	"The Forceful Athletic School"; Transliteration: "Hakuryoku aru taiikukaikei sukūru" (Japanese: 迫力ある体育会系スクール)	Tomokazu Ujiie	Naohiro Fukushima	June 6, 2020
1085	"Nobita's Black Hole"; Transliteration: "Nobita no burakkuhōru" (Japanese: のび太のブラックホール)	Tomokazu Ujiie	Takahiro Nagano	June 13, 2020
1086	"Gian vs Mecha Gian"; Transliteration: "Jaian vs mekajaian" (Japanese: ジャイアンvsメカジャイアン)	Shigeo Koshi	Suzuki Yosuke	June 13, 2020
1087	"Forgetting Bird"; Transliteration: "Wasure tori" (Japanese: 忘れ鳥)	Katsuya Oshima	Kimihito Ito	June 20, 2020
1088	"The Invincible Super Backpack"; Transliteration: "Muteki no sūpābakkupakku" (Japanese: 無敵のスーパーバックパック)	Tomokazu Ujiie	Shimizu East	June 20, 2020
1089	"Arranging Railway by Myself"; Transliteration: "Jibun de tetsudō o tehai suru" (Japanese: つくれーるマイレール)	Tomokazu Ujiie	Takahiro Nagano	June 27, 2020
1090	"The Bad Luck Diamond"; Transliteration: "Fuun no daiyamondo" (Japanese: 不運のダイヤモンド)	Tsunataro Miyake	Kimihito Ito	June 27, 2020
1091	"The Water Slide Behind the Hill"; Transliteration: "Oka no ushiro no u~ōtāsuraidā" (Japanese: 裏山ウォータースライダー)	Park Kyung Seung	Aiuchi Mio	July 4, 2020
1092	"Parallel Planet"; Transliteration: "Heikō wakusei" (Japanese: あべこべ惑星)	Katsuya Oshima	Takahiro Nagano	July 4, 2020
1093	"The Living Origami"; Transliteration: "Creature origami" (Japanese: いきものおりがみ)	Takuya Fujikura	Kimihito Ito	July 11, 2020
1094	"The Parachute Race"; Transliteration: "Bō Ken Parashūto" (Japanese: ぼうけんパラシュート)	Yoshihiko Iwata	Kimihito Ito	July 11, 2020
1095	"Do your Best! Ghost House"; Transliteration: "Ganbare! Obake hausu" (Japanese: がんばれ！おばけハウス)	Satsukime Yuusaku	Naohiro Fukushima	July 18, 2020
1096	"Left、Straight、Right、Right、Left"; Transliteration: "Hidari, Tadashi, Migi, Migi, Hidari" (Japanese: 左、直、右、右、左)	Yoshihiko Iwata	Kimihito Ito	July 18, 2020
1097	"Prize Winning Cowbot"; Transliteration: "Shōhin kasegi kaubotto" (Japanese: 賞品かせぎカウボット)	Shigeo Koshi	Suzuki Yosuke	July 25, 2020
1098	"Highly Effective Disaster Eliminate Sticker"; Transliteration: "Kikime Ichiban Yakuyoke Shīru" (Japanese: ききめ一番やくよけシール)	Shigeo Koshi	Takahiro Nagano	July 25, 2020
1099	"Amazing Button Door"; Transliteration: "Pusshu Doa" (Japanese: プッシュドア)	Tsunataro Miyake	Suzuki Yosuke	August 1, 2020
1100	"Sweets Ranch"; Transliteration: "Okashi Bokujō" (Japanese: おかし牧場)	Yoshihiko Iwata	Eizo Kobayashi	August 1, 2020
1101	"Making Desert Island"; Transliteration: "Mujintō No Tsukuri Kata" (Japanese: 無人島のつくり方)	Tsunataro Miyake	Suzuki Yosuke	August 8, 2020
1102	"The Stupidity Time Bombs"; Transliteration: "jigen bakadan" (Japanese: 時限バカ弾)	Yoshihiko Iwata	Eizo Kobayashi	August 8, 2020
1103	"Fruit Juice Changer"; Transliteration: "Suidō Jūsu Henkan Adaputā" (Japanese: 水道ジュース変換アダプター)	Hideji Saito	Kimihito Ito	August 15, 2020
1104	"I'm Mini Doraemon"; Transliteration: "Boku Mini Doraemon" (Japanese: ぼくミニドラえもん)	Shigeo Koshi	Shimizu East	August 15, 2020
1105	"Mini Head is on the Hand and Foot"; Transliteration: "Teashi Ni Tsukeru Mini Atama" (Japanese: 手足につけるミニ頭)	Shigeo Koshi	Kimihito Ito	August 22, 2020
1106	"Dorakaguya Is Returning To The Moon!"; Transliteration: "Dora Kaguya, Tsuki Ni Kaeru ！ ？" (Japanese: ドラかぐや、月に帰る！？)	Tsunataro Miyake	Suzuki Yosuke	August 22, 2020
1107	"Capture an Enemy Easily Telescope"; Transliteration: "Teki o kantan ni tsukamaeru bōenkyō" (Japanese: 手足につけるミニ頭)	Satsukime Yuusaku	Teruko Utsumi	August 29, 2020
1108	"The Forest is Alive"; Transliteration: "Mori haikiteiru" (Japanese: 森は生きている)	Shingo Okano	Suzuki Yosuke	August 29, 2020
1109	"The Ultra Mixer"; Transliteration: "Urutora Mikisā" (Japanese: ウルトラミキサー)	Satsukime Yuusaku	Shimizu East	September 5, 2020
1110	"The Debut of the Mood-Changing Orchestra!"; Transliteration: "Mūdo Moriage Gakudan Tōjō ！" (Japanese: ムードもりあげ楽団登場)	Satsukime Yuusaku	Suzuki Yosuke	September 5, 2020
1111	"Nobita's Dinosaur"; Transliteration: "Nobita no Kyoryu" (Japanese: のび太の恐竜)	Katsuya Oshima	-	September 5, 2020
1112	"Non-Stop Happy Capsule Toy"; Transliteration: "Happīgacha Wa Yamerarenai" (Japanese: ハッピーガチャはやめられない)	Satsukime Yuusaku	Shimizu East	September 12, 2020
1113	"Magic Box"; Transliteration: "Majikku bokkusu" (Japanese: マジックボックス)	Tsunataro Miyake	Yuya Takahashi	September 12, 2020
1114	"I Can't Study in the Sahara Desert"; Transliteration: "Saharasabaku de benkyō wa dekinai" (Japanese: サハラ砂さ漠ばくで勉べん強きょうはできない)	Tsunataro Miyake	Shimizu East	September 19, 2020
1115	"Nininja! Karakuri Ninja Mansion"; Transliteration: "Nininja ！ Karakuri Ninja Yashiki" (Japanese: ニニンジャ！からくり忍者屋敷)	Tsunataro Miyake	Kimihito Ito	September 19, 2020
1116	"Teaching Adult a Lesson Armlet"; Transliteration: "Otona O Shikaru Wanshō" (Japanese: 大人をしかる腕章)	Aya Kobayashi	Suzuki Yosuke	September 26, 2020
1117	"How to Running Away to the Deserted Island"; Transliteration: "Mujintō E Iede" (Japanese: 無人島へ家出)	Takuya Fujikura	Teruko Utsumi	September 26, 2020
1118	"Peeking-a-boo Hat"; Transliteration: "Daruma San Korondabō" (Japanese: ダルマさんころんだ帽)	Hideji Saito	Shimizu East	October 3, 2020
1119	"Delivery Telephone"; Transliteration: "Nan Demo Todoku ! Demae Denwa" (Japanese: なんでも届く!出前電話)	Tomokazu Ujiie	Takahiro Nagano	October 3, 2020
1120	"Taking an Arrow to School"; Transliteration: "Yumi ya de gakkō e" (Japanese: 弓ゆみやで学がっ校こうへ)	Hideji Saito	Teruko Utsumi	October 10, 2020
1121	"May Enter the Photo Screen"; Transliteration: "Shashin Hairikomi Sukōpu" (Japanese: 写真入りこみスコープ)	Hideji Saito	Takahiro Nagano	October 10, 2020
1122	"An Emotional, Heart-Touching Expression"; Transliteration: "Jīn to kandō suru hanashi" (Japanese: ジーンと感動する話)	Yumeko Iwaoka	Kimihito Ito	October 17, 2020
1123	"Ayaushi! Lion Mask"; Transliteration: "Ayaushi ! Raion Kamen" (Japanese: あやうし!ライオン仮面)	Suzuki Daiji	Kimihito Ito	October 17, 2020
1124	"The Birth of President Nobita!"; Transliteration: "Tanjō ！ ？ Daitōryō Nobita" (Japanese: 誕生！？大統領のび太)	Takuya Fujikura	Kimihito Ito	October 24, 2020
1125	"Mad Watch"; Transliteration: "Maddo Uocchi" (Japanese: マッド・ウオッチ)	Takuya Fujikura	Teruko Utsumi	October 24, 2020
1126	"Shadow Flash"; Transliteration: "Kagebōshi Furasshu" (Japanese: 影ぼうしフラッシュ)	Yumeko Iwaoka	Suzuki Yosuke	October 31, 2020
1127	"Dracula Set"; Transliteration: "Dorakyurasetto" (Japanese: ドラキュラセット)	Aya Kobayashi	Shimizu East	October 31, 2020
1128	"Skin Removing Finger-Cot"; Transliteration: "Kawamukerun" (Japanese: カワムケルン)	Shigeo Koshi	Takahiro Nagano	November 7, 2020
1129	"Future Camera"; Transliteration: "Yukusuekamera" (Japanese: ユクスエカメラ)	Shigeo Koshi	Teruko Utsumi	November 7, 2020
1130	"Testing Robot"; Transliteration: "Yukusuekamera" (Japanese: ユクスエカメラ)	Hideji Saito	Takahiro Nagano	November 14, 2020
1131	"Treating Somebody with the Utmost Cordiality Pear in Nobita's House"; Transliteration: "Nobika de O Mote Nashi" (Japanese: 野比家でおもて梨)	Hideji Saito	Suzuki Yosuke	November 14, 2020
1132	"Using Spy Satellite to Track"; Transliteration: "Supai Eisei De Sagure" (Japanese: スパイ衛星でさぐれ)	Tsunataro Miyake	Kimihito Ito	November 21, 2020
1133	"Wish Hammer"; Transliteration: "Yayakoshī ? Uchi de no Kozuchi" (Japanese: ややこしい?うちでの小づち)	Tsunataro Miyake	Takahiro Nagano	November 21, 2020
1134	"Half-length Going-out Cloud"; Transliteration: "Hanbun o Dekake Kumo" (Japanese: 半分おでかけ雲)	Katsuya Oshima	Shimizu East	November 28, 2020
1135	"Paper for Robot"; Transliteration: "Saikyō ! Robotto Pēpā" (Japanese: 最強!ロボットペーパー)	Katsuya Oshima	Suzuki Yosuke	November 28, 2020
1136	"Nobita Comic Weekly"; Transliteration: "Baka ure !? Shūkan Nobita" (Japanese: バカ売れ!?週刊のび太)	Takuya Fujikura	Teruko Utsumi	December 5, 2020
1137	"Delivering Letter Balloon"; Transliteration: "Fūsen ga Todoketa Tegami" (Japanese: 風船がとどけた手紙)	Takuya Fujikura	Takahiro Nagano	December 5, 2020
1138	"Invisibility Eye Drops"; Transliteration: "Tōmeiningenmegusuri" (Japanese: とうめい人間目にんげんめぐすり)	Satsukime Yuusaku	Kimihito Ito	December 12, 2020
1139	"Invisibility Eye Drops"; Transliteration: "Erebētā Purēto" (Japanese: エレベーター・プレート)	Satsukime Yuusaku	Suzuki Yosuke	December 12, 2020
1140	"Trying to Shoot the Miracle Video"; Transliteration: "Mirakuru mūbī O Tottemita" (Japanese: ミラクルムービーを撮ってみた)	Yumeko Iwaoka	Shimizu East	December 19, 2020
1141	"Christmas in the House of Candies"; Transliteration: "Kurisumasu wa okashi no ie de" (Japanese: クリスマスはおかしの家で)	Takami Doyama	Shimizu East	December 19, 2020
1142	"Gian's Introspection・Nobita's Disturbance"; Transliteration: "Jaian hansei, Nobita wa meiwaku" (Japanese: ジャイアン反省、のび太はめいわく)	Shigeo Koshi	Kimihito Ito	December 26, 2020
1143	"Doodling on Doraemon"; Transliteration: "Doraemon Ni Rakugaki" (Japanese: ドラえもんに落書き)	Minoru Yamaoka	Junichi Tominaga	December 26, 2020
1144	"Supersecrecy Closeup Movie 「Universe Big Mumbo Jumbo"; Transliteration: "Chō Taisaku Tokusatsu Eiga “ Uchū dai Majin ”" (Japanese: 超大作特撮映画『宇宙大魔神)	Makoto Yoshida	Kimihito Ito	December 31, 2020
1145	"The Night Before Nobita's Wedding"; Transliteration: "Nobita no kekkon zen'ya ”" (Japanese: のび太の結婚前夜)	Shigeo Koshi	Mizuno Munenori	December 31, 2020

== 2021 ==
No.	Title	Directed by	Written by	Original release date
1146	"Good and Bad Balance Gun"; Transliteration: "Baransu chūnyū" (Japanese: バランス注射)	Hideji Saito	Takahiro Nagano	January 9, 2021
1147	"I Hate Money!"; Transliteration: "Okane nanka Dai Kirai !" (Japanese: お金なんか大きらい!)	Hideji Saito	Suzuki Yosuke	January 9, 2021
1148	"New Year's Day Sunrise Set"; Transliteration: "Hatsuhinode Setto" (Japanese: 初日の出セット)	Hideji Saito	Kimihito Ito	January 9, 2021
1149	"Secret Passage Ball Pen"; Transliteration: "nuke ana bōrupen" (Japanese: ぬけ穴ボールペン)	Tsunataro Miyake	Teruko Utsumi	January 16, 2021
1150	"Calling for Anything in TV Adhesive"; Transliteration: "Terebi Torimochi" (Japanese: テレビとりもち)	Tsunataro Miyake	Takahiro Nagano	January 16, 2021
1151	"The Snow's Hot, Hot, Hot!"; Transliteration: "Yuki de Acchicchi" (Japanese: 雪でアッチッチ)	Aya Kobayashi	Kimihito Ito	January 23, 2021
1152	"Going for a Vacuum Cleaner Drive"; Transliteration: "Doraibu wa zōjiki ni notte" (Japanese: ドライブは掃そう除じ機きにのって)	Katsuya Oshima	Kimihito Ito	January 23, 2021
1153	"The "Out with the Demons" Beans"; Transliteration: "Oni wa Soto Bīnzu" (Japanese: 鬼は外ビーンズ)	Katsuya Oshima	Teruko Utsumi	January 30, 2021
1154	"The House Became a Robot"; Transliteration: "Ie ga Robotto ni Natta" (Japanese: 家がロボットになった)	Katsuya Oshima	Shimizu East	January 30, 2021
1155	"The Mystery of Yamaoku Village"; Transliteration: "Yama oku Mura no kai Jiken" (Japanese: 山おく村の怪事件)	Takuya Fujikura	Shimizu East	February 6, 2021
1156	"Territory War Evading Gun"; Transliteration: "Sōdatsusen kaihi Jū" (Japanese: 争奪戦回避銃)	Yumeko Iwaoka	Teruko Utsumi	February 6, 2021
1157	"Snowy Mountain is Coming"; Transliteration: "Dai yukiyama ga Yattekita" (Japanese: 大雪山がやってきた)	Hideji Saito	Takahiro Nagano	February 13, 2021
1158	"Explosion Sticker"; Transliteration: "Chikutakubonwappen" (Japanese: チクタクボンワッペン)	Tsunataro Miyake	Shimizu East	February 13, 2021
1159	"Use the Favour Box to Go Winter Camping"; Transliteration: "Okonomibokkusu de Fuyu Kyanpu" (Japanese: オコノミボックスで冬キャンプ)	Tsunataro Miyake	Kimihito Ito	February 20, 2021
1160	"Making a Little Brother"; Transliteration: "Otōto o Tsukurō" (Japanese: 弟をつくろう)	Hideji Saito	Takahiro Nagano	February 20, 2021
1161	"Dora's Brother & Sister Quarrel"; Transliteration: "Doradora Kyōdaigenka" (Japanese: ドラドラ兄妹げんか)	Aya Kobayashi	Suzuki Yosuke	February 27, 2021
1162	"Happy Lucky Planet"; Transliteration: "Shiawase no o Hoshi Sama" (Japanese: しあわせのお星さま)	Satsukime Yuusaku	Suzuki Yosuke	February 27, 2021
1163	"Calling Spirit Bvlgari"; Transliteration: "Seireiyo Bidashiudewa" (Japanese: 精霊よびだしうでわ)	Yoshiyuki Shirahata	Kimihito Ito	March 6, 2021
1164	"Model Letter Pen"; Transliteration: "Mo han Tegami Pen" (Japanese: もはん手紙ペン)	Tsunataro Miyake	Yumi Igarashi	March 6, 2021
1165	"Cherish the Same Ideals and Follow the Same Path! Like Attracts Like Flute"; Transliteration: "Nitamono! Atsumare hoissuru" (Japanese: 似たもの！あつまれホイッスル)	Katsuya Oshima	Takahiro Nagano	March 13, 2021
1166	"Look at Doraemon! His Secret"; Transliteration: "Doraemon o nozoicha E !" (Japanese: ドラえもんをのぞいちゃえ!)	Ikuno Yagi	Kimihito Ito	March 13, 2021
1167	"Use Parasitics Tree to Run Away From Home Happily"; Transliteration: "Yadorigi de Tanoshiku Iede" (Japanese: やどり木で楽しく家出)	Katsuya Oshima	Suzuki Yosuke	March 20, 2021
1168	"Nobita's Shooting Stars"; Transliteration: "Nobita no Nagareboshi" (Japanese: のび太の流れ星)	Shigeo Koshi	Kimihito Ito	March 20, 2021
1169	"Goda Delivery"; Transliteration: "Tsuyoshi ta, Itsu ？" (Japanese: 剛田、いつ？)	Hideji Saito	Shimizu East	March 27, 2021
1170	"I'll Be My Own Teacher"; Transliteration: "Boku o, Boku no Sensei Ni" (Japanese: ぼくを、ぼくの先生に)	Hideji Saito	Teruko Utsumi	March 27, 2021
1171	"Cherry Blossom Blooming Roommates"; Transliteration: "Sakura-ippai dai sakusen" (Japanese: サクラいっぱい大作戦)	Yumeko Iwaoka	Takahiro Nagano	April 3, 2021
1172	"Overstate Personal File"; Transliteration: "Purofīru o Mocchae ！" (Japanese: プロフィールを盛っちゃえ！)	Aya Kobayashi	Suzuki Yosuke	April 3, 2021
1173	"Gigi Island Murgul Hunter"; Transliteration: "Jiji tō no Kaigyo Hantā" (Japanese: ジジ島の怪魚ハンター)	Tomokazu Ujiie	Kimihito Ito	April 10, 2021
1174	"Associated Inference Magnifier"; Transliteration: "Rensōshiki Suiri Mushi Megane" (Japanese: 連想式推理蟲メガネ)	Tsunataro Miyake	Teruko Utsumi	April 17, 2021
1175	"Accelerating Spring"; Transliteration: "Neji Maite Hassuru！" (Japanese: ネジまいてハッスル！)	Tsunataro Miyake	Kimihito Ito	April 17, 2021
1176	"Nobita is a Riddle Guessing King"; Transliteration: "Nobita wa Kuizuō" (Japanese: のび太はクイズ王)	Shigeo Koshi	Shimizu East	April 24, 2021
1177	"The Taste Seasoning of the Human World"; Transliteration: "Ningenmi Chōmiryō" (Japanese: 人間味調味料)	Hiroki Imamura	Naohiro Fukushima	April 24, 2021
1178	"The Pet is Carp Flag"; Transliteration: "Petto wa koi nobori" (Japanese: ペットはこいのぼり)	Satsukime Yuusaku	Shimizu East	May 1, 2021
1179	"The Millionaire Straw"; Transliteration: "Chōjawarashibe" (Japanese: チョージャワラシベ)	Soichiro Zen	Yuya Takahashi	May 1, 2021
1180	"Hawaii is Coming"; Transliteration: "Hawai ga Yattekuru" (Japanese: ハワイがやってくる)	Katsuya Oshima	Takahiro Nagano	May 8, 2021
1181	"Mother's Day Won't Over"; Transliteration: "Haha no Hi wa Owaranai" (Japanese: 母の日は終わらない)	Katsuya Oshima	Kimihito Ito	May 8, 2021
1182	"Famous Painting Costs 6000 Dollars"; Transliteration: "Kono e Roku zero zero zero Man En" (Japanese: この絵６０００万円)	Hideji Saito	Suzuki Yosuke	May 15, 2021
1183	"Delay Candy"; Transliteration: "Osoda Ame" (Japanese: おそだアメ)	Hideji Saito	Takahiro Nagano	May 15, 2021
1184	"Many Requests Doll Playing"; Transliteration: "Chūmon No ōi Ningyō Asobi" (Japanese: 注文の多い人形あそび)	Norio Kashima	Shimizu East	May 22, 2021
1185	"The Cute Rock Story"; Transliteration: "Kawaī Ishikoro no Hanashi" (Japanese: かわいい石ころの話)	Norio Kashima	Takahiro Nagano	May 22, 2021
1186	"Need to Be Careful of Wink"; Transliteration: "Me jikara Ni go Yōjin" (Japanese: 目ヂカラにご用心)	Shigeo Koshi	Teruko Utsumi	May 29, 2021
1187	"The Rewarding Headband"; Transliteration: "Asekkakin" (Japanese: アセッカキン)	Suzuki Daiji	Shimizu East	May 29, 2021
1188	"Use Multiple Techniques to Create the Superman Nobita"; Transliteration: "Baransu chūnyū" (Japanese: クロマキーでノビちゃんマン)	Tsunataro Miyake	Takahiro Nagano	June 5, 2021
1189	"Go to Dandelion Sky"; Transliteration: "Tanpopo Sora O Iku" (Japanese: タンポポ空を行く)	Tsunataro Miyake	Teruko Utsumi	June 5, 2021
1190	"Strengthening Focus on Attention Bubble Helmet"; Transliteration: "Shūchūryoku Zōkyō Shabon Herumetto" (Japanese: 集中力増強シャボンヘルメット)	Satsukime Yuusaku	Shimizu East	June 12, 2021
1191	"The Gawara Demon"; Transliteration: "Gawaraoni" (Japanese: ガワラオニ)	Soichiro Zen	Yuya Takahashi	June 12, 2021
1192	"Drinking the Adventure Tea on Father's Day" (Japanese: 父の日にアドベン茶)	Shigeo Koshi	Eizo Kobayashi	June 19, 2021
1193	"Preparing Hated Exam Hardly"; Transliteration: "Na tesuto Ni Ga ～ Nba！" (Japanese: キライなテストにガ～ンバ！)	Aya Kobayashi	Kimihito Ito	June 19, 2021
1194	"Locking Hammer"; Transliteration: "Rokku Rokku Hanmā" (Japanese: ロックロックハンマー)	Katsuya Oshima	Suzuki Yosuke	June 26, 2021
1195	"Forebode Insect"; Transliteration: "yo kanchū" (Japanese: よかん虫)	Norio Kashima	Shimizu East	June 26, 2021
1196	"Rare Animal is Coming to Stay"; Transliteration: "Chinjū ga Shōtosutei" (Japanese: 珍獣がショートステイ)	Hideji Saito	Shimizu East	July 3, 2021
1197	"Changing Smoothly! The Weather Box"; Transliteration: "Hengen jizai ！ o Tenki Bokkusu" (Japanese: 変幻自在！お天気ボックス)	Norio Kashima	Kimihito Ito	July 3, 2021
1198	"Using the Eraser to Erase the Face"; Transliteration: "Keshigomu de Nopperabō" (Japanese: 消しゴムでノッペラボウ)	Tsunataro Miyake	Kimihito Ito	July 10, 2021
1199	"Let's Make the Parlor Aquarium!"; Transliteration: "Tsukurō！ O Zashiki Suizokukan" (Japanese: つくろう！おざしき水族館)	Satsukime Yuusaku	Teruko Utsumi	July 10, 2021
1200	"Instant Shape Signs"; Transliteration: "Sugupikutoguramu" (Japanese: スグピクトグラム)	Hideji Saito	Kimihito Ito	July 17, 2021
1201	"Watching the Sports Match on the Cloud Sofa!"; Transliteration: "Kumo sofā De Supōtsu o Miyō ！" (Japanese: 雲ソファーでスポーツをみよう！)	Katsuya Oshima	Shimizu East	July 17, 2021
1202	"All Alone in the City of the Future"; Transliteration: "Mirai no Machi ni Tada ichi Nin" (Japanese: 未来の町にただ一人)	Zen Soichiro	Shimizu East	July 31, 2021
1203	"How Would the Entrusting Bee Be"; Transliteration: "Hachi ni Tanomeba nantoka Narusa" (Japanese: ハチにたのめば何とかなるさ)	Suzuki Daiji	Teruko Utsumi	July 31, 2021
1204	"Sleeping Power! Nobita Electric Power Company"; Transliteration: "Nemutte hatsuden! Nobita denryoku" (Japanese: 眠って発電！のび太電力)	Tsunataro Miyake	Kimihito Ito	August 7, 2021
1205	"Courage Testing Glasses"; Transliteration: "Ki mo dame shi megane" (Japanese: きもだめしめがね)	Takami Doyama	Suzuki Yosuke	August 7, 2021
1206	"A Cat Made a Company, Meow"; Transliteration: "Neko ga kaisha o tsukutta nya" (Japanese: ネコが会かい社しゃを作つくったニャ)	Hideji Saito	Shimizu East	August 14, 2021
1207	"The Three-Dimensional Puzzle Hammer"; Transliteration: "Rittai pazuruhanmā" (Japanese: 立体パズルハンマー)	Yoshihiko Iwata	Eizo Kobayashi	August 14, 2021
1208	"Comprehensive Ghosts and Monsters Can"; Transliteration: "Tsumeawaseobake" (Japanese: つめあわせオバケ)	Hideji Saito	Kimihito Ito	August 21, 2021
1209	"The Wishing Star"; Transliteration: "Negai Boshi" (Japanese: ねがい星ぼし)	Tsunataro Miyake	Naohiro Fukushima	August 21, 2021
1210	"Use Light in Rhyme to Go Camping"; Transliteration: "Goroawasetou de kyanpu shiyou!" (Japanese: ゴロアワセトウでキャンプしよう！)	Tsunataro Miyake	Suzuki Yosuke	August 28, 2021
1211	"Robinson Crusoe Set"; Transliteration: "Robinson Kurūsō setto" (Japanese: ロビンソンクルーソーセット)	Shigeo Koshi	Suzuki Yosuke	August 28, 2021
1212	"Nobita's Dinosaur"; Transliteration: "Nobita no Kyoryu" (Japanese: のび太の恐竜)	Katsuya Oshima	-	September 4, 2021
1213	"Dora-yaki Disappearing Day"; Transliteration: "Dora-yaki ga kieta hi" (Japanese: どら焼きが消えた日)	Minoru Yamaoka	Teruko Utsumi	September 4, 2021
1214	"Magic Usage"; Transliteration: "Majikku no tsukaimichi" (Japanese: マジックの使い道)	Katsuya Oshima	Suzuki Yosuke	September 4, 2021
1215	"Nobita's Planet Searching Mission"; Transliteration: "Nobita no wakusei tansa misshon" (Japanese: のび太の惑星探査ミッション)	Shigeo Koshi	Teruko Utsumi	September 4, 2021
1216	"The Long, Slender Friend"; Transliteration: "Hosoku nagai tomodachi" (Japanese: 細く長い友だち)	Norio Kashima	Suzuki Yosuke	September 11, 2021
1217	"Returning to the Owner Spray"; Transliteration: "Otoshimono kamubakkusupurē" (Japanese: 落としものカムバックスプレー)	Norio Kashima	Kimihito Ito	September 11, 2021
1218	"Moonlight and Bug Voices"; Transliteration: "Tsuki no hikari to mushi no koe" (Japanese: 月の光と虫の声)	Aya Kobayashi	Kimihito Ito	September 18, 2021
1219	"Entering Dream Gun"; Transliteration: "Tsumorigan" (Japanese: ツモリガン)	Katsuya Oshima	Kimihito Ito	September 18, 2021
1220	"Nikmenine"; Transliteration: "Nikumenain" (Japanese: ニクメナイン)	Satsukime Yuusaku	Hayato Morohashi	September 25, 2021
1221	"Suneo is the Ideal Big Brother"; Transliteration: "Suneo wa Risō no Onīsan" (Japanese: スネ夫は理想のお兄さん)	Ikuno Yagi	Suzuki Yosuke	September 25, 2021
1222	"Procrastinating With the Sooner-or-Later Chestnut"; Transliteration: "Agesagekuri" (Japanese: 上げ下げくり)	Tsunataro Miyake	Kimihito Ito	October 2, 2021
1223	"Rental Fee"; Transliteration: "Kashigiri-chippu" (Japanese: 貸し切りチップ)	Tsunataro Miyake	Kimihito Ito	October 2, 2021
1224	"The Great Battle of the Breaking Neighborhood"; Transliteration: "Chōnai toppa dai sakusen" (Japanese: 町内突破大作戦)	Tsunataro Miyake	Suzuki Yosuke	October 9, 2021
1225	"Outfit Just Give it to Capanna"; Transliteration: "Kōdinēto wa sunekapa de" (Japanese: コーディネートはスネカパで)	Aya Kobayashi	Shimizu East	October 9, 2021
1226	"Super Exciting! Grand Racing on the Ever-Changing Track"; Transliteration: "Suriru manten! Irekae kōsu de mō rēsu" (Japanese: スリル満点！いれかえコースで猛レース)	Tsukushiyama	Hayato Morohashi	October 16, 2021
1227	"Tidying Things Showing Room"; Transliteration: "O katadzuke shōrūmu" (Japanese: おかたづけショールーム)	Tomokazu Ujiie	Shimizu East	October 16, 2021
1228	"Master Honekawa's Do It Yourself!"; Transliteration: "Hone kawa maisutā no Do It yuaserufu" (Japanese: 骨川マイスターのDo It Yourself！)	Shigeo Koshi	Shimizu East	October 23, 2021
1229	"The Leading Role Inset Machine"; Transliteration: "Shuyakuhamekomiki" (Japanese: 主役はめこみ機)	Tomokazu Ujiie	Mizuno Munenori	October 23, 2021
1230	"True Travelling Around Japan Express Monopoly"; Transliteration: "Riaruna nihon'isshū tokkyū sugo ro ku" (Japanese: リアルな日本一周特急すごろく)	Suzuki Daiji	Kimihito Ito	October 30, 2021
1231	"The Continuation Spray"; Transliteration: "Tsudzuki supurē" (Japanese: つづきスプレー)	Hideji Saito	Takahiro Nagano	November 6, 2021
1232	"Let's Exercise the Baseball!"; Transliteration: "Yakyū de undō shiyou!" (Japanese: 野球で運動しよう！)	Hideji Saito	Hayato Morohashi	November 6, 2021
1233	"Nobody Land Drink"; Transliteration: "Nōbadirandodorinku" (Japanese: ノーバディランドドリンク)	Katsuya Oshima	Hayato Morohashi	November 13, 2021
1234	"Nobita the Leaf Detective"; Transliteration: "Konoha tantei Nobita" (Japanese: 木の葉探偵のび太)	Satsukime Yuusaku	Naohiro Fukushima	November 13, 2021
1235	"Nobita and Nobita"; Transliteration: "Nobita to Nobita" (Japanese: のび太とのび太)	Satsukime Yuusaku	Kimihito Ito	November 20, 2021
1236	"The Lie Speaker"; Transliteration: "Uso no hanashite" (Japanese: 嘘の話し手)	Satsukime Yuusaku	Sato Dai	November 20, 2021
1237	"Broad Japan"; Transliteration: "Hiroi Nihon" (Japanese: 広い日本)	Tsunataro Miyake	Suzuki Yosuke	November 27, 2021
1238	"Rebuild the Battered Inn"; Transliteration: "Boroboro no ryokan o saiken suru" (Japanese: ボロボロの旅館を再建する)	Tsunataro Miyake	Aiuchi Mio	November 27, 2021
1239	"Doraemon and Perman's Close Call"; Transliteration: "Doraemon to pāman kikiippatsu" (Japanese: ドラえもん＆パーマン危機一髪！？)	Yoshihiro Osugi	Mitsuru Shimada	December 4, 2021
1240	"Prophecy: The End of the Earth"; Transliteration: "Dai yogen chikyū no horobiru hi" (Japanese: 大予言・地球の滅びる日)	Tomokazu Ujiie	Kimihito Ito	December 4, 2021
1241	"Trouble Marke's Tail"; Transliteration: "Harī no shippo" (Japanese: ハリーのしっぽ)	Soichiro Zen	Hayato Morohash	December 11, 2021
1242	"Nobita in the Poster"; Transliteration: "Posutā no naka no Nobita" (Japanese: ポスターの中ののび太)	Tsukushiyama	Shimizu East	December 11, 2021
1243	"Gian's Ramen is Coming!"; Transliteration: "Jaian no rāmen ga yattekuru!" (Japanese: ジャイアンのラーメンがやってくる！)	Tsunataro Miyake	Kimihito Ito	December 18, 2021
1244	"Electric Shocking Jumper"; Transliteration: "Kanden janpā" (Japanese: 感電ジャンパー)	Arai Miho	Suzuki Yosuke	December 18, 2021
1245	"Plant Pen"; Transliteration: "Purantopen" (Japanese: プラントペン)	Suzuki Daiji	Shimizu East	December 25, 2021
1246	"Magician Nobita's Christmas Miracle"; Transliteration: "Iryūjonisutonobī ~ kurisumasu no kiseki" (Japanese: イリュージョニストノビー～クリスマスの奇跡)	Tsunataro Miyake	Kimihito Ito	December 25, 2021
1247	"Get Rid of Troubles!"; Transliteration: "Toraburu o kaishō shimashou!" (Japanese: トラブルを解消しましょう！)	Shigeo Koshi	Teruko Utsumi	December 31, 2021
1248	"Goodbye, Doraemon"; Transliteration: "Sayounara Doraemon" (Japanese: さようならドラえもん)	Masato Sato and Tsunataro Miyake	Nobuyuki Fujimoto	December 31, 2021

== 2022 ==
No.	Title	Directed by	Written by	Original release date
1249	"Gian is a Policeman!?"; Transliteration: "Jaian wa keisatsukan!?" (Japanese: ジャイアンは警察官!?)	Yukiyo Teramoto	Shimizu East	January 8, 2022
1250	"Suneo's Pride is Everybody's Pride"; Transliteration: "Suneotto no puraido wa min'na no puraido" (Japanese: スネ夫のプライドはみんなのプライド)	Tomokazu Ujiie	Hayato Morohashi	January 8, 2022
1251	"Walking in the Clouds"; Transliteration: "Kumo no naka o aruku" (Japanese: 雲の中を歩く)	Norio Kashima	Teruko Utsumi	January 15, 2022
1252	"Anytime Diary"; Transliteration: "Itsudemonikki" (Japanese: いつでも日記)	Norio Kashima	Kimihito Ito	January 15, 2022
1253	"Calling for Anything in TV Adhesive"; Transliteration: "Terebi no setchaku-zainara nani demo o makase kudasai" (Japanese: テレビの接着剤なら何でもお任せください)	Tsunataro Miyake	Takahiro Nagano	January 22, 2022
1254	"Tiring Ointment"; Transliteration: "Tsukareru nankō" (Japanese: 疲れる軟膏)	Katsuya Oshima	Kimihito Ito	January 22, 2022
1255	"Let's Change the Alphabet to Play"; Transliteration: "Arufabetto o kaete asobou" (Japanese: アルファベットを変えて遊ぼう)	Tsunataro Miyake	Teruko Utsumi	January 29, 2022
1256	"The Strange Encounter Machine"; Transliteration: "Kimyōna sōgū mashin" (Japanese: 奇妙な遭遇マシン)	Shigenori Awai	Teruko Utsumi	January 29, 2022
1257	"Playing Skateboard in Lunar Craters!"; Transliteration: "Tsuki no kurētā de sukētobōdo de asobou!" (Japanese: 月のクレーターでスケートボードで遊ぼう！)	Tomokazu Ujiie	Shimizu East	February 5, 2022
1258	"Fortune Telling Through Tongue Reading!"; Transliteration: "Shita yomi de uranaimasu!" (Japanese: 舌読みで占います！)	Aya Kobayashi	Hayato Morohashi	February 5, 2022
1259	"Shooting the Graffiti!"; Transliteration: "Gurafiti o satsuei shiyou!" (Japanese: グラフィティを撮影しよう！)	Tsukushiyama	Kimihito Ito	February 12, 2022
1260	"Honest Tāro"; Transliteration: "Shōjikina Taro" (Japanese: 正直なタロ)	Park Kyung Seung	Hayato Morohash	February 12, 2022
1261	"Giving Back the Painful Mirror"; Transliteration: "Itamashī kagami o kaesu" (Japanese: 痛ましい鏡を返す)	Shigeo Koshi	Shimizu East	February 19, 2022
1262	"A Roasted Sweet Potato's Feelings"; Transliteration: "Yakiimo no kimochi" (Japanese: 焼き芋の気持ち)	Tsunataro Miyake	Shimizu East	February 19, 2022
1263	"Level Crossing Set"; Transliteration: "Fumikiri setto" (Japanese: 踏切セット)	Yukiyo Teramoto	Kimihito Ito	February 26, 2022
1264	"Cartoonist Jaiko"; Transliteration: "Mangakka jai-ko" (Japanese: 漫画家ジャイ子)	Park Kyung Seung	Teruko Utsumi	February 26, 2022
-	"Doraemon: Nobita's New Dinosaur"	Kazuaki Imai	Genki Kawamura	February 26, 2022
1265	"Hoi of the Donjara Village"; Transliteration: "Donjara-mura no hoi" (Japanese: ドンジャラ村のホイ)	Tsunataro Miyake	Kimihito Ito	March 5, 2022
1266	"Dorami's Flower Viewing Melon Bread"; Transliteration: "Dorami-chan no o hanami meronpan" (Japanese: ドラミちゃんのお花見メロンパン)	Katsuya Oshima	Shimizu East	March 12, 2022
1267	"The Bow-Bow Grasshopper"; Transliteration: "Bouboubatta" (Japanese: ボウボウバッタ)	Katsuya Oshima	Hayato Morohashi	March 12, 2022
1268	"Catching the Dream! Treasure Planet"; Transliteration: "Yume o tsukamou! Torejāpuranetto" (Japanese: 夢を掴もう！トレジャープラネット)	Minoru Yamaoka	Teruko Utsumi	March 19, 2022
1269	"The Lying Machine"; Transliteration: "Yokotawaru kikai" (Japanese: 横たわる機械)	Tsunataro Miyake	Kimihito Ito	March 26, 2022
1270	"Don't Cry, Jaiko"; Transliteration: "Nakanaide, jaiko" (Japanese: 泣かないで、ジャイコ)	Shigenori Awai	Teruko Utsumi	March 26, 2022
1271	"Getting Slim with Shaping Clays"; Transliteration: "Sheipukurei de surimu ni naru" (Japanese: シェイプクレイでスリムになる)	Tomokazu Ujiie	Teruko Utsumi	April 2, 2022
1272	"Retrieving Rope"; Transliteration: "Rōpu no kaishū" (Japanese: ロープの回収)	Tomokazu Ujiie	Hayato Morohashi	April 2, 2022
1273	"Sucker Coin"; Transliteration: "Sakkākoin" (Japanese: サッカーコイン)	Shigeo Koshi	Kimihito Ito	April 9, 2022
1274	"The Dictator Switch"; Transliteration: "Dokusai-sha suitchi" (Japanese: 独裁者スイッチ)	Shigeo Kosh	Mizuno Munenori	April 9, 2022
1275	"Nobita's Cardboard Space Station"; Transliteration: "Nobita no danbōru uchū sutēshon" (Japanese: のび太のダンボール宇宙ステーション)	Atsushi Takahashi	Atsushi Takahashi	April 16, 2022
1276	"Fuko, The Typhoon"; Transliteration: "Fūko za taifūn" (Japanese: フーコ・ザ・タイフーン)	Moriyama Roucho	Kimihito Ito	April 23, 2022
1277	"Handy Auxiliary Stone"; Transliteration: "Benrina hojo ishi" (Japanese: 便利な補助石)	Shigeo Koshi	Shinya Amano	April 23, 2022
1278	"The Dora Dora Genpei Battle ~Save Yourself Shizuka-chan!~"; Transliteration: "Doradora genpeigassen ~ shizukachan sukue!~" (Japanese: ドラドラ源平合戦 ～しずかちゃん救え！～)	Hirofumi Ogura	Kimihito Ito	April 30, 2022
1279	"Listen to Mom on Mother's Day"; Transliteration: "Haha no hi ni okāsan no hanashi o kiitekudasai" (Japanese: 母の日にお母さんの話を聞いてください)	Tsunataro Miyake	Teruko Utsumi	May 7, 2022
1280	"Perspective Desire Gun"; Transliteration: "Pāsupekutibu dezaia gan" (Japanese: パースペクティブ・デザイア・ガン)	Aya Kobayashi	Kimihito Ito	May 7, 2022
1281	"The Devil Card"; Transliteration: "Akuma no kādo" (Japanese: 悪魔のカード)	Yukiyo Teramoto	Kimihito Ito	May 14, 2022
1282	"As Seen Painter Hat"; Transliteration: "Mita mama no peintāhatto" (Japanese: 見たままのペインターハット)	Unknown	Unknown	May 14, 2022
1283	"We're Gonna Steal Mom's Diamond"; Transliteration: "Mama no daiyamondo o nusumu nda" (Japanese: ママのダイヤモンドを盗むんだ)	Unknown	Unknown	May 21, 2022
1284	"Shizuka-chan in My Pocket"; Transliteration: "Poketto no naka no shizukachan" (Japanese: ポケットの中のしずかちゃん)	Unknown	Unknown	May 21, 2022
1285	"Map Syringe"; Transliteration: "Mappushirinji" (Japanese: マップシリンジ)	Unknown	Unknown	May 28, 2022
1286	"Weight Manipulating Light"; Transliteration: "Taijū o sōsa suru raito" (Japanese: 体重を操作するライト)	Unknown	Unknown	May 28, 2022
1287	"Personality Transferring Mole"; Transliteration: "Jinkaku ten'i mōru" (Japanese: 人格転移モール)	Unknown	Unknown	June 4, 2022
1288	"Rebellion of the Computer Pills"; Transliteration: "Konpyūtāpiruzu no hanran" (Japanese: コンピューターピルズの反乱)	Unknown	Unknown	June 4, 2022
1289	"Lovely Gian"; Transliteration: "Raburījaian" (Japanese: ラブリージャイアン)	Unknown	Unknown	June 11, 2022
1290	"Singer Creating"; Transliteration: "Kashu no sakusei" (Japanese: 歌手の作成)	Unknown	Unknown	June 11, 2022
1291	"Tree Frog Energy Drink"; Transliteration: "Amagaeru enajīdorinku" (Japanese: アマガエル エナジードリンク)	Unknown	Unknown	June 18, 2022
1292	"The Tracking Mirror"; Transliteration: "Tsuiseki mirā" (Japanese: 追跡ミラー)	Unknown	Unknown	June 18, 2022
1293	"Gian in Hell"; Transliteration: "Jigoku no jaian" (Japanese: 地獄のジャイアン)	Unknown	Unknown	June 25, 2022
1294	"News Publisher Game"; Transliteration: "Nyūsupaburisshāgēmu" (Japanese: ニュースパブリッシャーゲーム)	Unknown	Unknown	June 25, 2022
1295	"I've Got a Spare Fourth Dimensional Pocket"; Transliteration: "Yobi no yojigenpoketto o motte imasu" (Japanese: 予備の四次元ポケットを持っています)	Unknown	Unknown	July 2, 2022
1296	"Who Is Lying! Change Opinion Gun"; Transliteration: "Dare ga uso o tsuite iru no ka! Iken o kaeru jū" (Japanese: 誰が嘘をついているのか！意見を変える銃)	Unknown	Unknown	July 2, 2022
1297	"I Caught a Sea Monster!"; Transliteration: "Umi no kaibutsu o tsukamaeta!" (Japanese: 海の怪物を捕まえた！)	Unknown	Unknown	July 9, 2022
1298	"The Snail House Sure is Carefree"; Transliteration: "Katatsumuri no ie wa tashika ni kimamadesu" (Japanese: カタツムリの家は確かに気ままです)	Unknown	Unknown	July 9, 2022
1299	"It is as Powerful as Dekisugi Becomes Smaller"; Transliteration: "Shutsu kisugi ga chīsaku natta no to onaji kurai tsuyoi" (Japanese: 出木杉が小さくなったのと同じくらい強い)	Unknown	Unknown	July 16, 2022
1300	"Even Though It's Inside the Stomach Acid"; Transliteration: "Isan no nakananoni" (Japanese: 胃酸の中なのに)	Unknown	Unknown	July 16, 2022
1301	"Go Hiking"; Transliteration: "Haikingu ni iku" (Japanese: ハイキングに行く)	Unknown	Unknown	July 23, 2022
1302	"Fujin Disturbance"; Transliteration: "Fūjin sōdō" (Japanese: 風神騒動)	Unknown	Unknown	July 23, 2022
1303	"But, I Saw a Ghost!"; Transliteration: "Demo, yūrei o mita!" (Japanese: でも、幽霊を見た!)	Unknown	Unknown	July 30, 2022
1304	"Nobita's Son Ran Away From Home"; Transliteration: "Nobita no musuko ga iede shita" (Japanese: のび太の息子が家出した)	Unknown	Unknown	August 6, 2022
1305	"Dream Wind Chime"; Transliteration: "Yume no fūrin" (Japanese: 夢の風鈴)	Unknown	Unknown	August 6, 2022
1306	"Winning Back Shizuka-chan"; Transliteration: "Shizukachan o torimodosu" (Japanese: しずかちゃんを取り戻す)	Unknown	Unknown	August 13, 2022
1307	"Switching Gun"; Transliteration: "Suitchingugan" (Japanese: スイッチングガン)	Unknown	Unknown	August 13, 2022
1308	"Please! Animal Ring"; Transliteration: "Onegaishimasu! Animaruringu" (Japanese: お願いします！アニマルリング)	Unknown	Unknown	August 20, 2022
1309	"Punish in Punishment!"; Transliteration: "Batsu ni wa batsu o!" (罰には罰を！)	Unknown	Unknown	August 20, 2022
1310	TBA	Unknown	Unknown	August 27, 2022
1311	TBA	Unknown	Unknown	August 27, 2022
1312	TBA	Unknown	Unknown	September 3, 2022
1313	TBA	Unknown	Unknown	September 3, 2022
1314	TBA	Unknown	Unknown	September 3, 2022
1315	TBA	Unknown	Unknown	September 3, 2022
1316	TBA	Unknown	Unknown	September 10, 2022
1317	TBA	Unknown	Unknown	September 10, 2022
1318	TBA	Unknown	Unknown	September 17, 2022
1319	TBA	Unknown	Unknown	September 17, 2022
1320	TBA	Unknown	Unknown	September 24, 2022
1321	TBA	Unknown	Unknown	September 24, 2022
1322	TBA	Unknown	Unknown	October 1, 2022
1323	TBA	Unknown	Unknown	October 1, 2022
1324	TBA	Unknown	Unknown	October 8, 2022
1325	TBA	Unknown	Unknown	October 8, 2022
1326	TBA	Unknown	Unknown	October 15, 2022
1327	TBA	Unknown	Unknown	October 15, 2022
1328	TBA	Unknown	Unknown	October 22, 2022
1329	TBA	Unknown	Unknown	October 22, 2022
1330	TBA	Unknown	Unknown	October 29, 2022
1331	TBA	Unknown	Unknown	October 29, 2022
1332	TBA	Unknown	Unknown	November 5, 2022
1333	TBA	Unknown	Unknown	November 5, 2022
1334	TBA	Unknown	Unknown	November 12, 2022
1335	TBA	Unknown	Unknown	November 12, 2022
1336	TBA	Unknown	Unknown	November 19, 2022
1337	TBA	Unknown	Unknown	November 19, 2022
1338	TBA	Unknown	Unknown	December 3, 2022
1339	TBA	Unknown	Unknown	December 3, 2022
1340	TBA	Unknown	Unknown	December 10, 2022
1341	TBA	Unknown	Unknown	December 10, 2022
1342	TBA	Unknown	Unknown	December 17, 2022
1343	TBA	Unknown	Unknown	December 17, 2022
1344	TBA	Unknown	Unknown	December 24, 2022
1345	TBA	Unknown	Unknown	December 24, 2022
1346	TBA	Unknown	Unknown	December 31, 2022
1347	TBA	Unknown	Unknown	December 31, 2022

== Dora Dora Mini Theater ==
Similar to Doraemon Mini Theater, Dora Dora Mini Theater contains nine short segments that were broadcast from October to December 2022, between the ending credits and the preview for the following episode.

No.	Title	Directed by	Original release date
1	"Bichijimi Cup With All Contents"; Transliteration: "Nakami-goto nobi chidjimi kappu" (Japanese: 中身ごとのびちぢみカップ)	Yumeko Iwaoka	October 1, 2022
2	"Chameleon Tea"; Transliteration: "Kamereontī" (Japanese: カメレオンティー)	Takuya Fujikura	October 8, 2022
3	"Weight Inhalation"; Transliteration: "Taijū kyūnyū" (Japanese: 体重吸入)	Kobe Yuta	October 15, 2022
4	"Real Scissors"; Transliteration: "Honmono no hasami" (Japanese: 本物のはさみ)	Yumeko Iwaoka	October 22, 2022
5	"Radio Controlled"; Transliteration: "Honmono no hasami" (Japanese: 本物のはさみ)	Hiroyuki Moriyama	October 29, 2022
6	"Image Beret"; Transliteration: "Imējiberē-bō" (Japanese: イメージベレー帽)	Hiroyuki Moriyama	November 19, 2022
7	"Big Chinki"; Transliteration: "Bigguchinki" (Japanese: ビッグチンキ)	Hirofumi Ogura	November 26, 2022
8	"Complete Restoration"; Transliteration: "Kanzen'na shūfuku" (Japanese: 完全な修復)	Yumeko Iwaoka	December 3, 2022
9	"Marionette"; Transliteration: "Marionetto" (Japanese: マリオネット)	Moriyama Roucho	December 10, 2022
