= Nobuaki Sekine =

Japanese voice actor (1934–2021)

Nobuaki Sekine (関根 信昭, Sekine Nobuaki, 1 January 1934 – 19 November 2021) was a Japanese voice actor.

== Notable voice roles ==
=== Anime ===
- Animation Kikou Marco Polo no Boken as Varieties
- Avenger as Old Man
- Case Closed as Shitara
- Code Geass: Lelouch of the Rebellion R2 as Gaohai (eps 1 - 3)
- Gintama as Superior (Ep. 84–85)
- Heat Guy J as Mauro
- Kimba the White Lion as Kenichi
- Master Keaton as Andy (ep 23); Tonio (ep 2)
- Noein - to your other self as Professor Sasaki (ep 10, 18)
- Pénélope tête en l'air as Grandpa
- Rainbow Sentai Robin as Pegasus

=== OVA ===
- .hack//Liminality as Kyoko's Father (ep 3)
- 801 T.T.S. Airbats as Colonel Yumioka
- Bubblegum Crash as Foreman (Ep 3)
- Genesis Survivor Gaiarth (Ep 2)

=== Movies ===
- Alakazam the Great as Sanzo-hoshi
- Doraemon: Nobita's Space Heroes as Grandpa
