= Rainbow Sentai Robin =

Japanese anime and manga series

レインボー戦隊ロビン
- Genre: Action, adventure, science fiction
- Created by: Studio Zero
- Manga
- Written by: Shotaro Ishinomori
- Published by: Kodansha
- Magazine: Weekly Shōnen Magazine
- Original run: January, 1965 – March, 1965
- Volumes: 1
- Anime television series
- Directed by: Shinichi Suzuki; Takeshi Tamiya (episode director)
- Music by: Kouichi Hattori
- Studio: Toei Animation; Studio Zero
- Original network: NET
- Original run: April 23, 1966 – March 24, 1967
- Episodes: 48

Rainbow Sentai Robin (Japanese: レインボー戦隊ロビン, Hepburn: Reinbō Sentai Robin; lit. 'Rainbow Squadron Robin') is an anime and manga created by Shotaro Ishinomori and his manga/anime studio Studio Zero. It is the first anime to feature a 5-unit superhero team with the anime series produced by Toei Animation. The series was also broadcast in Germany, Spain, and France. Hayao Miyazaki was a key animator on episodes 34 and 38.

It was announced by the Ishinomori website that a new Rainbow Sentai Robin graphic novel is to launch on Summer 2020.

== Plot ==
A distant planet, far off in space named Palta is facing the doom of extinction. There are only two years left until their ultimate demise. Palta looks to Earth to cultivate resources and begins attacking it in hopes of taking over. Earth turns to a boy named Robin, who owns many robots. Robin's father is an alien from Palta who was sent to Earth as a spy, but fell in love with a human. Robin's father, Dr. Polto, and mother, Sumiko, are forcibly taken back to Palta, but his father makes numerous robots for him before they leave. The robots are named Lili, Wolf, Benkei, Pegasus, Professor, and Bell, and all have unique superpowers of sorts.

== Characters ==
- Robin (ロビン) (Voiced by: Kyoko Satomi)

The leader of the sentai team. Robin is half Palta alien and half human. His main weapon is a ray gun.

- Lili (リリ) (Voiced by: Noriko Shindou)

A human-looking nurse robot. She is a stereotypical sweet woman who fills a motherly role in Robin's life.

- Wolf (ウルフ)(Voiced by: Eiichi Sakurai)

Possesses super-speed and super-accurate aiming abilities. He can change into a human-like form.

- Professor (教授) (Voiced by: Kousei Yagi)

Exceptionally intelligent, Professor possesses extensive scientific knowledge.

- Bell (ベル) (Voiced by: Keiko Nakamura)

She is a cat and has strong radar abilities. She can scramble enemy radars as well.

- Pegasus (ペガサス) (Voiced by: Nobuaki Sekine)

A transforming robot that can change into a rocket and fly at speeds up to Mach 18. Pegasus can also turn into a submarine as well.

- Benkei (ベンケイ) (Voiced by: Setsuo Shinoda)

The brawn of the group, is iron-strong and also has a compartment in his chest for Professor and Bell to ride in. His appearance is similar to that of many super-robos at the time.
