= Doraemon: Nobita's Space Heroes =

2015 film by Yoshihiro Osugi

Doraemon the Movie: Nobita's Space Heroes
- Theatrical release poster

Japanese name
- Kanji: ドラえもん のび太の宇宙英雄記(スペースヒーローズ)
- Literal meaning: Doraemon: Nobita's Space Heroes
Transcriptions
- Revised Hepburn: Doraemon: Nobita no Supēsu Hīrōzu
- Directed by: Yoshihiro Osugi
- Written by: Higashi Shimzu
- Based on: Doraemon by Fujiko Fujio
- Starring: Wasabi Mizuta; Megumi Ōhara; Yumi Kakazu; Tomokazu Seki; Subaru Kimura; Inoue Marina; Noto Mamiko; Yuji Tanaka; Mizuki Arisa; Masachika Ichimura; Furukawa Yutaka; Nobuaki Sekine; Soga Natsumi; Yuji Tanaka; Furuta Uta; Kotono Mitsuishi
- Music by: Kan Sawada
- Production company: Shin-Ei Animation
- Distributed by: Toho
- Release date: March 7, 2015 (Japan)
- Running time: 100 minutes
- Country: Japan
- Language: Japanese
- Box office: $36 million

Doraemon: Nobita's Space Heroes (ドラえもん のび太の宇宙英雄記(スペースヒーローズ), Doraemon: Nobita no Supēsu Hīrōzu), also known as Doraemon The Super Star 2015 and Doraemon the Movie 35th, is an anime science fiction action adventure film and the 35th Doraemon film. Released in Japan on March 7, 2015, it commemorates both the 35th anniversary of the Doraemon feature films and the 10th anniversary of the 2005 Doraemon television series.

== Plot ==
In the introduction scenario, a space ship crashes into the hill at dark night. The next morning, Suneo, Gian and Shizuka decide to make a space-based hero film entitled Guardians of the Galaxy, which is a current magical blockbuster hit.

Meanwhile, Nobita performs some rubber band art in front of a group of little kids. Afterwards, Nobita jumps and says "急げ!" and the theme song, "Yume wo Kanaete Doraemon" begins. After the opening, Nobita heads on over to the hill where he finds Gian, Suneo and Shizuka shooting the film. Nobita immediately wants to join in the film as a space hero, to which Gian and Suneo let him in, only to end up making Nobita perform as the monster that they battle. After Gian throws and beats up Nobita dressed up as the monster, Nobita runs back home to ask Doraemon for help. The two return to the hill where Doraemon pulls out a gadget from his pocket, a film director known as the "Burger Director". They all become space heroes (using the "Real-Light" gadget, also from Doraemon's pocket that has the ability to make their fictional costumes real) and with the help from the Director Burger, they all start to actually battle a fake space monster.

During filming, an alien from another planet arrives to ask help from Doraemon, Nobita, Shizuka, Suneo, and Gian and they agreed to follow him. On the spacecraft, the alien, named Aron, reveals himself as the sheriff of the planet Pokkoru, which is inhabited by mice alien creatures. He was lucky to escape the pursuit of security personnel of "Recreation Land Space" (who are actually alien pirates). The next morning, Aron and the reconnaissance group enter Pokkoru. Aron tries to warn the councilors and public to remain alert, but no one believes him. Nobita discovers some alien pirates so they push him away, where he ends up falling down and loses his superhero star crest down in the well, ridding him of his abilities.

Fortunately, Aron finds Nobita tied by ropes and accidentally left his disguise active knowing that Space Land is sucking the energy plan of the planet to shoot down the Arumasu star. However, Aron and Nobita end up discovered by Meba, and Gian and Suneo were arrested earlier by Ogon. Shizuka, Doraemon and Nobita had seen the star drifting toward him, and they knew something was wrong so they rescue them and their friends. Although the rescue was successful, Shizuka was caught by Haido. In order to make Aron's group surrender, Haido threatens to impale her, but the Burger Director projects a virtual image in order to scare him and save Shizuka.

When all of them shelter, the group began to split and Aron finally learns the truth about Nobita and his friends not actually being heroes, but still praises the group as heroes since, despite that, they still chose to come to Pokkoru to help. The group decide to help save the planet, where they move straight to the tower group Space, while the residents of Pokkoru were unaware of their dangers. Meba and Ogon arrive to block and fight the group, while Haido and his group is in the basement below the tower. Meba attacks Aron and Nobita tries to help, but was accidentally teleported inside the pirates's ship due to the belt on Meba's waist fell against him, Shizuka then fights and defeats Meba, while Gian also defeats Ogon.

Meanwhile, Doraemon, Suneo, and Aron head towards the basement, but Haido uses his fighter to chase them away. Shizuka and Gian arrive and crash Haido's fighter, resulting in Haido getting knocked in the crash. After confronting Haido, the group learn the pirates secret to steal diamonds from the Arumasu Star. Nobita fights with Ikarosu alone, where he discovers that Ikarosu is too weak (due to unavailability of energy from graphite - a major component of the Arumasu star) and quickly defeats him.

After learning the secret out, the group returns to the ship heading to disable launchers, but they were too late because Ikarosu had already triggered it. Luckily, they stops the star explosions after the Burger Director rewinds time Pokkoru planet has not sucked the energy to restore the life on their planet. They save Pokkoru from destruction and the residents apologize to Aron for not trusting him. Later on, the group bids Aron farewell and return to Earth, where Nobita and the group of little kids are playing cat's cradle together, with Doraemon, Gian, Suneo, and Shizuka watching before they all laugh together.

== Cast ==
Character	Japanese voice actor
Doraemon	Wasabi Mizuta
Nobita Nobi	Megumi Ōhara
Shizuka Minamoto	Yumi Kakazu
Takeshi "Gian" Gōda	Subaru Kimura
Suneo Honekawa	Tomokazu Seki
Burger Director	Mamiko Noto
Aron	Marina Inoue
Hyde	Yuji Tanaka
Ogon	Yutaka Furukawa
Meba	Alisa Mizuki
Ikaros	Masachika Ichimura
Councilor	Motomu Kiyokawa
Secretary	Nobuyuki Kobushi
Grandpa	Nobuaki Sekine
Space Pirate Minions	Katsumi Toriumi; Kenji Kitamura
Children	Ai Fukada; Kanami Satō; Tomomi Tenjinbayashi; Shiori Matsuda
Tamako Nobi (Nobita's mother)	Kotono Mitsuishi
Mrs. Gōda (Takeshi's mother)	Miyako Takeuchi

== Music ==
On December 10, 2014, Japanese singer miwa announced that she would perform the ending theme song for the film. On February 25, 2015, her 17th single, the movie theme song entitled "360°", was released.

=== Theme songs ===
"Yume wo Kanaete Doraemon" (夢をかなえてドラえもん)
Lyrics and Composition: Katsuhiko Kurosu / Arrangement: Kan Sawada / Vocals: Doraemon (Wasabi Mizuta), Nobita (Megumi Ōhara), Shizuka (Yumi Kakazu), Gian (Subaru Kimura), Suneo (Tomokazu Seki) (Columbia)
"360°" (360°)
Lyrics: miwa / Composition: miwa & NAOKI-T / Arrangement: NAOKI-T / Vocals: miwa (Sony Music Records Inc.)

=== Insert songs ===
"Yume wo Kanaete Doraemon" (夢をかなえてドラえもん)
Lyrics and Composition: Katsuhiko Kurosu / Arrangement: Kan Sawada / Vocals: Suginami Children Chorus
"Ginga Boueitai Miracle" (ミラクル銀河防衛隊のテーマ)
Lyrics: Mike Sugiyama / Composition and Arrangement: Kan Sawada / Vocals: Suginami Children Chorus

== Box office ==
The film topped the Japanese box office during its opening weekend (March 7–8) earning US$5.3 million on 557,000 admissions from 365 screens. As of April 19, 2015, it had grossed (¥3.75 billion) at the Japanese box office. The film was the fifth highest-grossing Japanese film at the Japanese box office in 2015, with ¥3.93 billion (US$32.7 million). As of February 2016, the film has grossed in Japan ($32.7 million), Hong Kong ($799,043), Italy ($1,295,875), South Korea ($696,169), Taiwan ($108,560), United Arab Emirates ($69,349), Vietnam ($350,706).

Here is the box office of this film of all the weekends in Japan:

#	Rank	Weekend	Weekend gross	Total gross till current weekend
1	1	March 7–8	¥644,735,500 ($5.4 million)	¥644,735,500 ($5.4 million)
2	1	March 14–15	¥474,683,950 ($3.9 million)	¥1.24 billion ($10.4 million)
3	2	March 21–22	¥327 million ($2.7 million)	¥1.76 billion ($14.8 million)
4	1	March 28–29	¥309,586,900 ($2.6 million)	¥2.55 billion ($21.2 million)
5	1	April 4–5	¥254,795,700 ($2.1 million)	¥3.4 billion ($29 million)
6	3	April 11–12	¥139 million ($1.1 million)	¥3.67 billion ($30.8 million)
7	8	April 18–19	¥52 million ($440,000)	¥3.74 billion ($31.4 million)
8	-	April 25–26	¥30 million ($280,000)	¥3.78 billion ($31.7 million)
9	13	May 2–3	¥25 million ($210,000)	¥3.81 billion ($32.0 million)
10	-	May 9–10	¥50 million ($465,000)	¥3.87 billion ($32.5 million)
11	-	May 16–17	¥15 million ($125,900)	¥3.89 billion ($32.7 million)
			Final Total	¥3.93 billion

== See also ==
- List of Doraemon films
