= 25th Japan Academy Film Prize =

Japanese film awards in 2002

- Date: March 8, 2002
- Site: Grand Prince Hotel New Takanawa, Tokyo, Japan
- Hosted by: Hiroshi Sekiguchi; Sayuri Yoshinaga

Highlights
- Best Picture: Spirited Away
- Most awards: Go (9)
- Most nominations: Go (15)

The 25th Japan Academy Film Prize (第25回日本アカデミー賞) is the 25th edition of the Japan Academy Film Prize, an award presented by the Nippon Academy-Sho Association to award excellence in filmmaking. It awarded the best films of 2001 and it took place on March 8, 2002 at the Grand Prince Hotel New Takanawa in Tokyo, Japan.

== Nominees ==
=== Awards ===
Picture of the Year	Director of the Year
Spirited Away; Waterboys; Go; Sennen no Koi Story of Genji; Hotaru	Isao Yukisada – Go; Yōjirō Takita – Onmyōji; Yasuo Furuhata – Hotaru; Kōki Mitani – Minna no Ie; Shinobu Yaguchi – Waterboys
Screenplay of the Year	Popularity Award
Kankurō Kudō – Go; Yō Takeyama and Yasuo Furuhata – Hotaru; Akira Hayasaka – Sennen no Koi Story of Genji; Kōki Mitani – Minna no Ie; Shinobu Yaguchi – Waterboys	Platonic Sex (Production Category); Naoki Tanaka – Minna no Ie (Actor Category)
Outstanding Performance by an Actor in a Leading Role	Outstanding Performance by an Actress in a Leading Role
Yōsuke Kubozuka – Go; Yutaka Takenouchi – Calmi Cuori Appassionati; Satoshi Tsumabuki – Waterboys; Mansai Nomura – Onmyōji; Kōji Yakusho – Warm Water Under a Red Bridge	Keiko Kishi – Kāchan; Kyōko Koizumi – Fūka; Yūko Tanaka – Hotaru; Narumi Yasuda – Taiga no Itteki; Sayuri Yoshinaga – Sennen no Koi Story of Genji
Outstanding Performance by an Actor in a Supporting Role	Outstanding Performance by an Actress in a Supporting Role
Tsutomu Yamazaki – Go; Nenji Kobayashi – Hotaru; Kunie Tanaka – Minna no Ie; Rentarō Mikuni – Taiga no Itteki; Ken Watanabe – Sennen no Koi Story of Genji	Ko Shibasaki – Go; Yūki Amami – Sennen no Koi Story of Genji; Shinobu Otake – Go; Kyōko Koizumi – Onmyōji; Tomoko Naraoka – Hotaru
Outstanding Achievement in Music	Outstanding Achievement in Cinematography
Gakuji Matsuda and Hitomi Shimizu – Waterboys; Shigeru Umebayashi – Onmyōji; Ryōichi Kuniyoshi – Hotaru; Isao Tomita – Sennen no Koi Story of Genji; Meina Co. – Go	Katsumi Yanagishima – Go; Naoki Kayano – Onmyōji; Daisaku Kimura – Hotaru; Tatsuo Suzuki – Sennen no Koi Story of Genji; Toyoshi Tsuda – Calmi Cuori Appassionati
Outstanding Achievement in Lighting Direction	Outstanding Achievement in Art Direction
Hitoshi Takaya – Go; Tatsuya Osada – Onmyōji; Mitsuo Watanabe – Hotaru; Kiyoto Andō – Sennen no Koi Story of Genji; Minoru Kawai – Calmi Cuori Appassionati	Yoshinobu Nishioka and Toshiyuki Matsumiya – Sennen no Koi Story of Genji; Yoshinobu Nishioka – Kāchan; Katsuhiro Fukuzawa – Hotaru; Kyōko Heya – Onmyōji; Hiroshi Wada – Go
Outstanding Achievement in Sound Recording	Outstanding Achievement in Film Editing
Osamu Onodera and Kiyoshi Kakizawa – Onmyōji; Hiromichi Koori – Waterboys; Mike Samata and Tetsuo Segawa – Sennen no Koi Story of Genji; Nobuhiro Shibayama – Go; Tsutomu Honda – Hotaru	Tsuyoshi Imai – Go; Kiyoaki Saitō – Hotaru; Shinya Tadano – Sennen no Koi Story of Genji; Isao Tomita and Nobuko Tomita – Onmyōji; Ryūji Miyajima – Waterboys
Outstanding Foreign Language Film	Newcomer of the Year
Billy Elliot; A.I. Artificial Intelligence; Chocolat; Harry Potter and the Philosopher's Stone; Postmen in the Mountains	Yōsuke Kubozuka – Go; Naoki Tanaka – Minna no Ie; Satoshi Tsumabuki – Waterboys; Mansai Nomura – Onmyōji; Saki Kagami – Platonic Sex; Ko Shibasaki – Go; Hitomi Manaka – Koko ni Iru Koto; Akiko Yagi – Minna no Ie
Award for Distinguished Service from the Chairman	Special Award from the Chairman
Hayao Miyazaki	Kōji Shūndō (Producer); Shinji Sōmai (Director); Hiroshi Teshigahara (Director)
Special Award from the Association	
Ichirō Uno (Music Coordinator); Youmi Kimura (Theme Song for Spirited Away); Yoshiko Matsumoto (Hairdressing); Sumie Maruyama (Hairdressing)	
