= Siren (video game) =

2003 survival horror stealth video game

- North American version cover art
- Developer: Sony Computer Entertainment Japan
- Publisher: Sony Computer Entertainment
- Director: Keiichiro Toyama
- Producer: Takafumi Fujisawa
- Artist: Isao Takahashi
- Writers: Keiichiro Toyama; Naoko Sato
- Composer: Hitomi Shimizu
- Platform: PlayStation 2
- Release: JP: November 6, 2003; EU: March 12, 2004; AU: March 12, 2004; NA: April 20, 2004
- Genres: Survival horror, stealth
- Mode: Single-player

Siren, (Note: Japanese: サイレン, Hepburn: Sairen) known as Forbidden Siren in Europe and Australia, is a 2003 survival horror stealth video game developed and published by Sony Computer Entertainment for the PlayStation 2. It was originally released in Japan on November 6, 2003, and in other regions between March and April of the following year.

Directed and co-written by Keiichiro Toyama after he wrote and directed the original Silent Hill for Konami in 1999, the game revolves around interconnected storylines featuring a cast of characters throughout different time periods who find themselves in the mysterious town of Hanuda, inhabited by the shibito (屍人; lit. "corpse people"), deadly zombie-like creatures. The player must use sightjacking, a power allowing them to see the shibito's perspectives, to help deal with threats as they progress throughout levels.

Though positively received by critics for its story, atmosphere and originality, its gameplay drew criticism. It was followed by a sequel, Forbidden Siren 2, in 2006, and by a remake acting as a re-imagining of its story, Siren: Blood Curse, in 2008. It was also adapted into two manga, titled Siren: Akai Umi no Yobigoe and Siren: ReBIRTH respectively, as well as a movie in 2006.

== Gameplay ==
Siren is divided into stages, each taking place in one of ten areas in the village of Hanuda, and organized chronologically in a table called the "Link Navigator". In order to complete a stage, the player must accomplish a primary objective that usually involves reaching an exit point, subduing undead enemies called shibito, or finding an item. Objectives in different stages are interconnected via a butterfly effect, and a character's actions in one stage can trigger a secondary objective in another stage.

There are miscellaneous items scattered throughout each stage that give the player further insight into the plot's background. Once obtained, these items are archived in a catalog and can be viewed at any time during the game's duration. The game's player characters possess a psychic power known as sightjacking, which enables them to see and hear what a nearby shibito or human sees and hears, and thus pinpoint its position, as well as gain knowledge of their activities and of the position of obtainable items. The clarity of each target depends on the distance from the player character. Once a point of view is located, it can be assigned to one of certain buttons of the controller to easily switch between multiple points of view. However, the player character is unable to move during use of the ability and is thus vulnerable to attack.

The game encourages the player to avoid shibito rather than fight them. Characters can walk silently, avoid the use of a flashlight, and crouch behind objects to elude detection. Certain mission objectives require the player character to use items and/or the environment to distract shibito from their activity, in order for them to achieve a goal. Others require the player to escort a non-player character. Player characters can also shout at any time in order to get the attention of nearby shibito. Within most stages, the player character can hide in certain places such as cupboards and lock doors to prevent shibito from entering. When a shibito hears a sound made by the player character, it will search in the direction from which they heard the sound. If a character is seen by a shibito, the latter will pursue the character to kill them either with a melee or ranged weapon or by strangulation. The shibito will also shout to alert other nearby shibito. Once the character has remained out of the shibito's sight for a period of time, the shibito will give up and resume its usual habits. Weapons are available for the player throughout the game, ranging from melee weapons to firearms. While shibito can be knocked out in combat, they cannot be killed and will reanimate after a short period. If a character is injured, they will eventually recover after a short period of time. Characters will also lose stamina during combat and while running, which will also naturally refill after a short amount of time.

== Plot ==
The story of Siren is told through the alternating perspectives of ten survivors: students Kyoya Suda, Tomoko Maeda, and Harumi Yomoda, professor Tamon Takeuchi, priest Kei Makino, teacher Reiko Takato, celebrity Naoko Mihama, hunter Akira Shimura, as well as visitors Shiro Miyata and Risa Onda. The game follows them as they navigate a supernatural disaster in the (fictional) rural Japanese town of Hanuda (羽生蛇村, in the Japanese version) in 2003 (Heisei year 15). These events are presented outside of chronological order as the characters try to both escape the town and find answers to what has happened in the three days immediately following the disaster.

Initially presented as a mere earthquake, the disaster rapidly becomes far more bizarre and wide-ranging. Most of the population has become infected with an unknown affliction turning them into shibito, displaying severely damaged cognitive function, bleeding from the eyes, and violent hostility towards those not infected. They are also seemingly immortal, able to recover and heal from even fatal injuries in a short time. All natural water sources and rainfall in the town have been replaced with a red, water-like liquid; the town, previously located in a mountainous inland region, has become an island surrounded on all sides by an endless red ocean. Furthermore, multiple sections of the town appear to have been replaced with past versions of themselves; derelict buildings once destroyed by landslides 27 years prior, suddenly reappear or replace their more modern counterparts.

It is revealed that Hanuda, a strongly isolationist community due to historical religious persecution, follows a unique syncretic faith known as the "Mana Religion" which incorporates many Christian and Shinto traditions. The senior figures of this faith, in particular the nun Hisako Yao, had attempted to call forth and appease their god Datatsushi (堕辰子) through the ritual human sacrifice of a girl named Miyako Kajiro who they considered holy for her psychic abilities. When Kyoya Suda, an outsider who had arrived to investigate online ghost stories, accidentally stumbles on the ceremony, Miyako, unwilling to be killed, uses the momentary distraction he provides to flee and causes the ritual to fail. This created the disaster, pulling the entire town into another world where space and time are severely distorted.

The eponymous 'Siren' of the title, heard regularly all across the town throughout the game's events, is the Datatsushi's call, compelling Hanuda's residents to become infected by immersing themselves in the red water, thus creating the army of shibito. Some even evolve new traits such as insectoid wings. They then go about building a nest to house the Datatsushi's corporeal form once it is summoned, as well as killing and converting any remaining humans left in Hanuda. Despite Kyoya being able to slay the Datatsushi at the end of the three days, the story concludes with only Harumi escaping Hanuda alive and returning to the real world, as she is the only human in the town not infected in some way by the red water.

== Development ==
Siren was developed by Project Siren, a team within Sony Computer Entertainment Japan consisting of employees that had worked on the original Silent Hill. Director Keiichiro Toyama presented a draft of the game to producer Takafumi Fujisawa in March 2001, as work on Yoake no Mariko, on which Toyama was design leader, was drawing to a close. The proposal ran to three or four sheets of paper and contained no plot summary, leaving Fujisawa to reconstruct the intended scenario himself over two or three days; Toyama emphasised that the game would build directly on the darker side of Japan. Fujisawa greenlit it on the strength of its originality rather than its presentation. Scenario and background lead Naoko Satō presented alongside Toyama. The project initially carried the working title "Jukai" (樹海), rendered as "Cursed Sea".

Toyama has said that making Silent Hill had awakened his interest in the horror genre, though he preferred works carrying an element of science fiction to outright horror. He conceived Siren during the international success of the film adaptation of Ring, Kiyoshi Kurosawa's Cure and Fuyumi Ono's novel Shiki, and decided to attempt an original Japanese horror work for a worldwide audience, having previously been asked by foreign journalists why a Japanese developer was making a game resembling a Hollywood film. He has described horror as a precarious feeling residing at the border between the normal and the abnormal, and characterised Hanuda as a place adjoining neither the ordinary world nor the other world; the weapons available to characters were accordingly restricted to everyday objects such as crowbars and pokers. Toyama has also cited manga artist Daijiro Morohoshi as a strong influence, particularly his method of reworking folklore and myth into modern settings, and modelled the folklorist Tamon Takeuchi partly on the protagonist of Morohoshi's Yokai Hunter.

The village of Hanuda was based on the internet legend of Sugisawa Village, a hamlet said to have vanished after its inhabitants were massacred, together with the real 1938 Tsuyama massacre and the idea of a dark incident arising within an insular community. The premise of protagonist Kyoya Suda arriving by mountain bike came from an occult thread Toyama had followed on a large message board at the time, in which a boy travelled by mountain bike to a reputedly haunted mountain site. Toyama asked Fujisawa for permission to scout abandoned villages around the country as research, and Fujisawa elected to accompany the team.

Toyama had stepped back from directing after Silent Hill, working as a designer for several years, and returned to the role for Siren. Setting out to depart from the conventions established by Resident Evil and its successors, he drew up a list of self-imposed prohibitions: no scavenging for consumable items, no giant creature bosses, no instantaneous healing items, and no inventory-based lock-and-key puzzles. Ammunition totals were fixed at the start of each scene rather than scattered through levels. He later acknowledged that several of the banned elements returned during production.

The game was conceived around an ensemble cast from the outset. Fujisawa recalled that the original scale envisaged around one hundred controllable characters, each playable only once across the whole game; the cast was progressively reduced to deepen the player's attachment to individual characters, arriving at the final ten. Toyama spent several years maintaining a timetable of every character's movements and actions, onto which Satō layered motivations and background detail; production itself took roughly three years.

Among the proposals Toyama expected to be rejected were the creation of character textures from photographs of real actors, and the establishment of genuine websites and message boards written in-character; both were approved. Rather than employ traditional facial animation methods with polygonal transformation, images of real human faces were captured from eight different angles and superimposed onto the character models, an effect similar to projecting film onto the blank face of a mannequin. The archive items collected in-game were not modelled in computer graphics but physically constructed as film-style props, photographed and inserted into the game; Fujisawa recalled approving a 180-yen receipt for a fish bought at a market, the tail of which was used in building the "altar idol". Concept artist Miki Takahashi has said the art director asked for sea creatures to be incorporated into the shibito because of the "Sea Sending" ritual in the story. She avoided conventional horror signifiers such as decaying flesh, fangs and glaring eyes, reasoning that an obvious intent to intimidate makes a design less interesting, and described the shibito as "not zombies, but rather bodies that are being reborn", giving them the colours and shapes of living marine animals. Her first design, for the character Mina Onda, met with Toyama's approval and clarified the approach for the rest.

Fujisawa recalled that the sightjacking mechanic reached its familiar form only partway through development, earlier prototypes having presented the views of surrounding characters as a series of still images rather than through analogue-stick tuning. Toyama has traced the idea to Team Fortress Classic, which the team had been playing, and to the tension of knowing only that a sniper had the player in their sights; he also cited media artist Kazuhiko Hachiya's 1993 installation Inter Dis-Communication Machine, which exchanged two participants' senses of sight and hearing. The system proved technically demanding, as every shibito and environmental effect had to remain active in memory whether or not it was on screen.

Fujisawa exercised some restraint over content, cutting prototype sequences in which shibito were dispatched in particularly graphic ways, ensuring that shibito who could be defeated were armed so that combat read as self-defence, and having child characters crouch and end the scene when caught rather than depicting the attack.

== Release ==
An overseas release was planned from an early stage, with Fujisawa and Toyama agreeing that the Japanese setting should not be adjusted for foreign markets. A television commercial was withdrawn from broadcast; Toyama has said the withdrawal drew coverage in the sports press and that previously sluggish sales rose sharply as a result.

The game was re-released for the PlayStation 3 on the PlayStation Store. In June 2016 the game received a digital release for the PlayStation 4 in North America, Europe and Australia as an emulated and upscaled version of the PlayStation 2 original with added Trophy support. In October 2024, Sony re-released the game for the PlayStation 5 and PlayStation 4 using its newer PlayStation 2 emulator, adding rewind, save states and video filters along with an expanded Trophy list, and made it available through the PlayStation Plus Premium Classics Catalog on October 15, 2024.

== Reception ==
Reception

Aggregate score
Aggregator	Score
Metacritic	72/100

Review scores
Publication	Score
Edge	7/10
Electronic Gaming Monthly	5.33/10
Eurogamer	7/10
Famitsu	32/40
Game Informer	6.25/10
GamePro	4.5/5
GameSpot	6.7/10
GameSpy	4/5
GameZone	7.8/10
IGN	7.7/10
Official U.S. PlayStation Magazine	3/5
Maxim	6/10

The game received "average" reviews according to the review aggegration website Metacritic. GameSpot's reviewer Bethany Massimilla concluded that although the game had a great story, and interesting characters, it was also tedious. IGN's reviewer Jeremy Dunham praised the originality of the concept, the use of sightjacking, the graphics and the storyline, but criticized the difficulty level and the trial and error nature of the gameplay. GameSpy's Bryan Stratton followed other reviewers in praising the storyline and atmosphere, but criticizing the nature of the gameplay. In Japan, Famitsu gave it a score of one nine, one seven, and two eights for a total of 32 out of 40.

== Sequel and remake ==
Forbidden Siren 2 was released in February 2006. The game tells the story of several characters who become trapped on Yamijima, an island off the coast of mainland Japan. A film based on the second game was released concurrently.

Siren: Blood Curse is the third installment in the series and was released in July 2008. The game is a reimagining of the first game and it tells the story of an American camera crew's disappearance in a mountainous region in Japan.

The series was celebrated in the PlayStation 5 game Astro Bot.

== Manga ==
Sony published a manga series titled Siren: Akai Umi no Yobigoe (Siren: The Call of the Red Sea) which was based on the first game. The manga was drawn by Wataru Kamio and ran from July 2014 to December 2015 in Home-sha's Shinmimibukuro Atmos magazine. The manga was scheduled to move to an online format in April 2016, but due to the author's health complications, the manga was put on hiatus. The game franchise's director Keiichirō Toyama and scenario writer Naoko Satō were supervising all aspects of the manga. It was ultimately discontinued. In 2018, a new ongoing manga titled Siren: ReBIRTH was published to commemorate the fifteenth anniversary of the series. It is written by Saki Yoshi and overseen by the development team of the games.

== Movie ==
A movie adaptation titled Forbidden Siren was released on February 11, 2006, in Japan. It was directed by Yukihiko Tsutsumi and stars a host of actors, such as Yui Ichikawa, Leo Morimoto, Naoki Tanaka, Hiroshi Abe, Naomi Nishida, Suzuki Matsuo, Kyusaku Shimada, Mai Takahashi, and Jun Nishiyama. The movie depicts the Amamoto family (which consists of main protagonist Yuki, her father Shin, and Yuki's younger brother Hideo) who arrive on the solitary island of Yamajima, where Yuji discovers that the island holds a deadly secret.
