= Slitterhead =

2024 video game

- Official VG art released in North America
- Developer: Bokeh Game Studio
- Publisher: Bokeh Game Studio
- Directors: Keiichiro Toyama; Junya Okura
- Producer: Kazunobu Sato
- Designer: Satoru Yamabe
- Programmer: Atsushi Nakamura
- Artist: Takahiro Fujii
- Writer: Keiichiro Toyama
- Composer: Akira Yamaoka
- Platforms: PlayStation 4; PlayStation 5; Windows; Xbox Series X/S
- Release: November 8, 2024
- Genre: Action-adventure
- Mode: Single-player

Slitterhead (Note: Japanese: 野狗子, Hepburn: Yakushi) is a 2024 horror action-adventure game developed and published by Bokeh Game Studio. It was released for PlayStation 4, PlayStation 5, Windows, and Xbox Series X/S on November 8, 2024. It received mixed reviews from critics.

== Gameplay ==
Slitterhead's gameplay is based on Gravity Rush and the Siren games.

== Plot ==
Slitterhead takes places in the 1990s in Kowloon where mysterious monsters called Slitterheads are sighted killing humans.

It starts with a spirit-like being called Hyoki possessing a dog and multiple people before defending a girl named Julee against a Slitterhead. Julee ends up being a Rarity, a person who not only remains conscious during possession, but has special powers and abilities when possessed. Julee gives Hyoki the name Night Owl, based on an old legend about two spirits named Night Owl and Leopard Head who fight the Slitterheads.

After discovering that Night Owl has the ability to transfer knowledge and memories back in time, they start fighting major Slitterheads and recruiting other Rarities. However, they eventually encounter a Slitterhead with similar time powers to Night Owl. This Slitterhead torments the Rarity Alex, and starts to drive him insane with anger and hatred. This eventually starts to overwhelm Night Owl, causing a rift between him and Julee.

Alex also kills the other Rarities, intending to forever punish himself with killing Slitterheads in the time loop. Julee is possessed by Leopard Head, another Hyoki, and attempts to stop Alex but is killed. However, Night Owl then transfers over to an alternate timeline where Alex was the one possessed by Leopard Head. It is eventually revealed both Night Owl and the Slitterheads are actually time travelers from an apocalyptic future. However, the travel process went wrong, resulting in the majority of travelers to turn into the parasitic race that are the Slitterheads. Night Owl is the only person who successfully traveled back, and Leopard Head is actually an alternate version of him.

Night Owl then remembers he brought back a device similar to a mystic seal in case he encountered a foe he couldn't beat. After retrieving this seal, Night Owl returns to the original timeline to seal away the time manipulating Slitterhead and stop Alex's self destructive behavior. However, upon returning to the other timeline, it is revealed Alex has once again killed the other Rarities besides Julee. After Julee and Night owl win a final confrontation, Alex has Leopard Head forcefully crash a plane into the city.

Rewinding time one last time, Night Owl has all the Rarities except Julee go into hiding before confronting Alex. This time, Night Owl possesses a person in the plane and manages to avert the crash. However, Alex's body quickly disappears. A post credits scene shows a possessed Alex driving off, with a message saying that the fight will continue into the next era.

== Development and marketing ==
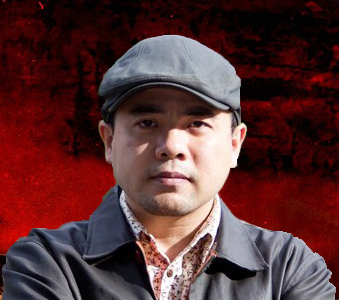
Game director Keiichiro Toyama is also known for his work on Silent Hill.

In September 2020, Silent Hill creator Keiichiro Toyama left Sony Interactive Entertainment to form his own company, Bokeh Game Studio. A video posted by the studio in December of that year indicated that their first project would be an action-adventure game with horror elements. This title, Slitterhead, was first announced on December 9, 2021 at The Game Awards.

Bokeh Game Studio published a video diary on July 6, 2023, on pre-alpha testing that was underway in the same year.

The game is directed by Keiichiro Toyama. The Slitterheads are designed by Miki Takahashi and Tatsuya Yoshikawa, with music done by Akira Yamaoka.

=== Design ===
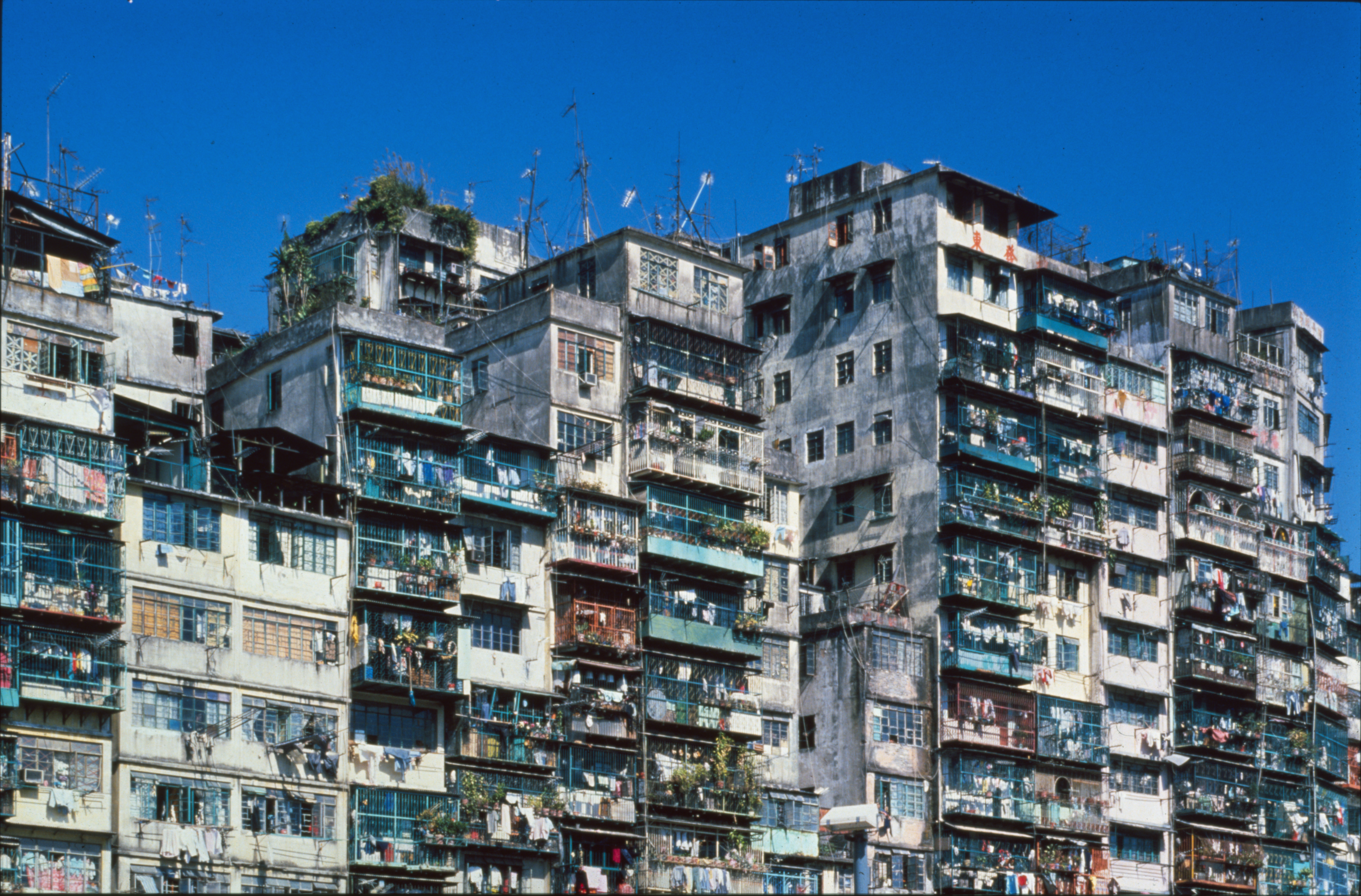
Slitterhead was partially inspired by Kowloon Walled City (pictured in 1991).

In a September 2024 interview, Toyama mentioned that the game is based on the former Kowloon Walled City, although he made travels to Hong Kong to do on-site research. He also credits the movie Chungking Express, where he got story ideas based on the Chungking Mansions.

For designing the Slitterheads, Toyama credits Gantz, Parasyte, and Tokyo Ghoul alongside actual Chinese supernatural creatures like the yegouzi. According to Toyama, Yamaoka, and Yoshikawa, they used seinen manga to "bridge the gap between horror fans and players who avoid a game because of its horror elements."

== Reception ==
Reception

Aggregate scores
Aggregator	Score
Metacritic	(PC) 66/100 (PS5) 62/100 (XSXS) 68/100
OpenCritic	65/100

Review scores
Publication	Score
Digital Trends	2.5/5
Eurogamer	4/5
Famitsu	34/40
GameSpot	4/10
GamesRadar+	4/5
Hardcore Gamer	3.5/5
IGN	5/10
PC Gamer (US)	70/100
PCGamesN	5/10
Push Square	7/10
TechRadar	4/5
Video Games Chronicle	2/5

Slitterhead received "mixed or average" reviews from critics, according to the review aggregator website Metacritic. 28% of critics recommended the game, according to OpenCritic. In Japan, four critics from Famitsu gave the game a total score of 34 out of 40.

Tristan Ogilvie of IGN praised the game’s unique body-swapping mechanics and blood-based combat, but criticized it for repetitive missions, limited enemy variety, and a shallow story that overstayed its welcome. Similarly, Greysun Morales of Game Rant praised the game's unique playable characters and premise, but criticized the plot, repetitive combat, and unclear progression.
