= Naoki Tanaka (comedian) =

Japanese comedian (born 1971)

- 田中 直樹
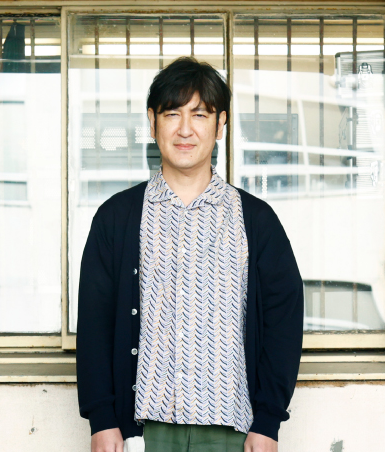
- Tanaka in 2023
- Born: April 26, 1971 (age 55); Toyonaka, Osaka Prefecture
- Spouse: Shie Kohinata (m. 2003; div. 2017)
- Children: 2

Comedy career
- Years active: 1992–

Notes
- Same year/generation as: Takashi Fujii; Kenji Tamura

Naoki Tanaka (田中 直樹, Tanaka Naoki; born 26 April 1971) is a Japanese comedian, actor and television presenter, who is the leader and the boke of the owarai kombi Cocorico with his partner Shozo Endo. He has appeared in many television programmes and films. He is known for being a regular member of Downtown no Gaki no Tsukai ya Arahende!!, which he and Endo have worked on since 1997.

Tanaka is also known for his love of animals, especially sea creatures, and on 24 June 2018, he became the Marine Stewardship Council ambassador for Japan.

== Filmography ==
=== Current appearances ===
==== TV programmes ====
Regular programmes

- ZIP! (6 Oct 2016 –, NTV) – Thursday Main Personality
- Kinkyu SOS! Ike no Mizu zenbu Nuku (15 Jan 2017 –, TX) – MC
- Life!: Jinsei ni Sasageru Conte series-6 (13 Apr 2018 –, NHK G)
- Tokoro JAPAN (October 29, 2018 –, Kansai TV / Fuji TV) – Semi-regular
- Academy Night G (April 2, 2019 –, TBS) – MC
- I Am Bouken Shonen (April 23, 2014 – March 26, 2015 and May 25, 2020 –, TBS)
- Downtown No Gaki No Tsukai Ya Arahende (1997 –, NTV)

Internet

- YoshiLog (GyaO!) – Monthly regular
- Gokuraku Tonbo KakeruTV (2017 –, AbemaTV, AbemaGolden9) – Quasi-regular

=== Former programmes ===
- Music×Drama Special M no Shikai-sha (13 Oct 2006, CX) – Starring; as Susumu Kozukue
- Rankin no Paradise (24 Nov 2006 – 12 Sep 2008, MBS–TBS)
- ~Geodeki! Pop Company~ Pop-ya (7 Apr – 22 Sep 2008, CX)
- Ojomama! F (Apr 2008 – Mar 2009, KTV)
- Check! The No.1 (Oct 2008 – Mar 2009, MBS – TBS)
- Tobidase! Kagaku-kun (Apr 2009 – Sep 2011, TBS)
- Cocorico Naoki Tanaka no Onomichi Photo Sanpo (19 Sep 2009, HTV)
- Uchimura–Tanaka no Shirarezaru How-to Sekai Tadashī Sora no Tobikata (9 Oct 2009, CX)
- Chō Heibon Hakase Tanaka (5 Nov 2011 – 30 Mar 2013, TBS)
- Cocorico Naoki Tanaka no (3 Apr 2012 – 19 Mar 2013, NHK E) – Navigator
- TV de Chūgoku-go (8 Jul 2012, NHK BS Premium)
- Life!: Jinsei ni Sasageru Conte series-0 to 5 (1 Sep 2012 –, NHK G)
- Quiz 100-Ninriki (27 Oct 2012 – Mar 2015, NHK G)
- Conte no Gekijō: The Actors' Comedy (26 Jan, 31 May, 30 Aug, 29 Nov 2013, NHK BS Premium)
- 100% Entertainment (18 Feb 2013, GT)
- Měi! Shàonǚ shèngdiǎn (24 Jun 2013, EBC dōngsēn zònghé)
- Mimura & Ariyoshi Tokuban (8 Jan 2014 – 7 Jun 2015, TV Asahi)
- Tan Q! A Trip (24 Jan 2015 – 19 Mar 2016, TVA) – Monthly
- 1-Ko dake Yellow (24 Apr 2015 – 30 Mar 2017, NBN) – MC
- Shitteru or Shittaka? Quiz! Balevel no Tō (17 Oct 2015, ABC)
- Uta no Golden Hit (2 Oct 2017, TBS)
- Tetsuko no Heya (23 Jul 2018, TV Asahi)
- Nihon Sōzō Kikō: Watisuto (7 Apr – 23 Jun 2018, BS11) – MC

=== TV dramas ===
- Moero!! Robocon (1 Aug 1999, EX) – as Passerby
- Yonimo Kimyōna Monogatari Autumn Special Edition "" (Sep 1999, CX) – Starring as Shimura
- Ashita Ga Arusa (2001, NTV)
- Gakko no Sensei (2001, TBS) – as Atsushi Onodera
- Kaiki Daisakusen: Second File (Apr 2007, BS-hi) – Starring; as Kyosuke Misawa
- Mirai Yuenchi (28 Sep 2007, EX) – Starring; as Tatsuya Hasebe
- Loss:Time:Life (8 Mar 2008, CX) – Starring; as Koichi Kitazawa
- Mirai Yuenchi 2 (28 Mar 2008, EX)
- Reset (15 Jan 2009, NTV) – Starring as Henry
- Renzoku Drama Shōsetsu Kinoshita-buchō to Boku (2010, YTV) – as Daisuke Kanagawa
- Honjitsu wa Taian Nari (2012, NHK) – as Junichi Tokura
- Platina Town (2012, Wowow) – as Kotaro Ushijima
- Yūsha Yoshihiko to Akuryō no Kagi (7 Dec 2012, TX) – as Morgan
- Link (2013, Wowow) – as Tsutomu Sawada
- Isha-ryō Bengoshi: Anata no Namida, Okane ni Kaemashou (Jan–Mar 2014, YTV) – Starring as Yukio Hakamada
- Alice no Toge (Apr – Jun 2014, TBS) – as Junichi Chihara
- Mother Game: Kanojo-tachi no Kaikyū (Apr – Jun 2015, TBS) – as Okinawa Ward Office official
- I'm Home (23 Apr 2015, EX) – as Toshi Yamanobe
- KariKare (Nov 2015, NHK BS Premium) – as Yoshiharu Sano
- Neko Zamurai Tamanojō Edo e Iku (Feb 2016, JAITS co-production) – Starring as Himatsu
- Eiko Kyōju no Jiken-bo (21 May 2016, EX) – as Haruto Nanba
- Asa ga Kuru (Jun – Jul 2016, THB–CX) – as Kiyokazu Kurihara
- Suna no Tō~Shiri sugita Rinjin (Oct – Dec 2016, TBS) – as Kenichi Takano
- Kasei Otto no Mitazono (Oct – Dec 2016, EX) – as Kengo Tomita
- Masuyama Chō Nōryoku-shi Jimusho (5 Jan – Mar 2017, YTV) – Starring as Keitaro Masuyama
- Jiro Asada: Prison Hotel (Oct – Dec 2017, BS Japan) – Starring as Kazuma Hanazawa
- Keishichō Zero Gakari ~ Seikatsu Anzen-ka Nan Demo Sōdan-shitsu ~ THIRD SEASON, Episode 3 (17 Aug 2018, TV TOKYO) – As himself
- Harassment Game, Episode 1 (15 Oct 2018, TV TOKYO) – as Muto Yuzuru
- Wagaya no himitsu, Episode 1 (3 Mar 2019, NHK BS Premium) – as Kiyoshi Yamamoto
- EdoMoiselle ~ Reiwa de koi, itashinsu ~ (7 Jan 2021–, YTV) – as Yuhiko Kurachi
- The 13 Lords of the Shogun (2022, NHK) – as Kujō Kanezane
- Chosen Home (2025, NTV) – as Seiji Okabe

=== Internet dramas ===
- Utsunuke (scheduled Fall 2018) – Starring as Keiichi Tanaka
- Even Though We're Adults (2025, Hulu) – as Hayato Iwakami

=== Films ===
- Minna no Ie (2001) – as Naosuke Iijima – won the Japan Academy Film Prize New Actor Award
- Walking with the Dog (2004) – Starring as Yasuyuki Okamura
- Gyakkyō Nine (2005) – as Takeshi Sakakibara
- The Uchōten Hotel (2006) – as Naosuke Iijima (Cameo appearance)
- Forbidden Siren (2006) – as Yutaka Minamida
- Argentine Hag (2007) – as Mamoru Mukai
- Fine, Totally Fine (2007) – as Yuhara
- The Glorious Team Batista (2008) – as Makoto Himuro
- Zebraman 2: Attack on Zebra City (2010) – as Zebraman TV ver./Junichi Ichiba
- Welcome Home, Hayabusa (2012) – as Daigo Iwamatsu
- Da Color?~The Datsugoku Survival (2016) – Starring
- Neko Zamurai Tamanojō Edo e Iku (2016) – as Himatsu (Hikuaku)
- Kin Medal Otoko (2016) – as Nakano-sensei
- Masuyama Chō Nōryoku-shi Jimusho: Gekijō-ban wa Koi no Aji (2018) – Starring as Keitaro Masuyama
- Kaitou Sentai Lupinranger VS Keisatsu Sentai Patranger: en film (2018) – as Herlock Sholmes/Unknown Gangler Monster
- Organ (2019) – as Shigeru Wakimoto
- Ox-Head Village (2022)
- From Spice with Love (2023)

=== Stage ===
- OneOr8: Bakugyaku no Inu (2008)

=== TV anime ===
- Oden-kun (Apr 2005 – Feb 2009, NHK E) – as Kamisama
- Ganbare! Oden-kun (Jan 2013 – Dec 2014, ABC) – as Kamisama
- It is Living Happily on Ground Every Day (Apr 2013 – Mar 2014, NHK BS Premium) – Narrator

=== Anime films ===
- Summer Days with Coo (2007) – as Yasuo Uehara
- Hutch the Honeybee (2010) – as Kunekune
- Kuma no Gakkō (2010) – as Katie's Papa
- Crayon Shin-chan: Fierceness That Invites Storm! Me and the Space Princess (2012) – as Ikemen De Ikemen Gundan member
- Violence Voyager (2019) – as George

=== Dubbing ===
- Son of the Mask (2005) – as Tim
- The Final Destination (2009) – as Nick O'Bannon
- Amazonia (2015) – Narrator
- Jurassic World (2017, NTV ver.) – as Jimmy Fallon
- Space Jam: A New Legacy (2021) – as The Brow

=== Documentaries ===
- NHK Special Yamai no Kigen Prologue Jinrui Shinka 700 Man-nen no Shukumei (18 May 2013, NHK)

=== DVD ===
- Personal Katsudō – From 26 Oct 2005, Tanaka himself released a volume of his conte DVDs every three months, and ended with five volumes.

=== Internet ===
- Yoshimoto Online "Yoshomoto Gakuen! Yahoo! Sensei" (2009 – 2011, Yoshimoto Gekijō, Saturdays 22:00–23:20)
- Tanaka • Nemu no Hirameke! Denkikki (2017-2019, KawaiianTV)

=== In-flight programmes ===
- JAL original in-flight programme Yoshimoto JALTV First Shot (Dec 2009 – Jan 2010, screened in Japan Airlines)

=== Advertisements ===
- JA Bank
- Kao Corporation Humming Fine – Co-starred with Yō Yoshida
- Promise - with Rei Okamoto, Junpei Mizobata and Naomi Nishida

=== Serialisations ===
- National Geographic Channel – Column serialisations on its official website. "Cocorico Tanaka no " (Jun 2015 –)

== Books ==
- Cocorico Tanaka x Naganuma Takeshi presents Zukai Ikimono Ga Miteiru Sekai (July, 2015、Gakken Publishing) ISBN 978-4054063112

== Awards ==
- 25th Japan Academy Film Prize - Rookie Of The Year and Popularity (Minna No Ie)
- The 29th The Television Drama Academy Awards - New Actor Award (Ashita ga Arusa)
- Warai No Saiten!! The Dream Match '05 (With Masakazu Mimura)

== Publications ==
- Cocorico Tanaka×Takeshi Naganuma presents Zukai: Ikimono ga Miteiru Sekai (Jul 2015, Gakken Publishing) ISBN 978-4054063112
