= Cocorico (comedy duo) =

Japanese comedy duo

- Kokoriko (ココリコ)
- Employer: Yoshimoto Kōgyō

Comedy career
- Years active: 1992–
- Genres: Manzai, conte
- Members: Shōzō Endō (Tsukkomi); Naoki Tanaka (Boke)

Notes
- Same year/generation as: Takashi Fujii; TKO

Cocorico (ココリコ, Kokoriko) is a Japanese comedy duo (kombi) formed in 1992, consisting of Shōzō Endō (遠藤章造, Endō Shōzō) and Naoki Tanaka (田中直樹, Tanaka Naoki). They are best known for making up the cast of the popular and long-running variety show Downtown no Gaki no Tsukai ya Arahende!!.

== Members ==
- Shōzō Endō (born July, 13, 1971), the tsukkomi.
- Naoki Tanaka (born April, 26, 1971), the boke and leader of the duo who writes all of their material.

== History ==
Both were born and raised in Toyonaka, Osaka. They were classmates during elementary and middle school and were members of their school's baseball club, with Endo a pitcher and Tanaka a catcher.

After their graduation, Endō was a salesman of office equipment in Takamatsu, Kagawa until he resigned. Aspiring to become a comedian, he moved to Tokyo and invited Tanaka, who was a design student in Osaka, to form a comedy duo.

Different from most Japanese comedians, who studied at comedy schools before debuting, Endō and Tanaka had not had any mentoring and were looking for another way to debut. Watching an announcement on TV, they auditioned for Yoshimoto Kōgyō Batamon Club and passed on their first attempt. Originally known as Cocorico Bombers, they were later advised by Kōji Kato (Gokuraku Tonbo) to shorten their name to their current one.

In 1994 Cocorico had their first movie appearance as the main characters of Yankee Gurentai Nanbo no Monjai! 2 and started to appear on such popular variety shows as Waratte Itomo!! and Vocabula Tengoku. Cocorico also worked many times since their early days with the veteran comedy duo Utchan Nanchan.

In 1995 Cocorico appeared for the first time on Gaki no Tsukai as contestants on a comedy competition. The duo would further appear on the show and open for the manzai shows of Downtown until February 9, 1997, when Endō and Tanaka became part of the regular cast.

In 1996 the duo started to work on a radio program, Cocorico no Kairaku Shawā Okoku, which aired on CBC Radio until 1999 and was revived on September 2, 2021 as a special program to celebrate CBC Radio's 70th anniversary.

In 1998 they started to break. Their TV appearances started to increase considerably and Cocorico would also appear on entertainment magazine covers and make commercials for famous brands like Glico, Hitachi and Coco Store. This year also saw the premiere of their own highly-rated show, Cocorico Ogon Densetsu, broadcast by TV Asahi and successfully airing until 2016.

Cocorico started to do solo activities from around 2000 and from 2005 it has begun to increase. They also started to appear in dramas and get major roles at movies.

In the 2000s, Cocorico's shows like Cocorico Miracle Type and Cocorico Million Kazoku was starting to increase, most of those were broadcast by Fuji TV.

The duo won their first prize at 2001, that was the Entertainment Award from the 39th Golden Arrow. At the same year, Cocorico appeared for the first and only time on a drama called Ashita ga Arusa, along many other popular rookie comedians at that time. Ashita Ga Arusa made Tanaka win his first prize at acting, 29th The Television Drama Academy Awards. He won the New Actor Award. At 2002, Tanaka, for his acting in Minna no Ie, won the 25th Japan Academy Awards as Newcomer of the Year and the Popularity prize, the only category in Japan Academy Awards chosen by popular voting.

In the 2000s, Endō's popular gag "Ho-ho-hoi" became a trend. He won the 1st place on a High Tension Series from Gaki no Tsukai with this gag. Endō has also garnered attention for his looks and comedy, and has appeared in high positions in the Yoshimoto Kōgyō's "most handsome entertainers" rankings.

In 2019 Cocorico was invited to be the hosts of the Tokyo Olympics countdown events.

On November 26, 2021, the duo opened their YouTube channel, called "Cocorico Channel", focused on conte. The debut video, "Panda No Shazai Kaiken" (パンダの謝罪会見 "Panda's Apology Press Conference"), surpassed 10,000 views in less than 48 hours.

== Personal life ==
Although Endo and Tanaka were childhood friends, at their early days as a comedy duo their relationship wasn't good. Housei Tsukitei related that at those times at Gaki no Tsukai backstage had difficulties to talk with Cocorico members when the three were together. Endo and Tanaka didn't like when Housei talked only to one of them. Their friendship was recovered with the time passing.

Endo married Japanese tarento Chiaki Fujimoto in July 2002. They divorced in December 2007. They have a daughter, Iroha, born in May 2003. In 2015, he remarried a woman who was an ex-manager of Tsutomu Sekine. Their first son was born in the summer of 2016.

Tanaka married Japanese model Shie Kohinata in 2003 and had two sons, born in 2004 and 2008. According to Kohinata in Waratte Iitomo! they hadn't dated before marrying. They divorced in May 2017 and Tanaka got the custody of the children.

Both Cocorico members were awarded at the Best Father Yellow Ribbon Awards, Tanaka in 2013 and Endo in 2018.

In 2021, Endo adopted two dogs and named them "Coco" and "Rico", inspired by the duo's name.

== Works ==
=== TV shows ===
==== Present ====
- Downtown no Gaki no Tsukai ya Arahende!! (ダウンタウンのガキの使いやあらへんで!!) (Nippon TV, since 1989)

==== Past ====
- DABO Gin (1995/4/3 - 1996/3/25, TV Asahi)
- Yoshimoto Tōkyō Shin Hatsubai (TBS)
- UN FACTORY Kabosuke (1995/4 - 1995/9, Fuji TV)
- Suppadaka Bokujō (1996 - 1998 TV Saitama)
- Morita Kazuyoshi Awā Waratte Iitomo! (1997/4 - 2006/9, Fuji TV)
- Nakai Masahiro no Bokura Wa Minna Ikite Iru (1997/10/29 - 1998/9/16, Fuji TV)
- Shonen Satoru → Chojin Satoru (1997/10 - 1998/3, Fuji TV)
- Habatake! Penguin (1998/4/15 - 1998/8/26, TBS)
- Cocorico Oogon Densetsu → Cocorico A-kyu Densetsu → Ikinari! Kogane Densetsu (1998/10/6 - 2016/12/18, TV Asahi)
- Sata☆Suma (1998/10/31 - 2002/3/23, Fuji TV) - irregular appearance
- Cocorico Kaijokasai (1998/11 - 1999/10, MBS)
- Ginga Pikaichi Terebi (1998, MBS)
- Fujiriko (1999/10/1 - 2002/3/13, Yomiuri TV)
- Akashiya Mansion Monogatari (1999/10/13 - 2001/9/26, Fuji TV)
- Cocorico Miracle Type (2001/4/11 - 2007/9/5, Fuji TV)
- Shijo Saikyo no Mega Hit Karaoke Best 100 Kanpeki ni Utatte 1000-man'en (2000 - 2004, TV Asahi)
- Taikutsu Kizoku (2003/10 - 2004/3, Fuji TV)
- Waraido (2005/3/21 - 2007/7/7, MBS)
- Puroyagu All Star Super Battle (2005 - 2006, Tokai TV)
- Buchi Nuki (2005/4/4 - 2006/3/24, TV Tokyo)
- Cocorico Milion Kazoku (2006/4/4 - 2008/12/9, TV Tokyo)
- Cocorico Gout Temps Miracle Nouveau Type (2006/9/13 - 2007/3/28, Fuji TV)
- Oto Rico (2007/10/4 - 2008/3/27, Nippon TV)
- MMM (2008/4 - 2009/3, Yomiuri TV)
- Shinshun Tsurube Daishin'nen Kai (2009-2011, Fuji TV)
- Japan International Birdman Rally (2010, Yomiuri TV) - 33rd male moderator
- Nara≒Deki ~○○Nara××Dekiru Wa Zu~ → Tensai Kids Zeinshuugou Kiminara Dekiru (2017/10/16 - 2018/2/5, TV Asahi)
- Unmei no Hito Oshi ~Koko de Inkan O Oshimasu Ka?~ (2018/4/12 - 2018/9/27, TV Asahi)
- Kami Hitoe (2019/4 - 2020/9/21, TV Asahi)

=== Drama ===
- Hamada Masatoshi no Jikken Dorama Heisei Mystery Jiken-bo (1999/03/18, TV Asahi)
- Ashita ga Arusa (2001/4/21 - 6/30, Nippon TV)
- Kikiippatsu Dorama Special: Flying Boys (2002/10/0, Fuji TV)

=== Radio shows ===
==== Past ====
- Cocorico no Kairaku Shawā Okoku (1996/10 - 1999/3, revived in 2021/9/2, CBC Radio)
- Cocorico no @llnightnippon.com (1999/4 - 2001/3, Nippon Broadcasting System)
- Cocorico no All Night Nippon Premium (2017/10 - 2017/12, 2018/10 - 2019/3, Nippon Broadcasting System)

=== Movies ===
- Yankee Gurentai Nanbo no Monjai! 2 (1994) - starring, under the name of "Cocorico Bombers"
- Kishiwada Shōnen Gurentai Yakyū-dan〈Kishiwada Shōnen Yakyū-dan〉(2000) - starring
- Kishiwada Shōnen Gurentai Chō Tokubetsu-hen I had a dream (2000) - starring
- Ashita Ga Arusa THE MOVIE (2002)

=== Dubbing ===
- Son of the Mask (2005)

=== Advertising ===
- Pretz (Ezaki Glico)
- Cocostore
- POP CHIP (House Shokuhin)
- Georgia (Coca Cola Japan)
- Promise (SMBC Consumer Finance)

=== Music ===
- Kanashimi No Yokae (2001/5/23, East West Japan) - under the name of "Endo Shozo to Tanaka-san"

=== Book ===
- Cocorico Miracle Type (2003/3/27, Kadokawa Shoten, ISBN 9784048535847)

== Awards ==
- 39th Golden Arrow Award: Performing Arts Award
