= Siren: Blood Curse =

2008 video game

- Developer: Japan Studio
- Publisher: Sony Computer Entertainment
- Director: Keiichiro Toyama
- Producer: Takafumi Fujisawa
- Artist: Isao Takahashi
- Writers: Naoko Sato; Keiichiro Toyama
- Composer: Hitomi Shimizu
- Platform: PlayStation 3
- Release: WW: July 24, 2008; AU: October 29, 2008
- Genres: Survival horror, stealth
- Mode: Single-player

Siren: Blood Curse (Note: Known in Japan as Siren: New Translation (Japanese: サイレン: ニュー トランスレーション, Hepburn: Sairen:Nyū Toransurēshon)) is a 2008 survival horror stealth game developed and published by Sony Computer Entertainment for the PlayStation 3. The third and final installment in the Siren series, Blood Curse was released in July 2008 in Japan and on the PlayStation Store in North America and PAL regions. It was released in October 2008 in Australia and Europe and in December on the PlayStation Store in Japan.

Blood Curse is a reimagining of the first installment in the series, Siren (2003), with many alterations to structure and content, along with most of the gameplay improvements introduced in Forbidden Siren 2. The game follows a cast of interconnected characters as they try to survive a cursed village in a remote area of Japan. The game received generally favorable reviews.

== Gameplay ==
In Siren: Blood Curse, the Link Navigator from previous games is replaced by a series of twelve chronological episodes, each containing parallel and intersecting chapters for different player characters. Each chapter consists of either a cutscene or a mission, the latter being where gameplay mainly takes place.

The main gameplay of Blood Curse generally involves controlling a player character from third-person perspective. The player must complete missions to progress the story, while evading the shibito, the game's main enemies. The series' signature "Sight Jack" ability operates in an automated split-screen mode, allowing the player to see through the eyes of others while continuing to play normally. Sight jacking is imperative to surviving in the game; the player can only discover clues to their next goal or target through this ability.

Blood Curse puts an emphasis on stealth gameplay. When the player enters a shibito's vicinity, a heartbeat-like drum will sound to warn the player. Shibito are usually found standing guard at certain points, preventing entry; or patrolling the area on a set path. Should the player get a shibito's attention, it will attack the player until the latter's death. It is possible to knock a shibito out for a small amount of time; however, it will eventually resurrect and attack again. If the player manages to successfully hide from an alerted Shibito, it may give up and resume its idle activity.

Characters are generally unarmed at the start of a mission, making them easy targets for any who see them. The player can only carry one weapon at any time. Weapons include shovels, pistols, rifles, and a katana. In some situations, the player must brace doors to prevent shibito from entering; in others, they must hide to sneak past a shibito following a patrol route.

In the Archives catalog, the player has access to audio recordings, videos, and documents collected by fulfilling certain conditions in an episode. The Archive includes a record of the weapons found throughout the game. The documents can uncover story details hinted upon in the episodes.

== Synopsis ==
=== Setting and characters ===
Siren: Blood Curse features a cast of interconnected characters, caught up in the unnatural forces surrounding Hanuda Village, Japan. The main protagonist is Howard Wright, an American high school student who arrives in Hanuda due to a mysterious e-mail message. Throughout the game, he encounters members of an American TV crew: Sam Monroe, a cultural anthropologist and college professor; Melissa Gale, a TV presenter and Sam's ex-wife; Bella Monroe, Sam and Melissa's ten-year-old daughter; and Sol Jackson, the cameraman. He also encounters Miyako (美耶古), a girl who wishes to escape Hanuda; Seigo Saiga (犀賀 省悟, Saiga Seigo), a doctor of the local Saiga Hospital; and Amana, an amnesiac Caucasian who is revealed to be the main human antagonist.

The game is mostly set in Hanuda Village (羽生蛇村, Hanyūda Mura), including the Karuwari and Tabori districts, the Hanuda Mine, and the Saiga Hospital. The village is home to the unique Mana religion. The dead humans who now roam the area, the shibito (屍人; lit. "corpse people"), are a result of the Mana "god" Kaiko (蚕子; lit. "silkworm child"), the primary antagonist. Because of Kaiko's influence, Hanuda is "cut off" from the outside world, preventing communication and escape from the village.

=== Plot ===
On the night of August 2, 2007, an American TV crew visits Hanuda Village, Japan, a mountain village that vanished in 1976. There, Sol and Melissa stumble upon a Mana ritual, where Yukie Kobe is murdered as a sacrifice. Howard Wright intervenes, allowing Miyako to escape unharmed. Howard runs to find help, but is attacked by a hostile policeman. Killing the officer, Howard discovers that the man was already dead. As he crosses a bridge, an ominous siren shakes the region, and the policeman, a shibito, shoots Howard, who falls into a river. Meanwhile, Yukie resurrects as a shibito and attacks the camera crew, separating them.

Howard wakes up downstream, having survived the gunshot. Amana assists him, but is carried away by a flying shibito. Sam reawakens in the Hanuda mines, and reunites with Melissa. When Bella, hiding in the Saiga Hospital, calls for help, Sol, now a shibito, finds and attacks her. Howard encounters Miyako and attempts to escape with her.

Later, Sam and Melissa meet Saiga. After they leave, Saiga decides to kill himself after Yukie, his fiancée, appears again. The Monroes encounter Bella, who died and has become a shibito. Amana recovers her lost memories, remembering that she is to bring the god Kaiko into the world. She subdues Howard, and takes Miyako into the Shibito Nest. Howard pursues them, but is too late: Miyako has already been sacrificed. He encounters Sam and Bella, both shibito, and an insane Melissa who shoots and kills him.

However, Bella and Howard's deaths cause a time loop, returning to when Howard first encountered Amana. Both retain their memories: Howard remembers her actions from the previous timeline and runs away.

In this timeline, Sol and Sam reunite in the mines; while Melissa finds Bella safe in the hospital. However, Sol dies after he and Sam are surrounded, and Melissa dies while saving Bella. Saiga, experiencing déjà vu, protects Bella and uncovers an ancient Mana text. Sam finds the text and discovers their experiences were all predestined. Howard, meanwhile, recalls Miyako melded her blood with his to prevent him from becoming a shibito, and searches for her. Bella narrowly escapes from Melissa, now another shibito.

Howard finds Miyako, who explains the village is caught in an unending time loop, and they must release the "other power" to stop it. They break the seals, but Amana appears, knocking Howard unconscious and kidnapping Miyako. Saiga and Bella tail Howard to the hospital, where Saiga "experiments" on a shibito. He then goes to the mines, fights a mutated Yukie and retrieves an artifact called "the Uryen". Howard, Bella, and Sam enter the shibito nest and see Amana sacrifice Miyako in the red sea, this time summoning Kaiko: an otherworldly insectoid monster. Amana, however realizes something is wrong: Kaiko's form is incomplete and fragile.

Saiga uses the Uryen, the "fruit" that Amana was supposed to use to resurrect Kaiko in its true form, to unleash sacred fire on Kaiko after it impales him. Howard and Sam get separated from Bella: Howard realizes Sam had sent Howard the email that brought him here, but Sam has no recollection of this and follows Bella to the Nest's core where he encounters Melissa and Sol. As Sol corners Bella, Melissa intervenes, but they fall through an orange void. Howard, meanwhile, finds Miyako's spirit in the pool's reflection; she requests he "make it all disappear". Falling in, he enters "Inferno" (いんふぇるの), where he encounters Saiga's spirit.

Giving him the Uryen, Saiga battles Howard as a test; he defeats Saiga, who leaves behind a sword. Amana appears, and offers herself up to resurrect Kaiko's true form: a mass of floating insect parts. With Miyako's spirit guiding him, Howard turns the sword into a vessel for the "other power", which the Uryen's flame unleashes and he destroys the deity. Amana returns and says the ritual has succeeded, then walks away. Sam falls into another orange void, which deposits him into Hanuda in 1976, after the village was washed away in a flood. He comments that "everything must be repeated so that Bella can exist forever", and remembers Howard, ensuring that these events would repeat.

In the epilogue, Howard approaches Hanuda's shibito, while listening to his music player. Armed with guns, Saiga's sword, and the Uryen, Howard begins to destroy the village: his "promise to Miyako."

== Development and release ==
Director and co-writer Keiichiro Toyama said: "Siren Blood Curse is not a sequel or a standard remake of the other games. Suppose the events of the original SIREN were real, in that case Siren Blood Curse would be like a 'movie based on a true story', adapting and dramatizing the original. While some of the key events bear resemblance to those in the first SIREN, the characters and the background are completely different. The addition of Western characters who have stumbled into horrific events taking place in a world that is foreign to them helps enhance the feelings of isolation and terror. I think they will also present Western players with characters that are easier to relate to. This mix of Western and Japanese characters with the inevitable communication troubles that ensue adds to the frustration the various characters feel toward their situation. We were able to present the game more like a dramatic TV show in a way that hasn’t been done before. A lot of survival horror titles in recent years have been focusing mostly on just the action element, while Siren Blood Curse puts a lot of its effort into scaring the player and presenting a rich story". The game was promoted with a special area at PlayStation Home, including the Ward of Despair minigame lobby for up to five players.

The original soundtrack of Siren: Blood Curse, titled Siren: New Translation Original Soundtrack was released in Japan on August 27, 2008. The European release of Blood Curse includes an exclusive making-of documentary titled Behind the Curtain of Terror, which is accessed via the PlayStation 3's XMB Video menu.

== Reception ==
Reception

Aggregate score
Aggregator	Score
Metacritic	78/100

Review scores
Publication	Score
Destructoid	(Rice) 7.5/10 (Chester) 6/10
Edge	8/10
Eurogamer	(1-3) 9/10; 8/10
Famitsu	36/40
GamePro	4/5
GameSpot	7/10
GameSpy	3.5/5
GameZone	8/10
IGN	(5-12) 8.5/10; 8.4/10 (1-4) 7/10
PlayStation: The Official Magazine	3.5/5
Variety	(average)

Siren: Blood Curse received "generally favorable reviews", according to the review aggregation website Metacritic. IGN praised the game's "increasingly suspenseful set of chapters and cutscenes, frightening jumps and gameplay sequences", but criticized some of the gameplay's aspects. While reviewing the first chapter of the game, Eurogamer stated that "Siren: Blood Curse is the best thing to appear in the genre in a very long time". GameSpot's Carolyn Petit praised the sight jacking mechanic, while noting repetition in locations and controls. In Japan, Famitsu gave the game a score of all four nines for a total of 36 out of 40. 1001 Video Games You Must Play Before You Die included Siren: Blood Curse as one of its titles.
