= Doraemon: Nobita and the Birth of Japan 2016 =

2016 film by Shinnosuke Yakuwa

Doraemon the Movie: Nobita and the Birth of Japan 2016
- Theatrical release poster

Japanese name
- Kanji: 映画ドラえもん 新・のび太の日本誕生
- Literal meaning: Doraemon: Nobita and the Birth of Japan 2016
Transcriptions
- Revised Hepburn: Eiga Doraemon Shin • Nobita no Nippon Tanjō
- Directed by: Shinnosuke Yakuwa
- Screenplay by: Shinnosuke Yakuwa
- Based on: Doraemon by Fujiko F. Fujio
- Produced by: Momoko Kawakita; Shingo Namerikawa; Kirika Tsuruza; Hitoshi Ono; Rena Takahashii; Takuji Yamada; Kenji Yoshida
- Starring: Wasabi Mizuta; Megumi Ōhara; Yumi Kakazu; Subaru Kimura; Seki Tomokazu; Kotono Mitsuishi; Yasunori Matsumoto; Chiaki; Ryōko Shiraishi; Hōchū Ōtsuka
- Cinematography: Takashi Suehiro
- Edited by: Toshihiko Kojima
- Music by: Kan Sawada
- Production company: Shin-Ei Animation
- Distributed by: Toho
- Release date: March 5, 2016 (Japan)
- Running time: 104 minutes
- Country: Japan
- Language: Japanese
- Box office: $58.4 million

Doraemon the Movie: Nobita and the Birth of Japan 2016 (映画ドラえもん 新・のび太の日本誕生, Eiga Doraemon Shin • Nobita no Nippon Tanjō) is a 2016 Japanese animated science fiction adventure film written and directed by Shinnosuke Yakuwa. It is the 36th feature film of Doraemon franchise. It is a remake of the 1989 film Doraemon: Nobita and the Birth of Japan.

The film was released in Japan on 5 March 2016 and released in United States on 2 July 2016.

It was adapted into a Nintendo 3DS video game, released March 3, 2016. It is available in the iTunes store with English subtitles in Malaysia and Singapore, and on DVD and Blu-ray with English subtitles in Hong Kong. This film was the 7th highest grossing Japanese film of the year. In September 2016, Indonesia's Film Censorship Board listed and registered both Shin Godzilla and Doraemon: Nobita and the Birth of Japan 2016.

== Plot ==
The movie starts with a boy who belongs to prehistoric times hunting a fish. Returning home he finds it destroyed and cries out in despair before suddenly being captured into time vortex. Meanwhile, in the 21st century in Tokyo, Nobita wants to run away from his home due to his mom always scolding him for getting a 0 on exams, as depicted many times in various episodes. As a result of failing to find an ideal home, Nobita decides to make a makeshift place to live, however due to land property ownership laws he fails to find a suitable location. At the same time, Shizuka, Gian, Suneo and Doraemon also want to run away from their homes as they feel their parents have been working them too hard (with the exception of Doraemon, who leaves as the family has been requested to take care of a hamster which Doraemon thinks looks too much like a mouse, an animal he hates). Nobita suggests that they should go back in time to live in a place before humans existed. The group agrees with him and travel to Japan 70,000 years ago.

To settle in, Doraemon assigns everyone a ministry. Nobita, who is given the ministry of pets, mixes the genes of different animals and creates a Pegasus, a Dragon and a Griffin. At night, the group eats the supper and decides to return home and visit here another day. On the next day, Doraemon is upset to find his dorayaki has been eaten, deducing it was the hamster. As he sets off in a rage, Gian, Shizuka and Suneo come and is attacked by the mysterious boy from the start of the movie. Gian fights with him and manages to overpower him. At first they are annoyed as they believe Doraemon and Nobita have told someone else about their secret but it quickly turns to confusion as they find the spear the boy holds is made of real stone. Nobita's mom then comes up the stairs and in a panic, the group take the boy with them to the past.

They take the boy into the cave and when he regains consciousness, Shizuka gives him food and Doraemon uses the translation taro in order to understand him. He tells them that his name is Kukuru and he belongs to the Light Tribe (living in a village equivalent to present-day He County, Anhui, China), who got attacked by the Dark Tribe and enslaved all of his people. Nobita and Doraemon decide to help him. Kukuru is mistrustful as they are led by a powerful "King of the Spirits", Gigazombi, but as Doraemon demonstrates the secret gadgets he has, Kukuru hails him as a god much to the annoyance of Doraemon. Pegasus, Dragon and Griffin are left behind as Doraemon fears arriving on them will cause too much of a scene, and they trace the Dark Tribe using Takekoputa, eventually finding and fighting them. However their shaman proved to be strong and gave them a challenge; his ability to generate force fields is worrying to Doraemon and he wonders how an object in the Stone Age has such powers. Using the Hirarimando Doraemon reflects the shaman's attacks back to him, seemingly destroying it. They take the tribe to Japan to give them a peaceful place to live and return to the 21st century, but Nobita is worried as his pets were nowhere to be seen.

The next day, Doraemon finds with some help from Dorami that the shaman is made of a type of ceramic that has shape memory and can restore itself. The Light Tribe is still in danger, so they once again return to prehistoric times. Unfortunately they were too late and the Dark Tribe had already taken the Light Tribe. Gigazombi appears as the hologram, challenging the protagonists to come to him and face him, which they do so. Unfortunately on the way they encounter a blizzard and Nobita is separated from the group, but luckily he is found by his pets. They have a reunion.

The group without Nobita travels on to Gigazombi's hideout where they find the Light Tribe being forced to work. Gian jumps down from their hiding spot but Doraemon quickly stops time, knowing they will need to move tactfully. He uses the Toorinuge Hoop to reach the surface, but is confused by the subspace tunnel curving and the exit being in an unexpected location, a room with historic electronics everywhere. Gigazombi then appears and Doraemon is confused since time is supposedly stopped, which the former says he removed. Doraemon then realises that Gigazombi is a time traveler, like them, although he changes history for his own benefit. Gigazombi reveals that he also plans to destroy the subspace time tunnel so that no one may enter or leave this time period again. They battle for a while, but Doraemon is easily defeated as it turns out Gigazombi is from the 23rd century, making Doraemon's 22nd century gadgets outdated in comparison.

Doraemon, Shizuka, Suneo and Gian are captured and face a saber-toothed cat, but Nobita and his pets come in and rescue them just in time. They disable the machine that will destroy subspace and just in time, Time Patrol and Dorami come and arrest Gigazombi. Dorami says that she found out the shape-memory ceramic the shaman was made from is manufactured in the 23rd century, which made her worried and thus called Time Patrol. Nobita and the rest of the group prepare to return to their own time although a tearful farewell is first said to Pega, Draco and Gri – because they are fantastical animals, they cannot accompany Nobita and must be moved to a zoo. Nobita eventually relents and says goodbye to his pets.

In the epilogue, Nobita's mom tells Nobita that he's going to be late for school, but gives him 10 more minutes of sleep as she finds out he was working on his homework.

== Cast ==
Character	Japanese voice actor
Doraemon; Dorazombie	Wasabi Mizuta
Nobita Nobi	Megumi Ōhara
Shizuka Minamoto	Yumi Kakazu
Takeshi "Gian" Gōda	Subaru Kimura
Suneo Honekawa	Tomokazu Seki
Tamako Nobi (Nobita's mother)	Kotono Mitsuishi
Nobisuke Nobi (Nobisuke's father)	Yasunori Matsumoto
Mrs. Gōda (Takeshi's mother)	Miyako Takeuchi
Dorami	Chiaki
Kukuru	Ryoko Shiraishi
Tsuchidama	Hiroshi Yanaka
Tajikara	Koji Ishii
Koiyame	Aya Hisakawa
Pega	Hiroki Shimowada
Gri	Miyako Ito
Draco	Yuki Kaida
Time Patrol Corps	Aya Hisakawa; Miki Fukui; Keicho Yuka
Time Machine	Miyako Ito
Landowner	Kouji Ishii
Gigazombie	Houchu Ōtsuka

== Theme song ==
The ending theme is titled Sora e, performed by Masayoshi Yamazaki.

== Guest characters ==
Kukuru
Voiced by: Ryoko Shiraishi

Kukuru is a hikari family boy. Been swallowed by the disturbance of the space-time will be a time slip to Japan of the modern, where become Nobita us and meeting friends. Unlike the original and older movies, wearing many also trinkets on the body. Face and quiet are to become close to a teenager style. It is also known that Eri Kasuga from Chimpui is a descendant of Kukuru, thus, he is the ancestor of Eri.

Hikari group

70,000 years ago primitive man tribe who were in the world. In the trailer, elders, Tarane, Tajikara appeared.

Gigazombi
Voiced by: Yoshitada Otsuka

Immortal spirit king. There are tiger of such animal next to the throne. Wearing under the darkness group and Tsuchidama. The color of the mask is, in addition top of skeleton that is different from the previous work has been changed to something like a corner.

Darkness group
Voiced by: Hiroshi Tanahashi & Togi Makabe, Yoshio Kojima

It appeared in the recollection of cucule. Unlike the original and previous work, they are marked with a pattern on the face and both shoulders. Tsuchidama Living under the Gigazonbi clay figures. In this work it is different from the original older movie because street plurality of individuals is to appear. In addition, although it was the same design all in the original, it has a different design for each piece in this work.

== Production ==
On July 10, 2015, Fujiko Pro revealed a new remake of 1989's Doraemon: Nobita and the Birth of Japan, which has the highest ticket sales of any Doraemon film to date. On 15 July 2015, the film official website was opened. On 21 October 2015, Voice actor group was announced.

== Box office ==
Debuting on 374 screens with Toho distributing, Doraemon: Nobita and the Birth of Japan 2016 earned $5.6 million on 544,816 admissions in its first weekend and ranked 1 on Japanese Box Office. It stayed at the top of Japanese box office for two more weeks, earning a further $14.4 million in the process. It fell to second position in its fourth weekend, behind Assassination Classroom movie, and remained on the second spot the following weekend. It dropped to third spot in its sixth weekend with a weekend gross of $1 million.

Here is a table which shows the box office of this movie of all the weekends in Japan:

#	Rank	Weekend	Weekend gross	Total gross till current weekend
1	1	March 5–6	¥637,035,600 ($5.60 million)	¥637,035,600 ($5.60 million)
2	1	March 12–13	¥485,035,600 ($4.26 million)	¥1,254,423,800 ($11.0 million)
3	1	March 19–20	¥399,929,400 ($3.59 million)	¥1,828,542,300 ($16.0 million)
4	3	March 26–27	¥270,888,500 ($2.4 million)	¥2,552,345,400 ($22.6 million)
5	2	April 2–3	¥234,597,000 ($2.1 million)	¥3,382,985,800 ($30.1 million)
6	3	April 9–10	¥115,511,200 ($1.1 million)	¥3,778,527,800 ($33.8 million)
7	5	April 16–17	¥77,127,700 ($709,000)	¥3,884,690,900 ($34.8 million)
8	11	April 23–24	¥35,000,000 ($305,000)	¥3,930,000,000 ($35.2 million)
9	13	April 30-May 1	¥44,000,000 ($404,000)	¥3,980,000,000 ($35.5 million)
10	15	May 7–8	¥55,000,000 ($505,000)	¥4,050,000,000 ($36.1 million)
11	25	May 14–15	¥14,000,000 ($102,000)	¥4,070,000,000 ($36.3 million)
FINAL TOTAL				$58.4 million (Note: This film's gross of Japan have been changed from $36.7 million to $41 million because the value of yen has been increased as of September 2016.)

This film ran in theatres from March 5 – May 15 (72 days) in theatres of Japan.

This film grossed ¥4.12 billion and beat the 33rd installment, Doraemon: Nobita's Secret Gadget Museum which grossed ¥3.98 billion. This film could not beat Doraemon: Nobita's Secret Gadget Museum in its admissions as this film got 3.63 million admissions but the above mentionsd film got 3.66 million admissions.

The film grossed US$8.14 million on its opening weekend in China. It has grossed CN¥103.5 million ($15.6 million) in China by its twenty-ninth day of release. This film ran in theatres of China for 29 days and ended its theatrical run on 19 August 2016.

This film was released in Turkey on 22 July 2016 and grossed $120,000.

In Hong Kong, this film has grossed HK$6.6 million ($805,000).

In South Korea, this film has grossed $446,000 and in Italy, this film has grossed $522,000.

== See also ==
- List of Doraemon films
