= The Booth =

- DVD cover
- Directed by: Yoshihiro Nakamura
- Written by: Yoshihiro Nakamura
- Produced by: Fumiaki Furuya
- Starring: Ryuta Sato; Maiko Asano; Masaki Miura; Mai Takahashi
- Cinematography: Nouaki Sasaki; Akihiro Kawamura
- Edited by: Hiroshi Matsuo
- Music by: Kyō Nakanishi
- Distributed by: Tartan Asian Extreme
- Release date: November 5, 2005 (Japan)
- Running time: 74 minutes
- Country: Japan
- Language: Japanese

The Booth (Japanese: ブース, Hepburn: Bûsu) is a 2005 Japanese horror film directed by Yoshihiro Nakamura and starring Ryuta Sato. The film was released on DVD, in the United States, on May 23, 2006, distributed by the Tartan Video under their label Tartan Asian Extreme.

== Cast ==
- Ryuta Sato
- Maiko Asano
- Masaki Miura
- Mai Takahashi
