= Adventures of Kotetsu =

Japanese manga series

小鉄の大冒険 (Kotetsu no Daibōken)
- Manga
- Written by: Minoru Tachikawa
- Published by: Wanimagazine
- Original run: June 1992 – June 2001
- Volumes: 9
- Original video animation
- Directed by: Yuji Moriyama
- Produced by: Tetsuya Ikeda
- Music by: Kuniaki Haishima
- Studio: Daia
- Licensed by: NA: ADV Films
- Released: December 13, 1996 – January 10, 1997
- Episodes: 2

Adventures of Kotetsu (小鉄の大冒険, Kotetsu no Daibōken) is a manga series written and illustrated by Minoru Tachikawa. The series was adapted into a two-episode OVA series by Daia in 1996. It was licensed by ADV Films.

== Characters ==
Linn Suzuki (鈴木 凛, Suzuki Rin) / Kotetsu (小鉄)
Voiced by: Yuko Miyamura (Japanese); Kay Hest (English)
A master of "kirohatchi", Speaks in a exaggeratedly eloquent fashion.

Miho Kuon (久遠 美保, Kuon Miho)
Voiced by: Kikuko Inoue (Japanese); Shawn Sides (English)
A detective who takes Linn in.

Tatsuya Mikado (御門 竜也)
Voiced by: Kikuchi Masami (Japanese); Mark Lovell (English)
Linn's pining love interest, shy and socially awkward.

Kagari (かがり)
Voiced by: Mako Hyoudou (Japanese); Claire Hamilton (English)
A seductive dryad who smells of olive trees, she serves as the main antagonist of the two OVA's.

Azami Daimonji (大文字 あざみ, Daimonji Azami)
Voiced by: Kae Araki (Japanese); Bernadette Nason (English)

Kenichi Mukai (向井 賢一, Mukai Ken'ichi)
Voiced by: Shinichiro Miki (Japanese); Greg Dorchak (English)

== Eroge ==
An eroge and sequel to the anime titled Kotetsu no Daibouken was released on April 19, 1996, for the PC-9800 by T2 Co., Ltd, a former subsidiary of KSS.
