= Keiichiro Toyama =

Japanese video game designer

Keiichirō Toyama
- 外山 圭一郎
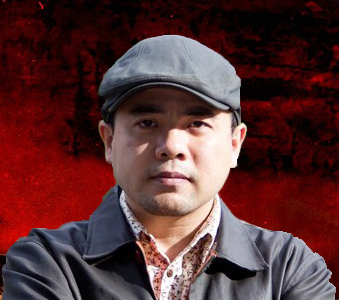
- Born: 1970 (age 55–56); Miyazaki Prefecture, Japan
- Education: Tokyo Zokei University
- Occupations: Video game writer, designer, producer
- Years active: 1994–present
- Employer(s): Konami (1994–1999); Sony Interactive Entertainment (1999–2020); Bokeh Game Studio (2020–present)
- Known for: Silent Hill; Siren; Gravity Rush; Slitterhead

Keiichirō Toyama (外山 圭一郎, Toyama Keiichirō; born 1970) is a Japanese video game director and designer. He is the creator of the Silent Hill, Siren and Gravity Rush franchises.

== Biography ==
Toyama was born in 1970 in Miyazaki Prefecture, and studied art in Tokyo Zokei University. After graduating he joined Konami in 1994 as a graphic artist. He was the graphic designer for the Sega CD version of Snatcher and character designer for the PlayStation version of International Track & Field, and after that he created the Silent Hill series. The game was successful and produced various sequels, but Toyama left Team Silent in 1999 after the first game was launched to join Japan Studio afterwards to work on the Siren series. One of the first games he worked on in Sony was Yoake no Mariko, a collaboration with Spümcø, where he was a main designer, modeling director, tool editor. He directed the video games Siren (2003) and its sequel Forbidden Siren 2 (2006). In 2008, Toyama released Siren: Blood Curse, a reimagining of the original Siren game. Toyama then worked on the PlayStation Vita game Gravity Rush, released in 2012. A sequel, Gravity Rush 2, was released on January 19, 2017, in Japan.

Toyama left Sony Japan Studio in September 2020. He has founded Bokeh Game Studio alongside Kazunobu Sato and Junya Okura, both of whom worked on the Siren series, on August 13, 2020. When asked about what prompted the move, Toyama stated that he had been inspired by fellow designer Fumito Ueda who had related much of his experiences founding genDESIGN to Toyama. Toyama announced that he plans on returning to the horror genre, with a debut game inspired in particular by film directors Wong Kar-wai and Fruit Chan. The game, Slitterhead, was formally revealed during The Game Awards 2021.

== Works ==
Year	Game title	Publisher	Role
1994	Snatcher	Konami	Graphic designer (Sega CD version)
1995	Tokimeki Memorial: Forever With You	Konami	Character CG (PlayStation version)
1996	International Track & Field	Konami	Character designer, motion editor (PlayStation version)
1999	Silent Hill	Konami	Director, scenario writer, background designer
2001	Yoake no Mariko	Sony Computer Entertainment	Main designer, modeling director, tool editor
2003	Siren	Sony Computer Entertainment	Director, writer
2006	Forbidden Siren 2	Sony Computer Entertainment	Director, designer, writer
2008	Siren: Blood Curse	Sony Computer Entertainment	Director, designer, writer
2012	Gravity Rush	Sony Computer Entertainment	Director, designer, writer, game concept
2015	Gravity Rush Remastered	Sony Computer Entertainment	Director, designer, writer, game concept
2017	Gravity Rush 2	Sony Interactive Entertainment	Director, initial game design and story
2024	Slitterhead	Bokeh Game Studio	Creative director, initial game design and story, internal creature designer and motion actor

== Awards ==
In 2012 Toyama received the outstanding performance award at the 16th Japan Media Arts Festival and the excellence award at the Japan Game Awards for his work on Gravity Rush.
