= Kuniaki Haishima =

Japanese musician and composer

Kuniaki Haishima 蓜島邦明
- Born: January 30, 1953 (age 73)
- Origin: Japan
- Occupations: Musician, composer

Kuniaki Haishima (蓜島邦明) is a Japanese musician and composer. He is known for his music in several anime and tokusatsu shows, as well as video games, films and dorama. His compositions for the Fuji TV series Tales of the Unusual are his most famous work, though he also composed the soundtrack for Metroid: Other M for the Wii, for which he is known abroad.

== Works ==
=== Anime ===
List of works in anime
Year	Series	Crew role	Notes	Source
1996-1997	Adventures of Kotetsu	Music	OAV	
1998	Neo Ranga	Music		
1998	Gundam: Mission to the Rise	Music	TV special	
1998	Spriggan	Music	feature film	
1998–2000	Master Keaton	Music	TV series and OVAs	
1998-1999	Gasaraki	Music		
1999	Legend of Himiko	Music		
1999-2000	Blue Gender	Music	TV series	
2000-2001	Legendary Gambler Tetsuya	Music	TV series	
2001-2002	Alien Nine	Music	TV special	
2001	Run=Dim	Music	TV series	
2002	Blue Gender: The Warrior	Music	Feature film	
2002-2004	Macross Zero	Music	OVA	
2003	Dokkoida?!	Music	TV series	
2003	Requiem from the Darkness	Music		
2004-2005	Monster	Music, Theme Song Arrangement, Theme Song Composition		
2008	My-Otome 0: S.ifr	Music		

=== Live action ===
List of works in live-action television, tokusatsu and film
Year	Series	Crew role	Notes	Source
1993	Tokyo Babylon 1999	Music		
2000	Tales of the Unusual	Music	with Toshihiko Sahashi	
2004	Kagen no Tsuki	Music	Last Quarter	
2005	Shi15ya	Music		
2006-2007	Kamen Rider Kabuto	Music		
2006	Forbidden Siren	Music		
2006	Mushishi	Music		
2011	Taro no To	Music		
2013	Cult	Music		
2016	Kamen Rider Amazons	Music		

=== Video games ===
List of works in video games
Year	Series	Crew role	Notes	Source
1995	Ultraman	Music	PS	
1996	Maria Museum curse of MA.RI.A 人形館の呪い	Music		
1997	Kowloon's Gate	Music	PS1	
1999	Record of Lodoss War ロードス島戦記	Music	DC	
2004	Dokodemoissyo - Toro and the shooting star - どこでもいっしょ -トロと流れ星-	Music	PS	
2006	Forbidden Siren 2	Music	PS2	
2010	Metroid: Other M	Music	Wii	
