= Otoha (actress) =

Japanese actress (born 1981)

- 乙葉
- Born: January 28, 1981 (age 45); Ikeda Town, Kitaazumi District, Nagano Prefecture
- Occupations: Actress; tarento; gravure idol; singer
- Years active: 1999–present
- Agent: Knot Company
- Spouse: Takashi Fujii (m. 2005)
- Website: Official website

Otoha (乙葉, Otoha; born January 28, 1981) is a Japanese actress, tarento, and former gravure idol.

== Filmography ==
=== Television drama ===
- Kangoku no Ohimesama (2017), Itabashi Harumi
- Omukae Shibuya-kun (2024), Haruka Shibuya
- Legal Beat: The Courtroom Comeback (2026), Eriko Himeno

=== Theatrical animation ===
- Let's Go! Anpanman: Kokin-chan and the Blue Tears (2006), Kokin-chan (First voice)
- Gekijōban Dōbutsu no Mori (2006), Peliko
