= Syzygys =

Japanese organ-violin duo

Syzygys is a Japanese duo composed of Hitomi Shimizu on 43-tone organ and vocals and Hiromi Nishida on violin, keyboards, and vocals. Formed in 1985, they play "microtonal pop music", specifically just intonation in the form of Harry Partch's 43-tone scale. Nishida studied Arabic style violin with Abdo Dagir. The group's 2003 album, Eyes on Green, recorded live in 1988, also features guitarist Imahori Tsuneo and bassist Shiina Tatsuto.

They have released albums on Tzadik Records, including Syzygys: Complete Studio Recordings (2003, Tzadik #7240). György Ligeti was interested in their music, and he mentions their track "Fauna Grotesque" in a sketch.

Syzygys provided the score for the 2020 film Dick Johnson Is Dead.
