= Shawn Sides =

American actress

Shawn Sides is a co-producing artistic director of Rude Mechanicals alongside fellow actress (and also fellow artistic director in the same troupe) Lana Lesley (incidentally, both Sides and Lesley also appeared in Nadia: The Secret of Blue Water.) She is also an American voice actress notable for the work she did for ADV Films now-defunct Monster Island Studio in Austin, Texas from 1998 through 2005.

== Filmography ==
=== Anime roles ===
- 801 T.T.S. Airbats - Sakura Saginomiya
- Adventures of Kotetsu - Miho Kuon
- Devil Lady - Jun Fudou/Devil Lady
- Final Fantasy: Unlimited - Lisa Pacifist
- Happy Lesson - Fumitsuki Nanakorobi
- Lost Universe - Merina
- Magical Play - Ketchup
- Magical Play 3D - Ketchup
- My Dear Marie - Human Marie
- Nadia: The Secret of Blue Water - King
- Nadia of the Mysterious Seas - King (Flashback Scenes)
- Petite Princess Yucie - Chawoo (Chow)
- Wedding Peach - Marilyn
- Zone of the Enders - Additional voices
- Zone of the Enders: Idolo - Additional voices

=== Video Game roles ===
- DC Universe Online - Fire
