= Forbidden Siren 2 =

2006 video game

- Developer: Sony Computer Entertainment Japan
- Publisher: Sony Computer Entertainment
- Director: Keiichiro Toyama
- Producer: Takafumi Fujisawa
- Artist: Isao Takahashi
- Writers: Naoko Sato; Keiichiro Toyama
- Composer: Kuniaki Haishima
- Platform: PlayStation 2
- Release: JP: February 9, 2006; AU: June 28, 2006; EU: August 4, 2006
- Genres: Survival horror, stealth
- Mode: Single-player

Forbidden Siren 2 (Note: Known in Japan as Siren 2 (Japanese: サイレン２, Hepburn: Sairen Tsū)) is a 2006 survival horror stealth game developed and published by Sony Computer Entertainment for the PlayStation 2. It is a sequel to 2003's Siren (Forbidden Siren) and was not released in North America. A film inspired by the game but featuring a different plot and characters, Siren, was released that same year.

The game tells the story of several characters who become trapped on Yamijima Island, off the coast of mainland Japan. In 1976, during a blackout, the entire population of the island disappeared without a trace or explanation. Twenty-nine years later, in 2005, a journalist is visiting the island to conduct research for an article when the ferry he and a small group of other passengers are on capsizes. Shortly after this, a group of soldiers crash land on the island. The game is played from the perspective of these characters, and out of chronological order, as the protagonists attempt to survive the island's monsters and discover its mystery.

== Gameplay ==
Like its predecessor, Forbidden Siren 2 is divided into numerous scenarios, organized chronologically in a table called the "Link Navigator". In order to complete a scenario, the player must accomplish a primary mission objective that usually involves reaching an exit point, finding an item, or subduing certain enemies (called shibito (屍人, shibito; lit. "corpse people") and the yamibito (闇人, yamibito; lit. "darkness people")). Objectives are interconnected via a butterfly effect, and a character's actions in one scenario can trigger a secondary objective in another.

The game's defining feature is "sightjacking," to see and hear from the perspectives of nearby shibito, yamibito, humans, and other creatures. The process is similar to tuning into a radio frequency, with the left analog stick serving as the dial. The clarity of each target depends on the distance from the player, and the direction of the dial depends on the target's orientation to the player. Once a signal is found, it can be assigned to one of the controller's four face buttons to switch between signals. Via sightjacking, the player can discover a shibito's position, patrol route, locations and items of interest. However, the player is unable to move while sightjacking and is vulnerable to attack. In Forbidden Siren 2, the sightjack system was altered to allow automatic sightjacking to the closest enemy without having to tune into its frequency. Character-specific features have been added, such as Shu's ability to move while sightjacking, Ikuko's ability to control sightjacked enemies, and Akiko's ability to reveal psychic impressions from the past when sightjacking in certain areas.

Also added is the ability to crouch-walk, a proximity alert that warns the player of nearby enemies, a hint system that guides the player to the current mission objective, three selectable difficulty levels, and an optional first-person mode. Context-sensitive interactions now require only a single button press rather than having to bring up the list menu, and bringing up the menu for common interactions no longer pauses the game. Important items remain in the inventory if a player is killed instead of needing to be reattained. The combat system has also been overhauled; characters can now use a three-hit combo attack and attack barehanded. Guns can be used as melee weapons, and there are many more weapons available.

The sequel also introduces a new enemy type - the yamibito, who are more resilient, aggressive, and intelligent. They are repelled by light, and can be weakened by a flashlight or turning on the lights in a room. Like the shibito, a yamibito can be defeated, but is revived when a yamirei (闇霊, yamirei; lit. "darkness spirit") re-enters the corpse. Eliminating the yamirei (who are also intolerant to light) renders the yamibito unconscious indefinitely, but yamibito will not fall for distractions that may work on shibito, and are much harder to defeat in combat.

As in the original, items scattered through scenarios give the player insight into the story. Once obtained, these items are collected in a catalog called "Archives" and can be viewed at any time. The catalog has been expanded to include additional media types such as audio, video, and other interactive supplements.

== Plot ==
Long ago, the water deity Mother was imprisoned beneath the Earth when light was created, while her mate Otoshigo fled to the ocean depths. Seeking to return to the surface, Mother sends out avatars—possessed humans under her control—to open the seven gates to the Underworld that hold her captive, all located on Yamijima Island.

In 1976, a severed undersea cable cuts all power to Yamijima. Four-year-old Shu Mikami finds a young woman, Kanae, washed ashore; she closely resembles his dead mother, and she moves in with his family. Kanae is an avatar of Mother, sent to manipulate Shu into opening the gates, but the villagers grow suspicious and catch her killing Shu's father. Fleeing with Shu, Kanae is cornered on a pier that collapses, and Shu watches her drown—a trauma that blinds him. In revenge, Mother destroys the villagers with a tsunami, and the island's entire population vanishes without explanation.

In 2005, five outsiders travel by boat to the abandoned island: the now-adult Shu, seeking his lost memories; journalist Mamoru Itsuki, investigating the 1976 disappearances; Soji Abe and Akiko Kiyota, fleeing an accusation of murder; and dockworker Ikuko Kifune, inexplicably drawn to the island. A red tsunami capsizes their boat and scatters them. Also stranded are three soldiers whose helicopter crashes, a police officer, and Ichiko Yagura, a schoolgirl aboard a ferry that vanished decades earlier and has reappeared in the present. The villagers who disappeared in 1976 have likewise returned, now as shibito.

As the survivors navigate the island across its folded timeline, a girl named Yuri—another form of Mother—leads Mamoru to an abandoned amusement park and manipulates him into opening the seven gates. Ikuko breaks Mother's hold on him, but Shu, seeing Mother in Kanae's form, surrenders himself to her. With the gates open, Mother is freed and begins spawning monstrous yamirei, which convert the island's shibito into yamibito. Ichiko, revealed to be possessed by Otoshigo, kills the police officer.

The survivors fight to contain the outbreak. Ikuko destroys the gates to halt the flood of creatures, and daylight destroys the light-sensitive yamirei. Investigating the site of the 1976 tragedy, Akiko frees the soul of Shu's transformed father, but a vision overwhelms her and she becomes another of Mother's avatars, taking Kanae's form. Mamoru concludes that the island's reality is a false copy in which time has folded back on itself, sustained by a great tower where the false and real worlds intersect—the point through which Mother intends to cross over.

Mamoru and Ikuko ascend the tower and are pulled into Mother's realm. As they battle her, Akiko regains control of herself and kills herself with a sacred artifact, wounding Mother and letting the pair destroy her. A final tsunami replaces the false reality with the real one and purges the timeline; with Mother erased from history, Soji's murder accusation never occurred. Mamoru and Ikuko wash up alive on the pier at dawn, though Ikuko squints at the sunlight. In a final scene, Kyoya Suda, protagonist of the first game, arrives on Yamijima armed to destroy the monsters that remain.

== Development ==
Forbidden Siren 2 was developed by Project Siren, the same Sony Computer Entertainment Japan team responsible for the original, with Keiichiro Toyama returning as director, Isao Takahashi as art director, and Naoko Satō and Toyama writing. Toyama has said the first game had been conceived as a standalone work incorporating a large amount of experimental material, and that the sequel grew from ideas left over from that project together with requests from players for a follow-up. He characterised Siren as resting on three pillars—a Japanese-style horror game, an ensemble drama with many characters, and the sightjacking mechanic—and described the sequel as changing the recipe without altering that framework.

As with the first game, the team worked in a manner closer to a film or television production than a conventional game studio, photographing actors and physical props extensively and building the game's computer graphics from that photographic data rather than modelling everything from scratch; costumes, bloodied shibito clothing and other props were stored on racks in the development office, and staff travelled the country conducting on-site research at ruins and abandoned buildings. Ruins explorer Jun Kurihara, who had assisted on the first Siren, again joined the team for location research.

Takahashi identified three principal changes from the first game: the shift to an island setting, the addition of the yamibito as a second enemy type alongside the shibito, and the inclusion of a member of the Japan Self-Defense Forces as a playable character, the last of which introduced a more offensive, combat-oriented style of play that shaped the design of the game's maps. The move from the first game's wooden mountain-village ruins to an environment of concrete and steel was intended to distinguish the sequel visually and, producer Takafumi Fujisawa suggested, to present a setting that Western players might find more recognisable than the first game's distinctly Japanese ruins.

The island of Yamijima was modelled principally on Gunkanjima (Battleship Island), an abandoned former coal-mining island off Nagasaki whose coal mine had closed in 1974. Because access was prohibited at the time, the team could only approach it by boat, supplementing what they saw with survey books and photographic collections of the island. Takahashi recalled being overwhelmed by the sight, describing how the island's silhouette at dawn resembled an ordinary city skyline until, drawing closer, he saw that no lights were on and the buildings were full of holes, calling the rows of huge dark structures "so strange". The "Hell Steps" staircase was recreated in the game from an accurate survey of the real steps on Gunkanjima. The team is reported to have taken some 30,000 photographs across the locations they visited. Other real sites used as references, according to the game's official art book, included Ōkunoshima, a Hiroshima Prefecture island that had housed a wartime poison-gas facility; Kamine Park in Hitachi and the abandoned Kejonuma Leisure Land, for the game's amusement-park area; Manabeshima, for the fishing-village district; the Kamioka Mine in Gifu Prefecture, for Yamijima's gold mine and workers' housing; and the second Tokyo Bay sea fort, for the fort ruins. Many of Yamijima's district names derive from historical disappearances rather than the biblical names used in the first game—Aonoku from the Roanoke Colony, Seresu from the Mary Celeste, and Uryuga from the legendary sunken Japanese island of Uryū.

Advances in technology since the first game shaped the sequel's look. Takahashi noted that the two- megapixel digital cameras used during the first game's development had been succeeded by five- to six-megapixel models, allowing the team to capture far more surface detail when photographing materials for textures, and Toyama said at the 2005 Tokyo Game Show that the team aimed to push the PlayStation 2's visuals as far as they could go. The dissolving photographic facial expressions of the first game returned in more elaborate form: the head of each actor was photographed in some 22 basic expressions using a digital video camera, and these textures were blended and combined with jaw-bone movement on the 3D models. Character movement used motion capture, with layered animation distinguishing characters who shared the same base motions.

The yamibito—"darkness people"—were conceived not as reanimated corpses in the manner of the shibito but as otherworldly beings attempting to take human form, with subtly wrong features. Enemy designer Miki Takahashi has said Toyama showed her a still from Shūji Terayama's 1974 film Pastoral: To Die in the Country, depicting figures wrapped in black cloth, which shaped the yamibito's silhouettes; she reasoned that, fleeing the light, they would wrap themselves in whatever they found and carry umbrellas, and described picturing them as childlike and playful rather than malevolent. Isao Takahashi cited the cave crickets and house centipedes the team encountered during location research, and the creatures' shared aversion to light, as further reference points. A large pylon visible from across the island, its design drawn from William Blake's painting Jacob's Ladder, was devised as a unifying symbol comparable to the Mana cross of the first game, to convey that the separated characters occupied the same place and time.

=== Music ===
The score was composed by Kuniaki Haishima, replacing Hitomi Shimizu from the first game. Haishima, who had worked mainly in television, film and anime, was brought on through a prior working relationship with Fujisawa, and joined when the game was already partway through development, using the existing storyboards and imageboards to align his work with the team's vision. He aimed to evoke the muffled, enclosed atmosphere of a sealed-off island, and worked closely with Toyama to produce specific sensations at particular moments, such as mounting unease during an elevator sequence. The most prominent piece, "Konagihishoka", used a Japanese folk-song idiom in place of the Khöömei-influenced Mongolian style featured in the first game; Haishima noted that Japanese folk songs carry a gloomier character, drawing on themes such as depopulation. The lyrics were written by scenario and background lead Naoko Satō, with Haishima setting them to music.

== Release ==
Unlike the Western releases of the first game, which used only English audio, the overseas release of Forbidden Siren 2 included both Japanese and English audio. The game was released in Japan on February 9, 2006, followed by Australia and Europe later that year. It was not released in North America.

== Reception ==
Reception

Aggregate score
Aggregator	Score
Metacritic	74/100

Review scores
Publication	Score
Edge	7/10
Eurogamer	7/10
Famitsu	35/40
GamesMaster	83%
GamesTM	7/10
PlayStation Official Magazine – UK	7/10
PALGN	6.5/10
Play	7/10
PSM3	81%
VideoGamer.com	6/10
The Sydney Morning Herald	3.5/5

Forbidden Siren 2 received "average" reviews according to the review aggregation website Metacritic. Eurogamer's Kristan Reed said that the game improved on many of the problems of the predecessor (especially the difficulty level and trial-and-error nature of the gameplay), but simultaneously fell somewhat short of the original. VideoGamer.com's Chris Pickering (a fan of Siren) also said that the game removed many of the problems inherent to the original but fell short in many respects. In Japan, Famitsu gave it a score of three nines and one eight for a total score of 35 out of 40.

== Film ==
Siren (サイレン) is a film adaptation of Forbidden Siren 2. It was released in Japan on February 11, 2006, to coincide with the Japanese release of the game. Siren was directed by Yukihiko Tsutsumi and stars actors Yui Ichikawa, Leo Morimoto, Naoki Tanaka, Hiroshi Abe, Naomi Nishida, Suzuki Matsuo, Kyusaku Shimada, Mai Takahashi, and Jun Nishiyama.
