= Chiaki (television personality) =

Singer, actress, comedian, baby clothes designer (born October 26)

- 千秋
- Born: Chiaki Fujimoto (藤本 千秋); October 26; Maizuru, Kyoto, Japan
- Occupations: tarento; singer; voice actress; designer; impressionist; writer; lyricist
- Agent(s): Freelance (2024–present); Atomic Monkey (2025–present; affiliated as a voice actress)
- Notable work: Doraemon as Dorami
- Spouses: Shōzō Endō (m. 2002; div. 2007) Unnamed (m. 2016, divorced)
- Children: 1
- Parent: Katsuji Fujimoto (藤本 勝司) (father)

Comedy career
- Years active: 1991–present
- Medium: Owarai; TV
- Genre: Owarai
- Website: https://www.chiaki7.com/

Chiaki

YouTube information
- Channel: chiaki77777
- Years active: November 24, 2020 – present
- Genres: Blog; music

Chiaki (千秋), full name Chiaki Fujimoto (藤本 千秋, Fujimoto Chiaki; born October 26), is a Japanese tarento whose career ranges from singing, designing baby clothes, voice acting, and similar pursuits in the entertainment industry.

She is also well known for being the current voice actress of the character Dorami in the Doraemon franchise, starting with the Doraemon television anime series.

== Biography ==
Chiaki was born in Maizuru, Kyoto, on October 26 as the daughter of the chairman of Nippon Sheet Glass. Due to her father's job, she moved to Ichihara, Chiba soon after her birth. At the age of three, she started to take piano lessons, and continued for twelve years until she graduated from middle school. Although acting as a weird childish girl is her show business image, she is in fact known as a very well-mannered business person, as a result of exchanging letters with her mother who taught her etiquette when she was around 9 years old. At middle school she practiced kendo as part of a school club.

In 1991, she won first place in a tarento audition TV programme hosted by Fuji TV. Afterwards, she played Nontan's voice, and also sang the theme song for the same popular anime about a cat. She became a successful singer as the lead vocalist and guitarist of the electronic rock group "Pocket Biscuits", formed as an instant music trio in a popular reality show-like comedy programme hosted by a comedy duo "Utchan Nanchan" in 1995. The group's second single "Yellow Yellow Happy" sold a million copies. In 1998, the trio performed their hit number at the annual New Year's Eve music show Kōhaku Uta Gassen, with a rival music trio "Black Biscuits" featuring Taiwanese actress Vivian Hsu. They made two more million selling records but decided to cease their singing career in 2000.

Chiaki married Shōzō Endō, of the comedy duo Cocorico, in July 2002. However, they divorced in December 2007. They have a daughter, Iroha, who was born in 2003. As of 2024, it was revealed that the two became good friends and Chiaki was allowed by Endo to visit his home.

She has also performed voice acting roles, providing the voice of Blanky in the Japanese dub of the Brave Little Toaster film series, and the voice of Dorami in the 2005 Doraemon animated television series and the Doraemon feature films from 2007 to 2017.

== Personal life ==
=== Girlhood ===
Until the fifth grade, she describes herself as having been a "quiet and withdrawn child." Her report card would invariably read, "Be more proactive," and she dreaded Sports Day because she was never good at athletics. The turning point came during her fifth grade years when she met her homeroom teacher, who was also a music teacher. This teacher recognized her talent for the piano, assigning her as an accompanist and selecting her to be a model for playing the recorder, which helped her gain self-confidence for the very first time.

Her parents forbade her from reading manga because they believed it had a negative influence on children, however Doraemon was the only one she was allowed to read, with her parents deeming it "educational" and "harmless."

=== Character ===
Due to her petite, baby-faced childish appearance and high voice, she is often seen as much younger than her actual age. In addition to being a poisonous tongue, she sometimes talks to senior entertainers, including Ucchan Nanchan, as described below, without hesitation during the performance.

=== Lifestyle ===
She said she couldn't cook at all before she got married. Also, in the 1996 show Urinari on the "Chiaki vs Vivian Cooking Showdown" segment, she couldn't think of a general recipe for the theme of making prepared foods and single dishes. In the end, she used a lot of chocolate, biscuits, drops, marshmallows, etc. in the "arrangement" using her favorite sweets, but she was surprised by the referee Teruyoshi Uchimura because she put in an amount that can not be said to be a secret taste. The name of the mysterious dish that gives off its eerie sweet scent is Chiaki's "fantasy of light and darkness." In the end, Uchimura decided that Vivian, who cooked the right food, won. However, after getting married, she started cooking, and now she has a good skill. She's especially good at "eggplant and minced meat curry". From April 2005 to March 2006, she would appear on the mini cooking program Recipe for Happiness.

=== Family ===
Her former husband is comedian Shozo Endo (Cocorico). In the same year, they developed a romantic relationship because they were big fans of the Hanshin Tigers, and married in 2002. But five years later, they divorced in 2007 due to smoking cessation. Endo was often referred to as "Endo-kun", "husband", "our Endo" on television, and "husband" or "housekeeper" in books and blogs, but in private, he was called "comedy". After getting married, the couple's co-starring was realized only a few times because of Endo's intention to "separate work and private life". Therefore, most of the couple's co-starring after marriage was done in a stunning format that Chiaki appeared secretly to Endo. On March 22, 2016, she remarried a man who was a TBS TV employee 15 years younger, until they divorced on October 27, 2024.

=== Friendships ===
Vivian Hsu is a close friend of hers, partly because he had a hard time during the Urinari era. Also, Nanako Fujisaki, who also co-starred in Urinari, is on good terms, such as going to each other's house. However, during the Urinari era, the program staff told him that "Vivian's manager is annoying", and after being shocked, Chiaki began to take a naive attitude toward Vivian, and Vivian suddenly changed. It turned out later that this was a lie of the staff to fuel the opposition at the time of the confrontation, with Chiaki in Pocket Biscuits and Vivian in Black Biscuits as the main vocals, which was set to be in conflict at that time. Co-starring has rarely disappeared in the last few years, but she was very close friends with Ucchan Nanchan's Teruyoshi Uchimura and Kiyotaka Nanbara, who co-starred in "Urinari" for many years. Unnan is a senior entertainer, but he is calm and speaks with a tame mouth. She's also on good terms with Yoiko Kyaeen, who also competed in Urinari. Masaru Hamaguchi is a friend who goes out to play and exchanges emails on a regular basis. Occasionally Chiaki blogs about Hamaguchi as "girl's best friend".

Tetsuro Degawa, Keiichi Yamamoto (Gokuraku Tombo), and former Fuji TV announcer Shio Chino are said to be friends with dogs and monkeys (He doesn't really hate both).

The actress Kanan Nakahara was a junior high school classmate who kept an exchange diary at that time. Actor Tomoharu Hasegawa is a friend of the same grade in high school. The first entertainer friend she made was actress Nene Otsuka.

Naoko Ken is listed as a target entertainer because she has a good balance between work and family.

She has a friendship with Mayo Okamoto, Sae Isshiki, and YOU who are the same talent moms as her.

In terms of music, in addition to Mayo Okamoto, there are Tomomi Kahara and Nanase Aikawa.

She loves her own brand "Ribbon Casquette" and is on good terms with Rie Tomosaka, who is the same talent as herself. Having co-starred in a drama, she got along well with Yuki Uchida, and she went on a trip to Las Vegas alone. Good friends with illustrator Uni Ota. She says that the sense in his head fits perfectly. She has co-starred with Tomoe Shinohara several times on the program, but at the beginning she had a relationship of acquaintance. After that, she started playing from a sudden kick, and because they had many common hobbies, they became very close. She says on her blog that she often goes shopping with Becky at second-hand clothing stores such as Koenji. In addition to shopping, Becky also loves Chiaki's daughter, and the three of them play a lot. We also gave the three of them the unit name "Tiramisu Pudding". Also, Becky helped Chiaki's daughter practice walking well, and it was Becky, not Chiaki, who saw her for the first time. She was on good terms with Ai Iijima after co-starring on the show, and she was close enough to email him frequently.

== Filmography ==
=== Feature films ===
List of performances in feature films
Year	Title	Role	Notes	Source
2000	Natu: Dancing! Ninja Legend	Urinari All-Stars		

=== Television animation ===
==== Staff ====
List of staff work in television animation
Year	Title	Role	Notes	Source
1995	Lupin III: The Pursuit of Harimao's Treasure	Key Animation		
1995	Yanbō Ninbō Tonbō	Theme Song Lyrics		
2002	Barom-1	Main Character Design		
2002	Shin Seiki Den Mars	Character Design, Animation Director (OP chara), Key Animation (OP)		
2004	Battle B-Daman	Lyricist, Composer		

==== Voice actress ====
List of voice performances in television animation
Year	Title	Role	Notes	Source
1992	Nontan to Issho	Nontan	Debut anime voice role; Lead role	
1995	Kuma no Puutarou	Tanuki Girl		
2006	Doraemon	Dorami	Main role	
2008	attacked Kuma3	Yellow Kuma3		
2011	Sockie's Frontier Quest	Narration		

=== Theatrical animation ===
List of voice performances in theatrical animation
Year	Title	Role	Notes	Source
1997	My Father's Dragon	Rōjī		
2007	Doraemon: Nobita's New Great Adventure into the Underworld ~The Seven Magic Users~	Dorami		
2008	Doraemon: Nobita and the Green Giant Legend	Dorami		
2009	Doraemon: The New Records of Nobita, Spaceblazer	Dorami		
2010	Doraemon: Nobita's Great Battle of the Mermaid King	Dorami		
2011	Doraemon: Nobita and the New Steel Troops ~Winged Angels~	Dorami		
2012	Doraemon: Nobita and the Island of Miracles ~Animal Adventure~	Dorami		
2013	Doraemon: Nobita's Secret Gadget Museum	Dorami		
2016	Doraemon: New Nobita and the Birth of Japan	Dorami		
2017	Doraemon: Nobita's Great Adventure in the Antarctic Kachi Kochi	Dorami		
