= Siren (2006 film) =

- Film poster
- Directed by: Yukihiko Tsutsumi
- Screenplay by: Naoya Takayama
- Based on: Forbidden Siren 2 by Sony Computer Entertainment
- Produced by: Yoshiya Nagasawa; Kenzo Abe; Kei Haruna
- Starring: Yui Ichikawa; Leo Morimoto; Naoki Tanaka; Hiroshi Abe; Naomi Nishida
- Cinematography: Satoru Karasawa
- Edited by: Nobuyuki Ito
- Music by: Kuniaki Haishima
- Production companies: Toho; TV Asahi; Shogakukan; Hakuhodo DY Media Partners; Tokyo FM; Nippon Shuppan Hanbai; Lawson Ticket; Asahi Broadcasting Corporation; Mētele; Office Crescendo
- Distributed by: Toho
- Release date: February 11, 2006 (Japan)
- Running time: 87 minutes
- Country: Japan
- Language: Japanese
- Box office: ¥790 million

Siren (Japanese: サイレン, Hepburn: Sairen), also known as Forbidden Siren in English-speaking territories, is a 2006 Japanese supernatural psychological thriller mystery folk horror film directed by Yukihiko Tsutsumi. It is an adaptation and side story of the PlayStation 2 video game Forbidden Siren 2, part of the Siren survival horror series. The film also includes elements from the first game in the series. It stars Yui Ichikawa in her first leading role in a film, alongside Leo Morimoto, Naoki Tanaka and Hiroshi Abe. The plot follows a family that moves to a remote island with centuries' worth of folk history, where supernatural incidents start occurring. Koji Nozaki served as the film's VFX supervisor. Siren was theatrically released by Toho on February 11, 2006, in Japan, the same week of release as Forbidden Siren 2. The film's theme song is "SIREN" by Takkyu Ishino.

== Premise ==
Writer Shinichi moves from Tokyo to remote Yamijama island with his anxious teenage daughter Yuki and sickly young son Hideo, in order to care for his son away from the chaos of the city. The island is dark and foreboding, and 29 years prior, all its inhabitants vanished without a trace. The mystery of their disappearance was never solved. Yamijima also has a history of folklore that stretches back centuries and a mysterious steel tower looming in its center. Shinichi's family takes up residence in an ancient, creepy house. After settling into their new home, a disturbed neighbor arrives to give them a breakdown of the local ordinances. Chief among them: Never go outside when the island's air raid siren, housed within the tower, begins to wail. Most of the other locals are equally odd, treating the newcomers with coldness. Only neighbor Satomi and the island's doctor, Yutaka Minamida, seem normal. Soon supernatural incidents occur, and Yuki discovers undead creatures stalking her at night. As the terror closes in and the locals, as well as her father, exhibit increasingly erratic behavior, Yuki attempts to unveil the secrets of the island and help her family escape.

== Cast ==
- Yui Ichikawa as Yuki Amamoto
- Leo Morimoto as Shinichi Amamoto
- Naoki Tanaka as Yutaka Minamida
- Hiroshi Abe as Kei Tsuchida
- Naomi Nishida as Satomi
- Suzuki Matsuo as Azuma
- Kyusaku Shimada as Officer Yamanaka
- Jun Nishiyama as Hideo Amamoto
- Seiko Iwaido as Mysterious Girl in Red (credited as Mai Takahashi) – Iwaido also portrayed multiple characters in the video game.
- Junichi Gamou as Masakiyo Jinguji
- Isao Yatsu
- Kohei Mashiba

== Background ==
At the time of the film's production, the first game in the series had sold over 200,000 units in Japan, and more than 300,000 units in North America. In spite of this, its sequel Forbidden Siren 2 was never released in North America.

The film adaptation was announced in English-language press on September 29, 2005, close to the end of production. Yui Ichikawa, famous for her role as Chiharu in Ju-On: The Grudge and Ju-On: The Grudge 2, was cast in the lead role. Ichikawa had previously collaborated with director Tsutsumi on H2: Kimi to Ita Hibi, a television drama adaptation of the H2 manga.

== Release ==
Siren was theatrically released by Toho on February 11, 2006, in Japan.

Toho released the film on Region 2 DVD on September 22, 2006, in both a standard and two-disc special edition.

== Reception ==
Anthony Auzy wrote a generally positive review for Grimoireofhorror.com. He believed that the film looked good but could have better reproduced the game's atmosphere with a dirtier visual aesthetic. He also stated, "The movie still feels pretty faithful with many references to Japanese folklore and mana religion, the isolation of the countryside and their traditional customs, ancient artifacts, creepy revelations about reality and time [...]" He ultimately recommended the film to fans of the game and J-horror fans in general.

In a more negative review, Calvin McMillin wrote, "[...] the original video game certainly does have all the earmarks for a solid horror flick. Unfortunately, the filmmakers behind this sloppy movie adaptation aren’t able to muster anything remotely as scary as the source material." He stated that, in spite of the film's attempts to replicate the games, down to including events that occurred in the original game, "Unfortunately [...] Forbidden Siren is so devoid of any palpable sense of tension or dread that the whole thing just feels incredibly corny and fake."

== See also ==
- List of films based on video games
