= Ryuta Sato =

Japanese actor (born 1980)

- 佐藤 隆太
- Born: February 27, 1980 (age 46); Meguro, Tokyo, Japan
- Education: Nihon University Sakuragaoka High School; Nihon University College of Art
- Occupations: Actor, tarento
- Years active: 1999–present
- Agent: K Factory

Ryuta Sato (佐藤 隆太, Satō Ryūta; born February 27, 1980, in Meguro, Tokyo, Japan) is a Japanese actor and tarento represented by K Factory.

Sato graduated from Nihon University Sakuragaoka High School and Nihon University College of Art, where he was classmates with Kunihiro Suda. Sato is married and has three children.

== Filmography ==
=== TV series ===
Year	Title	Role	Notes	Ref.
2000	Ikebukuro West Gate Park	Masa Mori		
2002	Kisarazu Cat's Eye	Shingo "Master" Okabayashi		
2007	Fūrin Kazan	Heizo Yazaki	Taiga drama	
2008	Rookies	Koichi Kawato	Lead role	
2016	Naomi to Kanako	Tatsuro Hattori/Tatsuki Hayashi	Dual role	
2016	Hinoko	Toru Ikemoto		
2016	Boku no Yabai Tsuma	Seiichiro Soma		
2018	My Brother's Husband	Yaichi Origuchi		
2019	Scarlet	Soichiro Kusama	Asadora	
2022	Bakumatsu Aibō-den	Itō Kashitarō	Television film	
2022	The Sunflower Disappeared in the Rain	Masanori Ishioka	Miniseries	
2023	What Will You Do, Ieyasu?	Toyotomi Hidenaga	Taiga drama	
2023	Malice	Sota Maruyama	Lead role	
2025	Simulation: Defeat in the Summer of 1941	Akira Seko	Miniseries	

=== Films ===
Year	Title	Role	Notes	Ref.
2005	The Booth	Shingo Katsumata	Lead role	
2017	Fullmetal Alchemist	Maes Hughes		
2021	My Father's Tracks	Hiroyuki Kitamura		
2022	Ano Niwa no Tobira o Aketatoki			
2022	The Three Young-Men in Midnight: The Movie	Jumbo	Lead role	
2022	Fullmetal Alchemist: The Revenge of Scar	Maes Hughes		
2023	Shylock's Children	Makoto Takino		
2024	The Three Young-Men in Midnight: The Movie 2	Jumbo	Lead role	
2026	The Secret Battlefield	Akira Seko		

=== Dubbing ===
Live-action

Year	Title	Role	Dub for	Notes	Ref.
2022	The Batman	Mayor Don Mitchell	Rupert Penry-Jones		

Animation

Year	Title	Role	Notes	Ref.
2007	Ratatouille	Linguini		
