= Hitomi Shimizu =

Japanese musician and composer

Hitomi Shimizu (冷水ひとみ) is a keyboardist and composer of live action films, television programs, animated shorts and videogames. She is part of a musical duo with violinist Hiromi Nishida called Syzygys. Born in Nara, Japan, she majored in music composition at the Toho Gakuen School of Music. Her score for the 2001 comedy Waterboys, composed with Gakuji Matsuda, won the Japan Academy Prize for best film score. She also contributed music to the short film Mt. Head, by Kōji Yamamura, which won the top prize at the 27th Annecy International Animation Film Festival, and was nominated for the Academy Award for Best Animated Short Film. That film also won the Best Soundtrack Creation Award at the Clermont-Ferrand International Short Film Festival.

Shimizu has written music for several horror projects. She was the composer of the television series Gakkou no Kaidan (School Ghost Story) with Gary Ashiya. Following this series, both musicians composed for the PlayStation 2 title Siren. In 2008, Shimizu was the sole composer of the PlayStation 3 sequel Siren: Blood Curse. The new title features an arrangement of the Siren main theme played on an Ondes Martenot by musician Wakana Ichihashi. The song is voiced by singer Yula Yayoi.

== Games ==
- Siren (2003): Composer (in collaboration with Gary Ashiya)
- Siren: Blood Curse (2008): Composer
