= Sennen no Koi Story of Genji =

2001 Japanese film directed by Tonkō Horikawa

Sennen no koi: Hikaru Genji monogatari
- DVD cover
- Directed by: Tonkō Horikawa
- Written by: Akira Hayasaka
- Starring: Sayuri Yoshinaga; Yūki Amami; Haruma Miura
- Cinematography: Tatsuo Suzuki
- Edited by: Shin'ya Tadano
- Music by: Isao Tomita
- Production company: Asahi Broadcasting Corporation
- Distributed by: Asahi Hoso
- Release date: December 15, 2001 (Japan)
- Running time: 143 minutes
- Country: Japan
- Language: Japanese

Sennen no Koi: Hikaru Genji monogatari (Japanese: 千年の恋 ひかる源氏物語; literally Thousand Years of Love: The Tale of Shining Genji) is a 2001 Japanese film loosely based on the classical work of Heian-period Japanese literature The Tale of Genji, directed by Tonkō Horikawa and written by Akira Hayasaka.

== Cast ==
- Sayuri Yoshinaga as Murasaki Shikibu
- Yūki Amami as Hikaru Genji
- Haruma Miura
- Reiko Takashima
- Hirotarō Honda
- Junkichi Orimoto as Kakuzen
- Ken Watanabe as Fujiwara no Michinaga
- Mitsuko Mori

== Awards ==
- Japanese Academy Award for "Best Art Direction" - Yoshinobu Nishioka (2002)
