= Akiko Yagi =

Japanese announcer (born 1965)

- 八木 亜希子
- Born: June 24, 1965 (age 60); Yokohama, Kanagawa Prefecture, Japan
- Other names: Akko (あっこ); Yagi-chan (八木ちゃん)
- Education: Waseda University Faculty of Letters Department of Psychology
- Occupations: Announcer; tarento; television presenter; newscaster
- Years active: 1988–present
- Agents: Kyodo Television; Phonics
- Known for: Akashiya Santa no Shijō Saidai no Christmas Present Show; Mezamashi TV; Amachan; BS Fuji Live: Prime News
- Website: Official profile

Akiko Yagi (八木 亜希子, Yagi Akiko; born 24 June 1965, in Yokohama, Kanagawa Prefecture, Japan) is a Japanese free announcer, tarento, television presenter, newscaster, and actress. She is represented with Phonics. She is a former Fuji Television announcer from 1988 to 2000. She is the ambassador of Kanagawa Tourism.

== Appearances ==
=== Television ===
Year	Title	Notes	Ref.
1994–1998	Mezamashi TV	Presenter	
2015	Kikinikui Koto o Kiku		

=== Television drama ===
Year	Title	Role	Notes	Ref.
2016	Hiru no Saint Sake	Shoko Dozono		
2016	Sanada Maru	Ono no Otsū	Taiga drama	

=== Films ===
Year	Title	Role	Notes	Ref.
2001	Minna no Ie	Tamiko Iijima		
2025	Sato and Sato			

=== Radio ===
Year	Title	Notes	Ref.
2015–present	Akiko Yagi: Love & Melody	Host	

== See also ==
- Yūji Kuroiwa (Co-caster in Super News)
