= Takashi Fujii =

Japanese comedian and singer (born 1972)

- Born: March 10, 1972 (age 54); Toyonaka, Osaka, Japan
- Occupations: Comedian; actor; singer; presenter; music producer
- Years active: 1992–present
- Spouse: Otoha (m. 2005)

Notes
- Same year/generation as: Cocorico; Tomonori Jinnai; Kendo Kobayashi; Nakagawake

Takashi Fujii (藤井隆, Fujii Takashi), born March 10, 1972) is a Japanese entertainment personality who has performed as comedian, actor, singer, presenter, and music producer affiliated with the Japanese entertainment conglomerate Yoshimoto Kogyo and was the popular host of Matthew's Best Hit TV (as the character Matthew Minami (マシュー南, Mashū Minami), and various other related shows on TV Asahi. He was born in Toyonaka, Osaka.

On May 7, 2005, he officially announced his intention to marry Otoha (乙葉), a Japanese idol. They married on July 30, 2005, at the Grand Hyatt in Tokyo, with an audience of 340 guests including many famous Japanese personalities and celebrities. They have a daughter.

In 2022, he was the co-host of Love Is Blind: Japan, and host of the Audible podcast Matthew's Matthew: Matthew in Matthew's Room.

== Acting career ==
Takashi Fujii is most active as an actor and a comedic host.

In the Western world he is known for his appearance as Matthew Minami, hosting his own show, with Bill Murray's character Bob Harris in the 2003 movie Lost in Translation. As Matthew, he wears a blonde wig and brightly colored suits while playing a flamboyant and high-energy talk show host.

Although Bill Murray has never been a guest, Fujii (as Matthew Minami) actually hosted such a program, now called Matthew's Best Hit UV, largely consisting of musicians and popular Japanese celebrities, the show's guests are often subject to fierce competition by Matthew Minami himself. The character Matthew Minami also appears in a handful of programs and shorts related to Best Hit TV.

Takashi Fujii is also a popular talent himself and appears frequently on many Japanese variety shows. He is considerably less flamboyant while appearing as himself, but his frequent seemingly random comments and odd gestures are all part of his signature performances. He has even made appearances in the US and China showing off both his comedy and music. Takashi Fujii is currently featured on the following programs (titles are loose translations):

- 発見!仰天!!プレミアもん!!! 土曜はダメよ! (Hakken! Gyōten!! Puremia mon!!! Doyō wa Dame yo!) on YTV
- 新婚さんいらっしゃい！(Shikonsan Irasshai!) on Asahi TV

=== Past appearances ===
- 1999 Heaven's Kiss/Tokyo Ghost Story (天国のkiss, Tengoku no Kiss) (Drama)
- 2001 There's Always Tomorrow (Drama)
- 2001 There's Always Tomorrow (Movie)
- 2001 Beauty 7 (Drama)
- 2002 Manten (Drama)
- 2006 The School of Water Business (Drama)
- 2016 Sanada Maru (Drama) – Sasuke
- 2016 Nigeru wa Haji da ga Yaku ni Tatsu (Drama)
- 2017 Warotenka (Drama)
- 2018 Kamen Rider Build: The Movie – Be the One (Movie) – Mitsuomi Gohara/Zebra Lost Smash
- 2020 Mio's Cookbook (Movie)
- 2021 Will I Be Single Forever? (Movie)
- 2022 My Small Land (Movie)
- 2022 Love Is Blind: Japan (Reality show)
- 2024 Cha-Cha (Movie)
- 2025 Missing Child Videotape (Movie)

Takashi Fujii has also made numerous other minor appearances, as well as contributing his voice talent on various animated movies, including 2004's Mind Game and has been in the Japanese dub versions of 2017's Beauty and the Beast remake and 2021's Thomas & Friends: All Engines Go - Race for the Sodor Cup.

== Music career ==
Fujii is also active as an artist and producer focusing on dance music and J-pop. His single, "Oh My Juliet!", was produced by popular J-pop artist Tommy february^{6}. The song was subsequently featured in the soundtrack to the film Babel.

Along with Tomoko Kawase, he has also worked with well-known artists such as Daisuke Asakura, Tetsuya Komuro, Seiko Matsuda, and Fayray.

In 2004, he did a "World Tour" with concerts in Los Angeles, U.S. and Shanghai, China.

In 2014, he started his own record label: Slenderie Record.

=== Discography ===
==== Singles ====
- SIGN by Pasocom Music Club feat. Takashi Fujii (November 4, 2022)
- Memory Flora with Moe Shop (September 7, 2022)
- We Should be Dancing (Produced by Night Tempo) by KAKKO and TAKASHI (July 8, 2022)
- Headphone Girl-Tsubasa ga Nakutemo (March 9, 2022)
- Dramatic Pink Bikini by sooogood! feat. Takashi Fujii (October 10, 2018)
- Mammottemitai (January 4, 2017)
- Plastic Star (December 14, 2016)
- Dining Tarot under Like a Record round! round! round! (November 26, 2014)
- kappo! under Like a Record round! round! round! (November 26, 2014)
- Now Romantic under Like a Record round! round! round! (September 18, 2014)
- Disco no Kamisama by tofubeats feat. Takashi Fujii (April 30, 2014)
- Selfish Girl by SMALL BOYS feat. Takashi Fujii (December 25, 2013)
- She is my new town/I just want to hold you (June 5, 2013)
- Yabe~ Nabe~na Atsuryoku by THE Possible with Oto no Moto (Takashi Fujii and Oniyakko Tsubaki) (2010)
- Manatsu no Yo no Yume (August 1, 2007)
- Watashi no Aoi Sora (July 7, 2004)
- Mikakunin Hikoutai (February 14, 2002)
- Zetsubō Good Bye (December 12, 2001)
- Ai mo Kawarazu (November 1, 2000)
- Nanda Kanda (March 8, 2000)

EPs

- RE:WIND (July 14, 2017)
- DJ MIX "Delicacy" mixed by DJ DC BRAND'S (July 13, 2016)
- Daisougen no Chiisana Matthew as Matthew Minami (September 13, 2006)
- OH MY JULIET! (October 19, 2005)

==== Albums ====
- Music Restaurant Royal Host (September 9, 2022)
- Light Showers (September 13, 2017)
- Coffee Bar Cowboy (June 17, 2015)
- Shanghai Taiwan II (May 23, 2007)
- Shanghai Taiwan (April 26, 2006)
- All by Myself (July 28, 2004)
- Romeo Michiyuki (February 14, 2002)

As Producer and/or Songwriter

- Makarova (EP) by Terumoto Gōto (May 11, 2022)
- Slenderie Ideal (Album) by Various Artists (October 28, 2020)
- IVKI (EP) by Oniyakko Tsubaki (September 12, 2018)
- Delicacy of Love (EP) by Yu Hayami (August 24, 2016)

Tour DVDs

- Takashi Fujii World Tour Watashi no Aoi Sora 2004 (October 9, 2005)
- Takashi Fujii World Tour 2005 (April 26, 2005)
- Takashi Fujii Romeo no Michiyuki 2002 (December 18, 2002)
  - Re-released in 2020
