= Mai Takahashi =

Japanese actress (born 1984)

Seiko Iwaido
- 岩井堂聖子
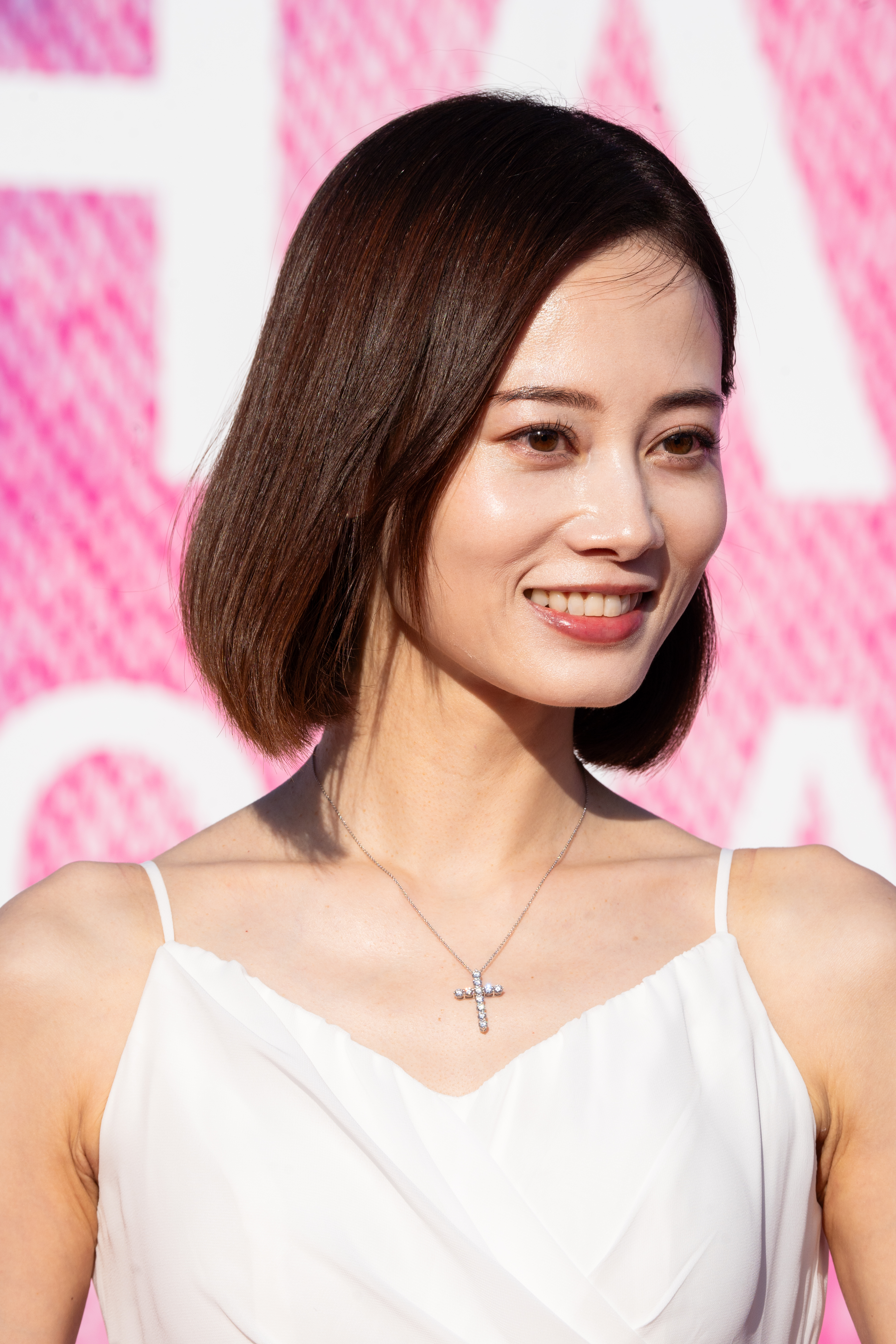
- Iwaido at Yokohama International Film Festival in 2024
- Born: Seiko Iwaido; February 23, 1984 (age 41); Fukuoka, Japan
- Other names: Mai/Mayu Takahashi
- Occupation: Actress
- Years active: 2004–present
- Height: 157 cm (5 ft 2 in)

Seiko Iwaido (岩井堂聖子, Iwaido Seikō; born February 23, 1984) is a Japanese actress, she was formerly known by the stage name Mai Takahashi (高橋 真唯), Iwaido made her acting debut in 2004, playing the role of Amano Sora in TV Asahi's Sky High 2. In 2005, she made her film debut as Fumie Hayashida in Simsons. Since her debut Takahashi has worked with many prominent directors; playing Kawahime, the River Princess, in Takashi Miike's horror-fantasy children's film Yokai Daisenso (released in the U.S. in 2006 as The Great Yokai War.) She also appeared in Sion Sono's 2005 film Kimyo na Sakasu (Strange Circus), Yoshihiro Nakamura's Busu (The Booth, 2005), and in Hitoshi Yazaki's 2006 film Strawberry Shortcakes. In 2008, she appeared in the live action film Pyū to Fuku! Jaguar.

She has also voiced the characters Yuri Kishida, Kanae and Ryuuko Tagawa in the 2006 video game Siren 2, and played 'The girl in red' in the movie adaptation of the game Siren in the same year.

Along with her acting career Mai Takahashi has also appeared in magazines, and has also released two photobooks.

== Selected filmography ==
- 2005: The Great Yokai War
- 2005: Strange Circus
- 2005: The Booth
- 2006: Forbidden Siren
- 2006: Strawberry Shortcakes
- 2009: Fish Story
- 2012: Isn't Anyone Alive?
