= Ashita Ga Arusa (TV series) =

- Genre: Drama
- Starring: Masatoshi Hamada; Izumi Inamori; Takashi Fujii; Kōji Higashino; Shozo Endo; Naoki Tanaka; Hitoshi Matsumoto
- Country of origin: Japan
- Original language: Japanese
- No. of episodes: 11

Original release
- Network: NTV
- Release: April 21 – June 30, 2001

Ashita Ga Arusa (明日があるさ) is a series of television commercials launched by The Coca-Cola Company to promote the Georgia canned coffee in Japan between 2000 and 2003. The campaign focuses on a Salaryman during Lost Decades on the stage of a Trading company. The Ashita Ga Arusa campaign was handled by Beacon Communications, a local advertising agency based in Shinagawa. The campaign was a critical and financial success, that it spawned a Japanese television drama adaptations that aired on NTV in 2001. and a feature film released in 2002

== Cast ==
- Masatoshi Hamada
- Izumi Inamori
- Takashi Fujii
- Kōji Higashino
- Shozo Endo
- Naoki Tanaka
- Hitoshi Matsumoto
