= Minna no Ie =

2001 film by Kōki Mitani

- Film poster
- Directed by: Kōki Mitani
- Written by: Kōki Mitani
- Produced by: Kanjiro Sakura; Yumiko Kuga; Yumiko Shigeoka
- Starring: Naoki Tanaka; Akiko Yagi; Toshiaki Karasawa; Kunie Tanaka
- Cinematography: Kenji Takama
- Edited by: Soichi Ueno
- Music by: Takayuki Hattori
- Release date: June 9, 2001 (Japan)
- Running time: 116 minutes
- Country: Japan
- Language: Japanese

Minna no Ie (Japanese: みんなのいえ), also known as All About Our House, is a 2001 Japanese comedy film written and directed by Kōki Mitani. The film depicts an affluent couple who decide to build a new house, highlighting the clash between traditional Japanese and modern Western architectural styles among the people they hire to construct it.

Cast members include Naoki Tanaka (Iijima Naosuke, the husband), Akiko Yagi (Iijima Tamiko, the wife), Toshiaki Karasawa (Yanagisawa, the interior designer) and Kunie Tanaka (Tamiko's father, the builder). The film also features cameo appearances by the Toho monsters Godzilla and Megaguirus.

The film was nominated for six Japanese Academy Awards. Naoki Tanaka and Akiko Yagi were named as Newcomers of the Year; Tanaka also won the Most Popular Performer prize.

== Plot ==
Naosuke and Tamiko, a happily married couple, have recently purchased land in the countryside to build their new house. They approach Yanagisawa, Tamiko's junior from university and an interior designer, to design the house. However, since he is not a qualified architect, they require someone else to obtain the necessary permits and construct it. They ask Tamiko's father, a builder, to do this.

Yanagisawa is a modernist, influenced by American architecture; Tamako's father is a traditionalist. The two soon clash over the design of the house. After numerous disagreements, they gradually begin to understand each other's perspectives. The house is successfully completed.

== Cast ==
- Naoki Tanaka
- Toshiaki Karasawa
- Akiko Yagi
- Kunie Tanaka
- Nobuo Yana
- Shōbun Inoue
- Tsuyoshi Ihara
- Yoko Nogiwa
- Akira Fuse
- Kiichi Nakai
