= Doraemon: Ken-chan's Adventure =

1981 film by Ryo Motohira

- Kanji: ドラえもん ケンちゃんの冒険
- Revised Hepburn: Doraemon Ken-chan no Bōken
- Directed by: Ryo Motohira
- Screenplay by: Kōichi Mizuide
- Based on: Doraemon by Fujiko Fujio
- Produced by: Ryo Motohira
- Starring: Nobuyo Ōyama; Noriko Ohara; Kaneta Kimotsuki; Kazuya Tatekabe; Michiko Nomura; Keiko Yokozawa; Toshiko Fujita
- Music by: Shunsuke Kikuchi
- Production company: Shin-Ei Animation
- Release dates: July 1981: October 1, 1981 (TV Asahi)
- Running time: 40 minutes
- Country: Japan
- Language: Japanese

Doraemon: Ken-chan's Adventure (ドラえもん ケンちゃんの冒険, Doraemon Ken-chan no Bōken) is a 1981 Japanese animated science fiction comedy-drama short film.

Produced as a part of the International Year of Disabled Persons, it was screened at various schools in Japan and was broadcast on TV Asahi that same year on October 1, 1981.

The special has become a piece of lost media, as it has not been re-broadcast on television nor has ever been released on home video.

== Plot ==
Ken Ikoma, a disabled boy in a wheelchair who loves to collect butterflies, is transferred to the same classroom as Nobita. Due to his disability, Ken has only ever been able to collect bought butterflies at shops and wants to catch a butterfly on his own.

Nobita feels sorry for Ken and with Doraemon's help, they, alongside Nobita's friends, travel back in time to the world over 30,000,000 years ago to allow Ken to catch butterflies on his own.

A giant extinct bird-like dinosaur somehow appears and Ken's wheelchair ends up collapsing, with Ken left struggling to return to his wheelchair on his own. With help from the others, Ken is able to briefly stand up on his own to catch butterflies. Many ancient butterflies appear with Ken being able to catch them, and he thanks Doraemon, Nobita and his friends for the experience.

== Cast ==
Character	Japanese voice actor
Doraemon	Nobuyo Ōyama
Nobita Nobi	Noriko Ohara
Suneo Honekawa	Kaneta Kimotsuki
Takeshi "Gian" Gōda	Kazuya Tatekabe
Shizuka Minamoto	Michiko Nomura
Nobisuke Nobi	Masayuki Katō
Tamako Nobi	Sachiko Chijimatsu
Dorami	Keiko Yokozawa
Ken Ikoma	Toshiko Fujita
Ken's mother	Yukiko Nikaido
Teacher	Kazuhiko Inoue
Boy A	Sanae Takagi
Boy B	Tomiko Suzuki

== Production ==
Ken-chan's Adventure was not released theatrically and was screened at numerous public halls and schools across Japan from the summer to autumn of 1981, was broadcast on TV Asahi on October 5 that same year, and continued to be screened well into the 2000s.

Ken Ikoma became a guide character on the National Welfare Foundation for Children with Disabilities' official website.

Nobuyo Ōyama, the voice actress of Doraemon, stated the film was an unforgettable experience for her because it taught her how to interact with those with disabilities, something she had never known before, and expressed her personal desire for the short film to be re-broadcast on television.

== Release ==
Ken-chan's Adventure was initially only screened across various Japanese schools throughout the year it was produced before it broadcast on the TV Asahi network on October 1, 1981, which featured wraparound segments with Doraemon and Nobita, as well as live-action footage of the special's voice actors Nobuyo Ōyama and Kaneta Kimotsuki visiting a kindergarten school with a Doraemon mascot costume.

== Soundtrack ==
=== Theme songs ===
"Doraemon no Uta" (ドラえもんのうた)
Lyrics: Takumi Kusube / Composition: Shunsuke Kikuchi / Arrangement: Shunsuke Kikuchi / Vocals: Kumiko Ōsugi

"Blue Sky in the Pocket" (青い空はポケットさ)
Lyrics: Hiroo Takada / Composition: Shunsuke Kikuchi / Arrangement: Shunsuke Kikuchi / Vocals: Kumiko Ōsugi
