= Lists of Doraemon episodes =

Doraemon is a Japanese manga with three anime television adaptations. Lists of Doraemon episodes include:

- List of Doraemon (1973 anime series) episodes
- List of Doraemon (1979 TV series) episodes (1979–1986)
- List of Doraemon (2005 anime series) episodes
  - List of Doraemon (2005 TV series) episodes (2005–2014)
  - List of Doraemon (2005 TV series) episodes (2015–2024)
  - List of Doraemon (2005 TV series) episodes (English dub)

== See also ==
- List of Doraemon chapters
