= Doraemon (2005 TV series) =

2005 Japanese anime television series

- Promotional poster
- Also known as: Doraemon: Gadget Cat from the Future
- Genre: Science fiction Comedy
- Based on: Doraemon by Fujiko F. Fujio
- Directed by: Soichiro Zen (2005–2017); Shinnosuke Yakuwa (2017–2018); Hirofumi Ogura (2020–present)
- Voices of: Wasabi Mizuta; Megumi Ōhara; Yumi Kakazu; Subaru Kimura; Tomokazu Seki
- Music by: Kan Sawada
- Country of origin: Japan
- Original language: Japanese
- No. of seasons: 22
- No. of episodes: 915 (1,750+ segments) (list of episodes)

Production
- Editor: Yuki Tsudo
- Running time: 20–26 minutes
- Production companies: TV Asahi; ADK Emotions (Note: Previously credited as Asatsu-DK until 2019.); Shin-Ei Animation

Original release
- Network: ANN (TV Asahi)
- Release: April 15, 2005 – present

Related
- 1979 anime; 1973 anime

Doraemon (ドラえもん) is a Japanese anime television series based on Fujiko F. Fujio's manga of the same name and is the successor to both the 1979 anime and 1973 anime of the same name, serving as the third adaptation in the franchise. The series, produced by Shin-Ei Animation, TV Asahi and ADK Emotions, premiered on TV Asahi and its affiliates in Japan on April 15, 2005, and currently airs in over fifty countries internationally. Since its premiere in 2005, Doraemon has aired 892 episodes, multiple holiday specials and 20 feature films, with a 21st film slated to release in theaters March 2027. This Doraemon anime series is referred to in Asia as the Mizuta Edition (水田版), after Wasabi Mizuta, the voice actress who voices Doraemon in this series.

Over the course of its run, the show has had three English dubs, with a fourth in development. The first one was licensed by Viz Media for North American broadcast exclusively, and developed by Bang Zoom! Entertainment and aired on Disney XD in the United States as Doraemon: Gadget Cat From the Future from July 7, 2014, to September 1, 2015, with reruns lasting up until 2018. The second dub was licensed by LUK Internacional and produced by Red Angel Media in Hong Kong, and began running on Boomerang in the United Kingdom on August 7, 2015, but ended its run not long after in January 2016. The third dub was licensed by Spacetoon India and produced by EarCandy in South Africa, and aired on Disney Channel in India on February 4, 2020, and on Disney Channel HD from August 14, 2023, to May 10, 2025, although episodes of the dub are still occasionally broadcast. The fourth dub is licensed by Cake Entertainment, and was announced in June 2026, scheduled to be released sometime during 2027.

As of 2026, TV Asahi holds the distribution and licensing rights to the series, as well as the previous television adaptation and all the feature-length movies.

== Premise ==
Doraemon is a cat-like robot from the 22nd century future who's sent to the present time (21st century) in Tokyo to steer a 10-year-old elementary boy named Nobita Nobi, an unintelligent, naive and clumsy boy, on the right path in order to secure his future, set him on the right path, and improve his life. Nobita's closest friend and love interest is the kind, sweet, and caring Shizuka Minamoto, while his frenemies who bully and tease him are rich kid Suneo Honekawa and neighborhood bully Takeshi Gōda, also known as "Gian".

== Cast and characters ==
Doraemon, Nobita Nobi, Shizuka Minamoto, Suneo Honekawa, and Takeshi "Gian" Gōda as seen in the 2005 series, with the July 2017 animation update and onwards.

Character	Voice actor				Ref(s)
Character	Japanese	English			Ref(s)
Character	Japanese	US (Bang Zoom!/Viz Media)	UK/Hong Kong (Red Angel Media)	India/South Africa (EarCandy)	Ref(s)
Doraemon	Wasabi Mizuta	Mona Marshall	Sarah Hauser	Damon Berry	
Nobisuke Nobi (Toby Nobi)	Yasunori Matsumoto	Tony Oliver	Russell Wait	Damon Berry	
Hidetoshi Dekisugi (Ace Goody)	Shihoko Hagino	Spike Spencer	—N/a	Damon Berry	
Yoshio Minamoto (Mr. Minamoto)	Aruno Tahara Tōru Ōkawa	Steve Blum Travis Willingham	—N/a	Damon Berry	
Mr. Kaminari (Mr. Rumbleton)	Katsuhisa Hōki	Todd Haberkorn	—N/a	Damon Berry	
Sunekichi Honekawa	Takumi Yamazaki	Derek Stephen Prince	—N/a	Damon Berry	
Teacher (Mr. S)	Wataru Takagi	Keith Silverstein	—N/a	Damon Berry	
Nobirō Nobi (Chester Nobi)	Kōichi Hashimoto	Keith Silverstein	—N/a	Damon Berry	
Nobita Nobi (Noby Nobi)	Megumi Ōhara	Johnny Yong Bosch	Muriel Hofmann	Christine van Hees	
Mrs. Gōda	Miyako Takeuchi	Jessica Gee-George	Muriel Hofmann	Tulla Eckhart	
Takeshi "Gian" Gōda ("Big G" Gōda)	Subaru Kimura	Kaiji Tang	Dave Bridges	Christine van Hees	
Mrs. Honekawa	Minami Takayama	Dorothy Elias-Fahn	—N/a	Christine van Hees	
Jaiko Gōda (Little G)	Vanilla Yamazaki	Minae Noji	Muriel Hofmann	Christine van Hees	
Tsubasa Ito (Sera Ivy)	Masayo Kurata	Mela Lee	—N/a	Christine van Hees	
Shizuka Minamoto (Sue Minamoto)	Yumi Kakazu	Cassandra Lee Morris	Catherine Fu	Christine van Hees	
Tamako Nobi (Tammy Nobi)	Kotono Mitsuishi	Mari Devon	Catherine Fu	Tulla Eckhart	
Suneo Honekawa (Sneech)	Tomokazu Seki	Brian Beacock	Ben Margalith	Tulla Eckhart	
Dorami	Chiaki	Wendee Lee	—N/a	Christine van Hees	
Michiko Minamoto	Ai Orikasa	Wendee Lee	—N/a	Tulla Eckhart	
Sewashi Nobi (Soby Nobi)	Sachi Matsumoto	Max Mittelman	—N/a	—N/a	
Mr. Honekawa	Hideyuki Tanaka	Joe J. Thomas	—N/a	Damon Berry	
Mini-Dora (Mini Doraemon)	Tomato Akai (2005–2009); Hisako Kanemoto (2017–present)	Cristina Valenzuela	—N/a	—N/a	
Mii-chan (Mimi)	Mari Maruta	Stephanie Sheh	—N/a	—N/a	
Mr. Gōda	Shinpachi Tsuji	Kirk Thornton	—N/a	Damon Berry	

== Production and broadcasting ==
Beginning in 2004, to commemorate the 25th anniversary of the then-ongoing 1979 anime and the release of Doraemon: Nobita in the Wan-Nyan Spacetime Odyssey, a significant revival of the Doraemon series began development, which would become the third series produced in the franchise. A trailer for the new Doraemon series was previewed for the first time on March 25, 2005, at the end of the first television broadcast of Doraemon: Nobita in the Wan-Nyan Spacetime Odyssey. A week after the 1979 anime finale broadcast on March 18, the television broadcast of the film contained goodbye messages from the 1979 anime voice actors Nobuyo Ōyama, Noriko Ohara, Kazuya Tatekabe, Michiko Nomura and Kaneta Kimotsuki, respectively. The anime officially premiered as a one-hour special on April 15 of that same year, less than a month after the 1979 anime had ended.

With the shift, the majority of the personnel from the 1979 anime stepped down, and were replaced by a new team for the new series, as well as the original voice actors. Sōichirō Zen, who had previously worked on the 1979 anime, served as the director of the 2005 anime for more than 12 years, from 2005 to 2017. Ayumu Watanabe had previously worked on the 1979 anime, beginning in the late 1980s, and after the transition, he was tasked with developing character designs for the series, where he worked for eight years.

The new series features updated versions of the characters, different settings, and a new soundtrack. Although the anime is more faithful to the original manga and volumes, some changes were made. Many of the episodes that adapted chapters from the manga were extended to either have a better conclusion or a good moral to the story. In addition, some elements from the manga were toned down. Some examples include all of Doraemon's gadgets that resembled medicine being changed to different appliances, and Nobita's dad (who smoked often in the manga) rarely smoking in the new series. All mini corners, partners, and next episodes previews in all episodes are cut to fit for the 30-minute block in international versions, except for Hong Kong, which are cut to fit for the 15-minute block in its time-slot. Since May 1, 2009, the series airs in high definition. The episodes are recorded at APU Meguro Studio.

First revealed in June 2017, starting on July 28, 2017, with the episodes "I'm Mini Doraemon" and "The Elephant and the Uncle", the show got overhauled visually to use more vivid colors, which included the poster artwork. The characters were altered to closely resemble their original designs. Shinnosuke Yakuwa, who directed several of the Doraemon films, joined the production team as head director for the anime in 2018, and was succeeded by Hirofumi Ogura in 2020. By 2023, the series' production staff had been divided into two groups.

Originally, the show aired on Fridays at 7:00 pm from its premiere to September 29, 2017, the same network timeslot that the 1979 anime aired on from 1981 up until its conclusion in 2004. As of October 5, 2019, the anime now airs Saturday afternoons at 5:00 pm on TV Asahi and other ANN stations.

The series has paid respect to past cast members, such as Nobuyo Ōyama, the voice for Doraemon for the 1979 series who died on September 29, 2024. The episode "Emperor's New Clothes!? Ultra Yoroi" was scheduled to be rebroadcast, but it was replaced with a montage of clips from the 1979 anime honoring Ōyama's contributions to the series and a rerun of the episode "Wolfman Cream".

=== Casting ===
On November 22, 2004, The Asahi Shimbun revealed in an exclusive article that the series' five voice actors were considered by the production team to be replaced by a group of newer, younger voice actors, with their roles slated to begin in April of the following year, which was met with confusion and great public interest as the news of such a big change was very abrupt; many employees from TV Asahi learned about the news from the article, while the staff that worked on the anime were previously briefed.

One of the reasons for the new casting was because Nobuyo Ōyama, the original voice actress for Doraemon in the 1979 anime, wanted to step down since 2001 due to health issues she faced in July of that year. Furthermore, Michiko Nomura, who voiced Shizuka in the 1979 anime, decided to step down from the longest-running series Sazae-san to focus on her management position duties at her husband's Ken Production studio and left alongside the original cast. It was also due to the fact that most of the original cast members by that time were in their mid 60s. The voice actors to the five main characters, Doraemon, Nobita, Shizuka, Gian, and Suneo, were chosen from a pool of 590 applicants. Auditions for the series were held to select a voice that would best fit the original anime's atmosphere, starting in December 2004. TV Asahi stated in March 2005 that they chose voice actors who sounded similar to the predecessors, so that there wouldn't be a significant change from the original voice actors to the new voice actors. The new voice actors for the new series were officially announced on March 13, 2005, and were also revealed on March 28 of that year during a news conference in Roppongi Hills.

Subaru Kimura, the voice of Gian in the anime, was the youngest member of the new cast that was confirmed, as he was 14 years old at the time. Subaru was formerly a member of a children's theater group, but he had no experience as a voice actor, and one of the reasons he auditioned for the job was just to gain popularity in class. Subaru was initially terrified at the auditions, but he finally landed the role of Gian. Wasabi Mizuta was chosen to play the title character and was approached by Kazuya Tatekabe, who had previously voiced Gian in the 1979 anime, to audition for the series. Mizuta was initially concerned about being fired, due to the negative criticisms about the sudden change in voice actors, but after Doraemon: Nobita's Dinosaur 2006 released, she continued with the role. Yumi Kakazu acquired the part of Shizuka, after previously having auditioned for the roles of Doraemon, Suneo, Nobita and Gian.

=== English dubs ===
There are three notable English dubs that were produced: Bang Zoom's American English dub, Red Angel Media's British/Hong Kong English dub (which aired on Boomerang), and EarCandy's South African English dub (which aired on Disney Channel). An upcoming fourth dub by Cake Entertainment is currently in the works.

In the United States, Doraemon: Gadget Cat from the Future was first announced in May 2014. Produced by Fujiko Pro, TV Asahi and Bang Zoom! Entertainment, Gadget Cat from the Future aired on Disney XD from July 7, 2014, to September 1, 2015, for a total of two seasons and 52 episodes. The dub features veteran anime voice actress Mona Marshall in the title role of Doraemon and Johnny Yong Bosch as Nobita, who is known in the English dub as "Noby". In Canada, Gadget Cat from the Future briefly aired on Disney XD's Canadian feed, before being re-branded as Family CHRGD. In Australia, the series started airing on 26 January 2015 on Network Ten, before moving to Boomerang. It was announced that reruns of the American version would be re-imported to Japan and aired on Disney Channel Japan starting on February 1, 2016. The network also provides a Japanese dub of the version as a secondary audio feed.

The English dub has been heavily modified to meet American broadcasting guidelines, censoring content deemed inappropriate for American children, as well as replacing many Japanese cultural elements with American cultural elements. Some modifications include Americanized character and gadget name changes from the English version of the manga, an episode order completely different from the Japanese episode order, nudity being heavily censored by adding steam, cloud effects, or clothing, and some episodes having several minutes of footage cut.

However, certain uniquely Japanese characteristics – such as house structure, kneeling on the floor to eat, the side where cars drive, and Nobisuke Nobi (Toby Nobi)'s kimono – remain. Japanese food featured throughout the series were also localized: while Doraemon's favorite food, dorayaki, was kept in but referred as "yummy buns", others were edited out and replaced with Western equivalents, such as omurice becoming pancakes. All the background music and sound effects were replaced with new background music and sound effects deemed "easier for American children to empathize". At least one character's personality was also partially rewritten. Shizuka, renamed Sue in the English dub. is portrayed as more tomboyish and athletic than the Japanese version, although her sweet nature and kind personality were not changed. This is reportedly because her traditionally Japanese habits were perceived as being difficult for American children to understand in test viewings of the Japanese version.

In the United Kingdom, Gadget Cat from the Future was first announced by LUK International in mid-July 2015 and began broadcasting on August 17, 2015, on Boomerang. However, it finished its run sometime in January 2016 and has never been broadcast since, due to it being considered a failure in the British market and was removed from the Boomerang lineup in early 2016. This dub is believed to have covered 26 episodes, with some of these episodes having not been found. Unlike the previous English dub from the United States, this dub is more accurate to the original scripts from the Japanese version of the series, as well as the opening and episode orders. Two notable differences are that in this dub, the original title cards are retained, albeit with English localization, unlike the American dub, which superimposed the text over the episode and removed the Japanese title card. However, unlike the American dub, Japanese text in the episodes (e.g. signs) in the UK dub are unlocalized, with no subtitles or voiceover whatsoever translating them. Despite this dub being made for and to be broadcast in the United Kingdom only, it was produced in Hong Kong, where the dub was recorded at Red Angel Media. The names of the main characters are borrowed from the English dub from the United States.

In India, Doraemon was aired in English on Disney Channel in early 2020, and later on Disney Channel HD from August 14, 2023, to May 10, 2025. This dub was produced by EarCandy in South Africa and licensed by Spacetoon India, and covers seasons 15 and 16. Like LUK International's dub, this dub is more accurate to the Japanese version of the series, although some dialogue, such as references to beef or alcohol products, is muted to meet Indian broadcasting standards. Unlike the other two dubs, this dub consists of a very limited cast of only three actors who play the roles of every character.

In 2026, UK-based Cake Entertainment announced an international distribution partnership with TV Asahi alongside producing an all-new English dub to help expand the franchise to a new audience. It will consist of 52 episodes, each with a duration of 11 minutes, and is scheduled to be released sometime during 2027.

== Episodes ==
Year	Episodes	Originally released	
Year	Episodes	First released	Last released
2005	32	April 15, 2005	December 31, 2005
2006	42	January 13, 2006	December 31, 2006
2007	36	January 12, 2007	December 31, 2007
2008	44	January 11, 2008	December 31, 2008
2009	42	January 9, 2009	December 31, 2009
2010	38	January 8, 2010	December 17, 2010
2011	43	January 3, 2011	December 16, 2011
2012	40	January 6, 2012	December 31, 2012
2013	35	January 11, 2013	December 30, 2013
2014	35	January 17, 2014	December 30, 2014
2015	39	January 9, 2015	December 31, 2015
2016	41	January 15, 2016	December 31, 2016
2017	38	January 13, 2017	December 31, 2017
2018	42	January 7, 2018	December 31, 2018
2019	37	January 18, 2019	December 28, 2019
2020	52	January 11, 2020	December 31, 2020
2021	51	January 9, 2021	December 31, 2021
2022	52	January 8, 2022	December 31, 2022
2023	48	January 7, 2023	December 31, 2023
2024	47	January 6, 2024	December 28, 2024
2025	49	January 11, 2025	December 27, 2025
2026	TBA	January 10, 2026	TBA

=== Mini corners and specials ===
In this Doraemon series, since 2005, there are two "mini corners" that were broadcast during the series' runtime: Doraemon Mini Theater from April to July 2005 and Dora Dora Mini Theater from October to December 2022. Like the 1979 anime, the series has both holiday and birthday specials.

== Theme songs ==
=== Opening themes ===
In Japanese, the series features a total of eight opening themes, with the first song being "Doraemon no Uta," which originally served as the opening theme for the whole 1979 anime. Beginning in October 2005, "Doraemon no Uta" was replaced for the first time by "Hagushichao". Most of the international versions of the series only use the third opening theme and their own endings.

As of November 2024, the current opening theme is "Yume wo Kanaete Doraemon", which is sung and performed by Mao. The song was previously used from 2007 to 2019. The last broadcast of the previous theme song, "Doraemon", was aired on November 2. The American dub uses its own unique opening sequence that compiles footage from the Japanese version. To explain the premise of the story, a narration by Doraemon about "why he came from the future" is used rather than an actual opening theme. The ending theme is an instrumental played over scenes from the second variation of the third Japanese opening theme.

	Performer	Song title	Starting date	Ending date
1.	12 Girls Band	"Doraemon no Uta" (ドラえもんのうた)	April 15, 2005	October 21, 2005
2.	Rimi Natsukawa	"Hagushichao" (ハグしちゃお)	October 28, 2005	April 20, 2007
3.	Mao	"Yume wo Kanaete Doraemon" (夢をかなえてドラえもん)	May 11, 2007	September 6, 2019
4.	Motohiro Hata	"Sunflower Promise" (「ひまわりの約束」)	August 1, 2014	August 29, 2014
5.	Doraemon cast	"Make My Dreams Come True – Character Song Version" (「Make My Dreams Come True ～キャラクターソングバージョン～」)	October 17, 2014	November 28, 2014
6.	Doraemon cast	"Doraemon no Uta 40th" (ドラえもんのうた 40th)	April 5, 2019	April 19, 2019
7.	Gen Hoshino	"Doraemon"	October 5, 2019	November 2, 2024
8.	Mao	"Yume wo Kanaete Doraemon" (夢をかなえてドラえもん)	November 9, 2024	present

=== Ending themes ===
Since the series incorporates all the credits into the opening theme, an ending theme is primarily absent. However, some episodes use an ending theme.

	Song title	Performer	Starting date	Ending date
1.	"Doraemon Ekaki-uta" (ドラえもん・えかきうた/ドラえもん絵描き歌)	Wasabi Mizuta (水田わさび)	April 23, 2005	September 17, 2005
2.	"Odore Dore Dora Doraemon Ondo 2007" (踊れ・どれ・ドラ ドラえもん音頭2007)	Wasabi Mizuta (水田わさび)	June 29, 2007	August 10, 2007
3.	"Dorami-chan Ekaki-uta" (ドラミちゃんのえかきうた)	Chiaki (千秋)	TBA	TBA
4.	"Moshimonogatari" (もしものがたり)	Tani Yuuki (たにゆうき)	October 4, 2025	present

== DVD releases ==
Shogakukan (Japan, Region 2 DVD)
Part	Volume	Episode	Release date	Ref.
1	Volume 1	1—2	February 10, 2006	
1	Volume 2	3—5	February 10, 2006	
1	Volume 3	6—8	February 10, 2006	
1	Volume 4	9—11	March 17, 2006	
1	Volume 5	12—13	March 17, 2006	
1	Volume 6	14–16	March 17, 2006	
1	Volume 7	17–19	October 13, 2006	
1	Volume 8	20–22	October 13, 2006	
1	Volume 9	24A, 23, 25	October 13, 2006	
1	Volume 10	24B, 26–27	November 10, 2006	
1	Volume 11	28–30	February 9, 2007	
1	Volume 12	31, 33–34	February 9, 2007	
1	Volume 13	35—37	February 9, 2007	
2	Volume 14	38–39	March 2, 2007	
2	Volume 15	40, 42, 43A, 41	March 2, 2007	
2	Volume 16	43B—43C, 45, 46A	March 2, 2007	
2	Volume 17	53, 55A, 56B, 57B, 58A	October 12, 2007	
2	Volume 18	59, 60B, 61A, 63A	October 12, 2007	
2	Volume 19	65, 66B, 67–68	October 12, 2007	
2	Volume 20	70B, 69A, 70A, 71, 73A	November 9, 2007	
2	Volume 21	72B, 73B, 75A, 76B, 77B	February 15, 2008	
2	Volume 22	75B—76A, 77A, 78, 79A	February 15, 2008	
2	Volume 23	82B, 79B, 82A, 84	February 15, 2008	
3	Volume 24	87, 83, 86	April 11, 2008	
3	Volume 25	89A, 88B, 89B, 90, 91A	April 11, 2008	
3	Volume 26	91B, 92, 93, 95A	April 11, 2008	
3	Volume 27	95B, 97, 98B, 99	October 10, 2008	
3	Volume 28	100A, 98A, 103, 104	October 10, 2008	
3	Volume 29	105, 106, 107B	November 7, 2008	
3	Volume 30	108B, 32B, 32A, 72A	February 10, 2009	
4	Volume 31	111–113	March 6, 2009	
4	Volume 32	114, 117–118	March 6, 2009	
4	Volume 33	123, 127, 129	March 6, 2009	
4	Volume 34	124, 130, 131A, 122B,	April 10, 2009	
4	Volume 35	128, 133, 134	April 10, 2009	
4	Volume 36	135–137	April 10, 2009	
4	Volume 37	138–139, 140A, 142B	October 2, 2009	
4	Volume 38	142A, 143–144, 148	October 2, 2009	
4	Volume 39	146, 149–150	November 6, 2009	
4	Volume 40	151–153	November 6, 2009	
4	Volume 41	155–157	February 19, 2010	
4	Volume 42	161, 159, 163	February 19, 2010	
4	Volume 43	169–171	February 19, 2010	
5	Volume 44	172–173, 175	April 9, 2010	
5	Volume 45	176—178	April 9, 2010	
5	Volume 46	180—181, 183	April 9, 2010	
6	Volume 47	184, 186–187	November 12, 2010	
6	Volume 48	188–190	November 12, 2010	
6	Volume 49	191–193	December 10, 2010	
6	Volume 50	194, 196A, 168	December 10, 2010	
6	Volume 51	197–199	March 4, 2011	
6	Volume 52	200–202	March 4, 2011	
6	Volume 53	204, 207–208	March 4, 2011	
6	Volume 54	209–210, 212	April 8, 2011	
6	Volume 55	213–214, 217A, 216B	April 8, 2011	
6	Volume 56	217B, 218–219, 221A	April 8, 2011	
7	Volume 57	221B, 222–223, 225A	September 9, 2011	
7	Volume 58	225B, 226–227, 230A	September 9, 2011	
7	Volume 59	231, 230B, 232A, 233	November 10, 2011	
7	Volume 60	236–238, 232B	November 10, 2011	
7	Volume 61	239, 240A,242A, 241	February 17, 2012	
7	Volume 62	242B, 246, 247B, 248A, 247A	February 17, 2012	
7	Volume 63	249, 250, 251A, 248B	February 17, 2012	
7	Volume 64	251B, 255A, 260B, 253	March 9, 2012	
7	Volume 65	254, 259, 261A, 258A	March 9, 2012	
7	Volume 66	257, 261B, 262, 260A	March 9, 2012	
8	Volume 67	267B, 263A, 264, 267A, 263B	October 12, 2012	
8	Volume 68	269A, 268, 269B, 270	October 12, 2012	
8	Volume 69	271A, 272A, 273A, 271B, 273B	November 9, 2012	
8	Volume 70	274A, 275, 274B, 276	November 9, 2012	
9	Volume 71	280A, 282A, 284A, 279B, 278B, 283B	February 8, 2013	
9	Volume 72	278A, 281A, 287A, 284B, 280B,281B	February 8, 2013	
9	Volume 73	279A, 287B, 289B, 293A, 292A, 285B	February 8, 2013	
9	Volume 74	289A, 290, 292B, 293B, 283A	March 8, 2013	
9	Volume 75	295A, 297B, 298A, 294B, 296A,282B	March 8, 2013	
9	Volume 76	296B, 299A, 298B, 295B, 291	March 8, 2013	
9	Volume 77	302A, 303B, 304B, 305A, 306A, 300A	October 11, 2013	
9	Volume 78	301A, 302B, 305B, 304A, 308B, 311B	October 11, 2013	
9	Volume 79	301B, 309B, 310A, 312B, 315B, 317D	November 8, 2013	
9	Volume 80	313A, 315A, 314A, 317B, 317C, 308A	November 8, 2013	
10	Volume 81	318A, 319–320,321A	February 7, 2014	
10	Volume 82	321B, 322B, 323, 326	February 7, 2014	
10	Volume 83	327–329	February 7, 2014	
10	Volume 84	330–332	March 5, 2014	
10	Volume 85	333–335	March 5, 2014	
10	Volume 86	336–337, 338C, 338A	March 5, 2014	
10	Volume 87	339–341	October 2, 2014	
10	Volume 88	342–343, 345	October 2, 2014	
10	Volume 89	346–348	November 5, 2014	
10	Volume 90	349, 351, 352A, 352B	November 5, 2014	
11	Volume 91	353–355	February 4, 2015	
11	Volume 92	357, 359–360	February 4, 2015	
11	Volume 93	350C, 352C, 32C, 362A	February 4, 2015	
11	Volume 94	361, 363–364	March 4, 2015	
11	Volume 95	365, 367–368	March 4, 2015	
11	Volume 96	366B, 369–370,371A	October 7, 2015	
11	Volume 97	371B, 372B, 372C, 374, 375B	October 7, 2015	
11	Volume 98	366A, 373B, 375A, 385A	October 7, 2015	
11	Volume 99	376–378, 379A	November 12, 2015	
11	Volume 100	379B, 380–381, 382A	November 12, 2015	
11	Volume 101	382B, 383–384, 385B, 386A	February 10, 2016	
11	Volume 102	387A, 387C,388, 389B, 391B, 392A	February 10, 2016	
11	Volume 103	392B, 393B, 395B, 396–397	February 10, 2016	
11	Volume 104	398–400, 401B, 402A	March 9, 2016	
11	Volume 105	402B, 402C, 403–404, 405A, 405B	March 9, 2016	
11	Volume 106	338B, 387B, 401A, 410C	March 9, 2016	
12	Volume 107	405B, 406–408	October 5, 2016	
12	Volume 108	409, 410A, 411–412	October 5, 2016	
12	Volume 109	413, 415B, 416, 417A	November 9, 2016	
12	Volume 110	417B, 418–420	November 9, 2016	
12	Volume 111	421–423, 424B	February 15, 2017	
12	Volume 112	424A, 425A, 426B, 426A, 428B, 430	February 15, 2017	
12	Volume 113	431B, 432A, 433, 436B, 437	February 15, 2017	
12	Volume 114	438–439, 440B, 441	March 8, 2017	
12	Volume 115	442–444, 445A	March 8, 2017	
12	Volume 116	414, 436A, 439	March 8, 2017	
13	Volume 117		October 4, 2017	
13	Volume 118		October 4, 2017	
13	Volume 119		November 8, 2017	
13	Volume 120		November 8, 2017	
13	Volume 121	461A, 463–464, 465B, 466A,	February 7, 2018	
13	Volume 122	468, 469B, 470A, 471, 472A	February 7, 2018	
13	Volume 123	455, 461B, 467A	February 7, 2018	
13	Volume 124	472B, 473–474, 477A, 477B	March 7, 2018	
13	Volume 125	477C, 478–479, 480B, 481A	March 7, 2018	
