= List of Doraemon soundtrack albums =

This is a list of the various Doraemon soundtrack albums in the Doraemon series that have been released in Japan over the years.

== Overall ==
	Album title	Release date	Label
1	Doraemon Eiga Shudaika-shuu	March 1, 1995	Polydor
2	Doraemon 20th Anniversary - Dora The Best	September 23, 1999	Columbia Music Entertainment
3	Doraemon Song Soundtrack History	September 1, 2001	Columbia Music Entertainment
4	Boku Doraemon ~Doraemon Song Collection~	June 28, 2004	Columbia Music Entertainment
5	Dora the Movie 25th -Doraemon Movie Song Collection	September 22, 2004	Columbia Music Entertainment
6	Doraemon Animation Soundtrack	July 19, 2006	Columbia Music Entertainment
7	Doraemon BGM Collection Anime Music soundtrack	November 22, 2006	Columbia Music Entertainment
8	Doraemon To Nakamatachi Song Collection	August 22, 2007	Columbia Music Entertainment
9	Doraemon uta no dai kōshin	January 23, 2008	Columbia Music Entertainment
10	Doraemon Eigo no Uta	October 1, 2008	Columbia Music Entertainment
11	Doraemon TV Soundtrack Collection	November 25, 2009	Columbia Music Entertainment
12	Doraemon Soundtrack History 2	April 21, 2010	Columbia Music Entertainment
13	Doraemon Twin Best	June 22, 2011	Nippon Columbia
14	Stand by Me Doraemon Original Soundtrack	September 17, 2014	Nippon Columbia
15	Doraemon Main Theme Song Collection	April 1, 2015	Nippon Columbia

== List ==
=== Doraemon Eiga Shudaika-shuu ===
No.	Title	Length
1.	"Sayonara ni sayonara" (Kaientai)
2.	"Yume no hito" (Takeda Tetsuya, Ichiza)
3.	"Shōnen-ki" (Takeda Tetsuya)
4.	"Tenmadetodoke" (dō)
5.	"Kumo ga yuku no wa" (dō)
6.	"Ji no tabibito" (dō)
7.	"Sekai wa gū choki pā" (Takeda Tetsuya, Ichiza)
8.	"Sayonara ni sayonara" (original karaoke)
9.	"Yume no hito" (dō)
10.	"Shōnen-ki" (dō)
11.	"Tenmadetodoke" (dō)
12.	"Kumo ga yuku no wa" (dō)
13.	"Ji no tabibito" (dō)
14.	"Sekai wa gū choki pā" (dō)

=== Doraemon 20th Anniversary - Dora The Best ===
No.	Title	Length
1.	"Doraemon no Uta"
2.	"Poketto no naka ni"
3.	"Kokoro wo Yurashite"
4.	"Dakara minna de"
5.	"Umi wa boku-ra to"
6.	"Kaze no Magical" (Instrumental)
7.	"Shounenki"
8.	"Watashi ga fushigi"
9.	"Tomodachi Dakara"
10.	"Kimi ga Irukara"
11.	"Toki no tabibito"
12.	"Tenmade Todoke"
13.	"Yume no Yukue"
14.	"Kumo ga yuku no wa"
15.	"Nani ka ī koto kitto aru"
16.	"Yume no Nin"
17.	"Sekai wa gū choki pā"
18.	"Sayonara ni Sayonara"
19.	"Watashi no Naka no Ginga"
20.	"Love is you"
21.	"Hot Milk"
22.	"Doraemon'nouta"
23.	"Aoi Sora Poketto"
24.	"Boku-tachi chikyūjin"
25.	"Aozoratteīna"
26.	"Doraemon Ekaki Uta"
27.	"Maru kao no uta"
28.	"Doraemon ondo"
29.	"Boku Doraemon"
30.	"Doraemon komori uta"
31.	"Nonkina Nobitakun"
32.	"Shizukachan no Uta"
33.	"Ore wa Jaian samada!"
34.	"Suneo no Uta"
35.	"Harō! Dorami-chan"
36.	"Doraemon no Uta"

=== Doraemon Song Soundtrack History ===
No.	Title	Length
1.	"Doraemon no Uta" (TV size)
2.	"Mirai no kuni kara harubaru to"
3.	"Doraemo ~n!"
4.	"Himitsudōgu tōjō! !"
5.	"Doraemon ondo" (TV size, Oyama Nobuyo)
6.	"Aoisoraha poketto-sa" (TV size)
7.	"Doraemon'nōta" (instrumental)
8.	"Urara ka na hirusagari ~ suriru! Sasupensu! !"
9.	"Sutekina dōgu de suisui to"
10.	"Nobita no dai shippai"
11.	"Ending ~ tanoshimi ni mattete ne!"
12.	"Maru kao no uta" (TV size, Oyama Nobuyo)
13.	"Boku-tachi chikyūjin" (TV size, Horie Mitsuko)
14.	"Aozoratteīna" (TV size, Horie Mitsuko)
15.	"Aoisoraha poketto-sa" (1 Coras instrumental)
16.	"Doraemon'nōta" (TV size, Yamano Satoko)
17.	"“Doraemon” sutereo-ban ongaku medorē part 1"
18.	"Bokudoraemon" (instrumental)
19.	"“Doraemon” sutereo-ban ongaku medorē part 2"
20.	"Bokudoraemon 2112" (TV size, Oyama Nobuyo)
21.	"Kaettekitadoraemon" (kumikyoku)
22.	"Nobitanokekkonzen'ya The Night Before A Wedding"
23.	"Obāchan'noomoide" (kumikyoku)
24.	"Aoisoraha poketto sa" (Yamano Satoko)
25.	"Bokudoraemon" (TV size, Oyama Nobuyo)
26.	"Nobitanouchūkaitakushi" (kumikyoku)
27.	"Kokoro o yurashite" (eiga size, Iwabuchi Makoto)
28.	"Nobita no dai makyō" (kumikyoku)
29.	"Dakara min'nade" (eiga size, Iwabuchi Makoto)
30.	"Nobita no kaiteikiganjō" (kumikyoku)
31.	"Umi wa boku-ra to" (eiga size, Iwabuchi Makoto)
32.	"Nobita no makaidaibōken" (kumikyoku)
33.	"Nobita no shōuchū sensō" (kumikyoku)
34.	"Nobita to tetsujin heidan" (kumikyoku)
35.	"Watashi ga fushigi" (eiga size)
36.	"Nobita to ryū no kishi" (kumikyoku)
37.	"Nobita no parareru Saiyūki" (kumikyoku)
38.	"Nobita no nihontanjō" (kumikyoku)
39.	"Nobita to animaru wakusei" (kumikyoku)
40.	"Nobita no dorabian'naito" (kumikyoku)
41.	"Nobita to kumo no ōkoku" (kumikyoku)
42.	"Nobita to buriki no meikyū" (kumikyoku)
43.	"Nobita to mugensankenshi" (kumikyoku)
44.	"Nobita no sōsei nikki" (kumikyoku)
45.	"Nobita to ginga chō tokkyū (kumikyoku)"
46.	"Nobita no neji maki toshi bōken-ki" (kumikyoku)
47.	"Poketto no naka ni" (eiga size, Oyama Nobuyo)

=== Boku Doraemon ~Doraemon Song Collection~ ===
Đĩa 1
No.	Title	Length
1.	"Doraemon no Uta" (Osugi Kumiko)
2.	"Aoisoraha poketto sa" (Osugi Kumiko)
3.	"Doraemon e kaki uta" (Oyama Nobuyo)
4.	"Doraemon ondo" (Oyama Nobuyo)
5.	"Boku Doraemon" (Oyama Nobuyo)
6.	"Wanpaku san'ningumi" (Ohara Noriko - Kimotsuki Kaneta - Tatekabe Kazuya)
7.	"Doradora doko ka ni Doraemon" (Osugi Kumiko)
8.	"Doraemon no yume" (Osugi Kumiko)
9.	"Doraemon māchi" (Kōrogi' 73)
10.	"Doraemon kazoeuta" (Oyama Nobuyo)

Đĩa 2
No.	Title	Length
1.	"Ore ha Jaiansamada!" (Tatekabe Kazuya)
2.	"Nonkina Nobitakun" (Ohara Noriko)
3.	"Shizukachan no uta" (Kaori Kumiko)
4.	"Suneotto no uta" (Kimotsuki Kaneta)
5.	"Pokapoka fuwafuwa" (Osugi Kumiko)
6.	"Maru kao no uta" (Oyama Nobuyo)
7.	"Santakurōsu wa doko no hito" (Oyama Nobuyo)
8.	"Doraemon no kurisumasu" (Oyama Nobuyo)
9.	"Boku-tachi chikyūjin" (Horie Mitsuko)
10.	"Rōkyoku Doraemon" (Oyama Nobuyo)

=== Dora the Movie 25th - Doraemon Movie Song Collection ===
No.	Title	Length
1.	"Pocket no Naka ni" (Oyama Nobuyo)
2.	"Kokoro wo Yurashi te" (Iwabuchi Makoto)
3.	"Dakara Minna de" (Iwabuchi Makoto)
4.	"Umi ha Boku ra To" (Iwabuchi Makoto)
5.	"Shounen ki" (Takeda Tetsuya)
6.	"Watashi ga Fushigi" (Osugi Kumiko)
7.	"Tomodachi da Kara" (Oyama Nobuyo)
8.	"Kimi ga Iru Kara" (Horie Mitsuko)
9.	"Ten made Todoke" (Takeda Tetsuya)
10.	"Nani ka Ii koto Kitto Aru" (Shimazaki Wakano)
11.	"Tomodachinanoni" (Kuko)
12.	"Itoshino nyāo" (Yokoyama Chisa)
13.	"Hottomiruku" (Yoshikawa Hinano)
14.	"Shiawase no Doa" (Nakanishi Yasushi)
15.	"Doraemon no Uta" (Vienna Boys Choir)
16.	"Kono Hoshi no Doko ka de" (Yuki Saori)
17.	"Hagushiyō" (Takekawa Kukihide& T' s Company)
18.	"Sayonara to wa Twanaide" (Da Kāpo)
19.	"Kimi ni Aitakute/" (Kosaka Akiko)
20.	"Isshoniarukō ~ Walking into sunshine ～" (Konishiki)

=== Doraemon Animation Soundtrack ===
No.	Title	Length
1.	"Yume o kika sete"
2.	"Oto nari no purin se su"
3.	"Suneotto no o botcha manbo"
4.	"Sokonoke! Jaian-sa mada"
5.	"Doraemo n nanafushigi ~sono ni ~"
6.	"Kimi no naka no Nobita"

=== Doraemon BGM Collection Anime Music soundtrack ===
No.	Title	Length
1.	"Opening yume o ki kasete" (1 kōrasu)
2.	"Dora e mon no tē ma" (M - 43 M - 50 M - 54)
3.	"Susume! Doraemon māchi" (insuto)
4.	"Sokono ke! Jaian sa mada" (1 kōrasu)
5.	"Jai An no tē ma" (M - 92 M - 160)
6.	"Jai An no Ri saitaru" (M - 88 uta Iriri)
7.	"Himitsudōgu no ongaku ~ himitsudōgu shōkai' Kai" (M - 61 M - 57 M- 78)
8.	"Dora e mon himitsu dōgu no sū e uta" (insu to 1 kōrasu)
9.	"Suneotto no o botcha manbo" (1 kōrasu)
10.	"Suneotto no tēma" (M -82 M - 159)
11.	"Otonari no purinse su" (1 kōra su)
12.	"Shizuka-chan no tē ma" (M - 93)
13.	"Shizuka- chan no vu~a iorin" (M - 77)
14.	"Nobita-kun 0-ten" (1 kōrasu)
15.	"Nobita-kun no tēma sono 1" (M - 125 M - 85)
16.	"Nobita-kun no tēma sono 2" (M - 44 M - 27)
17.	"Kimi no naka no nobi futo" (1 kōra su)
18.	"Kandō! Tēma sono 1" (M - 11 M - 143)
19.	"Kandō! Tēma sono 2" (M- 5 M - 9)
20.	"Sasupe nsu tēma sono 1" (M - 55 M - 79)

=== Doraemon To Nakamatachi Song Collection ===
No.	Title	Length
1.	"Yume Wo Kanaete Doraemon"
2.	"Manmaru Boku Ga Doraemon"
3.	"Nobita Kun 0 Ten"
4.	"Suneo No Oboccha Manbo"
5.	"Oto Nari No Princess"
6.	"Sokonoke! Jaian-sama Da"
7.	"Yume Wo Kikasete"
8.	"Odore Dore Dora Doraemon Ondo 2007"

=== Doraemon uta no dai kōshin ===
No.	Title	Length
1.	"Yume wo kanaete Doraemon"
2.	"Susume! Doraemon māchi"
3.	"Doraemon nanafushigi ~sono ichi ~"
4.	"Doraemon himitsudōgu no kazoeuta"
5.	"Doraemon e kaki uta"
6.	"Doramichan'noekakiuta"
7.	"Doraemon nanafushigi ~ sono ni ~"
8.	"Kimi no naka no Nobita"

=== Doraemon Eigo no Uta ===
No.	Title	Length
1.	"Tōku 1 ōpuningu"
2.	"ABCD Doraemon"
3.	"Tōku 2"
4.	"The Alphabet (ABC no uta)"
5.	"Tōku 3"
6.	"Seven Steps (Sebun Suteppusu)"
7.	"Tōku 4"
8.	"Hello (harō)"
9.	"What’ s Your name? (Anata no o na ma e wa? )"
10.	"Goodbye matane"
11.	"Tōku 5"
12.	"Hokey Pokey (hōkī pōkī)"
13.	"Head, Shoulders, Knees and Toes (a tama,-kata, hiza, tsu Masaki)"
14.	"I’ m a Little Teapot (watashi wa chīsana tīpotto)"
15.	"Where Is Doraemon? (Doraemon doko? )"
16.	"Tōku 6"
17.	"Old MacDonald Had a Farm (Makudonarudo ojīsan no yu kaina nōjō)"
18.	"Ten Little Minidoras (10-ri no minidora)"
19.	"Row, Row, Row Your Boat (koge koge, bōto o)"
20.	"Tōku 7"

=== Doraemon TV Soundtrack Collection ===
Đĩa 1
No.	Title	Length
1.	"Yume wo Kanaete Doraemon (夢をかなえてドラえもん)" (mao)
2.	"Hagushichao (ハグしちゃお)" (Natsukawa Rimi, TV)
3.	"Boku Doraemon (ぼくドラえもん)" (Ōyama Nobuyo)
4.	"Doraemon no Uta (ドラえもんのうた)" (Ōsugi Kumiko, TV)
5.	"Doraemon no Uta (ド ラえもんのうた)" (Satoko Yamano, TV)
6.	"Doraemon no Uta (ドラえもんのうた)" (Tokyo Purin, TV)
7.	"Doraemon no Uta (ドラえもんのうた)" (Watanabe Misato, TV)
8.	"Doraemon no Uta (ドラえもんのうた)" (AJI, TV)
9.	"Doraemon Ekaki-uta (ドラえもん・えかきうた)" (Mizuta Wasabi)
10.	"Dorami-chan Ekaki-uta (ドラミちゃんのえかきうた)" (Chiaki)
11.	"Doraemon Ekaki-uta (ドラえもん・えかきうた)" (Ōyama Nobuyo)
12.	"Dorami-chan Ekaki-uta (ドラミちゃんのえかきうた)" (Yokozawa Keiko)

Đĩa 2
No.	Title	Length
1.	"Aoi Sora wa Pocket sa (青い空はポケットさ)" (Ōsugi Kumiko)
2.	"Maru-gao no Uta (まる顔のうた)" (Ōyama Nobuyo)
3.	"Santa Claus ha Doko no Hito (サンタクロースはどこのひと)" (Ōyama Nobuyo)
4.	"Boku-tachi Chikyuu-jin (ぼくたち地球人)" (Horie Mitsuko)
5.	"Aozora-tte Iina (青空っていいな)" (Horie Mitsuko)
6.	"Ashitamo♥Tomodachi (あしたも♥ともだち)" (Nishiwaki Yui)
7.	"Boku Doraemon 2112 (ぼくドラえもん2112)" (Ōyama Nobuyo)
8.	"Mata Aeru Hi Made (またあえる日まで)" (Yuzu)
9.	"Tanpopo no Uta (タンポポの詩 歌)" (The Alfee)
10.	"YUME Biyori (YUME日和)" (Shimatani Hitomi)
11.	"Aa Ii na! (あぁ いいな!)" (W)
12.	"Doraemon Ondo (ドラえもん音頭)" (Ōyama Nobuyo)
13.	"Odore Dore Dora Doraemon Ondo (踊れ・どれ・ドラ ドラえもん音頭)" (Mizuta Wasabi và Doraemon kids)
14.	"Odore Dore Dora Doraemon Ondo 2007 (踊れ・どれ・ドラ ドラえもん音頭 2007)" (Wasabi Mizuta và Doraemon kids)
15.	"Doraemon (Doraemon)" (Gen Hoshino)

=== Doraemon Soundtrack History 2 ===
Đĩa 1
No.	Title	Length
1.	"Purorōgu ~ ken no densetsu ~"
2.	"Suneotto to Parao no shashin"
3.	"Nobita to Doraemon"
4.	"Shin'ya no machi ga kaitei ni"
5.	"Sofia to tomodachi"
6.	"Akua hoshi no omoide"
7.	"Tomodachi ni narou"
8.	"Buikin to umi gyozoku"
9.	"Densetsu no suichū toshi"
10.	"Umi e!~ Kyodai utsubo no kōgeki"
11.	"Torae rareta shizukachan"
12.	"Sō kōgeki"
13.	"Yogen"
14.	"Ken no chikara"
15.	"Akiramenaide!"
16.	"Gyakuten no shōri!~ Kiseki no umi"
17.	"Nobita no fushigina yume"
18.	"Bānzu hakase no sengaikatsudō"
19.	"Akichi sōdō"
20.	"Jikū no yugami"
21.	"Fushigi seibutsu no sumu wakusei"
22.	"Kōyakōya hoshi e ~ Nobita to roppuru-kun"
23.	"Uchū-sen pāto 1"
24.	"Garutaito kōgyō"
25.	"Kimi ga warau sekai uta/ Ayaka U~Iruson"
26.	"Roppuru-kun to no yakusoku"
27.	"Nobita ga hīrō ni!"
28.	"Ma no keikoku e"
29.	"Tsukihi wa nagarete ~ kōyakōya-boshi no ichi-nen"
30.	"Girāmin no inbō"
31.	"Uchū-sen pāto 2"
32.	"Tachiagare, yūsha yo"
33.	"Saigonotatakai (Nobita tai girāmin)"
34.	"Ikiteita bānzu hakase ~sayonara, roppurukun"
35.	"Uchū kara no keikoku"
36.	"Mori-tachi wa ikite iru"
37.	"Fushigina ki"
38.	"Hajimemashite, kī bō!"
39.	"Kī bō no itazura"
40.	"Heri yuku ryokuchi"
41.	"A kūkan no heishi"
42.	"Yōkoso, midori no wakusei e"
43.	"Atarashī sekai"
44.	"Futatsunotsuki no monogatari"

Đĩa 2
No.	Title	Length
1.	"Midorinokyojinden"
2.	"Yama to roku"
3.	"Mori no serenāde"
4.	"Rīre no nyūjō"
5.	"Densetsu no fukkatsu"
6.	"Kī bō, Kyojin e"
7.	"Kī bō to boku"
8.	"Inochi o tsumugu subete no mono-tachi ~ kono hoshi ni uma rete"
9.	"Sayonara, kī bō"
10.	"Moshimo mahō ga tsukaetara"
11.	"Ochite kita sekizō"
12.	"Yami no ō demaon"
13.	"Mahō no sekai e"
14.	"Chinkarahoi!"
15.	"Akuma to no torihiki"
16.	"Demaon to mejūsa"
17.	"Jukai no mori no doragon"
18.	"Makaisei e shuppatsu!"
19.	"Tsukiyo no henshin"
20.	"Dorami-chan no himitsu dōgu"
21.	"Mogura tebukuro"
22.	"Shinden e"
23.	"Muteki no maō"
24.	"Akai tsuki o mezashite"
25.	"Kanashimi no saikai"
26.	"Demaon o yattsukero!"
27.	"Kyōryū no tsume"
28.	"Kaseki o hori ni"
29.	"Doraemon no atatakai me"
30.	"Tanjō"
31.	"Nobita to pī jo"
32.	"Shin'ya no kōen"
33.	"Pī suke to no wakare"
34.	"Kuroi masuku no otoko"
35.	"Pī suke o tsukamaero!"
36.	"Taimu mashin ga kowa re chatta"
37.	"Haku aki ni ~ puteranodon kyūshū! !"
38.	"Orumimusu ni notte"
39.	"Suichū no warutsu"
40.	"Dorumanshutain no korekushon"
41.	"Tiranosaurusu futatabi"
42.	"Kyōryū ōkoku no fukkatsu"
43.	"Sayonara, pī suke"

=== Doraemon Twin Best ===
Đĩa 1
No.	Title	Length
1.	"Yume wo Kanaete Doraemon" (Mao)
2.	"Doraemon Nanafushigi" (Morinoki Childrena Chorus Group)
3.	"Doraemon Himitsu Dougu no Kazoe uta" (Mizuta Wasabi)
4.	"Doraemon ekaki uta" (Mizuta Wasabi)
5.	"Dorami chan no Ekaki uta" (Chiaki)
6.	"Doraemon Nanafushigi" (Morinoki Childrena Chorus Group)
7.	"Kimi no Naka no Nobita" (Horie Mitsuko)
8.	"Manmaru Boku ga Doraemon" (Mizuta Wasabi)
9.	"Nobita kun rei ten" (Ohara Megumi)
10.	"Suneo no Oboccha Mambo" (Seki Tomokazu)
11.	"Otonari no Princess" (Kakazu Yumi)
12.	"Soko Noke!Jaian sama da" (Kimura Subaru)
13.	"Yume wo Kikasette" (Mizuta Wasabi)
14.	"Odore dora dora Doraemon ondo" (Mizuta Wasabi)
15.	"Susume!Doraemon March" (Mizuta Wasabi)
16.	"Jaian ni Boeboe" (Kimura Subaru)
17.	"Aozoratte inna" (Horie Mitsuko)
18.	"Pokapoka Fuwafuwa" (Osugi Kumiko)
19.	"Doraemon no Yume" (Yamano Satoko)
20.	"Hello! Dorami chan" (Yamano Satoko)

Đĩa 2
No.	Title	Length
1.	"Doraemon no Uta" (Osugi Kumiko)
2.	"Aoi sora ha Pocket sa" (Osugi Kumiko)
3.	"Doraemon ondo" (Oyama Nobuyo)
4.	"Boku Doraemon" (Oyama Nobuyo)
5.	"Wanpaku Sannin Gumi" (Ohara Noriko)
6.	"Doradora dokoka ni Doraemon" (Osugi Kumiko)
7.	"Boku tachi Chikyuujin" (Horie Mitsuko)
8.	"Yojigen Pocket" (Yamano Satoko)
9.	"Doraemon Kazoe uta" (Oyama Nobuyo)
10.	"Doraemon Jaanii" (Oyama Nobuyo)
11.	"Suteki na Isshuukan" (Koorogi`73)
12.	"Ii yatsu Nandayo Doraemon" (Osugi Kumiko)
13.	"Doraemon Shiritori uta" (Koorogi`73)
14.	"Doraemon New Year" (Oyama Nobuyo)
15.	"Santa Claus ha Doko no Hito" (Oyama Nobuyo)
16.	"Zou san no Hitomi ha Naze aoi" (Osugi Kumiko)
17.	"Ukiuki Time Travel" (Koorogi`73)
18.	"Doraemon Komoriuta" (Osugi Kumiko)
19.	"Doraemon March" (Koorogi`73)
20.	"Marugao no Uta" (Oyama Nobuyo)

=== Stand by Me Doraemon Original Soundtrack ===
Stand by Me Doraemon Original Soundtrack
No.	Title	Length
1.	"Một ngày của Nobita (のび太の一日, Nobita no Ichinichi)"	2:13
2.	"Tựa mở đầu Doraemon Đôi bạn thân (STAND BY MEドラえもんOpening Title, Stand by Me Doraemon Opening Title)"	1:09
3.	"Mình là Doraemon (ぼく、ドラ えも, Boku, Doraemon)"	0:54
4.	"Chong chóng tre (タケコプター, Takecopter)"	2:48
5.	"Túi không gian bốn chiều (四次元ポケット, Yojigen Pocket)"	3:25
6.	"Quả trứng động vật theo mẹ (刷りこみたまご, Surikomi Tamago)"	1:14
7.	"Tình yêu của Suneo (スネ夫, Love Suneo Love)"	0:48
8.	"Kế hoạch thất bại (作戦失敗, Sakusen Shippai)"	1:13
9.	"Con tim tan vỡ (失恋?, Shitsuren?)"	2:02
10.	"Học bài (勉強, Benkyou)"	1:01
11.	"Kết quả bài kiểm tra (テストの結果, Test no Kekka)"	2:00
12.	"Tạm biệt Shizuka (さようなら、しずかちゃん, Sayounara, Shizuka-chan)"	3:53
13.	"Côn trùng hôi/Phóng xạ khó chịu (ムシスカン, Mushisukan)"	2:02
14.	"Tương lai của tôi (ぼくの未来, Boku no Mirai)"	2:59
15.	"Thiếu niên Nobita (のび太青年 Nobita Seinen)"	2:11
16.	"Hãy đến với cậu ấy, ký ức (届け、この記憶！, Todoke, Kono Kioku!)"	1:55
17.	"Tình bạn (ともだち, Tomodachi)"	2:55
18.	"Đi đến tương lai (未来飛行, Mirai Hikou)"	1:37
19.	"Đêm trước ngày cưới (結婚前夜, Kekkon Zen'ya)"	2:59
20.	"Giọt lệ của Doraemon (ドラえもんの涙, Doraemon no Namida)"	1:31
21.	"Lời hứa (約束, Yakusoku)"	4:10
22.	"Trở về - Phép màu từ nước nói dối (再会 ～ウソ800の奇跡～, Saikai ~Uso 800 no Kiseki~)"	1:57
Total length:		46:56

=== Doraemon Main Theme Song Collection ===
Disc 1
No.	Title	Length
1.	"Boku Doraemon" (Oyama Nobuyo)
2.	"Pocket no Naka ni" (Oyama Nobuyo)
3.	"Kokoro wo Yurashi te" (Iwabuchi Makoto)
4.	"Doraemon no Uta" (Osugi Kumiko)
5.	"Dakara Minna de" (Iwabuchi Makoto)
6.	"Umi ha Boku ra To" (Iwabuchi Makoto)
7.	"Shounen ki" (Takeda Tetsuya)
8.	"Watashi ga Fushigi" (Osugi Kumiko)
9.	"Tomodachi da Kara" (Oyama Nobuyo)
10.	"Kimi ga Iru Kara" (Horie Mitsuko)
11.	"Doraemon no Uta" (Yamano Satoko)
12.	"Toki no Tabibito" (Nishida Toshiyuki)
13.	"Ten made Todoke" (Shiratori Emiko)
14.	"Yume no Yuku e" (Shiratori Emiko)
15.	"Kumo ga Yuku no Ha" (Takeda Tetsuya)
16.	"Nani ka Ii koto Kitto Aru KA" (Shimazaki Wakano)
17.	"Sekai ha Gu Choki Pa" (Takeda Tetsuya, Ichiza)
18.	"Yume no Hito" (Takeda Tetsuya, Ichiza)
19.	"Sayonara ni Sayonara" (Kaientai)
20.	"Watashi no Naka no Ginga" (Kaientai)
21.	"Love is you" (Yazawa Eikichi)

Disc 2
No.	Title	Length
1.	"Doraemon no Uta" (Yoshikawa Hinano)
2.	"Hot Milk" (Yoshikawa Hinano)
3.	"Kisetsu ga Iku Toki" (Speed)
4.	"Doraemon no Uta" (The Vienna Boys' Choir)
5.	"Kono Hoshi no Dokoka de" (Yuki Saori)
6.	"Love you close" (Chinen Rina)
7.	"Issho ni Aruko u-Walking into Sunshine-" (Konishiko)
8.	"Hitori ja Nai-I'll be there-" (Konishiki với Niiyama Chiharu)
9.	"Mata Aeru hi Made" (Yuzu)
10.	"Yume Biyori" (Shimatani Hitomi)
11.	"Hagushichao" (Natsukawa Rimi)
12.	"Boku Noto" (Sukima Switch)
13.	"Kakegae no Nai shi" (Mihimaru GT)
14.	"Yume wo Kanaete Doraemon" (Mao)
15.	"Te wo Tsunagou" (Ayaka)
16.	"Taisetsu ni Suru yo" (Shibasaki Kou)
17.	"Kimi ga Warau Sekai" (Ayaka Wilson)
18.	"Kaeru Basho" (Aoyama Thelma)
19.	"Tooi Umi kara Ki ta Anata" (Takeda Tetsuya)

Đĩa 3
No.	Title	Length
1.	"Tomodachi no Uta" (Bump of Chicken)
2.	"Iki Tell ikiteku" (Fukuyawa Masaharu)
3.	"Kimi no Hikari" (Horie Mitsuko)
4.	"Mirai no Musium" (Perfume)
5.	"Hikari no Signal" (Kis-My-Ft2)
6.	"Tomodachi" (Kimura Subaru)
7.	"Yume wo Kanaete Doraemon" (Hibari Childrens Chorus Group)
8.	"Yume wo Kanaete Doraemon" (Doraemon)
9.	"Miracle Ginga Bouei Tai no Theme" (Suginami Childrens Chorus Group)
10.	"Hello!Dorami chan" (Yamano Satoko)
11.	"Tomodachi na Noni" (Kuko)
12.	"Boku Doraemon 2112" (Oyama Nobuyo)
13.	"Itoshi no Nyao" (Yokoyawa Chisa)
14.	"Tomodachi da Kara'97" (Yamano Satoko)
15.	"Aoi Sora ha Pocket sa" (Yamano Satoko)
16.	"Warera The Doraemon zu" (Horie Mitsuko)
17.	"Shiawase no Door" (Nakanishi Yasushi)
18.	"Boku ra no Genki" (Horie Mitsuko)
19.	"Hagu Shiyou" (Takekawa Yukihide & T's COMPANY)
20.	"Dorami Gamusharara!!Heccharara!!" (Yokozawa Keiko)
21.	"Sayonara to ha Iwa Nai de" (Da Capo)
22.	"Kimi ni Eye Taku te" (Kosaka Akiko)
