= Satoko Yamano =

Satoko Yamano may refer to:

- Satoko Yamano (Oh My Goddess!), a character in Oh My Goddess!
- Satoko Yamano (voice actress) (born 1963), Japanese singer and voice actress
