= Hagushichao =

Single by Rimi Natsukawa

from the album Hagushichao
- A-side: "Hagushichao"
- B-side: "Yuimaru"
- Released: December 21, 2005
- Recorded: 2005
- Genre: J-Pop, Anison
- Length: 3:49
- Label: Victor Entertainment
- Composer: Ryudo Uzaki
- Lyricist: Yoko Aki

Rimi Natsukawa singles chronology
"Sayōnara Arigatō" (2005)	"Hagushichao" (2005)	"Sayōnara Arigatō (Ama no Kaze)/Mirai" (2006)

"Hagushichao" (ハグしちゃお / Tightly Hug) is a single by Rimi Natsukawa, released by Victor Entertainment.

The single served as the main theme song for the 2005 Doraemon series, replacing "Doraemon no Uta", before being replaced by "Yume wo Kanaete Doraemon" on May 11, 2007.

== History ==
Replacing "Doraemon no Uta" performed by Twelve Girls Band, "Hagushichao" was used as the opening theme song for the Doraemon television anime series from October 28, 2005 to April 20, 2007 before being replaced by "Yume wo Kanaete Doraemon" performed by mao on May 11, 2007.

It also served as the opening theme song for the 2005 series Doraemon movies Doraemon: Nobita's Dinosaur 2006 and Doraemon: Nobita's New Great Adventure into the Underworld ~The Seven Magic Users~.

== Track listing ==
CD
No.	Title	Arranger(s)	Length
1.	"Hagushichao (ハグしちゃお)"	Seiichi Kyōda	3:49
2.	"Yuimaru (ゆいま〜る)"	Chuei Yoshikawa	4:53
3.	"Hagushichao (ハグしちゃお)" (Instrumental)	Seiichi Kyōda	3:49
4.	"Yuimaru (ゆいま〜る)" (Instrumental)	Chuei Yoshikawa	4:52
Total length:			17:23
