= Doraemon: Nobita's Dinosaur 2006 =

2006 film by Ayumu Watanabe

Doraemon the Movie: Nobita's Dinosaur 2006
- Theatrical release poster

Japanese name
- Kanji: 映画ドラえもん のび太の恐竜2006
- Literal meaning: Doraemon: Nobita's Dinosaur 2006
Transcriptions
- Revised Hepburn: Doraemon: Nobita no Kyōryū 2006
- Directed by: Ayumu Watanabe
- Written by: Ayumu Watanabe; Kōzō Kusuba
- Story by: Fujiko F. Fujio
- Based on: Doraemon's Long Tales: Noby's Dinosaur by Fujiko F. Fujio
- Produced by: Shin-Ei Animation
- Starring: Wasabi Mizuta; Megumi Ōhara; Yumi Kakazu; Tomokazu Seki; Subaru Kimura; Ryunosuke Kamiki; Kotono Mitsuishi; Yasunori Matsumoto; Eiichiro Funakoshi; Kenji Utsumi; Minami Takayama
- Edited by: Hajime Okayasu
- Music by: Kan Sawada
- Production company: Shin-Ei Animation
- Distributed by: Toho
- Release date: March 4, 2006 (Japan)
- Running time: 107 minutes
- Country: Japan
- Language: Japanese
- Box office: $34.7 million

Doraemon: Nobita's Dinosaur 2006 (映画ドラえもん のび太の恐竜2006, Doraemon: Nobita no Kyōryū 2006), also known as Doraemon: The Movie 2006 and Doraemon and the Little Dinosaur, is a 2006 Japanese animated science fiction adventure film and is a remake of the first Doraemon film Doraemon: Nobita's Dinosaur, released in 1980. Directed by Ayumu Watanabe, the film was released theatrically in Japan on 4 March 2006. It's the 26th Doraemon film. The film got a private screening with English subtitles in Washington, D.C., on 14 November 2008, making it the first time Doraemon made an appearance in the US. The movie grossed over 3.28 billion yen.

This movie ranked as the 6th highest-grossing movie and the highest grossing animated movie in 2006 of both Japan and the United States. It is the first Doraemon film to be considered part of the 2005 series and to star the current Japanese voice cast.

The film's taglines are "I can do my best because you're here" (君がいるから、がんばれる。) and "New Doraemon the Movie." (うまれたて、映画ドラえもん。)

== Plot ==
Suneo shows everyone a fossilized claw of a Tyrannosaurus, and Nobita is angry that he doesn't get a look. Nobita claims that he will be able to find a living dinosaur. Panicking, Nobita researches dinosaurs and starts digging in a hill, but then, the landlord forces him to dig a hole.

Nobita unearths an egg fossil. Using the time-wrap, he returns it to its original form and plans to hatch it. A young Futabasaurus comes out of it, and Nobita decides to name him Piisuke. Nobita doesn't show it to Gian and Suneo due to Piisuke being too small and says he would have to eat spaghetti through his nose if he lies. Meanwhile, Nobita and Piisuke form a strong bond between them with Nobita working very hard to make sure Piisuke is well looked after and grows attached.

Piisuke grows too big to stay in Nobita's closet and has to be moved to a lake. However, the next day when Nobita goes to visit him he hears that Piisuke was seen and when he gets to the lake it's flooded with reporters and is unable to take him home. Nobita is then visited by the Black Mask, a mysterious assailant from the 24th century, who wants to purchase Piisuke but flees soon after.

When night comes, Nobita takes Piisuke away after Doraemon distracts all who gathered there. He escapes with Piisuke and he and Doraemon use the time machine to take Piisuke back to the Late Cretaceous. On the way there however, the time machine is attacked by the Black Mask, who intends to capture Piisuke no matter what. Nobita, Doraemon and Piisuke manage to escape but the time machine is damaged. They leave Piisuke in prehistoric times and return home with Nobita crying the entire way.

Gian, Shizuka and Suneo do not believe that Nobita has raised a dinosaur and he angrily uses the Time TV. However, they see Piisuke being bullied by sharp-toothed Elasmosaurus. Doraemon says because, while on the time machine, they have accidentally left Piisuke in Hell Creek instead of Japan. Nobita and Doraemon decide to head back with the others tagging along as well.

Nobita finds Piisuke and his friends apologize for not believing him, they then plan to take Piisuke back to modern times and then to Cretaceous Japan. Doraemon who sees the time machine destroyed suggests they stay while he tries to fix it. However, when they're attacked by a Tyrannosaurus and the kids want to go home, Doraemon admits that the time machine is broken. At first, the kids are scared, but Doraemon says they can use the bamboo-copters to go to Japan to take Piisuke back to the end of the Cretaceous period, and they set off on a long journey to do so, exploring the prehistoric world as they go. They then befriend a flock of Ornithomimus, who give them a ride before dropping them off at a lake. There, the group encounter a herd of Alamosaurus and are once again attacked by a Tyrannosaurus, but they tame it with the Momotaro Dango.

Then, after getting chased by a flock of Quetzalcoatlus, they are cornered by the Black Mask and the other several assailants, who reveal they are dinosaur hunters working for a fossil collector named Dolmanstein from the 24th century and had stalked them the whole way. They say they will consider it but plant a decoy and attempt to escape. Their plan is foiled, and Gian, Shizuka and Suneo get captured by the hunters. Doraemon and Nobita rush to save them, and all five have to face being eaten by a ferocious Tyrannosaurus, but they realize that it was one of the tamed dinosaurs. The hunters are all defeated by a Triceratops, a Pachycephalosaurus and a Euoplocephalus, while the Tyrannosaurus defeats Dolmanstein's pet Spinosaurus.

The Time Police arrives on scene to discover the hunters in a cage, and the group gone. The five decides to walk to Japan by themselves and encounters the Time Police, who acknowledges their heroic actions with a salute. When they arrive, the group bids farewell to Piisuke and return to their own timeline.

== Cast ==
Character	Japanese voice actor
Doraemon	Wasabi Mizuta
Nobita Nobi	Megumi Ōhara
Shizuka Minamoto	Yumi Kakazu
Takeshi "Gian" Gōda	Subaru Kimura
Suneo Honekawa	Tomokazu Seki
Piisuke	Ryunosuke Kamiki
Black Mask	Eiichiro Funakoshi
Dolmanstein	Kenji Utsumi
Tamako Nobi (Nobita's mother)	Kotono Mitsuishi
Nobisuke Nobi (Nobita's father)	Yasunori Matsumoto
Mrs. Honekawa (Suneo's mother)	Minami Takayama
Pregnant Woman	Masayo Kurata
Girls	Sumomo Momomori; Tomoe Sakuragawa
Boys	Misato Fukuen; Aya Yamashita
Divers	Funihiko Goto; Yuki Shimowada; Masaaki Koda
Time Patrol members	Sukima Switch
Minions	Naomi Kusumi; Hidenari Ugaki; Yasuhiro Takato; Masafumi Kimura
Newscaster	Hitori Gekidan

== Soundtrack ==
=== Theme songs ===
"Hagushichao" (ハグしちゃお)
Lyrics: Yoko Aki / Composition: Ryudo Uzaki / Arrangement: Seiichi Kyoda / Vocals: Rimi Natsukawa
"My Note" (ボクノート)
Lyrics: Takuya Ohashi, Shintarō Tokita / Composition: Takuya Ohashi, Shintarō Tokita / Arrangement: Takuya Ohashi, Shintarō Tokita / Vocals: Sukima Switch

== See also ==
- List of films featuring dinosaurs
- List of Doraemon films
