= Satoko Yamano (voice actress) =

Japanese voice actress and singer (born 1963)

- 山野 さと子
- Born: Tomoko Yamano (山野 智子); August 2, 1963 (age 63); Higashiōsaka, Osaka, Japan
- Other name: Satoko-oneesan (さとこおねえさん)
- Education: Osaka Jogakuin Junior College
- Occupations: Voice actress; singer
- Years active: 1980–present
- Agent: Ask Music
- Label: Nippon Columbia

Satoko Yamano (山野 さと子, Yamano Satoko; born August 2, 1963) is a Japanese voice actress and singer from Higashiōsaka, Osaka, Japan.

She is known for having performed over 1,000 songs, famously the second opening rendition of Doraemon no Uta that was used as the opening theme song for the Doraemon television series from 1992 to 2002 and for the Doraemon films from 1989 to 2004.

== Filmography ==
=== Television animation ===
List of voice performances in television animation
Year	Title	Role	Notes	Source
1986	Maple Town	Puripurin Pick		
1987	New Maple Town Stories: Palm Town Chapter	Sheila, Sammy		
1987	GeGeGe no Kitarō	Yumi, Queen Mermaid		
1988	Bikkuriman	Jinkōshi, Shōkōshi		
1988	City Hunter 2	Kozue Makihara	Eps. 47-48	
1988	Topo Gigio	Gina		
1988	The Secret of Akko-chan	Aisei Yumi		
1990	Oishinbo	Yarimura's sister		
1990	Pygmalio	Orie the Crystal Princess		
1992	Ultraman Kids: 30 Million Light Years Looking for Mama	Doris		
1997	Grander Musashi	Mio Hoshiyama		
1998	Grander Musashi RV	Mio Hoshiyama		
1998	Sakura Momoko Gekijō Coji-Coji	Little Girl, Girl		

=== Theatrical animation ===
List of voice performances in theatrical animation
Year	Title	Role	Notes	Source
1987	New Maple Town Stories: Palm Town Chapter	Puripurin Pick		
1988	Saint Seiya: Kamigami No Atsuki Tatakai	Freyja		

== Discography ==
=== Music ===
- Pink, Pink, PINK - Dokincho! Nemurin
- Yoake no Yumeoibtio - Silver Fang
- Cosmos Adventure and Twinkle Twinkle Wink ~Onegai Shooting Star~ - Ultraman Kids: 30 Million Light Years Looking for Mama
- Fancy Girl - The Wonderful Wizard of Oz
- Doraemon no Uta (Version 2) - Doraemon
- Hello! Dorami-chan - Dorami-chan
