= Spacetoon India =

Indian media and licensing company

Spacetoon India is an Indian media and licensing company. It was established in 2006. Spacetoon has more than 70 licensing deals, including for Crayon Shin-chan, Doraemon and Hello Kitty. The company also creates original intellectual property, including Fafa & Juno. The brand ambassadorship for the launch of Spacetoon India came from Vidya Balan. Spacetoon India has also sponsored the Nahni Kali foundation.

In November 2005, Spacetoon partnered with Sahara One to create Spacetoon Hour, an hour-long broadcast of animated and live action series culled from SpaceToon Media Group's library. The broadcast was later cancelled.

On 15 January 2009, Spacetoon launched a free-to-air channel in India. Broadcasting was later discontinued. Spacetoon has sister channels in the Arab world.

== Spacetoon India programmes ==
The following shows were broadcast on Spacetoon India:

- Action Man
- Auto Cat (Cyborg Kuro Chan)
- Horrid Henry
- Bump in the Night
- Enchanted Princess Party
- The Great Book of Nature
- Hello Kitty
- Incredible Dennis
- Inspector Fabre
- Inspector Gadget's Field Trip
- Little Clowns of Happytown
- Lost Universe
- OffSide
- Plusters
- Ryukendo
- Fafa & Juno
- Sherlock Holmes
- Simba The King Lion
- Sonic the Hedgehog
- Super Litte Fanta Heroes
- Toy Toons
- Wild West Cow Boys of Moo Mesa
- Willow Town
- Nobody's Girl Remi
- Shin Hakkenden
- Baby & Me
