= Doraemon (1979 TV series) =

1979 Japanese anime television series

- Logo
- ドラえもん
- Based on: Doraemon by Fujiko F. Fujio
- Directed by: Ryo Motohira; Tsutomu Shibayama
- Music by: Shunsuke Kikuchi
- Country of origin: Japan
- Original language: Japanese
- No. of episodes: 1,787 + 30 specials (list of episodes)

Production
- Running time: 10 minutes (#1–617); 23–24 minutes (#618–1787)
- Production companies: TV Asahi; Asatsu-DK (Note: Previously credited as Asatsu until 1999); Shin-Ei Animation

Original release
- Network: ANN (TV Asahi)
- Release: April 2, 1979 – March 18, 2005

Related
- 1973 anime; 2005 anime

Doraemon (ドラえもん) is a Japanese anime television series based on Fujiko F. Fujio's manga of the same name and the successor to the original 1973 anime series. Produced by Shin-Ei Animation, Asatsu-DK and TV Asahi, Doraemon premiered in Japan on April 2, 1979, and has been dubbed for broadcast in 60 countries worldwide. The series lasted 26 years and had over 1,787 episodes and 30 specials, making it the longest of the three animated shows created to date. This Doraemon anime series is sometimes referred to in Asia as the Ōyama Edition (大山版), after Nobuyo Ōyama, the voice actress who voices Doraemon in this series.

Two official English dubs of this anime series have been released, the first of which was called The Adventures of Albert and Sidney, which was produced in Canada by CINAR and aired exclusively in Barbados on CBC TV 8 during the late 1980s and early 1990s. In the United States, the series was planned to air on Superstation WTBS, now known as TBS, but would never premiere for unknown reasons. The second dub was made in Singapore and aired on Channel i & Kids Central from 2002 to 2003 in Singapore. Additionally, an unofficial bootleg English dub by Speedy Video was produced and released exclusively in Malaysia on various VCDs.

== Premise ==
The series follows the titular character, a cat-like robot from the 22nd century who travels to the present day to help an uneducated, naïve, and clumsy 10-year-old elementary school boy named Nobita Nobi to guide him in the proper direction for his future. Nobita's friends include Shizuka Minamoto, his closest friend and love interest, as well as Takeshi "Gian" Gōda and Suneo Honekawa, who, while sometimes kind, frequently abuse and bully him. A typical episode of the series involves Nobita asking Doraemon for a gadget (usually to help him with a personal task or to get back at Gian and Suneo). Normally, these gadgets end up causing chaos for Nobita and those around him.

Doraemon, Nobita, Shizuka, Suneo, and Gian as seen in the 1979-2005 series.

== Cast and characters ==
Character	Voice actor			Ref(s)
Character	Japanese	English (CINAR)	English (Singapore)	Ref(s)
Doraemon (Albert)	Nobuyo Ōyama	A.J. Henderson	Hossan Leong	
Nobita Nobi (Sidney)	Noriko Ohara	Steven Bednarski	Denise Tan	
Suneo Honekawa (Ricky)	Kaneta Kimotsuki		Hossan Leong	
Takeshi "Gian" Gōda (Buster)	Kazuya Tatekabe		Gerald Chew	
Shizuka Minamoto (Lucy)	Michiko Nomura	Alison Darcy	Denise Tan	
Dorami	Keiko Yokozawa		N/A	

== Production and broadcast ==
Following the finale of the 1973 series, the rights to the Doraemon manga were lost, as Nippon TeleMovie Productions, the production studio of the 1973 series, shut down the same day on the broadcast of the show's final episode. However, Daikichirō Kusube gained the author's trust and secured the rights to Tokyo Movie, a production firm where he was in charge of sales at the time.

In late 1976, the rights were transferred to Shin-Ei Animation as Tokyo Movie parted ways with Kusube which led to the latter becoming Tokyo Movie Shinsha. In late 1977, Kusube requested one out of two of the creators of Doraemon, Hiroshi Fujimoto, for permission to produce another anime series based on the manga.

Isao Takahata, whom Kusube had asked to do, prepared a proposal and submitted it to Fujimoto, who agreed with the plan. Shin-Ei Animation originally began selling the rights to Yomiuri TV, where Juichi Sano produced a full-scale proposal, but the idea failed due to a lack of understanding among the station's upper management and were later transferred to advertising agency Asatsu. Doraemon first began airing in Japan on TV Asahi on April 2, 1979.

Broadcast time for Doraemon (1979)
Television network	Broadcast date and time
Japan
TV Asahi	Monday to Saturday, 18:50 - 19:00 JST
TV Asahi	Friday, 5:00 - 5:30 JST
TV Asahi	Friday, 18:50 - 19:20 JST
TV Asahi	Friday 19:00 - 19:30 JST

== Episodes ==
Year	Episodes	Originally released	
Year	Episodes	First released	Last released
1979	235	April 2, 1979	December 31, 1979
1980	256	January 1, 1980	December 30, 1980
1981	152	January 1, 1981	December 25, 1981
1982	49	January 1, 1982	December 24, 1982
1983	52	January 1, 1983	December 30, 1983
1984	51	January 1, 1984	December 28, 1984
1985	52	January 1, 1985	December 27, 1985
1986	50	January 3, 1986	December 26, 1986
1987	60	January 2, 1987	December 25, 1987
1988	49	January 8, 1988	December 23, 1988
1989	54	January 6, 1989	December 29, 1989
1990	50	January 5, 1990	December 28, 1990
1991	51	January 4, 1991	December 27, 1991
1992	55	January 10, 1992	December 25, 1992
1993	70	January 8, 1993	December 24, 1993
1994	51	January 7, 1994	December 23, 1994
1995	48	January 6, 1995	December 22, 1995
1996	48	January 5, 1996	December 21, 1996
1997	51	January 10, 1997	December 23, 1997
1998	44	January 9, 1998	December 18, 1998
1999	45	January 8, 1999	December 31, 1999
2000	40	January 14, 2000	December 15, 2000
2001	41	January 12, 2001	December 14, 2001
2002	45	January 11, 2002	December 31, 2002
2003	45	January 17, 2003	December 12, 2003
2004	38	January 9, 2004	December 18, 2004
2005	10	January 7, 2005	March 18, 2005

== Music ==
=== Opening themes ===
The opening theme used for the weekly Doraemon series airing between 1979 and 2005 was Doraemon no Uta (ドラえもんのうた), which was performed by five different performers over the course of its years:

	Performer	Starting date	Starting episode	Ending date	Ending episode
1.	Kumiko Ōsugi (大杉久美子)	April 2, 1979	Episode 1	October 2, 1992	episode 1199
2.	Satoko Yamano (山野さと子)	October 9, 1992	Episode 1200	September 20, 2002	episode 1681
3.	Tokyo Purin (東京プリン)	October 4, 2002	episode 1682	April 11, 2003	episode 1705
4.	Misato Watanabe (渡辺美里)	April 18, 2003	episode 1706	April 23, 2004	episode 1752
5.	AJI	April 30, 2004	episode 1753	March 18, 2005	episode 1787

Two songs were used for a separate weekday Doraemon series which is a part of Fujiko Fujio Theater (藤子不二雄劇場, Fujiko Fujio Gekijoo), the first song being the same as the first song of the weekly series.

	Name	Song title	Starting date	Starting episode	Ending date	Ending episode
1.	Kumiko Ōsugi (大杉久美子)	"Doraemon no Uta" (ドラえもんのうた)	April 2, 1979	episode 1	September 29, 1979	episode 156
2.	Nobuyo Oyama, Koorogi '73 (大山のぶ代, こおろぎ'73)	"Boku Doraemon" (ぼくドラえもん)	October 1, 1979	episode 157	September 23, 1981	episode 617

=== Ending themes ===
The ending themes used for the weekly Doraemon series airing between 1979 and 2005 were:

	Song title	Performer	Starting date	Starting episode	Ending date	Ending episode
1.	"Aoi Sora wa Pocket sa" (青い空はポケットさ)	Kumiko Ōsugi (大杉久美子)	April 2, 1979	episode 1	September 23, 1981	episode 617
2.	"Maru-gao no Uta" (まる顔のうた)	Nobuyo Oyama (大山のぶ代)	October 1, 1981	episode 618	March 30, 1984	episode 757
3.	"Santa Claus wa Doko no Hito" (サンタクロースはどこのひと)	Nobuyo Oyama (大山のぶ代)	November 18, 1983	episode 738	December 30, 1983	episode 744
4.	"Boku-tachi Chikyuu-jin" (ぼくたち地球人)	Mitsuko Horie (堀江美都子)	April 6, 1984	episode 758	April 8, 1988	episode 971
5.	"Aozora-tte Iina" (青空っていいな)	Mitsuko Horie (堀江美都子)	April 15, 1988	episode 972	October 2, 1992	episode 1199
6.	"Ashita mo Tomodachi" (あしたも♥ともだち)	Yui Nishiwaki (にしわきゆい)	October 9, 1992	episode 1200	April 7, 1995	episode 1346
7.	"Boku Doraemon 2112" (ぼくドラえもん2112)	Nobuyo Oyama, Koorogi '73 (大山のぶ代、こおろぎ'73)	April 14, 1995	episode 1347	September 20, 2002	episode 1681
8.	"Mata Aeru Hi Made" (またあえる日まで)	Yuzu (ゆず)	October 4, 2002	episode 1682	April 11, 2003	episode 1705
9.	"Tanpopo no Uta" (タンポポの詩)	The Alfee (ジ・アルフィー)	April 18, 2003	episode 1706	October 3, 2003	episode 1729
10.	"YUME Biyori" (YUME日和)	Hitomi Shimatani (島谷ひとみ)	October 10, 2003	episode 1730	May 28, 2004	episode 1757
11.	"Aa Ii na!" (あぁ いいな!)	W (ダブルユー)	June 4, 2004	episode 1758	March 18, 2005	episode 1787

Three songs were used for the separate weekday Doraemon series. The start and end dates are not listed here, nor are the episodes they ran for.

	Song title	Performer
1.	"Doraemon Ekaki-uta" (ドラえもん・えかきうた)	Nobuyo Oyama (大山のぶ代)
2.	"Doraemon Ondo" (ドラえもん音頭)	Nobuyo Oyama, Koorogi '73 (大山のぶ代、こおろぎ'73)
3.	"Dorami-chan Ekaki-uta" (ドラミちゃんのえかきうた)	Keiko Yokozawa (横沢啓子)
