= Doraemon no Uta =

Single by Kumiko Ōsugi

from the album Doraemon
- A-side: "Doraemon no Uta"
- B-side: "Aoi Sora wa Poketto sa and Doraemon's Drawing Song"
- Released: April 25, 1979
- Recorded: 1979
- Genre: Anison, Children's music
- Length: 2:57
- Label: Nippon Columbia
- Composer: Shunsuke Kikuchi
- Lyricist: Takumi Kusube

Kumiko Ōsugi singles chronology
"Beaver-chan Come on in" (1979)	"Doraemon no Uta" (1979)	"Josefina the Whale" (1979)

"Doraemon no Uta" (ドラえもんのうた / Doraemon's Song) is a single by Kumiko Ōsugi. The single was the main theme song for the 1979 Doraemon series (Note: "Boku Doraemon" (ぼくドラえもん / I'm Doraemon) took its place from October 1, 1979 to September 23, 1981 while airing as part of the weekday Fujiko Fujio Theater block and was used as the main theme in the movies and short films released during this period. However, the song was kept for weekend broadcasts and specials during this period.) and was briefly the main theme song of the 2005 series before being replaced by "Hagushichao" on October 28, 2005.

Despite the song's retirement in 2005, it is still widely referred to as Doraemon's theme song and has become an iconic song in Japan as well as most countries that have received dubbed versions of the song.

== Composition ==
The original composition is coincidentally composed in D Major but many versions switch its composition to other keys like C Major. Three gadgets are explicitly mentioned in the original lyrics, the Takecopter, the Toy Soldiers and the Anywhere Door with those lines being performed by Doraemon voice actress Nobuyo Ōyama.

In the Misato Watanabe edition of the song, the second verse's lines for Doraemon were changed from "Here! Attack!" to "Everyone! Don't give up!"

== History ==
While serving as the main theme song for the 1979 series, the song's singer was changed a total of five times across the series' run from Kumiko Ōsugi to Satoko Yamano on October 9, 1992, (Note: The switch occurred in for the movies in 1989 with the release of Nobita and the Birth of Japan and was kept until 2004 with the exceptions of the films in 1998 and 2000 which were done by Hinano Yoshikawa and the Vienna Boys' Choir respectively.) from Satoko Yamano to Tokyo Purin on October 2, 2002, from Tokyo Purin to Misato Watanabe on April 18, 2003, and from Misato Watanabe to AJI on April 30, 2004. The song was then used as the first opening theme song for the 2005 series, performed instrumentally by the Twelve Girls Band.

The song managed to achieve the top position for the children's song and TV anime song charts in 1980.

After it was retired as the main theme, it was then used as an insert theme song in the first two movies of the 1979 series and as an ending theme for the 2005 series in 2006 specials. The song returned for a brief period of time as the opening theme song for the 2005 series on April 5, 2019, for the occasion of the anime's 40th anniversary with a special rendition performed by Wasabi Mizuta, Megumi Ōhara, Yumi Kakazu, Subaru Kimura, and Tomokazu Seki, the current voice actors of the five main characters.
