= Kumiko Ōsugi =

Japanese singer (born 1951)

- Also known as: Momoko Shibayama (柴山 モモコ)
- Born: Kumiko Ōsugi (大杉 久美子); July 10, 1951 (age 75)
- Genres: J-pop, Anison
- Occupation: Singer
- Instrument: Vocals
- Years active: 1964–present
- Labels: Crown Records; King Records; Bandai Music Entertainment; Columbia Music Entertainment

Kumiko Ōsugi (大杉久美子, Ōsugi Kumiko; born July 10, 1951) is a J-pop artist from Tokyo. In 1964, she recorded a song with Crown Records using the pseudonym Momoko Shibayama (柴山モモコ, Shibayama Momoko). The first song to be released under her real name was "Attack No. 1" (アタックNo.1, Atakku Nanbā Wan), the opening theme for the Attack No. 1 anime. She went on to perform theme songs for many other anime, including Doraemon, Aim for the Ace!, Araiguma Rascal, Flanders no Inu, and Oz no Mahōtsukai.

She is referred to by fans and the Japanese press as the "Queen of Anime Song" and is considered to be one of the "Four Heavenly Kings and Queens of Anison" (アニソン四天王) alongside Ichirou Mizuki, Isao Sasaki, and Mitsuko Horie.

The opening theme to Heidi, Girl of the Alps is often mis-attributed to Ōsugi when it was actually performed by Kayo Ishū, a studio singer. Ōsugi did, however, perform the series' ending theme.

== Early life ==
Ōsugi began taking singing lessons at eight years old, and in grade seven began singing with a group and in competitions.

== Discography ==
=== Anime songs ===
==== Opening songs ====
- "Attack No. 1" – Attack No. 1 (1969)
- "Ace wo Nerae!" – Ace wo Nerae (1973)
- "Shiawase wo Yobu Limit-chan" – Miracle Girl Limit-chan (1973)
- "Yoake no Michi" – Dog of Flanders (1975)
- "Sougen no Shojo Laura" – Laura, the Prairie Girl (1975)
- "Sōgen no Marco" – 3000 Leagues in Search of Mother (1976)
- "Paul's Adventure" – Paul's Miraculous Adventure (1976)
- "Don Chuck to issho ni" – Shin Don Chuck Monogatari (1976)
- "I'm Piccolino" – Piccolino no Bōken (1976)
- "Oki-na Kuma-ni Nattara" – Monarch: The Big Bear of Tallac (1977)
- "Rock River e" – Rascal the Raccoon (1977)
- "Perrine Monogatari" – The Story of Perrine (1978)
- "Doraemon no Uta" – Doraemon (1979)
- "3 jin no Uta" – Koraru no Tanken (1979)

==== Ending songs ====
- "Shiroi Tennis Court" – Ace wo Nerae (1973)
- "SENCHI na Limit-chan" – Miracle Girl Limit-chan (1973)
- "Mattete Gora" – Heidi, Girl of the Alps (1974)
- "Doko ma de mo Arukou ne" – Dog of Flanders (1975)
- "Laura no Komoriuta" – Laura, the Prairie Girl (1975)
- "Kaasan Ohayō" – 3000 Leagues in Search of Mother (1976)
- "Occult Hammer's Song" – Paul's Miraculous Adventure (1976)
- "In the Shade of the Olive Tree" – Piccolino no Bōken (1976)
- "Yumemiru Chuck" – Shin Don Chuck Monogatari (1976)
- "Shounen Mars" – Jetter Mars (1977)
- "Oyasumi Mars" – Jetter Mars (1977)
- "Ron to Jackie" – Monarch: The Big Bear of Tallac (1977)
- "Oide Rascal" – Rascal the Raccoon (1977)
- "Kimagure Baron" – The Story of Perrine (1978)
- "Aoi Sora wa Pocket sa" – Doraemon ED 2 (1979)
- "Yume miru Coral" – Koraru no Tanken (1979)
- "Tabisurya Tomodachi" – King Arthur: Prince on White Horse (1980)
- "Chiisai Kawa no Uta" – Mīmu Iro Iro Yume no Tabi (1983)
- "Maho-no Crayon" – The Wonderful Wizard of Oz (1986)
- "The Meridian of Hope ~ Horizon Blue" – Casshan (1993)
