= Sanae Kobayashi =

Japanese voice actress (born 1980)

- 小林 沙苗
- Born: 26 January 1980 (age 46); Hamakita, Shizuoka, Japan
- Occupation: Voice actress
- Years active: 1999–present
- Agent: Sigma Seven

Sanae Kobayashi (小林 沙苗, Kobayashi Sanae; born 26 January 1980) is a Japanese voice actress formerly affiliated with Production Baobab, and now with Sigma Seven. She has voiced in a number of anime shows and films. Some of her major roles are Allen Walker in D.Gray-man, Miyuki Tanokura in Kaze no Yojimbo, Akira Toya in Hikaru no Go, Asuka Tenjoin in Yu-Gi-Oh! GX, Chris Thorndyke in Sonic X, Natsumi Raimon in Inazuma Eleven, and Satsuki Kitaoji in Strawberry 100%. In more recent works, she voices Namie Yagiri in Durarara!!, Reiko Natsume in Natsume's Book of Friends, and Canon Memphis-Hazama in Fafner: Exodus. In video games, she voices Gemini Sunrise in Sakura Wars: So Long, My Love, Pai in .hack, Popo and Nana in the Super Smash Bros. series, Kat in Gravity Rush, and Natasha Cioara (Raven) in Honkai Impact 3rd.

== Filmography ==
=== Anime ===
List of voice performances in anime
Year	Title	Role	Notes	Source
1999	Cyborg Kuro-chan	Kyoko	Debut role.	
2000	Boogiepop Phantom	Manaka Kisaragi		
2000	Hajime no Ippo	Kumi Mashiba		
2001	Cosmic Baton Girl	Mira, Yuki-sensei, Taichi		
2001	Haré+Guu	Guu (large)		
2001	Geneshaft	Fumi, Karen, Lily		
2001	Kaze no Yojimbo	Miyuki Tanokura		
2001	Najica Blitz Tactics	Rena Uzuki, Humarion		
2001	Crush Gear Turbo	Kinryudai, Fuko Nagitori		
2001	Hikaru no Go	Akira Toya		
2001–2004	No Surface Moon the Animation	Suzuna Kuraki	OVA eps. 1–4 and special collection	
2001	Yobarete Tobedete! Akubi-chan	Erika Fujiwara		
2002	Mirage of Blaze	Female student B		
2002	Tokyo Underground	Al		
2002	Tokyo Mew Mew	Staff		
2002	Demon Lord Dante	Saori Utusugi		
2002	Petite Princess Yucie	Machimusume		
2002	Hanada Shōnen Shi	Kana		
2002	Heat Guy J	Antonia Belluchi		
2002	Monkey Typhoon	Ruruka		
2002	Naruto	Sasame Fuma		
2002	GetBackers	Maki Nagano		
2002	Macross Zero	Sara Nome		
2003	Nanaka 6/17	Chemical Kemiko, Amemiya's Mother		
2003	Someday's Dreamers	Haru Kikuchi		
2003	Ashita no Nadja	Roberta		
2003	E's Otherwise	Asuka Tokugawa		
2003	D.N.Angel	Ritsuko Fukuda		
2003	Kaleido Star	Agent		
2003	Mermaid Melody Pichi Pichi Pitch	Maria		
2003	Mythical Detective Loki Ragnarok	Yayoi Hirazaka		
2003	Astro Boy	Miss Midori		
2003	Sonic X	Christopher Thorndyke		
2003	Wonder Bebil-kun	Mama		
2003	Divergence Eve	Suzanna Bluestein, operator		
2003	New Fist of the North Star	young Sahra		
2003	Papuwa	Kotaro		
2003	Avenger	Coop		
2003	Cromartie High School	Female		
2003	Saiyuki Reload	Kinkaku, Ginkaku		
2003	Yami to Bōshi to Hon no Tabibito	Lilith		
2003	Requiem from the Darkness	Ogin		
2003	Gilgamesh	Fuko Omuro, Haruka Mayuzumi		
2004	Misaki Chronicles	Susanna Bluestein		
2004	Area 88	Kitori Parvenev		
2004	The Cosmopolitan Prayers	Scarlett Church		
2004	Hit no Nerae (Smash Hit)	Yoko Katsuragi		
2004	Mermaid Melody Pichi Pichi Pitch Pure	Maria, Fuku-chan, Lady Bat		
2004	Midori Days	Yuma Takiguchi		
2004	Madlax	Madlax		
2004	Melody of Oblivion	Toune Requiem		
2004	Dogtato	Haripoteto		
2004	Love Love?	Yoko Katsuragi		
2004	Fafner in the Azure	Canon Memphis		
2004	Elfen Lied	Lucy / Nyu		
2004	My-Hime	Akira Okuzaki		
2004	Yu-Gi-Oh! GX	Asuka Tenjoin		
2004	Genshiken	Kitagawa		
2004	Gakuen Alice	Kaname Sonô		
2005–2007	Buzzer Beater series	Cha-che		
2005	Majime ni Fumajime: Kaiketsu Zorori	Noshishi		
2005	Strawberry 100%	Satsuki Kitaoji	TV and OVAs	
2005–2007	Emma: A Victorian Romance series	Eleanor Campbell		
2005	Genesis of Aquarion	Reika	TV series	
2005	Glass Mask	Maya Kitajima		
2005	Loveless	Nagisa-sensei		
2005–2006	Tsubasa: Reservoir Chronicle series	Xing Huo		
2005	The Snow Queen	Karen		
2005	Magical Girl Lyrical Nanoha A's	Reinforce		
2005	My-Otome	Akira Okuzaki		
2006	Hanbun no Tsuki ga Noboru Sora	Misako Yosano		
2006	Ergo Proxy	Daedalus Yumeno, Dorothy		
2006	.hack//Roots	Ender, Pi		
2006–2007	Spider Riders series	Venus, Akune		
2006	The Third	Paifu		
2006	Fushigiboshi no Futagohime Gyu!	Elizabetta		
2006	Welcome to the NHK	Hitomi Kashiwa		
2006–2007	Demon Prince Enma	Lily Benton	OVA series	
2006	Save Me! Lollipop	Salia		
2006	Shōnen Onmyōji	Akiko Fujiwara		
2006–2008	D.Gray-Man	Allen Walker	Changed to Ayumu Murase in the 2016 sequel	
2006	Hell Girl: Two Mirrors	Kiwako Nitta		
2006	Crayon Shin-chan	Lisa Aspirin		
2006	Otoboku: Maidens Are Falling For Me!	Kaede Orikura		
2007	Nodame Cantabile	Kiyora Miki		
2007	El Cazador de la Bruja	Natalia		
2007	Tōka Gettan	Lilith		
2007	Sakura Wars: New York NY	Gemini Sunrise	OAV series	
2007–2009	Darker than Black series	Kanami Ishizaki		
2007	Toward the Terra	Fishisu, Letitia	2007 TV series	
2007	Wangan Midnight	Rumi Shimada		
2007	Baccano!	Ennis		
2007	Bamboo Blade	Carrie Nishikawa		
2007	Neuro: Supernatural Detective	Setsuna Honjo		
2007–2011	Shakugan no Shana	Mare		
2007	Rental Magica	Sakuyoru Ishido		
2007	Genshiken Pt. 2	Kitagawa		
2008	Dazzle	Rahzel Andis / Rahzenshia Rose		
2008	Persona: Trinity Soul	Eiko Nikaido, Shin Kanzato (young)		
2008	Yatterman	Yan Yan, Bakeru		
2008	Macross Frontier	Catherine Glass		
2008	Neo Angelique Abyss	Rouki		
2008	Our Home's Fox Deity	Hisui Mame		
2008	Zettai Karen Children	Patty Crew		
2008	Scarecrowman: The Animation	Beabea		
2008–2017	Natsume's Book of Friends series	Reiko Natsume, Schoolgirl Nyanko-sensei		
2008	Noramimi 2	Kenbo		
2008	Hell Girl: Three Wheels	Miwa Niiyama		
2008–2012	Inazuma Eleven series	Natsumi Raimon, Saku Kabeyama, Rimu Nanakaze, Rebun Sorano, Noriko Takoya, Atsuya Fubuki (young), Ruru Kui, Haru Ikemiyagi, Guel		
2008	Negibōzu no Asatarō	あんずのおみよ		
2009	The Beast Player Erin	Ian (boy)		
2009	Rideback	Kei Yoda		
2009	Element Hunters	Ally Connolly		
2009	Queen's Blade 2: The Evil Eye	Maria		
2010–2016	Durarara!! series	Namie Yagiri		
2010	Nodame Cantabile: Finale	Kiyora Miki		
2010	HeartCatch PreCure!	Theater staff		
2010	Maid Sama!	Nagisa Hyoudou		
2011	Inazuma Eleven GO	Natsumi Endo		
2012	Aquarion Evol	Suomi Konepi		
2012	Lupin the Third: The Woman Called Fujiko Mine	Aisha		
2012	Accel World	Noumi Seiji		
2012	Chōyaku Hyakunin isshu: Uta Koi	Hiroko		
2012	From the New World	Okano		
2012	The World God Only Knows: Tenri-Hen	Young Keima		
2013	Unlimited Psychic Squad	Patty Crew		
2013	Karneval	Mine		
2013	Strike the Blood	Mimori Akatsuki		
2014	Hamatora	Ratio (young)		
2014	World Conquest Zvezda Plot	Tsubaki Shikabane		
2014	The Kawai Complex Guide to Manors and Hostel Behavior	Sumiko		
2014	Captain Earth	Mao Marimura		
2014	Sailor Moon Crystal	Naru's mother	ONA	
2014	Monthly Girls' Nozaki-kun	Cathy		
2014	Akatsuki no Yona: Yona of the Dawn	Seiryu (child)		
2014	HappinessCharge PreCure!	Maria Hikawa/Cure Tender		
2015	Fafner in the Azure: Exodus	Canon Hazama		
2015	Re-Kan!	Insurance doctor		
2015	Master of Torque		ONA	
2015	Sōsei no Aquarion Love	Lihua	OVA	
2016	Yu-Gi-Oh! Arc-V	Asuka Tenjoin		
2016	JoJo's Bizarre Adventure: Diamond Is Unbreakable	High School Girl	Ep. 82	
2018	Inazuma Eleven: Ares	Rebun Sorano		
2018–2019	Inazuma Eleven: Orion no Kokuin	Natsumi Raimon		
2018–2020	Sword Art Online: Alicization	Rinko Koujiro		
2021	Cestvs: The Roman Fighter	Roxanne		
2022	Thermae Romae Novae	Livia	ONA	
2022	Shin Ikki Tousen	Shikei Roshuku		
2022	Tomica Heroes Jobraver: Tokusō Gattai Robo	Jobroids, Commanding Officer	ONA	
2023	Ōoku: The Inner Chambers	Tokugawa Yoshimune	ONA	
2024	Pokémon Horizons: The Series	Omodaka		
2024	Tonbo!	Shima-san	Season 2	
2025	My Status as an Assassin Obviously Exceeds the Hero's	Yoru		

=== Film ===
List of voice performances in feature films
Year	Title	Role	Notes	Source
2001	Inochi No Chikyuu: Dioxin No Natsu			
2004	Steamboy	Emma		
2004	Blade of the Phantom Master	Sando Yamamichi		
2007	Highlander: The Search for Vengeance	Deborah		
2008	Gekijo ban Gegege no Kitaro: Nippon bakuretsu	Hana		
2009	Macross Frontier: Itsuwari no Utahime	Catherine Glass		
2010	Inazuma Eleven: Saikyō Gundan Ōga Shūrai	Natsumi Raimon		
2010	Fafner in the Azure: Heaven and Earth	Canon Memphis-Hazama		
2011	Macross Frontier: Sayonara no Tsubasa	Catherine Glass		
2012	Magical Girl Lyrical Nanoha 2nd A's	Reinforce		
2015	Hikawa Maru Monogatari	Kiyoko Sugata		
2016	Pokémon the Movie: Volcanion and the Mechanical Marvel	Flamel		
2017	Genocidal Organ	Lucia Shukuropova		
2018	Natsume's Book of Friends Movie	Reiko Natsume		

=== Drama CD ===
List of voice performances in audio recordings
Title	Role	Notes	Source
Adventures of Sinbad: 23rd adventure エイレーネーの瞳 シンドバッド23世の冒険	Marek	NHK FM radio	
Anime Store Manager B Cadet series	Nagomu Nitobe		
Cynthia the Mission	Kanae Takano		
GファンタジーコミックCDコレクション E's Vol.2「見えざる茨の咎人」	Asuka Tokugawa		
Hayate × Blade series	Kijimiya Otoha		
Lenten Rose レンテンローズ	Kaori Yusa		
Macross Frontier series	Catherine Glass		
Memories Off series			
Ōoku gokujō-on emaki 大奥 極上音絵巻	Oshin		
Rozen Maiden	Jun Sakurada		
Sakura Wars series			
Shōnen Onmyōji: Kazane arc	Akiko Fujiwara		
Strawberry 100% series	Satsuki Kitaoji		

=== Video games ===
List of voice performances in video games
Year	Title	Role	Notes	Source
2001	Shenmue II	Additional Cast		
2001	Super Smash Bros. Melee	Popo, Nana		
2001	Growlanser III: The Dual Darkness	Princess Theodora	PS1/PS2	
2002	Subete ga F ni Naru	Sonomoe Nishino	PS1/PS2	
2002	Hikaru no Go: Heian Genso Ibun-roku	Akira Kamo	PS1/PS2	
2002	Nijiiro Dodge Ball: Otome Tachi no Seishun	Kazehana Hayami, Eren Atsukotto	PS1/PS2	
2002	Hikaru no Go: Insei Chojo Kessen	Akira Toya	PS1/PS2	
2002	Zoids Saga	Yuro Era		
2003	My Merry Maybe	Kagami Minakami		
2003	Fantastic Fortune 2	Aqua	Also Triple Star	
2003	ZOIDS VS. II	Yuno		
2003	Wild Arms Alter Code: F	Cecilia Lynn Adlehyde	PS1/PS2	
2003	All-Star Pro Wrestling III	Aoi Hinata	PS1/PS2	
2004	Flame of Recca: Final Burning	Renka, Kurumi	PS1/PS2	
2004	Memories Off: Sorekara	Inori Misasagi		
2004	Yami to Bōshi to Hon no Tabibito: Taiping Torabera	Lilith	PC	
2004	Sakura Taisen V Episode 0 ~Kouya no Samurai Musume	Gemini Sunrise	PS1/PS2	
2004	ZOIDS VS. III	Yuno		
2004	Shounen Onmyouji	Akiko Fujiwara		
2005	Radiata Stories	Ridley Timberlake	PS1/PS2	
2005	Strawberry 100%: Strawberry Diary	Satsuki Kitaoji	PS1/PS2	
2005	Angelic Vale Ephemeral	Alondra	PC	
2005	My Merry May with be	Kagami Minakami	PS1/PS2	
2005	Sakura Wars: So Long, My Love	Gemini Sunrise		
2005	Duel Savior Destiny	Lily Sheffield	PS1/PS2	
2006	Onimusha: Dawn of Dreams	Ohatsu	PS1/PS2	
2006	Mai-Hime Bakuretsu! Fuuka Gakuen Gekitoushi?!	Akira Okuzaki	PSP	
2006	Memories Off: Sorekara Again	Inori Misasagi	PS1/PS2	
2006	Metal Wolf REV	Hihasu Asagiri	PS1/PS2	
2006	Shakugan no Shana	Mare	PS1/PS2	
2006	Mai-Hime Senretsu! Shin Fuuka Gakuen Gekitoushi!!	Akira Okuzaki	PSP	
2006	.hack//G.U. Vol. 1: Rebirth	Pai	PS1/PS2	
2006	Mega Man ZX	Vent & Aile	DS	
2006	Wrestle Angels: Survivor	Akiko Saito, Lucky Uchida	PS1/PS2	
2006	Yu-Gi-Oh! Duel Monsters GX: Tag Force	Asuka Tenjoin	PSP	
2006	.hack//G.U. Vol 2: Reminisce	Pai	PS1/PS2	
2006	Summon Night 4	Lucien Bronx	PS1/PS2	
2007	D.Gray-man: Kami no Shitotachi	Allen Walker	DS	
2007	Nodame Cantabile	Kiyora Miki	PS1/PS2	
2007	Mega Man ZX Advent	Aile	DS	
2007	Shounen Onmyouji: Tsubasa Yoima, Ten e Kaere	Akiko Fujiwara	PS1/PS2	
2007	Yu-Gi-Oh! Duel Monsters GX: Tag Force 2	Asuka Tenjoin	PSP	
2007	Star Ocean: First Departure	Ilya Silvestri	PSP	
2008	Trauma Center: New Blood	Leslie Newman	Wii	
2008	Super Smash Bros. Brawl	Popo, Nana		
2008	Soulcalibur IV	Seong Mi-na	PS3	
2008	Inazuma Eleven	Natsumi Raimon		
2008	D.Gray-man: Sousha no Shikaku	Allen Walker	PS1/PS2	
2008	Wrestle Angels: Survivor 2	Akiko Saito, Lucky Uchida	PS1/PS2	
2008	Yu-Gi-Oh! Duel Monsters GX: Tag Force 3	Asuka Tenjoin	PSP	
2009	Inazuma Eleven 2	Natsumi Raimon	DS	
2009	Macross Ultimate Frontier	Sarah Nome	PSP	
2010	Mahou Shoujo Lyrical Nanoha A's Portable: The Battle of Aces	Reinforce	PSP	
2010	.hack//Link	Pai		
2010	Inazuma Eleven 3	Natsumi Raimon	DS	
2010	Another Century's Episode: R	Koreika, Sara Nome, Catherine Glass	PS3	
2010	Durarara!! 3way standoff	Namie Yakiri	PSP	
2010	Kana: Little Sister	Kana Todo	PSP	
2011	Macross Triangle Frontier	Sarah Nome, Catherine Glass	PSP	
2011	Atelier Meruru: The Apprentice of Arland	Hanna Olses	PS3	
2011	Inazuma Eleven Strikers	Natsumi Raimon, Quill, Rihm, Guel, Tsukushi Ootani	Wii	
2011	Code 18	Yuzu Soraki		
2011	Inazuma Eleven GO	Natsumi Raimon	3DS	
2012	Armored Core V	Furan		
2012	Gravity Rush	Kat	PSVita	
2012	Conception: Ore no Kodomo o Undekure!	Mirei	PSP	
2012	Rune Factory 4	Forte	3DS	
2012	Accel World Stage:01 Silver Star Awakening	Seiji Nomi		
2012	Project X Zone	Gemini Sunrise	3DS	
2012	Diamond Alice: Wonderful Wonder World	Christa Snow Pigeon	PSP	
2013	PlayStation All-Stars Battle Royale	Kat	From Gravity Rush	
2013	Atelier Meruru Plus: The Apprentice of Arland	Hanna Olses		
2013	Super Robot Wars Operation Extend	Catherine Glass	PSP	
2013	Diamond Alice: Wonderful Mirror World	Christa Snow Pigeon	PSP	
2014	J-Stars Victory VS	Allen Walker		
2015	Project X Zone 2	Gemini Sunrise	3DS	
2016	Breath of Fire 6	Wilhelm	PC/Mobile	
2016	Gravity Rush Remastered	Kat	PS4	
2017	Gravity Rush 2	Kat	PS4	
2018	Super Smash Bros. Ultimate	Popo, Nana	Nintendo Switch	
2021	Arknights	Saga	Mobile	
2021	Honkai Impact 3rd	Raven	PC/Mobile	
2022	Genshin Impact	Tighnari	PS/PC/Mobile	
2022	Goddess of Victory: Nikke	Sakura	PC/Mobile	
2025	Inazuma Eleven: Victory Road	Sei Soramiya		

=== Dubbing ===
==== Live-action ====
Title	Role	Notes	Source
127 Hours	Rana (Clémence Poésy)		
Ad Astra	Eve (Liv Tyler)		
Armageddon	Grace Stamper (Liv Tyler)	2004 NTV edition	
Arrow	Laurel Lance (Katie Cassidy)		
Assassination	Ahn Okyun / Mitsuko (Jun Ji-hyun)		
Back to the Future	Lorraine Baines-McFly (Lea Thompson)	2014 BS Japan edition	
Belly of the Beast	Jessica Hopper (Sara Malakul Lane)		
Big Mommas: Like Father, Like Son	Haley Robinson (Jessica Lucas)		
Black Snake Moan	Rae Doole (Christina Ricci)		
Blade Runner 2049	Joi (Ana de Armas)		
Bounce	Janice Guerrero (Jennifer Grey)		
Bring It On	Whitney (Nicole Bilderback)		
Charlie Countryman	Gabriella "Gabi" Ibanescu (Evan Rachel Wood)		
A Cinderella Story	Samantha "Sam" Montgomery (Hilary Duff)		
The Claim	Hope Dillon / Burn (Sarah Polley)		
Coco Before Chanel	Coco Chanel (Audrey Tautou)		
The Devil Wears Prada	Andrea "Andy" Sachs (Anne Hathaway)	2010 NTV edition	
Extraction 2	Mia (Olga Kurylenko)		
Farewell, My Queen	Sidonie Laborde (Léa Seydoux)		
Final Destination 2	Kimberly Corman (A. J. Cook)		
First Reformed	Mary Mensana (Amanda Seyfried)		
Flightplan	Fiona (Erika Christensen)		
The Forbidden Kingdom	Golden Sparrow (Liu Yifei)		
The Four III	Sheng Yayu (Liu Yifei)		
Getaway	The Kid (Selena Gomez)		
The Gray Man	Dani Miranda (Ana de Armas)		
Hairspray	Amber Von Tussle (Brittany Snow)		
Henry Poole Is Here	Patience		
I Love You, Man	Zooey Rice (Rashida Jones)		
Iceman: The Time Traveller	May (Huang Shengyi)		
Journey to the Center of the Earth	Hannah Ásgeirsson (Anita Briem)	2010 TV Asahi edition	
Knives Out	Marta Cabrera (Ana de Armas)		
The Legend of Zu	Joy (Zhang Ziyi)		
The Matrix Revolutions	Sutti		
The Monkey King 3	The Ruler of Women's Country (Zhao Liying)		
Mothers and Daughters	Rebecca (Christina Ricci)		
Murder by Numbers	Lisa Mills (Agnes Bruckner)		
My Sassy Girl	The Girl (Jun Ji-hyun)		
A Nightmare on Elm Street	Kris Fowles (Katie Cassidy)		
Nick & Norah's Infinite Playlist	Norah Silverberg (Kat Dennings)		
No Country for Old Men	Carla Jean Moss (Kelly Macdonald)		
North Face	Luise Fellner (Johanna Wokalek)	2020 BS Tokyo edition	
The O.C.	Marissa Cooper (Mischa Barton)		
Once Upon a Time	Mary Margaret Blanchard (Ginnifer Goodwin)		
Oz the Great and Powerful	Theodora (Mila Kunis)		
Pitch Perfect 2	Beca Mitchell (Anna Kendrick)		
Police Story	May (Maggie Cheung)	2012 Ultimate Blu-Ray edition	
Police Story 2	May (Maggie Cheung)	2010 Blu-Ray edition	
Project A Part II	Yesan (Maggie Cheung)		
Rogue	Kate Ryan (Radha Mitchell)		
Rush Hour 2	Hu Li (Zhang Ziyi)		
Scorpion	Paige Dineen (Katharine McPhee)		
Side Effects	Emily Taylor (Rooney Mara)		
Sin City	Nancy Callahan (Jessica Alba)		
Sin City: A Dame to Kill For	Nancy Callahan (Jessica Alba)		
Smash	Karen Cartwright (Katharine McPhee)		
Song to Song	Faye (Rooney Mara)		
The Sorcerer and the White Snake	White Snake / Susu (Huang Shengyi)		
The Third Way of Love	Zou Yu (Liu Yifei)		
Transformers: Dark of the Moon	Carly Spencer (Rosie Huntington-Whiteley)		
Trash	Sister Olivia (Rooney Mara)		
The Voices	Lisa (Anna Kendrick)		
Walk Hard: The Dewey Cox Story	Darlene Madison Cox (Jenna Fischer)		
Wu Kong	Ah Zi (Ni Ni)		
X2: X-Men United	Artie Maddicks		
You Don't Mess with the Zohan	Dalia Hakbarah (Emmanuelle Chriqui)		

==== Animation ====
Title	Role	Notes	Source
Charlotte's Web	Fern Arable	2006 DVD edition	
My Little Pony: The Movie	Tempest Shadow		
Planes	Ishani		
