= PlayStation All-Stars Island =

2013 video game

- Developer: Zoink
- Publisher: Sony Computer Entertainment
- Platforms: iOS, Android
- Release: EU: 8 August 2013
- Genres: Kart racing, Platform, Rail shooter, endless runner
- Modes: Single-player, multiplayer

PlayStation All-Stars Island is a free-to-play crossover video game developed by Zoink and published by Sony Computer Entertainment for iOS and Android. It features characters from various PlayStation franchises. The game was sponsored by Coke Zero. The game was announced, and released on August 8, 2013 in selected European territories; no North American release is planned.

== Gameplay ==
The game consists of four different game modes, each featuring a different character from a respective Sony Computer Entertainment video game franchise. This includes Nathan Drake from Uncharted, Sackboy from LittleBigPlanet, Cole MacGrath from Infamous and Kat from Gravity Rush. The four mini-games all loosely play as endless runners, though each have separate elements from their respective series as well; Nathan Drake runs through ancient ruins, Sack Boy races through levels similarly to LittleBigPlanet Karting and Kat retains her ability to shift gravity.

Within the games, the player must direct the respective character through the game's levels, avoiding obstacles and collecting Coke-themed items. The collection of items unlocks further content, challenges and even cameos from other PlayStation series such as Ratchet & Clank, Jak and Daxter and Sackgirl. Additional game content may be downloaded by scanning QR codes on actual Coke Zero bottles.

== Development ==
The game was announced on 8 August 2013, as a mobile phone game for iOS and Android platforms, developed by Zoink and being sponsored by Coke Zero. It was made available for download for its respective platforms on the same day as its announcement. The game was released in select European territories; Sony has announced there are no plans for the game to be released in North America.

== Reception ==
The game has been compared unfavorably to Halo 4: King of the Hill Refueled by Mountain Dew as an example of excessive and blatant advertising in a video game. The Escapist criticized the advertising as being "obnoxious", complaining of an unfavorable Coke-to-Sony representation in the game, with there being more Coke ads than Sony characters.

== See also ==
- PlayStation All-Stars Battle Royale, a 2012 fighting game that combines PlayStation-related characters in a similar manner
