= Hikawa Maru Monogatari =

2015 Japanese animated film by Shunji Ōga

- Theatrical release poster
- Kanji: 氷川丸ものがたり
- Directed by: Shunji Ōga
- Screenplay by: Ryōichi Matsushita; Kōji Miura
- Based on: Hikawa Maru Monogatari by Genjiro Ito
- Produced by: Keiko Hatta; Aiko Tanaka
- Starring: Chihiro Kusaka; Keisuke Kōmoto
- Narrated by: Keiko Toda
- Cinematography: Kenji Takehara
- Edited by: Yumiko Nakaba
- Music by: Kōsuke Yamashita
- Production company: Mushi Production
- Distributed by: Kansai Produce Center
- Release dates: July 24, 2015 (Shinjuku); August 22, 2015 (Japan)
- Running time: 90 minutes
- Country: Japan
- Language: Japanese
- Budget: ¥150 million

Hikawa Maru Monogatari (Japanese: 氷川丸ものがたり; lit. 'Hikawa Maru Story') is a 2015 Japanese animated film based on the book of the same name by Genjiro Ito. Produced by Mushi Production and distributed by Kansai Produce Center, the film is directed by Shunji Ōga from a script written by Ryōichi Matsushita and Kōji Miura. It follows the history of the Japanese ocean liner Hikawa Maru in the eyes of Jirō Hirayama.

The film began its production in April 2014 and the staff working on it were announced in May 2015. The dubbing was completed in June 2015, with Chihiro Kusaka and Keisuke Kōmoto confirming their voice role as Jirō. The film was completed the following month.

Hikawa Maru Monogatari premiered in Shinjuku on July 24, 2015, and was released in Japan on August 22.

== Synopsis ==
The film depicts four different time periods of Hikawa Maru's history in the eyes of Jirō Hirayama. Jirō, who had lost his mother in the Great Kanto earthquake, is helping his father Genzō run soba stall and desires to board the ocean liner. In May 1930, he witnesses the departure of the ship from the Port of Yokohama on its maiden voyage to Seattle, United States. With the help of captain Hachirō Akinaga and officer Akinobu Matsuda, who both become his customers in the stall, Jirō joins the crew as an apprentice cook. In 1941, Hikawa Maru is converted into a hospital ship by the Imperial Japanese Navy. Meanwhile, Jirō gets drafted. He later reunites with the ship along with other injured soldiers. After the war ended, the ship helps in the repatriation of Japanese soldiers and citizens. After that, Jirō and the crew begin accepting passengers and serve them on board as Hikawa Maru becomes a cargo-passenger ship and returns to its North American route.

== Voice cast ==
- Keiko Toda as Narrator
- Chihiro Kusaka as Jirō Hirayama (13–16 years old)
- Keisuke Kōmoto as Jirō Hirayama (24 years old and above)
- Masahiro Yamanaka as Hiroshi Yamanaka
- Takayuki Sasada as Sadao Inagaki (deckhand)
- Kiyohiro Yamaguchi as Seiichi Morimoto (nurse)
- Sanae Kobayashi as Kiyoko Sugata
- Takuya Kirimoto as Genzō Hirayama
- Nayu Kazetani as Mitsue Hirayama
- Jiro Saito as Tetsuzō Ōkubo
- Jin Yamanoi as Hachirō Akinaga
- Naomi Kusumi as Shigeo Kakamigahara
- Masashi Nogawa as Akinobu Matsuda
- Yūko Sanpei as Hikaru Kasuga
- Kenta Sasa as Chūji Ishii
- Tomotaka Hachisuka as Head steward
- Kōsuke Echigoya as Kasuga
- Tomoki Atsuta as Deckhand A
- Hiroyuki Honda as Cook A
- Hayato Horiuchi as Kudō (cook)
- Mari Hino as Jirō Hirayama (3 years old, flashback)
- Arōta Nonogaki as Chūdō
- Masatsugu Saitō as Utsumi
- Yūhana Maruyama as Nurse
- Ryan Drees as Radio broadcaster
- Norio Kanaya as Captain Shiromoto

== Production ==
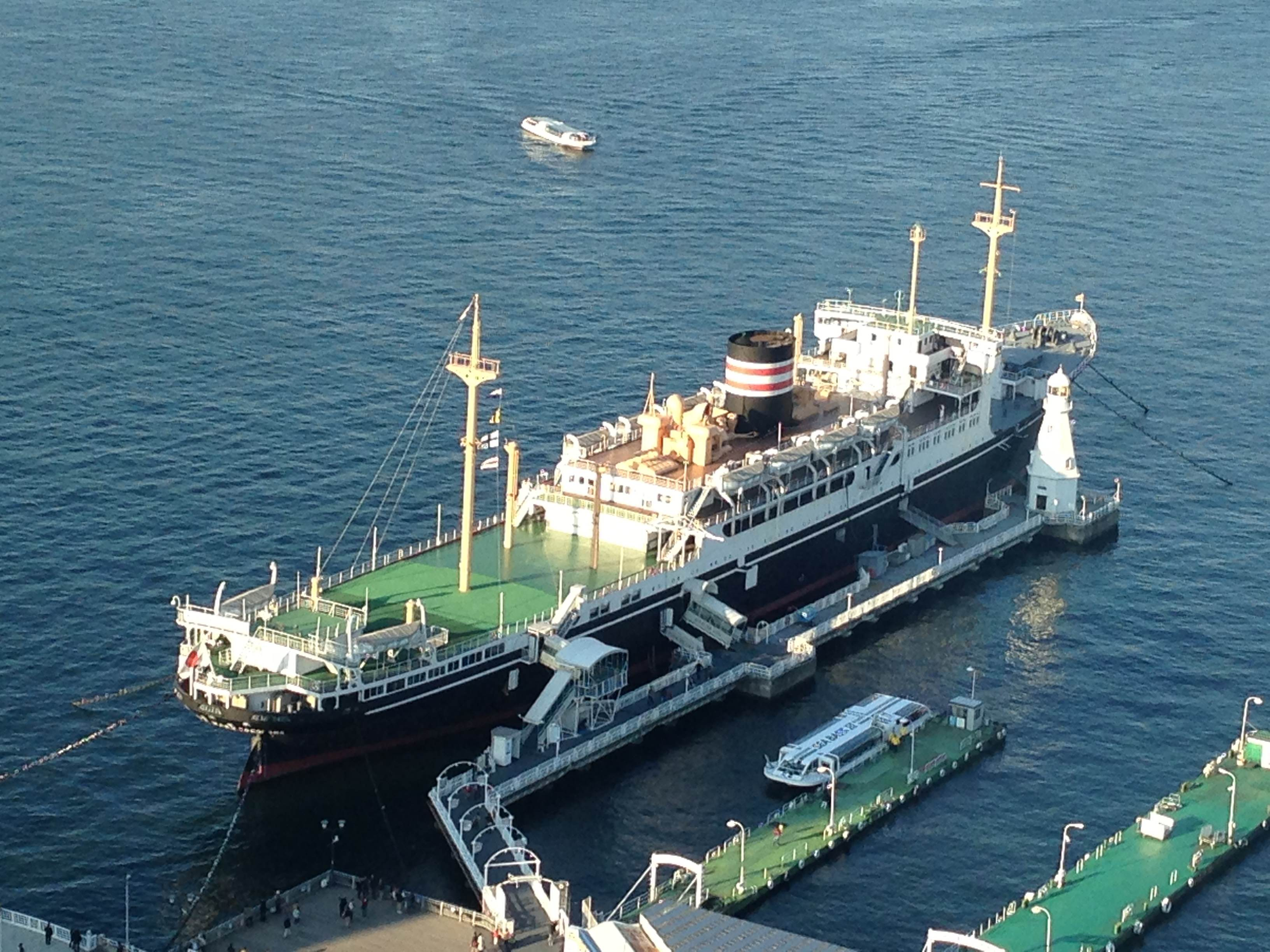
Hikawa Maru viewed from Yokohama Marine Tower

Development on Hikawa Maru Monogatari began in April 2014. In December 2014, the scenario for the film was drafted. Storyboarding began in March 2015. The basis for the 3DCG of the Japanese ocean liner Hikawa Maru was the ship's model located at NYK Maritime Museum in Yokohama, which began in May 2015. The museum and the All-Japan Seamen's Union helped in historical research. That month, the staff working on the film at Mushi Production were revealed, including Shunji Ōga as the director, Ryōichi Matsushita and Kōji Miura as scriptwriters, Kenji Takehara as the director of photography, and Yumiko Nakaba as the editor. The book that the film was based on, written by Genjiro Ito, was published by Kamakura Shunjusha on June 5, 2015. The dubbing was completed by late June 2015, with Keiko Toda doing the narration, and Chihiro Kusaka and Keisuke Kōmoto voicing the main character Jirō Hirayama. Captain Norio Kanaya, the 28th captain of the ship, would be voicing Captain Shiromoto. The film was completed in July 2015. It would be distributed by Kansai Produce Center.

== Music ==
Reijiro Koroku was first attached to Hikawa Maru Monogatari as its composer in May 2015. However, in June 2015, he was replaced by Kōsuke Yamashita. That month, the theme song for the film was titled "Kanata" (彼方; lit. 'Beyond') by Kazumasa Oda. The song was included in Oda's album Oda Biyori (小田日和), which was released on July 2, 2014, and was first used in a commercial for the Japan Racing Association.

== Marketing ==
In August 2015, Japan Post Holdings released a limited edition frame postage stamp set based on Hikawa Maru Monogatari. That month, a trailer for the film was released.

== Release ==
Hikawa Maru Monogatari had a VIP screening at Meiji Yasuda Life Hall in Shinjuku, Tokyo on July 24, 2015, and was released in Japan on August 22. That year marked the 85th anniversary of the ship's maiden voyage. Mushi Production planned to screen the film in community centers, schools, and overseas beyond October 2015 for the next three years, with the goal to reach one million viewers. The film had its international premiere at the Asian Film Festival of Dallas in July 2016.

== Reception ==
Nick Askam gave Hikawa Maru Monogatari a score of 7 out of 10 for Selig Film News, feeling that the film was "better than average and I'll try my hardest to see it again". Askam praised the relationship between the characters, particularly of Jirō with his father, a child from his hometown, and the actual Hikawa Maru itself. As for the animation, he described it as "fantastic" and felt that it looked "hyper-realistic". However, Askam felt the film should feature non-fictional characters whom he could get behind, stating that it was "just something that takes me out of it and makes me focus on the time period"; this was also the same issue he had with the film Beasts of No Nation.
