= List of Nodame Cantabile characters =

Nodame Cantabile (Japanese: のだめカンタービレ, Hepburn: Nodame Kantābire) is a manga series written and illustrated by Tomoko Ninomiya, and has been serialized by Kodansha in the josei (aimed at younger adult women) manga magazine Kiss since 2001 and collected in 23 tankōbon volumes as of August 2009. The series is a best-seller in Japan, having sold more than 18 million copies as of February 2007, with new volumes regularly entering the best-seller lists. It received the 2004 Kodansha Manga Award for best shōjo manga.

The series has been adapted as two separate television series. First, a live-action television was broadcast in 11 episodes on Fuji TV between 16 October and 25 December 2006, followed by a two-episode sequel series in January 2008. Two live-action movies, continuing the television drama with the same actors, have been announced with an anticipated release in 2010. Second, an anime series was adapted by J.C.Staff, also produced and broadcast by Fuji TV in two seasons. The first season was broadcast in 24 episodes from 11 January to 28 June 2007, and the second season began on 8 October 2008 with broadcasts ongoing. A third season has been announced to be broadcast in the fall of 2009.

Nodame Cantabile centres around aspiring conductor Shinichi Chiaki and Megumi Noda, an extremely talented pianist. As students at the Momogaoka College of Music in Japan, they have many friends with their own musical ambitions, in particular Ryutaro Mine and Masumi Okuyama, and teachers like conductor Franz von Stresemann and piano instructor Kouzou Etoh to guide them. Early on, the series focuses on the S-Orchestra, a group of maverick students chosen specifically by Stresemann, who leaves them to be conducted by Chiaki. Several notable members go on to join the Rising Star Orchestra (R☆S Orchestra) partially founded and also conducted by Chiaki; the formation of the new orchestra introduces several new colleagues for Chiaki, including violinist Kiyora Miki and oboe player Yasunori Kuroki. When Chiaki and Nodame move to Paris to launch Chiaki's career as a professional conductor and for Nodame to continue her studies as a pianist, they find new friends and rivals, as well as remain in contact with their friends from Japan. Along with the Conservatoire students, Tanya, Franck, and Yunlong, who share the same boarding house as Nodame and Chiaki, they meet famed musicians, like Son Rui, and conductor Jean Donnedieu.

== Main characters ==
Megumi Noda (野田 恵, Noda Megumi)
Also known as Nodame (のだめ), which is a portmanteau of her family name and the first phoneme of her given name. Born in Okawa City, Fukuoka Prefecture. Noda is, at the start of the series, a twenty-year-old free-spirited second-year music student. She is depicted as a complete slob: her cooking and cleaning skills are atrocious to the point of having mushrooms growing on her clothes and poisoning anyone who dares to eat her food (yet she's never been poisoned). However, she is an incredibly talented pianist who primarily plays by ear, in a cantabile style.
In love with Chiaki, she follows him around constantly, claiming to be his "wife," and leans on him to help her get through sticky situations. She sometimes compulsively needs to play the piano, neglecting everything in order to do it. As well as that, she seems to enjoy childish manga and movies. She is constantly hungry, and is fed dinners by Chiaki; she also steals many lunches from her fellow friend, Maki. Nodame has a tendency to speak cryptically (sometimes she doesn't even understand herself), often refers to herself in the third person, and uses nonsense words like mukya and gyabo.
Nodame is initially very dependent on Chiaki in terms of ambition - she has little intention of becoming a professional pianist, despite her remarkable talent, and wants to become a kindergarten teacher, though many feel she is too reckless and lacks the appropriate sensibility to be responsible with teaching children.
Her piano style is considered to be completely haphazard, diverting from original intent at both dynamics, rhythms and even themes. Realizing that her current attitude towards music will eventually drive her apart from Chiaki, Nodame gradually develops the necessary drive to pursue music for her own sake. Her attitude towards music is largely due to an incident in the past where she was hurt by a teacher who demanded her to play music "as it's written". Despite this, several people have commented on how captivating her piano is, and how she is able to draw rich, expressive notes from the piano.
Eventually, she goes with Chiaki to France for further education in music. Due to her carefree attitude towards music previously, she struggles to keep up with the rest of the class in terms of in-depth knowledge and techniques, but manages to overcome the trials laid before her and begins to "truly" appreciate music. Near the end of the series, she performed with Stresemann on stage (he was attempting to pull her out of an emotional slump), and was an instant world-wide hit.
During their stay in France, Chiaki and Nodame become a couple, with Chiaki once stating that "he got tired of fighting her".
Nodame's character is based on a real-life counterpart with same name. Juri Ueno received Best Actress awards for her depiction of Megumi Noda at the 2007 Japanese Drama Academy Awards and the 2008 International Drama Festival in Tokyo.
Voiced by: Ayako Kawasumi (Japanese); Kate Higgins (English) Live action actor: Juri Ueno
Shinichi Chiaki (千秋 真一, Chiaki Shin'ichi)
Born in France, raised in Kanagawa Prefecture. Chiaki is twenty-one years old and a 3rd-year piano student at Momogaoka Music Academy at the start of the series. He is an accomplished pianist and violinist, but is also known to be a perfectionist when it comes to music and is highly critical of himself and others. As he opens up to others (with much prodding from Nodame), he becomes more caring of his friends and readily lends a hand to his friends should they need help. In university, he was extremely popular among the female students due to his good looks and musical ability.
He comes from a distinguished and well-off family, and is an excellent cook (although he mostly cooks Western-style food, possibly because he spent much of his childhood in Europe). He seems to think that most "poor" people (such as Sakura Saku) are like the little match girl. While he dreams of studying abroad and becoming a famous conductor like his mentor, Sebastiano Viera, he must overcome his fear of flying and the sea to do so (he finally did with help of Nodame's hypnosis). His fears come from traumatic incidents in the past, one when he survived an airplane crash landing, the other because he was almost drowned. His family once attempted to drug him and bring him on board a plane, but the plane had to turn back due to difficulties.
He is dismayed to discover that this freakish but talented girl, Nodame, lives in the apartment next door to him. However, he develops a sort of empathy with Nodame as he discovers her hidden potential to be a great pianist, and he begins to transcend his perfectionism and begins to enjoy his music and the music of others. Despite his constant irritation towards Nodame, he eventually develops romantic feelings toward her and he chooses to find work as a conductor in Paris, where she is going to study. As Chiaki realizes his life's ambition to become a conductor, he also finds that he needs Nodame's support and he cannot move on without her. He also appears to have fear of being abandoned and surpassed, the former comes from being abandoned by his father as a young boy. Afraid of being abandoned, he often abandons other people instead, especially Nodame. In various instances, he's also shown to have reservation over being "too friendly" with others, (mentioned in a rehearsal with RS orchestra). He's constantly afraid of being surpassed by Nodame, trying to go ever ahead, which leaves her miserable as she is trying to catch up to him. He also can be considered as insensitive.
He is one of the major factors in Nodame's progress in music, occasionally taking the time to extensively coach her during critical periods. In turn, he too is influenced and inspired strongly by her music.
During university, he became the student/apprentice of Stresemann, and while Chiaki is constantly irritated by Stresemann's numerous vices (visiting nightclubs frequently, chasing women, drinking, etc), he respects his teacher's music and ability in conducting. This relationship sees a continuation when they move to France, where Chiaki is coerced by Stresemann's manager Elise into signing a contract with their agency.
As the series progresses, he actually starts to develop feelings for Nodame, especially while they are in France. Despite his popularity among women, he is somewhat surprisingly devoted, and once their relationship solidifies is never seen to be unfaithful to her, once explicitly declining Rui's invitation for a date and stating that he was going to meet up with Nodame. However, they do go through the occasional rough patch, partially because they spend large amounts of time apart (as a conductor and Stresemann's student, Chiaki travels all over Europe), and both Chiaki and Nodame are prone to bouts of insecurity.
At the end of series, he is slowly advancing his career as a conductor, with an orchestra that has a long history but had since fallen on tough times. He successfully remakes the orchestra's declining image little by little.
Voiced by: Tomokazu Seki (Japanese); Doug Erholtz (English) Live action actor: Hiroshi Tamaki

== Supporting characters ==
Maestro Franz von Stresemann (フランツ·フォン·シュトレーゼマン, Furantsu Fon Shutorēzeman)
Stresemann is an elderly, highly respected internationally famous conductor who comes to Momogaoka Music Academy as a guest instructor. In love with the Academy's Director, he comes as a favor and immediately is pegged as an oddball lecher. Perverted, demanding, and not at all dignified, Stresemann seems to be opposite of what his reputation makes him.
Stresemann, however, immediately takes to Nodame, and even accepts Chiaki as his one and only apprentice after repeatedly rejecting his application to enroll in his conducting classes. His wild behavior constantly gets Chiaki in trouble, but he also teaches him how to feel and express music in a way that only he can. He often takes his orchestra out for mixers or group dates, and go to night clubs and host clubs (especially a place called One More Kiss) instead of attending the rehearsals he is supposed to conduct. He also gets drunk easily, forcing Chiaki to take over for him as vice-conductor.
Stresemann is eventually forcibly taken back to Europe to continue his professional life by his hardnosed assistant, Elise. He develops a fatherly-like affection towards both Nodame and Chiaki, and gives them advice and help along the way. He is also responsible for Nodame's sudden and sensational launch into the world of professional music; upon seeing her in an emotional slump, he decides to give her an opportunity to perform one piece at his upcoming concert.
He has an ongoing rivalry with Sebastian Veira (although this may just be in his own mind), and seems to be connected to Auclair as well (Nodame's teacher in France). Both do not seem to hold him in any high regard, possibly due to his frivolous attitude and notorious reputation for being a womanizer.
Nearing the end of the series, he is said to be beginning to lose hearing in one of his ears, although supposedly it did not have a great impact on his career yet. He also goes through depression whenever one of his friends from his own generation passes away, and whines about how he'll be next.
Voiced by: Shinji Ogawa (Japanese); Terrence Stone (English) Live action actor: Naoto Takenaka
Ryutaro Mine (峰 龍太郎, Mine Ryūtarō)
4th-year Violin student in Momogaoka. His father owns a Chinese restaurant "Uraken" right next to the university. He is something of a primadonna whose violin technique is seen by himself to be deeply personal but by others to be simply sloppy. He sees Chiaki as a rival for attention and tries hard to compete with his "Princely" image of him. He likes Nodame for her free-spirited ways. He is the concertmaster of the S Orchestra conducted by Chiaki, and a violinist in the R☆S Orchestra. He is also the one who thought that performing like Jimi Hendrix, and adding a touch of 'rock' would give quality despite that it looks dumb in an original orchestra (as stated by Chiaki). He has been dating Kiyora Miki.
Later on he becomes the manager for an opera/musical group which Chiaki occasionally conducts the orchestra for.
Voiced by: Shinji Kawada (Japanese); Grant George (English) Live action actor: Eita
Yasunori Kuroki (黒木 泰則, Kuroki Yasunori)
A talented oboe player who falls for Nodame at first sight (oblivious to her true nature, he sees her as pure, simplistic, and adorable) and performs the inaugural solo of the R☆S orchestra. Because he tends to be phlegmatic and quiet, many members of the R☆S orchestra think of him as "samurai-like". Though he is crushed and distracted after learning about Nodame's love for Chiaki, Kuroki becomes a good friend to both Nodame and Chiaki and goes on to study abroad in France with them.
Once there, he has much difficulty adjusting to the language, people, and culture, making it hard for him to socialize and make friends. His awkward and quiet demeanor earned him the scorn and nickname "Glauque" from Tanya (meaning dark and depressing, also means green/blue-ish). However they warm up to each other later. Kuroki later becomes a member of the Roux-Marlet Orchestra conducted by Chiaki.
As the series progresses, he and Tanya begin to get along. Tanya even plays piano accompaniment for him. By the end of Nodame Cantabile - Opera Hen, he has proposed to Tanya.
Voiced by: Masaya Matsukaze (Japanese); Joe Cappelletti (English) Live action actor: Seiji Fukushi
Kiyora Miki (三木 清良, Miki Kiyora)
A prodigious violinist Chiaki met at the Nina Lutz's seminar, she joins him to form the R☆S Orchestra as his concertmaster. She also becomes Mine's girlfriend. In all media, she had studied abroad in Vienna and had received private tutoring from the Berlin Philharmonics concertmaster, Kai Dowin. She also returns abroad a year after they started the R☆S Orchestra, after she is replaced as concertmaster of R☆S by Noriyuki Takahashi. In the live-action version, she was a student of Momogaoka and concertmaster of A Orchestra, where she became friends with Masumi.
Voiced by: Sanae Kobayashi (Japanese); Colleen O'Shaughnessey (English) Live action actor: Asami Mizukawa

== In Japan ==
Masumi Okuyama (奥山 真澄, Okuyama Masumi)
A claustrophobic 4th-year timpanist (percussion), who is an okama. He is homosexual. He developed a crush on Chiaki and always admired him from afar. He barely spoke to Chiaki until Nodame's arrival. Since Nodame starts to hang out with Chiaki, he considers her as a rival and often bullies her and anyone else who tries to get close to Chiaki. Despite his idiosyncrasies, he excels on his percussion skills, earning him the title of "Queen of Percussion" and a place in the S and R☆S orchestras conducted by Chiaki. He becomes a professional timpanist when he is hired by the New Metropolitan Philharmonic. Even so, he still makes time for R☆S activities.
He is one of Nodame's best friends. He credits Nodame for helping him become friends with Chiaki and helps to keep others away from Chiaki. They maintain contact throughout her stay in France.
Voiced by: Yoshinori Fujita (Japanese); Steve Staley (English) Live action actor: Keisuke Koide
Saiko Tagaya (多賀谷 彩子, Tagaya Saiko)
Chiaki's former girlfriend. Coming from a wealthy family, she majors in singing (more specifically opera). She is the "belle" of the school due to her looks and voice.
Despite breaking up with Chiaki, Saiko has been in love with him all along. She broke up with him because when it came to music, he was equally critical of everyone including her, and yet even though he was far more talented than everyone (and herself), he was the most critical of himself, and that made it hard being with him. After breaking up with Chiaki she goes through a few relationships, but because of her lingering attraction to Chiaki, is never able to fully put him behind her.
Later on, she comes to terms with the fact that Chiaki has moved on without her, and presumably moves on as well.
Saiko sometimes exhibits a spiteful streak in her, especially to those whom she views as rivals, but is also capable of gentleness. Once, when a drunken Nodame bumped into Saiko at a karaoke restroom, Saiko first smacks her away, then after realizing Nodame was drunk, gave Nodame her shawl before leaving.
Voiced by: Hitomi Nabatame (Japanese); Cindy Robinson (English) Live action actor: Misa Uehara
Sakura Saku (佐久 桜, Saku Sakura)
A double bass player in Chiaki's S orchestra, whose family was in financial trouble because her father's business was about to go bankrupt. A student of very short height, Sakura was mistaken as an elementary student when she first came into the orchestra, and as her instrument is much larger than she is, people usually do not see her when she is carrying it on her back, thinking it is moving by itself. Upon paying them a home visit, Chiaki and Nodame are shown her father's collection of rare and extremely expensive violins, even though he cannot play them. Chiaki promptly blows up and orders him to sell all of them.
She is later seen dating another cellist from the S-Orchestra. In the manga and anime, her role in the story ends with S-Orchestra; in the live-action drama, she remains a permanent character and becomes member of the R☆S Orchestra.
Voiced by: Mamiko Noto (Japanese); Karen Strassman (English) Live action actor: Saeko
Kouzo Etoh (江藤 耕造, Etō Kōzō)
A piano teacher also known as the "harisen teacher" (Paper Fan-sensei), because he always carries one during his class which uses to punish his students for their mistakes. He was Chiaki's teacher at the start of the story, but after Chiaki blew up at him for scoffing at his dream of being a conductor, Etoh threw Chiaki out of his class. This was one of the first setbacks Chiaki faced in the series, as Etoh was known in the school for tutoring only elite students.
One day he heard Nodame practicing and decided to become her teacher, going so far as to forcibly transfer Nodame to his class. The relationship does not start well, as his overbearing attitude and use of physical rebukes (he would smack his students with his paper fan) reminds Nodame of her piano tutor when she was young, and causes her to run away from him. He eventually gives up his harisen in order to convince Nodame to take lessons from him.
Nodame, in order to attend an upcoming competition, stayed at Etoh and his wife's place for training. He is not above tricking Nodame, using her love of Purigorota cartoon characters and free lunches, to convince her to perform or listen his advice. In contrast to Etoh's severity, his wife Kaori (かおり) is a light-hearted and loving woman who often takes care of the students who study with Etoh.
He was one of the first few to note Nodame's talent and train her, and notes that even past her superb technique and musical talent, she has an innate ability to move people through her music. He was a major factor in Nodame's advance in music, and when Nodame was in a slump due to her loss at her first competition (she lost due to a lack of time to memorize all the necessary songs), submitted an application to an overseas musical college for her.
After Nodame became famous, one of the first things she did when she returned to Japan was to give Etoh and Tanioka a private recital, presumably in appreciation of their help.
Voiced by: Kazuya Nakai (Japanese); Dave Mallow (English) Live action actor: Kosuke Toyohara
Hajime Tanioka (谷岡 肇, Tanioka Hajime)
A piano teacher at Momogaoka, said to specialize in "drop-out" students. Chiaki is re-assigned to Tanioka after his loud argument with Kouzou Etoh in chapter 1. He discovers that Nodame is already a student of Tanioka's, and one of the first assignments Tanioka assigns him is to perform a Mozart piano duet with Nodame, which also entails teaching her, and himself, the focus and discipline to play well with others.
Voiced by: Mitsuru Ogata (Japanese); Robert Buchholz (English) Live action actor: Masahiko Nishimura
Toru Kikuchi (菊池 亨, Kikuchi Tōru)
A womanizing cello player and one of the founders of the R☆S Orchestra along Chiaki, Kiyora, and Kuroki. Easily recognizable by his crew cut and small glasses. He had been studying in Boston prior to the creation of the R☆S Orchestra, and at the end of that year, had returned to Boston.
Voiced by: Junichi Suwabe (Japanese); Peter Doyle (English) Live action actor: Mukai Osamu

== In Paris ==
Franck Latoine (フランク・ラントワーヌ, Furanku Rantowānu)
A French piano student who lives in the same apartment complex as Chiaki and Nodame. He befriended Nodame when they were taking the entrance exam to study in Paris. He is a fan of Japanese anime, his special favorites are the anime Shakugan no Shana and Nodame's favorite series, the fictional Puri Gorota. He had a slight crush on Nodame, but fell out of it once he saw her obsession with anime (which he said was too much for even him to handle, as she could recite all the lines of Puri Gorota from heart) and Chiaki. Franck previously studied at the same school as Yunlong, but after seeing Professor Auclair, chose to transfer to the Conservatory.
Voiced by: Shintaro Asanuma Live action actor: Eiji Wentz
Tatiana “Tanya” Vishneva (Татьяна Вишнёва (Таня))) (タチヤーナ・ヴィシニョーワ (ターニャ), Tachiyāna Vishinyōwa (Tānya))
An attractive Russian senior piano student who lives in the same apartment complex as Chiaki, Nodame, Franck, and Yunlong. Her piano playing is somewhat skillful but she lacks motivation and confidence in her ability, which seems to be the reason behind her fixation on finding an affluent boyfriend in France. She initially finds Kuroki rather gloomy, but eventually develops strong feelings for him.
After being influenced by Nodame and company, she finds the motivation to work harder on her piano but is too late to improve them enough to place in a competition she took part in. She later becomes Kuroki's accompanist on the piano, and accepts his marriage proposal.
Voiced by: Shizuka Itō Live action actor: Becky
Yunlong Li (李 雲龍, Ri Yunron)
A piano player who lives in the same apartment complex as Nodame and Chiaki do in Paris. He is Chinese and tends to become very sentimental, especially when homesickness is mentioned. He attends a different Conservatory than Nodame. In contrast to Chiaki and Nodame, he is driven to succeed by the expectations of his family. He has intense stage fright.
When Chiaki went on a world tour for 3 months, Yunlong and Nodame developed a good friendship which made Chiaki, on his return, uncomfortable and unwilling to meet Yunlong. After a mediocre performance at a piano competition Tanya also participated in, he reluctantly considers returning to China to become a piano teacher. He enjoys eating good food, particularly if Chiaki cooks or pays for it.
Voiced by: Satoshi Hino
Rui Son (孫 Rui, Son Rui)
A world-famous Chinese pianist who is making a gradual comeback, Rui takes a liking to Chiaki soon after meeting him, and treats him like a younger brother; she particularly likes teasing him about Nodame. Rui's appearance in Chiaki's life results in Nodame becoming jealous as well as insecure in her ability to perform on a level that will fit Chiaki's, particularly as Rui's fame unintentionally thwarts several attempts for Nodame to perform with Chiaki. Rui eventually decides to study music in Paris, though is met with opposition from her well-meaning mother, who pressures Rui to perform in more public performances. Though skilled, she lacks the style and substance of Nodame's performances and seeks to find the same element in order to improve her own musical ability.
Voiced by: Sayaka Ohara Live action actor: Yu Yamada
Jean Donnadieu (ジャン・ドナデュウ, Jan Donadyuu)
Another of Viella's students, who also works in Paris and considers himself a rival to Chiaki. He has a very affectionate and devoted, if a bit arrogant, girlfriend named Yuko, whom Jean regards as his "Goddess of Victory".
Voiced by: Toshiyuki Morikawa Live action actor: Giry Vincent
Charles Auclair (シャルル・オクレール, Sharuru Okurēru)
An esteemed and well-known professor of piano at the Conservatory where Nodame studies. During Nodame's piano competition in Japan, he is one of the judges and is captivated by her performance, but soon detects her immaturity in attitude towards music, referring her as "still a baby" (later on "Bebe-chan"). Auclair offers Nodame (through Etoh) an opportunity to study in Paris and selects her to become one of his students, much to Frank's envy. He refers to Nodame as "Bebe-chan" and sees that she has tremendous potential, but limited time to hone her skill and recognizes Nodame's reluctance to become a professional pianist.
He enjoys food and cooking.
Voiced by: Motomu Kiyokawa

== Other characters ==
Elise (エリーゼ, Erīze)
Elise is Stresemann's hard-nosed agent and business manager. Aided by her bodyguard Oliver she kidnapped Chiaki in volume 11 and forced him to sign with her agency too. She is not above trickery or aggressive methods to ensure the success of her clients, often forcing them to endure demanding schedules.
Voiced by: Tomoko Kawakami (Japanese); Karen Strassman (English) Live action actor: Michiko Kichise
Sebastiano Viella (セバスチャーノ・ヴィエラ, Sebasuchāno Viera)
World-renowned conductor and Chiaki's mentor. Stresemann is rather adverse towards Viella and initially extended his dislike of the conductor to Chiaki. Viella has considered Chiaki as his apprentice since the boy was twelve and is a surrogate father figure to Chiaki. Viella is an acquaintance of both of Chiaki's parents.
Voiced by: Masashi Ebara (Japanese); Steve Kramer (English) Live action actor: Zdeněk Mácal (Voiced by: Takeshi Aono (Japanese))
Seiko Miyoshi (三善 征子, Miyoshi Seiko)
Chiaki's mother, who retained custody of Chiaki after her divorce with Chiaki's father. She and Chiaki lived in Europe for several years during Chiaki's childhood, during which Chiaki became Viella's student, before they returned to Japan. She is frequently away from home on business and does work involving culture and music. She takes a liking to Nodame, especially after she cured her son of his phobia. She is respected by the students in Chiaki and Nodame's boarding house as their patron and is referred to as "Madame Seiko."
Chiaki's family
Chiaki's maternal family, who include his uncle Takehiko and his younger cousins Toshihiko and Yuiko. They desperately want Chiaki to be able to achieve his dream of becoming a conductor and tried various methods, from hypnotism to knocking Chiaki unconscious in order to get him to leave Japan. While they find Nodame extremely strange, they grow to like her, especially young Yuiko, and believe she is talented enough to be a professional concert pianist but would not be a very good kindergarten teacher as Nodame wants to become. They are overjoyed when Chiaki finally overcomes his fear of flying on planes.
Masayuki Chiaki (千秋 雅之, Chiaki Masayuki)
Chiaki's absentee father, a famous pianist throughout Europe. He and Chiaki's mother divorced when Chiaki was very young and Chiaki resents how his father never tried to spend time with him. He appears to be a selfish man who dislikes how his old acquaintances insist of trying to unite him with his son. Neither Chiaki or Masayuki openly contact one another.
Yukihisa Matsuda (松田 幸久, Matsuda Yukihisa)
The conductor Chiaki chooses to replace him as conductor of the Rising Star Orchestra (R☆S).
James DePriest (ジェームズ・デプリースト, Jēmuzu Depurīsuto)
The musical director of the Roux-Marlet Orchestra in Paris. He hires Chiaki as the Orchestra's new resident conductor after hearing his performance at his Paris Debut and at the recommendation of Stresemann who used to be the Conductor of the orchestra. Like the character of Megumi Noda, he is based on a real person of the same name. The real James DePriest was Permanent Conductor of The Tokyo Metropolitan Symphony Orchestra from 2005 to 2008. DePriest also conducted the Nodame Orchestra, which provided the music for both the live-action drama and anime adaptations.
Live action actor: James DePriest (Voiced by: Akihiko Ishizumi (Japanese))

== See also ==
- List of Nodame Cantabile episodes
