= Gravity Rush 2 =

2017 video game

- Developer: Japan Studio (Note: Additional work by Media.Vision and Racjin.)
- Publisher: Sony Interactive Entertainment
- Director: Keiichiro Toyama
- Producer: Makato Isomine
- Designer: Junya Okura
- Programmers: Atsushi Nakamura; Toshitake Tsuchikura
- Artists: Shunsuke Saito; Takeshi Oga
- Writers: Keiichiro Toyama; Naoko Sato
- Composer: Kohei Tanaka
- Platform: PlayStation 4
- Release: AU/EU: January 18, 2017; JP: January 19, 2017; NA/UK: January 20, 2017
- Genre: Action-adventure
- Mode: Single-player

Gravity Rush 2, known in Japan as Gravity Daze 2, (Note: ''Gravity Daze 2 (GRAVITY DAZE 2/重力的眩暈完結編：上層への帰還の果て，彼女の内宇宙に収斂した選択, Guraviti Deizu/Jūryoku-teki Memai kanketsu-hen: Jōsō e no Kikan no Hate, Kanojo no Uchi Uchū ni Shūren Shita Sentaku; lit. "Gravity Daze 2/Gravitational Dizziness Final Chapter: The End of the Repatriation of the Upper Stratum, Choices That Converged Her Inner Space")) is a 2017 action-adventure game developed and published by Sony Interactive Entertainment for the PlayStation 4. It is the sequel to Gravity Rush. Directed by Keiichiro Toyama, the core mechanic of the game is the player's ability to manipulate gravity, allowing unique movements and navigation. The game follows Kat, a gravity-shifting teenage girl and super-heroine, after she is drawn from her home of Hekseville into another universe and must liberate the citizens of Jirga Para Lhao from its rulers.

== Gameplay ==
The gravity-controlling mechanics introduced in Gravity Rush are expanded in Gravity Rush 2. Players are able to choose among three gravity styles: the original style from the first game, Lunar and Jupiter. Lunar is light and increases Kat's speed and her ability to jump higher. Jupiter makes Kat feel heavy, giving her attacks more impact. Players can change between gravity styles using the touch pad.

Director Keiichiro Toyama stresses immersion with Gravity Rush 2. Toyama says the key to this is expanding the universe and making Kat and her surroundings feel more alive. The new city in the game, for example, is more lively and colorful, and Kat is able to chat with the city's inhabitants, throw gang signs, and people will react organically. Environments are destructible.

The Nevi return in Gravity Rush 2, along with other enemies, such as human soldiers, some of whom operate combat mechs. Fellow Gravity Shifter Raven, who appeared as an antagonist for most of the first game, becomes an AI-controlled ally who can fight with Kat during certain battles.

As Gravity Rush 2 has three times the amount of missions than its predecessor, the game is between 20–40 hours long. The game map is 2.5 times larger than the one from the original.

== Plot ==
Gravity Rush 2 takes place directly after the events of Gravity Rush, and a prequel anime called Gravity Rush: The Animation ~ Overture ~. In the city of Hekseville, reconstruction is progressing after the incident caused by the former mayor, D’nelica. After a gravitational disturbance is reported in the floating district of Neu Hiraleon, Kat travels there with her gravity shifting partner Raven, and Syd, a police officer, to investigate. Following a fight with mysterious androids, the three are sucked into a gravitational vortex and transported to a different world, along with the entire district.

The events of the game begin when Kat and Syd arrive in the impoverished Banga Village. They befriend a girl named Cecie, who also arrived in mysterious circumstances, and work to mine Gravity Ore, traveling into Rift Planes to harvest it to sell to unscrupulous trader Vogo Sun. After preventing his attempt to shortchange the village, they travel to the floating city of Jirga Para Lhao for supplies. There, they realize that the city's rich are oppressing its poor through military force, and the use of Raven, who has been brainwashed to believe she is called Night Gale. Kat battles Raven, freeing her and sparking an uprising against the Council, the city's usurping rulers. The insurrection succeeds, restoring the people of Banga to their rightful rule of Jirga Para Lhao.

However, Neu Hiraleon appears, having become a giant Nevi after landing in a Rift Plane, and kills the Council. Kat and Raven defeat it and rescue Cecie, who it was using as a power source. In doing so, Kat is again sucked back into Hekseville. There, she meets Kali Angel, a mysterious Shifter who replaced her as the city's hero, and Dr. Brahman, a brilliant scientist who designed a city-wide, robotic, Nevi defense system. Brahman becomes mayor despite an attack by rebels, but it is soon revealed that the rebels are right, and Brahman is a madman who plans to use the crystal-induced powers of his kidnapped "daughters", Kali and Cecie, also known as Durga Angel, to stop time itself. Kat and Raven, who arrived back in Hekseville along with Cecie, defeat Brahman and his daughters, killing both him and Kali, and saving the city, with the help of the city of Jirga Para Lhao, which came through a tear in space.

In the game's final chapter, Kat encounters a glowing girl, who tells her that the "dark ocean" under the city will destroy Hekseville and the world. On the advice of Alias, Kat and Raven travel to the top of the World Pillar, finding the frozen city of Eto. King Cai informs her that she is the former queen, and cloisters her in the castle due to an "illness", but Kat realizes she was brainwashed and that he is holding Raven prisoner. After fighting off Cai's Nevi minions, Kat is rescued by Creator Bit, and forced to remember her past. She realizes that Syd is Alias, and one of her former retainers, and that they were betrayed by her other retainer, Xicero, for wanting to save the people below from the dark ocean. However, the Creators decided to save them, as they were swayed by Kat's altruism.

King Cai releases the glowing girl from a crystal, revealing her to be Elektricitie, the personification of electrical energy, and expressing an intent to hasten the world's demise. The people of Hekseville are unable to stop her, but are able to stall until Kat arrives and defeats her, albeit through the sacrifice of the other Creators. King Cai is slapped by Kat, and merges with his Guardian, Wolp, into a giant monster that is the manifestation of the black hole below the city. This dark being offers Kat a deal to make her survive the end and eventual rebirth of the world, but she chooses to defeat him with the help of the populace, and seal the black hole by sacrificing herself. A year later, Kat makes a return, much to Raven's shock, while Cai mysteriously escapes from police custody.

== Development and release ==
Work on Gravity Rush 2 started when the development of Gravity Rush was finished. It was announced on September 20, 2013 at the Tokyo Game Show and was originally known as 'Team Gravity Project'. During their Tokyo Game Show 2015 presentation, Sony unveiled the game as Gravity Rush 2. Kohei Tanaka, who worked on the music for Gravity Rush, returned to compose the music for Gravity Rush 2.

On November 11, 2016, Gravity Rush 2 went gold. Originally scheduled to be released on December 2, 2016, the game was delayed to January 2017 by Sony in order to ensure that the game would not compete with other triple-A titles set to be released during the Christmas period.

On December 3, 2016, it was announced that the free DLC that Sony was offering to make up for the delay will be "Raven's Choice", allowing players to play as the secondary main character Raven, Another Story The Ark of Time – Raven’s Choice will see Raven battling to save the Lost Children trapped inside the Ark at the end of the first Gravity Rush. On March 23, 2017, the "Free Raven" DLC was released.

An anime, titled Gravity Rush: The Animation ~ Overture ~, was released on December 26, 2016. Animated by Studio Khara, it serves as a bridge to fill the narrative gap between Gravity Rush and Gravity Rush 2.

2B's outfit from Nier: Automata was released for free in Japan on April 27, 2017 and in the West on May 5, 2017.

Gravity Rush 2's servers shut down on July 19, 2018. It was previously announced that the shutdown would occur on January. However, it was extended, due to fan criticism of the announcement.

== Reception ==
Reception

Aggregate score
Aggregator	Score
Metacritic	80/100

Review scores
Publication	Score
Destructoid	9.5/10
Electronic Gaming Monthly	9/10
Game Informer	7.5/10
GameRevolution	4/5
GameSpot	9/10
GamesRadar+	3/5
IGN	8.4/10
Polygon	7.5/10
USGamer	9/10

Gravity Rush 2 received "generally favorable" reviews from critics, according to review aggregator website Metacritic.

Peter Brown of GameSpot praised how the game improved upon its predecessor by calling it "more than just a simple follow-up, Gravity Rush 2 exceeds expectations". Brown noted the variety and scope of the world and felt that the story was much improved by being more consistent and engaging. Jaz Rignall of USGamer was also positive regarding the story, considering the character development, light and fun approach and stylized delivery to be the Gravity Rush 2's stronger element, even favorably comparing them to Studio Ghibli productions. Reviewing for Polygon, Whitney Reynolds noted the protagonist Kat's fun characterization and enthusiasm as reasons to play through the optional side quests. Reynolds also praised the overall larger cast of female characters. Chris Carter of Destructoid considered the visuals to be enhanced by having been developed for the PS4 first, unlike the first Gravity Rush while still retaining well received elements from before, including the hand drawn art and comic book-styled story transitions, calling the overall looks "gorgeous".

Miranda Sanchez of IGN was positive to the gravity altering gameplay and the new additions to Kat's abilities, progression and their use in the game's many activities and combat, the latter of which made "more interesting by offering creativity options with Kat’s movements". However Sanchez did critique certain instances of "unfortunately long missions in smaller spaces that made the otherwise cooperative camera a pain". David Roberts of GamesRadar also praised the gravity-based movement throughout the open-world environment yet was critical of the camera controls, particularity in small spaces calling it "ill-equipped to keep up". In addition Roberts was negative towards to "ground based" missions that contrasted with other sections of the game.

=== Sales ===
Gravity Rush 2 had sold 102,630 units in Japan by February 15, 2017. While not confirmed by Sony, it was assumed that the game was not a commercial success.

=== Accolades ===
Polygon ranked the game 19th on their list of the 50 best games of 2017. The game was nominated for "Best PS4 Game" in Destructoid's Game of the Year Awards 2017; and for "Best PlayStation 4 Game", "Best Action-Adventure Game", and "Best Original Music" in IGN's Best of 2017 Awards.

Year	Award	Category	Result	Ref
2017	The Independent Game Developers' Association Awards	Visual Design	Nominated	
2018	National Academy of Video Game Trade Reviewers Awards	Camera Direction in a Game Engine	Nominated	
2018	National Academy of Video Game Trade Reviewers Awards	Control Design, 3D	Nominated	
2018	National Academy of Video Game Trade Reviewers Awards	Costume Design	Nominated	
2018	National Academy of Video Game Trade Reviewers Awards	Direction in a Game Cinema	Nominated	
2018	National Academy of Video Game Trade Reviewers Awards	Game Engineering	Nominated	
