= Chihiro Kusaka =

Japanese voice actress

- Born: December 9, 1978 (age 47)
- Other names: Voice actress

Chihiro Kusaka (日下 ちひろ, Kusaka Chihiro; born December 9, 1978) is a Japanese voice actress from Fudai, Iwate. She is affiliated with Production Baobab. Her former stage name is Shizuka Sasaki (佐々木 静香, Sasaki Shizuka).

== Voice roles ==
=== Television animation ===
- Ceres, The Celestial Legend (Shuro Tsukasa)
- Detective School Q (Musashi Hachiya)
- Idolmaster: Xenoglossia (Gojō)
- Machine Robo Rescue (Makoto Aikawa, Kaizaki Kitazawa)
- Mermaid Melody Pichi Pichi Pitch (Makoto)
- Mermaid Melody Pichi Pichi Pitch Pure (Nagisa Shirai)
- Princess Comet (Karon)

=== Video games ===
- Crash Tag Team Racing (MotorWorld pedestrian) (Japanese dub)

=== Dubbing roles ===
- The Glass House (TV edition) (Rhett Baker)
- Power Rangers: Lightspeed Rescue (Kelsey Winslow (Sasha Williams))

=== Compact disc ===
- Gangan Drama CD: Fullmetal Alchemist: The Land of Sand (Alphonse Elric)
