= Kat (Gravity Rush) =

Video game character

- Gravity Rush character
- Concept art of Kat and her guardian, Dusty (lower left)
- First game: Gravity Rush (2012)
- Created by: Keiichiro Toyama
- Designed by: Shunsuke Saito
- Voiced by: Sanae Kobayashi

In-universe information
- Origin: Eto

Kat, known in Japan as Kitten, is a fictional character and the protagonist of the Gravity Rush series. A young woman with retrograde amnesia, she awakens in the city of Hekseville after falling from the sky, and sets out to discover the origins of her power to shift gravity. She becomes a hero to the people of the city after defending them from the threat of mysterious creatures called the Nevi. Her powers stem from Dusty, a supernatural, catlike organism that is bound to her, and whom she later realizes is a type of being known as a guardian. Her rival and later ally, Raven (Crow in Japan), is a fellow shifter with a crow guardian named Xii who is said to be Kat’s other half.

Kat was noted by the developers as a fan-favorite character, and has received critical praise for the unique nature of her powers, leading to inventive gameplay scenarios, as well as her optimistic personality, which runs in contrast to typical superheroes. In addition to the two Gravity Rush games and an anime short, she has had numerous cameo appearances in other titles of varying genres, and been depicted as an action figure.

== Characteristics ==
Kat is a young woman with dark skin, red eyes, and blonde hair. She wears a black romper held on her body by elastic, decorative pieces and accessories of gold metal. She also wears a cape-like scarf on her back, a matching headband, and two bracers, as well as tall socks with gold high heels. Aside from her normal outfit, she is able to equip a number of alternate outfits, some mission-specific, including a French maid uniform, a Phantasy Star Online 2 costume, and a downloadable content costume based on 2B from Nier: Automata, a crossover decided on the spot when developers from both games met at a PlayStation Matsuri event to celebrate Nier's Japanese launch in February 2017. Her personality is heroic, "naively innocent" and upbeat.

Dusty is able to transform into a larger and more powerful being, Panther, when in combat, and Kat can temporarily merge with Dusty for enhanced combat strength and health recovery, a transformation called "Panther Mode" that is unlocked for free use in Gravity Rush 2. (Note: Tutorial: Panther Mode: Hold touchpad when Kat's Panther Power is full to transform into the Panther. While in Panther Mode, Kat will recover health and unleash devastating attacks. (Gravity Rush 2 Episode 19: Dimmed Light)) Xii is capable of a similar phenomenon, becoming Phoenix. In that game's DLC (downloadable content) chapter, The Ark of Time - Raven's Choice, Bit, one of the world's gods and creator of the guardians, reveals that both Kat and Raven are two halves of a single being. (Note: Bit: Raven, you can't do this alone. [...] Your other half. The other Shifter. You need to come together. [...] Yes, the other Shifter's guardian can help. Together, you can be whole. (Gravity Rush 2: The Ark of Time - Raven's Choice Episode 6: Unshed Tears)) When Kat combines her guardian with Raven's, they create Gryps, a far larger griffin-like creature with immense power. If Raven initiates the transformation instead, they create the similar Sphinx.

== Appearances ==
Kat initially awakens after falling out of the sky and landing in a playground in Hekseville, a city attached to the World Pillar, a massive, vertical stone cylinder with no obvious bottom or top. Realizing she has amnesia, she sets out to look for the origins of her gravity-shifting powers and begins helping people in Hekseville. Eventually she discovers the threat of the Nevi, mysterious interdimensional beings that begin attacking the citizens of Hekseville, and becomes the city's defender, the "Gravity Queen". She comes into conflict with Raven, a fellow gravity shifter of unknown origin, who later becomes her close friend and ally, helping her save the city from the Sea Anemone, an anti-Nevi weapon created by the ruthless Alderman D'nelica.

A two-episode anime OVA, Gravity Rush: Overture, bridges the gap between Gravity Rush and Gravity Rush 2, showing the daily life of Kat, who teams up with Raven in a final confrontation with a new mysterious enemy, later revealed to be creations of Dr. Brahman, a deranged scientist who presents himself as the city's gentlemanly savior from the Nevi, but actually seeks to permanently slow down time.

In Gravity Rush 2, Kat is taken through a portal into Jirga Para Lhao, a parallel universe. She saves its people from oppression by its rulers, and is eventually warped back to Hekseville, where she foils Dr. Brahman's plans once and for all by defeating his adoptive daughters, Durga and Kali Angel. Following the apparent ending of the game, Kat is confronted by a mysterious Shining Girl in the postgame who beckons her up the World Pillar. She realizes that she is actually Queen Alua, ruler of Eto, the kingdom that lies at the World Pillar's pinnacle. Xicero, one of her advisers, attempted to murder her for wanting to shelter the people of Hekseville from an oncoming black hole, causing her to fall down to Hekseville and suffer amnesia. She escapes the clutches of her successor, the evil King Cai, and returns to Hekseville, where she stops the Shining Girl, who is actually Elektricitie, and then prevents the city's destruction and rebirth at the hands of a dark force that has merged with Cai's guardian, the deer-like Wolp. She seals away the black hole, seemingly perishing in the process. A final scene, seemingly from Kat's perspective, shows her encountering Raven a year later, as Raven reacts with shock.

In the side-story The Ark of Time - Raven's Choice, a prequel to the second game, Kat is shown helping Raven in an attempt to open the Ark, an ancient transportation device carrying lost children from Boutome, a makeshift town at the very bottom of the World Pillar. Dr. Brahman's plan to unlock it backfires, freezing time and damaging the fabric of the universe, and causing beings called Collectors to appear in response that threaten to destroy the Ark. Dusty ultimately assists Raven in reuniting with Kat, and Raven prevents Kat from being purged from existence, fusing Xii with Dusty to defeat a giant Collector.

In games unrelated to the Gravity Rush series, Kat appeared as a playable DLC character in PlayStation All-Stars Battle Royale and Everybody's Golf 6. A costume of Kat was added to Ragnarok Odyssey Ace, and she was added to Destiny of Spirits as a summonable spirit. A robot dressed as Kat makes a cameo reference in the Astro Bot (2024) under the name "Gravity Shifter".

== Development ==
Kat's gravity shifting abilities were inspired by The Incal, a 1981 graphic novel series by Moebius and Alejandro Jodorowsky depicting a sprawling city. Its main character was shown being thrown from a building in one of its earliest moments, similar to how Kat "falls" through the air. Her cat Dusty was inspired by The Eyes of the Cat, a 1978 work by the same authors. Keiichiro Toyama, the series' director and designer, stated that he made Kat a female lead so that she would look "cute" even if the player failed, because her movement was difficult to control.

During the development of the original Gravity Rush, scenario writer Naoko Sato was initially worried that Kat would come off as "too Japanese" for overseas audiences, which the game was also targeted at, and that being a young or female heroine would be a negative. Saying that Japanese audiences felt that youth and innocence was "sacred", while foreign countries judged it as "inexperienced and prone to death", Sato thought that a "cool and tough" female heroine would be better received. However, he was encouraged by an American staff member to do what he was best at, and decided to retain Kat's characterization.

Nevertheless, the developers attempted to appeal to overseas tastes when creating Kat's visual appearance and dialogue. The development team went through many iterations of Kat's design, trying to make her seem exotic, like she did not belong to any particular real-world country, including the "nonsense language" she speaks. Sato believed that Western audiences found characters who react realistically to situations relatable, so he decided to have her comment on the absurdity of situations within the game through her dialog. A scene in which Kat attacks Syd after she sees him changing clothes was modified due to feedback from overseas players, who felt her reaction was too violent and unfair to Syd, ultimately having Syd slip backwards in a panic instead after Kat's bath towel accidentally comes loose. Ultimately, Sato felt that Kat's personality was well-received overseas, with reviews describing her as "likeable".

Kat's concept and in-game artwork was drawn by Shunsuke Saito, who continued to Tweet additional fan art and animations of her on his personal account for years, including a diagram of how Kat puts on her signature outfit, and personal interpretations of a younger and older version of her. He departed Japan Studio on March 31, 2021.

== Merchandise ==
An articulated Figma figure of Kat was released in 2017, featuring two equipable sets of gear representing her Lunar and Jupiter style, different faceplates and hands, including a special one holding an apple as a Good Smile order bonus, and a rendition of Dusty.

== Reception ==
Ludwig Kietzmann of GamesRadar+, describing Gravity Rush as a "beautifully disguised superhero game", praised Kat as "unflinchingly upbeat" and just trying to figure out her place, and contrasted her exuberant personality and scarf with the typical notion of a superhero as a "tortured dude in a cape". Noting that she was a "delightful klutz", an aspect that tied into the game's initially imprecise controls, he stated that "there's an art to being utterly graceless in Gravity Rush". Writing that he imagined her apologizing to the people caught up in her gravity powers as she passed by, he concluded that Kat's "optimism in the face of her innate clumsiness" made her special, with her inelegance causing her to be believable and in "lock-step" with the player's own journey. Jenni Lada of Siliconera expressed similar admiration for Kat's personality in Gravity Rush 2. While she characterized Kat's mysterious origins as unremarkable, she nevertheless stated her belief that Kat's "delightfully optimistic, sometimes snarky, and always heartfelt" conversations with other characters made the game feel more plausible and sold her as a heroine. Describing Kat and Raven as feeling like sisters, she said that it was a "wonderful thing" seeing them open up and care about one other during their bonding moments.

Steven Strom of Paste Magazine stated that while Kat's amnesia was clichéd, it freed her from the typical superhero origin story, noting that such elaborate backstories reflected a cynical lack of belief that superheroes would perform selfless acts without an outside reason. In contrast, he highlighted that Kat helped people due to her natural empathy rather than a past tragedy that befell her. He called what Kat does with her powers "endearing", since she uses them for "smaller, kinder acts of heroism", "literally gain[ing] a wider perspective on the world". Richard Eisenbeis of Kotaku called Kat not "exactly the ideal heroine", characterizing her as an "accidental mass-murderer" due to her penchant for collateral damage, despite her pure intentions.

Patrick Klepek and Austin Walker of Vice stated that, in Gravity Rush 2, while Kat is initially a "cheery optimist" who assumes the best in people and is easy to fool, she gradually has her eyes opened to the inequality of Jirga Para Lhao and must become less naive to take on the oppressive Council that controls it. Klepek called one of his favorite moments in the game the choice to let Kat decide whether to deliver a barrel of fuel to the wealthy upper residents, or instead violate her orders and assist the poor lower denizens. They were divided on their opinion of the game's epilogue, calling it "forced", but also saying it provided thoughtful context for Kat's attitude after falling from Eto. They called her motivation to shelter evacuees from below an impactful moral choice, and an impressive metaphor for a national leader facing a refugee crisis.

Sammy Barker of Push Square wrote that Kat had been "mistreated" by Sony, citing the company's rapid shutdown of the Gravity Rush 2 servers and the closure of Japan Studio, as well as her apparent removal from a banner celebrating International Women's Day on the PlayStation Store, calling it a "cardinal sin".
