= Gravity Rush =

2012 video game

- Developer: Japan Studio (Note: Remastered developed by Bluepoint Games.)
- Publisher: Sony Computer Entertainment
- Director: Keiichiro Toyama
- Producer: Makato Isomine
- Designer: Junya Okura
- Programmer: Hirotaka Yokokawa
- Artists: Yoshiaki Yamaguchi; Shunsuke Saito; Takeshi Oga
- Writers: Keiichiro Toyama; Naoko Sato
- Composer: Kohei Tanaka
- Engine: PhyreEngine
- Platforms: PlayStation Vita; Remastered; PlayStation 4
- Release: JP: February 9, 2012; NA: June 12, 2012; AU: June 14, 2012; EU: June 15, 2012; Remastered: JP: December 10, 2015; NA: February 2, 2016; AU: February 3, 2016; EU: February 5, 2016
- Genre: Action-adventure
- Mode: Single-player

Gravity Rush, known in Japan as Gravity Daze, (Note: Guraviti Deizu/Jūryoku-teki Memai: Jōsō e no Kikan ni Oite, Kanojo no Nai-Uchū ni Shōjita Setsudō (Japanese: グラビティデイズ/重力的眩暈:上層への帰還において彼女の内宇宙に生じた摂動; lit. Gravitational Dizziness: The Perturbation of Her Inner Space Caused by the Repatriation of the Upper Stratum)) is a 2012 action-adventure video game developed and published by Sony Computer Entertainment for the PlayStation Vita. Gravity Rush Remastered, a high definition remaster developed by Bluepoint Games for the PlayStation 4, was released in 2015 in Japan and 2016 in the West. In Gravity Rush, players control Kat, an amnesiac with the power to manipulate how gravity affects her, and uses her powers to help the people of Hekseville against the mysterious Nevi, helping its people against threats and uncovering the mystery behind her past. Gameplay has Kat exploring the open world of Hekseville, completing missions for townsfolk and defeating Nevi. Navigation and combat heavily involve Kat's gravity-altering abilities.

Beginning development for PlayStation 3 in 2008 under the title Gravité before moving to the Vita, Gravity Rush was conceived by director Keiichiro Toyama prior to his work on Silent Hill and the Siren series. The team overcame technical challenges due to the gameplay and chosen hardware. The world, story and artistic style drew from Japanese and Western comics including the work of French artist Jean Giraud. The music was composed by Kohei Tanaka, who worked on the project from an early stage.

Upon release, Gravity Rush received generally positive reviews from critics, who praised the art style and Kat's portrayal, but aspects of gameplay and control issues were criticized. The game had sold 200,000 units by August 2012. A sequel, Gravity Rush 2, was released for the PlayStation 4 in 2017.

== Gameplay ==
Gravity Rush protagonist Kat using her powers of gravity manipulation, aiming several objects at a target during a time trial

Gravity Rush is an action-adventure video game in which players take the role of Kat, a young woman who can manipulate how gravity affects her, allowing her to walk on walls and fly through the air. Kat navigates the game's open world of Hekseville both on foot using roads and walkways, and using her powers; activating Kat's abilities, the player tilts the PlayStation Vita, aiming Kat and allowing her to "fall" in that direction. Kat can use her abilities to walk on vertical surfaces or areas such as ceilings and the underside of structures. Kat's gravity-based abilities are tied to an energy meter which decreases when her powers are active. When fully depleted, Kat's powers deactivate until the meter recharges.

Combat takes place either on the ground or with Kat using her powers against enemies. When on the ground, Kat attacks by kicking enemies in their weak spots. When using her powers, Kat can rotate and aim at those weak spots. Increasing Kat's distance before using her powers increases the amount of damage. Some abilities used in combat, such as the ability to locate and lock onto weak points, are tied to a cooldown timer which must replenish before being used again.

During navigation, Kat can find three types of pick-ups; blue cubes which restore her energy and allow prolonged use of her gravity powers; green crystals which restore health; and pink crystals which act as the game's currency. These gems are rewarded by completing quests given by non-player characters (NPCs), and can be used to buy and upgrade new abilities for Kat, or attributes such as health and energy. Quests include escorting NPCs, fighting packs of enemies, and making deliveries. During these and other types of quest, Kat can use a particular ability to pick up objects and carry them with her as she navigates Hekseville. Some areas require Kat to navigate platforming sections, which grant access to new abilities tied to the story.

== Plot ==
Gravity Rush opens with an amnesiac Kat waking up in Hekseville, a floating city around a structure called the World Pillar. Kat is accompanied by a mysterious cat named Dusty; in saving a boy from being swept up in a gravity storm, she discovers that Dusty has the ability to manipulate how gravity affects her, enabling her to help people fight monsters spawned from the storms called Nevi. After saving Syd, a police officer who becomes her friend, she learns that those with her powers are dubbed "Shifters" by Hekseville's people. As she begins helping the city's denizens, she is confronted by fellow Shifter Raven, who sees her as an enemy. Kat becomes involved in operations to catch Alias, a criminal linked to the Nevi — she eventually defeats him, sending him into a garbage crusher where he is killed. Alongside this, Kat helps restore sections of Hekseville swallowed by spatial rifts with the aid of Gade, a man who claims to be a "Creator". Kat restores all of Hekseville despite further interference from Raven, who apparently dies during a fight with Kat. Her exploits earn her the name "Gravity Queen". Following Alias' defeat and the return of the final missing part of Hekseville, Kat is offered a place in the city's military if she will follow orders of its commander, Yuri Gerneaux, but she refuses.

Kat then meets a woman who dropped the last letter she received from her deceased boyfriend over the edge of Hekseville. To find it, she travels inside the World Pillar, a gigantic column that supports Hekseville and stretches from the sky to below the clouds. On her way down, her Shifter powers fade, and she is confronted by Raven, but the two are attacked by Nushi, a giant Nevi. Kat wakes to find herself captive in Boutoume, a city beneath the Pillar, where a group of children are living under the protection of their leader Zaza. Kat and Raven help protect the children from Nushi, but they learn that the dark sea beneath Boutoume is slowly rising. One of the children, Cyanea, later confronts Kat — in a trance, while possessed by a being called a Dream Guardian, she reveals herself to be the Creator of the world through her dreams, and sends Kat into a dream where she learns that she is from a higher part of the World Pillar where she held a powerful position and suffered due to a great burden.

Having regained some of her forgotten power, Kat activates a ship called the Ark, which can transport everyone back to Hekseville. As the Ark launches after Kat beats back Nushi, Kat learns that Raven was originally one of the children trapped in Boutoume, and that she had been told by Hekseville's city alderman D'nelica not to retrieve them. On the way up, Kat succumbs to exhaustion and is separated from the Ark. Making her way back up the World Pillar, she ends up receiving the letter she was sent for from the boyfriend's ghost. Returning to Hekseville, she finds that a whole year has passed due to the temporal distortions experienced in the lower parts of the World Pillar—under constant Nevi attacks, Hekseville has come under martial law and D'nelica has become its mayor. Kat is forced to fight Nushi one last time, before it is destroyed by an enhanced military operative called Yunica. Syd has become part of the military after its absorption of the civilian police forces. Offered a second chance to join the military efforts against the Nevi, Kat again refuses. She is then asked by a scientist to help gather data about the Nevi, but it is a ruse to find out more about her Shifter powers.

After suffering from a nightmare about Alias, Kat wakes to find that Cyanea has reappeared, although Raven and the rest of the children are still missing. Attending a rally with Gade and Syd where D'nelica unveils the Nevi-destroying weapon Sea Anemone, Kat responds to a Nevi attack and is captured by Yunica together with Dusty. As Syd attempts to free her, the Sea Anemone — which was constructed with a Nevi core as part of D'nelica's plan to control both Hekseville and the Nevi — goes berserk and begins attacking the city. Cyanea's Dream Guardian self decides to intervene and frees Dusty, who subsequently frees Kat. Kat manages to damage the Sea Anemone, first with help from Yunica, who uses her mechanical weapons to damage its armor; then from Cyanea and Gade as they combine their powers with Kat's to summon the Ark as a missile. D'nelica activates the Sea Anemone's self-destruct function, heedless of the collateral damage, but Kat, Raven and Yunica are able to stop it before that happens, and fling it at Neu Hiraleon, where it explodes. The people hail Kat as their savior, while calling for the wounded D'nelica's resignation for his part of the fiasco. The children within the Ark remain in stasis, with Cyanea saying they will wake to help restore light to the world; D'nelica learns Kat's original identity through a red crystal in his possession; and Gerneaux remembers a prophecy about a harbinger of catastrophe falling from the world above, referring to Kat's appearance.

== Development ==
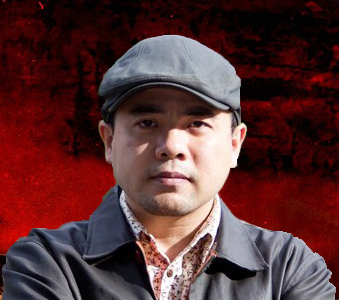
Keiichiro Toyama created the concept for Gravity Rush and would be its director and co-writer.

The initial concept for Gravity Rush came to Keiichiro Toyama during the beginning of his video game career when he joined Konami. His initial idea was a vague image of people floating in space, with later concepts and ideas forming over time. Due to his work first at Konami as director for Silent Hill, Toyama was labelled as a horror game director, leading him to work for Sony Computer Entertainment on the Siren series working out of the company's Japan Studio development team. As Siren: Blood Curse was nearing completion, and noting the combination of increasing costs and decreasing revenue for horror games, Toyama decided to prove his ability to design outside the horror genre and turn his concept for Gravity Rush into a video game. Toyama pitched Gravity Rush to Sony in April 2008 as a "gravity action" game for the PlayStation 3 (PS3) under the title Gravité. It was a title aimed at hardcore gamers which would be expanded with downloadable content (DLC). The main staff were made up of veterans of Toyama's Siren series.

Full production began following the completion of Siren: Blood Curse in mid-2008. When creating the project, the team combined the concepts of gravity manipulation and a protagonist flying through the air, with the gameplay being inspired by Toyama's experience with the Sixaxis wireless controller prior to the PS3's retail release. When creating the first prototype, the team used character models from Siren: Blood Curse to test the gravity-based physics. Development on the PS3 version ran between 2008 and 2009, with a concept video to help the team finalize the art style and gameplay being put together using Autodesk Maya during 2008. The team were implementing the Sixaxis controller as part of the gameplay. During 2009, Toyama received information about the Vita—then in development and known internally as "Next Gen Portable"—so he could test its capabilities. Impressed by the Vita's gyroscope system and its potential application to the gravity-based action of Gravity Rush, and further encouraged by SCE Worldwide Studios president Shuhei Yoshida, Toyama decided to shift development to the Vita.

When the project was being designed for PS3, the team felt confident they could match their concept video as the console had been out for two years prior to Gravity Rush beginning development, the team saw and encountered little difficulty working with the established hardware. The main issues faced by the team were the size of the game world, the amount of content, and how to program the game. When development shifted to the Vita, which was still in development and had no set hardware specifications, the staff size dropped and the team had to reassess their priorities as they needed to help demonstrate the platform's unique features with the game. Initially the Vita was expected to have similar capabilities to the PS3, allowing the team to carry over their previous development experience. When they realized that the Vita had far less power than the PS3, they needed to reassess the project, leading to their previous work being scrapped. Difficulties with the Vita's still-fluctuating hardware specifications during the first year of development forced Project Siren to develop the game on Microsoft Windows personal computers, a rarity for first-party Sony developers. By January 2011, the game was running on the Vita hardware and the team focused on polishing the graphics and gameplay. The pressure to create a first-party Vita title in time for the platform's year of release put a large burden on the development team. A moment Toyama remembered later was when the Vita was publicly revealed, which saw Gravity Rush announced as part of the platform's launch line-up; due to the game suffering from unresolved frame rate problems, Toyama felt anxious about completing the game.

=== Design ===
Toyama's greatest inspiration on the gameplay of Gravity Rush was Crackdown, influencing the upgrade system and open world. During early stages, the team contemplated giving players safe areas within which the gravity manipulation would play out similar to a puzzle, but test player feedback led to the gravity-based navigation being applied to an open world. The team discarded the concept of fall damage. Toyama had the team watch the film Hancock as a reference for Kat's "sluggish" movement through the air. The lack of a targeting reticle or automated aiming was included partially to focus player attention on the Vita's gyroscope functions and to prevent the game from being too easy. The touchscreen controls were intended to play a larger role in combat, but Toyama found the result more difficult to control and so restricted it to dodging. The map design, which used a simple 2D design, was meant to ease navigation for players exploring the city from above using Kat's powers. The most difficult gameplay move for the team was the Gravity Slide.

The decision to have an open world town caused the gravity manipulation mechanic to become the basis of nearly all gameplay elements. During early testing, the team created small test areas such as enclosed rooms and tunnels, first determining what cues to give players about which was up and down when manipulating gravity. To this end, they included flying vehicles, distinct architectural styles with clear tops and bottoms, and other elements such as the movements of people and how Kat's clothing behaves. A major issue with the gameplay was ensuring the environments had proper collision detection; while most games had multiple inaccessible areas which lacked collision detection, the gravity mechanic meant that the player could navigate a larger number of surfaces in the game, necessitating increased focus on ensuring collision detection for all surfaces worked as intended. During this period, the team used Havok software when testing both collision and the behavior of destructible elements. Kat's moveset during her navigation and combat used a combination of hand-animated and physics-based movements. The game used Sony's in-house PhyreEngine.

The game was designed to run consistently at 30 frames per second, with lower resolution graphics being used to allow both a consistent frame rate and quicker loading for environments. The team worked with Sony to create several graphical tricks, such as false reflections from character eyes during real-time cutscenes and transparent elements in the scenery, to keep the frame rate high while not compromising the game's graphical quality. The final game featured 300,000 polygons per frame, sitting between the standard polygon counts of the PlayStation 2 and the PS3; including shadow elements and other aspects, the polygon count expanded to the point that the team feared they could not maintain a steady frame rate. In response, they devises a type of polygon culling where graphics hidden by other nearer objects had their polygon count greatly decreased, with separate layers of culling for both the in-game camera perspective and its peripheral area, which was further enhanced using the game's ambient occlusion. A version of this system was also applied to the lighting engine, controlling where light and shadow effects needed to be during movement through the environment. Due to the game's graphics and its platform limitations, a special shader system was used for character model lighting so as to preserve both realistic lighting and the cel shaded graphics. Another unique shader was used for the game's pickups, giving them a translucent quality. The result enabled graphical quality comparable to the PS3, as the culling and shader technology worked around the Vita's hardware limitations.

=== Scenario and art ===
The scenario was written by Naoko Sato. The basic story and the script for some scenes were written by Toyama. The central story concept of two rival characters with similar superpowers was taken from comic books of the 1970s, with Toyama comparing the scenario to Hancock, The Bionic Woman and Majokko Megu-chan. The shift to Vita and the consideration of the game's Western market drastically impacted the game's story and presentation. To appeal to as broad a market as possible, the narrative and presentation were modeled after both Japanese anime and Western comic book narratives, in addition to the comic book influences. Despite being a direct shift from the dark tone of the Siren series, Toyama used the similar premise of a protagonist getting involved in a crisis in a strange town. The world's fictional language was seen as another potential problem when appealing to the Western market. A central theme in the story was Kat's growth as a character through her hardships, acting as a metaphor and medium for commentary on the modern class system and examining a stagnating world system. The Japanese title Gravity Daze was designed to both communicate the game's gravity-based premise and give an impression of strangeness. The long subtitle was meant to be impressive, with Toyama using the subtitle for Dr. Strangelove for inspiration. Due to production deadlines, the team had to cut much of the intended later narrative.

Toyama based the main protagonist on characters from American comic books such as Batman. The choice of a female protagonist proved difficult to implement, as research at the time showed games with female leads selling less in the West. Kat's personality was based on Toyama's own view of the world and ways of talking with people. Kat's young age factored into this; while young protagonists were a norm in Japan partially due to the culture of purity surrounding them, in the West having a young protagonist was contentious for multiple reasons. After consulting with Western Sony staff, it was decided to keep the female Kat as the main protagonist, with Sato designing Kat so she would appeal to a wide audience. To make Kat more appealing, Sato chose simple and well-known story tropes for Kat's storyline—such as her amnesia, solving a central mystery, and helping Hekseville's people—in addition to allowing players to hear Kat's inner thoughts during conversations and story cutscenes. Sato greatly decreased the amount of violence from the first draft while preserving the meaning of story scenes. A cited example of this was a scene where Sid came upon Kat bathing; while in the game Sid slipped and fell, in the original draft Kat would have kicked him, a style of physical humor common in Japanese anime but seen as unpopular overseas. The Nevi were designed to combine geometric shapes with the "feeling of life". The minor characters of Kat's cat and Raven's crow companions were intended to evoke history through their appearance and lack of expressive features.

The art director for Gravity Rush was Yoshiaki Yamaguchi, who had previously worked on the Siren series. Yamaguchi created the initial drafts of the game's planned female protagonist before Kat was created. When creating the town of Hekseville, Yamaguchi drew directly from comics, using line drawing to exaggerate building outlines and choosing unusual environmental colors. The core concept for the game's environments was "Living Background", presenting the game's comic book influences within a moving background. The effect was created using multiple shaders and different environmental effect layers. The process was draining for the relatively small team assigned with creating the graphics. The main characters were designed by Shunsuke Saito. Kat's design reflected the wish to appeal to Western players; her proportions, face and hair were more realistic than what many expected of Japanese character designs. The key words for Kat's design were "ninja", "strong woman" and "unknown nationality". Kat went through multiple drafts, with her final design meant to have no exact origin and hold an exotic quality similar to popular female game heroine Lara Croft. Enemy designs were by Takeshi Oga, while NPC designs are being handled by Yukiko Itano. The game's concept and cover art were created by Oga. When creating the cover art, Oga worked to convey the setting and gameplay elements of Gravity Rush.

The style and cel shaded graphics of Gravity Rush was influenced by Franco-Belgian comics, with Toyama citing artists Jean Giraud and Enki Bilal as direct inspiration. The choice allowed a combination of realism and fantastic elements that Yamaguchi felt was unique to the style. Another influence on the world design was the film The Fifth Element. The concept of Gravity Rush stemmed from a scene from The Incal, a graphic novel series illustrated by Giraud; several scenes showed characters falling through space, scenes which Toyama later emulated within Gravity Rush. The world's culture was based on modern-day cities, while the buildings and streets of Hekseville were based on towns and cities from Northern and Eastern Europe, combining old buildings with modern transport. Specific influences were the cities of Copenhagen and Amsterdam. Its design began with the World Pillar being at its center, then the rest of the city grew around it around the concept of a fixed time period for the whole city to allow for the creation of interesting locations. The game's spoken dialogue used a constructed language which sounded similar to French; Toyama created the language based on Giraud's bande dessinée work and his observations that Japanese dubs of French movies felt "natural". A constructed writing system, made mainly from English and romanized Japanese with letters removed in certain positions, was used for maps, in-world signage, and visual sound effects.

=== Music ===
The music was composed by Kohei Tanaka, noted for his work both in anime and on video games such as the Sakura Wars series and Resonance of Fate. Arrangements were done by Tanaka, Keiji Inai and Yasuhisa Murase. Tanaka was brought on board the project as Toyama felt Tanaka was the only one who could recall the orchestral melodies of animations from the 1970s. Similar to his work on the Sakura Wars series, Tanaka began working on the soundtrack from early on in development, resulting in Tanaka's work influencing the development of gameplay. Tanaka used a mixture of acoustic orchestra, electric guitar and bass, drums, and saxophone; in addition, he used a Synthesound board to create more experimental sounds. Rather than sticking to a single musical genre, Tanaka mixed genres to emulate the world and gameplay of Gravity Rush. While some songs were completed and approved quickly, others required several retakes and Tanaka sometimes had to defend his work from outside criticism. A particular concern for Tanaka was that the looping environmental tracks would not become tiresome for players.

The ending theme "Douse Shinundakara" was composed by Tanaka and arranged by Murase. The lyrics—which used the game's constructed language—were written by Toyama, while the theme was sung by Masako Toda. Toyama wrote the lyrics based on a portion of the game's script which saw Kat transported through an introspective vision about her past. At the time of writing, production was not going smoothly and Toyama was feeling frustrated and more conscious of death in the wake of a severe earthquake in Japan in 2011. Realizing that death was inevitable and that people should enjoy the moment, Toyama wrote the lyrics to imply this message. Toyama was worried during the recording process due to the lyrics being fictional, but Tanaka advised Toda to sing the song as if she were humming a tune in a bar.

An official album release, Gravity Daze Official Soundtrack, was published by Team Entertainment on March 21, 2012. The album has received positive reviews from music critics.

== Release ==
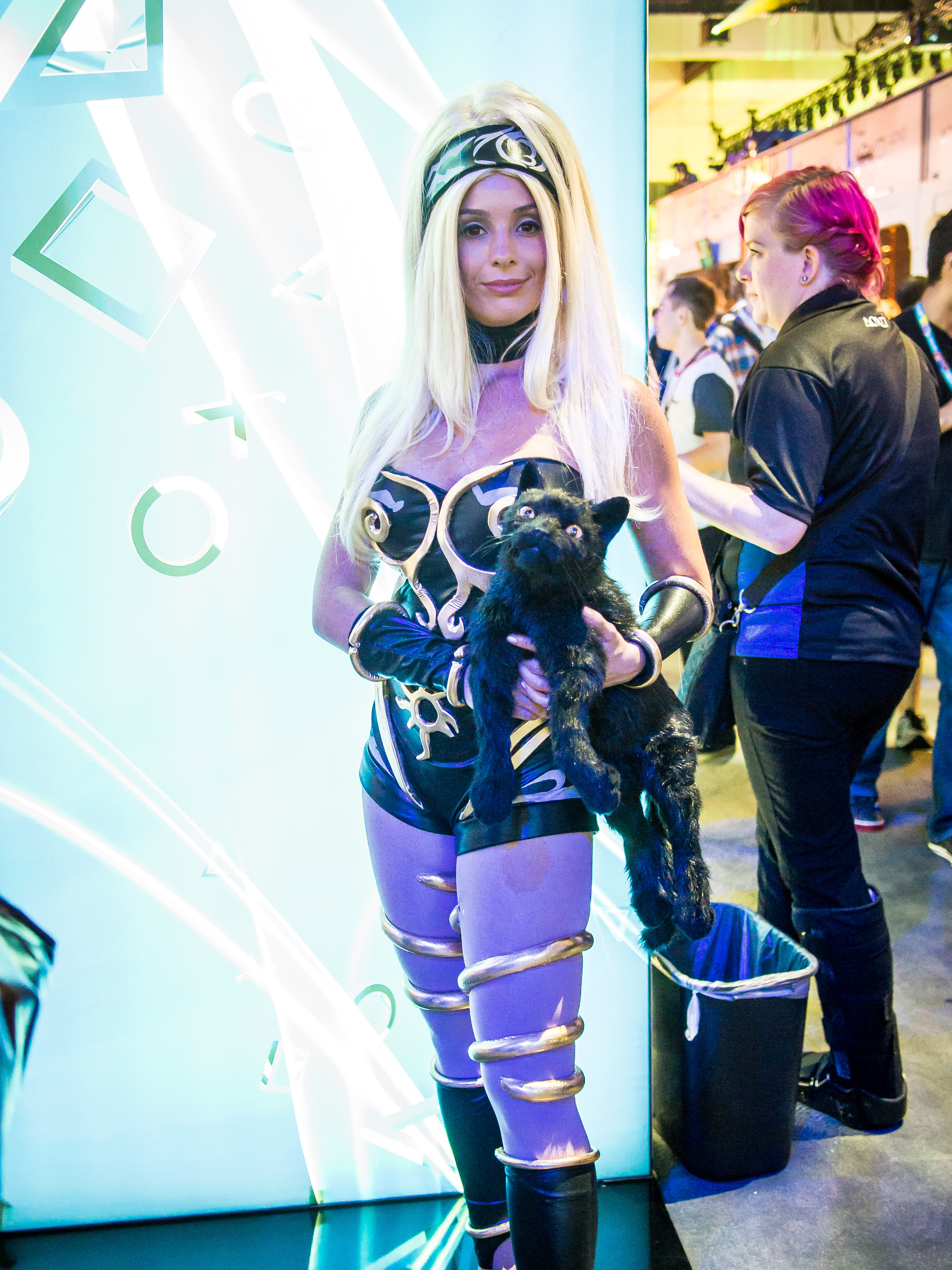
Promotion at E3 2013

Gravity Rush was announced under its Japanese title Gravity Daze as part of the unveiling of the Vita, being announced alongside titles such as Uncharted: Golden Abyss and LittleBigPlanet PS Vita. The game released in Japan on February 9, 2012. The game also released in Mainland Asia the following day. Following the game's release, updates were issued which addressed graphical and behavioral problems. Between March and April 2012, Gravity Rush received three DLC packs; each includes a new outfit for Kat, two side mission, and two challenge missions.

Sony continued to promote the title in the coming months, including launching a commercial featuring Japanese idol and actress Akari Hayami; the commercial featured Hayami performing the same gravity manipulation as Kat. Hayami filmed the commercial after finishing school one day, although she still had to change into a new school costume despite wearing a uniform. She enjoyed the filming despite having to be suspended from wires for several sequences; after shooting was completed, the staff gave her a Vita and copy of the game.

In the West, the game was originally announced under its Japanese title, later referred to under the title Gravity when it was shown at the Electronic Entertainment Expo 2011. Its English title Gravity Rush was revealed in August of that year. A game demo was released for the West in May 2012. The game released in North America on June 12, in Europe on June 15, and in Australia on June 14. One of the Japanese DLC packs was released as a pre-order bonus, with the other two being post-release paid DLC.

=== Gravity Rush Remastered ===
A high definition remaster for PlayStation 4 titled Gravity Rush Remastered was announced in September 2015; in addition to generally upgrading the title for the new console, it included all DLC released for the Vita version. The remaster was developed by Bluepoint Games, a studio which had earned a reputation for high-quality remasters such as The Ico & Shadow of the Colossus Collection. One of the main reasons for making the remaster was Toyama's wish to bring Gravity Rush to a wider audience. In addition to increasing the frame rate, the team were able to implement upgrades to the lighting, blur effects, draw distance and graphics engine. The character models were upgraded to the type used in the game's in-development sequel. The game released on December 10, 2015 in Japan; on February 9, 2016 in North America; and on February 10 in Europe. In Australia, the game released on February 3. Originally announced as a digital exclusive in North America, a limited physical edition was released exclusively through Amazon.com.

== Reception ==
Reception

Aggregate score
Aggregator	Score	
Aggregator	PS Vita	PS4
Metacritic	83/100	80/100

Review scores
Publication	Score	
Publication	PS Vita	PS4
Destructoid	6.5/10	8/10
Edge	8/10	N/A
Electronic Gaming Monthly	9.5/10	9/10
Eurogamer	9/10	N/A
Famitsu	38/40	N/A
Game Informer	8/10	N/A
GameSpot	6.5/10	7/10
GamesRadar+	4.5/5	4.5/5
IGN	7.5/10	7.5/10
PlayStation Official Magazine – UK	9/10	N/A

Gravity Rush received "generally favorable" reviews from critics, according to review aggregator website Metacritic.

Famitsu called the setting "outstanding"; while James Stephanie Sterling of Destructoid said that while Kat was an "adorable" protagonist, the story became nonsensical by the second half. Edge Magazine said the story provided "an engaging blend of eccentric nonsense", providing engaging scenarios for Kat while also praising her for breaking away from the physical superhero norms. Mollie L. Patterson Electronic Gaming Monthly praised Kat as a protagonist, while Christian Donlan of Eurogamer praised the writing, narrative, and the light tone adopted to tell the story. GamesRadar's Lucas Sullivan likewise enjoyed Kat as a protagonist and praised the cast, while Dan Ryckert of Game Informer felt that the story quickly lost focus and left the player wanting. GameSpot's Carolyn Petit felt that the game left too many mysteries unanswered. Greg Miller of IGN greatly enjoyed Kat's characterization and the opening segments of the story, but shared Petit's criticisms of the ending. Official PlayStation Magazine's Louise Blain called Kat a "perfect, charmingly reluctant heroine", but said that trying to describe the story would be like "trying to explain five seasons of Fringe in one sentence".

Speaking about the gameplay, Famitsu enjoyed the sensation of navigating the city, and praised the sense of freedom despite noting control issues. Sterling enjoyed exploring the city, but found the combat cumbersome and mission objectives repetitive. Edge likewise enjoyed exploring the city and positively compared the wall walking segments to climbing in Crackdown, and despite finding aspects of general gameplay and combat weak did not feel this brought down the experience too much. Patterson was positive overall, saying that while there were some elements that seemed underdeveloped, the overall experience was highly enjoyable and left her wanting more. Donlan called combat "simple but satisfying" and praised both the exploration and controls, while Ryckert enjoyed general exploration and combat while finding most side activities "basic". Petit enjoyed exploring the city, but found combat tedious and felt that the game's pacing was bogged down by uninteresting side activities. Sullivan found aspects of the control scheme took some time to master, but generally enjoyed the gameplay. Miller praised the gravity-based gameplay, but called some later missions frustrating. Blain praised the controls and found the gravity-based gameplay generally entertaining.

Both Famitsu and Edge praised the visuals; Edge positively called them a "[Studio] Ghibli-meets-[Charles] Dickens" stylistic blend. Sullivan likewise positively compared both the music and the visuals to the work of Studio Ghibli. His one warning was that it was not for people who suffered from motion sickness. Patterson praised the comic book artstyle, technical polish and the music, calling the latter "beautifully produced, [fitting] the fantastical setting" Both Donlan and Ryckert shared praise for the general aesthetic and structure of the game world. Petit praised the cutscenes' comic panel style and called the overall visuals "beautiful". Miller praised the soundtrack and visuals, but found the draw distance was too short. Blain positively noted the structure of the game's city environments, and praised the cutscenes.

During the 16th Annual D.I.C.E. Awards, the Academy of Interactive Arts & Sciences nominated Gravity Rush for "Handheld Game of the Year" and "Outstanding Achievement in Gameplay Engineering".

Reviewing the Asian English release of Remastered, Josh Tolentino of Destructoid praised the technical upgrade despite it still being clearly a Vita game, but criticized the lack of new content. Patterson, again reviewing for Electronic Gaming Monthly, echoed her praise for the original game and said that the upgrade to PS4 and the technical upgrades had made the experience even better for her. IGN's Marty Sliva said that the game's art style and smooth framerate allowed it to hold its own despite its age, but did not enjoy the motion control options. He called it the best way of experiencing Gravity Rush. Justin Towell of GamesRadar also gave the remastering praise, noting its graphics and improved sense of scale, but criticizing persistent camera difficulties experienced in the original. Oli Welsh, writing for Eurogamer, praised Remastered as standing among Bluepoint Studio's better efforts, praising its visual and technical upgrades despite the simplistic design dragging down the experience. GameSpot's Peter Brown likewise praised the upgrade to the graphics.

=== Sales ===
Upon its debut in Japan, Gravity Rush reached second place on game charts, selling over 43,400 units and coming in behind the PlayStation Portable (PSP) title Genso Suikoden: Tsumugareshi Hyakunen no Toki. While a strong start for the game, Vita sales had dropped from the previous week and were behind both the PSP and the Nintendo 3DS. By March, the game had sold over 100,000 units in the region, including both digital downloads and physical shipments. While no exact figures were given, sales in Mainland Asia were also said to be positive. In the United Kingdom, Gravity Rush reached ninth place in the "UK Individual Platforms Top 10" in its week of release. By August 2012, Gravity Rush had sold 200,000 units worldwide.

Gravity Rush Remastered reached tenth place in the charts with just over 25,000 units sold. While low compared to other debuts that week, its status as a remaster with few additions factored into this figure. A different sales estimate placed the game in thirteenth place with a little under 20,000 units. In the United Kingdom, the game failed to reach the top 20 best-selling titles of that week despite a lower price tag than other new releases, coming in at thirty-fourth place.

== Sequel ==
Keiichiro Toyama expressed interest in developing a sequel to Gravity Rush. After receiving the Tokyo Game Show 2012 TGS Game of the Year award, and receiving congratulations from fans Toyama said, "I'll do my best on the sequel". The sequel, titled Gravity Rush 2, was announced on Sony's TGS 2015 press conference and was released in the United States in 2017 for the PlayStation 4.

After the release Kat was added to the Everybody's Golf 6 roster as downloadable content. Kat, Raven, Alias, and Yunica were added as a costume pack for LittleBigPlanet 2, LittleBigPlanet PS Vita, and LittleBigPlanet Karting. Kat is a playable character in PlayStation All-Stars Battle Royale, available as downloadable content and made a cameo appearance in Astro's Playroom (2020).

== Film adaptation ==
A film adaptation directed by Anna Mastro and written by Emily Jerome was reported to be in development at PlayStation Productions and Scott Free Productions. In January 2024, concept footage for the film was released at CES 2024.
