= Keiichi Hara =

Japanese anime director (born 1959)

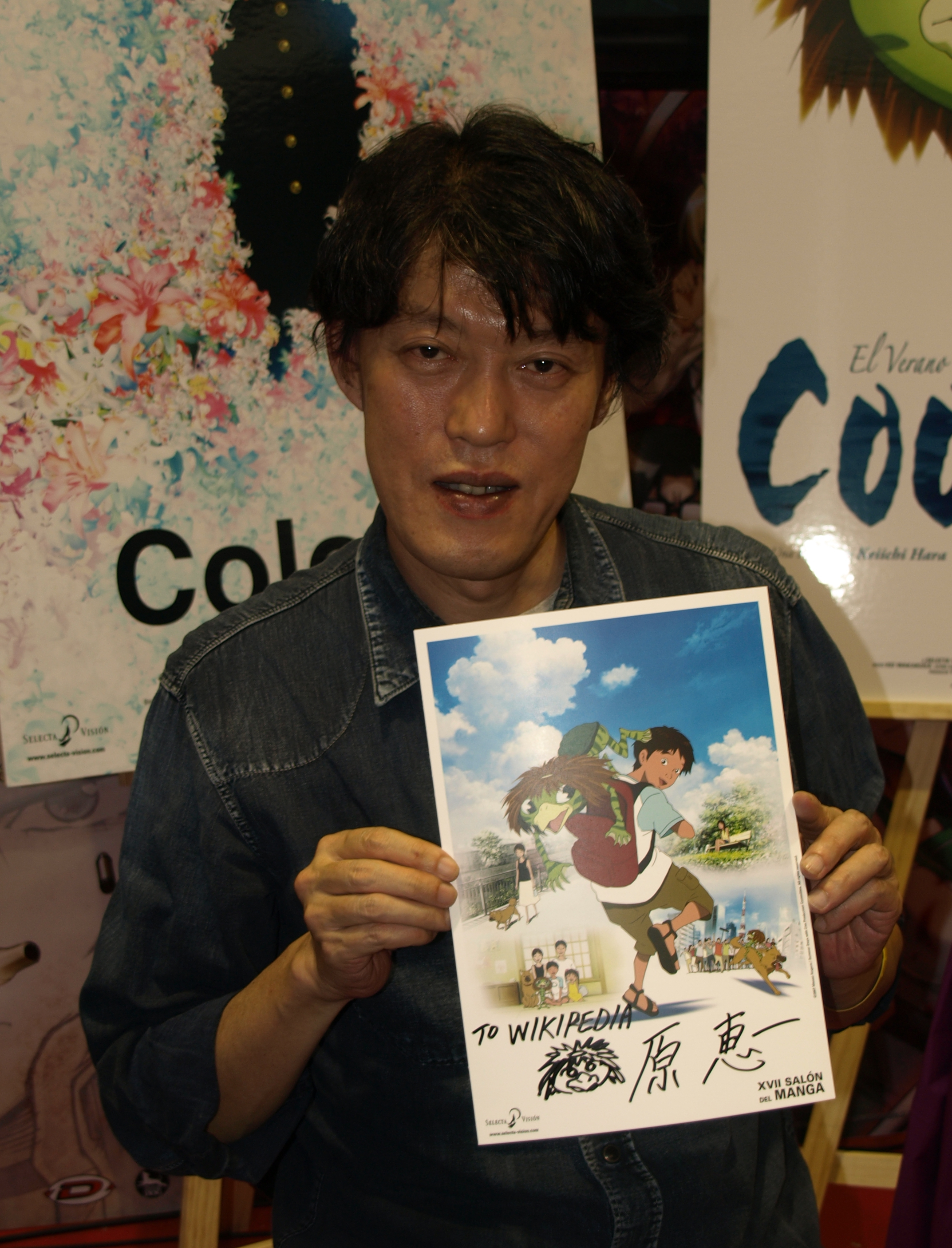
- Salón del Manga in Barcelona, Spain.
- Born: July 24, 1959 (age 67); Tatebayashi, Gunma, Japan
- Occupation: Film director

Keiichi Hara (原 恵一, Hara Keiichi; born July 24, 1959) is a Japanese director of animated films.

== Biography ==
What started Hara on his career as an animation creator was visiting an animation film company as part of his job hunting activities after graduating from Tokyo Designer Gakuin College (TDG). He recklessly left the tour, an act normally forbidden for visitors, and then begged an artistic director to give him a job. A few days later he returned with some continuity drawings he created, as requested. As a result, he was introduced to a commercial film studio.

After working at the studio for eighteen months, he joined Shin-Ei Animation on the recommendation of the president Keijiro Kurokawa. At Shin-Ei he began working on a TV series Kaibutsu-kun as a production manager, then was moved to Doraemon. There for the first time he took on the role of animation director. In working on Doraemon, he was influenced by the chief director Tsutomu Shibayama. Since Hara admired Fujiko Fujio, Doraemon's original author, he worked hard and became known for improving quality. He appeared in an animation magazine as a new director to look out for. After Obake no Q-Tarō and Doraemon, he was chosen as chief director of Esper Mami and worked for this TV series for two and a half years. When Esper Mami ended, he took a break for ten months. Then he returned by working on 21 emon. After 21 emon, he worked on Crayon Shin-chan. For "Shin-chan" he did direction and continuity both for the TV series and the movies, becoming director in October 1996. The 2001 Crayon Shin-chan movie Crayon Shin-chan: The Storm Called: The Adult Empire Strikes Back earned critical praise, and raised his profile. The following year's Crayon Shin-chan: The Storm Called: The Battle of the Warring States was commended by the Agency for Cultural Affairs.

As of 2012 Hara has begun shooting his first live-action film, Hajimari no Michi, which was released in June, 2013.

== Television ==
- 1983–1986: Doraemon (ドラえもん) Direction/Storyboard
- 1987–1989: Esper Mami (エスパー魔実) Director/Direction/Storyboard/Screenplay
- 1989: Chimpui (チンプイ) Director
- 1989: 21-emon (21エモン) Storyboard
- 1992–2004: Crayon Shin-chan (クレヨンしんちゃん) Director/Direction/Storyboard/Screenplay

== Filmography ==
- March 9, 1991: Dorami-chan: Wow, The Kid Gang of Bandits (アララ少年山賊団!) Director
- March 6, 1993: Dorami-chan: Hello, Dynosis Kids!! (ハロー恐竜キッズ!!) Director
- July 24, 1993: Crayon Shin-chan: Action Kamen vs Leotard Devil (クレヨンしんちゃん アクション仮面VSハイグレ魔王) Direction/Storyboard/screenplay
- April 23, 1994: Crayon Shin-chan: The Secret Treasure of Buri Buri Kingdom (クレヨンしんちゃん ブリブリ王国の秘宝) Direction/Storyboard/screenplay
- April 15, 1995: Crayon Shin-chan: Unkokusai's Ambition (クレヨンしんちゃん 雲黒斎の野望) Direction/Storyboard/screenplay
- April 13, 1996: Crayon Shin-chan: Adventure in Henderland (クレヨンしんちゃん ヘンダーランドの大冒険) Direction/Storyboard/screenplay
- April 19, 1997: Crayon Shin-chan: Pursuit of the Balls of Darkness (クレヨンしんちゃん 暗黒タマタマ大追跡) Director/Direction/Storyboard/screenplay
- April 18, 1998: Crayon Shin-chan: Blitzkrieg! Pig's Hoof's Secret Mission (クレヨンしんちゃん 電撃!ブタのヒヅメ大作戦) Director/Direction/Storyboard/screenplay
- April 17, 1999: Crayon Shin-chan: Explosion! The Hot Spring's Feel Good Final Battle/Kureshin Paradise! Made in Saitama (クレヨンしんちゃん 爆発!温泉わくわく大決戦 / クレしんパラダイス!メイド・イン・埼玉) Director/Direction/Storyboard/screenplay
- April 22, 2000: Crayon Shin-chan: The Storm Called The Jungle (クレヨンしんちゃん 嵐を呼ぶジャングル) Director/Direction/Storyboard/screenplay
- April 21, 2001: Crayon Shin-chan: The Storm Called: The Adult Empire Strikes Back (クレヨンしんちゃん 嵐を呼ぶ モーレツ!オトナ帝国の逆襲) Director/Direction/Storyboard/screenplay
- April 20, 2002: Crayon Shin-chan: The Storm Called: The Battle of the Warring States (クレヨンしんちゃん 嵐を呼ぶ アッパレ!戦国大合戦) Director/Direction/Storyboard/screenplay
- April 19, 2003: Crayon Shin-chan: The Storm Called: Yakiniku Road of Honor (クレヨンしんちゃん 嵐を呼ぶ 栄光のヤキニクロード) Direction/Storyboard/screenplay
- April 17, 2004: Crayon Shin-chan: The Storm Called: The Kasukabe Boys of the Evening Sun (クレヨンしんちゃん 嵐を呼ぶ!夕陽のカスカベボーイズ) Direction/Storyboard
- April 16, 2005: Crayon Shin-chan: The Legend Called Buri Buri 3 Minutes Charge (クレヨンしんちゃん 伝説を呼ぶブリブリ 3分ポッキリ大進撃) Storyboard
- July 28, 2007: Summer Days with Coo (河童のクゥと夏休み) Director/Direction/Storyboard/Screenplay
- August 21, 2010: Colorful (カラフル) Director
- June 1, 2013: Hajimari no Michi (はじまりのみち) Director/screenplay
- May 9, 2015: Miss Hokusai (百日紅) Director
- April 26, 2019: Birthday Wonderland (バースデー・ワンダーランド) Director
- December 23, 2022: Lonely Castle in the Mirror (かがみの孤城) Director

== Honours ==
- Medal with Purple Ribbon (2018)
