= Yuu Shimaka =

Japanese actor (1949–2019)

- 島香 裕
- Born: Yutaka Shimaka; May 6, 1949; Nagano Prefecture, Japan
- Died: July 28, 2019 (aged 70); Akishima, Tokyo, Japan
- Occupations: Actor; voice actor
- Agent: Production Aigumi

Yuu Shimaka (島香 裕, Shimaka Yū/Shimaka Yūtaka; May 6, 1949 – July 28, 2019) was a Japanese actor and voice actor affiliated with Production Baobab, and subsequently with Production Aigumi. He was the Japanese voice of the Disney character Goofy.

== Filmography ==
=== Film ===
- Kagemusha (1980) – Hara Jingorō #2

=== Television animation ===
1983

- Mirai Keisatsu Urashiman (Stinger Bear)

1984

- Special Armored Battalion Dorvack (Bob Floyd)

1985

- Obake no Q-tarō (Shōta-sensei)

1987

- Metal Armor Dragonar (Ben Rooner, Gol)
- Zillion (Nick)

1989

- Peter Pan no Boken (Sinistra Minion B)

1992

- Robin Hood no Daiboken (Bishop Hartford)
- Tekkaman Blade (Tekkaman Axe (Godard))
- Crayon Shin-chan (Picasso)
- YuYu Hakusho (Genbu, Gokumonki, Butajiri)

1993

- Doraemon (Jaian's father)

1995

- Mobile Suit Gundam Wing (Inspector Acht)

1998

- Cowboy Bebop (Piccaro Calvino)

1999

- Gokudo (Djinn)

2001

- Baki the Grappler (Toma Manuto)

2003

- Pecola (Mayor Papazoni)

2004

- Sgt. Frog (Kakukaku)

2006

- Code Geass (Ryoga Senba)
- Ergo Proxy (Barkley)
- Demashita! Powerpuff Girls Z (Ramen seller)

2008

- Stitch! (Santa Claus)

=== Original video animation ===
- Legend of the Galactic Heroes (1991) (Baumel)
- Bio Hunter (1995) (Boss)

=== Theatrical animation ===
- Space Adventure Cobra (1982)
- Galaxy Investigation 2100: Border Planet (1986) - Parish
- Bats and Terry (1987) - Sera
- Doraemon: The Record of Nobita's Parallel Visit to the West (1988) - Spectre
- The Five Star Stories (1989) - Man A
- Nadia: The Secret of Blue Water (1991) - Nautilus Crew
- Doraemon: Nobita and the Kingdom of Clouds (1992) - Earthling B
- Porco Rosso (1992) - Mamma Aiuto Gang
- Apfelland monogatari (1992) - General Der Wenze, Goltz
- Case Closed: Captured in Her Eyes (2000) - Detective Narasawa
- Crayon Shin-chan: The Storm Called: The Battle of the Warring States (2002) - The Samurai General
- Doraemon: Nobita in the Wan-Nyan Spacetime Odyssey (2004) - Policeman
- Crayon Shin-chan: The Storm Called: The Kasukabe Boys of the Evening Sun (2004) - Bar Master
- Summer Days with Coo (2007) - Swimming Teacher, TV Announcer
- Doraemon: Nobita and the Island of Miracles—Animal Adventure (2012) - Lock
- Kôdo Giasu: Hangyaku no Rurûshu I - Kôdô (2017) - Senba

=== Video games ===
- Crash Team Racing (1999) (Papu Papu)
- The Bouncer (2000) (Master Mikado)
- Kingdom Hearts series (2002-2019; 2020) (Goofy)
- Klonoa Beach Volleyball (2002) (Garlen)
- Ratchet & Clank: Going Commando (2003) (Abercrombie Fizzwidget)
- Skylanders: Spyro's Adventure (2011) (Master Eon)
- Skylanders: Giants (2012) (Master Eon)

=== Dubbing roles ===
==== Live-action ====
- Argo (John Chambers (John Goodman))
- Asteroid (Lloyd Morgan (Frank McRae))
- Back to the Future (1990 Fuji TV edition) (Biff Tannen (Thomas F. Wilson))
- Beyond the Sea (Stephen Blauner (John Goodman))
- Bulletproof (Bledsoe (Jeep Swenson))
- Caravan of Courage: An Ewok Adventure (Wicket W. Warrick)
- The Core (Dr. Edward Brazzelton (Delroy Lindo))
- The Crow (Gideon (Jon Polito))
- The Devil's Double (Saddam Hussein (Philip Quast))
- Die Another Day (Q (John Cleese))
- ER (Frank the Desk Clerk (Troy Evans))
- Ewoks: The Battle for Endor (Wicket W. Warrick)
- From Russia with Love (Morzeny (Walter Gotell))
- The Godfather (2001 DVD edition) (Philip Tattaglia (Victor Rendina), Luca Brasi (Lenny Montana))
- The Godfather Saga (Peter Clemenza (Richard S. Castellano))
- GoldenEye (Valentin Dmitrovich Zukovsky (Robbie Coltrane))
- GoldenEye (1999 TV Asahi edition) (Jack Wade (Joe Don Baker))
- Hard Target (1997 Fuji TV edition) (Douglas Binder (Chuck Pfarrer))
- Indiana Jones and the Last Crusade (1998 TV Asahi edition) (Sallah (John Rhys-Davies))
- Iron Will (Burton (Richard Riehle))
- Lemony Snicket's A Series of Unfortunate Events (Arthur Poe (Timothy Spall))
- Mad Max 2: The Road Warrior (1991 TBS edition) (Lord Humungus (Kjell Nilsson))
- Meet the Feebles (Bletch (Peter Vere-Jones))
- Miller's Crossing (Frankie (Mike Starr))
- Mission: Impossible (Luther Stickell (Ving Rhames))
- Mission: Impossible 2 (Luther Stickell (Ving Rhames))
- My Best Friend's Wedding (Joe O'Neal (M. Emmet Walsh))
- Powder (Deputy Harley Duncan (Brandon Smith))
- The Purple Rose of Cairo (Monk (Danny Aiello))
- Red Dwarf (Captain Hollister (Mac McDonald))
- Rollerball (Serokin (David Hemblen))
- See Spot Run (Sonny Talia (Paul Sorvino))
- Shaolin Soccer (Manager (Sun Chi Wing))
- Sleepless in Seattle (Jay Mathews (Rob Reiner))
- The Social Network (Larry Summers (Douglas Urbanski))
- The Sting (Lieutenant William Snyder (Charles Durning))
- Tomorrow Never Dies (Henry Gupta (Ricky Jay))
- Twin Peaks (Jacques Renault (Walter Olkewicz))
- The World Is Not Enough (R (John Cleese))
- The X-Files (Walter Skinner (Mitch Pileggi))

==== Animation ====
- Animaniacs (Flavio Hippo)
- The Brave Little Toaster (Plugsy)
- A Bug's Life (Heimlich)
- Cats Don't Dance (Woolie Mammoth)
- Chip 'n Dale Rescue Rangers (Fat Cat)
- Chuggington (Old Puffer Pete)
- Disney's House of Mouse (Goofy)
- Mickey Mouse Clubhouse (Goofy)
- DuckTales (Bouncer Beagle)
- An Extremely Goofy Movie (Goofy)
- Franny's Feet (Grandpa)
- G.I. Joe: A Real American Hero (Sgt. Slaughter)
- A Goofy Movie (Goofy)
- Goof Troop (Goofy)
- Jackie Chan Adventures (Lo Pei)
- Oliver and Company (Einstein)
- The Simpsons (Season 1-6, Chief Clancy Wiggum)
- Spider-Man and His Amazing Friends (Doctor Octopus)
- Spider-Man: The Animated Series (Doctor Octopus)
- Superman: The Animated Series (Granny Goodness)
- The Swan Princess (Speed)
- Tom and Jerry (Spike)
- The Transformers (Thundercracker)
- The Transformers: The Movie (Shockwave, Scourge, Devastator)
