= Crayon Shin-chan: Fierceness That Invites Storm! Me and the Space Princess =

- Directed by: Soichi Masui
- Music by: Toshiyuki Arakawa
- Production company: Shin-Ei Animation
- Distributed by: Toho
- Release date: April 14, 2012 (Japan)
- Running time: 111 minutes
- Country: Japan
- Language: Japanese
- Box office: $15,782,573

Crayon Shin-chan: Fierceness That Invites Storm! Me and the Space Princess (クレヨンしんちゃん 嵐を呼ぶ!オラと宇宙のプリンセス Crayon Shin-chan: Arashi o Yobu! Ora to Uchū no Princess), also known as Shin Chan, Me and the Space Princess, is a 2012 Japanese anime film. The film celebrates the 20th anniversary of Crayon Shin-chan anime. It is the 20th film based on the popular comedy manga and anime series Crayon Shin-chan.

The name of the theme song is: 'Shounen yo, uso wo tsuke!" (Boy, you'll lie). The film is set in midst of a rapid increase in cases of depression worldwide & decreasing fertility rates of Japan.

== Plot ==
Shinnosuke Nohara's family is visited by two mysterious men with elongated pierced earlobes in green clothing and hats bearing sunflower emblems (Himawari means "sunflower" in Japanese). They introduce themselves as aliens originating from a concealed planet of the Solar System named Himawari who manufacture 'happiness bubbles' in their planet out of the Sun's rays for their own sustenance and secretly export the excess bubbles to Earth, thereby preventing the outbreak of global pandemic of depression. However, recently the yield of 'happiness bubble's had decreased, leading to an alarming increase in depression among humans globally. They refer to an ancient prophecy circulating in their planet, predicting such a condition and stating that in order to restore the balance, the Himawari planet must be ruled by a child named Himawari born when all 7 planets of the Solar System align in straight line on one side of the Sun (a rare astronomical conjunction). The aliens identify Shinnosuke's infant sister Himawari as the prophesied child and ask for Shinnosuke the permission to take her away to their planet to be crowned princess (since he was the one who chose the name Himawari for his sister, thereby sealing the identity of the prophesied child). Shinnosuke, who had just fought with Himawari over a plate of custard, unhesitatingly signs over the agreement papers in a fit of rage, handing over Himawari to the aliens, in an attempt to get away from her. The Nohara family is taken to the Himawari planet through a UFO, where she is crowned princess with much pomp and celebration. However, after the ceremonies are over, Himawari is separated from her family by the aliens, who state that Himawari must stay with them until the planets again aligned in a straight line on one side of the Sun. When Misae and Hiroshi violently protest, they are sent back to the Earth on a UFO alongside Shinnosuke, as the family dog Shiro continued to remain by the side of Himawari. Distraught due to being separated from their daughter, Misae and Hiroshi fall into depression, and Shinnosuke is wrecked with guilt of having effectively banished his infant sister from their family over a trivial matter and decides to bring back Himawari at any cost. Shinnosuke's friends track down the earthly residence of the alien who had first approached the Nohara family. At his residence, they find a portal through which consignment of 'happiness bubbles' are transferred to the Earth.

The Noharas reach the Himawari planet through that portal, overcoming mental challenges that draws some visual concepts from the Phantom Zone used in the Superman series. After reaching the Himawari planet, Shinnosuke and his parents fight off the alien attendants of Himawari to reach the chamber of the alien king. As Shin-chan successfully reclaims Himawari and Shiro, after stating that he is ashamed of his rash actions and would like to cancel the previous agreement, the planets again align in a straight line on one side of the Sun. This causes an increase in Sun's emittance, which in turn not only restores, but doubles the production of 'happiness bubble's. The alien king then mentions that the aforementioned prophecy stated that if the planets again aligned on one side of the Sun after the arrival of Himawari, then Himawari planet would face either doom or prosperity, but due to the combined presence of Shinnosuke and Himawari in the planet, doom had been avoided and he consents to send Himawari back to Earth with her parents. The film ends with Shinnosuke, while bonding with Himawari at the UFO en-route to Earth, hears Himawari (who can't speak yet), addressing him as 'brother'.

== Cast ==
- Shinnosuke Nohara: Akiko Yajima
- Misae Nohara: Miki Narahashi
- Hiroshi Nohara: Keiji Fujiwara
- Himawari Nohara: Satomi Kōrogi
- Toru Kazama / Shiro: Mari Mashiba
- Nene Sakurada: Tamao Hayashi
- Masao Sato: Teiyū Ichiryūsai
- Bo-chan: Chie Satō
- Principal: Rokurō Naya
- Miss Yoshinaga: Halevi Terada
- Miss Matsuzaka: Michie Tomizawa
- Teacher Ageo: Kotono Mitsuishi
- Mitch Motoko: Makoto Ohmoto
- Yoshirin: Daisuke Sakaguchi

== International release ==
This movie was released in India on Hungama TV on 22 March 2014 as Shin Chan The Movie Himawari Banegi Rajkumari.
