= Kinema Junpo =

Japanese film magazine

Kinema Junpo キネマ旬報

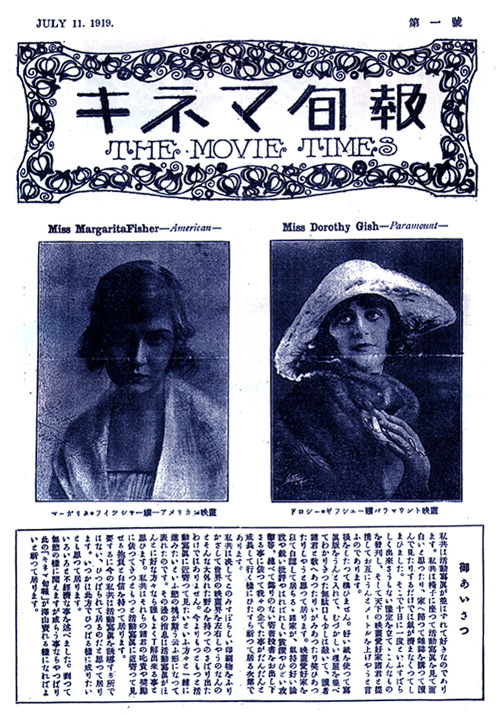
- Cover of the first issue of Kinema Junpo, dated July 11, 1919
- Categories: Film
- Frequency: Semimonthly
- Publisher: Masanobu Shimizu (清水勝之)
- Founder: Saburō Tanaka
- First issue: July 11, 1919; 106 years ago
- Company: Kinema Junposha KK
- Country: Japan
- Based in: Minato-ku, Tokyo
- Language: Japanese
- Website: Official website

Kinema Junpo (キネマ旬報, Kinema Junpō; lit. 'Cinema News Released Every Ten Days'), commonly called Kinejun (キネ旬), is Japan's oldest film magazine and began publication in July 1919. It was first published three times a month, using the Japanese Jun (旬) system of dividing months into three parts, but the postwar Kinema Junpō has been published twice a month.

The magazine was founded by a group of four students, including Saburō Tanaka, at the Tokyo Institute of Technology (Tokyo Technical High School at the time). In that first month, it was published three times on days with a "1" in them. These first three issues were printed on art paper and had four pages each. Kinejun initially specialized in covering foreign films, in part because its writers sided with the principles of the Pure Film Movement and strongly criticized Japanese cinema. It later expanded coverage to films released in Japan. While long emphasizing film criticism, it has also served as a trade journal, reporting on the film industry in Japan and announcing new films and trends.

After their building was destroyed in the Great Kantō earthquake in September 1923, the Kinejun offices were moved to the city of Ashiya in the Hanshin area of Japan, though the main offices are now back in Tokyo.

The Kinema Junpo Best Ten awards began in 1924, their Best Ten lists are considered iconic and prestigious. Initially launched as accolades for foreign films, awards for Japanese films were established in 1926 and readers' choice awards were introduced in 1972.

== Kinema Junpo Best Ten ==
=== Japanese Films of All Time (2009 list) ===
#	Film	Year
1	Tokyo Story	1953
2	Seven Samurai	1954
3	Floating Clouds	1955
4	Sun in the Last Days of the Shogunate	1957
5	Battles Without Honor and Humanity	1973
6	Twenty-Four Eyes	1954
7	Rashomon	1950
7	The Million Ryo Pot	1935
7	The Man Who Stole the Sun	1979
10	The Family Game	1983
10	Stray Dog	1949
10	Typhoon Club	1985

=== Non-Japanese Films of All Time (2009 list) ===
#	Film	Year
1	The Godfather	1972
2	West Side Story	1961
2	Taxi Driver	1976
4	The Third Man	1949
5	Breathless	1960
5	The Wild Bunch	1969
7	2001: A Space Odyssey	1968
8	Roman Holiday	1953
8	Blade Runner	1982
10	Stagecoach	1939
10	Children of Paradise	1945
10	La Strada	1954
10	Vertigo	1958
10	Lawrence of Arabia	1962
10	The Conformist	1970
10	Apocalypse Now	1979
10	The South	1983
10	Gran Torino	2008

=== Japanese Animated Films of All Time (2009 list) ===
#	Film	Year
1	The Castle of Cagliostro	1979
2	Nausicaä of the Valley of the Wind	1984
3	My Neighbor Totoro	1988
4	Crayon Shin-chan: The Storm Called: The Adult Empire Strikes Back	2001
5	Akira	1988
6	The Wonderful World of Puss 'n Boots	1969
7	The Tale of the White Serpent	1958
7	Hols: Prince of the Sun	1968
7	Urusei Yatsura 2: Beautiful Dreamer	1984
10	Castle in the Sky	1986
10	Grave of the Fireflies	1988
10	Summer Days with Coo	2007
10	Summer Wars	2009

=== Non-Japanese Animated Films of All Time (2010 list) ===
#	Film	Year
1	Fantasia	1940
2	The Nightmare Before Christmas	1993
3	Snow White and the Seven Dwarfs	1937
4	Le Roi et l'oiseau	1980
5	Hedgehog in the Fog	1975
6	Mr. Bug Goes to Town	1941
7	Toy Story	1995
8	Up	2009
8	The Man Who Planted Trees	1987
10	The Iron Giant	1999
10	The Wrong Trousers	1993

=== Movie star and Director of the 20th century ===
==== Japanese ====
#	Actor	#	Actress	#	Director
1.	Toshiro Mifune (1920-1997)	1.	Setsuko Hara (1920-2015)	1.	Akira Kurosawa (1910-1998)
2.	Yujiro Ishihara (1934-1987)	2.	Sayuri Yoshinaga (1945-)	2.	Yasujirō Ozu (1903-1963)
3.	Masayuki Mori (1911-1973)	3.	Machiko Kyō (1924-2019)	3.	Kenji Mizoguchi (1898-1956)
4.	Ken Takakura (1931-2014)	4.	Hideko Takamine (1924-2010)	4.	Keisuke Kinoshita (1912-1998)
5.	Chishū Ryū (1904-1993)	5.	Kinuyo Tanaka (1909-1977)	5.	Mikio Naruse (1905-1969)
6.	Ichikawa Raizō VIII (1931-1969)	6.	Isuzu Yamada (1917-2012)	6.	Yoji Yamada (1931-)
7.	Tsumasaburō Bandō (1901-1953)	7.	Masako Natsume (1957-1985)	7.	Kinji Fukasaku (1930-2003)
7.	Shintaro Katsu (1931-1997)	8.	Keiko Kishi (1932-)	7.	Kon Ichikawa (1915-2008)
9.	Kiyoshi Atsumi (1928-1996)	8.	Ayako Wakao (1933-)	7.	Nagisa Oshima (1932-2013)
9.	Hisaya Morishige (1913-2009)	10.	Sumiko Fuji (1945-)	7.	Tomu Uchida (1898-1970)
9.	Yorozuya Kinnosuke (1932-1997)	10.	Shima Iwashita(1941-)	11.	Hayao Miyazaki(1941-)

==== Foreign ====
#	Actor	#	Actress	#	Director
1.	Gary Cooper (1901–1961)	1.	Audrey Hepburn (1929–1993)	1.	Alfred Hitchcock (1899–1980)
2.	Charlie Chaplin (1889–1977)	2.	Marilyn Monroe (1926–1962)	2.	Federico Fellini (1920–1993)
2.	John Wayne (1907–1979)	3.	Ingrid Bergman (1915–1982)	3.	John Ford (1894–1973)
4.	Marlon Brando (1924–2004)	4.	Vivien Leigh (1913–1967)	4.	Charlie Chaplin (1889–1977)
4.	Alain Delon (1935–2024)	5.	Marlene Dietrich (1901–1992)	4.	Jean-Luc Godard (1930–2022)
4.	Jean Gabin (1904–1976)	6.	Grace Kelly (1929–1982)	4.	Steven Spielberg (1946-)
7.	Humphrey Bogart (1899–1957)	7.	Françoise Arnoul (1931–2021)	4.	Billy Wilder (1906–2002)
7.	Steve McQueen (1930–1980)	7.	Bette Davis (1908–1989)	8.	Luchino Visconti (1906–1976)
9.	Sean Connery (1930–2020)	7.	Jodie Foster (1962-)	9.	Stanley Kubrick (1928–1999)
9.	Paul Newman (1925–2008)	7.	Greta Garbo (1905–1990)	10.	Luis Buñuel (1900–1983)
		7.	Anna Karina (1940–2019)		
		7.	Jeanne Moreau (1928–2017)		
		7.	Romy Schneider (1938–1982)		
		7.	Elizabeth Taylor (1932–2011)		

- List of winners each year:

== Annual award categories ==
These are the categories of awards:

- Best Japanese Director
- Best Screenplay
- Best Leading Actress
- Best Leading Actor
- Best Supporting Actress
- Best Supporting Actor
- Best Newcomer Actress
- Best Newcomer Actor
- Best Foreign Director
- Readers' Choice Best Japanese Director
- Readers' Choice Best Foreign Director
- Documentary Best One
- Japanese Film Best Ten
- Foreign Film Best Ten
- Readers' Choice Japanese Film Best Ten
- Readers' Choice Foreign Film Best Ten
