= Crayon Shin-chan: Burst Serving! Kung Fu Boys ~Ramen Rebellion~ =

- Film poster
- Directed by: Wataru Takahashi
- Written by: Kimiko Ueno
- Based on: Crayon Shin-chan by Yoshito Usui
- Starring: Akiko Yajima; Miki Narahashi; Toshiyuki Morikawa; Satomi Korogi; Mari Mashiba; Tamao Hayashi; Teiyū Ichiryūsai; Chie Sato; Megumi Han; Tsutomu Sekine
- Music by: Toshiyuki Arakawa; Kow Otani
- Production company: Shin-Ei Animation
- Distributed by: Toho
- Release date: April 13, 2018
- Running time: 104 minutes
- Country: Japan
- Language: Japanese
- Box office: $14.8 million

Crayon Shin-chan: Burst Serving! Kung Fu Boys ~Ramen Rebellion~ (映画クレヨンしんちゃん 爆盛！カンフーボーイズ ～拉麺大乱～, Kureyon Shinchan: Bakumori! Kanfū Bōizu ~Rāmen Tairan~) is a 2018 Japanese anime film produced by Shin-Ei Animation. It is the 26th film of the popular comedy manga and anime series Crayon Shin-chan. The director of this movie is Wataru Takahashi who also directed the 2014 movie Crayon Shin-chan: Serious Battle! Robot Dad Strikes Back and 2016 movie Crayon Shin-chan: Fast Asleep! Dreaming World Big Assault!. The screenplay is written by Kimiko Ueno who also wrote for the 2015 movie Crayon Shin-chan: My Moving Story! Cactus Large Attack!.

This is final Crayon Shin-chan film to feature Akiko Yajima as Shinnosuke Nohara before she retired on June 29, 2018.

== Plot ==
In Kasukabe, Shinnouske's father, was watching TV, in which it was shown that a man after eating ramen became rageful. In his school, when Shin chan and his friends were practicing for the school sports day dance, they saw that their friend Masao was being bullied by Hitoshi and Terenobou from the Rose group class. Masao, usually being a cry-baby, instead becomes confident and strong, through which he is able to defend himself.

Finding Masao's behavior weird, Shin chan and his friends decide to follow. Masao goes through a street, which leads to a China-town. In that town, they found Masao practicing by balancing a water bowl on his head. When Shin chan shouted, he told them that he was learning the Chinese Martial arts named Kung Fu. Then they met the master and Ran chan (who was masters first student). They found that Shin chan was very soft to learn Kung Fu and wanted him to learn it to. Suddenly a land thug from Black Panda ramen shop came, asking for their land. Along with him came the Kung Fu experts, the Sausage brothers. But master defeated them very easily after which the children agreed to learn Kung Fu.

The next day, the learnt the legend of Kung Fu art, the Punni-Punni flow. In the legend, it was said that an unknown martial artist practiced nine stages of Kung Fu, through which he attained a magical strength at the Punni-Punni mainland and stopped a great war and peace. The children were told that they had to practice these nine steps in order to come alongside Ran chan to Punni-Punni mainland. Soon Shinnouske was able complete level very quickly, which Masao sad as he failed at the first level itself. Meanwhile, the people who are Black Panda ramen became very rageful.

The Black Panda ramen shops leader Don Panpan met the master and paralyzed him, due to which the master always says "panties to look". The children return to Chinatown and find out that everyone has left it due to Black Panda ramen people. Meanwhile, Shin-chan's younger sister Himawari eats the Black Panda ramen, causing to become very rageful and black bags around her eyes just like a Panda. To make Himawari normal Shin chan and his friends enter the Black Panda ramen factory to find a medicine to cure for Himawari. They record everything in Kazama's phone. However they are discovered. Masao gets caught due to being very stiff in his Kung Fu moves and blurts about everything, including the recording in the phone. They have exchange deal on which Kazama will give in return for Masao's safety.

Suddenly, Ran chan appears and helps them escape and they leave for Shin Chan's house, where Shin chan passes all the levels making him capable to accompany Ran chan to Punni-Punni mainland which is located somewhere in China. Masao refuses to go, feeling that he is fit for nothing and leaves tearfully. Suddenly they are attacked by Nohara family's neighbors, who have become members of the Black Panda ramen branch. They escape as master sacrifices himself. Ran chan vows to achieve the magic in the Punni-Punni mainland. They all leave for China except for Shin Chan's friends. There they find the area and meet the Punni-Punni fairy, who asks them questions and eventually Shin chan wins it, but Ran chan loses.

The fairy tells Ran chan when she questions why he lost that her soul is not gentle because of which he will be unable to bear the strength of the magic. But when Shin chan refuses to drink the potion through which he can attain the magic, Ran chan drinks it up. They return to Kasukabe, and defeat Don Panpan. But due to not having a gentle soul, Ran chan becomes an evil who possess the ability to make everything peaceful. This greatly affects Kasukabe. Soon Shin chan and his friends unite with Masao and team up as the Kasukabe defence group to defeat Ran chan. They use their Jenkaa dance which creates an effect making everyone dance along with it. This makes everyone come normal. Ran chan, who also becomes normal, goes on a world tour on the master's orders. The children bid her goodbye. The movie ends with a song and a picture explaining the full story.

== Cast ==
- Akiko Yajima as Shinnosuke Nohara
- Miki Narahashi as Misae Nohara
- Toshiyuki Morikawa as Hiroshi Nohara
- Satomi Korogi as Himawari Nohara
- Mari Mashiba as Toru Kazama and Shiro
- Tamao Hayashi as Nene Sakurada
- Teiyū Ichiryūsai as Masao Satou
- Chie Sato as Bo-chan
- Daisuke Sakaguchi as Yoshirin
- Makiko Ohmoto as Micchi

Guests

- Tsutomu Sekine
- Megumi Han
- Ryōtarō Okiayu
- Yū Mizushima
- Kōsei Hirota
- Mitsuaki Madono
- Anri Katsu
- Miyazon as Miya Zon

== Music ==
=== Ending Theme Song ===
- Xiao Yi Xiao (笑一笑 〜シャオイーシャオ！〜, Smile)
  - Singer: Momoiro Clover Z

== Box office ==
The Anime Film which released on April 13 ranked No. 12 in Highest Grossing film in Japan Box Office for 1st Half of 2018 with Gross Total of US$14.7 million and #27 for Year 2018.

== Home media ==
The film was listed in Top-Selling Animation DVDs in 2019 with overall estimated sales of 5,042.

The Film aired on TV Asahi on Sunday, April 14 at 10:00 a.m. and earned a 3.1% rating.

== International release ==
It aired in India on June 22, 2024, on Sony YAY! as Shin-chan Movie: Bakumori! Kung Fu Boys.

== See also ==
- Yoshito Usui
