= Crayon Shin-chan: The Storm Called: The Adult Empire Strikes Back =

2001 film by Keiichi Hara

- Official Movie Poster
- Kanji: クレヨンしんちゃん 嵐を呼ぶ モーレツ！オトナ帝国の逆襲
- Revised Hepburn: Kureyon Shinchan: Arashi o Yobu: Mōretsu! Otona Teikoku no Gyakushū
- Directed by: Keiichi Hara
- Written by: Keiichi Hara
- Based on: Shin Chan by Yoshito Usui
- Starring: Akiko Yajima; Keiji Fujiwara; Miki Narahashi; Satomi Kōrogi; Mari Mashiba; Tamao Hayashi; Teiyū Ichiryūsai; Chie Satō; Ai Kobayashi; Masane Tsukayama
- Production company: Shin-Ei Animation
- Release date: April 21, 2001
- Running time: 90 minutes
- Country: Japan
- Language: Japanese
- Box office: $10,392,896

Crayon Shin-chan: The Storm Called: The Adult Empire Strikes Back (クレヨンしんちゃん 嵐を呼ぶ モーレツ！オトナ帝国の逆襲, Kureyon Shinchan: Arashi o Yobu: Mōretsu! Otona Teikoku no Gyakushū?) is a Japanese animated film released on April 21, 2001. It is the ninth installment of the Crayon Shin-chan series. The name is a reference to The Empire Strikes Back. It was released as Crayon Shinchan The Movie: Counter Attacking the Adult's Empire with English subtitles on VCD and DVD by PMP Entertainment.

The film tells the story of Shin-chan, who must rescue the adults of Kasukabe when they mysteriously abandon their responsibilities to relive their youth at the new 20th-century expo.

Since its release, the film has received widespread critical acclaim, with praise given to the animation, screenplay, direction, music, mix of comedy and drama, emotional weight and the approach of themes such as reminiscence, nostalgia, and past vs future. The "Hiroshi's Reminiscence" scene has been compared to the famous beginning of Up.

The film is considered by critics to be the best film in the series, one of the greatest animated films of all time, and even one of the best Japanese films of all time by publications such as Kinema Junpo.

== Plot ==
Shinnosuke and his family attend a convention that dates back to the 20th century. Even though adults like Hiroshi and Misae are filled with fascination and excitement, children like Shinnosuke and Himawari are disinterested and concerned for their parents' nostalgia. As this goes on, Ken and Chaco (the owners of the convention) discuss plans to "rid of the smell of the 21st century." This takes into effect during the night as Hiroshi and Misae suddenly sleep for the night.

The next morning, Shinnosuke finds that Hiroshi and Misae have become very crude and irresponsible. After angrily leaving the house for kindergarten, Shinnosuke (taking Himawari along with him) finds that every adult is acting childlike; this even extends to the kindergarten he goes to. Suddenly, trucks appear and take every adult (including Nanako) to a place where only the 20th century exists. Shinnosuke and his friends meet at his house to discuss the events that occurred in their hometown.

They discover that children are not only trying to survive without their parents, but various media are reverting to the 20th century; this is only made worse when the electricity shuts down. Later, trucks appear and several workers claim that they are there to pick up every child and reunite them with their parents. Shinnosuke and his friends realize this is a trap, and that they heard they will come back to capture other stray children. Shinnosuke, Himawari, his friends Kazama, Nene, Masao, Bo and his dog Shiro take refuge in a department store.

As the hunt for more children begins, Shinnosuke and his friends realize that they overslept and must leave immediately. After failing to hide from the henchmen (including several adults that Shinnosuke knows), Shinnosuke, his friends, and what is left of his family go on the run. Several hi-jinks later, they decide to steal the principal's bus to escape from the adults. Accidentally going to the land of the 20th century, Shinnosuke and everyone in the bus decide to find and confront their parents.

After crashing the bus inside the building, Shin's friends are captured; however, Shinnosuke, Himawari, and Shiro are able to escape. Finding the door where Hiroshi is reliving his childhood, Shinnosuke found out that the smell of the 20th century is affecting the adults; as such Shinnosuke uses his father's foot odor to neutralize the 20th smell that is affecting Hiroshi.

Realizing that the hardships of growing older gave him the family he loves, Hiroshi is successfully brought back to reality. After finding Misae, Ken decides to take Shinnosuke and his reunited family to the source of the 20th century. He explains that his machine will launch the smell of the 20th century, thanks to the added scent of the people living in the false 20th century. Because of the situation at hand, Hiroshi, Shinnosuke, Misae, Himawari, and Shiro must stop the evil plan before it is too late. One by one, Shin's family distracts the henchmen to buy him time. With the future at stake, Shinnosuke desperately dashes to the control room.

Though Shinnosuke failed to reach the control room before Ken and Chaco, the actions of him and his family made those living in the 20th century realize that they want to go back to the future. As a result, the smell of the 20th century disappears. Even though they accept defeat, Ken and Chaco are unable to accept the future; therefore, they attempt suicide at the top of the building. But as they attempt the act, they are halted by a pigeon protecting its family. With their suicidal actions stopped, Ken and Chaco realize that they too must find a place to live in the 21st century. Several children and adults are reunited and sent back to their hometown. Shinnosuke and his family return home where the future awaits.

== Cast ==
- Akiko Yajima as Shinnosuke Nohara
- Keiji Fujiwara as Hiroshi Nohara
  - Yūko Mita as Child Hiroshi
- Miki Narahashi as Misae Nohara
- Satomi Kōrogi as Himawari Nohara
- Masane Tsukayama as Ken
- Ai Kobayashi as Chaco
- Rokurō Naya as Bunta Takakura (Principal)
- Mari Mashiba as Toru Kazama and Shiro
- Tamao Hayashi as Nene Sakurada
- Teiyū Ichiryūsai as Masao Sato
- Chie Satō as Bo Suzuki
- Nobutoshi Canna as Hero Sun
- Chafurin as Razaya Dan (News Reporter)
- Ginzō Matsuo as Ginnosuke Nohara, Hiroshi's father and paternal grandfather of Shinnosuke and Himawari
- Chie Kitagawa as Tsuru Nohara, Hiroshi's mother and paternal grandmother of Shinnosuke and Himawari

== Critical reception ==
In Japan and South Korea, where Crayon Shin-Chan is one of the most well-recognized animes of all time, the film consistently ranks as not only one of the best Crayon Shin-Chan movies, but one of the best animated films ever, even ranking 4th in Kinema Junpo's Top Anime Films of All Time list (The Highest Ranked Film not directed by Hayao Miyazaki), and 103rd in their Top Japanese Films of All Time list. It is also one of only three Japanese films to ever rank 1st in Eiga Hihou's annual top 10 lists. It also ranked 8th in the 23rd Yokohama Film Festival Top 10 Japanese Films. It was the 3rd highest ranked non-Ghibli film ranked by the Japanese audience in the 100 Selected Media Arts in Japan (日本のメディア芸術100選) Anime Section as well.

Writer Kazuki Nakashima of Gurren Lagann and Kill la Kill has praised this and the 10th Crayon Shin-Chan film, and later went on to write the 22nd Shin-Chan film.

In particular, the film's themes of reminiscence, nostalgia, and past vs future have been widely praised, especially the execution of the idea of the adults adhering to the nostalgia of the 20th century contrasting with the children growing up in the dawning 21st century. The scene of Hiroshi's reminiscence, in particular, is considered to be one of the greatest scenes in animation in the countries the film screened in, and has been compared to Up's opening sequence for its emotional impact even on adults.

== Honors ==
- 日本のメディア芸術100選 Anime Section Rank #19
- Kinema Junpo's Top Anime Films of All Time #4
- Kinema Junpo's Top Japanese Films of All Time #103
- The movie was voted as the best Crayon Shin-chan movie on the 20th anniversary of the series, in an award ceremony called "Bakademy Awards" in 2012.

== See also ==
- Shōwa nostalgia
