= Akiko Yajima =

Japanese voice actress (born 1967)

- 矢島 晶子
- Born: May 4, 1967 (age 59); Kashiwazaki, Niigata, Japan
- Other names: Akko (あっこ); Aki Uechi (うえち あき)
- Occupation: Voice actress
- Years active: 1988–present
- Agent: Across Entertainment

Akiko Yajima (矢島 晶子, Yajima Akiko; May 4, 1967) is a Japanese voice actress from Kashiwazaki, Niigata. Her best-known role is as the titular character Shinnosuke Nohara in the long-running television anime series Crayon Shin-chan. She also voices Mipple in the original Futari wa Pretty Cure, Sally Yoshinaga in The Brave Express Might Gaine, Paffy Pafuricia in Haō Taikei Ryū Knight, Relena Peacecraft in Mobile Suit Gundam Wing, Ayumi Himekawa in Glass Mask, Riku and Diva in Blood+, Longlong in Shizuku-chan and Kohaku in Inuyasha. In video games, she voices Annie Barrs in Tales of series, and has dubbed for Anakin Skywalker and Harry Potter in some of the live-action films and video games. She is also known for being the voice of Spyro the Dragon in the Spyro video games, which she retired from in 2000. On June 29, 2018, Akiko Yajima retired from her career as Shinnosuke Nohara's voice actress and newly announced that Yumiko Kobayashi took over the role as Shinnosuke Nohara.

On August 1, 2024, Across Entertainment announced that Yajima has joined the agency under the name Aki Uechi (うえち あき, Uechi Aki). She reverted to her real name on April 1, 2025.

== Filmography ==
=== Anime ===
List of voice performances in anime
Year	Title	Role	Notes	Source
1989	Idol Densetsu Eriko	Eriko Tamura	Debut major role	
1989	Jungle Book Shōnen Mowgli	Meshua		
1990	Mashin Hero Wataru 2	Reina レイナ		
1990	Like the Clouds, Like the Wind			
1990	NG Knight Lamune & 40	Yorurun		
1990	Magical Angel Sweet Mint	Claire クレア		
1990	Lemon Angel	Medaka Ogawa	Young Jump version, OVA series	
1991	Jankenman	Guuyan		
1991	Chiisana Obake Acchi, Kocchi, Socchi	Kocchi		
1991	Dragon Knight	Lala	OVA	
1992	Hana no Mahōtsukai Mary Bell	Vivian, Miki		
1992	Tekkaman Blade	Boy		
1992	Adventures of Puss-in-Boots ファンタジーアドベンチャー 長靴をはいた猫の冒険	The Little Mermaid		
1992	Cooking Papa	Ohara Etsuko 小原えつ子		
1992–2018	Crayon Shin-chan	Shinnosuke "Shin-chan" Nohara		
1992	Licca-chan	Aki アキ	OVA	
1992	Kobo-chan	Nohara Satoshi 野原サトシ		
1993	The Brave Express Might Gaine	Sally Yoshinaga	家計を支えるためにアルバイトに精を出す少女。	
1994	Tico of the Seven Seas	Topia		
1994	Pretty Soldier Sailor Moon S	Tamasaburou, Shinnosuke Nohara	Ep. 104	
1994–95	Haō Taikei Ryū Knight	Paffy Pafuricia		
1994	Yamato Takeru	Kaon カオン		
1994	Butt Attack Punisher Girl Gautaman 臀撃おしおき娘ゴータマン ゴータマン誕生編	Hibari Misora	OVA	
1994	Tenshi Nanka Ja Nai	Yuko Mamiya	OVA	
1994	Mahōjin Guru Guru	Ardenberg		
1994	Butt Attack Punisher Girl Gautaman R	Hibari Misora	OVA	
1995	Jura Tripper	Martina		
1995	Tenchi Universe	Ken-Ohki		
1995	Mobile Suit Gundam Wing	Relena Peacecraft	Also Endless Waltz	
1995	Bonobono	Min Min		
1995	Bear's Phu Taro クマのプー太郎	Happiness rabbit しあわせウサギ	幸せ探して30年	
1995	Mojacko	Hyun ヒュン		
1995	Neon Genesis Evangelion	Various characters		
1995	Galaxy Fräulein Yuna	Erika Kousaka	OVA	
1996–98	Bakusō Kyōdai Let's & Go!!	Chīko Mikuni, Josephine Goodwin		
1996	Rurouni Kenshin	Amakusa Shōgo (young)		
1996	First Human Gon	Prince of the stars 星の王子		
1996	VS Knight Ramune & 40 Fire	BQ		
1996	Idol Janshi Suchie-Pai 2	Shiho Katagiri	OVA	
1996	Kochira Katsushika-ku Kameari Kōen-mae Hashutsujo	Keiko Kirigaya 霧ヶ谷景子		
1996	Martian Successor Nadesico	Sayuri Terasaki		
1996	Raideen the Superior	Takeru		
1996–97	Galaxy Fräulein Yuna: The Abyssal Fairy	Erika Kousaka	OVA series	
1997	Vampire Hunter: The Animated Series	Anita	OVA series	
1997	Tenchi in Tokyo	Yugi		
1997	Revolutionary Girl Utena	Mitsuru Tsuwabuki		
1997	The Kindaichi Case Files	Various characters		
1997	Flame of Recca	Kurenai		
1997	Battle Athletes Victory	Anna Respighi		
1997	Berserk	Rickert, Elise		
1998	Kocchi Muite! Miiko	Mamoru Yamada		
1998	Fushigi Mahō Fan Fan Pharmacy	Niboshi, Natsumi, Puka		
1998	Princess Nine	Koharu Hotta		
1998	Sentimental Journey	Kasumi Imanaka	Ep. 7	
1998	DT Eightron	Dolly		
1998	Orphen	Maris		
1998	Geobreeders	Takami Sakuragi	OVA	
1999	Burst Ball Barrage!! Super B-Daman	Koichi Kuroba 黒羽光一		
1999	Kamikaze Kaito Jeanne	Black Angel Access Time, Sakura Todaiji		
1999	Tournament of the Gods	Craiya	OVA Adult	
1999	Kyorochan	Kitakaze kanka 北風かんたくん		
1999	Kakyūsei	Hikari Akimoto	OVA Adult, Pink Pineapple version	
1999–2000	Blue Submarine No. 6	Daughter of the Beast	OVA ep 3, 4	
1999	Omishi Magical Theater: Risky Safety	Yuya Fukami		
1999	Seraphim Call	Chiami Ouse		
1999	Excel Saga	Sara Cosette		
1999	The Big O	R. Dorothy Wayneright	少女型アンドロイド	
1999	Shukan Storyland	Chrysanthemum お菊		
2000	Gensomaden Saiyuki	Seifuku / Meigetsu 清風・明月		
2000	Ceres, The Celestial Legend	Miori Sahara	Ep. 15-16	
2000	Argento Soma	A clover クローカ		
2000	Inuyasha	Kohaku, Yura of the Hair		
2000	Ghost Stories	Boy (sometimes)		
2000	Saving Our Fragile Earth: Unico Special	Unico		
2000	Hiwou War Chronicles	Mayu		
2001	The Family's Defensive Alliance	Ellen Shiratori		
2001	Haré+Guu	It is my sister アレ（妹）		
2001	Rune Soldier	Aila		
2001	Prétear	Mannen	冷気のリーフェナイツ	
2001	Figure 17	Tsubasa Shiina		
2001	One: Kagayaku Kisetsu e	Yuzuki poet 柚木詩子	OVA	
2001	Final Fantasy: Unlimited	Earl Tyrant, Chocobo		
2002	Mirage of Blaze	Saori Morino		
2002	Ghost in the Shell: Stand Alone Complex	Miki		
2002	Naruto	Ranmaru		
2002	Haibane Renmei	Kuu		
2003	Cinderella Boy	Mark マルコ		
2003	Fullmetal Alchemist	Clause		
2003	Maburaho	Sayaka Otoe 音邑けやき		
2003	Twin Spica	Asumi Kamogawa		
2004	Futari wa Pretty Cure	Mipple		
2004	Mars Daybreak	Sarah Shasha		
2004	Sgt. Frog	Alisa Southerncross		
2004	Monster	Wim		
2004	Gankutsuou: The Count of Monte Cristo	Haydée		
2005	Air	Boy		
2005	Futari wa Pretty Cure Max Heart	Mipple		
2005	The Law of Ueki	Yun Pao		
2005	Glass Mask	Ayumi Himekawa		
2005	Eureka Seven	Sakuya		
2005	Hell Girl	Yuki		
2005	Blood+	Diva, Riku Miyagusuku		
2006	Wan Wan Celeb Soreyuke! Tetsunoshin	Lovie / Lina ロビイ / リナ		
2006	Ergo Proxy	Pino		
2006	Inukami!	Raccoon dog タヌキ	第15話ゲスト	
2006	.hack//Roots	Gasper ガスパー		
2006	xxxHolic	Ame Warashi		
2006	Otogi-Jūshi Akazukin	Rapunzel		
2006	Kanon	Kazuya Kurata 倉田一弥		
2006	Pururun! Shizuku-chan	Longlong		
2006	Digimon Data Squad the Movie: Ultimate Power! Activate Burst Mode	rhythm リズム		
2007	Naruto: Shippuden	Young Sasori		
2007	Dennō Coil	Kyoko		
2007–09	Sayonara Zetsubou Sensei series	Chie Arai / Thunnomitsu / Thread Braid 新井智恵 / 糸色倫 / 糸色交		
2007	Blue Drop	Mari Wakatake		
2007	Clannad	My voice 僕の声		
2007	Pururun! Shizuku-chan Aha	Longlong, Karua-chan		
2007	Ghost Hound	Miyako Komagusu		
2008	Shigofumi: Letters from the Departed	Fantasy 文伽	。第10話。	
2008	Yu-Gi-Oh 5D's	Nico		
2008	xxxHolic	Ame-warashi		
2008–09	The Tower of Druaga series	Kai		
2008	Natsume's Book of Friends	Kogitsune		
2008	Casshern Sins	Luna ルナ		
2008	Clannad After Story	My voice 僕の声		
2008	Black Butler	Angela Blanc		
2009	Slayers Evolution-R	Boy		
2009	Jungle Taitei – Yūki ga Mirai wo Kaeru	Kenichi Oyama 大山賢一	フジテレビ開局50周年土曜プレミアム	
2009	Inuyasha: The Final Act	Kohaku		
2009–present	Fairy Tail	Lector		
2010	Shin Koihime Musou	Chojo		
2010	The Legend of the Legendary Heroes	Arua アルア		
2010	Cool Cute Declaration! カッコカワイイ宣言！	Various characters		
2011	Natsume's Book of Friends	A child fox 子狐		
2012	PES: Peace Eco Smile	NaSuBi	web promotional anime series by Studio 4°C	
2012	Lupin the Third: The Woman Called Fujiko Mine	Boy		
2012	Arashi no Yoru ni: Himitsu no Tomodachi	Tao タオ		
2012	Shirokuma Cafe	Lesser panda		
2012	Picchipichi Shizuku-chan	Longlong		
2013	Gaist Crusher	Aku Amun 阿久あまりん		
2013	Tokyo Ravens	Suzuka's older brother 鈴鹿の兄		
2013	Noucome	Utage Dōraku		
2014	Keroro Gunso	Alisa Southerncross		
2014–15	Garo: The Animation series	Alois, Kintoki		
2016	Shōnen Maid	Hanako Hino 日野花子		
2016	Puzzle and Dragons X パズドラクロス	Young Reims 幼いランス		
2018	Pop Team Epic	Pipimi		
	My My Mai	Mai Waku	OVA Adult	
	Canyan Bunny Extra きゃんきゃんバニー・エクストラ	Swati スワティ	OVA Adult	

=== Film ===
List of voice performances in film
Year	Title	Role	Notes	Source
1992	1000 Pine Groves せんぼんまつばら 川と生きる少年たち	Fumi ふみ		
1992	Yawara! Soreyuke Koshinuke Kizzu	Takahide Wakamatsu 若松俊秀		
1993	Crayon Shin-chan: Action Kamen vs Leotard Devil	Shinnosuke Nohara		
1994	Crayon Shin-chan: The Secret Treasure of Buri Buri Kingdom	Shinnosuke Nohara		
1995	Crayon Shin-chan: Unkokusai's Ambition	Shinnosuke Nohara		
1996	Crayon Shin-chan: Adventure in Henderland	Shinnosuke Nohara		
1996	Toire no Hanako-san	Kaori Miyano 宮野かおり		
1997	Crayon Shin-chan: Pursuit of the Balls of Darkness	Shinnosuke Nohara		
1998	Crayon Shin-chan: Blitzkrieg! Pig's Hoof's Secret Mission	Shinnosuke Nohara		
1998	Martian Successor Nadesico: The Prince of Darkness	Sayuri Terasaki		
1999	Crayon Shin-chan: Explosion! The Hot Spring's Feel Good Final Battle	Shinnosuke Nohara		
2000	Crayon Shin-chan: The Storm Called The Jungle	Shinnosuke Nohara		
2000	Pokémon 3: The Movie	Mi Snowdon		
2000	Ah! My Goddess: The Movie	Ex		
2001	One Piece: Clockwork Island Adventure	Akizu		
2001	Crayon Shin-chan: The Storm Called: The Adult Empire Strikes Back	Shinnosuke Nohara		
2002	Crayon Shin-chan: The Storm Called: The Battle of the Warring States	Shinnosuke Nohara		
2002	Inuyasha the Movie: The Castle Beyond the Looking Glass	Kohaku		
2003	Crayon Shin-chan: The Storm Called: Yakiniku Road of Honor	Shinnosuke Nohara		
2003	Inuyasha the Movie: Swords of an Honorable Ruler	Kohaku		
2004	Crayon Shin-chan: The Storm Called: The Kasukabe Boys of the Evening Sun	Shinnosuke Nohara		
2004	Konjiki no Gash Bell!! Movie 1: Unlisted Demon 101	Kotoha		
2005	Crayon Shin-chan: The Legend Called Buri Buri 3 Minutes Charge	Shinnosuke Nohara		
2005	Futari wa Pretty Cure Max Heart the Movie	Mipple		
2005	Futari wa Pretty Cure Max Heart the Movie 2: Friends of the Snow-Laden Sky	Mipple		
2006	Crayon Shin-chan: The Legend Called: Dance! Amigo!	Shinnosuke Nohara		
2006	Brave Story	Suaty		
2007	Oshare Majo: Love and Berry	Yumi		
2007	Crayon Shin-chan: The Storm Called: The Singing Buttocks Bomb	Shinnosuke Nohara		
2007	Summer Days with Coo	Female announcer		
2008	Crayon Shin-chan: The Storm Called: The Hero of Kinpoko	Shinnosuke Nohara		
2008	Resident Evil: Degeneration	Learnie Chowler ラーニー・チャウラー		
2009	Pretty Cure All Stars DX: Everyone's Friends☆the Collection of Miracles!	Mipple		
2009	Crayon Shin-chan: Roar! Kasukabe Animal Kingdom	Shinnosuke Nohara		
2010	Pretty Cure All Stars DX2: Light of Hope☆Protect the Rainbow Jewel!	Mipple		
2010	Crayon Shin-chan: Super-Dimension! The Storm Called My Bride	Shinnosuke Nohara		
2010	King of Thorn	Tim		
2010	Colorful	Child of sweets shop 駄菓子屋の子供		
2011	Pretty Cure All Stars DX3: Deliver the Future! The Rainbow-Colored Flower That Connects the World	Mipple		
2011	Crayon Shin-chan: The Storm Called: Operation Golden Spy	Shinnosuke Nohara		
2011	Little Ghostly Adventures of Tofu Boy 豆富小僧	Throbbing おろく		
2012	A challenge しらんぷり	Dong Chan ドンチャン		
2012	Crayon Shin-chan: The Storm Called!: Me and the Space Princess	Shinnosuke Nohara		
2013	Pretty Cure All Stars New Stage 2: Friends of the Heart	Mipple		
2013	Crayon Shin-chan: Very Tasty! B-class Gourmet Survival!!	Shinnosuke Nohara		
2014	Ōkii Ichinensei to Chiisana Ninensei 大きい1年生と小さな2年生	Akiyo	short film featured at Anime Mirai 2014	
2014	Crayon Shin-chan: Serious Battle! Robot Dad Strikes Back	Shinnosuke Nohara		
2015	Pretty Cure All Stars: Carnival of Spring♪	Mipple		
2015	Crayon Shin-chan: My Moving Story! Cactus Large Attack!	Shinnosuke Nohara		
2015	Miss Hokusai	Child of a tea room 茶屋の子供		
2015	Gamba: Gamba to Nakama-tachi	Chūta		
2016	Crayon Shin-chan: Fast Asleep! Dreaming World Big Assault!	Shinnosuke Nohara		
2017	Crayon Shin-chan: Invasion!! Alien Shiriri	Shinnosuke Nohara		
2018	Crayon Shin-chan: Burst Serving! Kung Fu Boys ~Ramen Rebellion~	Shinnosuke Nohara	This film marks the last appearance of Akiko Yajima as she retired from the franchise.	
2018	Hug! Pretty Cure Futari wa Pretty Cure: All Stars Memories	Mipple		
2019	Birthday Wonderland			

=== Video games ===
List of voice performances in video games
Year	Title	Role	Notes	Source
1995–98	Galaxy Fraulein Yuna games	Erika Kousaka		
1996	Cry Sweeper クライスイーパー	Kai Shi 甲斐シュリ	PC Adult	
1996	Idol Janshi Suchie-Pai games	Shiho Katagiri		
1997	Dōkyūsei 2	Tomomi Mizuno	Various platforms	
1998	Lament and ... 慟哭 そして...	Aoki Senju 青木千砂	SS トラウマになりかけるほど1番残酷な死に方をしたヒロイン。	
1998	Succubus ~ The fallen angel ~ サキュヴァス ～堕ちた天使～	Tina ティナ	PC Adult	
1998	Martian Successor Nadesico	Kazama Itsuki, Sayuri Terasaki	SS	
1998–99	Twins stories wanting to tell you ... ツインズストーリー きみにつたえたくて...	Kikuoka Hanano 菊岡華乃	PC	
1999	Circadia サーカディア	Kiryuin Deep Snow 桐生院深雪	PS1 / PS2	
1999	Fire Himitsune ~ Love ~ 火魅子伝 ～恋解～	Atago 愛宕	PS1 / PS2	
1999–2000	Persona 2 games	Maya Amano	PS1 / PS2 罪ではヒロイン、罰では主人公	
1999	Little Lovers SHE SO GAME; Little Lovers SHE SO GAME	Erika Shinto 神藤えりか	PS1 / PS2	
1999	Yukyu Fantasia 3 Perpetual blue 悠久幻想曲3 Perpetual blue	Bisette Marsh	DC	
2000	Mega Man Legends 2	Sera	PS1 / PS2	
2000	Cosmo Warrior Zero	Les Silviana / Hermatia レ・シルビアーナ / ヘルマティア	PS1 / PS2	
2000	Eternal Suite: All Star Project 悠久組曲 All Star Project	Bisset Marsh ビセット・マーシュ	PS1 / PS2	
2000	Kōkidō Gensō Gunparade March	Yumi Arai 新井木勇美	PS1 / PS2	
2000	Blue Submarine No. 6	Lan Chuang 蘭芳	DC	
2001	Harry Potter and the Philosopher's Stone	Harry Potter	PS1 / PS2	
2001	Inuyasha	Kohaku, Yura of the Hair	PS1	
2002	Grandia Xtreme	Dene ディーネ	PS1 / PS2	
2002	Star Wars: Galactic Battlegrounds	Anakin Skywalker	PC 日本語版	
2002	Harry Potter and the Chamber of Secrets	Harry Potter	PS1 / PS2	
2003	Sunrise World War From Sunrise Heroes サンライズワールドウォー From サンライズ英雄譚	R · Dorothy Weinright / Yoshinaga Surrey; R・ドロシー・ウェインライト / 吉永サリー	PS1 / PS2	
2004	Onimusha 3	Henri Blanc アンリ・ブラン	PS1 / PS2	
2004	Zatch Bell! games	Kotoha		
2004–05	Futari wa Pretty Cure games	Mipple		
2005	Another Century's Episode	Lillina · Peace Craft リリーナ・ピースクラフト	PS1 / PS2	
2005	New Century Brave War	Yoshinaga Surrey 吉永サリー	PS1 / PS2	
2006	Valkyrie Profile: Lenneth	Ariesa アリーシャ	PSP	
2006–14	Crayon Shin-chan games	Shinnosuke Nohara		
2006	.hack//G.U. series	Gaspard	PS1 / PS2, Vol. 1 and 2	
2006	Valkyrie Profile 2: Silmeria	Alicia	PS1 / PS2 主人公	
2006	Brave Story: New Traveler	Wataru Mitani	PS2, PSP	
2006	Blood+ games	Riku Miyagi		
2006	Tales of the World: Radiant Mythology	Annie Barth アニー・バース	PSP	
2007	Everybody's Golf 5	Chris クリス	PS3	
2007	Another Century's Episode 3: The Final	Sakuya サクヤ	PS1 / PS2	
2009	Tales of the World: Radiant Mythology 2	Annie Barth アニー・バース	PSP	
2009	Boku no Natsuyasumi 4	Me ボク	PSP	
2009	Super Robot Wars Neo	Puffy · Pafrisia パッフィー・パフリシア	Wii	
2010	White Knight Chronicles	Fran-Powers フランポワーズ	PS3	
2010	Hello, Good-bye	Natsume Rindo	PC Adult こゆき名義。読みは「りんどう なつめ」	
2011	Tales of the World: Radiant Mythology 3	Annie Barth アニー・バース	PSP	
2012	Toriko: Gourmet Survival! 2	Merck メルク	PSP	
2013	Super Robot Wars Operation Extend	Puffy · Pafrisia パッフィー・パフリシア	PSP	
2014	Aka and Akashiyaki あかやあかしやあやかしの	Maple もみじ	PSP	
2014	Tales of the World: Reve Unitia	Annie Barth アニー・バース	DS	
1999	Magic Woman M	Merle メルル	Other 正直名作です。漫画の続き読みてえ	
2003	Castle Shikigami 2	Nie gorgeous blue ニーギ・ゴージャスブルー	PS1 / PS2	
	Heroine Dream ヒロインドリーム	Kyushu circle 九櫛円	PS1 / PS2	
2001	Dokapon: Monster Hunter	Uiui ウイウイ	PS1 / PS2 地球外生命体です？	
2004	Tales of Rebirth	Annie Barrs	PS2	
2012	Majikoi S	Cookie Fourth form クッキー第四形態	PC Adult 田辺美沙名義	

=== Drama CDs ===
List of voice performances in drama CDs
Year	Title	Role	Notes	Source
2004	Renten Rose レンテンローズ	Miyuki, Primula ミユキ / プリムラ		
2012	Rui no Masaiban			
	Galaxy Fraulein Yuna	Erika Kousaka		
	Gundam Wing	Relena Dorian	Radio	
	Haou Taikei Ryuu Knight	Paffy		
	Hayate × Blade	Hitsugi Amachi		
	Vampire Hunter	Anita	Radio and CD	
	Yuukyuu Gensoukyoku 3: Perpetual Blue			

=== Dubbing ===
List of voice performances in overseas dubbing
Year	Title	Role	Dub for	Notes/Source
1994	Home Alone	Kevin McAllister	Macaulay Culkin	
1995	Noddy's Toyland Adventures	Tessie Bear	Susan Sheridan	
1995	Sudden Death	Emily McCord	Whittni Wright	
1996	Jingle All the Way	Jamie Langston	Jake Lloyd	
1997	Home Alone 2: Lost in New York	Kevin McAllister	Macaulay Culkin	
1998	Interview with the Vampire	Claudia	Kirsten Dunst	Fuji TV edition
1999	Star Wars: Episode I – The Phantom Menace	Anakin Skywalker	Jake Lloyd	
2000	Big Daddy	Julian McGrath	Dylan and Cole Sprouse	
2000	The Sixth Sense	Cole Sear	Haley Joel Osment	
2001	Cats & Dogs	Lou		
2001	Don't Say a Word	Jessie Conrad	Skye McCole Bartusiak	
2001	Casper's Haunted Christmas	Casper	Animation	
2002	Edges of the Lord	Romek	Haley Joel Osment	
2007	Joshua	Joshua Cairn	Jacob Kogan	
2008	CJ7	Dicky Chow	Xu Jiao	
2009	Kramer vs. Kramer	Billy Kramer	Justin Henry	
2009	Cloudy with a Chance of Meatballs	Cal		
2010	The Karate Kid	Dre Parker	Jaden Smith	
2010	Despicable Me	Edith		
2011	Nanny McPhee and the Big Bang	Norman Green	Asa Butterfield	
2011	Let Me In	Owen	Kodi Smit-McPhee	
2011	The Man from Nowhere	So-mi	Kim Sae-ron	
2012	Dark Shadows	David Collins	Gully McGrath	
2013	Despicable Me 2	Edith		
2014	The Lego Movie	Wonder Woman		
2017	Kubo and the Two Strings	Kubo		
2019	Home Alone 3	Parrot		
2024	Despicable Me 4	Edith		
