= The Wonderland =

- Theatrical release poster

Japanese name
- Kanji: バースデー・ワンダーランド
Transcriptions
- Revised Hepburn: Bāsudē Wandārando
- Directed by: Keiichi Hara
- Screenplay by: Miho Maruo
- Produced by: Nobuo Kawakami
- Starring: Mayu Matsuoka; Anne Watanabe; Kumiko Aso
- Music by: Harumi Fūki
- Production company: Signal.MD
- Distributed by: Warner Bros. Pictures
- Release dates: April 26, 2019 (Japan); June 2019 (AIAFF)
- Running time: 115 minutes
- Country: Japan
- Language: Japanese

The Wonderland, known in Japan and the UK as Birthday Wonderland (Japanese: バースデー・ワンダーランド, Hepburn: Bāsudē Wandārando), is a 2019 Japanese animated coming-of-age fantasy adventure film directed by Keiichi Hara. Based on the 1988 children's story Chikashitsu Kara no Fushigi na Tabi (Strange Journey from the Basement) by Sachiko Kashiwaba, it stars Mayu Matsuoka, Anne Watanabe and Kumiko Aso. The characters were designed by Ilya Kuvshinov. It premiered in Japan on April 26, 2019, and was screened in competition at the Annecy International Animation Film Festival in June 2019. It was the final Japanese film to be released in the Heisei era, five days before the 2019 Japanese imperial transition.

== Voice cast ==
- Mayu Matsuoka as Akane
- Anne Watanabe as Chii
- Kumiko Aso as Midori
- Nao Tōyama as Pipo
- Keiji Fujiwara as Zan Gu
- Akiko Yajima as Doropo
- Masachika Ichimura as Hippocrates

== English voice cast ==
- Lisa Reimold as Akane
- Allegra Clark as Chii
- TBA as Midori
- Jackie Lastra as Pipo
- Ben Lepley as Zan Gu
- Jennifer Losi as Doropo
- Zach Aguilar as Prince
- Frank Todaro as Hippocrates

== Release and reception ==
Matt Schley of The Japan Times gave the film 3 out of 5 stars, praising the animation and visuals but suggesting it as being among a number of anime films "trying to recreate the charms of Miyazaki". He concluded: "The Wonderland is not the first, and will almost definitely not be the last, to try to push the Miyazaki buttons — and while it succeeds on the surface, it lacks the deeper emotional core to make for something truly wondrous." Allan Hunter of Screen Daily wrote that the "overly busy story provides countless opportunities to create imaginative worlds and strange characters, but it also tends to feel like a string of set pieces rather than something that builds dramatic tension or momentum", feeling that "a less elaborate approach might have achieved more of an emotional impact." While noting the film's shortcomings, Twwk of Beneath the Tangles also wrote, "I could appreciate the direction, which sometimes created an intensity and urgency that made me worry for the characters, and the abounding fantasy which reminded me that I, too, had an imagination once."

US and Canada disc releases were available from Shout Factory in 2020-10-06.
