= Crayon Shin-chan: Fierceness That Invites Storm! The Hero of Kinpoko =

- Theatrical release poster
- Directed by: Mitsuru Hongo
- Screenplay by: Mitsuru Hongo
- Based on: Crayon Shin-chan by Yoshito Usui
- Starring: Akiko Yajima; Miki Narahashi; Keiji Fujiwara; Satomi Kōrogi; Yui Horie; Mitsuru Miyamoto; Rei Sakuma; Takako Honda
- Production company: Shin-Ei Animation
- Distributed by: Toho
- Release date: April 19, 2008; (Japan)
- Running time: 93 minutes
- Country: Japan
- Language: Japanese
- Box office: $12,064,468

Crayon Shin-chan: Fierceness That Invites Storm! The Hero of Kinpoko (original Japanese title: クレヨンしんちゃん ちょー嵐を呼ぶ 金矛の勇者, Kureyon Shinchan: chou arashi wo yobu! kinpoko no yuusha) is an anime film released in 2008. This film, representing the 16th installment in the film series adapted from the widely recognized manga and anime series Crayon Shin-Chan, was produced by Shin-Ei Animation. The film, with a duration of 93 minutes, achieved commercial success, earning approximately 1.2 billion yen at the box office. It premiered in theaters across Japan on April 19, 2008.

== Plot ==
In the film "Crayon Shin-chan: Fierceness That Invites Storm! The Hero of Kinpoko", the story unfolds with the young protagonist, Shinnosuke (Shinchan), persuading his mother to buy him an Action Kamen sword. Unbeknownst to them, the sword is linked to an ancient prophecy and soon leads to a series of unusual events in Shinchan's life.

The narrative further introduces the antagonist, the Dark Lord of the Don Kurai Dark World, who has ambitions to conquer the human world. The film incorporates a dark legend surrounding a "Hero" tasked with vanquishing darkness, known as Uchiharau, and mentions "three treasures"—one of which, the "tak of copper", has already been stolen. A knowledgeable individual, aware of the Dark Lord's schemes, is dispatched to the human world in search of the remaining two treasures: "the shield of silver" and the "golden sword."

Meanwhile, Shinnosuke purchases an "Action Sword", a new toy from his favorite superhero, Action Kamen, from a department store. However, upon opening the box at home, he discovers it contains a mispackaged action Sword ruler instead. Around the same time, Shinchan finds a black dog resembling his pet Shiro and names it Kuro.

That evening, Shinchan encounters a mysterious woman searching for Puririn in his house. Unaware of her true intentions, he follows her outside, intrigued by her presence. It's later revealed that Puririn are dark men sent by the Dark Lord, and Shinchan inadvertently helps them open a portal connecting the human world to Don Kurai.

The following day, darkness invades the human world, and the portal Shinchan opened disappears. His hometown experiences various calamities due to this darkness. Concurrently, Shinchan meets Tami Mata, a girl who informs him about the "Golden Sword", a hero destined to protect him. Shinchan resolves to combat the darkness alongside Mata. However, it's revealed that Mata's appearance is a ruse set by Puririn. Later that night, Shinchan encounters a man urging him to sign an agreement, which he refuses.

== Cast ==
- Akiko Yajima – Shinnosuke Nohara
- Miki Narahashi – Misae Nohara
- Keiji Fujiwara – Hiroshi Nohara
- Satomi Kōrogi – Himawari Nohara
- Mari Mashiba – Kazama-Kun Shiro
- Yui Horie – Mata Tami
- Tamao Hayashi – Nene Sakurada
- Chie Satō – Bo-chan
- Rokurō Naya – Principal teacher
- Yumi Takada – Ms. Yoshinaga
- Michie Tomizawa – Ms. Matsuzaka
- Mitsuru Miyamoto – Makku
- Rei Sakuma – Chitai
- Takako Honda – Puririn
- Tesshō Genda – Action Kamen
- Etsuko Kozakura – Mimiko
- Shōzō Iizuka – Member of Parliament
- Chafurin – Razaya Dan
- Daisuke Gōri – Bunchou
- Takeharu Onishi – Mata Dabi
- Takuo Kawamura – Aruma Jiro

== Music ==
- Opening Theme – "YURU YURU DE-O!"

(Akiko Yajima) Shinnosuke Nohara – song / Takafumi Iwasaki – Arranger / 就 Yasushi Nakamura – composer Mutouyuji / – o Lyrics

- Insert song – "Gold, Gold, Money"

song / Toshiyuki Arakawa – – composer / Mitsuru Hongo – Lyrics o la Mac Kuranosuke (Mitsuru Miyamoto)

- Insert song – "Viva Viva Zunzun gymnastics"

song / Toshiyuki Arakawa – – composer / Mitsuru Hongo – o brother song lyrics (Yoshio Kojima)

- Insert song – "Dreaming little bird"

song / Megumi Little Women – – composer / Mitsuru Hongo – Lyrics o Mata Tami (Yui Horie)

- Ending Theme – "Let's go with a popular person!"

DJ OZMA – song / Ranmaru stars – Composer DJ OZMA / – Arrangement Lyrics

== International release ==
It was released in India on Hungama TV under the title "Shin Chan Movie: The Golden Sword" on January 26, 2013.

== See also ==
- Crayon Shin-chan
- Yoshito Usui
- Shin-Ei Animation
