= Hajimari no Michi =

- DVD cover
- Directed by: Keiichi Hara
- Written by: Keiichi Hara
- Produced by: Hirotaka Aragaki; Yoshitaka Ishizuka
- Starring: Ryo Kase
- Distributed by: Shochiku Company
- Release date: June 1, 2013 (Japan)
- Running time: 96 minutes
- Country: Japan
- Language: Japanese

Hajimari no Michi (Japanese: はじまりのみち), also known as Dawn of a Filmmaker: The Keisuke Kinoshita Story, is a 2013 Japanese biographical film directed by Keiichi Hara about Japanese filmmaker Keisuke Kinoshita.

== Cast ==
- Ryo Kase as Keisuke Kinoshita
- Yūko Tanaka as Tama Kinoshita
- Yūsuke Santamaria as Toshizo Kinoshita
- Gaku Hamada as Keisuke's assistant
- Ren Osugi as Shiro Kido
- Aoi Miyazaki as narrator
