= Crayon Shin-chan: Jungle That Invites Storm =

- Theatrical release poster
- Kanji: クレヨンしんちゃん 嵐を呼ぶジャングル
- Revised Hepburn: Kureyon Shinchan: Arashi o Yobu Janguru?
- Directed by: Keiichi Hara
- Screenplay by: Keiichi Hara
- Based on: Crayon Shin-chan by Yoshito Usui
- Produced by: Hidetaka Ikuta; Junichi Yamakawa; Taro Iwamoto; Yasushi Wada
- Starring: Akiko Yajima; Miki Narahashi; Keiji Fujiwara; Satomi Kōrogi; Mari Mashiba; Tamao Hayashi; Teiyū Ichiryūsai; Chie Satō; Tesshō Genda; Akio Ōtsuka
- Production company: Shin-Ei Animation
- Distributed by: Toho
- Release date: April 22, 2000 (Japan)
- Running time: 92 minutes
- Country: Japan
- Language: Japanese
- Box office: ¥1.1 billion

Crayon Shin-chan: Jungle That Invites Storm (クレヨンしんちゃん 嵐を呼ぶジャングル, Kureyon Shinchan: Arashi o Yobu Janguru?) is a 2000 Japanese anime film produced by Shin-Ei Animation. It is the 8th film of the anime series Crayon Shin-chan. Keiichi Hara directed this film and also wrote the screenplay.

== Plot ==
Shinnosuke and his parents including Shiro along with his friends and families go on a cruise for several days to meet the actor of the character Action Kamen and watch the latest film of Action Kamen. But a group of monkeys raid the ship and all of the adults who are present on the ship above 18 years are taken to an island at night. Shinnosuke and his friends including Himawari and Shiro start their journey to rescue all of them. They meet Paradise King, who is controlling the monkeys. They succeed to rescue them and return to ship, but Paradise King attacks them back. Shinnosuke and Action Kamen fight back and defeat him. Later all of them enjoy the Action Kamen film.

== Cast ==
- Akiko Yajima as Shinnosuke Nohara
- Keiji Fujiwara as Hiroshi Nohara
- Miki Narahashi as Misae Nohara
- Satomi Kōrogi as Himawari Nohara
- Mari Mashiba as Toru Kazama and Shiro
- Tamao Hayashi as Nene Sakurada
- Teiyū Ichiryūsai as Masao Sato
- Chie Satō as Bo Suzuki
- Akio Ōtsuka as Paradise King
- Tesshō Genda as Gotarō aka Action Kamen
- Etsuko Kozakura as Mimiko Sakura
- Sakiko Tamagawa as Mineko Kazama: Toru's mother
- Junko Hagimori as Moeko Sakurada: Nene's mother
- Tomoko Otsuka as Ekasuky Sato: Masao's mother
- Ayako Kawasumi as Ai Suotome
- Fumihiko Tachiki as Kuroiso: bodyguard of Ai
- Yumi Takada as Midori Yoshinaga
- Michie Tomizawa as Ume Matsuzaka
- Kotono Mitsuishi as Masumi Ageo
- Rokurō Naya as Bunta Takakura: principal of Futaba Kindergarten
- Hisako Kyōda as Kasukabe bookstore manager
- Sakurako Kishiro as Nakamura: Kasukabe bookstore worker
- Kazue Ikura as Ryuko Fukazumi
- Chizuko Hoshino as Ogin Uonome
- Akiko Muta as Mary
- Sayuri Yamauchi as Nanako Oohara
- Daisuke Sakaguchi as Yoshirin Hatogaya
- Fumie Kusachi as Micchi Hatogaya
- Ginzō Matsuo as Ginnosuke Nohara
- Reiko Suzuki as Reiko Kitamoto aka aunt next door: neighbour of the Nohara family
- Kōsuke Okano as Someya
- Hiroshi Masuoka as Dr. North Kasukabe
- Miki Itō as TV narrator
- Kan Tokumaru as Captain
- Takeharu Onishi, Tetsuya Iwanaga, Jin Domon as ship officer
- Fumihiko Tachiki as strongest phantom
- Sachiko Kobayashi as Pegasus

== Characters ==
=== Monkeys ===
They stay on the island. They worked for Paradise King and kidnapped all the adults from the ship. After being defeated by humans, they stopped working for Paradise King, when Shinnosuke pretended to be Paradise King and told them to lead their lives freely.

=== Paradise King ===
A resident of the island. When he reached to the island, the monkeys staying there attacked him. After a huge battle, Paradise King managed to defeat them and started controlling the monkeys. He was defeated by Shinnosuke and Action Kamen when he tried to drown the ship using dynamite from his glider.

== Release ==
The film was released on 22 April 2000 in Japan. It was also released in India by The Walt Disney Studios India through the Walt Disney Pictures banner on April 1, 2011, under the title Shin-chan: Bungle in the Jungle. It was released as Crayon ShinChan The Movie: Storming Jungle with English subtitles on VCD by PMP Entertainment.

== See also ==
- List of Crayon Shin-chan films
- List of Crayon Shin-chan characters
