= Ai Kobayashi =

Japanese actress and voice actress (born 1973)

- 小林 愛
- Born: May 25, 1973 (age 53); Adachi, Tokyo, Japan
- Occupations: Actress, voice actress
- Years active: 1992–present
- Agent: Office Osawa

Ai Kobayashi (小林 愛, Kobayashi Ai; born May 25, 1973) is a Japanese actress and voice actress. She is known for her work in anime, animated films, video games, and dubbing of foreign media. Kobayashi has been active since the early 1990s and is affiliated with Office Osawa.

== Biography ==
Ai Kobayashi was born on May 25, 1973, in Adachi, Tokyo, Japan. She began her acting career in the early 1990s, initially appearing in live-action productions before transitioning into voice acting. Over the course of her career, she has performed a wide range of roles in television animation, theatrical films, video games, and Japanese-language dubs of foreign films and television series.

== Career ==
Kobayashi gained recognition through her roles in late-1990s and early-2000s anime productions. One of her early notable roles was Lily Borjano in Turn A Gundam (1999). She continued to appear in prominent mecha and science fiction series, including Overman King Gainer (2002) and Ergo Proxy (2006), where she voiced Mayahuel.

She is also known for voicing antagonistic characters, including The Infant and Hakudoshi in Inuyasha and Inuyasha: The Final Act. In the Pretty Cure franchise, she voiced Viblis in Pretty Cure (2004) and later appeared as Tsurune Hanamichi in Delicious Party Pretty Cure (2022).

In feature films, Kobayashi provided the voice of Electra in Cowboy Bebop: The Movie (a.k.a. Cowboy Bebop: Knockin' on Heaven's Door, 2001) and appeared in multiple Crayon Shin-chan films. She also voiced Deunan Knute in the 2004 animated film adaptation of Appleseed.

Outside of animation, Kobayashi has worked extensively in dubbing foreign films and television series into Japanese. In video games, she is credited as the Japanese voice of Samus Aran in Metroid: Other M (2010).

== Filmography ==
=== Television animation ===
- Turn A Gundam (1999) – Lily Borjano
- Overman King Gainer (2002) – Sara Kodama
- Pretty Cure (2004) – Viblis
- Inuyasha (2004) – The Infant
- Ergo Proxy (2006) – Mayahuel
- Detroit Metal City (2008) – Death Records president
- Inuyasha: The Final Act (2009) – Hakudoshi
- Majin Bone (2014) – Anna
- Delicious Party Pretty Cure (2022) – Tsurune Hanamichi

=== Animated films ===
- Cowboy Bebop: The Movie (Japanese title: Cowboy Bebop: Knockin' on Heaven's Door) (2001) – Electra Ovirowa (Electra Ovilo)
- Crayon Shin-chan: The Storm Called: The Adult Empire Strikes Back (2001) – Chaco
- Crayon Shin-chan: Fierceness That Invites Storm! The Battle of the Warring States (2002) – Ren Kasuga
- Turn A Gundam: Earth Light (2002) – Lily Borjano
- Turn A Gundam II: Moonlight Butterfly (2002) – Lily Borjano
- Appleseed (2004) – Deunan Knute

=== Video games ===
- Metroid: Other M (2010) – Samus Aran

=== Dubbing ===
- Bad Boys for Life (2020) – Megan Burnett
- All of Us Are Dead (2022) – Cheong-san's mother
- Hypnotic (2024) – Thelma
