= Michio Hazama =

Japanese voice actor and narrator (born 1933)

- 羽佐間 道夫
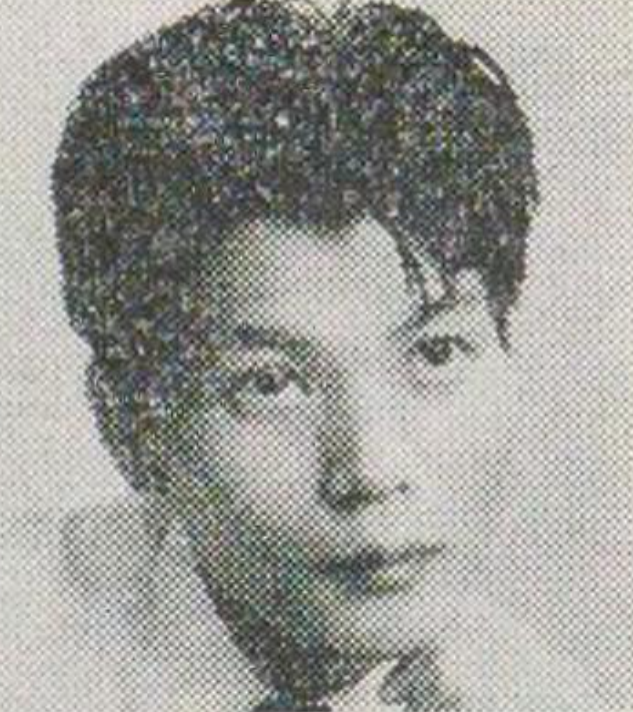
- Hazama in 1962
- Born: October 7, 1933 (age 92); Tokyo, Japan
- Occupations: Actor; voice actor; narrator
- Years active: 1950s - present
- Agent: Mouvement Ltd.
- Known for: voice actor
- Website: Official website

Michio Hazama (羽佐間道夫, Hazama Michio; born October 7, 1933) is a Japanese voice actor and narrator.

He appeared primarily in dubbing and is best known for dubbing over Sylvester Stallone, Roy Scheider and Dean Martin. Note that he said in a 2018 interview that he has dubbed about 280 Hollywood stars so far.

Because of his versatility in playing a variety of roles, he was once called "Hazama in a pinch" by casting directors. Later, the position was transferred to Koichi Yamadera.

As of 2023, he is still active and is the oldest male voice actor in Japan with regular work.

== Filmography ==
=== Television animation ===
- Astro Boy (1963) (Kinoo (ep. 33), Brutus (ep. 40), Nuwu (ep. 48))
- Star of the Giants (1968) (Jōji Hayami)
- Anne of Green Gables (1979) (Narrator)
- Game Center Arashi (1982) (Burashi Ishino)
- Super Dimension Fortress Macross (1982) (Bruno J. Global)
- Nadia: The Secret of Blue Water (1990) (Narrator)
- Master Keaton (1998) (Lord Fenders)
- Monster (2004) (Hans Georg Schubert)
- Tokimeki Memorial Only Love (2007) (Board Chairman Retsuyama Baku)
- Ultraviolet: Code 044 (2008) (King)
- Sword Art Online (2013) (Old man/Kraken)
- Okko's Inn (2018) (Yoshiharu Inada (ep. 9))
- Gibiate (2020) (Yukinojyo Onikura)

=== OVA ===
- Legend of the Galactic Heroes (1989) (Walter von Schenkopp)
- Giant Robo: The Day the Earth Stood Still (1992) (The Dazzling Cervantes)
- Green Legend Ran (1992) (Jeke)
- Spirit of Wonder (1992) (Dr. Breckenridge)
- Black Jack (1993) (Police Inspector Takasugi)

=== ONA ===
- Pluto (2023) (Duncan)

=== Theatrical animation ===
- Ganbare!! Tabuchi-kun!! (1979) (Tatsuro Hirooka)
- Be Forever Yamato (1980) (Narrator)
- The Super Dimension Fortress Macross: Do You Remember Love? (1984) (Bruno J. Global)
- The Dagger of Kamui (1985) (Taroza)
- Memories (1995) (Nirasaki)
- Crayon Shin-chan: The Storm Called: The Battle of the Warring States (2002) (Yasutsuna)
- Summer Days with Coo (2007) (The Samurai, Shimizu)
- Space Battleship Yamato: Resurrection (2009) (Narrator)
- Pop in Q (2016)
- Scarlet (2025) (The elder leader)

=== Video games ===
- Sakura Wars 2: Thou Shalt Not Die (1998) (Kazuyoshi Yamaguchi)
- Super Robot Wars Alpha (2000) (Bruno J. Global, The Dazzling Cervantes)
- Another Century's Episode 2 (2006) (Bruno J. Global)
- White Knight Chronicles (2008) (King Valtos)
- Detective Pikachu (2016) (Ethan Graham)
- Lego Dimensions (2016) (Gandalf)
- Nioh 2 (2020) (Sen no Rikyū)
- Final Fantasy VII Remake Intergrade (2021) (Gurin)
- Final Fantasy VII Rebirth (2024) (Gurin)

=== Live-action film ===
- Sono Koe no Anata e (2022) (Himself)

=== Dubbing roles ===
==== Live-action ====
- Dean Martin
  - Money from Home (Herman "Honey Talk" Nelson)
  - The Young Lions (Michael Whiteacre)
  - Rio Bravo (1969 and 1973 TV Asahi editions) (Dude)
  - Ocean's 11 (1967 and 1972 TV Asahi editions) (Sam Harmon)
  - Sergeants 3 (Sergeant Chip Deal)
  - 4 for Texas (Joe Jarrett)
  - Robin and the 7 Hoods (Little John)
  - What a Way to Go! (Leonard 'Lennie' Crawley)
  - Marriage on the Rocks (Ernie Brewer)
  - The Sons of Katie Elder (Tom Elder)
  - Texas Across the River (1973 TV Asahi edition) (Sam Hollis)
  - Rough Night in Jericho (Alex Flood)
  - Bandolero! (Dee Bishop)
  - Airport (1973 NTV and 1981 TV Asahi editions) (Vernon Demerest)
  - The Cannonball Run (1984 Fuji TV and 1987 TV Asahi editions) (Jamie Blake)
  - Cannonball Run II (Jamie Blake)
- Roy Scheider
  - The French Connection (Det. Buddy 'Cloudy' Russo)
  - The Seven-Ups (Buddy)
  - Jaws (2004 TV Tokyo edition) (Chief Martin Brody)
  - Marathon Man (Henry "Doc" Levy)
  - Sorcerer (Jackie Scanlon - 'Juan Dominguez')
  - Jaws 2 (2022 BS Tokyo edition) (Chief Martin Brody)
  - All That Jazz (Joseph "Joe" Gideon)
  - Still of the Night (Dr. Sam Rice)
  - Blue Thunder (1986 Fuji TV and 1988 TV Asahi editions) (Officer Frank Murphy)
  - 2010: The Year We Make Contact (1988 TV Asahi edition) (Dr. Heywood R. Floyd)
  - 52 Pick-Up (Harry Mitchell)
  - Night Game (Mike Seaver)
  - Cohen and Tate (Cohen)
  - Wild Justice (Peter Stride)
- Sylvester Stallone
  - Rocky (Rocky Balboa)
  - F.I.S.T. (Johnny Kovak)
  - Rocky II (Rocky Balboa)
  - First Blood (1990 TBS edition) (John Rambo)
  - Rocky III (1987 TBS edition) (Rocky Balboa)
  - Rambo: First Blood Part II (1990 TBS edition) (John Rambo)
  - Rocky IV (1989 TBS edition) (Rocky Balboa)
  - Cobra (1988 TBS edition) (Lieutenant Marion 'Cobra' Cobretti)
  - Over the Top (1991 TBS edition) (Lincoln Hawk)
  - Rocky V (1994 NTV edition) (Rocky Balboa)
  - Oscar (Angelo "Snaps" Provolone)
  - Stop! Or My Mom Will Shoot (Sgt. Joseph Andrew 'Joe' Bomowski)
  - Rocky Balboa (Rocky Balboa)
  - Creed (Rocky Balboa)
  - Creed II (Rocky Balboa)
- Michael Caine
  - Funeral in Berlin (1972 TV Tokyo edition) (Harry Palmer)
  - Hurry Sundown (Henry Warren)
  - The Italian Job (Charlie Croker)
  - Sleuth (Milo Tindle)
  - The Marseille Contract (John Deray)
  - The Man Who Would Be King (Peachy Carnehan)
  - Dressed to Kill (1991 TV Asahi edition) (Dr. Robert Elliott/Bobbi)
  - The Island (1988 TV Asahi edition) (Blair Maynard)
  - Hannah and Her Sisters (Elliot)
  - Jaws: The Revenge (1991 TV Asahi edition) (Hoagie Newcombe)
  - Miss Congeniality (2005 NTV edition) (Victor Melling)
- Steve Martin
  - Three Amigos (Lucky Day)
  - Parenthood (Gil Buckman)
  - Grand Canyon (Davis)
  - Housesitter (Newton Davis)
  - Father of the Bride Part II (George Banks)
  - The Out-of-Towners (Henry Clark)
  - The Pink Panther (Inspector Jacques Clouseau)
  - The Pink Panther 2 (Inspector Jacques Clouseau)
  - Only Murders in the Building (Charles-Haden Savage)
- Peter Sellers
  - Lolita (Clare Quilty)
  - After the Fox (Aldo Vanucci / Federico Fabrizi)
  - The Return of the Pink Panther (Inspector Jacques Clouseau)
  - Murder by Death (1981 TBS edition) (Inspector Sidney Wang)
  - The Pink Panther Strikes Again (Inspector Jacques Clouseau)
  - Revenge of the Pink Panther (Inspector Jacques Clouseau)
  - The Fiendish Plot of Dr. Fu Manchu (Fu Manchu / Nayland Smith)
- Al Pacino
  - Sea of Love (Detective Frank Keller)
  - Dick Tracy (Alphonse "Big Boy" Caprice)
  - Looking for Richard (Richard III)
  - Ocean's Thirteen (2010 Fuji TV edition) (Willy Bank)
  - Danny Collins (Danny Collins)
- Ian McKellen
  - The Hobbit: An Unexpected Journey (Gandalf the Grey)
  - The Hobbit: The Desolation of Smaug (Gandalf the Grey)
  - The Hobbit: The Battle of the Five Armies (Gandalf the Grey)
  - All Is True (Earl of Southampton)
- The Absent-Minded Professor (Professor Ned Brainard (Fred MacMurray))
- Alias (Arvin Sloane (Ron Rifkin))
- Amadeus (Count Orsini-Rosenberg (Charles Kay))
- The A-Team (John "Hannibal" Smith (George Peppard))
- The A-Team (film) (General Russell Morrison (Gerald McRaney))
- Bad Boys (1999 Fuji TV edition) (Captain Conrad Howard (Joe Pantoliano))
- Batman Returns (1994 TV Asahi edition) (The Mayor (Michael Murphy))
- Beethoven (George Newton (Charles Grodin))
- The Best Exotic Marigold Hotel (Sir Graham Dashwood (Tom Wilkinson))
- Better Call Saul (Charles "Chuck" McGill (Michael McKean))
- Beverly Hills Cop III (Detective Jon Flint (Héctor Elizondo))
- The Big Lebowski (VHS/DVD edition) (Jackie Treehorn (Ben Gazzara))
- Combat! (PFC William G. Kirby (Jack Hogan))
- Das Boot (Kapitänleutnant (Jürgen Prochnow))
- Die Hard with a Vengeance (1998 Fuji TV edition) (Simon Peter Gruber (Jeremy Irons))
- El Dorado (Sheriff J.P. Harrah (Robert Mitchum))
- Emmanuelle (1979 TV Tokyo edition) (Jean (Daniel Sarky))
- Escape to Athena (1982 TBS edition) (Charlie (Elliott Gould))
- Flubber (Chester Hoenicker (Raymond J. Barry))
- Golden Rendezvous (1979 TV Tokyo edition) (John Carter (Richard Harris))
- Hard Target (1997 Fuji TV edition) (Elijah Roper (Willie C. Carpenter))
- House of Cards (Raymond Tusk (Gerald McRaney))
- Indiana Jones and the Temple of Doom (Chattar Lal (Roshan Seth))
- Journey to the West: Conquering the Demons (Almighty Foot (Zhang Chao Li))
- Last Vegas (Patrick "Paddy" Connors (Robert De Niro))
- Never Say Never Again (1985 Fuji TV edition) (M (Edward Fox))
- The Meyerowitz Stories (Harold Meyerowitz (Dustin Hoffman))
- Mission: Impossible (1999 Fuji TV edition) (Jim Phelps (Jon Voight))
- Murphy Brown (Jim Dial (Charles Kimbrough))
- National Lampoon's Christmas Vacation (Clark Griswold (Chevy Chase))
- Pork Chop Hill (1972 TV Asahi edition) (Private Forstman (Harry Guardino))
- The Producers (Leopold "Leo" Bloom (Gene Wilder))
- Project ALF (Colonel Gilbert Milfoil (Martin Sheen))
- Race with the Devil (Frank Stewart (Warren Oates))
- Screamers (2000 Fuji TV edition) (Commander Joseph A. Hendricksson (Peter Weller))
- Sledge Hammer! (Sledge Hammer (David Rasche))
- Somewhere in Time (2021 BS Tokyo edition) (William Fawcett Robinson (Christopher Plummer))
- Spaceballs (President Skroob / Yogurt (Mel Brooks))
- Speed (1997 Fuji TV edition) (Detective Harry Temple (Jeff Daniels))
- Star Trek series (Q (John de Lancie))
- Star Wars: Episode II – Attack of the Clones (Count Dooku (Christopher Lee))
- Star Wars: Episode III – Revenge of the Sith (Count Dooku (Christopher Lee))
- Teenage Mutant Ninja Turtles II: The Secret of the Ooze (Splinter)
- Ted (Sam J. Jones)
- Ted 2 (Sam J. Jones)
- Tomorrow Never Dies (2002 TV Asahi edition) (Elliot Carver (Jonathan Pryce))
- True Lies (1996 Fuji TV edition) (Albert Mike Gibson (Tom Arnold))
- Uncommon Valor (1987 NTV edition) (Harry MacGregor (Robert Stack))
- The Untouchables (Agt. William Youngfellow (Abel Fernandez))
- Wanted (2019 BS Japan edition) (Pekwarsky (Terence Stamp))

==== Animation ====
- Balto (Boris)
- Fun and Fancy Free (Edgar Bergen)
- Kubo and the Two Strings (Raiden the Moon King)
- The Lego Movie (Vitruvius, Gandalf, Pa Cop)
- Migration (Dan)
- Space Ghost (Space Ghost)
- Star Trek: Lower Decks (Q)
- Star Wars: The Clone Wars (Count Dooku)

== Awards ==
| Year | Award | Category | Result | Ref. |
|---|---|---|---|---|
| 2008 | 2nd Seiyu Awards | Achievement Award | Won | |
| 2021 | Tokyo Anime Awards 2021 | Merit Award | Won | |
