= Crayon Shin-chan: Fierceness That Invites Storm! The Battle of the Warring States =

- Theatrical release poster

Japanese name
- Kanji: クレヨンしんちゃん 嵐を呼ぶ アッパレ!戦国大合戦
Transcriptions
- Revised Hepburn: Kureyon Shinchan: Arashi o Yobu: Appare! Sengoku Daikassen
- Directed by: Keiichi Hara
- Screenplay by: Keiichi Hara
- Starring: Akiko Yajima; Miki Narahashi; Keiji Fujiwara; Satomi Kōrogi; Yusaku Yara; Ai Kobayashi; Michio Hazama; Chikao Ōtsuka; Kazuhiro Yamaji
- Production company: Shin-Ei Animation
- Distributed by: Toho
- Release date: April 20, 2002
- Running time: 95 minutes
- Country: Japan
- Language: Japanese

Crayon Shin-chan: Fierceness That Invites Storm! The Battle of the Warring States (クレヨンしんちゃん 嵐を呼ぶ アッパレ!戦国大合戦, Kureyon Shinchan: Arashi o Yobu: Appare! Sengoku Daikassen) is a 2002 anime film. It is the 10th film based on the popular comedy manga and anime series Crayon Shin-chan. The film was released to theatres on April 20, 2002, in Japan. It is the final film in the series to use traditional cel animation, and the last film to be written and directed by frequent director and animator of the saga Keiichi Hara.

The film was produced by Shin-Ei Animation, the studio behind the anime television. Its only screening in the US was on April 26, 2014, in Japanese with English subtitles as Crayon Shin Chan: Bravo! Samurai Battle! at the Embassy of Japan. It was released as Crayon Shinchan The Movie: Battle in the Daimyo Era with English subtitles on VCD and DVD by PMP Entertainment.

A Japanese live-action movie based on this movie called Ballad: Song of a Nameless Love (BALLAD 名もなき恋のうた) was released in 2009.

== Cast ==
- Akiko Yajima - Shinnosuke Nohara
- Keiji Fujiwara - Hiroshi Nohara
- Miki Narahashi - Misae Nohara
- Satomi Kōrogi - Himawari Nohara
- Mari Mashiba - Toru Kazama and Shiro
- Tamao Hayashi - Nene Sakurada
- Teiyū Ichiryūsai - Masao Sato
- Chie Satō - Bo Suzuki
- Yusaku Yara - Yoshitoshi Matabe Ijiri
- Ai Kobayashi - Ren Kasuga
- Michio Hazama - Yasutsuna
- Chikao Ōtsuka - Yorihisa
- Kazuhiro Yamaji - Takatora Ōkurai
- Kenichi Ogata - Niemon
- Noriko Uemura - Osato
- Keiko Yamamoto - Yoshino
- Hiroyuki Miyasako (Ameagari Kesshitai) - Hikozo
- Tōru Hotohara (Ameagari Kesshitai) - Gisuke
- Rokurō Naya - Tadatsugu
- Tesshō Genda - Hayato
- Hidenari Ugaki - Gonbe Sakuma
- Fumihiko Tachiki - Naotaka Magara Tarozaemon

== Reception ==
Out of all the long-running anime film franchises (Detective Conan, Doraemon, One Piece, Dragon Ball, Pokémon, etc.), it is the only anime film to ever win Grand Prize in the Japan Media Arts Festival Animation Division, even within the Crayon Shin Chan series.

Writer Kazuki Nakashima of Gurren Lagann fame also praised this film, even calling it a 'masterpiece'.

== Accolades ==
Awards
Year	Award	Category	Recipients and nominees	Result
2002	Japan Media Arts Festival	Animation Awards	Crayon Shin-chan: Fierceness That Invites Storm! The Battle of the Warring States	Won
2002	Animation Kobe	Individual Award	Keiichi Hara	Won
2002	Mainichi Film Award	Best Animation Film	Crayon Shin-chan: Fierceness That Invites Storm! The Battle of the Warring States	Won
2003	Tokyo Anime Award	Best Director	Keiichi Hara	Won
2003	Tokyo Anime Award	Domestic Feature Film	Crayon Shin-chan: Fierceness That Invites Storm! The Battle of the Warring States	Nominated

== See also ==
- Crayon Shin-chan
- Yoshito Usui
- Sengoku Period
