= Chie Satō =

Japanese voice actress (born 1964)

- Born: Chie Saito (斎藤 智恵); July 1, 1964 (age 62); Saitama, Japan
- Occupation: Voice actress
- Years active: 1985–present
- Agent: Aoni Production
- Website: Official profile

Chie Satō (佐藤 智恵, Satō Chie), also stylized as Chie Satou, is a Japanese voice actress affiliated with Aoni Production.

She has appeared in numerous anime series, being most well known for her roles as various characters in the Pokémon television anime series and as the titular character Shinnosuke's close friend Bo-chan in the Crayon Shin-chan television anime series.

== Roles ==
* Bolded names indicate a major role in the work

=== Anime (film) ===
- Seigi Choujin vs. Ancient Choujin (1985) - Preschooler C
- Dragon Ball Z: Bardock – The Father of Goku (1990) - Saiya-jin C
- Crayon Shin-chan: Action Kamen vs Leotard Devil (1993) - Bo-chan
- Crayon Shin-chan: The Secret Treasure of Buri Buri Kingdom (1994) - Bo-chan
- Dr. Slump and Arale-chan: Hoyoyo!! Follow the Rescued Shark... (1994) - Unlisted
- Crayon Shin-chan: Unkokusai's Ambition (1995) - Bo-chan
- Marmalade Boy (1995) - Gastman Omega
- Crayon Shin-chan: Adventure in Henderland (1996) - Bo-chan
- Crayon Shin-chan: Pursuit of the Balls of Darkness (1997) - Bo-chan
- Crayon Shin-chan: Blitzkrieg! Pig's Hoof's Secret Mission (1998) - Bo-chan
- Crayon Shin-chan: Explosion! The Hot Spring's Feel Good Final Battle/Kureshin Paradise! Made in Saitama (1999) - Bo-chan
- Crayon Shin-chan: The Storm Called The Jungle (2000) - Bo-chan
- Crayon Shin-chan: The Storm Called: The Adult Empire Strikes Back (2001) - Bo-chan
- Crayon Shin-chan: The Storm Called: The Battle of the Warring States (2002) - Bo-chan
- Crayon Shin-chan: The Storm Called: Yakiniku Road of Honor (2003) - Bo-chan
- Odoru Pokémon Himitsu Kichi (2003) - Habuneku
- Crayon Shin-chan: The Storm Called: The Kasukabe Boys of the Evening Sun (2004) - Bo-chan
- Crayon Shin-chan: The Legend Called Buri Buri 3 Minutes Charge (2005) - Bo-chan
- Pocket Monsters Advanced Generation the Movie - Mew and the Wave Hero: Lucario (2005) - Haruka's Gonbe (May's Munchlax); Beroringa (Lickitung)
- Crayon Shin-chan: The Legend Called: Dance! Amigo! (2006) - Bo-chan
- Pocket Monsters Advanced Generation the Movie - Pokémon Ranger and the Prince of the Sea: Manaphy (2006) - Haruka's Gonbe (May's Munchlax)
- Crayon Shin-chan: The Storm Called: The Singing Buttocks Bomb (2007) - Bo-chan
- Crayon Shin-chan: The Storm Called: The Hero of Kinpoko (2008) - **Bo-chan**
- Pocket Monsters Diamond & Pearl the Movie - Giratina and the Sky's Bouquet: Shaymin (2008) - Ogin; Hikari's Etebosu (Dawn's Ambipom)
- Crayon Shin-chan: Roar! Kasukabe Animal Kingdom (2009) - **Bo-chan**

=== Anime (OAV) ===
- Mobile Suit Gundam 0080: War in the Pocket (1989) - Reception
- Roujin Z (1991) - Nobuko Ohe
- Fight!! Spirit of the Sword (1993) - Young Yonosuke

=== Anime (TV show) ===
- GeGeGe no Kitaro Series 3 (1985) - Unlisted
- High School! Kimengumi (1985) - Toiyo Matsumo
- Saint Seiya (1986) - Young Hyouga (ep 21); Young Nachi
- Bikkuriman (1987) - Alibaba Shintei
- Kiteretsu Daihyakka (1988) - Konchi (2nd Voice); Otonashi (1st Voice)
- Dragon Quest (1989) - Young Abel
- Himitsu no Akko-chan: Umi da! Obake da!! Natsu Matsuri (1989) - Goma
- Transformers: Victory (1989) - Sam (ep 6)
- My Daddy Long Legs (1990) - **Sally McBride**
- Mashin Hero Wataru 2 (1990) - Niboshi Obaasan
- Getter Robo Go (1991) - Daifou Tetsu
- Moero! Top Striker (1991) - Makaroni
- Zettai Muteki Raijin-Oh (1991) - Tokie Sakai; Yoshiaki Ogawa
- Floral Magician Mary Bell (1992) - Bongo
- Mikan Enikki (1992) - Taichi
- Pretty Soldier Sailor Moon (1992) - Hosenka (ep 24)
- Shin-chan (1992) - **Bo-chan**
- Nintama Rantarō (1993) - Isuke
- Little Women II: Jo's Boys (1993) - Stuffy
- Pig Girl of Love and Courage: Tonde Burin (1994) - Masami Yamakawa (4 episodes)
- Marmalade Boy (1994) - Uchiyama
- Captain Tsubasa J (1994) - Ryo Ishizaki (young)
- Metal Fighter Miku (1994) - Amazoness (ep 6); Mad Kong (ep 1)
- Huckleberry Finn Monogatari (1994) - **Jim**
- Bonobono (1995) - Ki no Obake
- GeGeGe no Kitaro Series 4 (1996) - Unlisted
- Remi, Nobody's Girl (1996) - **Joli-Coeur**
- Kaiketsu Zorro (1996) - Casas
- Master Keaton (1998) - Little Connelly (ep 13)
- Yu-Gi-Oh! (1998) - Childhood Kaiba (ep 20)
- Pocket Monsters Advanced Generation (2002) - Haruka's Gonbe (May's Munchlax); Musashi's Habunake (Jessie's Seviper); Yasue Kachinuki (ep 46)
- Pocket Monsters Side Stories (2002) - Masae (ep 14)
- Tsuribaka Nisshi (2002) - Sasaki's Wife
- Baby Baachan (2004) - Yone-san
- Melody of Oblivion (2004) - Monokeros #4
- Ragnarok the Animation (2004) - Maria
- Pocket Monsters Diamond and Pearl (2006) - Haruka's Gonbe (May's Munchlax); Hikari's Eteboth (Dawn's Ambipom); Musashi's Habunake (Jessie's Seviper); Shinji's Yamikarasu (Paul's Murkrow)
- GeGeGe no Kitaro Series 5 (2007) - Junpei (ep 10); Tatsumi Ioyama (ep 29)
- Hatara Kizzu Maihamu Gumi (2007) - Large God house housekeeping lady (ep 3)
- Mokke (2007) - Hiyoshi's aunt (ep 4)
- Oh! Edo Rocket (2007) - Rokube's wife
- To Love-Ru (2008) - Gi Buri's wife (ep 6)
- Yōkai Watch (2014) - Kanchi

=== Dubbing ===
- Painted Faces, Child Yuen Biao
