= Chikao Ohtsuka =

Japanese actor and narrator (1929–2015)

- 大塚 周夫
- Born: July 5, 1929; Setagaya, Tokyo City, Tokyo Prefecture, Empire of Japan
- Died: January 15, 2015 (aged 85); Shinjuku, Tokyo, Japan
- Occupations: Actor; voice actor; narrator
- Years active: 1948–2015
- Agent: Aoni Production
- Children: Akio Ōtsuka (son)
- Website: Official profile

Chikao Ohtsuka (大塚 周夫, Ōtsuka Chikao; July 5, 1929 – January 15, 2015) was a Japanese actor, voice actor, and narrator.

== Career ==
He was most known for the roles of Captain Hook (Peter Pan: The Animated Series and Disney's Peter Pan), Dick Dastardly (Wacky Races and Dastardly and Muttley in Their Flying Machines), Goemon Ishikawa XIII (Lupin III), Nezumi Otoko (GeGeGe no Kitaro), Denzō Yamada (Nintama Rantarō), Professor Moriarty (Sherlock Hound), Jagi (Fist of the North Star), Doctor Ivo "Eggman" Robotnik and Professor Gerald Robotnik (Sonic the Hedgehog series), Gol D. Roger (One Piece), Xehanort (Kingdom Hearts series), Dr. Weil (Mega Man Zero), Taopaipai (Dragon Ball), Piedmon and Apocalymon (Digimon), and Wario in his commercials. He was the official dubbing artist of Charles Bronson and Richard Widmark. At the time of his death, he was attached to Aoni Production.

He was the father of Akio Otsuka. They occasionally performed together, such as in Black Jack 21, Mobile Suit Gundam 0083: Stardust Memory, the Kingdom Hearts series, the Full Metal Panic! series, and Metal Gear Solid 4: Guns of the Patriots.

== Death ==
Ōtsuka died from ischemic heart failure on January 15, 2015, at the age of 85.

== Filmography ==
=== Television drama ===
- Minamoto no Yoshitsune (1966) (Fujiwara no Tadakiyo)
- Tokugawa Ieyasu (1983) (Natsume Harusada)
- Sanga Moyu (1984) (Tazawa)
- Kitaro ga Mita Gyokusai - Mizuki Shigeru no Senso (2007) (Nezumi Otoko's voice)

=== Television animation ===
1960s

- Astro Boy (1963) (President Hira, Nubo)
- GeGeGe no Kitarō (1968) (Nezumi-Otoko)

1970s

- Ashita no Joe (1971) (Goromaki Gondō)
- GeGeGe no Kitarō (1971) (Nezumi-Otoko)
- Lupin III (1971) (Goemon Ishikawa XIII)
- Babel II (1973) (Yomi)
- Gamba no Bōken (1975) (Noroi)

1980s

- King Arthur: Prince on White Horse (1980) (Bossman)
- Sherlock Hound (1984) (Professor Moriarty)
- Dragon Ball (1987) (Taopaipai)
- Akakage (1987) (Koga)
- Oishinbo (1988) (Yūzan Kaibara)
- Peter Pan: The Animated Series (1989) (Captain Hook)

1990s

- Nintama Rantarō (1993) (Denzō Yamada)
- Kindaichi Case Files (1996) (Keitaro Kiyomasa)
- Cowboy Bebop (1998) (Doctor Londes)
- Master Keaton (1998) (Andre Semonofu)
- Yu-Gi-Oh! (1998) (LeDolly Sheldon)
- Digimon Adventure (1999) (Piedmon, Apocalymon)
- Kamikaze Kaito Jeanne (1999) (Police Chief Mikuri)
- One Piece (1999) (Gol D. Roger) (2021 – archived audio, episode 1000; 2024 – archived audio, One Piece Fan Letter)

2000s

- Beyblade series (2000–2003) (Ryūnosuke Kinomiya)
- Najica Blitz Tactics (2001) (Ricardo Caidell)
- Vandread (2001) (Jin)
- The Galaxy Railways (2003) (Station Master Arvent)
- Hellsing (2003) (Arthur Hellsing ((tenth episode))
- Rumic Theater (2003) (Domoto)
- Sonic X (2003) (Doctor Eggman, Professor Gerald Robotnik)
- Wolf's Rain (2003) (Shopkeeper)
- Area 88 (2004) (Grandfather McCoy)
- Gokusen (2004) (Yakuza Boss Ryūichirō Kuroda)
- Full Metal Panic!: The Second Raid (2005) (Lord Mallory)
- Monster (2005) (Mikhail Ivanovich Petrov)
- The Law of Ueki (2005–2006) (Ogre)
- Tsubasa: Reservoir Chronicle (2005–2006) (Tanbaru)
- Ayakashi (2006) (Yoshiyuki Sakai)
- Spider Riders (2006) (Braid)
- Mobile Suit Gundam 00 (2007) (Aeolia Schenberg)
- El Cazador de la Bruja (2007) (Enrike)
- Les Misérables: Shōjo Cosette (2007) (Bishop Myriel)
- Hakaba Kitaro (2008) (Nezumi-Otoko)
- Slayers Revolution (2008) (Pirate Captain)

2010s

- Nurarihyon no Mago (2010) (Nurarihyon)
- Nurarihyon no Mago: Sennen Makyou (2011) (Nurarihyon)
- Future Card Buddyfight (2014) (Drum Bunker Dragon Father)

=== OVA ===
- Area 88 (1985–1986) (Nguyen Van Chom)
- Armored Trooper Votoms (1985) (Yoran Pailsen)
- Legend of the Galactic Heroes (1988) (Rudolf von Goldenbaum)
- Mobile Suit Gundam 0083: Stardust Memory (1991) (Eiphar Synapse)
- Ushio and Tora (1992) (Tora)
- JoJo's Bizarre Adventure (1993) (Joseph Joestar)
- Black Jack (1993) (Crossword)
- Ruin Explorers (1995) (Galf)
- Bio Hunter (1995) (Bokuda)
- Hellsing Ultimate (2006) (Abraham Van Helsing)

=== Theatrical animation ===
- Do It! Yasuji's Pornorama (1971) (Manager)
- Phoenix 2772 (1980) (Ban)
- Night on the Galactic Railroad (1985) (Birdcatcher)
- Arion (1986) (Hades)
- Dragon Ball: Mystical Adventure (1988) (Tao Pai Pai)
- Little Nemo: Adventures in Slumberland (1989) (Flip)
- Bonobono (1993) (Araiguma-kun's father)
- Pokémon: The Movie 2000 (1999) (Tobias)
- Crayon Shin-chan: The Storm Called: The Kasukabe Boys of the Evening Sun (2004) (O'Reilly)
- Doraemon: Nobita and the Green Giant Legend (2008) (Shiraa)

=== Video games ===
Year	Title	Role	Notes	Source
1998	Panzer Dragoon Saga	The Seventh Emperor		
1998	Sakura Wars 2: Thou Shalt Not Die	Tadayoshi Kanzaki		
1998	Sonic Adventure	Dr. Eggman		
2001	Sonic Adventure 2	Dr. Eggman, Gerald Robotnik		
2002	Kingdom Hearts	Captain Hook		
2003	Sonic Heroes	Dr. Eggman		
2004	Xenosaga Episode II: Jenseits von Gut und Böse	Pope Sergius XVII		
2005	Mega Man Zero 4	Dr. Weil		
2005	Shadow the Hedgehog	Dr. Eggman, Gerald Robotnik		
2005	Sonic Rush	Dr. Eggman, Eggman Nega		
2006	Final Fantasy XII	Dr. Cid		
2006	Sonic the Hedgehog	Dr. Eggman		
2007	Lost Odyssey	King Gohtza		
2008	Valkyria Chronicles	Berthold Gregor		
2008	Metal Gear Solid 4: Guns of the Patriots	Big Boss		
2008	Sonic Unleashed	Dr. Eggman		
2010	Kingdom Hearts Birth by Sleep	Master Xehanort		
2010	Sonic Colors	Dr. Eggman		
2011	Tales of Xillia	Maxwell		
2011	Sonic Generations	Dr. Eggman, Classic Eggman		
2012	Kingdom Hearts 3D: Dream Drop Distance	Master Xehanort		
2012	Dead or Alive 5	Gen Fu		
2013	Sonic Lost World	Dr. Eggman		
2014	Granblue Fantasy	Aletheia		
2016	Mario & Sonic at the Rio 2016 Olympic Games	Eggman Nega	Posthumous release	
2019	Kingdom Hearts III	Master Xehanort	Posthumous release	
2019	Mario & Sonic at the Olympic Games Tokyo 2020	Eggman Nega	Archived recordings, posthumous release	
2020	Sonic at the Olympic Games (2020)	Eggman Nega	Archived recordings, posthumous release	

- Asura's Wrath (Kalrow)
- BS Super Mario USA Power Challenge (King)
- Bushido Blade (Utsusemi)
- Dead or Alive: Dimensions (Gen Fu)
- Dead or Alive 5 Ultimate (Gen Fu)
  - Dead or Alive 5 Last Round (Gen Fu)
- Dragon Ball Z: Budokai Tenkaichi series (Taopaipai)
- Excitebike: Bun Bun Mario Battle Stadium (Wario)
- Kingdom Hearts: Chain of Memories (Captain Hook)
- Kingdom Hearts Re: Chain of Memories (Captain Hook)
- Minnesota Fats: Pool Legend (Minnesota Fats, Sega Saturn version)
- No More Heroes: Heroes' Paradise (Dr. Peace)
- Shining Force EXA (Gantetsu)
- Tales of Xillia 2 (Maxwell)
- Tech Romancer (Goldibus)
- Tekken 5/Dark Resurrection (Jinpachi Mishima, Scientist in Ling Xiaoyu's Ending)
- Tekken Revolution (Jinpachi Mishima)
- Tekken Tag Tournament 2 (Jinpachi Mishima)
- Tekken Tag Tournament 2 Unlimited (Jinpachi Mishima)
- Tekken Tag Tournament 2: Wii U Edition (Jinpachi Mishima)
- Tenchu: Wrath of Heaven (Tenrai)

=== Commercials ===
- Coca-Cola Oolong (Narration)
- Hitachi, Ltd. Fax
- Nippon Telegraph and Telephone
- Sony Ericsson SO702i mobile phone (Narration)
- Super Mario Land 2: 6 Golden Coins (Wario)
- Wario (Wario)

=== Dubbing roles ===
==== Live-action ====
Charles Bronson

- Vera Cruz (Pittsburgh)
- The Magnificent Seven (1974 TV Asahi edition) (Bernardo O'Reilly)
- A Thunder of Drums (TBS edition) (Trooper Hanna)
- Kid Galahad (Lew Nyack)
- The Great Escape (1971 Fuji TV edition) (Danny Tunnel King)
- Battle of the Bulge (1973 TV Asahi and 1978 Fuji TV editions) (Maj. Wolenski)
- Combat! (Velasquez)
- The Sandpiper (Cos Erickson)
- This Property Is Condemned (1975 Nippon TV edition) (J.J. Nichols)
- Adieu l'ami (Fuji TV edition) (Franz Propp)
- La Bataille de San Sebastian (Teclo)
- Once Upon a Time in the West (Harmonica)
- Villa Rides (Fuji TV edition) (Rodolfo Fierro)
- Lola (Scott Wardman)
- Violent City (1974 TV Asahi and 1985 TBS editions) (Jeff Heston)
- Cold Sweat (1979 Nippon TV edition) (Joe Martin)
- Rider on the Rain (1977 Nippon TV edition) (Dobbs)
- You Can't Win 'Em All (Fuji TV edition) (Josh Corey)
- Red Sun (TV Tokyo edition) (Link Stuart)
- The Valachi Papers (Nippon TV and TV Asahi edition) (Joe Valachi)
- Chino (1979 TV Asahi edition) (Chino Valdez)
- The Stone Killer (TV Asahi edition) (Lou Torrey)
- Death Wish (1980 TV Asahi edition) (Paul Kersey)
- Breakheart Pass (Deakin)
- Breakout (1981 TV Asahi edition) (Nick Colton)
- Hard Times (1981 TV Asahi edition) (Chaney)
- St. Ives (TV Asahi and Fuji TV editions) (St. Ives)
- Raid on Entebbe (1989 Fuji TV edition) (Brig. Gen Dan Shomron)
- Telefon (Bortsov)
- Borderline (TV Tokyo edition) (Jeb Maynard)
- Death Wish II (Nippon TV and TV Asahi editions) (Paul Kersey)
- 10 to Midnight (1985 TV Asahi edition) (Leo Kessler)
- The Evil That Men Do (Holland / Bart Smith)
- Death Wish 3 (1988 TV Asahi edition) (Paul Kersey)
- Murphy's Law (Fuji TV edition) (Murphy)
- Death Wish 4: The Crackdown (1991 TV Asahi edition) (Paul Kersey)
- Messenger of Death (TV Asahi edition) (Garret Smith)
- Death Wish V: The Face of Death (1996 TV Tokyo edition) (Paul Kersey)
- A Family of Cops (Paul Fein)
- Family of Cops 3 (Paul Fein)

Richard Widmark

- Kiss of Death (Fuji TV edition) (Tommy Udo)
- The Street with No Name (1969 TV Asashi edition) (Alec Stiles)
- Yellow Sky (Dude)
- Panic in the Streets (1970 TV Asashi edition) (Lt. Cmdr. "Clint" Reed M.D.)
- Night and the City (Harry Fabian)
- The Frogmen (Lt. Cmdr. John Lawrence)
- Halls of Montezuma (1970 TBS and 1974 Fuji TV editions) (Lt. Anderson)
- Don't Bother to Knock (Jed Towers)
- Red Skies of Montana (1970 TBS edition) (Cliff Mason)
- Destination Gobi (CPO Samuel T. McHale)
- Take the High Ground! (Sgt. Thorne Ryan)
- Broken Lance (1969 TV Asashi edition) (Ben Devereaux)
- Garden of Evil (1969 TV Asashi edition) (Fiske)
- Hell and High Water (1969 TBS edition) (Adam Jones)
- The Cobweb (Dr. Stewart McIver)
- A Prize of Gold (1969 TBS edition) (Sergeant Joe Lawrence)
- The Last Wagon (1963 Nippon TV and 1973 Fuji TV editions) (Comanche Todd)
- Run for the Sun (1967 TV Asashi and 1973 TBS editions) (Michael Latimer)
- The Law and Jake Wade (Clint Hollister)
- The Tunnel of Love (1972 TV Tokyo edition) (August 'Augie' Poole)
- The Trap (Ralph Anderson)
- Warlock (1969 and 1980 TV Asashi editions) (Johnny Gannon)
- The Alamo (TBS edition) (Jim Bowie)
- Judgment at Nuremberg (Col. Tad Lawson)
- The Secret Ways (Michael Reynolds)
- Two Rode Together (First Lieutenant Jim Gary)
- Cheyenne Autumn (Captain Thomas Archer)
- Flight from Ashiya (L:t. Col. Glenn Stevenson)
- The Long Ships (Rolfe)
- The Bedford Incident (Captain Eric Finlander U.S.N.)
- Alvarez Kelly (1973 TV Asashi edition) (Colonel Tom Rossiter)
- The Way West (Lije Evans)
- Madigan (1978 TV Asashi edition (Det. Daniel Madigan))
- Death of a Gunfighter (1974 Fuji TV edition) (Frank Patch)
- A Talent for Loving (TV Tokyo edition) (Major Patten)
- The Moonshine War (TV Tokyo edition) (Dr. Taulbee)
- When the Legends Die (TBS edition) (Red Dillon)
- Brock's Last Case (Lieutenant Max Brock)
- Murder on the Orient Express (Mr. Ratchett)
- The Last Day (NHK edition) (Will Spence)
- The Sell Out (TV Asashi edition) (Sam Lucas)
- To the Devil a Daughter (John Verney)
- The Domino Principle (Tagge)
- Twilight's Last Gleaming (1979 TV Tokyo edition) (Gen. Martin MacKenzie)
- Coma (Dr. George Harris)
- The Swarm (General Thaddeus Slater)
- Bear Island (1985 TV Asashi edition) (Otto Gerran)
- Hanky Panky (Ransom)
- Who Dares Wins (Secretary of State Arthur Currie)
- Against All Odds (1987 Fuji TV edition) (Ben Caxton)
- True Colors (Sen. James Stiles)

Jack Palance

- Attack (Lt. Joe Costa)
- Contempt (Jeremy Prokosch)
- Kill a Dragon (Rick Masters)
- They Came to Rob Las Vegas (Douglas)
- Young Guns (Lawrence Murphy)
- Batman (1995 TV Asashi edition) (Carl Grissom)
- Tango & Cash (1993 TV Asashi edition) (Yves Perret)
- Solar Crisis (Travis)
- City Slickers (Curly Washburn)
- City Slickers II: The Legend of Curly's Gold (Duke Washburn)
- Cops & Robbersons (Jake Stone)

Chuck Connors

- The Big Country (Buck Hannassey)
- Soylent Green (Fielding)
- 99 and 44/100% Dead (Marvin 'Claw' Zuckerman)
- Tourist Trap (Mr. Slausen)
- Virus (Captain McCloud)

Peter Sellers

- Lolita (Clare Quilty)
- Dr. Strangelove (TV edition) (Dr. Strangelove)
- The Pink Panther (1973 TV Asashi edition) (Inspector Jacques Clouseau)
- A Shot in the Dark (1970 TV Asashi edition) (Jacques Clouseau)
- The World of Henry Orient (Henry Orient)

R. Lee Ermey

- Leaving Las Vegas (Conventioneer)
- Seven (Police Captain)
- The Texas Chainsaw Massacre (Sheriff Hoyt)
- The Texas Chainsaw Massacre: The Beginning (Sheriff Hoyt)

Others

- 12 Angry Men (Juror #7 (Jack Warden))
- The Addams Family (Lurch (Ted Cassidy)
- Addams Family Reunion (Lurch (Carel Struycken)
- ALF (Trevor Ochmonek (John LaMotta))
- Batman (TV series) (Penguin (Burgess Meredith))
- Beverly Hills Cop (1988 TV Asahi edition) (Sergeant John Taggart (John Ashton))
- The Big Brawl (Herbert (Mako))
- The Big Lebowski (Blu-Ray edition) (The Stranger (Sam Elliott))
- Blade (2001 TV Tokyo edition) (Abraham Whistler (Kris Kristofferson))
- The Bourne Ultimatum (Dr. Albert Hirsch (Albert Finney))
- Children of Men (Jasper Palmer (Michael Caine))
- A Christmas Carol (Ebeneezer Scrooge (Patrick Stewart))
- Contact (S.R. Hadden (John Hurt))
- Cop Land (Ray Donlan (Harvey Keitel))
- Creepshow 2 (The Creep (Tom Savini / Joe Silver))
- The Dark Crystal (SkekUng (Michael Kilgarriff) (puppeteered by (Dave Goelz))
- Doomsday (Bill Nelson (Bob Hoskins))
- Downfall (Adolf Hitler (Bruno Ganz))
- Dragon Lord (Dragon's Father (Tien Feng))
- Fire Down Below (2000 TV Asahi edition) (Orin Hanner, Sr. (Kris Kristofferson))
- From Dusk till Dawn (Jacob Fuller (Harvey Keitel))
- The Great Silence (1972 TV Asahi edition) (Loco (Klaus Kinski))
- The Good, the Bad and the Ugly (Tuco (Eli Wallach))
- Jack Reacher (The Zec (Werner Herzog))
- Kolchak: The Night Stalker (Carl Kolchak (Darren McGavin))
- Lawrence of Arabia (1981 TV Asahi edition) (Prince Faisal (Alec Guinness))
- Lincoln (Abraham Lincoln (Daniel Day-Lewis))
- Little Nicky (Satan (Harvey Keitel))
- Look at Me (Étienne Cassard (Jean-Pierre Bacri))
- Mad Max Beyond Thunderdome (1988 Fuji TV edition) (Dr. Dealgood (Edwin Hodgeman))
- Masters of the Universe (1992 TV Asahi edition) (Skeletor (Frank Langella))
- Memories of Murder (Sergeant Koo Hee-bong (Byun Hee-bong))
- The Mummy (Dr. Allan Chamberlain (Jonathan Hyde))
- One Armed Boxer (Chao Liu)
- The Pink Panther (Inspector Clouseau (Peter Sellers))
- The Plague of the Zombies (Squire Clive Hamilton (John Carson))
- The Quiet American (Thomas Fowler (Michael Caine))
- The Score (Max (Marlon Brando))
- Secondhand Lions (TV edition) (Hub (Robert Duvall))
- Snow White and the Huntsman (Muir (Bob Hoskins))
- Snowpiercer (Gilliam (John Hurt))
- Space Cowboys (Tank Sullivan (James Garner))
- The Spy Who Loved Me (TBS Version 2) (Karl Stromberg (Curd Jürgens)
- The Storyteller (The Storyteller (John Hurt)
- Texas, Adios (Cisco Delgado (José Suarez))
- Turbulence (Aldo Hines (Héctor Elizondo))
- Wall Street: Money Never Sleeps (Julius "Julie" Steinhardt (Eli Wallach))
- The Young Victoria (King William IV (Jim Broadbent))

==== Animation ====
- The Adventures of Ichabod and Mr. Toad (Winkie)
- Alice in Wonderland (The Cheshire Cat) (1979 TBS Dub)
- The Black Cauldron (The Creeper)
- Dastardly and Muttley in Their Flying Machines (Dick Dastardly)
- The Fox and the Hound (Amos Slade)
- The Fox and the Hound 2 (Amos Slade)
- The Great Mouse Detective (Fidget)
- Mulan (Fa Zhou)
- Mulan II (Fa Zhou)
- Peter Pan (Captain Hook) (1983 TBS and 1984 Dubs)
- Pinocchio (Stromboli) (1983 dub)
- Toy Story series (Hamm)
- Wacky Races (Dick Dastardly)
- Wacky Races (Dick Dastardly) (Archived audio)
- Yellow Submarine (Chief Blue Meanie)
- Once Upon a Studio (Stromboli) (Archived audio)
