= Crayon Shin-chan: Fierceness That Invites Storm! The Kasukabe Boys of the Evening Sun =

2004 film by Tsutomu Mizushima

- Theatrical release poster
- Directed by: Tsutomu Mizushima
- Written by: Tsutomu Mizushima
- Starring: Akiko Yajima; Miki Narahashi; Keiji Fujiwara; Satomi Kōrogi; Mari Mashiba; Tamao Hayashi; Teiyū Ichiryūsai; Chie Satō; Osamu Kobayashi; Chikao Ōtsuka
- Production company: Shin-Ei Animation
- Distributed by: Toho
- Release date: April 17, 2004
- Running time: 96 minutes
- Country: Japan
- Language: Japanese
- Box office: $10,798,618

Crayon Shin-chan: Fierceness That Invites Storm! The Kasukabe Boys of the Evening Sun (クレヨンしんちゃん 嵐を呼ぶ!夕陽のカスカベボーイズ, Kureyon Shinchan: Arashi o Yobu! Yūhi no Kasukabe Bōizu), also known as Shin Chan the Western: the Adventures of the Kasukabe Boys, is a 2004 anime film. It is the 12th film based on the popular comedy manga and anime series Crayon Shin-chan. The film was released to theatres on April 17, 2004, in Japan. It was released as Crayon Shinchan The Movie: Evening Sun Kasukabe Boys with English subtitles on VCD and DVD by PMP Entertainment.

The film was produced by Shin-Ei Animation, the studio behind the anime television.

== Plot ==
One day while playing a game, Shinnouske and his friends discover a theatre. While they were about to watch it, Shin-chan wanted to go to the washroom. When he returned, all of his friends were not there, which at first, made him think that they had gone back home without him. But back home he found out that none of his friends had returned home. He tells his parents about the theatre and they all decide to go to the theatre. The Nohara family leave their dog, Shiro in the house and leave. When they reach the theatre and watch the film, they are taken away by a bright flash of light and find themselves in the Old West of America. Soon they find that they are a part of the film.

They come across Kazama, who has become a policeman of that town and is very rude. He also doesn't remember a thing and tries to arrest the Nohara family, but they escape and take shelter in the house of Tsubaki, a cute girl in that town. Soon, Shin-chan and family come across a movie maniac named Micheal, who tells them that whoever watches a film in that theatre, is brought to the film and by staying in that for long time, that person forgets his memory and eventually accepts himself in that film. They see how an old man is always dragged by a horse as a punishment. Shin-chan comes across Masao, who is a househusband and has married Nene, who works as a waitress in a bar. Only Bo chan, an inaractive friend of Shin-chan remembers half of his memory. Meanwhile, the Nohara family also starts accepting themselves in the film, only after finding out that if they want to leave the film, they must complete the film and attain its end. The mayor of the city does not want the film to end and worries about people's eagerness to find its end. Meanwhile, they find out that to make the film end, they have to find the film's heroes. They find that there are five heroes who turn out to be none other Shin-chan and his friends, who soon regain their memory.

They decide to go to the forbidden area where nobody is allowed to go, to find out what the mayor is hiding there. But the mayor and his men chase. Shin-chan and friends turn into the heroes with a completely different attire and making them stronger and faster and attack the mayor and his men with their new powers. The mayor takes control of a robot and captures Tsubaki, but Shin-chan and his friends save her. But their powers are unable to defeat the mayor. When the mayor tilts the train, they use their code word for their team, Kasukabe defence group, fight. With that wings appear in the boy's backs, causing them to fly and with that they defeat the mayor and reach the forbidden area, where They find the hidden thing. The hidden thing was actually "the end", which means that the film has come to an end. The mayor had hidden this so that nobody would be able to complete the film. After that everyone returns to the theatre. Shin-chan tries to find Tsubaki, when his parents and friends realize that Tsubaki was actually a film character and therefore never existed. They comfort Shin-chan when he feels sorry. While Kasukabe Defence Force takes Shin-chan, he hears Shiro barking for him. Shin-chan reunites with Shiro. The movie ends with Shin-chan and his friends and family returning home.

== Cast ==
- Akiko Yajima – Shin-chan
- Keiji Fujiwara – Hiroshi
- Miki Narahashi – Misae
- Satomi Kōrogi – Himawari
- Mari Mashiba – Toru Kazama and Shiro
- Tamao Hayashi – Nene Sakurada
- Teiyū Ichiryūsai – Masao Sato
- Chie Satō – Bo-chan
- Osamu Kobayashi – Chris
- Chikao Ōtsuka – O'Reilly
- Kenji Utsumi – Vin
- Kiyoshi Kobayashi – Justice Love
- Yuu Shimaka – Bar Master

== See also ==
- Crayon Shin-chan
- Yoshito Usui
- The Magnificent Seven
