= Crayon Shin-chan: The Legend Called Buri Buri 3 Minutes Charge =

- Theatrical release poster
- Written by: Hidefumi Kimura
- Starring: Akiko Yajima; Miki Narahashi; Keiji Fujiwara; Satomi Kōrogi
- Production company: Shin-Ei Animation
- Distributed by: Toho
- Release date: April 16, 2005
- Running time: 92 minutes
- Country: Japan
- Language: Japanese

Crayon Shin-chan: The Legend Called Buri Buri 3 Minutes Charge (クレヨンしんちゃん 伝説を呼ぶブリブリ 3分ポッキリ大進撃, Kureyon Shinchan: Densetsu o Yobu Buriburi: Sanpun Pokkiri Daishingeki), also known as The Buri Buri 3-minutes Face-Off, is a 2005 anime film. It is the 13th film based on the popular comedy manga and anime series Crayon Shin-chan. The film was released to theatres on April 16, 2005, in Japan.

The film was produced by Shin-Ei Animation, the studio behind the main Crayon Shin-chan anime television. It was later released on DVD in Japan on November 25, 2005.

== Plot ==
One night, a mysterious giant monster appeared in Kasukabe, crushing the Nohara family without a trace. This was all a dream dreamt by Shinnosuke while holding a soft vinyl monster, Sirimarudashi. After throwing Sirimarudashi, he switches to an action-masked soft vinyl doll and begins to dream another dream. In that dream, Shinnosuke joins forces with the action mask to defeat the monster army and rescue Mimiko, who learns "knowledge of justice" from the action mask.

And in the morning. As usual, Misae cooks breakfast, Hiroshi goes to work, and Shinnosuke goes to kindergarten. However, as usual, Shinnosuke missed the pick-up bus, and Misae decided to send Shinnosuke to kindergarten by bicycle again. Misae, who went home, prepared cup ramen for breakfast, but was tired and just took a nap.

An object that dances in the air while emitting light from the back of the hanging scroll appears there. The illuminant was haunted by the scent of cup ramen and possessed by the Sirimarudashi doll that was lying beside it. However, unfortunately, it was witnessed by Misae Nohara. The object, which is neither binary nor ternary, explained the situation to Misae Nohara, and said that he was a space-time coordinator, " Miraiman, " who came from the future. Originally, he didn't plan to come to the Nohara family, but Miraiman regrets that it was a big deal because he was so hungry that he lost the temptation of cup ramen and was found even when he came here.

The Nohara family was taken to the world three minutes later by Miraiman through the back of the hanging scroll. It leads to the rooftop of a building near Tokyo Tower, and a cocoon-like thing floated above it, and monsters were attacking the city. Miraiman tells that monsters are appearing one after another due to the disturbance of space-time, and if you do not go to the future three minutes later and defeat the monsters, the crisis will become a reality, and ask the family for cooperation. In order to exterminate the monsters, the family confronts the monsters with the ability to freely transform with the power of Miraiman and the heart of justice through the doll of Sirimarudashi where Miraiman resides. Hir

Hiroshi & Misae, enthralled at the prospects of fulfilling their fantasies for three minutes, start spending more time in the other world over their real life & eventually develop symptoms of addiction (akin to video game addiction) and start neglecting their daily life, and Shinnosuke has to take care of the Himawari on behalf of his parents. One morning, the kindergarten teachers who came to pick up Shinnosuke as usual noticed that the Nohara family was strange and tried to hear from Shinnosuke who came to the kindergarten. At that time, there was news that a department store in Kasukabe had partially collapsed and Kazama's mother was involved and injured. At the same time, a dark cloud hangs over Tokyo Tower, and three minutes later, the cocoon of a monster that should be in the other world appears. Shinnosuke hurried back to his house and saw Hiroshi and Misae injured there. A powerful monster that could not be defeated appeared within 3 minutes, and the aftermath of the battle caused damage to the present world. Immediately after that, a more powerful monster appears, and even Hiroshi Nohara throws a spoon if he can't help.

Then, Shinnosuke stands up in order to "get Himawari to become a college student and have her friends introduce her to him wonderfully." Shinnosuke sees a slime-like monster. As Shinnosuke was about to transform, he gets accompanied by Hiroshi, Misae, Himawari and Shiro. Hiroshi and Misae tries to defeat the monster in vain, Shinnosuke goes to defeat the monster. Shinnosuke and his family gets accompanied by Action Mask, Kantam Robo and Sketch of Buriburizaemon. They succeed in defeating the monster. thus neutralizing the space time and the entire Nohara family lead a normal life.

== Cast ==
- Akiko Yajima - Shinnosuke Nohara alias "Shin-chan"
- Keiji Fujiwara - Hiroshi Nohara, father of Shinnosuke and Himawari
- Miki Narahashi - Misae Nohara (née Koyama), mother of Shinnosuke and Himawari
- Satomi Kōrogi - Himawari Nohara, sister of Shinnosuke
- Kunio Murai - Miraiman
- Mari Mashiba as Toru Kazama and Shiro
- Tamao Hayashi as Nene Sakurada
- Teiyū Ichiryūsai as Masao Sato
- Chie Satō as Bo Suzuki alias "Bo-Chan"
- Yumi Takada as Midori Yoshinaga
- Michie Tomizawa as Ume Matsuzaka
- Kotono Mitsuishi as Masumi Ageo
- Rokurō Naya as Bunta Takakura, principal of Futaba Kindergarten

== See also ==
- Crayon Shin-chan
- Yoshito Usui
