= Summer Days with Coo =

Japanese name
- Kanji: 河童のクゥと夏休み
- Literal meaning: Summer Holidays with Coo the Kappa
Transcriptions
- Revised Hepburn: Kappa no Kū to Natsuyasumi
- Directed by: Keiichi Hara
- Screenplay by: Keiichi Hara
- Based on: Kappa Ōsawagi and Kappa Bikkuri Tabi by Masao Kogure
- Music by: Kei Wakakusa
- Production company: Shin-Ei Animation
- Distributed by: Shochiku
- Release date: July 28, 2007 (Japan)
- Running time: 138 minutes
- Country: Japan
- Language: Japanese
- Budget: $3,333,389

Summer Days with Coo (河童のクゥと夏休み, Kappa no Kū to Natsuyasumi; lit. "Summer Holidays with Coo the Kappa") is a 2007 Japanese animated film about a kappa and its impact on an ordinary suburban family, written for the screen and directed by Keiichi Hara based on two novels by Masao Kogure.

== Plot ==
Following a dreadful encounter with a samurai, a young kappa's father is murdered. As he cries, the ground opens up and swallows him whole. 200 years later in modern-day Tokyo, Kōichi Uehara is peer pressured by his friends to pick on the quiet Sayoko Kikuchi, whom they continue to call ugly. Kōichi winds up in a muddy ditch where he finds a stone and within it, the kappa. He takes him home to his family who are awestruck at having a real kappa in their home. They name the kappa Coo, as he has forgotten his real name, and he quickly warms up to the family, though Kōichi's younger sister Hitomi has a strong disdain for him, but slowly she too accepts him. Their pet dog, Ossan, is revealed to be able to communicate with Coo via telepathy, though he tells him not to tell the Ueharas about it.

Coo is spotted in the middle of the night by a couple and soon reports of a kappa sighting is spread throughout Japan. Wanting to know where he came from, Kōichi decides to take a holiday to the country with Coo to see if they can find any clues. They stay in a house where Coo communicates with a Zashiki-warashi (House Spirit Child) who informs him that he is most likely the last kappa as she has not seen anymore. Upon their return home, a couple of journalists ambush Kōichi and snap a picture of Coo. Journalists and photographers begin to camp around the Ueharas' house; practically leaving them no privacy. In an effort to appease them, Kōichi's father Yasuo takes a video of Coo to show to everyone and get various offers. Coo later learns from Ossan that he had a previous owner who loved him, but that one day he started getting beaten up by him due to the stress of school. He ran away before getting adopted by the Ueharas.

Coo agrees to go on television with the Ueharas under the condition that Ossan come as well. On the talk show, they bring out a cryptid expert who resembles the samurai that killed Coo's father (possibly a descendant). He reveals that the samurai claimed the kappa's arm upon getting sliced off. Coo recognizes the arm as his father's and cries before psychically destroying the lights and cameras in the studio. He escapes the studio atop Ossan and flees with the arm with various bystanders in pursuit. During the chase, Ossan is hit by a car and dies. Coo once again uses his abilities to blow up a bird that was planning to eat Ossan before climbing up a radio tower with his father's arm. As he considers killing himself, the sky suddenly begins to rain and a water elemental dragon appears; convincing Coo to keep living. He is rescued shortly afterwards.

Kōichi, who had started to become kinder to Kikuchi thanks to Coo, defends her honor. She later tells him that she is moving away due to her parents divorcing. Upon returning home, his mother Yukari informs him that Coo is leaving after receiving a letter that he claims is in Yokai handwriting. The Ueharas are saddened by the news, but ultimately accept it and have one final day with Coo. Yasuo distracts the paparazzi while Kōichi takes Coo away in a box. He briefly stops by Kikuchi's apartment so that he can show Coo to her and they promise to write to each other when she moves away. Kōichi takes a long and arduous trip to ship Coo away, but is told by him to not be sad as he will visit them one day.

Coo arrives in Okinawa where the recipient is revealed to be a kijimuna, a cousin to the kappa, who saw him on the news and became worried. He promises to teach Coo how to change his appearance before telling him that he can call him Ossan. Coo ventures in the lush greenery of his new surroundings with his father's arm; promising to continue his search for more kappa and to one day see the Ueharas again.

== Characters ==
- Coo (クゥ Kū) – The kappa the whole story revolves around. He is found by Kōichi Uehara, after he had survived over 200 years as a fossil. He then lives with Uehara family.
- Kōichi Uehara (上原康一, Uehara Kōichi) – A fourth grade student. One day he finds a fossil of a baby kappa who survived for 200 years.
- Ossan (オッサン) – The Uehara family dog.

== Other mythical creatures ==
There are other Japanese mythical creatures appearing in the movie:

- A doll-like zashiki warashi, living in a magariya in Iwate Prefecture
- Kijimuna, living in Yanbaru, Okinawa
- A rain or water elemental Asian dragon.

== Cast ==
Character	Japanese voice actor	English voice actor
Coo	Kazato Tomizawa	
Kōichi Uehara	Takahiro Yokokawa	
Yasuo Uehara	Naoki Tanaka	
Yukari Uehara	Naomi Nishida	
Hitomi Uehara	Tamaki Matsumoto	
Ossan	Yoshito Yasuhara	
Sayoko Kikuchi	Natsuki Uematsu	
Zashiki-warashi	Rika Inoue	
The Samurai	Michio Hazama	
Announcer	Akiko Yajima	
Emcee	Keiji Fujiwara	
Kijimuna	Gori	

== Release ==
Over a decade after its debut, the film became widely available in a native English-speaking region for the first time when, in the United States and Canada, it was released direct to home video on January 21, 2020, by GKIDS.

== Reception ==
The film won the Best Animation Film award at the 2008 Mainichi Film Awards and was nominated for Best Animation Film at the 2008 Japanese Academy Awards, and for Best Animated Feature Film at the 2007 Asia Pacific Screen Awards. It also won the Grand Prize for Animation at the 11th Japan Media Arts Festival and the Feature Film category at the 2008 Tokyo Anime Award.
