= Crayon Shin-chan: Fierceness That Invites Storm! Yakiniku Road of Honor =

Crayon Shin-chan: Fierceness That Invites Storm! Yakiniku Road of Glory
- Theatrical release poster

Japanese name
- Kanji: クレヨンしんちゃん 嵐を呼ぶ 栄光のヤキニクロード
Transcriptions
- Revised Hepburn: Kureyon Shin-chan: Arashi o Yobu: Eikō no Yakiniku Rōdo
- Directed by: Tsutomu Mizushima
- Written by: Tsutomu Mizushima
- Starring: Akiko Yajima; Miki Narahashi; Keiji Fujiwara; Satomi Kōrogi; Junko Minagawa; Masashi Ebara
- Production company: Shin-Ei Animation
- Distributed by: Toho
- Release date: 19 April 2003
- Running time: 88 minutes
- Country: Japan
- Language: Japanese

Crayon Shin-chan: Fierceness That Invites Storm! Yakiniku Road of Glory (クレヨンしんちゃん 嵐を呼ぶ 栄光のヤキニクロード, Kureyon Shin-chan: Arashi o Yobu: Eikō no Yakiniku Rōdo), also known as The Glorious Road to Grilled Beef, is a 2003 anime film. It is the 11th film based on the popular comedy manga and anime series Crayon Shin-chan. The first film in the series to use digital ink and paint. The film was released to theatres on 19 April 2003 in Japan. The film was produced by Shin-Ei Animation, the studio behind the anime television.

== Plot ==
Misae reveals that she was planning a massive tasty dinner for that night, and to save money for it, she was cutting costs on breakfast. That elates all of them.

Just then, a car crashes in their compound wall, breaking the wall and Shiro's bowl. A man comes out and tells that some people are chasing him for something he has and they need to help him. Hiroshi suggests him to go to the cops, but the man refuses. Just then, Shin-Chan tells there is someone else too, which scares the man, and he tells that he has given that thing to the Noharas.

The Noharas refuse to go with them. Just then they chase the Noharas but they family escapes and runs. They spread negative rumours about the Noharas and announce a price to catch them.

When they run a man helps them and they are separated. They come to know that they are called from their head office in Atami.

When they reach Atami, the head tells them that he has made a machine that can control human mind and the voice lock has recorded Noharas voice. They unlock the machine. Chaos occurs then at last Shinchan takes the mind controller machine and resets everything.

At last, the Nohara family go to their town for the tasty dinner.

== Cast ==
- Akiko Yajima as Shinnosuke "Shin-chan" Nohara
- Keiji Fujiwara as Hiroshi Nohara
- Miki Narahashi as Misae Nohara
- Satomi Kōrogi as Himawari Nohara
- Tesshō Genda as Action Kamen
- Junko Minagawa as Amagi
- Tomomi Kahara as herself
- Masashi Ebara as Shimoda
- Hiroya Ishimaru as Man
- Unshō Ishizuka as Boss

== International release ==
This movie aired in India on Hungama TV as Shin Chan Masala Story The Movie on 21 June 2014. It was released as Crayon Shinchan The Movie: Glorious Grilled Yakiniku Road with English subtitles on VCD and DVD by PMP Entertainment.

== See also ==
- List of Crayon Shin-chan films
