= List of works by Masaaki Yuasa =

The following is a list of works by Japanese filmmaker and artist Masaaki Yuasa, divided into the categories of works where he primarily served in an animation or artistic capacity, his filmography of projects where he had directorial or substantive creative control, and his published works in print.

== Works as an animator/artist ==
Work	Year	Format	Role
Doraemon: The Record of Nobita's Parallel Visit to the West	1988	Feature Film	In-between Animator
Oishinbo	1988-92	TV series	Key Animator (episodes 12, 17)
Kiteretsu Daihyakka	1988-96	TV series	Key Animator (episode 19)
Doraemon: Nobita and the Animal Planet	1990	Feature Film	Key Animator
Chibi Maruko-chan: Ono-kun and Sugiyama-kun	1990	Feature Film	Setting Designer, Key Animator
Chibi Maruko-chan (first series)	1990-92	TV series	Storyboard Artist (episode 126), Key Animator (episodes 1, 6, 9, 16, 21, 31–32, 40)
Little Polar Bear: Shirokuma-kun, Fune ni Noru	1991	OVA	Character Designer, Animation Director, Key Animator
21 Emon: To Space! The Barefoot Princess	1992	Feature Film	Key Animator
Ai Monogatari	1992	OVA	Key Animator (segment: "Stop the Time")
Video Girl Ai	1992	OVA Series	Key Animator (episode 2)
Chibi Maruko-chan: My Favorite Song	1992	Feature Film	Key Animator
Crayon Shin-chan	1992–present	TV series	Storyboard Artist (episodes 126, 291), Animation Director (episodes 48, 126, 260, 291)
Crayon Shin-chan: Action Mask vs. Leotard Devil	1993	Feature Film	Setting Designer, Key Animator
Crayon Shin-chan: The Hidden Treasure of the Buri Buri Kingdom	1994	Feature Film	Setting Designer
The Hakkenden: A New Saga - Hamaji’s Resurrection	1994	OVA Episode	Animation Director
Crayon Shin-chan: Unkokusai's Ambition	1995	Feature Film	Setting Designer, Key Animator
Agent Aika	1995-97	OVA Series	Key Animator (episode 5)
Chibi Maruko-chan (second series)	1995–present	TV series	Storyboard Artist and Key Animator (opening credit sequence 1)
Crayon Shin-chan: Great Adventure in Henderland	1996	Feature Film	Storyboard Artist, Setting Designer, Key Animator
Crayon Shin-chan: Pursuit of the Balls of Darkness	1997	Feature Film	Setting Designer, Key Animator
Licca-chan to Yamaneko Hoshi no Tabi	1997	OVA	Key Animator
Noiseman Sound Insect	1997	Short Film	Character Designer, Animation Director
Manmaru The Ninja Penguin	1997-98	TV series	Key Animator (ending credit sequence)
Crayon Shin-chan: Blitzkrieg! Pig's Hoof's Secret Mission	1998	Feature Film	Setting Designer, Key Animator
Crayon Shin-chan: Explosion! The Hot Spring's Feel Good Final Battle	1999	Feature Film	Key Animator
My Neighbors the Yamadas	1999	Feature Film	Key Animator
Crayon Shin-chan: Jungle That Invites Storm	2000	Feature Film	Character Designer, Key Animator
Kasumin	2001-03	TV series	Setting Designer
The Whale Hunt	2002	Short Film	Character Designer, Key Animator
Doraemon: Nobita in the Wan-Nyan Spacetime Odyssey	2004	Feature Film	Key Animator
Crayon Shin-chan: Fierceness That Invites Storm! The Kasukabe Boys of the Evening Sun	2004	Feature Film	Key Animator
Samurai Champloo	2004	TV series	Key Animator (episode 9)
Sweat Punch: A Wake in Garakuta Town	2006	Anthology OVA	Key Animator
Crayon Shin-chan: Fierceness That Invites Storm! The Singing Buttocks Bomb	2007	Feature Film	Key Animator
Crayon Shin-chan: Fierceness That Invites Storm! The Hero of Kinpoko	2008	Feature Film	Setting Designer
Genius Party Beyond: Wanwa the Doggy	2008	Anthology Feature Film	Key Animator
Michiko & Hatchin	2008-09	TV series	Director and Storyboard Artist (ending credit sequence)
Wakfu: Noximilien the Watchmaker	2010	TV Episode	Character Designer
The Mystic Archives of Dantalian	2011	TV series	Key Animator (episode 11)
Lupin the Third: The Woman Called Fujiko Mine	2012	TV series	Key Animator (episode 12)
Photo Kano	2013	TV series	Storyboard Artist (episode 7)
Crayon Shin-chan: Very Tasty! B-class Gourmet Survival!!	2013	Feature Film	Key Animator
Crayon Shin-chan: Intense Battle! Robo Dad Strikes Back	2014	Feature Film	Storyboard Artist, Setting Designer, and Key Animator ("Giant Hiroshi Robot Battle" sequence)
Crayon Shin-chan: My Moving Story! Cactus Large Attack!	2015	Feature Film	Storyboard Artist, Animation Assistance
Everyday Is The Song	2023	Album Art	Artist
Spy x Family	2023	TV series	Director and Storyboard Artist (opening credit sequence)

== Filmography ==
=== Television ===
Year	Title	Director	Writer	Producer	Other Roles	Notes
1992	Anime Rakugo Kan	Yes (episode 3)	Yes (episode 3)		Character Designer and Key Animator (episode 3)	OVA series
1999	Vampiyan Kids	Yes			Storyboard Artist	TV pilot
2006	Kemonozume	Yes	Yes (series composition; episodes 1–2, 6, 8–9, 13)		Storyboard Artist (episodes 1–2, 13), Key Animator (episode 2)	
2008	Kaiba	Yes	Yes (episodes 1–12)		Storyboard Artist (episodes 1, 10–12)	
2010	The Tatami Galaxy	Yes	Yes (episodes 1–11)		Storyboard Artist (episodes 1, 11; opening credit sequence)	
2010-12	Shin-men	Yes			Storyboard Artist (episodes 1–5), Animation Director (episodes 1, 4–5)	
2014	Adventure Time	Yes	Yes	Yes	Storyboard Artist, Key Animator	Episode: "Food Chain"
2014	Space Dandy	Yes (episode 16)	Yes (episode 16)		Storyboard Artist, Alien Designer, Setting Designer, and Key Animator (episode 16)	Episode: "Slow and Steady Wins the Race, Baby"
2014	Ping Pong The Animation	Yes	Yes (series composition; episodes 1–11)		Storyboard Artist (episodes 1–11)	
2018	Devilman Crybaby	Yes			Storyboard Artist (episodes 1–2, 9–10)	
2019-20	Super Shiro	Yes	Yes (episode 1)			
2020	Keep Your Hands Off Eizouken!	Yes	Yes (series composition)		Storyboard Artist (opening credit sequence)	
2020	Japan Sinks: 2020	Yes			Storyboard Artist (episodes 2–5)	

=== Film ===
Year	Title	Director	Writer	Producer	Other Roles	Notes
1999	Slime Adventures: Yay, the Sea!	Yes				Short film
2001	Cat Soup		Yes	Animation Producer	Storyboard Artist	Short film
2004	Mind Game	Yes	Yes			
2007	Genius Party	Yes	Yes		Storyboard Artist, Character Designer, Animation Director	Segment "Happy Machine"
2010	Welcome to the Space Show	Yes (sequence)			Storyboard Artist and Key Animator (sequence)	
2013	Kick-Heart	Yes	Yes			Short film
2017	The Night Is Short, Walk On Girl	Yes			Storyboard Artist	
2017	Lu Over the Wall	Yes	Yes	Executive producer		
2019	Ride Your Wave	Yes				
2020	Japan Sinks: 2020 Theatrical Edition	Yes				Compilation film
2021	Inu-Oh	Yes				

== Published works ==
Work	Year	Summary	Notes
Sketchbook for Animation Projects	2016	Compilation of watercolor illustrations from projects including Crayon Shin-chan, Noiseman Sound Insect, Mind Game, and Kick-Heart. The book also includes a short manga entitled Rocket Boy.	
The Mysterious World No One Knows About - Masaaki Yuasa Sketchworks	2018	Compilation of watercolor illustrations from projects including Kemonozume, Kick-Heart, Lu Over the Wall, The Night is Short, Walk on Girl, and Devilman crybaby. Also includes two transcribed conversations between Yuasa and Japanese animation directors Katsuhiro Otomo and Mamoru Oshii, respectively.	
