= List of Crayon Shin-chan films =

This list of Crayon Shin-chan films features feature-length films based on the manga and anime series Crayon Shin-chan. Since 1993, all of these films to date have been released by Toho. Toho currently holds worldwide distribution and licensing rights for all of the films in the series. As of 2026, there are 35 feature films.

Crayon Shin-chan the Movie: Spooky! My Yokai Vacation is highest-grossing film of the series.

A live-action film titled Ballad: Song of a Nameless Love, based on Crayon Shin-chan's animated film Crayon Shin-chan: Fierceness That Invites Storm! The Battle of the Warring States, was released in 2009, with the live action film's Kawakami family being the equivalent of the anime's Nohara family.

== Feature films ==
Overall / Official order	Title	Theatrical release date
1	Crayon Shin-chan: Action Mask vs. Leotard Devil (クレヨンしんちゃん アクション仮面VSハイグレ魔王, Kureyon Shinchan: Akushon Kamen tai Haigure Maō)	24 July 1993
2	Crayon Shin-chan: The Hidden Treasure of the Buri Buri Kingdom (クレヨンしんちゃん ブリブリ王国の秘宝, Kureyon Shinchan: Buriburi Ōkoku no Hihō)	23 April 1994
3	Crayon Shin-chan: Unkokusai's Ambition (クレヨンしんちゃん 雲黒斎の野望, Kureyon Shinchan: Unkokusai no Yabō)	15 April 1995
4	Crayon Shin-chan: Great Adventure in Henderland (クレヨンしんちゃん ヘンダーランドの大冒険, Kureyon Shinchan: Hendārando no Daibōken)	13 April 1996
5	Crayon Shin-chan: Pursuit of the Balls of Darkness (クレヨンしんちゃん 暗黒タマタマ大追跡, Kureyon Shinchan: Ankoku Tamatama Daitsuiseki)	19 April 1997
6	Crayon Shin-chan: Blitzkrieg! Pig's Hoof's Secret Mission (クレヨンしんちゃん 電撃！ブタのヒヅメ大作戦, Kureyon Shinchan: Dengeki! Buta no Hizume Daisakusen)	18 April 1998
7	Crayon Shin-chan: Explosion! The Hot Spring's Feel Good Final Battle (クレヨンしんちゃん 爆発!温泉わくわく大決戦/クレしんパラダイス！メイド・イン・埼玉, Kureyon Shinchan: Bakuhatsu! Onsen Wakuwaku Daikessen) (Note: includes an 11 minute short)	17 April 1999
8	Crayon Shin-chan: Jungle That Invites Storm (クレヨンしんちゃん 嵐を呼ぶジャングル, Kureyon Shinchan: Arashi o Yobu Janguru)	22 April 2000
9	Crayon Shin-chan: Fierceness That Invites Storm! The Adult Empire Strikes Back (クレヨンしんちゃん 嵐を呼ぶ モーレツ！オトナ帝国の逆襲, Kureyon Shinchan: Arashi o Yobu: Mōretsu! Otona Teikoku no Gyakushū)	21 April 2001
10	Crayon Shin-chan: Fierceness That Invites Storm! The Battle of the Warring States (クレヨンしんちゃん 嵐を呼ぶ アッパレ！戦国大合戦, Kureyon Shinchan: Arashi o Yobu: Appare! Sengoku Daikassen)	20 April 2002
11	Crayon Shin-chan: Fierceness That Invites Storm! Yakiniku Road of Honor (クレヨンしんちゃん 嵐を呼ぶ 栄光のヤキニクロード, Kureyon Shinchan: Arashi o Yobu: Eikō no Yakuniku Rōdo)	19 April 2003
12	Crayon Shin-chan: Fierceness That Invites Storm! The Kasukabe Boys of the Evening Sun (クレヨンしんちゃん 嵐を呼ぶ！夕陽のカスカベボーイズ, Kureyon Shinchan: Arashi o Yobu! Yūhi no Kasukabe Bōizu)	17 April 2004
13	Crayon Shin-chan: The Legend Called Buri Buri 3 Minutes Charge (クレヨンしんちゃん 伝説を呼ぶブリブリ 3分ポッキリ大進撃, Kureyon Shinchan: Densetsu o Yobu Buriburi: Sanpun Bokkiri Daishingeki)	16 April 2005
14	Crayon Shin-chan: The Legend Called: Dance! Amigo! (クレヨンしんちゃん 伝説を呼ぶ 踊れ！アミーゴ！, Kureyon Shinchan: Densetsu wo Yobu: Odore! Amīgo!)	15 April 2006
15	Crayon Shin-chan: Fierceness That Invites Storm! The Singing Buttocks Bomb (クレヨンしんちゃん 嵐を呼ぶ 歌うケツだけ爆弾!, Kureyon Shinchan: Arashi o Yobu: Utau Ketsudake Bakudan!)	21 April 2007
16	Crayon Shin-chan: Fierceness That Invites Storm! The Hero of Kinpoko (クレヨンしんちゃん ちょー嵐を呼ぶ 金矛の勇者, Kureyon Shinchan: Arashi o Yobu: Kinpoko no Yūsha)	19 April 2008
17	Crayon Shin-chan: Roar! Kasukabe Animal Kingdom (クレヨンしんちゃん オタケベ！カスカベ野生王国, Kureyon Shinchan: Otakebe! Kasukabe Yasei Ōkoku)	18 April 2009
10b	BALLAD: Song of a Nameless Love [ja] (BALLAD 名もなき恋のうた, BALLAD Namonaki Koi no Uta)	5 September 2009
18	Crayon Shin-chan: Super-Dimension! The Storm Called My Bride (クレヨンしんちゃん 超時空！嵐を呼ぶオラの花嫁, Kureyon Shinchan: Chōjikū! Arashi o Yobu Ora no Hanayome)	17 April 2010
19	Crayon Shin-chan: Fierceness That Invites Storm! Operation Golden Spy (クレヨンしんちゃん 嵐を呼ぶ黄金のスパイ大作戦, Kureyon Shinchan: Arashi o Yobu! Ōgon no Supai Daisakusen)	16 April 2011
20	Crayon Shin-chan: Fierceness That Invites Storm! Me and the Space Princess (クレヨンしんちゃん 嵐を呼ぶ!オラと宇宙のプリンセス, Kureyon Shinchan: Arashi o Yobu! Ora to Uchū no Princess)	14 April 2012
21	Crayon Shin-chan: Very Tasty! B-class Gourmet Survival!! (クレヨンしんちゃん バカうまっ！ B級グルメサバイバル！！, Kureyon Shinchan: Bakauma! B-kyuu gurume sabaibaru!!)	20 April 2013
22	Crayon Shin-chan: Intense Battle! Robo Dad Strikes Back (クレヨンしんちゃん ガチンコ!逆襲のロボ とーちゃん, Kureyon Shinchan: Gachinko! Gyakushu no ROBO to-chan)	19 April 2014
23	Crayon Shin-chan: My Moving Story! Cactus Large Attack! (クレヨンしんちゃん オラの引越し物語 サボテン大襲撃, Kureyon Shinchan: Ora no Hikkoshi Monogatari Saboten Dai Shūgeki!)	18 April 2015
24	Crayon Shin-chan: Fast Asleep! The Great Assault on Dreamy World! (クレヨンしんちゃん 爆睡 ！ ユメミーワールド大突撃！, Kureyon Shinchan: Bakusui! Yumemi-Wārudo Daitotsugeki!)	16 April 2016
25	Crayon Shin-chan: Invasion!! Alien Shiriri (クレヨンしんちゃん 襲来！！宇宙人シリリ, Kureyon Shinchan: Shūrai!! Uchūjin Shiriri)	15 April 2017
26	Crayon Shin-chan: Burst Serving! Kung Fu Boys ~Ramen Rebellion~ (クレヨンしんちゃん 爆盛！カンフーボーイズ ～拉麺大乱～, Kureyon Shinchan: Bakumori! Kanfū Bōizu ~Rāmen Tairan~)	13 April 2018
27	Crayon Shin-chan: Honeymoon Hurricane ~The Lost Hiroshi~ (クレヨンしんちゃん 新婚旅行ハリケーン ～失われたひろし～, Kureyon Shinchan: Shinkon Ryokō Harikēn ~Ushinawareta Hiroshi~)	19 April 2019
28	Crayon Shin-chan: Crash! Graffiti Kingdom and Almost Four Heroes (クレヨンしんちゃん 激突！ ラクガキングダムとほぼ四人の勇者, Kureyon Shinchan: Gekitotsu! Rakugakingudamu to hobo yonin no yūsha)	11 September 2020
29	Crayon Shin-chan: Shrouded in Mystery! The Flowers of Tenkazu Academy (クレヨンしんちゃん 謎メキ！花の天カス学園, Kureyon Shinchan: Nazo Meki! Hana no Tenkasu Gakuen)	30 July 2021
30	Crayon Shin-chan: The Tornado Legend of Ninja Mononoke (クレヨンしんちゃん もののけニンジャ珍風伝, Kureyon Shin-chan: Mononoke Ninja Chinpūden)	22 April 2022
31; Extra 1	New Dimension! Crayon Shin-chan the Movie: Battle of Supernatural Powers ~Flying Sushi~ (しん次元! クレヨンしんちゃんTHE MOVIE 超能力大決戦 ~とべとべ手巻き寿司~, Shin Jigen! Kureyon Shin-chan za Mūbī Chounouryoku Daikessen Tobe Tobe Temakizushi) (in 3DCG)	4 August 2023
32; 31	Crayon Shin-chan the Movie: Our Dinosaur Diary (クレヨンしんちゃん オラたちの恐竜日記, Eiga Kureyon Shin-chan Ora-tachi no Kyōryū Nikki)	9 August 2024
33; 32	Crayon Shin-chan the Movie: Super Hot! The Spicy Kasukabe Dancers (クレヨンしんちゃん 超華麗！灼熱のカスカベダンサーズ, Eiga Kureyon Shin-chan Chō Karē! Shakunetsu no Kasukabe Dansāzu)	8 August 2025
34; 33	Crayon Shin-chan the Movie: Spooky! My Yokai Vacation (映画クレヨンしんちゃん奇々怪々! オラの妖怪バケーション, Eiga Crayon Shin-chan Kikikaikai! Ora no Yōkai Bake-shon)	31 July 2026
