= Crayon Shin-chan: Invasion!! Alien Shiriri =

2017 anime film directed by Masakazu Hashimoto

- Poster 2017
- Directed by: Masakazu Hashimoto
- Based on: Crayon Shin-chan by Yoshito Usui
- Starring: Akiko Yajima; Miki Narahashi; Toshiyuki Morikawa; Satomi Korogi; Miyuki Sawashiro; Tōru Hotohara; Hiroyuki Miyasako
- Music by: Toshiyuki Arakawa; Kow Otani
- Production companies: Shin-Ei Animation; TV Asahi; ADK; Futabasha
- Distributed by: Toho
- Release date: 15 April 2017
- Running time: 103 minutes
- Country: Japan
- Language: Japanese
- Box office: $13.1 million

Crayon Shin-chan: Invasion!! Alien Shiriri (クレヨンしんちゃん: 襲来！！宇宙人シリリ, Kureyon Shinchan: Shūrai! Uchūjin Shiriri) is a 2017 Japanese anime film produced by Shin-Ei Animation. It is the 25th film of the popular comedy manga and anime series Crayon Shin-chan. It was released on 15 April 2017 in Japanese theatres. It is directed by Masakazu Hashimoto, who also directed the 21st movie Crayon Shin-chan: Very Tasty! B-class Gourmet Survival!! and 23rd movie Crayon Shin-chan: My Moving Story! Cactus Large Attack!.

With this movie, Crayon Shin-chan celebrates the silver jubilee of its movie series.

Neofilms later opened the film in Hong Kong in summer 2017.

== Synopsis ==
One day, the Nohara family met a mysterious alien from outer space named Shiriri. On being struck by a ray emitted by Shiriri, Hiroshi and Misae became 25 years younger and appeared as kids. To be able to return to adult form, they must find Shiriri's father, who is somewhere in Japan. This situation, which initially started with Shinnosuke's family and later his friends, gradually involves the whole of Japan.

== Cast ==
- Akiko Yajima as Shinnosuke Nohara
- Miki Narahashi as Misae Nohara
- Toshiyuki Morikawa as Hiroshi Nohara (Note: The original voice actor Keiji Fujiwara is on rest.)
- Satomi Korogi as Himawari Nohara
- Mari Mashiba as Toru Kazama and Shiro
- Tamao Hayashi as Nene Sakurada
- Teiyū Ichiryūsai as Masao Satou
- Chie Sato as Bo-chan

=== Guest cast ===
- Miyuki Sawashiro as Shiriri
- Hiroyuki Miyasako (from Ameagari Kesshitai) as Shiriri's father
- Tōru Hotohara as Morudada
- Mirai Shida as herself

== Music ==
=== Opening theme song ===
- Kimi ni 100 Percent (Warner Music Japan / unBORDE)
  - Singer: Kyary Pamyu Pamyu

=== Ending theme song ===
- Road-Movie (ロードムービー, rōdomūbī)
  - Singer: Yuu Takahashi

== Reception ==
The movie grossed an all total of ¥1.62 billion in Japan and $13,101,686 worldwide.

== Home video release ==
The DVD and Blu-ray of this movie was released by Bandai Visual in Japan on November 10, 2017.

== See also ==
- Yoshito Usui
