= Crayon Shin-chan: The Tornado Legend of Ninja Mononoke =

2022 Japanese animated film

- Theatrical release poster

Japanese name
- Kanji: クレヨンしんちゃん もののけニンジャ珍風伝
Transcriptions
- Revised Hepburn: Kureyon Shinchan: Mononoke Ninja Chinpūden
- Directed by: Masakazu Hashimoto
- Screenplay by: Masakazu Hashimoto; Kimiko Ueno
- Based on: Crayon Shin-chan by Yoshito Usui
- Starring: Yumiko Kobayashi; Miki Narahashi; Toshiyuki Morikawa; Satomi Kōrogi; Mari Mashiba
- Music by: Toshiyuki Arakawa; Shinji Miyazaki
- Production company: Shin-Ei Animation
- Distributed by: Toho
- Release date: April 22, 2022
- Running time: 100 minutes
- Country: Japan
- Language: Japanese
- Box office: $14.9 million

Crayon Shin-chan: The Tornado Legend of Ninja Mononoke (クレヨンしんちゃん もののけニンジャ珍風伝, Kureyon Shin-chan: Mononoke Ninja Chinpūden) is a 2022 Japanese animated film produced by Shin-Ei Animation. It is the 30th film of the anime series Crayon Shin-chan. The film is directed by Masakazu Hashimoto and the screenplay is written by both Masakazu Hashimoto and Kimiko Ueno. The film was released on 22 April 2022.

== Premise ==
One day, a woman named Chiyome Hesogakure with a child named Chinzō visits the Nohara family and claims that she is the real mother of Shinnosuke and she claims Shinnosuke & replaces him with her son Chinzo & takes him to a Ninja Village. Here the Hesogakure family has been protecting "the earth's navel" by blocking it with a pure gold stopper using the "Mononoke Ninja technique" that has been passed down from generation to generation. If it comes off, the earth will wither, the rotation will stop, and the "tomorrow" of the world will be lost! But prolonged use of the technique causes its wielders to be permanently transformed into anthropomorphised animals. This caused Chinzo's grandfather to become a sloth & his father to become a gorilla. Chiyome, who was pregnant with her second child, fears that her children too will be coerced into overusing the Ninja technique by the headman of the Ninjas & transform into animals like their father, now that the gold stopper was gradually coming out. So she replaced Chinzo with Shinnosuke, as both were born on the same day at the same hospital, with Chiyoma & Shinnosuke's mother Misae being in the same ward. On hearing the real events from Chinzo, Shin-chan's parents travel to the Ninja Village, but the greedy Ninja headman (who wanted to profit from the gold) put obstacles on their path. Finally when the gold stopper comes out, Shin chan & his friends master the Mononoke Ninja technique & put back the gold stopper in its place & Chiyome delivers her second child.

== Cast ==
- Yumiko Kobayashi as Shinnosuke Nohara
- Miki Narahashi as Misae Nohara
- Toshiyuki Morikawa as Hiroshi Nohara
- Satomi Kōrogi as Himawari Nohara
- Mari Mashiba as Shiro and Toru Kazama
- Tamao Hayashi as Nene Sakurada
- Teiyū Ichiryūsai as Masao Sato
- Chie Satō as Bo Suzuki
- Rina Kawaei as Chiyome Hesogakure
- Ayahi Takagaki as Chinzō Hesogakure
- Natsuki Hanae as Gomaemon Hesogakure
- Jin Urayama as an elder of the ninja village
- Aoi Yūki as the elder's secretary
- Sora Amamiya as Fūko
- Yū Sawabe (Haraichi) as himself
- Yūki Iwai (Haraichi) as himself
- Tesshō Genda as Action Kamen

== Soundtrack ==
- Theme song: "Hi wa Mata Noboru Kara" (陽はまた昇るから; lit. 'Because the Sun Will Rise Again') by Ryokuoushoku Shakai

== Release ==
The film got theatrical release in Japan on 22 April 2022. It was released on 8 September 2022 in theatres in Singapore by Muse Asia. It aired in India on 9 June 2024 on Sony YAY! as Shin-chan The Legends of Ninja Mononoke. In Hindi, Tamil, Telugu, Kannada, Malayalam and Bengali.

== Box office ==
Crayon Shin-chan: The Tornado Legend of Ninja Mononoke debuted at no. 2 in its first weekend, with a sell of about 280,000 tickets in its first three days. According to Box Office Mojo, it grossed $14,895,696 at the box office.

Here is a table which shows the box office of this movie of all the weekends in Japan as of June 19. 2022:

Weekend no.	Rank	Weekend gross	Total gross till current weekend	Ref.
1	2	¥312 million (US$2.44 million)	¥350 million (US$2.74 million)	
2	2	¥284,281,300 (US$2.18 million)	¥872,403,450 (US$6.71 million)	
3	3	¥142,784,200 (US$1.09 million)	¥1,472,886,450 (US$11.32 million)	
4	4	¥114,347,550 (US$885,600 (equivalent to $974,321 in 2025))	¥1,618,119,550 (US$12.53 million)	
5	5	¥81,821,500 (US$640,200 (equivalent to $704,336 in 2025))	¥1,723,867,750 (US$13.48 million)	
6	5	¥61,529,450 (US$480,000 (equivalent to $528,087 in 2025))	¥1,812,109,950 (US$14.13 million)	
7	7	¥44,489,350 (US$335,800 (equivalent to $369,441 in 2025))	¥1,886,597,350 (US$14.24 million)	
8	9	¥36,756,500 (US$273,500 (equivalent to $300,900 in 2025))	¥1,937,601,300 (US$14.42 million)	
9	10+	¥26,671,900 (US$197,400 (equivalent to $217,176 in 2025))	¥1,972,639,050 (US$14.6 million)	

== See also ==
- List of Crayon Shin-chan films
