= Crayon Shin-chan: Great Adventure in Henderland =

- Theatrical release poster

Japanese name
- Kanji: クレヨンしんちゃん ヘンダーランドの大冒険
Transcriptions
- Revised Hepburn: Kureyon Shin-chan: Hendārando no Dai Bōken
- Directed by: Mitsuru Hongo
- Screenplay by: Mitsuru Hongo; Keiichi Hara
- Based on: Crayon Shin-chan by Yoshito Usui
- Produced by: Hitoshi Sigeki; Kenji Ōta; Takashi Horiuchi
- Starring: Akiko Yajima; Miki Narahashi; Keiji Fujiwara; Yuriko Fuchizaki; Toshio Furukawa; Hideyuki Tanaka; Hōchū Ōtsuka
- Cinematography: Hideko Takahashi
- Edited by: Hajime Okayasu
- Music by: Toshiyuki Arakawa; Shinji Miyazaki
- Production companies: Shin-Ei Animation; TV Asahi; ADK
- Distributed by: Toho
- Release date: April 13, 1996
- Running time: 97 minutes
- Country: Japan
- Language: Japanese
- Box office: ¥1.2 billion ($9.4 million)

Crayon Shin-chan: Great Adventure in Henderland (クレヨンしんちゃん ヘンダーランドの大冒険, Kureyon Shin-chan: Hendārando no Dai Bōken) is a 1996 Japanese anime film produced by Shin-Ei Animation. It is the 4th film of the anime series Crayon Shin-chan.

== Plot ==
A prince named Gorman fought with a dragon to save Henderland's princess Mimori, but got captured by the evil magic of a pair of fraternal twin dolls, Joma and Makao. This is a story that Ms. Yoshinaga narrates to her students. The school then organizes a field trip to Henderland (a parodied version of Disneyland), a theme park based on the same fairy tale. In Henderland, Shinnosuke get separated from his friends and teachers and meets Toppema Mappet, a dancing doll in the restricted section of the park. Shinnosuke winds the doll's key, causing her to move and talk like a human. Shinnosuke then covers a larger doll of Princess Mimori in a glass case, whom the smaller doll called Toppema claims to be a real princess trapped by evil forces.

They confront with 2 other magical dolls, a werewolf called Cre.G.Mad and a femme-fatale called Chokirin who try to silence Toppema. Chokirin and Toppema end up with a magical duel resulting in Toppema's seeming defeat. Shinnosuke then gets called away by his teacher as he returns home.

That night, Toppema meets Shinnosuke and explains that the tale of Henderland is in fact real & the Henderland park is a real land filled with magical creatures as described in the fairy tale where Joma and Makao lead a force of creatures that can control dark magic but are vulnerable to the magic of a suit of magical cards, which she managed to steal from them & seeks the help of Shinnosuke in defeating them because the card's full magic can be unleashed only when wielded by a living being. Despite being shown the power of the cards, Shinnosuke refuses to help Topemma. She leaves the cards with him.

Joma and Makao sends one of their henchman named Snowman to retrieve the magical cards from Shinnosuke. Snowman arrives at Kasukabe and pretends to be an official from the Department Of Education by showing leprechaun gold-like forged documents. Snowman gains the trust of the teachers, Shinnosuke's friends & parents. Shinnosuke tries to warn those around him to beware Snowman but nobody believes him. Snowman spends the night at Shinnosuke's house and tries to steal the cards but fails to do so. Snowman escape leaving a letter containing tickets to Henderland.

Despite Shinnosuke's pleads, his parents visits Henderland. Before leaving, Shinnosuke's parents visit the bathroom but behave very strangely afterwards. Once they return, his parents demand the Magical Cards before falling into the bathtub as they are revealed to be enchanted puppets. Toppema returns and theorizes that Joma and Makao must have captured the real Misae and Hiroshi in Henderland. Determined to save his parents, Shinnosuke agrees to help Toppema. Toppema explains that due to the effect of Chokirin's magic, she can help him only at night, so he spends the entire next day in preparation.

Shinnosuke arrives at Henderland in the evening and is ambushed by Cre.G.Mad, he uses the cards to call Action Kamen, Kantam Robot and Buriburizaemon and transforms into a steam train as Cre.G.Mad transforms into a wolf again. Buriburizaemon comes up with a plan, to create an additional track for Cre.G.Mad to crash into an obstacle. Unfortunately, the plan fails as there was no one to change the way, but at the last minute Toppema appears and changes the wolf's track, causing him to into the water. Cre.G.Mad's t-shirt transforms into Hiroshi, who reveals he was being mind controlled by Joma. The trio head towards Joma and Makao's base but get ambushed by Chokirin.

Toppema and Chokirin once again engage into a magical fight as she defeats Chokirin, but gets weaker and weaker due to exhausting her power and gradually fades and Chokirin's bra transforms into Misae. The three then travel to Joma and Makao's palace where they are challenged to a dance fight. Joma and Makao perform a dazing ballet while the Nohara family perform a traditional Japanese dance and win. They are then challenged to a regular card game which they also win.

In midst of a confrontation, Shinnosuke learns from the magical cards how to defeat Joma and Makao. After much challenge, Joma and Makao are destroyed but their castle begins to crumble. The Nohara family manages to escape the crumbling palace and end up at a beach. Snowman comes there to confront them. Just then Princess Mimori comes and melts down the Snowman, revealing Prince Gorman inside. She reveals herself to be Toppema and explains that Joma and Makao trapped her and Gorman's souls into the doll and a snowman respectively. A huge celebration commemorating Mimori & Gorman's marriage is held as peace and prosperity in Henderland is restored.

== Cast ==
- Akiko Yajima as Shinnosuke Nohara
- Miki Narahashi as Misae Nohara
- Keiji Fujiwara as Hiroshi Nohara
- Mari Mashiba as Toru Kazama
- Teiyū Ichiryūsai as Masao Sato
- Tamao Hayashi as Nene Sakurada
- Chie Satō as Bo Suzuki
- Yuriko Fuchizaki as Toppema Mappet (Doll)
- Toshio Furukawa as Snowman
- Hideyuki Tanaka as Joma
- Hōchū Ōtsuka as Makao
- Shinpachi Tsuji as Cre G. Mad
- Sanae Miyuki as Chokirin Basta
- Yumi Takada as Midori Yoshinaga
- Michie Tomizawa as Ume Matsuzaka
- Rokurō Naya as Bunta Takakura (principal)
- Sōichirō Hoshi as Prince Gorman
- Kaneto Shiozawa as Buriburizaemon
- Shinya Ōtaki as Kantam Robo
- Tesshō Genda as Action Mask
- Akiko Hinagata as herself

== Soundtrack ==
The theme song of the film is SIX COLORS BOY sung by Akiko Hinagata, a Japanese model and singer.

== Staff ==
The names of the staff are listed below:

- Original: Yoshito Usui
- Director: Mitsuru Hongo
- Screenplay: Mitsuru Hongo and Keiichi Hara
- Storyboard: Mitsuru Hongo, Keiichi Hara and Masaaki Yuasa
- Animation director: Katsunori Hara and Noriyuki Tsutsumi
- Cinematography: Hideko Takahashi
- Music: Toshiyuki Arakawa and Shinji Miyazaki
- Sound adjustment: Nobuhiro Shibata, Hisashi Yamamoto, Akiyoshi Tanaka, Nobutaka Taguchi and Takaaki Uchiyama
- Editor: Hajime Okayasu
- Producer: Hitoshi Mogi, Kenji Ōta and Takashi Horiuchi
- Production companies: Shin-Ei Animation, TV Asahi and ADK

== Release ==
It was released in Japan on April 13, 1996. The movie was aired in India on Hungama TV on as Shinchan the Movie: Adventures in Henderland.

== See also ==
- List of Crayon Shin-chan films
