= Crayon Shin-chan: Unkokusai's Ambition =

- Theatrical release poster

Japanese name
- Kanji: クレヨンしんちゃん 雲黒斎の野望
Transcriptions
- Revised Hepburn: Kureyon Shinchan: Unkokusai no Yabō
- Directed by: Mitsuru Hongo
- Written by: Yoshito Usui
- Screenplay by: Keiichi Hara
- Based on: Crayon Shin-chan by Yoshito Usui
- Produced by: Hitoshi Mogi; Takashi Horiuchi; Kenji Ōta
- Starring: Akiko Yajima; Miki Narahashi; Keiji Fujiwara; Rei Sakuma; Megumi Urawa; Yūko Mizutani; Seizō Katō; Kei Tomiyama
- Cinematography: Hideko Takahashi
- Edited by: Hajime Okayasu
- Music by: Toshiyuki Arakawa
- Production companies: Shin-Ei Animation; TV Asahi; ADK
- Distributed by: Toho
- Release date: April 15, 1995
- Running time: 96 minutes
- Country: Japan
- Language: Japanese
- Box office: ¥1.42 billion ($11.1 million)

Crayon Shin-chan: Unkokusai's Ambition (クレヨンしんちゃん 雲黒斎の野望, Kureyon Shinchan: Unkokusai no Yabō), also known as Mr. Smelly's Ambition, is a 1995 anime film. It is the 3rd film based on the popular comedy manga and anime series Crayon Shin-chan. The film is produced by Shin-Ei Animation, the studio behind the anime television.

== Plot ==
An officer of 30th century travelling through time using time patrol machine, conducts an emergency landing in deep underground, in the backyard of the Nohara family's house, under Shiro's doghouse.

The officer takes control over Shiro's body and tells the Nohara family about disturbance in the Sengoku period and requests them for help. They agree to the proposal with hesitance. The three of them wear period-adaptable suits, with Shinnosuke wearing a special suit contrasting the "Save3X" feature

After landing on the ruins of a castle, when some masked people attack them, a swordsman Fubukimaru arrives and fends them off. Fubukimaru tells that Unkokusai killed Fubukimaru's father and mother and captured his sister. Fubukimaru recounts the prophecy, that when castle falls into crisis, "three heroes and one dog" will save it, and believes that the Nohara family are them and asks them to help him defeat Unkokusai. They agree to do so, mostly because one of Unkokusai's henchmen stole Misae's handbag containing important things.

The Nohara family start their journey to Unkokusai's palace with Fubukimaru and his horse. On the way, they are attacked by Unkokusai's henchman, Matabi. Shinnosuke uses the "Save3X" feature and help Fubukimaru by turning into a cockroach. Meanwhile, Unkokusai's woman sidekick, Ogin, who turns Hiroshi and Misae into balls.

That night, they stopped at hot spring. When Fubukimaru went to bathe, Shinnouske and Shiro follow Fubukimaru inside and discover that Fubukimaru is a woman. Fubukimaru tells them that her father had no boys as his heir, so he raised her up as a boy. Suddenly, Unkokusai's henchman, Tamashiro attacks them. Shinnouske turns into a frog by using the "Save3X" feature and helps Fubukimaru to defeat Tamashiro. They soon enter in Unkokusai's castle, where they come across Ogin, who pulls Fubukimaru by her hair. Suddenly, Fubukimaru stabs Ogin with her dagger and Ogin splits out a green smoke on Fubukimaru, which makes her body unable to move. A paralysed Fubukimaru, gives her sword to Shinnouske asking him to defeat Unkokusai.

Soon, Shinnosuke and Shiro enter in a dark room, where they come face-to-face with Unkokusai. Shiro reveals that Unkokusai is the 30th century's history freak, Pierre Jakoman. Shinnouske and Jakoman have a fight, in which Shinnouske uses his "Save3X" feature for the third time and gets transformed into a samurai. During the fight, Shinnouske's sword gets stuck at the roof and he transforms into original self and falls. The edge of the sword hits Jakoman on the head and he falls from castle cliff. Suddenly, a woman named Ring comes towards Shinnouske and introduces herself as an officer from the time patrol in the 30th century. Ring informs Shinnouske that she only borrowed Shiro's body and apologises for putting him and his family in trouble. Fubukimaru arrives and questions Shinnouske about her sister. Suddenly, wind blows from Shinnouske's body through which his parents and Fubukimaru's sister Yukino appears. Fubukimaru reveals that Yukino, is actually a man.

In the next morning, Ring and the Nohara family leave for their century. Fubukimaru and Yukino bid them a farewell. Afterwards, Fubukimaru is woken up by a soft voice, which turns out to be her mother, who asks her to leave for the war (because Jakoman left the century, everything must have become normal).

After returning to their century, The Nohara family are shocked to find themselves and everyone else dressed in weird clothes but all feel those normal. The Nohara family watch the TV and find out that their new president is Jakoman, who has put a reward to the one who catches the Nohara family. Suddenly, Jakoman's henchmen arrive, but Ring fends off by wearing a cat suit and explains the Nohara family that they have to defeat Jakoman in order to return to their normal self.

They go to Jakoman's hideout where he challenges them for fight with his huge robot. Using a helmet which can make its users imagination come true, Shinnouske builds his own robot based on his favourite cartoon named Kuntum Robot to defeat Jakoman. At first they are unable to do so. They succeed when Shinnouske uses a technique of a game playing with his mother and defeats Jakoman for all, after which everything becomes normal.

== Cast and characters ==
- Akiko Yajima as Shinnosuke Nohara
- Miki Narahashi as Misae Nohara
- Keiji Fujiwara as Hiroshi Nohara
- Mari Mashiba as Shiro and Toru Kazama
- Rei Sakuma as Snow Storm Ring
- Megumi Urawa as Fubukimaru Kasuga
- Yūko Mizutani as Yukino
- Tesshō Genda as Action Mask
- Kōji Totani as Matabinekonoshi, Quantam Jr.
- Hōchū Ōtsuka as Bearded Ronin, Villain Robot
- Tamao Hayashi as Nene Sakurada
- Teiyū Ichiryūsai as Masao Sato
- Chie Satō as Bo Suzuki
- Rokurō Naya as Principal (Encho)
- Yumi Takada as Midori Yoshinaga
- Michie Tomizawa as Ume Matsuzaka
- Kappei Yamaguchi as Youth John Yamada
- Seizō Katō as Unkokusai
- Kei Tomiyama as Pierre Jakoman
- Chafurin as Razaya Dan
- Hisako Kyōda as Kasukabe Bookstore Manager
- Sakurako Kishiro as Nakamura
- Junko Hagimori as Ginmei Ogin
- Fubukimaru Kasuga - 15-year-old swordsman Nohara family met in the Warring States period (Sengoku period). She is actually a woman. She is fierce warrior who use both of his hand in fighting. The heir of Kasuga family.
- Snow Storm Ring - An employee from the 30th century time patrol. She was going investigate the crime in the Sengoku period, but time machine got stuck under Shiro's doghouse. So she borrowed her body to talk to the Nohara family and took them to the Sengoku period. After Unkokusai took over the 20th century, she helped the Nohara family defeat him.
- Pierre Jakoman a.k.a. Unkokusai - The 30th century history freak. He described himself as a Trend creator and culturist. He doesn't like violence but uses it in his own way. He took the identity of Unkokusai when invaded the Sengoku period. He was defeated by Shinnouske in that period after which he invaded Shinnouske's period. But he died saying the words "Game over... Time up".
- Matabi Nekono Shi - He has two women around him whenever in Unkokusai's pavilion. He was the one who killed Fubukimaru's mother. He has fierce appearance and has an additional sword in case of emergency. He was killed by Fubukimaru.
- Ginmei a.k.a. Ogin - A pretty lady with evil looks. She was actually a doll which Unkokusai made into a human. She can easily get angry and despite being a woman herself she hates women, especially those who mess with Unkokusai. She turned Misae and Hiroshi into balls after the former angered her. She was destroyed by Fubukimaru.
- Tamashiro - A beetle shaped warrior who looks funny but is very fierce just like Matabi. He was killed by cannon which was boasted by Shinnouske, Shiro and Enji.
- Yukino - Fubukimaru's younger sister. She looks very pretty and wears an elegant kimono. But Fubukimaru revealed that Yukino was actually a man.

== Staff ==
The names of the staff are listed below:

- Original: Yoshito Usui
- Director: Mitsuru Hongo
- Screenplay: Keiichi Hara
- Animation director: Katsunori Hara and Noriyuki Tsutsumi
- Cinematography: Hideko Takahashi
- Editor: Hajime Okayasu
- Music: Toshiyuki Arakawa
- Producer: Hitoshi Mogi, Takashi Horiuchi and Kenji Ōta
- Production companies: Shin-Ei Animation, TV Asahi and ADK

== Release ==
The film was released in theatres on April 15, 1995, in Japan. It was released as Crayon Shin-chan The Movie: The Ambition Of Dark Cloud Religion with English subtitles on VCD by PMP Entertainment. It was released in India on 26 October 2024 on Sony YAY! as Shinchan: Mr. Smelly's Ambition.

== See also ==
- List of Crayon Shin-chan films
