= Crayon Shin-chan: Shrouded in Mystery! The Flowers of Tenkasu Academy =

2021 Japanese animated film

- Theatrical release poster

Japanese name
- Kanji: クレヨンしんちゃん 謎メキ！花の天カス学園
Transcriptions
- Revised Hepburn: Kureyon Shinchan: Nazo Meki! Hana no Tenkasu Gakuen
- Directed by: Wataru Takahashi
- Screenplay by: Kimiko Ueno
- Based on: Crayon Shin-chan by Yoshito Usui
- Starring: Yumiko Kobayashi; Mari Mashiba; Tamao Hayashi; Teiyū Ichiryūsai; Chie Satō; Ryō Hirohashi
- Music by: Toshiyuki Arakawa; Kow Otani
- Production company: Shin-Ei Animation
- Distributed by: Toho
- Release date: July 30, 2021 (Japan)
- Running time: 104 minutes
- Country: Japan
- Language: Japanese
- Box office: ¥1.71 billion

Crayon Shin-chan: Shrouded in Mystery! The Flowers of Tenkasu Academy (クレヨンしんちゃん 謎メキ！花の天カス学園, Kureyon Shin-chan: Nazo Meki! Hana no Tenkasu Gakuen) is a 2021 Japanese anime film produced by Shin-Ei Animation. It is the 29th film of the anime series Crayon Shin-chan. The director of the film is Wataru Takahashi and screenplay is written by Kimiko Ueno. The film deals with the stressful & competitive environment of Japan's higher education sector.

== Synopsis ==
The film's story begins with Shinnosuke and his friends of "Kasukabe Defence Force" experiencing a one-week stay in "Tenkatōitsu Kasukabe Private Academy" (nicknamed "Tenkasu"), an elite boarding school that is administrated by a state-of-the-art AI, "Otsumun". All the students are given a badge initially with 1000 points and their points are increased/decreased by Otsumun based on their behaviors and academic performance. All the students are subjected to mental stress in order to foster an unending competition among their peers to obtain the highest score & becoming 'elite'. Those who hold the higher points receive preferential treatment from the AI, while those with lesser points faced severe stress from the Otsumun & bullying from their peers. But recently, the school campus is plagued by the attacks of a vampire, who bites the students with high points on their buttocks, causing them to become infantile.

In the campus, Masao is unable to cope up with the stress & bullying in the campus, so he becomes a rebel & joins a group of delinquent students. Bo befriends a girl named Yororo, who exhibits anti-social & misanthropic traits to hide her enthusiasm for wildlife (which wasn't appreciated in the campus). Kazama, who always harboured ambitions of becoming elite, is attacked by the vampire, leaving him intellectually retarded. His friends with the aid of a female student Chisio Atsuki, a former athlete who used to excel in marathon running, but gave it up after receiving injury to her feet due to the bullying she endured for the deformities her face would endure during the process, try to solve the mystery. The vampire is revealed to be Sasuga, the highest scoring boy in the academy, who was in secretly love with Chisio but was forbidden to interact with her due to the school' elitist set-up, so he had devised an instrument with the aid of Otsmun (who in turn had been directed by the principal to devise a way to promote as many students to elite rank as possible in order to secure the school's reputation) to artificially manipulate the intelligence of students (hence the bites on the buttocks & intellectual retardation), so that Chisio could be propelled forward in the ranks, but Chisio rejects his help. Otsmun then conducts the experiment on Kazama, brainwashing him in the process, thereby making him 'elite'. The new 'elite' Kazama, under the control of Otsmun, invites people to get brainwashed in order to become 'elite', but Shinchan states that getting yakisoba bread from the food stall in the campus is far difficult than becoming 'elite'. Otsumun-Kazama then challenges Shinchan & his friends to a marathon to obtain the food item, in order to prove that superiority of artificial intelligence over human intelligence. Shinchan & his friends, aided by Chisio, Yororo & other delinquent students beat Otsumun in the marathon & regain back the normal Kazama.

== Cast ==
- Yumiko Kobayashi as Shinnosuke Nohara
- Miki Narahashi as Misae Nohara
- Toshiyuki Morikawa as Hiroshi Nohara
- Satomi Kōrogi as Himawari Nohara
- Mari Mashiba as Toru Kazama and Shiro
- Tamao Hayashi as Nene Sakurada
- Teiyū Ichiryūsai as Masao Sato
- Chie Satō as Bo Suzuki
- Ryō Hirohashi as Chishio Atsuki
- Tetsu Inada as Ringleader
- Yoshiko Kamei as Homeroom teacher
- Ayumu Murase as Sasuga
- Ayaka Saitō as Nororo
- Rei Sakuma as Otsumun
- Taro Yamaguchi as Headmaster of Tenkasu Academy
- Riisa Naka as Ageha
- Osada Shouhei (Chocolate Planet) as Yoyo, the delinquents of Class Kasu
- Matsuo Shun (Chocolate Planet) as Kyuushoku Bukuro (Lunch bag)
- Fuwa-chan as herself

== Music ==
- Hashirigaki (Jottings): Macaroni Enpitsu

== Release ==
The film was initially scheduled to be released on April 23, 2021, in Japan, but was postponed to July 30, 2021, due to the COVID-19 pandemic. It was later released by Muse Communication in Singapore on September 9, 2021, and in Malaysia on November 18 as Crayon Shin-chan: School Mystery! The Splendid Tenkasu Academy. The film is released on Blu-ray and DVD on 4 February 2022. In India, the film was telecasted on Sony YAY! on August 11, 2024, as Shin-chan and The Mystery of Tenkasu Academy.

== Box office ==
Here is a table which shows the box office of this movie of all the weekends in Japan:

#	Rank	Weekend	Weekend gross	Total gross till current weekend	Ref.
1	2	July 30–August 1	¥307,303,000 (US$2.81 million)	¥307,303,000 (US$2.81 million)	
2	4	August 6–8	¥144,722,100 (US$1.31 million)	¥705,022,800 (US$6.37 million)	
3	4	August 13–15	¥124,974,150 (US$1.14 million)	¥1,171,715,250 (US$10.72 million)	
4	7	August 20–22	¥59,800,750 (US$544,900)	¥1,394,860,950 (US$12.71 million)	
5	10	August 27–29	¥41,067,700 (US$373,700)	¥1,511,441,050 (US$13.8 million)	
6	10+	September 3–5	¥32,214,100 (US$293,300)	¥1,572,327,700 (US$14.31 million)	
7	10	September 10–12	—N/a	¥1,610,000,000 (US$14.65 million)	
8	10+	September 17–19	¥22,607,250 (US$206,600)	¥1,643,661,950 (US$15.02 million)	

== See also ==
- List of Crayon Shin-chan films
