= Crayon Shin-chan: Roar! Kasukabe Animal Kingdom =

Crayon Shin-chan the Movie: Roar! Kasukabe Animal Kingdom
- Theatrical release poster
- Kanji: クレヨンしんちゃん オタケベ!カスカベ野生王国
- Revised Hepburn: Kureyon Shinchan: Otakebe! Kasukabe Yasei Ōkoku
- Directed by: Akira Shigino
- Screenplay by: Isao Shizuya
- Based on: Crayon Shin-chan by Yoshito Usui
- Produced by: Yuki Yoshida; Atsushi Kaji; Rika Tsuruzaki; Kensuke Suzuki
- Starring: Akiko Yajima; Miki Narahashi; Keiji Fujiwara; Satomi Kōrogi
- Cinematography: Toshiyuki Umeda
- Edited by: Toshihiko Kojima
- Music by: Kei Wakakusa; Toshiyuki Arakawa; Minoru Maruo
- Production company: Shin-Ei Animation
- Distributed by: Toho
- Release date: April 18, 2009
- Running time: 97 minutes
- Country: Japan
- Language: Japanese
- Box office: ¥1 billion (US$10.7 million)

Crayon Shin-chan: Roar! Kasukabe Animal Kingdom (クレヨンしんちゃん オタケベ!カスカベ野生王国, Kureyon Shinchan: Otakebe! Kasukabe Yasei Ōkoku), also known as Crayon Shin-chan: Roar! Kasukabe Wild Kingdom, is a 2009 anime film. It is the 17th film based on the popular comedy manga and anime series Crayon Shin-chan. The film was released to theatres on April 18, 2009, in Japan.

== Plot ==
Mamoru Shizime, the new mayor of Kasukabe city starts ecology activities. Shinnosuke picks a mysterious small bottle containing light green liquid while cleaning the riverbank and takes it home. That night, Hiroshi and Misae drink that mistakenly. Then they gradually begin to transform into animals. Hiroshi gets transformed into a rooster and Misae gets transformed into a leopardess (or a jaguar). When Shinnosuke's friends visit them, a mysterious group led by a man named Bunbetsu suddenly appears and try to capture them but fails. They manage to escape and gets help from a woman named Victoria, but eventually get caught because Hiroshi, who got turn into a rooster went to a falseful direction where it leads to Bunbetsu's Corn Trap. They are brought in front of Mamoru Shizime who is actually the leader of the "Save Keeping Beautiful Earth" (SKBE), and is executing the "Human Animalization Plan", a plan to stop environmental destruction by turning humans into animals. The drink that even Hiroshi and Misae drank was the "Human Animalization drink" that he developed for the plan and turned humans into animals. And a human who once drinks that and becomes an animal, all the memories of being a human being will erased forever.

Shinnosuke his friends (Kasukabe Defence Force), Himawari and Victoria escapes but his parents are taken away through an airship. Shinnosuke with Victoria reaches to his home. Victoria leaves from there to the headquarters of SKBE. Shinnosuke, along with Himawari and Shiro also prepares for leaving just before his friends come to his house transformed into a bat, penguin, rabbit, and pangolin (but only remained their human heads) due to drinking the partially prepared animalization drink. They leave from there.

They notice Bunbetsu and follow him, they reach to an untouched forest spreads out in the underground cavity of Kasukabe, and there was a base in the center of it. They uses the power of animals to overcome the henchmen, but get caught due to Shinnosuke. Shinnosuke confronts his parents who have become completely animals.

Shinnosuke gets hurt by Misae who became a leopardess. Misae regains her memory and escaped from the room and released the Kasukabe Defense Force being forced to generate human power. The Nohara family defeats SKBE executive Maihashi, and the defense team uses the power of animals to gain an advantage. Victoria sneaks in and is captured first, but wakes up and destroys the base. Hiroshi finally regain their memories when the drainage facilities gets destroyed and they reach to Kasukabe railway station.

However, all humans of Kasukabe city is transformed into animals as Mamoru is still executing his plan. A monument emerges from the basement and the final battle between Mamoru and the Noharas begins. Shizime transforms into a Chimera with a special drink named DX and hunts down the Nohara family Shinnosuke also transforms into an elephant but dite to being small he fails to fight. At that time Himawari who became a polar bear comes to help and the situation reverses. Then Victoria comes and reveals her identity to be Yoshiko Shizime, wife of Mamoru. The reason why Mamoru made a radical plan was not only the despair of human beings who do not care about nature, but also the fact that Yoshiko didn't care of nature. Yoshiko decides tries to drink an animalization drink, but Mamoru smash the bottle into pieces to his love towards his wife. He leaves good mission and apologize. The Shizime couples have reconciled, all the animalized humans have returned to their original state, Hiroshi is more environmentally conscious than ever, and the usual daily life has returned.

== Cast ==
- Akiko Yajima as Shinnosuke Nohara
- Miki Narahashi as Misae Nohara
- Keiji Fujiwara as Hiroshi Nohara
- Satomi Kōrogi as Himawari Nohara
- Mari Mashiba as Toru Kazama and Shiro
- Tamao Hayashi as Nene Sakurada
- Teiyū Ichiryūsai aa Masao Sato
- Chie Satō as Bo Suzuki
- Yūko Gotō as Yoshiko Shizime aka Victoria
- Takahiro Yamamoto as Bunbetsu ("Sorting" in Hindi Dubbed)
- Ai Orikasa as Maihashi
- Kōichi Yamadera as Mamoru Shizime
- Jero as himself

== Soundtrack ==
The theme song of the film is Yanchamichi (やんちゃ道; Naughty Way) by Jero.

== Staff ==
- Original: Yoshito Usui
- Director: Akira Shigino
- Screenplay: Isao Shizuya
- Storyboard: Akira Shigino and Noriyuki Nakamura
- Animation director: Katsunori Hara and Hideo Hariganeya
- Character Design: Katsunori Hara and Yuichiro Sueyoshi
- Cinematography: Toshiyuki Umeda
- Editor: Toshihiko Kojima
- Sound director: Akira Okuma
- Music: Kei Wakakusa, Toshiyuki Arakawa and Minoru Maruo
- Chief producer: Taisuke Wada, Noboru Sugiyama, Yoko Matsushita and Kazuki Nakashima
- Producer: Yuki Yoshida, Atsushi Kaji, Rika Tsuruzaki and Kensuke Suzuki
- Production: Shin-Ei Animation, TV Asahi, ADK and Futabasha

== Box office ==
The film debuted on 323 cinema halls in Japan. It ranked as ninth highest-grossing anime film in Japan.

Here is a table which shows the box office of this movie of all the weekends in Japan:

#	Rank	Weekend	Weekend gross	Total gross till current weekend	Ref.
1	4	April 18 – 19	US$1,694,368	US$1,694,368	
2	4	April 25 – 26	US$1,576,723	US$3,570,937	
3	6	May 2 – 3	US$1,256,445	US$5,942,719	
4	8	May 9 – 10	US$466,778	US$9,565,631	
5	10	May 16 – 17	US$359,192	US$9,969,963	

== See also ==
- List of Crayon Shin-chan films
