= New Dimension! Crayon Shin-chan the Movie: Battle of Supernatural Powers ~Flying Sushi~ =

2023 Japanese animated film

- Theatrical release poster

Japanese name
- Kanji: しん次元! クレヨンしんちゃんTHE MOVIE 超能力大決戦 ~とべとべ手巻き寿司~
Transcriptions
- Revised Hepburn: Shin Jigen! Kureyon Shin-chan za Mūbī Chounouryoku Daikessen Tobe Tobe Temakizushi
- Directed by: Hitoshi Ône
- Screenplay by: Hitoshi Ône
- Based on: Crayon Shin-chan by Yoshito Usui
- Starring: Yumiko Kobayashi; Miki Narahashi; Toshiyuki Morikawa; Satomi Kōrogi; Mari Mashiba
- Music by: Toshiyuki Arakawa; Shinji Miyazaki
- Production companies: Shirogumi; Shin-Ei Animation
- Distributed by: Toho
- Release date: August 4, 2023
- Running time: 93 minutes
- Country: Japan
- Language: Japanese
- Box office: $23.6 million

New Dimension! Crayon Shin-chan the Movie: Battle of Supernatural Powers ~Flying Sushi~ (しん次元! クレヨンしんちゃんTHE MOVIE 超能力大決戦 ~とべとべ手巻き寿司~, Shin Jigen! Kureyon Shin-chan za Mūbī Chounouryoku Daikessen Tobe Tobe Temakizushi) is a 2023 Japanese animated film produced by Shirogumi and Shin-Ei Animation. It is overall the 31st film and first 3D CG animated movie of the anime series Crayon Shin-chan. The film was written and directed by Hitoshi Ône and was released on August 4, 2023.

== Premise ==
After a white light from space passes through Earth, kindergartner Shinnosuke gains telekinetic superpowers. A fellow dark light gives a man named Mitsuru Hiriya divine powers of his own, which he uses to attempt to destroy the Earth. While Japan is in the grip of fear, Shinnosuke remains its new Hero.

== Cast ==
- Yumiko Kobayashi as Shinnosuke Nohara
- Miki Narahashi as Misae Nohara
- Toshiyuki Morikawa as Hiroshi Nohara
- Satomi Kōrogi as Himawari Nohara
- Mari Mashiba as Shiro and Toru Kazama

== Soundtrack ==
- Theme song: "Future is Yours" by Sambomaster.

== Release ==
The film got theatrical release in Japan on 04 August 2023. It aired in India on 08 June 2024 on Sony YAY! as Shin-chan And Battle Of Supernatural Powers.In Hindi, Tamil, Telugu, Kannada, Malayalam and Bengali.

== Box office ==
According to Box Office Mojo, it grossed $23.65 million at the box office and became the highest grossing film in the Crayon Shin-chan franchise.

== See also ==
- List of Crayon Shin-chan films
