= Crayon Shin-chan: Pursuit of the Balls of Darkness =

- Theatrical release poster

Japanese name
- Kanji: クレヨンしんちゃん 暗黒タマタマ大追跡
Transcriptions
- Revised Hepburn: Kureyon Shinchan: Ankoku Tamatama Daitsuiseki
- Directed by: Keiichi Hara
- Written by: Yoshito Usui
- Screenplay by: Keiichi Hara
- Based on: Crayon Shin-chan by Yoshito Usui
- Produced by: Hitoshi Mogi; Kenji Ōta; Takashi Horiuchi
- Starring: Akiko Yajima; Miki Narahashi; Keiji Fujiwara; Satomi Kōrogi; Daisuke Gōri; Kaneto Shiozawa; Shinya Ōtaki; Jun Hazumi; Yuriko Yamamoto; Saeko Shimazu; Keiko Yamamoto
- Cinematography: Toshiyuki Umeda
- Edited by: Hajime Okayasu
- Music by: Toshiyuki Arakawa; Shinji Miyazaki
- Production companies: Shin-Ei Animation; TV Asahi; ADK
- Distributed by: Toho
- Release date: April 19, 1997
- Running time: 100 minutes
- Country: Japan
- Language: Japanese
- Box office: ¥1.13 billion ($8.8 million)

Crayon Shin-chan: Pursuit of the Balls of Darkness (クレヨンしんちゃん 暗黒タマタマ大追跡, Kureyon Shinchan: Ankoku Tamatama Daitsuiseki), also known as Dark Tamatam Thrilling Chase!, is a 1997 Japanese animated film and the fifth installment of the Crayon Shin-chan series. It is also the first film to feature Himawari following her introduction into the series in September 1996.

== Plot ==
Shinnosuke and his dog Shiro discover an unconscious man near the lake while walking in the afternoon, where he picks up a shiny ball lying next to the man. Shinnosuke returns home and while he is distracted, his sister Himawari swallows the ball. That night, the Nohara family is attacked by the same man accompanied by his brothers. They introduce themselves as Rose, Lavender and Lemon and reveal themselves to be searching for the ball picked up by Shinnosuke. After discovering that Himawari swallowed the ball, they forcefully take the Nohara family with them to their otokonoko themed dance-bar. On the way, the brothers explain to the Noharas that they are the descendants of the Tamayura tribe of Ainu shamans.

In the past, an Ainu shaman from the Tamayumi tribe had awakened a powerful dark entity called Jack to gain magical abilities and rule the world but was defeated by the Tamayuras' ancestor. In order to prevent Jack from reawakening, the Tamayura shaman divided Jack's powers into two balls and a statue. Both balls were in the possession of the Tamayuras, until they sold off one due to financial constraints. The statue was buried deep underground but had been recently unearthed and kept in a museum, from where it was stolen by the 3 daughters of Tamao Nakamura, a descendant of the Tamayumi shaman, aiming to revive Jack. Nakamura had also got into the group a man called Hexon who achieved psychic powers from meditating in Tibet and was also in possession of the ball which had been sold off by the Tamayuras. But the Tamayuras had managed to steal that ball from Hexon at the Tokyo airport. The Noharas agree to travel alongside the Tamayuras after they explain that the Tamayumis already know through Hexon the location of the other ball and are seeking to kidnap Himawari in order to extract it.

At the dance-bar, the group is ambushed by the Tamayumis and a bodybuilder named Satake but are able to escape. The group then stops at a bathhouse to take some rest, where they are joined by Yone Higashimatsuyama, a female cop from Chiba city who was investigating into the ruckus created at the airport by the 3 brothers & after hearing their story, she joins them in an attempt to seek glory for herself. However, they are again ambushed by the Tamayumis but are able escape them. But this time, Yone and Hiroshi get separated from the rest of the group. Hexon however, uses his psychic abilities to locate the group.

The next morning, the Tamayumis once again attack the group at a grocery store where they had stopped to buy essentials and succeed in capturing Lemon and Lavender. Rose leads the Nohara family to his home near Mt Osore as Yone and Hiroshi rejoin the group. Rose informs his mother (who is in possession of the other ball) about the situation as she orders her soldiers to defend Himawari at all costs. She also reveals Rose, Lemon and Lavender's real names to be Takeshi, Kiyoshi and Tsuyoshi. This time, only Hexon comes from the Tamayumis but succeeds in capturing Himawari & the other ball despite the best efforts of Takeshi, Takeshi's mother, Takeshi's mother's sword-wielding troops, Yone, Shinnosuke, Hiroshi and Misae. In the next morning using her own psychic abilities, Takeshi's mother discovers the Tamayumis to be hiding in a high-rise building by the Rainbow Bridge.

Shinnosuke, Shiro, Hiroshi, Misae, Yone and Takeshi head straight away to save Himawari. The Tamayumis insist on keeping Himawari hostage (in spite of having extracted the ball from her) in order to prevent Noharas from interfering in their plans, to which Satake disagrees, so he leaves them and returns Himawari back to the Nohara family. A fight ensues between the group and Tamao's daughters, and in midst of the chaos, Tamao and Hexon escape. Tamao and Hexon try to insert the two balls in Jack's statue. Tamao attempts to betray Hexon but to no avail. The group arrives to retrieve Jack's statue as a fight ensues, where Shinnosuke uses his humor to overcome Hexon's abilities and ultimately succeeds. However, Shinnosuke and Himawari accidentally awaken Jack by inserting the two balls into the statue, but Jack reveals that he had died many years ago and is now just an ordinary human being and no longer wields dark powers. A furious Hexon tries to kill Himawari by throwing her off the top of the high-rise building, but Shinnosuke and the rest of the group save them. As Yone arrests the Tamayumis and Hexon on charges of kidnapping and attempted murder, the Nohara family return home, while Jack & Satake join the Tamayuras at their dance-bar.

== Cast ==
- Akiko Yajima as Shinnosuke Nohara
- Miki Narahashi as Misae Nohara
- Keiji Fujiwara as Hiroshi Nohara
- Satomi Kōrogi as Himawari Nohara
- Daisuke Gōri as Rose Tamayura
- Kaneto Shiozawa as Lavender Tamayura
- Shinya Ōtaki as Lemon Tamayura
- Yuriko Yamamoto as Yone Higashimatsuyama
- Rin Mizuhara as Tamayura's mother
- Keiko Yamamoto as Tamao Nakamure
- Jun Hazumi as Hexon
- Saeko Shimazu as Chimama Maho
- Fumihiko Tachiki as Satake
- Mari Mashiba as Shiro
- Shin Aomori as Jack
- Yoshito Usui as Cartoonist
- Rokurō Naya as Bunta Takakura (principal)
- Yumi Takada as Midori Yoshinaga
- Michie Tomizawa as Ume Matsuzaka
- Tamao Hayashi as Nene Sakurada
- Teiyū Ichiryūsai as Masao Sato
- Chie Satō as Bo Suzuki

== Characters ==
=== Hexon ===
Apart from possessing remarkable physical strength, he has the psychic power to read the minds of his opponents obtained through training in Tibet. He is a blonde European with blue eyes.

=== Majo ===
It is directed by the troops of Clan Tamayumi. She is an expert in the art of rhythmic gymnastics combative.

=== Rose ===
One of the three sisters of transvestites Tamayura Clan. Pink goes with her head shaved. Her real name is Takeshi.

=== Lavender ===
One of the three sisters of transvestites Tamayura Clan. Will lime green with a shaved head. She is thin and has painted eyes. Her real name is Tsuyoshi.

=== Lemon ===
One of the three sisters of transvestites Tamayura Clan. She goes from yellow and with a shaved head. Is thin. Her real name is Kiyoshi.

=== Satake ===
He is the son of the chief of Clan Cataplines. He's champion in martial arts. He loves children. In the end, is passed to the good with Tamayura clans. Its major peculiarity is its enormous musculature.

=== Yone Higashimatsuyama ===
A policeman from Chiba. She only hits a shot in the film and is very useless. The origin of the surname is in Higashimatsuyama, Saitama Prefecture, her guns are Beretta M92 FS and M84

=== Tamao Nakamura ===
Chief of Clan Cataplines. Wears a kimono, owner of hostess club, has Kyoto accent.

=== Jack ===
Demon who had dark power. But his dark power expired on 31 December 1996.

=== Yoshito Usui ===
Cameo appearance.

== Staff ==
The names of the staff are listed below:

- Original: Yoshito Usui
- Director: Keiichi Hara
- Screenplay: Keiichi Hara
- Storyboard: Keiichi Hara
- Character design: Katsunori Hara
- Animation director: Katsunori Hara, Noriyuki Tsutsumi
- Cinematography: Toshiyuki Umeda
- Music: Toshiyuki Arakawa, Shinji Miyazaki
- Sound adjustment: Nobuhiro Shibata
- Edit: Hajime Okayasu
- Producer: Hitoshi Mogi, Kenji Ōta and Takashi Horiuchi
- Production companies: Shin-Ei Animation, TV Asahi and ADK

== Release ==
It was released on 19 April 1997 in Japan. It was released in India as Shinchan in Dark Tama Tama Thrilling Chase and aired on Hungama TV. It was released as Crayon Shinchan The Movie: The Dark Ball Chase with English subtitles on VCD by PMP Entertainment.

== See also ==
- List of Crayon Shin-chan films
