= Crayon Shin-chan the Movie: Our Dinosaur Diary =

2024 Japanese animated film

Crayon Shin-chan: Our Dinosaur Diary
- Theatrical release poster

Japanese name
- Kanji: 映画クレヨンしんちゃん オラたちの恐竜日記
Transcriptions
- Revised Hepburn: Eiga Kureyon Shin-chan Ora-tachi no Kyōryū Nikki
- Directed by: Shinobu Sasaki
- Screenplay by: Moral
- Based on: Crayon Shin-chan by Yoshito Usui
- Starring: Yumiko Kobayashi; Mari Mashiba; Miki Narahashi; Toshiyuki Morikawa; Satomi Kōrogi; Takumi Kitamura; Haruka Tomatsu; Shunsuke Itō; Yū Hanataka; Nana Mizuki
- Music by: Toshiyuki Arakawa; Hayato Matsuo; Akifumi Tada
- Production company: Shin-Ei Animation
- Distributed by: Toho
- Release date: August 9, 2024
- Running time: 106 minutes
- Country: Japan
- Language: Japanese

Crayon Shin-chan: Our Dinosaur Diary (映画クレヨンしんちゃん オラたちの恐竜日記, Eiga Kureyon Shin-chan Ora-tachi no Kyōryū Nikki) is a 2024 Japanese animated film produced by Shin-Ei Animation. It is overall the 32nd film and 31st 2D animated film of the animated series Crayon Shin-chan.

== Cast ==
- Yumiko Kobayashi as Shinnosuke "Shin-chan" Nohara
- Miki Narahashi as Misae Nohara
- Toshiyuki Morikawa as Hiroshi Nohara
- Satomi Kōrogi as Himawari Nohara
- Mari Mashiba as Tōru Kazama and Shiro
- Tamao Hayashi as Nene Sakurada
- Teiyū Ichiryūsai as Masao Sato
- Chie Satō as Bo-chan
- Takumi Kitamura as Billy Odoroki
  - Maaya Uchida as young Billy
- Haruka Tomatsu as Angela Odoroki
- Shunsuke Itō (Oswaldo) as Ammonar Itō
- Yū Hatanaka (Oswaldo) as Chu
- Nana Mizuki as Nana

== Music ==
My Hair is Bad was confirmed to perform the theme song for the film, titled Omoide o Kakenukete on June 13, 2024. Tomomi Shiiki, the band's lead singer who is a fan of the original work, wrote and composed the song.

== Production ==
The film was announced on December 11, 2023. This is the fourth film in the Crayon Shin-chan series to be directed by Shinobu Sasaki while Moral makes his feature writing debut. The film's guest cast was revealed on May 20, 2024. Additional voice actors were revealed on June 20, 2024.

== International release ==
In India, this movie was released in theatres on 9 May 2025.
