= Crayon Shin-chan: Blitzkrieg! Pig's Hoof's Secret Mission =

- Theatrical release poster
- Kanji: クレヨンしんちゃん 電撃!ブタのヒヅメ大作戦
- Revised Hepburn: Kureyon Shinchan: Dengeki! Buta no Hizume Daisakusen
- Directed by: Keiichi Hara
- Screenplay by: Keiichi Hara
- Based on: Crayon Shin-chan by Yoshito Usui
- Produced by: Hitoshi Mogi; Kenji Ōta; Takashi Horiuchi
- Starring: Akiko Yajima; Miki Narahashi; Keiji Fujiwara; Satomi Kōrogi; Kotono Mitsuishi; Tesshō Genda; Mari Mashiba; Tamao Hayashi; Teiyū Ichiryūsai; Chie Satō; Kaneto Shiozawa; Kōichi Yamadera; Minori Matsushima; Show Hayami; Hiroshi Masuoka; Junpei Takiguchi; Tarō Ishida
- Cinematography: Toshiyuki Umeda
- Edited by: Hajime Okayasu
- Music by: Shinji Miyazaki; Toshiyuki Arakawa
- Production companies: Shin-Ei Animation; TV Asahi; ADK
- Distributed by: Toho
- Release date: April 18, 1998
- Running time: 99 minutes
- Country: Japan
- Language: Japanese
- Box office: ¥1.06 billion ($8.3 million)

Crayon Shin-chan: Blitzkrieg! Pig's Hoof's Secret Mission (クレヨンしんちゃん 電撃!ブタのヒヅメ大作戦, Kureyon Shinchan: Dengeki! Buta no Hizume Daisakusen), also known as Tip and Run! Pig Hoof Battle!, is a 1998 anime film. It is the sixth film based on the popular comedy manga and anime series Crayon Shin-chan. The film was released to theatres on April 18, 1998, in Japan.

== Plot ==
The story begins when a secret agent Orioke hides on a houseboat stealing a disk necessary to launch a secret weapon from the airship of the secret society Pig's Hoof where the students of Futaba Kindergarten were dining. An airship of Pig's Hoof took the boat with Orioke, Shinnosuke, Kazama, Masao, Nene and Bo.

From there Shinnosuke, Masao, Nene, Kazama and Bo go with the agent everywhere as hostages of the Pig's Hoof. Simultaneously, an SML agent goes to the children's homes collecting photos of them to recognize and rescue them. But when he reaches the Noharas, Misae with Himawari and Hiroshi follow him to Hong Kong to rescue their son. There they get the agent to take them with him and help him.

Meanwhile, Shinnosuke and his friends, who are kidnapped along with the houseboat, are captured in the Pig's Hoof airship. Eventually, three executives of Pig's Hoof, Barrel, Blade, Mama and the leader, Mouse appear and insist that Orioke should return the disk but Orioke refuses this. They decide to take Orioke and Shinnosuke to the headquarters of Pig's Hoof.

While flying over the Tibetan plateau on the way to the headquarters, Orioke succeeds in letting Shinnosuke and his friends escape from the airship but she couldn't escape. Kin'niku and the Noharas who came to help Shinnosuke and others crash land on the ground when the plane is being attacked by the airship of Pig's Hoof. The three walk to the Pig's Hoof headquarters. On the other hand, Shinnosuke and his friends start walking toward the place in search of people, but instead they reach Pig's Hoof headquarters near Lake Manasarovar.

Shinnosuke and his friends find a secret entrance of the laboratory of Dr. Obukuro and enter. But they get caught because of the surveillance camera, and they meet with Orioke again. Mouse takes the disk back and starts the computer, Buriburizaemon is projected on it. The plan of Mouse is to spread a computer virus, (which happens to be Buriburizaemon) thereby bringing all computers around the world under his control. In the meantime, the Noharas join Shinnosuke and others.

In desperation, Dr. Obukuro invades Shinnosuke in the program to prevent the spread of computer viruses. Mouse opens a black hole-like entrance and orders him to go wild as much as he wants, but Himawari interferes with the operation of the computer.

Buriburizaemon wants to hear in Shinnosuke's words. So Shinnosuke begins to talk about "Buriburizaemon's Adventure". Buriburizaemon thanks Shinnosuke and disappears from the program. On the other hand, the Orioke defeated Mama, and the computer virus gets deleted.

However, Mouse activates the self-destruct device at the headquarters. Kin'niku commands everyone to evacuate the place. The airship carrying all of them tries to escape from the headquarters, but it is too heavy to climb because there are many people on board. At that time, when Shinnosuke saw an illusion of Buriburizaemon who pushed up the airship. When the airship safely left the headquarters, the illusion of Buriburizaemon slowly disappeared into the flames. After finishing hard work, Kin'niku and Orioke, who had previously divorced one another, remarry and went on a picnic with the Nohara family. While everyone strangely says, "It was like someone pushed up the airship at that time," Shinnosuke draws a picture of Buriburizaemon and says "The Adventures of Buriburizaemon."

== Cast ==
- Akiko Yajima as Shinnosuke Nohara
- Miki Narahashi as Misae Nohara
- Keiji Fujiwara as Hiroshi Nohara
- Satomi Kōrogi as Himawari Nohara
- Kotono Mitsuishi as Orioke
- Tesshō Genda as Kin'niku
- Tarō Ishida as Mouse
- Kaneto Shiozawa as Buriburizaemon
- Kōichi Yamadera as Barrel
- Minori Matsushima as Mama
- Show Hayami as Blade
- Junpei Takiguchi as Dr. Obukuro
- Hiroshi Masuoka as Angela Ome
- Mari Mashiba as Toru Kazama
- Tamao Hayashi as Nene Sakurada
- Teiyū Ichiryūsai as Masao Sato
- Chie Satō as Bo Suzuki
- IZAM as himself
- Yoshito Usui as Cartoonist
- Rokurō Naya as Bunta Takakura (principal)
- Yumi Takada as Midori Yoshinaga
- Michie Tomizawa as Ume Matsuzaka
- Yūko Satō as Justice

== Soundtrack ==
The theme song of the movie is PURENESS. It is written by IZAM, composed by KUZUKI and sang by SHAZNA.

== Staff ==
- Original: Yoshito Usui
- Director: Keiichi Hara
- Screenplay: Keiichi Hara
- Storyboard: Keiichi Hara
- Character Design: Katsunori Hara
- Animation director: Katsunori Hara and Noriyuki Tsutsumi
- Setting design: Masaaki Yuasa
- Cinematography: Toshiyuki Umeda
- Music: Toshiyuki Arakawa and Shinji Miyazaki
- Producer: Hitoshi Mogi, Kenji Ōta and Takashi Horiuchi
- Production companies: Shin-Ei Animation, TV Asahi and ADK

== See also ==
- List of Crayon Shin-chan films
