= Crayon Shin-chan: Honeymoon Hurricane ~The Lost Hiroshi~ =

2019 Japanese anime film

- Film poster
- Directed by: Masakazu Hashimoto
- Written by: Kimiko Ueno; Munenori Mizuno
- Based on: Crayon Shin-chan by Yoshito Usui
- Starring: Yumiko Kobayashi; Miki Narahashi; Toshiyuki Morikawa; Satomi Korogi; Mari Mashiba
- Production company: Shin-Ei Animation
- Distributed by: Toho
- Release date: April 19, 2019
- Country: Japan
- Language: Japanese
- Box office: $18.33 million

Crayon Shin-chan: Honeymoon Hurricane ~The Lost Hiroshi~ (映画クレヨンしんちゃん 新婚旅行ハリケーン 〜失われたひろし〜, Kureyon Shinchan: Shinkon Ryokō Harikēn ~Ushinawareta Hiroshi~) is a 2019 Japanese anime film produced by Shin-Ei Animation. It is the 27th film of the popular comedy manga and anime series Crayon Shin-chan. The director is Masakazu Hashimoto.

This is the last Heisei-era Crayon Shin-chan movie, released weeks before the 2019 Japanese imperial transition. It is the first Crayon Shin-chan film to feature Yumiko Kobayashi as Shinnosuke Nohara since July 6, 2018, and the last Crayon Shin-chan film to be distributed by Odex in Singapore, Malaysia and Brunei before Crayon Shin-chan's film rights were transitioned to Taiwan-based Company Muse Communication in 2020.

== Plot ==
Hiroshi and Misae have never been to a honeymoon trip to a foreign country. One day, Misae discovered an inexpensive and family-friendly holiday package to Australia and the Nohara family decided to make it their first honeymoon vacation.

Hiroshi gets kidnapped upon arrival to Australia, leaving Shinnosuke, Misae and others on a dangerous journey. It turns out that Hiroshi is the key to a secret treasure. The remaining members of the Nohara Family must rescue Hiroshi, while a mysterious masked man and treasure hunters from all over the world are after him. The struggle is among three different groups in this action-filled treasure hunting adventure.

The plot is slightly similar to the 1994 movie Crayon Shin-chan: The Hidden Treasure of the Buri Buri Kingdom, including the concepts of "cheap foreign trip", "getting kidnapped and chased", and "key to treasure". In that movie, Misae had won a holiday package to Buri Buri Kingdom, Shinnosuke who gets kidnapped was the key to the secret treasure of that kingdom, and the family was chased by treasure hunters.

== Cast ==
- Yumiko Kobayashi as Shinnosuke Nohara
- Miki Narahashi as Misae Nohara
- Toshiyuki Morikawa as Hiroshi Nohara
- Satomi Korogi as Himawari Nohara
- Mari Mashiba as Shiro

== Box office ==
The film sold 242,000 tickets and earned 289 million yen (about US$2.58 million) to rank at #3 in its opening weekend. By Seventh Weekend, the Film dropped out of the top 10 and earned overall total of 1,978,810,800 yen (about US$18.33 million) from Japan Box Office.

== TV broadcast ==
On television premiere, the film aired on TV Asahi on Saturday, September 12 and it earned a 4.4% rating.

== See also ==
- List of Crayon Shin-chan films
