= Crayon Shin-chan: Crash! Graffiti Kingdom and Almost Four Heroes =

Crayon Shin-Chan The Movie: Crash! Graffiti Kingdom and Almost Four Heroes
- Theatrical Release Poster

Japanese name
- Kanji: クレヨンしんちゃん 激突! ラクガキングダムとほぼ四人の勇者
Transcriptions
- Revised Hepburn: Kureyon Shin-chan Gekitotsu! Rakugakingudamu to Hobo Yonin no Yūsha
- Directed by: Takahiko Kyogoku
- Based on: Crayon Shin-chan by Yoshito Usui
- Starring: Yumiko Kobayashi; Miki Narahashi; Toshiyuki Morikawa; Satomi Kōrogi; Mari Mashiba; Teiyū Ichiryūsai; Chie Satō; Shizuka Itō
- Music by: Toshiyuki Arakawa
- Production company: Shin-Ei Animation
- Distributed by: Toho
- Release date: September 11, 2020
- Running time: 103 min
- Country: Japan
- Language: Japanese
- Box office: $11 million

Crayon Shin-chan: Crash! Graffiti Kingdom and Almost Four Heroes is a 2020 Japanese anime film produced by Shin-Ei Animation. It is the 28th film of the popular comedy manga and anime series Crayon Shin-chan and the first in the Reiwa era. The film was originally scheduled for release in theaters in Japan on April 24, 2020, but was postponed to September 11, 2020, due to concerns over the COVID-19 pandemic.

== Premise ==
The film's story features a "magical crayon" and centers around a floating kingdom called Rakuga Kingdom (the name is a pun on the word "rakugaki," meaning "scribbling"). The kingdom gets its energy from scribbles, but lately, the scribbles are decreasing, due to the advent of smartphones & iPads, so the kingdom is in danger of collapsing. To save the country, the Rakuga military started to capture and force children of Kasukabe to scribble. This leads Shinnosuke, along with his family and friends protect the town and Rakuga Kingdom.

== Cast ==
- Yumiko Kobayashi • Shinnosuke Nohara
- Miki Narahashi • Misae Nohara
- Toshiyuki Morikawa • Hiroshi Nohara
- Satomi Kōrogi • Himawari Nohara
- Mari Mashiba • Tōru Kazama & Shiro
- Tamao Hayashi • Nene
- Teiyū Ichiryūsai • Masao
- Chie Satō • Bo
- Shizuka Itō • Nanako
- Mizue Ōtsuka • Kouda Tori
- Hiroshi Kamiya • Buriburizaemon
- Tesshō Genda • Demon Sergeant
- Jouji Nakata • King
- Jūrōta Kosugi • Minister of Energy
- Kikuko Inoue • Shikki Jidaijin
- Kotono Mitsuishi • Ageo-Sensei
- Michie Tomizawa • Ume Matsuzaka
- Yūji Mitsuya • Wizard
- Hiroaki Hirata • Court painter
- Nobuo Tobita • Minister of Food
- Rekishi • Minister of Food Younger Brother
- Kyary Pamyu Pamyu • Hime
- Miina Tominaga • Briefs
- Tomoyo Kurosawa • Yūma
- Mamiko Noto • Yuma's mother
- Yūki Yamada (special appearance) • Minister of Defense
- Ringo-chan (special appearance) • Apple, Melon, and Strawberry

== International release ==
In India, It premiered on Sony YAY! on 15 June 2024 as Shin-chan In Rakuga Kingdom In Hindi, Tamil, Telugu, Kannada, Malayalam and Bengali.

== Box office ==
Debuting on 317 screens, the film opened at #1 and sold 212,000 tickets, earning around 262 million yen (about US$2.47 million) in its opening weekend. By the sixth weekend, the film dropped from #5 to #7 in ranking and earned an overall gross of 1,085,377,700 yen (about US$10.28 million).
