= Crayon Shin-chan the Movie: Spooky! My Yokai Vacation =

2026 Japanese animated film

- Official poster

Japanese name
- Kanji: 映画クレヨンしんちゃん奇々怪々! オラの妖怪バケーション
Transcriptions
- Revised Hepburn: Eiga Crayon Shin-chan Kikikaikai! Ora no Yōkai Bake-shon
- Directed by: Masaki Watanabe
- Screenplay by: Yoshiko Nakamura
- Based on: Crayon Shin-chan by Yoshito Usui
- Music by: Toshiyuki Arakawa; Shinji Miyazaki; Shingo Nishimura
- Production company: Shin-Ei Animation
- Distributed by: Toho Co., Ltd.
- Release date: 31 July 2026
- Running time: 101 minutes
- Country: Japan
- Language: Japanese
- Box office: ¥2.90 billion

Crayon Shin-chan the Movie: Spooky! My Yokai Vacation (Note: Japanese: 映画クレヨンしんちゃん奇々怪々! オラの妖怪バケーション, Hepburn: Eiga Crayon Shin-chan Kikikaikai! Ora no Yōkai Bake-shon) is a Japanese animated film produced by Shin-Ei Animation. It is overall the 34th film and 33rd 2D animated film of the anime series Crayon Shin-chan and was released on 31 July 2026. It is the first film in the Shin-chan series to be set in Akita, the hometown of Shin-chan's paternal grandfather, Ginnosuke Nohara.

== Synopsis ==
One summer day, strange and mysterious phenomena begin occurring across Japan, astonishing everyone, while the Nohara family travels to Akita Prefecture to visit Hiroshi's parents; during their stay, Shinnosuke unknowingly catches the attention of a suspicious shadow, and after discovering flyers for "Obake Village" promising all. You-can-eat-Chocobi, he excitedly convinces the family to go there, but as they journey deep into Akita's remote mountains, they accidentally enter the forbidden "Land of Yokai," where they face their greatest crisis yet and must find a way to return to the human world amidst a mysterious summer adventure filled with cheerful yokai.

== Cast ==
- Yumiko Kobayashi as Shinnosuke "Shin-chan" Nohara
- Miki Narahashi as Misae Nohara
- Toshiyuki Morikawa as Hiroshi Nohara
- Satomi Kōrogi as Himawari Nohara
- Chō as Ginnosuke Nohara
- Kikumi Umeda as Tsuru Nohara
- Sairi Ito as Yako
- Sakamoto (Mayurika) as squid yokai
- Nakatani (Mayurika) as flatfish yokai

== See also ==
- List of Crayon Shin-chan films
