= Crayon Shin-chan: The Hidden Treasure of the Buri Buri Kingdom =

- Theatrical release poster

Japanese name
- Kanji: クレヨンしんちゃん ブリブリ王国の秘宝
Transcriptions
- Revised Hepburn: Kureyon Shinchan: Buriburi Ōkoku no Hihō
- Directed by: Mitsuru Hongo
- Written by: Keiichi Hara; Mitsuru Hongo
- Based on: Crayon Shin-chan by Yoshito Usui
- Produced by: Hitoshi Mogi; Kenji Ōta; Takashi Horiuchi
- Starring: Akiko Yajima; Miki Narahashi; Keiji Fujiwara; Taeko Kawata; Sayuri Yamauchi; Kōsei Tomita; Kōji Nakata; Etsuko Komiya
- Cinematography: Shūko Takahashi
- Edited by: Hajime Okayasu
- Music by: Toshiyuki Arakawa
- Production company: Shin-Ei Animation
- Distributed by: Toho
- Release date: April 23, 1994
- Running time: 93 minutes
- Country: Japan
- Language: Japanese
- Box office: ¥2.06 billion ($16.1 million)

Crayon Shin-chan: The Hidden Treasure of the Buri Buri Kingdom (クレヨンしんちゃん ブリブリ王国の秘宝, Kureyon Shinchan: Buriburi Ōkoku no Hihō) is a 1994 Japanese animated film produced by Shin-Ei Animation. It is the 2nd film of the animated series Crayon Shin-chan.

== Plot ==
Prince Sunnokeshi of Buri-Buri Kingdom from the Middle East gets kidnapped by several men. The King orders Sunnokeshi's personal guard Ruru to search for Sunnokeshi.

Meanwhile in Kasukabe, strange men start spying on the Nohara family. They then trick them into winning the golden prize of a lottery wheel: a vacation to the kingdom.

While travelling to the Buri-Buri Kingdom by plane, the only two other passengers on the flight reveal themselves to be disguised members of a group called the White Snake Gang. Shinnosuke and his family escape the flight by jumping out of a hatch with parachutes.

Shinnosuke and his parents fall in a dense forest. With limited supplies, they traverse through the jungle. They are suddenly met by a group of monkeys who help them by bringing food and giving them shelter. That evening, one of the monkeys gives Shinnosuke an artifact resembling a pig's nose.

The next day, the Nohara family continue their journey. They manage to return to civilization after locating train tracks and board a train. They are met by Ruru, who mistakes Shinnosuke for Sunnokeshi. Ruru then explains her mission to the Nohara family and explains the resemblance of the two boys. Then, men from White Snake Gang appear and snatch Shinnosuke from Hiroshi, Misae and Ruru. Before the men leave, Ruru manages to attach a tracker to one of them.

Shinnosuke is taken to the White Snake base and is thrown into a cell by the gang leader Anaconda and his henchman Mr. Herb. In the cells, Shinnosuke meets Sunnokeshi who explains that the White Snake Gang is searching for the legendary Buri-Buri treasure located in a booby-trapped palace in a uninhabitated island, and that access to it can only be achieved by inserting Sunnokeshi and Shinnosuke into its keyholes.

The next day, Anaconda and Mr. Herb, along with other men from their gang, use Shinnosuke and Sunnokeshi to enter the palace. Anaconda finally gets his hands on the Buri-Buri treasure, which is seemingly a rusty oil lamp. Anaconda then performs a special dance, summoning the Buri-Buri genie capable of granting one wish.

Suddenly, Shinnosuke's parents and Ruru arrive using the tracker. Before Anaconda is able to make a wish, Shinnosuke wastes it by asking the genie to get him an autograph of his favorite news reporter. While Anaconda is angered by this, Mr. Herb finds a hidden second lamp. He then betrays Anaconda and reveals his intention to use the lamp for his own desires.

Herb performs the same dance to summon another genie, but while he is distracted, Anaconda asks the genie to make him the most powerful being in existence, a wish the genie fulfills. Anaconda then uses his powers to make Herb his everlasting slave. Ruru then steps up to battle Herb. While Herb and Ruru are fighting, Anaconda transforms into a huge monster. Sunnokeshi reveals that the only way to defeat Anaconda is to break the palace by inserting two pig nose artifacts into a spire. The two boys insert the two artifacts causing the palace to crumble. Anaconda and Mr.Herb are sealed within the genie lamp and Shinnosuke, Sunnokeshi, Hiroshi, Misae, Ruru and two henchman manage to escape from there. Sunnokeshi and Ruru then invite the others to a special party, an invitation the rest agree to.

After returning to Kasukabe, Shinnosuke tells the events of their trip to his pet dog Shiro.

== Cast ==
- Akiko Yajima as Shinnosuke Nohara
- Miki Narahashi as Misae Nohara
- Keiji Fujiwara as Hiroshi Nohara
- Yumi Takada as Midori Yoshinaga
- Mari Mashiba as Toru Kazama and Shiro
- Tamao Hayashi as Nene Sakurada
- Chie Satō as Bo Suzuki
- Reiko Suzuki as Mrs. Kitamoto (Aunt next door)
- Kōsei Tomita as Anaconda
- Koji Nakata as Mister Hub
- Seizō Katō as Buriburi Majin
- Rokurō Naya as Kuro Majin
- Yusaku Yara as Nina
- Kaneto Shiozawa as Sally
- Shigezō Sasaoka as Captain
- Takumi Yamazaki, Hirohiko Kakegawa, Naoki Bandō as Guards
- Hiro Yūki as Director
- Kōhei Miyauchi as King
- Sayuri Yamauchi as Ruru Ru Ruru
- Satomi Kōrogi as Child Colander
- Taeko Kawata as Prince Sunnokeshi
- Etsuko Komiya as Etsuko Komiya

== Staff ==
The names of the staff are listed below:

- Original: Yoshito Usui
- Director: Mitsuru Hongo
- Screenplay: Mitsuru Hongo and Keiichi Hara
- Character design: Katsunori Hara
- Animation director: Katsunori Hara and Noriyuki Tsutsumi
- Music: Toshiyuki Arakawa
- Editor: Hajime Okayasu
- Producer: Hitoshi Mogi, Takashi Horiuchi and Kenji Ōta
- Production companies: Shin-Ei Animation, TV Asahi and ADK

== Release ==
The film was released on 23 April 1994 in Japan. It was released in India on 17 October 2009 on Hungama TV entitled Shinchan and the Treasures of the Buri Buri Kingdom. It was released as Crayon Shinchan The Movie: The Secret of Buri Buri Kingdom with English subtitles on VCD by PMP Entertainment.

== See also ==
- List of Crayon Shin-chan films
