= Crayon Shin-chan: Explosion! The Hot Spring's Feel Good Final Battle =

- Theatrical release poster

Japanese name
- Kana: クレヨンしんちゃん 爆発!温泉わくわく大決戦
Transcriptions
- Revised Hepburn: Kureyon Shinchan: Bakuhatsu! Onsen Wakuwaku Daikessen
- Directed by: Keiichi Hara
- Screenplay by: Keiichi Hara
- Based on: Crayon Shin-chan by Yoshito Usui
- Produced by: Hitoshi Mogi; Kenji Ōta; Takashi Horiuchi
- Starring: Akiko Yajima; Miki Narahashi; Keiji Fujiwara; Satomi Kōrogi; Shinji Ogawa; Iemasa Kayumi; Tetsurō Tamba
- Cinematography: Toshiyuki Umeda
- Edited by: Hajime Okayasu
- Music by: Toshiyuki Arakawa; Shirō Hamaguchi; Akira Ifukube
- Production company: Shin-Ei Animation
- Distributed by: Toho
- Release date: April 17, 1999
- Running time: 110 minutes
- Country: Japan
- Language: Japanese
- Box office: 940 million ($7.3 million)

Crayon Shin-chan: Explosion! The Hot Spring's Feel Good Final Battle (クレヨンしんちゃん 爆発!温泉わくわく大決戦, Kureyon Shinchan: Bakuhatsu! Onsen Wakuwaku Daikessen), also known as Burst! Hot Spring Battle!, is seventh in the Crayon Shin-chan anime film series. It was released on April 17, 1999, in Japan along with the short film titled Kureshin Paradise! Made in Saitama (クレしんパラダイス！メイド・イン・埼玉, Kureshin paradaisu! Meido in Saitama).

== Plot ==
Shinnosuke and his family get entangled in a fight between 2 organisations called Yazuko & HotSpringG, for the survival of the hotsprings in Japan. Shinchan & family defeat Yazuka with the help of Sukunabikona & the waters of the Golden Shower Spring, over which he presides.

== Cast ==
- Akiko Yajima – Shinnosuke Nohara
- Keiji Fujiwara – Hiroshi Nohara
- Miki Narahashi – Misae Nohara
- Satomi Kōrogi – Himawari Nohara
- Kaneto Shiozawa – Buriburizaemon
- Yukari Tamura – Ibusuki
- Kotono Mitsuishi – Masumi Ageo
- Shinji Ogawa – Kusatsu
- Iemasa Kayumi – Akamamire
- Tetsurō Tamba – Sukunabikona

=== Movie characters ===
- Kusatsu

Captain of the G-Men Hot Springs. Uncle to take care of good character, but elusive, and we were 飄. Loves the bath. Shinnosuke was immediately hit it off from that atmosphere of Kusatsu was similar to Tamba. Let deceive flattered and embarrassed to be blamed the lack of sincerity from Ibusuki of subordinates and "kun ~ I Ibusuki is cute." To rage like a very high temperature hot water, and trying to fill with water bath of their own. Can have the ability to become "hot sensation" absolute, shed or just about anywhere hot water of hot springs mentioned in the fingertip. Are also skilled in martial arts, had been killed with bare hands multiple members of the armed YUZAME. In addition, G-Men members hot spring has a code name was derived from the name of the hot springs all over Japan, he Kusatsu hot springs derived from.

- Goshogake:

Members of the G-Men Hot Springs. In slightly older woman Ibusuki, China dress wearing a yukata that contains the slit like. Do not have a license for an ordinary car. Bulgogi is a health spa make it a rule to only eat when I went to. Codename spa Goshogake derived from. Degree hot spring of love without regard to undressing around and see the hot springs. Weak to massage such as Shiatsu mad agony of Joe waving the waist.

- Ibusuki

Members of the G-Men Hot Springs. In young women rather than Goshogake, mini skirt wearing red boots wearing a short skirt, such as yukata. Do not have a license for an ordinary car she also. Codename Ibusuki Onsen derived from. Pant voice is raised in the Big Sunflower rubbed the chest. Degree hot spring of love without regard to undressing around and see the hot springs. Weak to massage such as Shiatsu mad agony of Joe waving the waist.

- Dr. Akamamire;

Leader of YUZAME. 51 years of age. Middle-aged man wearing red clothes. Originally I liked the large bath, bath hate from the past was loathsome some 30 years ago. Know of the existence of the "hot water of the soul of gold," legendary hot springs within springs advance the plan over the earth, tries to crush their source. For some reason often eat the roast, along with his aides. Caught the Ibusuki-Goshogake and family field in the middle story, (in the movie version is one of the few, also say the person who won the Nohara family from this) yu "lump of gold", will give up during the "Land unhealthy" leisure torture them elicit in the basement of the home that is the source of field, a giant robot in order to crush the source sortie. To know the truth of the incident 30 years ago when it came to the home field, appeared yu "lump of gold" was further hampered by the plan will defeat the robot by Nohara family has turned into a super hero in its power but. Akamamire is to try to realize the plan by soaking in "hot water of the soul of gold" itself still, heal the heart that hamstrung themselves in the power of hot water to the contrary, the Reformed, who helped to rebuild the town broken. And what happened 30 years ago, No. 3 of the shoebox Akamamire was always in the public bath with a regular period of active duty (Shigeo Nagashima is the time of publication. uniform number of the Yomiuri Giants in the supervision of, No. 33 uniform number It was, that it was someone else to go with the key) has returned to No. 3 after publication. And "someone else" is (it also did not know until you hear him) was actually in Kusatsu.

- Kaoru Furoiran

Akamamire's mistress. Age 32 years. According to the data of the G-Men Onsen, was born in Tanashi, Tokyo city of origin. But the owner of the beauty and sexy, was dropping the heavy makeup and bath hate is hate. Sense of smell is excellent on par with the dog.

- Killer Joe Finger

Executives of YUZAME. Age 29 years. According to the data of the G-Men Onsen, Matsumoto, Nagano Prefecture. Killer of Masseur yuan. A man likes a woman than in a transvestite. Arm massage is a class of murder, torture enough even to lead. Can be punched wooden boards with only finger pressure. Why do you hate the bath (also considered only been hired because of killer unknown). During the reconstruction of the city was broken massage tired hard work of subordinates.

- Sukunabikona

Uncle Shinnosuke meet at the beginning. Shinnosuke been discovered in the place had fallen to go, get a bath. Their identity is a spirit dwells in hot water of hot springs of the soul of gold, grateful for the kindness of Shinnosuke gave me a bath yourself, laid in the basement of the house of home field for a pulse of hot water bath of the soul of gold was. Lent force to appear along with the hot spring when the Nohara family rushed to the house was destroyed and then Nohara family, was found in hot springs. Overview is similar to Kusatsu. Model name is in charge of the voice of this person Tetsuro Tamba. "In the play James Bond You say you have already entered into and bath, "which appeared in Tetsuro Tamba was" You Only Live Twice "derived from. Ground Self-Defense Force captain tank, Was sent to defeat a giant robot of YUZAME, commander of the tank corps. During the sortie, Godzilla familiar in the music (" Monster Great War put such an exciting character of the theme song ").

- Prime minister

Our model of the person at that time the Prime Minister was Keizo Obuchi. Was amazed to pun of Kusatsu and Shinnosuke.

- Yoshito Usui

Crayon Shin-chan manga artist to draw. In order to escape from the invasion of YUZAME robot receive Kasukabe, tears and go riding on the back of the truck. In addition, she appeared in the theater version of this work and final Usui. He said: "Goobye, Kasukabe."

== See also ==
- List of Crayon Shin-chan films
