= Crayon Shin-chan: Very Tasty! B-class Gourmet Survival!! =

- Directed by: Masakazu Hashimoto
- Written by: Ueno Kimiko
- Music by: Toshiyuki Arakawa
- Production company: Shin-Ei Animation
- Distributed by: Toho
- Release date: April 20, 2013
- Running time: 96 minutes
- Country: Japan
- Language: Japanese
- Box office: US$14.7 million (Japan)

Crayon Shin-chan: Very Tasty! B-class Gourmet Survival (クレヨンしんちゃん: バカうまっ！ B級グルメサバイバル！！, Kureyon Shinchan: bakauma！B-kyū gurume sabaibaru!!) is a 2013 Japanese anime film. It is the 21st film based on the popular comedy manga and anime series Crayon Shin-chan. It is directed by Masakazu Hashimoto. The film was released to theaters on April 20, 2013, in Japan. The film is produced by Shin-Ei Animation, the studio behind the anime television.

Masakazu Hashimoto is directing his first Crayon Shin-chan movie after storyboarding 2008's The Storm Called: The Hero of Kinpoko and 2011's The Storm Called: Operation Golden Spy. Yoshio Urasawa and Kimiko Ueno wrote the screenplay.

== Overview ==
Directed by Masakazu Hashimoto, this movie is part of a series that utilised the theme of "food" for the first time. On 15 January 2013, it was decided that Korokke (actor), comedian Naomi Watanabe, and chef Tatsuya Kawagoe would appear as special guests in their roles themselves.

The film's main plot centres on the competition in Japan's restaurant industry between "A-class gourmet" and "B-class gourmet". In Japan, B-class gourmet refers to cheap but classic popular street food inspired by B movie from the United States, in contrast to A-class gourmet fine dining. Masakazu Hashimoto, director of the film, admits that the plot is about an ideological conflict in food consumption, while he tried to balance the conflict by installing the antagonist's childhood experience.

== Plot ==
In the story, Shin-chan and the Kasukabe Defence Group members were supposed to go to the B-class Gourmet Carnival. Just then, a mysterious person asked Shin-chan to deliver a sauce to the carnival. But that sauce was the only legendary sauce which could save B-class gourmet, which would otherwise get eradicated if fallen into the evil hands, and only A-class gourmet would remain. Will the mischievous kindergartener Shin-chan and his friends really be able to deliver the sauce safely to the carnival and save the world's B-grade cuisine?

== Cast ==
- Akiko Yajima - Shin-chan
- Keiji Fujiwara - Hiroshi Nohara
- Miki Narahashi - Misae Nohara
- Satomi Kōrogi - Himawari Nohara
- Mie Suzuki - Masao Sato
- Mari Mashiba - Toru Kazama / Shiro
- Tamao Hayashi - Nene Sakurada
- Chie Sato - Bo-chan

Sauce's Ken
Voiced by: Shinpachi Tsuji
Fired-noodles worker. Has a clumsiness for women. Name's origin and model is Ken Takakura.
Beniko Shougano
Lover of Sauce's Ken. She gives in charge the legendary sauce to the Kasukabe defense group. Her name's origin is Beni shouga, which is a Japanese pickled ginger used mainly in yakisoba and okonomiyaki. Voiced by Japanese comedian Naomi Watanabe.
Chef Kawagoe
A real Japanese chef and cook. Voiced by Tatsuya Kawagoe himself.
Shitamachi Korokke-Don
He looks like a korokke. He is a mascot and a friendly existence. Voiced by Japanese actor KOROKKE.
Okonomiyaki's Bunta
Voiced by: Hideaki Tezuka
Appearance like Japanese okonomiyaki. Although he is usually friendly; but when angry, he puts out "Hiroshima Style Okonomiyaki".
Takoyaki's Minami
Voiced by: Jenya
Appears like Japanese takoyaki. She is the Idol of Takoyaki world.
Hataka Motsu-Curry's Okyou
Voiced by: Rika Yano
Speciality is Motsu-curry. Although she is fast and strong while fighting, but she also has a shy side.
Osaka Kushikatsu's masa
Voiced by: Kazuya Ichijō
Appears like Osaka's kushikatsu. Although he says rough words, but he is friendly towards women.
Gourmet Mappoi
Voiced by: Yuichi Nakamura
The Chief executive of A class gourmet organization. He is plotting the destruction of B class gourmet and wants only A class gourmet to thrive as the main antagonist of the film.
Caviar
Voiced by: Saori Hayami
5 star A class gourmet lovers' only Russian person. She likes caviar, and hates those people who like mayonnaise.
Truffle
Voiced by: Hiroshi Kamiya
A person of the 5 star A class gourmet lovers. Likes truffle and elegance, and deeply hates vulgarity. He owns a pig named "piggy" and frreely manipulates it.
Piggy
Voiced by: Masato Funaki
It is Truffle's pet pig. With its sensitive nose like police dogs, it is able to track the sauce.
Nishiki Foie-gras Yokozuna
Voiced by: Tōru Ōkawa
A person of the 5 star A class gourmet lovers. He likes the dish foie gras. He is characterised by a wrestler's figure, so he hates himself.
Masked Sushi Couple
Voiced by: Hōchū Ōtsuka and Yoshino Takamori
4 star member. They dance brilliantly in combination while holding the sushi, and they feed the attack. They both appear to be having a training experience in Ginza.
Steak-Rider
Voiced by: Kentaro Tone
4 star member. He's a lone rider. With his iron plated motorbike, he attacks with a grilled steak.

== Music ==
=== Opening theme song ===
Title: Kimi ni 100 Percent (Warner Music Japan)
Singer: Kyary Pamyu Pamyu

=== Insert song ===
Title: Song of Yakisoba ~sauce is love~ (やきそばの歌 〜ソース is love〜)
Singer: Toshiyuki Arakawa

=== Ending theme song ===
Title: RPG (Toys Factory Japan)
Singer/Band: SEKAI NO OWARI

== International release ==
This movie was dubbed in Hindi and released in India on Hungama TV on 19 July 2014 as Shin Chan in Very Very Tasty Tasty.

== DVD and Blu-Ray release ==
The release date of DVD and Blu-ray of the movie in Japan was 8 November 2013.

== Reception ==
It was released in 324 screens across the country on 21 April 2013, and by 22 April the number of viewers increased up to 199,993 people. Its total box office revenue was over 200,000,000 yen in the first two days of release, and was ranked second by a narrow margin. In four weeks of release, the revenue increased to 1 billion yen. The movie earned a total revenue of 1.3 billion yen. The film grossed US$12.7 million in Japan.

In 2013, the movie won Silver Award of the first Japan Food Culture Contents Award organised by the Ministry of Agriculture, Forestry and Fisheries.

== See also ==
- Crayon Shin-chan
- Yoshito Usui
