= Crayon Shin-chan: Fierceness That Invites Storm! The Singing Buttocks Bomb =

- Theatrical release poster
- Directed by: Yūji Mutō
- Screenplay by: Tetsuo Yasumi
- Based on: Crayon Shin-chan by Yoshito Usui
- Produced by: Atsuo Sugiyama (ADK); Naomi Nishiguchi (TV Asahi); Tōru Masuo (Futabasha)
- Starring: Akiko Yajima; Miki Narahashi; Keiji Fujiwara; Satomi Kōrogi
- Production company: Shin-Ei Animation
- Distributed by: Toho
- Release date: April 21, 2007
- Country: Japan
- Language: Japanese
- Box office: $14.5 million

Crayon Shin-chan: Fierceness That Invites Storm! The Singing Buttocks Bomb (クレヨンしんちゃん 嵐を呼ぶ 歌うケツだけ爆弾!, Kureyon Shinchan: Arashi o Yobu: Utau Ketsudake Bakudan!) is a 2007 anime film. It is the 15th film based on the popular manga and anime series Crayon Shin-chan.

The film was released in theatres on April 21, 2007, in Japan. It was later released on DVD in Japan on November 23, 2007.

== Characters ==
Regular Cast: Nohara family

- Shinnosuke/Shin-chan

The movie's main character. A kindergartener (5 years old).

- Shiro

The second main character of this movie. A male dog which is kept in the Nohara family.

- Hiroshi

Father of Shin-chan.

- Misae/Mitsy

Mother of Shin-chan.

- Himawari

The sister of Shin-chan.

Movie Exclusive Characters:

- Tokitsune Shigurein

Administrator of the UNTI（Unidentified Nature Team Inspection). A duty of the organization UNTI has monitoring of the space.

- Madame Butterfly

Poppies head of the opera.

- Kinpa, Ginpa

In the frame of your entourage, an eerie duo with a mask. Use techniques such as airborne and brainwashing. But it can also be seen as manipulating the pieces your wife, was a mysterious character that identity is not known until the end after all.

- Urara, Kurara, and Sarara

Three daughters belonging Poppies opera. Sarara Kurara, Urara yellow costume girl, girl girl costume red green costume.

- Dandelion

Poppies opera spies had infiltrated the UNTI. Representing the identity opera company when the late corn poppy was infiltrated into the base of UNTI.

- Gorilla and hippopotamus

Shigure hospital aides.

== Box office ==
The Motion Pictures Producers Association of Japan has posted the final box office tally of Crayon Shin-chan Movie 15: Arashi wo Yobu Utau Ketsu dake Bakudan! which earned 1.55 billion yen (US$14.5 Million) and ranked as fifth highest grossing anime film of 2007.

== See also ==
- Crayon Shin-chan
- Yoshito Usui
