= Crayon Shin-chan: My Moving Story! Cactus Large Attack! =

2015 Japanese anime film

- Singaporean theatrical release poster
- Directed by: Masakazu Hashimoto
- Written by: Ueno Kimiko
- Based on: Crayon Shin-chan by Yoshito Usui
- Starring: Akiko Yajima as Shinnosuke Nohara
- Production companies: Shin-Ei Animation; TV Asahi; ADK; Futabasha
- Distributed by: Toho
- Release date: 18 April 2015
- Running time: 104 minutes
- Country: Japan
- Language: Japanese
- Box office: US$28.4 million (¥2.29 billion)

Crayon Shin-chan: My Moving Story! Cactus Large Attack! (クレヨンしんちゃん オラの引越し物語 サボテン大襲撃, Kureyon Shinchan: Ora no Hikkoshi Monogatari Saboten Dai Shūgeki) is a 2015 Japanese anime film produced by Shin-Ei Animation. It is the 23rd film of the popular comedy manga and anime series Crayon Shin-chan. It was released on 18 April 2015 in Japanese theatres. It is directed by Masakazu Hashimoto, who also directed the 21st movie Very Tasty! B-class Gourmet Survival!!. The screenplay was written by Ueno Kimiko. The movie focuses on the Nohara family's battle with a carnivorous cactus species after moving to the fictional town of Madakueruyobaka in Mexico.

The film had grossed ¥2,225,385,300 on 29 June 2015 in Japan, thus becoming the highest grossing Crayon Shin-chan film of all time in 23 years, overtaking the 1993 movie Crayon Shin-chan: Action Kamen vs Leotard Devil, which had grossed ¥2.22 billion by a small margin. The movie grossed an all total of ¥2.29 billion in Japan.

== Plot ==
In the fictional Mexican town of Madakueruyobaka, a new species of cactus is discovered, whose buds provide a source of delicious honey. Futaba Shouji, the company where Hiroshi Nohara (Shinnosuke's father) works, sees this as a business opportunity and decides to open a branch office in Madakueruyobaka. Hiroshi is made the president of the Madaukeruyobaka branch and ordered to transfer to Mexico, where Hiroshi and his wife, Misae, decide the entire family should move.

After arriving in Mexico, the Nohara family begin their new life, adjusting to Mexican food, learning Spanish, wearing traditional Mexican attire, and meeting the locals. With the new cactus, a Cactus Festival is held in the town square, which Shinnosuke and Hiroshi attend. During the festival, one of the buds blooms, and turns into a giant killer cactus, spawning several smaller killer cacti. The cacti start attacking and eating people, causing panic. The Nohara family and town residents attempt to flee and escape the cacti. However, the only exit of the city collapses due to the Mayor of Madakueruyobaka accidentally causing the exit to explode.

While the cactus attacks again, Hiroshi and Misae try to find a means of escape, leaving the Mayor and Shinnosuke alone. The Mayor gives food to Shinnosuke, causing Shinnosuke the need to pee. Shinnosuke pees in a field where a small killer cactus shows up, causing the startled Shinnosuke to pee on the cactus, which shrivels and dies. Shinnosuke reports this discovery to the Mayor, Hiroshi, Misae, Rainbow Kamen, Carolina, and Sumaho-chan, and they figure out water is the cacti's weakness. They decide to defeat the killer cacti using water from the water supply tank. Hiroshi creates a plan to inject water into a large balloon called "Sabo-chan" and throw it at the Queen Cactus. The balloon would burst upon the cactus's thorns and kill the Queen Cactus.

The next day, the group (the Mayor, Shinnosuke, Hiroshi, Misae, Rainbow Kamen, Carolina, Sumaho-chan, and Mariachi), who name themselves the Madakueruyobaka Defense Group, enact the plan together. However, the Queen Cactus guards the balloon with its tentacles, making the balloon unable to burst. The Queen Cactus throws Shinnosuke into the air, and as he is in the air, he realizes he can use the needle of the KB badge he is wearing to burst the balloon. When Shinnosuke falls into the balloon, he pierces it with the needle. The balloon bursts with water, spouting all over the Queen Cactus, which withers and falls apart. Inside the cactus, it reveals all the previously swallowed people were alive. Peace returns to town, and the Cactus Festival resumes. The species of new cactus is never seen again, so the Mexican branch of Futaba Shouji is shut down, and Hiroshi is recalled back to the headquarters in Japan.

== Characters specific to the movie ==
Killer Cactus

It is the main villain of the movie. The new species of cactus was going to be used to revitalize Madakueruyobaka because the honey-like buds could attract tourists and companies. Its fruit resembles a dragon fruit. During the Cactus Festival, the cactus turns into multiple killer carnivorous cacti, which starts eating people in the town center. The cacti prey on people by responding to sound, and its weakness is exposure to water.

The Queen Cactus is the main cactus that the Madakueruyobaka Defense Group fights against. It has strong vitality, and if cut, can rejoin its parts by grafting. In the final battle, all the other killer cacti merged with the Queen Cactus, but it was defeated when Shinnosuke burst the balloon filled with water. The eaten people were also safely released, as the cactus had not digested them yet.

From the setting of carnivorous plants eating traveling people, the influence of the Sci-Fi novel "The Day of the Triffids" has been pointed out.

Mayor of Madakueruyobaka

His real name is Duyaggo Eraindesu. He was born in Madakueruyobaka. Due to the town's desertion, he has attempted to revitalize the town by drawing tourists and companies with the discovery of the special cactus, but was halted due to killer cactus. Initially, he was obsessed with the cactus and the revitalization of the town, but later he joins the Madakueruyobaka Defense Group with defeating the Queen Cactus.

Nene Rodriguez/Rainbow Kamen

He is a masked Mexican Lucha Libre wrestler. He likes body building, and has a high-spirited personality, he but is timid and cowardly when he has to fight. He often fakes injuries so he does not have to go to the ring. He is part of the Madakueruyobaka Defense Group. After he was called a "sissy" by Sumaho-chan, he fought the final battle with Mariachi to defeat the Queen Cactus. After the cactus incident was resolved, he fought a battle with Luchador and won.

Mariachi

He is a Mexican mariachi player man who always holds a guitar in one hand, and sings to show his love for beautiful things. Shinnosuke teases him by calling him "unemployed uncle". After returning from being eaten by a cactus, he joins the Madakueruyobaka Defense Group. He fought the final battle along with Rainbow Kamen, acting as a decoy.

Carolina

She is the Mexican nursery teacher of the kindergarten which Shinnosuke attends in Mexico. She has a bright, friendly and caring personality. Shinnosuke becomes enamored with her due to her beautiful appearance, and escorts her to the Cactus Festival. She is a part of the Madakueruyobaka Defense Group, and joins the final battle with the Queen Cactus.

Sumaho-chan/Francisca

Sumaho-chan (スマホちゃん, lit. "Smartphone Girl"), is a Mexican girl whom the Nohara family first encounters in Mexico. She is given this nickname by Shinnosuke, as she always cherishes her smartphone, holding it carefully while walking, and refusing to tell Shinnosuke her name. Her real name is Francisca. Due to her adolescence, she is blunt, shy, and moody. She is part of the Madakueruyobaka Defense Group and opens the tap of the water tank pipe as part of the plan to defeat the Queen Cactus.

Ikegamino

He is a cactus researcher and botanist who was invited to the Cactus Festival. If asked any question, he always responds with "Ii shitsumon desu ne!" (It is a good question!). This is a parody of the Japanese journalist Akira Ikegami. He taught the Nohara family and the town residents about the carnivorous cactus plant. In the bus, he was eaten by the cactus.

Bus Driver

He is the driver of the bus that connects Madakueruyobaka to the urban areas. He plays Latin music while driving, and in this way he found that the cactuses respond to sound. He was caught in the commotion when the killer cacti started eating people. He drives the survivors away, but was eaten by the killer cactus.

Uga Āna

She is a reporter of a Mexican TV station. She had come to Madakueruyobaka by helicopter for the coverage of the Cactus Festival. When the killer cactus attacked, she tried to escape in the helicopter, but the cactus responded to the helicopter's sound and she was eaten.

Nihon Erekiteru Rengō

They are a comedy group of Japan, consisting of Hosogai-san and Akemi-chan, who had come to Madakueruyobaka. Hosogai-san was soon eaten up by the killer cactus. Akemi-chan was eaten too, but since she is a robot, the cactus vomited her out.

Pub Owner

He is an elderly man with white hair, who gave shelter to the survivors in his shop. When the cactus attacked, he fought it with a shotgun, but was subsequently eaten.

Meat Shop Manager

He was one of the survivors who fled to the pub. In the pub, he fought with the killer cactus using his meat knife till the other survivors escaped to the bus.

Sheriff

He is the Sheriff of Madakueruyobaka. He always repeats after the Mayor to show his loyalty. When the killer cactus began to attack people, he shot the cactus but was eaten.

José Mendokusē

He was the only Futaba Shouji employee of the Mexico branch where Hiroshi was transferred. He has a habit of saying "Zenzen Daijoubu" (totally fine). He saved the Nohara family using his three-wheeler truck, but he was eaten due to his carelessness.

Luchador

They are Mexican-style pro-wrestlers, the male athletes of Lucha Libre. Whenever they saw Rainbow Kamen (Nene Rodriguez), they used him as a gofer. They were eaten by the killer cactus when they tried to fight with it in the ring.

Three Chihuahua Brothers

They are stray dogs whom Shiro, Shinnosuke's dog, met in Mexico. Initially, they bullied Shiro, but later became friends when he saved them from a killer cactus.

== Voice Cast ==
- Akiko Yajima as Shinnosuke Nohara
- Miki Narahashi as Misae Nohara
- Keiji Fujiwara as Hiroshi Nohara
- Satomi Korogi as Himawari Nohara
- Hiroaki Hirata as Mayor
- Kenyuu Horiuchi as Nene Rodriguez/Rainbow Kamen
- Daisuke Namikawa as Mariachi
- Maaya Sakamoto as Carolina
- Rino Sashihara as Sumaho-chan / Francisca
- Akemi-chan as Akemi-chan, herself part of the laughter duo "Nippon Erekiteru Rengou" (Japan Elekitel Union)
- Hosogai-san as Hosogai-san himself (part of Nippon Erekiteru Rengou)
- Natsumi Uga as Uga Āna

== Production ==
=== Promotion ===
Two teasers of the movie were released on 12 and 14 December 2014, and the trailer was released on 6 March 2015. Yūki Yoshida, the producer of Shin-Ei Animation said that he wanted to do things "that shake the larger setting", and wanted to bring more "panic elements" in the story.

On 24 February 2015, it was announced that Rino Sashihara of HKT48 and the comedy duo Nippon Elekitel Union would appear as guest voice artists. For Nippon Elekitel Union, it was the first time the comedy duo worked for an animation film as voice actors. The additional guest voice artist in the movie is Natsumi Uga, the announcer of TV Asahi, who voiced the reporter during the Cactus Festival.

On 25 March 2015, an event called "Kasukabe Moving Ceremony" was held in Kasukabe City Hall to symbolize the Nohara family's moving. The Embassy of Mexico in Japan welcomed Shinnosuke Nohara (costumed person) who came to get a Mexican work visa, residence permit, and voting card for his parents. These were given symbolically in his own hands by ambassador Carlos Almada. Shinnosuke Nohara (costumed person) himself visited Mexico to promote the movie. He visited various places including a school, a cactus forest, and a beach in Mexico. Also, a special screening of the movie was held and premiered in a local school.

=== Music ===
On 30 January 2015, it was announced that Yuzu had been appointed to sing the theme song of the movie, titled "OLA!!". Yuzu had been appointed for an anime OST for the first time in two years, since 2013 for the movie HUNTERxHUNTER -The LAST MISSION-. A short version of "OLA!!" was used as the ending song for the Crayon Shin-chan anime television from 6 February 2015 till May 2015.

==== Theme Song ====
Opening Theme Song

- Kimi ni 100 Percent (Warner Music Japan / unBORDE)
  - Lyrics: Yasutaka Nakata
  - Vocals: Kyary Pamyu Pamyu

Ending Theme Song

- 「OLA!!」 (SENHA & Co.)
  - Lyrics: Kenichi Maeyamada
  - Vocals: Yuzu

=== Length ===
This is the third longest running Crayon Shin-chan movie, having a running time of 104 minutes. This is the third time that a Crayon Shin-chan feature film has crossed 100 minutes of length, after the 2011 movie Crayon Shin-chan: The Storm Called: Operation Golden Spy (107 minutes) and the 2012 movie Crayon Shin-chan: The Storm Called!: Me and the Space Princess (111 minutes).

== International release ==
The movies was released in several countries outside of Japan with varying distributors. In Singapore, the movie was released in theatres on 9 July 2015 with English and Chinese subtitles, having a PG-13 rating. In Singapore, Malaysia, and Brunei, this is the first Crayon Shin-chan film to be distributed by Odex. In India, the movie was released on Hungama TV on 30 April 2017 as Shinchan Movie Kaanta Lagaa.. In Spain, the movie was released on 25 May 2019 in Kinépolis Ciudad de la Imagen after Fox (Spain) had acquired the emission rights. In Italian theatres, the movie was released on TBA film distributed by Lucky Red. In South Korea, the film grossed US$730,400 on its opening.

== Media ==
=== Special Episodes ===
In Japan on TV Asahi, three special episodes related to the movie aired in the Crayon Shin-chan anime television on 6 March 2015 (Wakai futari wa kōshite ie o katta zo), 17 April 2015 (Take no ko dai shūgeki da zo) and 1 May 2015 (Shiro no hikkoshi monogatari da zo).

=== DVD and Blu-ray ===
On 6 November 2015, the DVD and Blu-ray of the movie was released in Japan by Bandai Visual.

== See also ==
- Yoshito Usui
