= Hajime Okayasu =

Japanese film editor

Hajime Okayasu (岡安 肇, Okayasu Hajime; 29 November 1936 – 5 November 2014) was an anime and film editor and director. Okayasu was nominated for two Japanese Academy Awards: in 1997 for The Eel and in 1998 for Dr. Akagi, both for Best Editor.

== Works ==
All credits are as an editor unless otherwise indicated.

=== Anime ===
==== TV ====
- 21-emon
- The Adventures of Piccolino
- High School! Kimengumi
- Magic Knight Rayearth (both seasons)
- Ulysses 31
- Umeboshi Denka

==== OVAs ====
- Fatal Fury 2: The New Battle
- Rayearth

==== Films ====
- 21-emon: Uchū Ike! Hadashi no Princess (1992-03-07)
- The Story of Perrine: The Movie (1990-6-30, organization director)
- 3000 Leagues in Search of Mother (1980-07-19, organization director)
- The Adventures of Piccolino
- Captain Tsubasa
  - Ashita no Mukatte Hashire! (1986-03-15)
  - Ayaushi! Zen Nippon Jr. (1985-12-21)
  - Europe Daikessen (1985-07-13)
  - Sekai Daikessen!! Jr. World Cup (1986-07-12)
- Crayon Shin-chan
  - Action Mask vs. Leotard Devil (1993-07-24)
  - The Hidden Treasure of the Buri Buri Kingdom (1994-04-23)
  - Unkokusai's Ambition (1995-04-15)
  - Great Adventure in Henderland (1996-04-19)
  - Pursuit of the Balls of Darkness (1997-04-19)
  - Blitzkrieg! Pig's Hoof's Secret Mission (1998-04-18)
  - Explosion! The Hot Spring's Feel Good Final Battle (1999-04-17)
  - CrayShin Paradise: Made in Saitama (1999-04-17)
  - Jungle That Invites Storm (2000-04-22)
  - The Adult Empire Strikes Back (2001-04-21)
  - The Battle of the Warring States (2002-04-20)
  - The Kasukabe Boys of the Evening Sun (2004-04-17)
- Dohyō no Oni-tachi (1994-05-21)
- Dokaben (1977-03-19)
  - Kōshien e no Michi (1977-07-17)
- Doraemon
  - 2112: The Birth of Doraemon (1995-03-04)
  - The Day When I Was Born (2002-03-09)
  - Doraemon Comes Back (1998-03-07)
  - Ganbare! Gian!! (2001-03-10)
  - Doraemon: A Grandmother's Recollections (2000-03-04)
  - Nobita and the Legend of the Sun King (2000-03-04)
  - Nobita and the Mysterious Wind Masters (2003-03-08)
  - Nobita and the Robot Kingdom (2002-03-09)
  - Doraemon: Nobita and the Winged Braves (2001-03-10)
  - Nobita's Adventure in Clockwork City (1997-04-19)
  - Doraemon: Nobita Drifts in the Universe (1999-03-06)
  - Nobita's Fantastic Three Musketeers (1994-03-12)
  - Nobita's Galactic Express (1996-03-02)
  - Doraemon: Nobita's Genesis Diary (1995-03-04)
  - Doraemon: Nobita's the Night Before a Wedding (1999-03-06)
  - Nobita's South Sea Adventure (1998-03-07)
  - Nobita's Wannyan Space-Time Odyssey (2004-03-08)
- The Doraemons
  - Doki Doki Wildcat Engine (2000-03-04)
  - The Great Operation of Springing Insects (1998-03-07)
  - The Puzzling Challenge Letter of the Mysterious Thief Dorapan (1997-03-08)
  - Funny candy of Okashinana!? (1999-03-06)
- Dorami-chan
  - Dorami-chan: A Blue Straw Hat (1994-03-12)
  - Dorami-chan: Hello, Dynosis Kids!! (1993-03-06)
  - Dorami-chan: Mini-Dora SOS (1989-03-11)
  - Dorami-chan: Wow, The Kid Gang of Bandits (1991-03-09)
- Dorami & The Doraemons
  - Robot School's Seven Mysteries (1996-03-02)
  - Space Land's Critical Event! (2001-03-10)
- Elmer's Adventure: My Father's Dragon (1997-07-05)
- Esper Mami: Hoshizora no Dancing Doll (1988-03-12)
- Fatal Fury: The Motion Picture (1994-07-16)
- High School! Kimengumi (1986-07-12)
- Ninja Hattori-kun
  - Ninnin Furusato Taisakusen no Maki (1983-03-12)
  - Ninnin Ninpō Enikki no Maki (1982-03-13)
  - Ninja Hattori-kun + Pāman: Chōnōryoku Wars (1984-03-17)
  - Ninja Hattori-kun + Pāman: Ninja Kaijū Shippō vs Miracle Tamago (1985-03-16)
- Obake no Q-tarō
  - Tobidase! Bake Bake Taisakusen (1986-03-15)
  - Tobidase!! 1/100 no Taisakusen (1987-03-14)
- Pāman
  - Pa-Pa-Pa the Movie Pāman (2003-03-08)
  - Pa-Pa-Pa the Movie Pāman: Tako de Pon! Ashi wa Pon! (2004-03-08)
- Pro Golfer Saru
  - Kōga Hikyō! Kage no Ninpō Golfer Sanjō! (1987-03-14)
  - Super Golf World e no Chōsen!! (1986-03-15)
- Taiyō no Ko: Deta no Fua (1980-09-13)
- Ultra B: Black Hole kara no Dokusaisha B•B (1988-03-12)
- Umeboshi Denka: Uchū no Hate kara Panparopan! (1994-03-12)
- Yakyū-kyō no Uta: Kita no Ōkami, Minami no Tora (1979-09-15)
- YuYu Hakusho: Meikai Shitōhen: Honō no Kizuna (1994-04-09)

=== Live action ===
- Aitsu ni Koishite (1987-05-30)
- Ao no Shunkan (2001-05-19)
- Arashi no Kisetsu: The Young Blood Typhoon (1995-05-13)
- The Audition (1984-11-17)
- The Ballad of Narayama (1983-04-29)
- Black Rain (1989-05-13)
- Chinpui: Eri-sama Katsudō Daishashin (1990-03-10)
- Daiōjō (1998-10-10)
- Danchi Tsuma: Hiru Kudari no Yūwaku (1974-01-15)
- Dr. Akagi (1998-10-17)
- Eros + Gyakusatsu (1970)
- Fukumoto Kōhei Kaku Hashiriki (1992-08-08)
- Fukashigi Monogatari: 2-to Shiseikatsu Catalog (1988-02-27)
- Fukashigi Monogatari: 6 Katei (1988-02-27)
- Hi wa Ikiteita (1975)
- Hiru Kudari no Jōji: Henshin (1973-01-24)
- James-yama no Riran (1992-02-15)
- Joshi Daisei Sex Kaki Seminar (1973-08-04)
- Koi-gurui (1971-12-01)
- Kuroi Ame ni Utarete (1984-08-12)
- Last Frankestein (1991-04-20)
- Maruhi Gokuraku Beni Benten (1973-08-25)
- Maruhi Jorō Zangoku Iro Jigoku (1973-10-24)
- Nakibokuro (1991-09-28)
- Ningen Jōhatsu (1967)
- Rasen no Sobyō (1991-06-22)
- Rengoku Eroica (1971)
- Ryūji (2002-03-02)
- Shikidō Kōza: Nozoki Senka (1973-04-25)
- Shīkyatto (1988)
- Shiroi Shōfu: Kashin no Takamari (1974-03-02)
- Shokugyōbetsu Sex Kōryakuhō (1973-03-24)
- Sukeban Deka: Dirty Marie (1974-04-20)
- Taiyō no Ko (1974)
- Tengoku made no Hyaku Mile (2000-11-15)
- The Eel (1997-05-24)
- Uresugita Chibusa: Hitozuma (1973-02-03)
- Wakare Klaus #1 (1978-07-15)
- Warm Water Under a Red Bridge (2001-11-03)
- Watashi wa Suteta Onna (1968)
- Winds of God (1995-06-03)
- Yakuza Kwannon: Jōjo Jingi (1973-07-14)
- Yuriko Kara no Tegami (1981-06-22)
- Zegen (1987-09-05)
