= Mitsuru Hongo =

Japanese anime director

- 本郷 みつる
- Born: October 12, 1959 (age 66); Tokyo, Japan
- Other names: Sato Mitsuru (郷 満); Ushio Ranta (潮 乱太); Shibuya Pochi (渋谷 ポチ); Byōga Daisuke (猫賀 大介)
- Occupation: Animation director
- Years active: 1981–present
- Known for: Crayon Shin-chan; Chimpui

Mitsuru Hongo (本郷みつる, 本郷満, Hongō Mitsuru; born October 12, 1959) is a Japanese anime director of television and film.

Hongo originally worked at Ajiado as an animator but moved to Shin-Ei Animation where he directed Crayon Shin-chan. He left in 1996 and went on to direct Immortal Grand Prix, Outlaw Star, Reideen, Shamanic Princess, and The Candidate for Goddess. He also directed and wrote the screenplay for the feature film Sakura Wars: The Movie.

Hongo is a native of Tokyo but grew up in Niigata Prefecture.

== Filmography (as director) ==
- Ascendance of a Bookworm
- Battle Spirits: Shōnen Toppa Bashin
- Chimpui
- Crayon Shin-chan
- Deltora Quest
- Gunma-chan
- Immortal Grand Prix
- Kasumin
- Kyoro-chan
- Mainichi Kaasan
- Monster Hunter Stories: Ride On
- Outlaw Star
- Pilot Candidate
- Reideen
- Sakura Wars: The Movie
- Shamanic Princess
- Shiratori Reiko de Gozaimasu!
- Spirit of Wonder
- Tenkai Knights
- The Yuzuki Family's Four Sons
- World Trigger
