= Teiyū Ichiryūsai =

Japanese voice actress

Ichiryūsai Teiyū
- 一龍斎貞友
- Born: Mieko Suzuki; June 20, 1958 (age 68); Osaka, Japan
- Occupation: Voice actress
- Years active: 1981–present

Mieko Suzuki (鈴木 三枝子, Suzuki Mieko; born June 20, 1958), better known by the stage names Teiyū Ichiryūsai (一龍斎 貞友 (Ichiryūsai Teiyū)) and Mie Suzuki (鈴木 みえ, Suzuki Mie), is a Japanese voice actress and kōdan-shi known for voicing Masao Sato in Crayon Shin-chan, Sumire Sakura in Chibi Maruko-chan and Shinbee Fukutomi in Nintama Rantaro. She was born in Osaka.

== Filmography ==
=== Television animation ===
- Miss Machiko (1981–83) - Maruko
- Captain Tsubasa (1983–86) - Hikaru Matsuyama, Hanji Urabe, Tsuyoshi Oda
- Fist of the North Star (1984) - Bat
- Princess Sarah (1985) - Becky
- Ganbare, Kickers! (1986–87) - Naoto Hamamoto
- Saint Seiya (1986) - Daichi (Steel Saint of Fox)
- Mister Ajikko (1987–89) - Kazuma Sakai
- Oishinbo (1988–92) - Kanezawa, Keiko Mizoki
- Shin Captain Tsubasa (1989–90) - Hikaru Matsuyama, Hanji Urabe
- Sally the Witch 2 (1989-90) - Yoshiko Hanamura
- Chibi Maruko-chan (1990–) - Sumire Sakura, Futoshi Kosugi
- Marude Dameo (1991) - Norori
- 21 Emon (1991–92) - Mie
- Crayon Shin-chan (1992–) - Masao
- Nintama Rantarou (1993–) - Shinbee Fukutomi
- Waka Okami wa Shōgakusei! (2018) - Etsuko Tajima
- Isekai Izakaya "Nobu" (2018) - Narrator

=== Original video animation (OVA) ===
- Devilman The Demon Bird (1990) (Tare-chan)
- Ozanari Dungeon (1991) (Mocha)
- Jungle Wars (1991) (Sasuke)

=== Theatrical animation ===
- Mobile Suit Gundam F91 (1991) (Manuela Panopa)
- Crayon Shin-chan series (1993–present) (Masao)
- 2112: The Birth of Doraemon (1995) (Dora-rinho)
- Dorami & Doraemons: Robot School's Seven Mysteries?! (1996) (Dora-rinho)
- The Doraemons: The Puzzling Challenge Letter of the Mysterious Thief Dorapin! (1997) (Dora-rinho)
- Okko's Inn (2018)
- Nintama Rantarō: Invincible Master of the Dokutake Ninja (2024) (Shinbee Fukutomi)

=== Video games ===
- Captain Tsubasa: Dream Team (2017) - Hikaru Matsuyama, Hanji Urabe

=== Tokusatsu ===
- Singing Great Ryūgū-jō (1992) - Amberjack Origin (ep. 10)

=== Dubbed roles ===
==== Live-action ====
- Julie Walters
  - Harry Potter and the Philosopher's Stone – Molly Weasley
  - Harry Potter and the Prisoner of Azkaban – Molly Weasley
  - Harry Potter and the Order of the Phoenix – Molly Weasley
  - Harry Potter and the Half-Blood Prince – Molly Weasley
  - Harry Potter and the Deathly Hallows – Part 1 – Molly Weasley
  - Harry Potter and the Deathly Hallows – Part 2 – Molly Weasley
- Bad Teacher – Lynn Davies (Phyllis Smith)

==== Animation ====
- Cow and Chicken – Cow
- Hotel Transylvania 2 – Linda
