= Mari Mashiba =

Japanese voice actress (born 1959)

- 真柴 摩利
- Born: Mariko Sugiura (杉浦 真理子); November 21, 1959 (age 66); Gunma Prefecture, Japan
- Occupations: Voice actress; narrator
- Years active: 1980–present
- Agent: Production Baobab
- Notable credits: Crayon Shin-chan as Tōru Kazama and Shiro
- Website: Official profile

Mariko Sugiura (杉浦 真理子, Sugiura Mariko; born November 21, 1959), known professionally as Mari Mashiba (真柴 摩利, Mashiba Mari), is a Japanese voice actress affiliated with Production Baobab.

Her most well known roles are as Shinnosuke's best friend Tōru Kazama and Shinnosuke's pet dog Shiro in the long-running television anime series Crayon Shin-chan.

== Biography ==
Born in Gunma Prefecture, Japan, on November 21, 1959, Mashiba is primarily active working in television anime, radio and narration.

Mashiba has been a regular cast member on the Crayon Shin-chan television anime series for many years, voicing both Shinnosuke's best friend Tōru Kazama and Shinnosuke's pet dog Shiro.

According to Mashiba, her casting as Shiro dated back to her days as a rookie making guest appearances on Doraemon. She speculates that Akira Okuma, who served as audio director on both Doraemon and Crayon Shin-chan, gave the role of Shiro to her because he had previously cast her as various animals and secret gadgets on Doraemon.

== Personal life ==
She has a driver's license, and her special skill is drawing illustrations. She enjoys cooking, watching motorsports, and speaks in the Gunma dialect.

== Filmography ==
=== Television animation ===
- Osomatsu-kun (1988) (Hata-bou, Karamatsu)
- Crayon Shin-chan (1992) (Tōru Kazama, Shiro)

Unknown date

- 21 Emon (Rigel)
- Bonobono (Kokujira-kun's mother)
- Detective Conan (Suzuko Tanaka)
- Idol Angel Yokoso Yoko (Mario)
- Master Keaton (Victor (young))
- Miracle Girls (Takae Matsunaga)
- Mister Ajikko (Kōji Nakada)

=== Theatrical animation ===
- Doraemon: Nobita and the Birth of Japan (1989)(Boy)
- Mobile Suit Gundam 0083: The Last Blitz of Zeon (xxxx) (Cima Garahau)

=== Original video animation (OVA) ===
- Mobile Suit Gundam 0083: Stardust Memory (1991) (Cima Garahau)
- Tenchi Muyo! (1992) (Tenchi Masaki (child))

=== Video games ===
- Natsuki Crisis Battle (xxxx) (Akira Kandori)
- Magical Drop F (xxxx) (Hierophant, Sun)
- Mobile Suit Gundam: Gihren's Ambition (xxxx) (Cima Garahau)
- Mobile Suit Gundam: Encounters in Space (xxxx) (Cima Garahau)
- SD Gundam G Generation (xxxx) (Cima Garahau)
- Super Robot Wars (xxxx) (Cima Garahau)
- Tales of Rebirth (xxxx) (Zilva Madigan)
