= Toshiyuki Arakawa =

Japanese music composer

Toshiyuki Arakawa (荒川 敏行, Arakawa Toshiyuki; born 1953 in Japan) is a music composer, arranger and member of the Japanese Society for Rights of Authors, Composers and Publishers (JASRAC). He graduated from the Department of Literature at Chuo University and afterwards Nippon Columbia joined as music director. He currently works as a music producer, arranger and singer.

== Contributions ==
Arakawa has composed music for anime:

- Crayon Shin-chan
- Cyborg Kuro-chan
- Shōnen Ashibe

He has composed music for all the 23 Crayon Shinchan movies (as of 2015).
