= Miki Narahashi =

Japanese voice actress (born 1960)

- ならはし みき
- Born: January 25, 1960 (age 66); Tokyo, Japan
- Occupation: Voice actress
- Years active: 1983–present
- Agent: Arts Vision
- Height: 154 cm (5 ft 1 in)

Miki Narahashi (楢橋 美紀, Narahashi Miki; born January 25, 1960), professionally using the Hiragana ならはし みき, is a Japanese voice actress who works for Arts Vision. She was born in Tokyo.

== Notable voice roles ==
- Masao Tachibana in Captain Tsubasa (1983)
- Misae Nohara in Crayon Shin-chan (1992–present)
- Sailor Moon (Gigaros (R - 52), Chagāma (S - 104), Kotaro (SuperS - 154), Sonoko Ijuuin (Stars - 187)) (1992-97)
- Tiffany Lords in the Rival Schools series (1997)

Unknown date

- Akiko Narahashi in Crayon Shin-chan
- Ma-kun in Cyborg Kuro-chan
- Hanako Migiwa, Junko Takamiya, Yoshiko Uesugi in Chibi Maruko-chan
- Swan White and Reiko Komori in King of Braves GaoGaiGar
- Taro in Tenchi Muyo! OVA 2nd series
- Shigeru Yamaoka in Mister Ajikko
- Magical Girl Pretty Sammy (Ball Girl, Fake Sick Girl)
- Bonobono (Dai Nee-chan)
- Miracle Girls (Risa Sarashina)
- Fushigi yuugi- Mumin
- Don and Katsu in Taiko no Tatsujin (2004–present)
- Kasumi's Mother, Shikao, Masae-sensei in Kasumin
- Nachiko in Pugyuru
- Risley Law in Fairy Tail
- Inuyasha (Kanta)
- Shiki (Ikumi Itō)

== Dubbing ==
=== Live-action ===
- Ed Wood, Kathy O'Hara (Patricia Arquette)

=== Animation ===
- The Addams Family 2, Ophelia
- Camp Lazlo, Nina
- Superman: The Animated Series, Livewire
