= Yoshito Usui =

Japanese manga artist (1958-2009)

- Born: Yoshihito Usui (臼井 義人); April 21, 1958; Shizuoka, Japan
- Died: September 11, 2009 (aged 51); Shimonita, Gunma, Japan
- Body discovered: September 19, 2009
- Occupation: Manga artist
- Known for: Crayon Shin-chan
- Children: 2

Yoshito Usui (臼井 儀人, Usui Yoshito; April 21, 1958 – September 11, 2009) was a Japanese manga artist known for the popular Crayon Shin-chan series. He was born in Shizuoka City, Shizuoka Prefecture, Japan.

== Personal life ==
In 1977, he graduated from Saitama Kasukabe technical high school (埼玉県立春日部工業高等学校). After graduating he attended a part-time design-related college but dropped out. In 1979, he joined an advertising company called POP Advertising. He made his debut as a cartoonist in 1987 when Weekly Manga Action began running his Darakuya Store Monogatari.

In August 1990, his series Crayon Shin-chan began running in Weekly Manga Action, the series started as a spin-off of the character Shinnosuke Nikaido (二階堂信之介) of Darakuya Store Monogatari. An animated series based on the comics began in 1992, and a Crayon Shin-chan boom followed the release of a 1993 animated film. For a year beginning in 1995, Usui's Super Shufu Tsukimi-San comic strip ran in the magazine Manga Life.

Usui was a devotee of Jehovah's Witnesses who had a church facility constructed adjacent to his home in 1994. He was known in the industry to read out the New Testament for a full 20 minutes at each meeting with his publisher and handing them out copies of the Bible as a gift.

He and his wife raised two daughters; both had moved out of the house at the time of Usui's death.

== Death ==
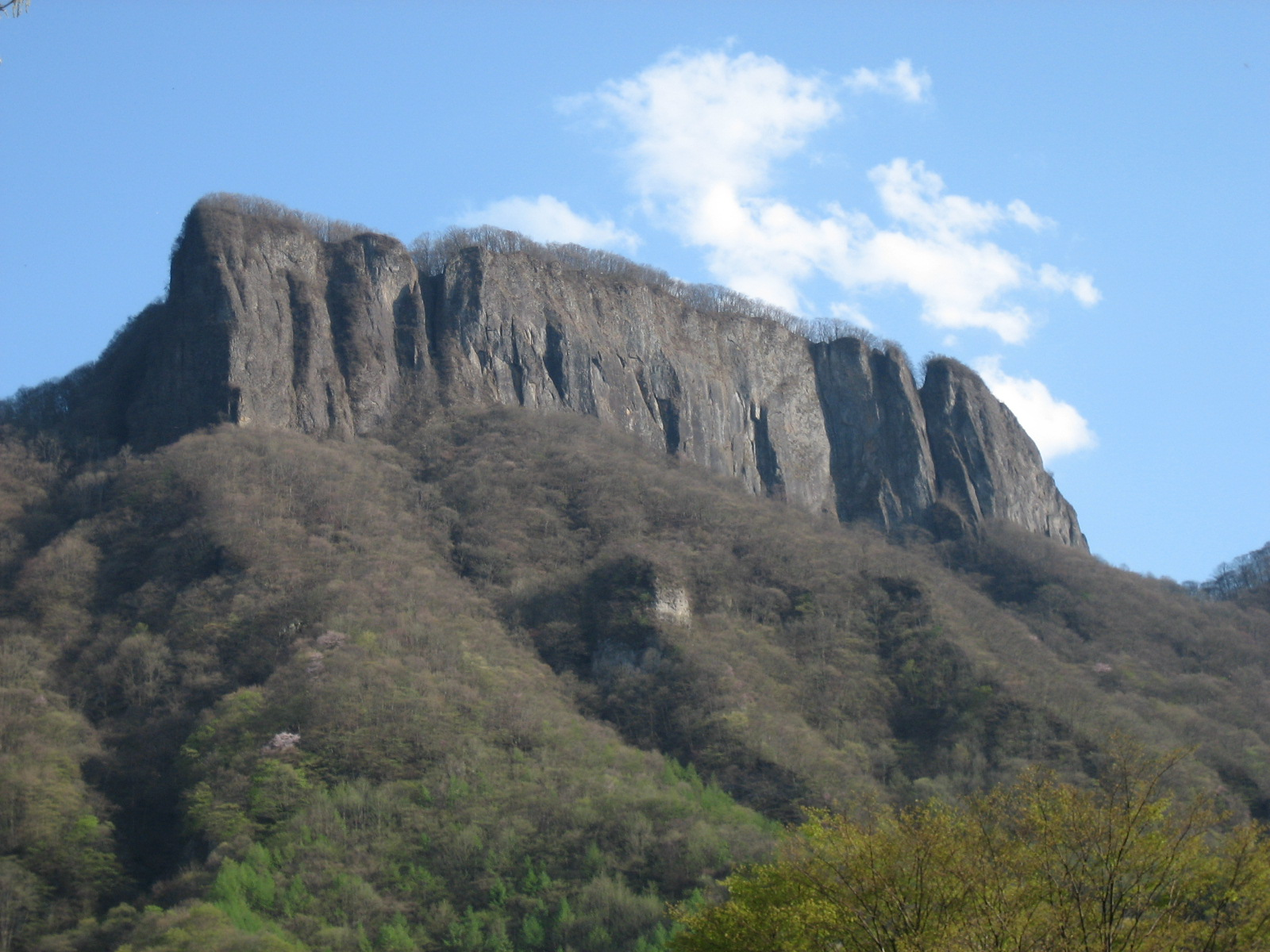
Mt. Arafune, where Usui's body was found

On September 12, 2009, Usui's family reported him missing from his hometown of Kasukabe when Usui did not return from hiking in nearby Gunma Prefecture. On September 19, 2009, a body with clothes matching those described in the report filed by Usui's family was found at the bottom of a cliff at Mount Arafune in Gunma. The body was identified by dental records and family members the next day as being that of Usui. His camera was recovered and the final shot was taken from the cliff.

His funeral was held September 23 in a private service. It was attended by three thousand people.

== Legacy ==
ONE or Tomohiro, the creator of One-Punch Man and Mob Psycho 100, cites the manga series Crayon Shin-chan by Usui as having influenced his decision to become a manga artist. Mob Psycho in particular reflects artistic inspiration from Usui.

== Works ==
- May 1987 - Darakuya Store Monogatari (だらくやストア物語, Darakuya Sutoa Monogatari)
- 1990 - Office Lady Gumi (おーえるグミ, Ōeru Gumi)
- 1990 - Crayon Shin-chan (クレヨンしんちゃん, Kureyon Shin-chan)
- 1992 - Unbalance Zone (あんBaらんすゾーン, Anbaransu Zōn)
- 1992 - Super Shufu Tsukimi-san (スーパー主婦月美さん)
- 1992 - Scramble Egg (すくらんぶるえっぐ, Sukuramburu Eggu
- 1992 - Kabushiki-gaisha Kurubushi Sangyō 24-ji ((株)くるぶし産業24時)
- 1993 - Usui Yoshito no Motto: Hiraki Naotchau zo! (臼井儀人のもっと ひらきなおっちゃうぞ!)
- 1993 - Hiraki Naotchau zo! (ひらきなおっちゃうぞ!)
- 1993 - Super Mix (すぅぱあ・みっくす, Supā Mikkusu)
- 1993 - Mix Connection (みっくす・こねくしょん, Mikkusu Konekushon)
- 1994 - Usui Yoshito no Buchikama Theater (臼井儀人のぶちかまシアター, Usui Yoshito no Buchikama Shiatā)
- 1998 - Atashira Haken Queen (あたしら派遣クイーン, Atashira Haken Kuīn)
- 2000 - Usui Yoshito Connection (臼井儀人こねくしょん, Usui Yoshito Konekushon)
- 2002 - Shiwayose Haken Gaisha K.K. (しわよせ派遣会社 (株))
