= Jankenman =

Japanese anime television series

ジャンケンマン (Jankenman)
- Genre: Adventure; Comedy
- Anime television series
- Directed by: Tetsuya Endo
- Written by: Satoru Akahori
- Music by: Takahiro Ando
- Studio: Ashi Productions
- Original network: TV Tokyo
- English network: IN: Nickelodeon India
- Original run: April 4, 1991 – March 26, 1992
- Episodes: 51
- Anime film

The Great Monster Battle
- Directed by: Tetsuya Endo
- Studio: Shochiku, Toho, Ashi Productions
- Released: July 23, 1992
- Runtime: 40 minutes
- Video game

Jankenman
- Developer: NCS
- Publisher: NCS
- Genre: Platform
- Platform: Game Boy
- Released: December 27, 1991

Jankenman (ジャンケンマン) is a children's anime series that ran from April 4, 1991, to March 26, 1992. 51 episodes have been aired. The anime series uses the well-known game of Rock paper scissors as its theme. The concept of planning and production was "an anime series that mothers and children can watch with peace of mind".

== Story ==
There is a small village called Janken Town. Jankenman protects the village from all the enemies. Meanwhile, the villain Masked Osodashi, always try to eliminate Jankenman and take over the Janken Town by deceiving people.

== Characters ==
=== Heroes ===
- Jankenman (ジャンケンマン Jankenman) – (Voiced by Ai Orikasa) – The main character and protagonist of the anime. Jankenman is the eldest son of the Jankenman Family who has been protecting Janken Town for generations. Using the energy power of peace and justice, called Janken Power which emerges whenever someone is doing the game of janken (rock, paper, scissors), Jankenman is a community-based hero who protects peace and safety for Janken Town. He lives in the Janken Base, a different spatial demension that resides inside of the jungle gym of the town's park. He enjoys playing with Aikko and his other close friends whenever there are no incidents. Jankenman has a strong sense of justice and is favorited by everyone, but has a clumsy side and is good-natured. He once has been deceived by Osodashi and his Janken Stick was stolen before because of this. In the CD album released by Nippon Columbia, Janken Village Hit Variety of Songs!, he served as a presenter, but he's still struggled to speak with others. His catchphrase when appears is "JankenPotatoHokkaido! Jankenman at Rock, Paper, Scissors!" His victory phrase is "Parsley, Celery, Cucumber, Victory!" Jankenman has made cameos in few episodes of Flower Witch Mary Bell.
- Aikko (アイコ Aiko) – (Voiced by Yuko Mizutani) – Jankenman's close friend and the Janken Hermit's granddaughter. She is Janken Town's child idol who is kind to plants and animals. She only cares about Coinder and Prince Trump. However, there are occasional scenes which makes her seem like Jankenman's love interest. She has a Wishing Baton, which will give her the power to grant wishes by magic. Her catchphrase/chant when using the Wishing Baton is "Aikko's wish, it's a tie~". Starting in episode 17, Aikko is able to fly on her Wishing Baton like a magical broom.
- Gūyan (グーヤン Gūyan) – (Voiced by Akiko Yajima) – A rock-themed boy who is the one of Jankenman's close friends. Gūyan is strong-willed, but takes kindness and friendship seriously. His personality is like a true Tokyoite. He is worried that he can only play rock in rock, paper, scissors. He is named Rocky in the English dub.
- Chokkin (チョッキン Chokkin) – (Voiced by Kotono Mitsuishi) – A scissors-themed boy who is the one of Jankenman's close friends. He has a personality like a model student and is the first to own new goods. He is good at hitting menkos while doing a flamenco-like dance and has won competitions. He is named Caesar in the English dub.
- Pājan (パージャン Pājan) – (Voiced by Chie Satō) – A paper-themed boy who is the one of Jankenman's close friends. He is an easygoing person who is a glutton. He also likes animals. His parents run a bakery store. He is named Javer in the English dub.
- Janken Hermit (ジャンケン仙人 Jankensennin) – (Voiced by Ikuya Sawaki) – Janken Mama's master and Aikko's grandfather. He exists as Janken Town's fount of knowledge.
- Janken Mama (ジャンケンママ Jankenmama) – (Voiced by Sakiko Tamagawa) – Jankenman's mother who wore a nurse's outfit and works for peace activities with Janken Papa.
- Janken Papa (ジャンケンパパ Jankenpapa) – (Voiced by Shinya Ōtaki) – Jankenman's father and a predecessor of Jankenman. He travels with Janken Mama to different countries while working for peace activities and voluntary social services. He is scatterbrained, but has a strong sense of justice just like Janken Mama and his son Jankenman.

=== Villains ===
- Masked Osodashi (オソダシ仮面 Osodashi Kamen) – (Voiced by Kazuki Yao) – The villain and the main antagonist who dreams of defeating Jankenman, turning Janken Town into "Osodashi Town" and taking over the world. He wore a blue suit and a blue mask with black visor that hides his eyes. The star-headed Osodashi family was originally an evil family lineage and rivals with the Jankenman family. However, his parents are pacifists and are anything outside of taking over the world as they use their wealth to establish all sorts of public facilities. Masked Osodashi is also an inventor who create all sorts of tools for evil. He always wear a mask in the anime, but initial settings were that he only wore the mask during his acts of evil. His true face is never shown in the anime. Masked Osodashi has a signature power of "oso dashi" janken. According to himself, it is "oso dashi" (delayed janken), not "ato dashi" (waiting to see the opponent's move before doing anything). He can not use the power inside Jankenman's Paper-Powered Janken Dome, because Janken Dome is a dome where one cannot cheat and rock-paper-scissors is played fair and square. In some episodes, Osodashi can use the black, narutomaki-shaped badge to mind-control people who wore the badge. He lives in a luxurious mansion with his parents. He is named Tricky in the English dub.
- Ururun (ウルルン Ururun) – (Voiced by Chisa Yokoyama) – A maid who works for the Osodashi family. She is forced to participate in Masked Osodashi's acts of evil, but in reality she is kind and a crybaby. She is seen to develop a crush on Masked Osodashi in episode 45 and has been kicked out of the house before for fighting with him in episode 23. Ururun also made cameos in certain episodes of Flower Witch Mary Bell.
- Pecchakucha (ペッチャクチャ Pechakucha) – (Voiced by Kouji Kurose) – A myna bird who served as Masked Osodashi's partner-in-crime. He is as devious as Osodashi himself. He has a habit of saying things out loud. He is also a coward, as seen in episode 33.

== Japanese voice cast ==
- Ai Orikasa as Jankenman
- Yuko Mizutani as Aikko
- Kazuki Yao as Masked Osodashi
- Akiko Yazima as Guuyan
- Kotono Mitsuishi as Chokkin
- Chie Sato as Parjan
- Chisa Yokoyama as Ururun
- Koji Kurose as Pechakucha
- Shinya Otaki as Janken Papa
- Sakiko Tamagawa as Janken Mama
- Ikuya Sawaki as Janken Senin

== Video game ==
Jankenman, a Game Boy action game released in 1991 by Masaya. In the game, Masked Osodashi has kidnapped Jankenman's friends and it's up to Jankenman to save them. The gameplay is similar to Super Mario Bros.. The goal is to make Jankenman reach Osodashi and fights him in a janken minigame within a time limit. The time limit also serves as the player's health; when Jankenman is hit by an enemy, the time takes away a little. If the timer ran out, the game is over.
