= One Piece season 19 =

Season of television series

One Piece
- Season 19; Whole Cake Island
- Cover for the first Japanese DVD compilation of the nineteenth season as released by Avex Pictures
- No. of episodes: 109

Release
- Original network: Fuji Television
- Original release: April 9, 2017 – June 30, 2019

Season chronology
- ← Previous; Season 18 Next → Season 20

The nineteenth season of the One Piece anime television series was produced by Toei Animation, and directed by Toshinori Fukuzawa. The season began broadcasting in Japan on Fuji Television on April 9, 2017. Like the rest of the series, it follows the adventures of Monkey D. Luffy and his Straw Hat Pirates.

The "Whole Cake Island" story arc adapts material from the rest of the 82nd volume to the beginning of the 90th volume of the manga by Eiichiro Oda. It deals with Luffy and his small team rescuing Sanji from his arranged marriage to finalize a political alliance between his own family, the Vinsmokes, and Big Mom's family. An epilogue shows the "Reverie" (or alternatively, "Levely"), (Note: Different sources use differing romanizations of レヴェリー (Reverī). All official English translations of One Piece use "Reverie", whereas the Japanese version uses "Levely" when it is rendered in Latin script.) a meeting between the royals from across the globe to discuss matters that could affect the world.

Three pieces of theme music are used for this season. The opening themes are "We Can" (ウィーキャン!), performed by Kishidan and Hiroshi Kitadani from episodes 783 to 806, "Hope", performed by Namie Amuro, taken from her best album, "Finally", (Note: Credited from episodes 809 to 855) from episodes 807 to 855, and "Super Powers", performed by V6 from episodes 856 to 891.

== Episodes ==
| No. overall (Note: Episode number by Toei Animation's count) | No. in season | Title (Note: Title of the episode: literally translated, romanized using Hepburn romanization, and in kanji form) | Directed by | Written by | Original release date (Note: Date the episode originally aired on Fuji Television) | English air date |
|---|---|---|---|---|---|---|
Whole Cake Island
| 783 | 1 | "Sanji's Homecoming! Into Big Mom's Territory!"; Transliteration: "Sanji Kikyō - Biggu Mamu no Nawabari e!" (Japanese: サンジ帰郷 ビッグ・マムの海域(ナワバリ)へ！) | Directed by : Yasunori Koyama; Storyboarded by : Tetsuya Endō | Tomohiro Nakayama | April 9, 2017 | July 5, 2026 |
As the Sanji Retrieval Team fight off a storm, they're still weak from hunger. Meanwhile, Tamago tries to convince Sanji to join Big Mom, but he refuses. When Vito shows him a picture of his fiancée, Pudding, he is immediately love-struck. However, Sanji ignores Vito and is angered when he is grouped in with Germa 66. After returning to his room, Sanji's refusal to co-operate and disrespect causes Gotti to try to attack him but is stopped by a woman, who seems familiar to Sanji. After passing through the storm and days without food, Luffy catches a giant fish while people on a sail ship begin looking for someone.
| 784 | 2 | "Zero and Four! Encountering Germa 66!"; Transliteration: "Rei to Yon - Sōgū! Jeruma Daburu Shikkusu" (Japanese: 0と4 遭遇！ジェルマ66(ダブルシックス)) | Kentarō Fujita | Shōji Yonemura | April 16, 2017 | July 12, 2026 |
After going days without food, Luffy finally manages to catch a giant fish. However, he starts eating it before Chopper discovers its skin is extremely poisonous, causing him to collapse. The Sanji Retrieval Team enters Big Mom's territory, where they come across a Germa 66 ship. They see a man on the ship who resembles Sanji, but the man reveals himself to be Sanji's younger brother Yonji, and coldly refuses the team's pleas for an antidote to save Luffy. However, Yonji's sister Reiju berates him for his attitude, kicking him off their ship before leaping onto the Thousand Sunny.
| 785 | 3 | "A Deadly Poison Crisis! Luffy and Reiju!"; Transliteration: "Mōdoku no Kiki - Rufi to Reiju!" (Japanese: 猛毒の危機 ルフィとレイジュ！) | Directed by : Yusuke Suzuki; Storyboarded by : Masahiro Hosoda | Jin Tanaka | April 23, 2017 | July 19, 2026 |
Brook recognizes Sanji's brother Yonji and his sister Reiju as members of the Vinsmoke Family which used to rule over the entire North Blue, and Reiju reveals that they still hold royal status despite losing their physical territory. Reiju then presses her mouth to Luffy's and sucks all the poison out of him, curing him. She and Yonji return to their ship, agreeing to not say anything about their encounter in order to ensure Sanji's wedding happens smoothly. Meanwhile, Aladdin sees the scene from underwater and reports the Straw Hats' presence to Jimbei. The Sanji Retrieval Team later docks at an island, and despite Pekoms' orders to wait, Luffy and Chopper run out immediately, and they come to a town made entirely out of chocolate.
| 786 | 4 | "Totto Land! Emperor Big Mom Appears!"; Transliteration: "Totto Rando! Yonkō Biggu Mamu Tōjō" (Japanese: 万国(トットランド)！四皇ビッグ・マム登場) | Directed by : Toshinori Fukuzawa; Storyboarded by : Tetsuya Endō | Tomohiro Nakayama | April 30, 2017 | July 26, 2026 |
The Sanji retrieval team disembarks on Cacao Island, an island close to Whole Cake Island in which everything on it is made of chocolate. Luffy and Chopper eat an entire café and are nearly arrested, but are saved by the cafe's owner, Charlotte Pudding. They converse with her, but Luffy accidentally reveals who he is. On Whole Cake Island, Big Mom oversees the preparation for the wedding tea party, which will occur in three days.
| 787 | 5 | "The Emperor's Daughter! Sanji's Fiancée - Pudding!"; Transliteration: "Yonkō no Musume - Sanji no Fianse Purin" (Japanese: 四皇の娘 サンジの婚約者(フィアンセ)プリン) | Katsumi Tokoro | Shōji Yonemura | May 7, 2017 | August 2, 2026 |
In Pudding's cafe on Cacao Island, Pudding and the Sanji Retrieval Team recognize each other. Together, they discuss the Charlotte Family, (which is revealed to consists of Big Mom, her thirty-nine daughters, forty-six sons and forty-three husbands, as well some grandchildren) and the upcoming wedding, and Pudding while offers to secretly help the team retrieve Sanji. Meanwhile, an agitated Sanji arrives at the Germa Kingdom. Another section of Germa 66, led by his two elder brothers, arrive at the war-torn Brock Collie Island and confer with one of its sides. Back on the Thousand Sunny, the Sanji Retrieval Team discover that Pekoms is missing, and find a warning scrawled in the bathroom. An excited Luffy nonetheless declares that they will push on.
| 788 | 6 | "A Massive Attack! Mom's Hunger Pangs!"; Transliteration: "Dai-shingeki! Kui-wazurai no Mamu" (Japanese: 大進撃！食いわずらいのマム) | Yoshihiro Ueda | Atsuhiro Tomioka | May 14, 2017 | August 9, 2026 |
On Brock Collie Island, Sanji's two older brothers end a two-year war in four hours. They then prepare to make the two-day voyage to Whole Cake Island to attend their brother's wedding. Meanwhile, the Sanji Retrieval Team sails through Totto Land, marvelling at the archipelago's sweet scenery. However, they're attacked by two giant centipedes, but Luffy manages to defeat them both. The team is suspicious of Pedro's advanced knowledge of the area and he reveals that he has been here once before. Meanwhile, Big Mom craves croquembouche that causes her to fall into madness, and she leaves a path of destruction in her wake as she searches for the treat. The ministers begin to panic as she enters Sweet City, and order the citizens to evacuate as Big Mom mindlessly wrecks the city.
| 789 | 7 | "The Capital City Falls?! Big Mom and Jimbei!"; Transliteration: "Shuto Hōkai!? Biggu Mamu to Jinbē" (Japanese: 首都崩壊!? ビッグ・マムとジンベエ) | Yasunori Koyama | Shōji Yonemura | May 21, 2017 | August 16, 2026 |
Big Mom continues her murderous rampage through Sweet City, still searching for croquembouche. Her 16th son Charlotte Moscato tries to stop her, but she steals forty years of his lifespan from him in a blind rage. However, before she can reach the castle, Jimbei races in with a pile of croquembouche tourists and feeds them to her, satiating her. With Big Mom in a good mood, Jimbei formally requests to leave her crew. Big Mom takes Jimbei to her castle in order to discuss Jimbei's request, and as they walk, Jimbei recalls his past experience with Luffy. Meanwhile, the Sanji Retrieval Team sails into the Mixed Juice Current, where the sea is composed of several juices. The team is attacked by fruit footballfish which resemble giant fruits, but Luffy kills several of them and the team feasts on their fruit bodies.
| 790 | 8 | "The Emperor's Castle! Arriving at Whole Cake Island!"; Transliteration: "Yonkō no Shiro - Hōru Kēki Airando Tōchaku" (Japanese: 四皇の城 ホールケーキアイランド到着) | Directed by : Miho Hirayama; Storyboarded by : Tetsuya Endō | Atsuhiro Tomioka | May 28, 2017 | September 6, 2026 |
Before he went to Whole Cake Island, Jimbei consulted his crew about leaving to join the Straw Hat Pirates. His crew supported him, but Aladine's wife and Big Mom's daughter Charlotte Praline warned him that no one who tried to leave her mother's crew has emerged alive. In the present, Big Mom takes Jimbei to her castle, and seems fine with him leaving, but then says he will have to lose something in return. She then takes out a roulette wheel to determine what he will lose. As night falls, the Sanji Retrieval Team gets stuck in a sea of mizuame. While they try to free themselves, Pedro reveals that he once sailed with Pekoms as explorers looking for Poneglyphs. However, he met his defeat here, though is now returning because he knows how highly Duke Dogstorm and Master Cat Viper think of the Straw Hats. He now wants to help the Straw Hats get ahold of Big Mom's Road Poneglyph, and offers to sneak in and get it while the others rescue Sanji. The next morning, the team finally reaches Whole Cake Island. They approach the coast, and to their shock they see Sanji standing on it.
| 791 | 9 | "A Mysterious Forest Full of Candies! Luffy vs. Luffy?!"; Transliteration: "Okashi na Mori - Rufi tai Rufi!?" (Japanese: お菓子な森 ルフィVS(たい)ルフィ!?) | Kentarō Fujita | Tomohiro Nakayama | June 4, 2017 | September 13, 2026 |
While Pedro and Brook take the Shark Submerge III into Whole Cake Island to look for Big Mom's Road Poneglyph, the rest of the Sanji Retrieval Team makes landfall on the island. Despite seeing Sanji multiple times, they are forced to chase after him as he constantly runs away and eludes them. They end up inside a forest made mostly of sweets, and encounter a talking crocodile that nearly eats them. While they chase after Sanji, Luffy suddenly encounters a mirrored copy of himself that perfectly reflects his movements. Not knowing what is happening, Luffy attacks his duplicate, who counters with the exact same attacks.
| 792 | 10 | "Mom's Assassin! Luffy and the Seducing Woods!"; Transliteration: "Mamu no Shikaku - Rufi to Yūwaku no Mori!" (Japanese: マムの刺客 ルフィと誘惑の森！) | Yoshihiro Ueda | Shōji Yonemura | June 11, 2017 | September 20, 2026 |
Nami, Chopper, and Carrot run from the anthropomorphic rabbit Randolph as he relentlessly attacks them, and also encounter a very large and strange man who is buried in the ground up to his neck. Unbeknownst to the trio, everything in the Seducing Woods is alive and trying to trap and kill them. Meanwhile, Sanji has arrived at his family's castle, where he reunites with Yonji. Yonji tries to berate his brother for trying to resist his arranged marriage, and the two's argument results in them attacking each other. Back in the forest, the Sanji Retrieval Team reunites with Luffy as they attempt to run back to the shore. However, each time they run to where they came from, they end up in the same clearing. They then realize that everything is alive, and the Luffy with them is revealed to be the mirror duplicate he was fighting earlier. Mirrored Luffy returns to her true appearance: the eighth daughter of the Charlotte Family, Charlotte Brûlée. Brûlée captures Nami and prepares to slice up her and Carrot's faces with her fingernails.
| 793 | 11 | "A Seafaring Kingdom! Germa's King Judge!"; Transliteration: "Kaiyū Kokka - Jeruma no Ō Jajji" (Japanese: 海遊国家 ジェルマの王ジャッジ) | Katsumi Tokoro | Jin Tanaka | June 18, 2017 | October 4, 2026 |
The world's only seafaring nation, the Germa Kingdom sails into Whole Cake Island as Sanji wallows in its castle. There, he is approached by his father Vinsmoke Judge, who confronts him over his scuffle with Yonji, which resulted in Yonji's face being bashed in. When Sanji gives him the cold shoulder, Judge challenges his estranged son to a duel. Sanji proves to unexpectedly be a match for his father, and as they fight he recalls being abused as a child by his brothers, which Judge did nothing to stop. Meanwhile, Luffy is hunted down by the anthropomorphic flora of the Seducing Woods as he searches for his teammates alone.
| 794 | 12 | "A Battle Between Father and Son! Judge vs. Sanji!"; Transliteration: "Oyako Taiketsu - Jajji tai Sanji!" (Japanese: 父子対決 ジャッジVS(たい)サンジ！) | Directed by : Miho Shiraishi; Storyboarded by : Tetsuya Endō | Atsuhiro Tomioka | June 25, 2017 | October 4, 2026 |
Sanji and Judge continue fighting, and Sanji is overwhelmed by Judge's high-tech weapons. Judge then sacrifices one of his soldiers to get the jump on Sanji, defeating him. Reiju treats Sanji's wounds, and Judge has explosive cuffs placed on his son, forcing him to go through with the wedding with his cooking ability on the line. Meanwhile, Luffy continues racing through the Seducing Woods, and is attacked by the forest's anthropomorphic flora. He beats them all up, but suddenly finds his teammates, plus Sanji and Pudding, standing nearby. He chases after them, but none of them speak or acknowledge him. Meanwhile, Brook and Pedro reach Sweet City, and see a newspaper being handed out that has a picture of Jimbei on the front page.
| 795 | 13 | "A Giant Ambition! Big Mom and Caesar!"; Transliteration: "Kyodai na Yabō - Biggu Mamu to Shīzā" (Japanese: 巨大な野望 ビッグ・マムとシーザー) | Ryūji Yoshiike | Tomohiro Nakayama | July 2, 2017 | October 11, 2026 |
Brook and Pedro infiltrate Sweet City, and discover in the newspaper that Jimbei has withdrawn his request to leave the Big Mom Pirates. They then encounter Pudding being forced to try on wedding dresses, as well as Tamago, who reveals that the Big Mom Pirates know everything about the Sanji Retrieval Team's locations, with the exception of Brook and Pedro's. Meanwhile, on the northwestern coast of Whole Cake Island, Capone Bege stands with his wife, Big Mom's twenty-second daughter, Charlotte Chiffon (the woman Sanji saw before), their son Capone Pez and his crew as he prepares to shoot the captured Pekoms for not complying with his wishes. He then shoots Pekoms into shark-infested waters. In the Whole Cake Chateau, Big Mom meets with Caesar Clown, as she seeks to learn the result of the gigantification research she hired him to perform. Caesar, knowing that it was impossible and having blown Big Mom's funds on hedonism, lies that Luffy and Law stalled his research when they destroyed his lab. However, Big Mom reveals that she had her eldest son Charlotte Perospero make an identical lab out of candy with his Lick-Lick Fruit powers, and gives Caesar two weeks to complete the research, threatening to have Perospero turn him into candy otherwise. In the Seducing Woods, Luffy discovers duplicates of Sanji and Pudding that act like animals. He catches them and throws them in a pile, but to his great confusion finds more and more duplicates of his crewmates.
| 796 | 14 | "The Land of Souls! Mom's Fatal Ability!"; Transliteration: "Tamashii no Kuni - Mamu no Osorubeki Nōryoku!" (Japanese: 魂の国 マムの恐るべき能力！) | Satoshi Itō | Shōji Yonemura | July 9, 2017 | October 11, 2026 |
Luffy finds Nami in the pile of his crewmates' duplicates, and she reveals what happened between them and Charlotte Brûlée. Brûlée used her Mirror-Mirror Fruit ability to trap Carrot in a mirror, and the anthropomorphic flora ambushed Nami and Chopper, subduing the latter as Nami fled. In the present, Luffy and Nami confront the buried man over what he knows, and he reveals that all the flora and fauna is alive because of receiving soul fragments from Big Mom's Soul-Soul Fruit ability; she takes a month's worth of lifespan from all Totto Land citizens as taxation and releases them into the wild and with her most powerful Homies, Prometheus, a sun and Zeus, a thundercloud, she can control the weather. When inquired as to how he knows this, the man reveals that he was once one of Big Mom's husbands. Meanwhile, Big Mom orders Charlotte Cracker, her tenth son and one of the Three Sweet Commanders in her crew to attack the Straw Hats, and he stomps through the Seducing Woods as he draws closer to Luffy, Nami, and Big Mom's ex-husband.
| 797 | 15 | "A Top Officer! The Sweet 3 General Cracker Appears!"; Transliteration: "Dai-Kanbu! San Shōsei Kurakkā Tōjō" (Japanese: 大幹部！三将星クラッカー登場) | Kentarō Fujita | Jin Tanaka | July 16, 2017 | October 18, 2026 |
Charlotte Cracker confronts Luffy and Nami and pulls the buried man, Pound, out of the ground. Cracker reveals to Pound that Big Mom gave permission to kill him, and Pound begs him to let him see his daughters Chiffon and Lola one last time. The mention of Lola's name shocks Nami, who recalls meeting her on Thriller Bark. She remembers getting a Vivre Card pointing to Lola's mother, and realizes that Lola's mother is Big Mom. Randolph, Charlotte Brûlée, and the giant tree homie King Baum arrive to finish the job against the Straw Hats, and Brûlée reveals that she has Carrot and Chopper trapped in a mirror, which she shatters. Cracker asserts that taking out their enemies is now his responsibility, and attempts to execute Pound. However, Luffy blocks his strike, and as the two fight, Nami and Pound run away. They are chased by Brûlée and the homies, but on her hunch, Nami pulls out Lola's Vivre Card. The Vivre Card emits the aura of Big Mom's powerful soul, rendering all of the homies unable to attack.
| 798 | 16 | "An Enemy Worth 800 Million! Luffy vs. Thousand Armed Cracker!"; Transliteration: "Hachi-oku no Teki - Rufi tai Senju no Kurakkā" (Japanese: 8億の敵 ルフィVS(たい)千手のクラッカー) | Yoshihiro Ueda | Tomohiro Nakayama | July 23, 2017 | October 25, 2026 |
Cracker overpowers Luffy in battle, revealing that he can multiply his limbs and weapons just by tapping on his body. Meanwhile, Nami and Pound are confronted by Brûlée and King Baum, and Brûlée tells Nami that other members of the Worst Generation had invaded their territory before, only to be quickly dealt with without even meeting Big Mom. Urouge had managed to defeat one of their Sweet Commanders, but was later taken out by Cracker. Brûlée then attacks Nami and tries to drag her into the Mirro-World, but Pound gains the resolve to attack his stepdaughter, branding himself an enemy of the Big Mom Pirates. However, Nami hits Brûlée with a thunderbolt and sends her falling back into Mirro-World, and Luffy continues to fight Cracker with determination.
| 799 | 17 | "An All-out Duel! Fourth Gear vs. the Bis-Bis Ability!"; Transliteration: "Zenryoku Shōbu - Gia Fōsu tai Bisu-Bisu no Chikara" (Japanese: 全力勝負 ギア4(フォース)VS(たい)ビスビスの能力(ちから)) | Directed by : Katsumi Tokoro; Storyboarded by : Kenji Yokoyama | Shōji Yonemura | July 30, 2017 | November 8, 2026 |
Despite his most valiant efforts, Luffy cannot overwhelm Cracker's defenses. Cracker pins Luffy down, and the Sweet Commander claims that Sanji, as a royal, should appreciate his upcoming wedding and that Luffy is doing him no favors by rescuing him. This enrages Luffy, causing him to activate Gear Fourth: Bounceman, and he finally lands a harmful blow on Cracker. Cracker is powerless before Gear Fourth's might, and his body seemingly shatters after another attack. However, Cracker's body is revealed to just be a puppet made of biscuit, and the real Cracker reveals himself to Luffy, showcasing the powers of the Bis-Bis Fruit as he creates several of the biscuit puppets that Luffy had taken so long to bring down just one of. Meanwhile, Brook and Pedro encounter some Biscuit Soldiers as well in Sweet City, but as homies, and Pedro plans to use them to enter the Whole Cake Chateau. In the Mirro-World, Chopper and Carrot struggle to move around with chain balls around their feet, but they try to look into one of the mirrors. Elsewhere in the Seducing Woods, Nami decides to use the power of her Vivre Card to force the homies to attack Cracker, much to their shock.
| 800 | 18 | "The First and the Second Join! The Vinsmoke Family!"; Transliteration: "Ichi to Ni - Shūketsu! Vinsumōku-ke" (Japanese: 1と2 集結！ヴィンスモーク家) | Directed by : Yusuke Suzuki; Storyboarded by : Aya Komaki | Atsuhiro Tomioka | August 6, 2017 | November 15, 2026 |
Luffy continues struggling against Cracker's Biscuit Soldiers; every time he destroys them, Cracker just makes more, and the Sweet Commander keeps Luffy on his toes with occasional onslaughts. However, Nami has put the homies under her command and forces them to attack Cracker against their will, Chopper and Carrot decide to exploit the Mirro-World and gain access to all the mirrors on Whole Cake Island, and Brook and Pedro hide inside a biscuit soldier homie that is going into the Whole Cake Chateau. The next day, Sanji's older brothers Vinsmoke Ichiji and Niji return to the Germa Kingdom, and the three of them reunite. However, when the Vinsmoke Family eats a meal together, Sanji and Niji quickly get into a fight over Niji's treatment of his food and cooks.
| 801 | 19 | "The Benefactor's Life! Sanji and Owner Zeff!"; Transliteration: "Onjin no Inochi - Sanji to Ōnā Zefu" (Japanese: 恩人の命 サンジと料理長(オーナー)ゼフ) | Directed by : Yasunori Koyama; Storyboarded by : Tetsuya Endō | Jin Tanaka | August 13, 2017 | November 22, 2026 |
Luffy cannot reach Cracker before Gear Fourth runs out, and he is forced to hide in the Seducing Woods for ten minutes while Cracker sends Biscuit Soldiers to look for him. Meanwhile, Sanji's argument against his family members is shut down when Judge reveals that with a single order, he can have the Baratie destroyed and Zeff killed. Sanji is deeply unnerved by this, as he remembers Zeff giving up his leg for him and acting as a real father figure to him.
| 802 | 20 | "An Angry Sanji! The Secret of Germa 66!"; Transliteration: "Ikari no Sanji - Jeruma Daburu Shikkusu no Himitsu" (Japanese: 怒りのサンジ ジェルマ66(ダブルシックス)の秘密) | Directed by : Kentarō Fujita; Storyboarded by : Takayuki Tanaka | Tomohiro Nakayama | August 20, 2017 | November 29, 2026 |
Nami saves Luffy from Cracker's Biscuit Soldier with the help of King Baum and the homies she has enslaved, and forces the homies to undergo the suicidal mission of attacking the Biscuit Soldiers. As Luffy rests inside King Baum's mouth, Cracker catches up to the group, and in anger cuts off King Baum's top. Meanwhile, in the Mirro-World, Chopper and Carrot find out Sanji's location by spying through mirrors, unaware that Brûlée is hunting them down. In the Germa Kingdom, Niji beats up Cosette in retaliation for Sanji's actions, and Sanji becomes enraged when he finds Cosette. Yonji offers to take Sanji to Niji, and leads him to the kingdom's secret cloning facility, where he reveals that Germa 66's soldiers are bred through illegal cloning techniques that Judge worked on with Vegapunk. Sanji is appalled, but when Niji and Ichiji walk in, he wastes no time in kicking Niji in the face.
| 803 | 21 | "The Past that He Let Go of! Vinsmoke Sanji!"; Transliteration: "Suteta Kako - Vinsumōku Sanji" (Japanese: 捨てた過去 ヴィンスモーク・サンジ) | Yoshihiro Ueda | Shōji Yonemura | August 27, 2017 | December 6, 2026 |
Nami confronts Cracker and tries to use various tricks against him, but they prove ineffective and he overpowers her. However, Luffy regains his Haki and rejoins the fray, taking Cracker by surprise with a Gear Second punch. In the Germa Kingdom, Sanji cannot continue fighting Niji due to the threat on Zeff, allowing Niji to pummel him. As his brothers stand over him, Sanji remembers his childhood in the Germa Kingdom. Judge had given him and his siblings superhuman abilities and had them train their skills, but Sanji continuously fell far behind his siblings' performances, causing him to be viciously bullied. Judge discovered that Sanji possessed no superhuman abilities after all, and he faked Sanji's death, locking his third son in a dungeon with an iron mask on to act like he never existed.
| 804 | 22 | "To the East Blue! Sanji's Resolute Departure!"; Transliteration: "Īsuto Burū e - Sanji Ketsui no Funade" (Japanese: 東の海(イーストブルー) へ サンジ決意の船出) | Satoshi Itō | Tomohiro Nakayama | September 3, 2017 | December 6, 2026 |
Six months into his childhood imprisonment, Sanji remembers learning to cook and bringing food to his now-deceased mother against Judge's wishes. This motivates him to continue learning to cook in the dungeon and feed the rats, which his brothers eventually find him doing; on several occasions they attack him and Reiju helps treat his injuries afterwards. After Germa 66 climb up the Red Line en route to Kojia in the East Blue, Sanji tells Reiju about his wish to be a cook and she breaks him out. Judge finds Sanji retrieving the key to his face mask and asks Sanji to never mention being his son, but lets him escape. Reiju leads Sanji to a docked boat as Germa 66's attack begins. In the present, Sanji's face is swollen from a beating by his brothers.
| 805 | 23 | "A Battle of Limits! Luffy and the Infinite Biscuits!"; Transliteration: "Genkai Shōbu - Rufi to Mugen Bisuketto" (Japanese: 限界勝負 ルフィと無限ビスケット) | Katsumi Tokoro | Atsuhiro Tomioka | September 17, 2017 | TBA |
Nami produces rain to soften Cracker's Biscuit Soldiers, allowing Luffy to eat and disable them. This goes on for several hours, leaving Cracker exhausted and angry, although Luffy's stomach is nearing its limit. Meanwhile, Brûlée finds Chopper and Carrot in Mirro-World and starts chasing them with a scythe. In the Germa Kingdom, Reiju gives Sanji a face mask to hide his swollen injuries as the Vinsmoke Family prepares to head for the Whole Cake Chateau. Sanji reveals to Reiju how he got his chivalry through Zeff's parental example on the Baratie.
| 806 | 24 | "The Power of Satiety! A New Fourth Gear Form - Tank Man!"; Transliteration: "Manpuku no Chikara - Shin Gia Fōsu Tanku Man!" (Japanese: 満腹の力 新ギア4(フォース)タンクマン！) | Directed by : Miho Hirayama; Storyboarded by : Aya Komaki | Jin Tanaka | September 24, 2017 | TBA |
Luffy is full from eating all of Cracker's biscuits for several hours, but refuses to give up, causing an enraged Cracker to attack him directly. However, Luffy activates another form of Gear Fourth known as Tankman: Full Version. Cracker is unable to penetrate Luffy and instead is sucked into his inflated body, which shoots him out at high velocity, flying all the way into Sweet City. His unconscious body is discovered by his siblings, who put Sweet City into a state of emergency. Despite Luffy's victory, Pound and King Baum warn him that Big Mom will retaliate with even greater force. Meanwhile, Chopper and Carrot finally discover Sanji through a mirror and learn where he is going, but they are caught by Brûlée. The Vinsmoke family heads out to meet Big Mom at the Whole Cake Chateau, and Sanji thinks about his crew as he reaches the point of no return.
| 807 | 25 | "A Heartbreaking Duel! Luffy vs. Sanji!"; Transliteration: "Kanashiki Kettō - Rufi tai Sanji" (Japanese: 哀しき決闘 ルフィVS(たい)サンジ) | Directed by : Takashi Ōtsuka; Storyboarded by : Yasunori Koyama | Shōji Yonemura | October 1, 2017 (Note: Episodes 807 and 808 originally aired together as a one-hour television special.) | TBA |
| 808 | 26 | "A Heartbreaking Duel! Luffy vs. Sanji!"; Transliteration: "Kanashiki Kettō - Rufi tai Sanji" (Japanese: 哀しき決闘 ルフィVS(たい)サンジ) | Takashi Ōtsuka | Shōji Yonemura | October 1, 2017 | TBA |
Part 1: Sanji has memories of his escape from the Germa Kingdom, meeting Zeff and later joining the Straw Hats as his family heads to the Whole Cake Chateau. Luffy and Nami ride King Baum out of the Seducing Woods and they contact Chopper and Carrot who reveal where Sanji is headed as they are pursued by Brûlée. They manage to hide again, but Brûlée brings Randolph, his crane and the Noble Croc into the mirror world to help her hunt the duo down, and Chopper gets the idea to gain control of Brûlée's power. Back in the real world, Luffy and Nami reach Sanji, and Luffy reunites with his crewmate. However, Sanji expels Luffy from the carriage, claiming to have accepted his royal heritage and disowning Luffy. Part 2: Luffy refuses to back down from the hostile Sanji, causing Sanji to confront him and attack him with Diable Jambe. Despite Sanji's vicious attacks, Luffy refuses to fight back or retreat, and Nami pleads with Sanji to stop to no avail. Finally, Sanji knocks Luffy out with a spinning midair kick, injuring him, and returns to his family but not before Nami slaps Sanji in the face. Enraged, Luffy yells out to Sanji as he leaves, saying that he will stay at this spot and not eat until Sanji returns, as he cannot become the Pirate King without Sanji which causes him to break down in tears as he is taken to Big Mom.
| 809 | 27 | "A Storm of Revenge! An Enraged Army Comes to Attack!"; Transliteration: "Fukushū no Arashi - Ikari no Gundan Shūrai!" (Japanese: 復讐の嵐 怒りの軍団襲来！) | Directed by : Yusuke Suzuki; Storyboarded by : Tetsuya Endō | Tomohiro Nakayama | October 15, 2017 | TBA |
After hearing about Cracker's defeat, Big Mom creates a big storm before sending a massive army out to take revenge on Luffy. She then goes to meet with the Vinsmoke Family for lunch and as they exchange pleasantries, Pudding asks Sanji via note to meet her in private later. Outside, Luffy, Nami, and King Baum watch as the enraged army heads toward them, but a steadfast Luffy refuses to move from his waiting spot.
| 810 | 28 | "The End of the Adventure! Sanji's Resolute Proposal!"; Transliteration: "Bōken no Owari - Sanji Ketsui no Puropōzu" (Japanese: 冒険の終わり サンジ決意のプロポーズ) | Directed by : Kentarō Fujita; Storyboarded by : Aya Komaki | Jin Tanaka | October 22, 2017 | TBA |
Luffy faces Big Mom's enraged army and decimates their hordes of Chess Soldiers. He struggles against the higher-ranking Big Mom Pirates, especially against the abilities of Oprea's cream-based Devil Fruit and Mont-d'Or's book-based Devil Fruit. But Nami and King Baum return to help him with Nami decimates all the Chess Soldiers using a massive lightning strike. As this battle rages on, Sanji talks to Pudding in her room and, in order to make the best of his situation, agrees to marry her tomorrow and make a life together.
| 811 | 29 | "I'll Wait Here! Luffy vs. the Enraged Army!"; Transliteration: "Koko de Matsu - Rufi tai Ikari no Gundan" (Japanese: ここで待つ ルフィVS(たい)怒りの軍団) | Directed by : Yasunori Koyama; Storyboarded by : Masahiro Hosoda | Atsuhiro Tomioka | October 29, 2017 | TBA |
In the Mirro-World, Chopper and Carrot fight against Brûlée and her henchmen, but are subdued by their own reflections. In the Whole Cake Chateau, Sanji makes a deal with Big Mom to spare his friends if he marries without resisting. In the battle with the enraged army, Amande kills King Baum by bisecting him, Galette immobilizes Nami with her Devil Fruit ability, and Luffy continues to fight until he is eventually caught, defeated and taken away with Nami.
| 812 | 30 | "Invading the Chateau! Reach the Road Poneglyph!"; Transliteration: "Shatō Sen'nyū - Ubae! Rōdo Pōnegurifu" (Japanese: 城内(シャトー)潜入 奪え！ロード歴史の本文(ポーネグリフ)) | Yoshihiro Ueda | Shōji Yonemura | November 5, 2017 | TBA |
Tamago increases security on the Big Mom Pirates' three Ponegliffs in the Room of Treasure by having Sweet Commander Charlotte Smoothie protect them. Brook spies on the room and returns to tell Pedro about security and they hatch a plan to bypass it. In the Mirro-World, Brûlée and her henchmen finally capture Chopper and Carrot. However, the two devise a plan. They are taken to Brûlée's house where Carrot is about to be cooked in a boiling pot, but Chopper prepares the plan. Big Mom shows the Vinsmoke Family her collection of rare creatures trapped inside giant books. Meanwhile, Luffy wakes up in another part of the library, and he and Nami are bound inside a book together. Big Mom departs from the Vinsmokes and calls Luffy and Nami to discuss their actions but to her surprise, Luffy responds defiantly.
| 813 | 31 | "A Fateful Confrontation! Luffy and Big Mom!"; Transliteration: "Innen no Taimen - Rufi to Biggu Mamu!" (Japanese: 因縁の対面 ルフィとビッグ・マム！) | Katsumi Tokoro | Tomohiro Nakayama | November 12, 2017 | TBA |
Big Mom informs Luffy that she found the Tamate Box among the treasure Luffy left her at Fishman Island and plans to open it at the wedding. Big Mom asks Nami about Lola and is enraged to hear that she still considers Big Mom part of her family despite refusing a politically-motivated marriage and running away. Big Mom claims that Lola's wedding would have allowed her to already become King of the Pirates and demands her location from Nami in order to assassinate her. Disgusted by her pettiness, Luffy once again challenges Big Mom. In his quarters, Sanji tries to come to terms with his decision to leave the Straw Hats and vows to give Pudding a happy marriage. Pedro runs around the Treasure Repository taking out guards, making Big Mom assume that he is after the Tamate Box.
| 814 | 32 | "Shout of the Soul! Brook & Pedro's Lightning Operation!"; Transliteration: "Tyamasī no Sakebi - Burukku ando Pedoro Dengeki Sakusen" (Japanese: 魂(テャマスィー)の叫び ブルック&ペドロ電撃作戦) | Satoshi Itō | Jin Tanaka | November 19, 2017 | TBA |
Thanks to Pedro's distraction, Brook manages to sneak into the Room of Treasure. With the power of his Devil Fruit, he overwhelms the Chess Soldier homies by the power of soul. In Brûlée's house, it is revealed that she and her henchmen captured a mirror clone of Carrot only for the real Carrot to ambush the people in the house and kick the pot onto Brûlée. Chopper then frees himself and activates Monster Point as the two prepare a counterattack. While Sanji picks flowers for Pudding, she goes to the Prisoner Library to visit Luffy and Nami, where she confesses her failure to bring Sanji to them only for Luffy and Nami gawk in shock as she continues speaking to them.
| 815 | 33 | "Goodbye! Pudding's Tearful Determination!"; Transliteration: "Sayonara - Purin Namida no Ketsui" (Japanese: さよなら プリン涙の決意) | Directed by : Yusuke Suzuki; Storyboarded by : Aya Komaki | Shōji Yonemura | November 26, 2017 | TBA |
Pudding reveals a secret plan to prevent Sanji from marrying her, shocking Luffy and Nami. After she leaves, Luffy attempts to escape from their prison. In the Mirro-World, Chopper and Carrot successfully execute their counterattack and take out Brûlée and all of her henchmen. They then plot to use Brûlée's powers to explore Mirro-World and find all their crewmates. In the Room of Treasure, Brook defeats all the guards in it and begins transcribing the Ponegliffs. However, Big Mom breaks into the room and confronts him. Meanwhile, Tamago confronts Pedro in the third floor courtyard, and it is revealed that Pedro had 50 years of his life removed during his invasion five years ago, after he and Tamago had taken out each other's left eyes. Meanwhile, the Vinsmokes plot to keep Pudding in the Germa Kingdom after the wedding in order to prevent the Big Mom Pirates from taking advantage of their deal. Reiju sneaks around the chateau, but is suddenly caught outside by someone and shot with a gun. She manages to head back inside and collapses from her injuries.
| 816 | 34 | "The History of the Left Eye! Pedro vs. Baron Tamago!"; Transliteration: "Hidarime no Innen - Pedoro tai Tamago Danshaku" (Japanese: 左眼の因縁 ペドロVS(たい)タマゴ男爵) | Masahiro Hosoda | Atsuhiro Tomioka | December 3, 2017 | TBA |
Chopper and Carrot run through the Mirro-World with Brûlée as their hostage to find Luffy, Nami and Sanji. Luffy attempts to rip his arms to escape imprisonment while Reiju is found by Pudding in a bloody state. Big Mom confronts Brook for trying steal a copy of her Road Ponegliff. Pedro battles Baron Tamago and thinks of the day he and Zepo first arrived on Whole Cake Island: They ran into Pekoms and learned that he became a member of the Big Mom Pirates. Pedro and Zepo attempt to sneak into Big Mom's Treasure Repository for her Ponegliffs but are ambushed by Tamago and the Chess Soldiers. They battle the soldiers and Tamago, even taking his left eye, until Big Mom appears. In the present, Pedro and Tamago continue their battle and talk about the day how Pedro lost is left eye. In the past, Pekoms is shocked at what his friends done while Big Mom is angry and makes spin the roulette. She makes Zepo spin it first and takes 100 years of his life, killing him as he only had 30 years left to live and tells Pedro to pay the remaining 70 years. Returning to the present again, Pedro and Tamago's battle intensifies as Tamago turns the tide around in his favor. In the past, Big Mom demands the 70 years but Pekoms managed to persuade her not to kill Pedro, however, she still demands 60 years of his life. Pedro removes his left eye and manages to make Big Mom only take 50 years of his life. In the present, Tamago continues his beat down on Pedro and questions his reason for returning. Pedro places his firm belief in the Straw Hats that they will change the world and cuts Tamago in half.
| 817 | 35 | "Moist Cigarette! The Night Before Sanji's Wedding!"; Transliteration: "Shikemoku - Sanji no Kekkon Zen'ya" (Japanese: シケモク サンジの結婚前夜) | Miho Hirayama | Shōji Yonemura | December 10, 2017 | TBA |
Luffy continues trying to escape the prison book by tearing off his hands. In a flashback, Pudding reveals to Luffy and Nami that she plans to kill Sanji during the wedding and that Big Mom does not intend to let them leave alive. Elsewhere, Sanji goes to Pudding's room and listens in on Pudding taunting Reiju as she reveals her sinister nature and a plot to assassinate the Vinsmoke Family. After hearing Pudding mocking him, Sanji becomes heartbroken.
| 818 | 36 | "The Undaunted Soul! Brook vs. Big Mom!"; Transliteration: "Fukutsu no Souru - Burukku tai Biggu Mamu" (Japanese: 不屈の魂(ソウル) ブルックVS(たい)ビック・マム) | Directed by : Kentarō Fujita; Storyboarded by : Tetsuya Endō | Tomohiro Nakayama | December 17, 2017 | TBA |
After revealing the truth about the wedding, Pudding removes Reiju's memories of their encounter with her Memo-Memo Fruit powers and has her taken to medical help so she can meet her doom at the wedding tomorrow. In the Room of Treasure, Brook tries to use his speed to attack Big Mom, but she counters his attacks. Her homies prove to be resistant to his soul power, but even after taking multiple attacks from them, Brook keeps getting up. In the Mirro-World, Chopper and Carrot find out that the mirrors can tell them where they lead to, and they work on identifying their comrades to the mirrors. Meanwhile, Luffy gets closer to ripping his arms off as Opera prepares to torture Nami for Lola's location. Suddenly, Jimbei arrives and attacks Opera to free Luffy and Nami.
| 819 | 37 | "Sora's Wish! Germa's Failure - Sanji!"; Transliteration: "Sora no Negai - Jeruma no Shippaisaku Sanji" (Japanese: 母(ソラ)の願い ジェルマの失敗作サンジ) | Yoshihiro Ueda | Jin Tanaka | December 24, 2017 | TBA |
Jimbei frees Luffy and Nami by burning the book they're trapped in, declaring an act of rebellion against Big Mom that he admits he cannot go back from. Meanwhile, Sanji visits Reiju in the medical center and informs her of the memories Pudding erased. Reiju insists that Sanji escape, but still plans to attend the wedding herself and allow Germa 66 to be taken out at the expense of her own life. Reiju explains that when their mother Sora was pregnant, she was strongly opposed to the surgery planned for her sons, as it would make them extremely strong but also emotionless; Sora took a drug to undo the surgery's effects which left her weakened but was only successful on Sanji. While Judge blames Sanji for Sora's death, Reiju tells him that Sora never regretted her actions due to Sanji being a kind child.
| 820 | 38 | "To Reach Sanji! Luffy's Vengeful Hell-bent Dash!"; Transliteration: "Sanji no Moto e - Rufi Gyakushū no Dai Gekisō!" (Japanese: サンジの元へ ルフィ逆襲の大激走！) | Yasunori Koyama | Shōji Yonemura | January 7, 2018 | TBA |
In the Chateau courtyard, Tamago regenerates into a stronger form with chicken features known as Viscount Hiyoko with his Egg-Egg Fruit power. Pedro fights Hiyoko and manages to defeat this form, but before Hiyoko regenerates into a stronger form, Pedro lights a string of bombs and attempts to take out all the surrounding enemies in a massive explosion. In the Room of Treasure, Brook's sword is unable to pierce Big Mom's skin, and he is finally defeated but not before managing to injure Prometheus. Outside the room, Smoothie hears about Luffy's breakout and orders the floors below them to be blocked off so Big Mom does not find out. Pudding then comes in and Big Mom reveals to Brook that she can awaken the ability to read the Ponegliffs with her third eye. Pudding asks Big Mom if they can talk in the latter's room. Below, Luffy fights against Charlotte Cadenza in his race to find Sanji and knocks out the pirate after choking him for Sanji's location. In the infirmary, Reiju encourages Sanji to escape and leave their family to die, revealing that she replaced the explosive cuffs on his wrists with duds.
| 821 | 39 | "The Chateau in Turmoil! Luffy, to the Rendezvous!"; Transliteration: "Shatō Dōran - Rufi Yakusoku no Basho e" (Japanese: 城内(シャトー)動乱 ルフィ約束の場所へ) | Directed by : Yusuke Suzuki; Storyboarded by : Tetsuya Endō | Tomohiro Nakayama | January 14, 2018 | TBA |
As Pedro detonates a string of dynamite at the courtyard, Chopper grabs him into the Mirro-World, before Tamago, having regenerated into the rooster-like Count Niwatori. While traveling in the Mirro-World, Chopper and Carrot manage to locate Nami and Jimbei, who are evading the Big Mom Pirates. Meanwhile, Luffy continues running through the chateau and is confronted by Cabaletta, who intends to avenge Cadenza. After a furious clash, Luffy manages to defeat Cabaletta and continues onward. Luffy eventually comes across the infirmary, where Reiju hides him from the pursuing Big Mom Pirates. Reiju informs Luffy that Sanji has been made aware of Pudding's deception and Luffy decides to return to the place where he promised to wait for Sanji. After jumping out of the Chateau and landing in Sweet City, Luffy is confronted by Chess Soldiers as he is traveling to his intended destination. While wandering in the hallways of the Chateau, Sanji decides that he will not return to the Straw Hats.
| 822 | 40 | "Deciding to Say Goodbye! Sanji and his Straw-Hat Bento!"; Transliteration: "Wakare no Ketsui - Sanji to Mugiwara Bentō" (Japanese: 別れの決意 サンジと麦わら弁当) | Kentarō Fujita | Jin Tanaka | January 21, 2018 | TBA |
Having brought Jimbei and Nami into the Mirro-World, the Sanji Retrieval Team searches for Luffy, Sanji and Brook. Inside Big Mom's chamber, Big Mom holds Brook captive and goes over the Vinsmoke assassination plan with Pudding. The Charlotte Family and Big Mom Pirates have a meeting and discuss the status of the intruders. Believing the intruders have been dealt with, the meeting is adjourned. Inside Sweet City, Luffy battles against two chess soldiers and two members of the Big Mom Pirates. Due to his hunger, Luffy initially struggles but is able to muster enough strength to defeat his opponents. Inside the chateau, Sanji sits alone in a hallway and decides to accept death. Bobbin runs into him and as he is about to eat a piece of meat from Sanji's bento box, Sanji kicks him and then flees.
| 823 | 41 | "The Emperor Rolls Over! Rescue Brook Mission!"; Transliteration: "Yonko no Negaeri - Burukku Kyūshutsu Dai-Sakusen!" (Japanese: 四皇の寝返り ブルック救出大作戦！) | Hiroyuki Satō | Atsuhiro Tomioka | January 28, 2018 | TBA |
After Sanji flees, Bobbin decides to pursue him by himself. The Sanji Retrieval Team finds the mirror leading to Brook but also learns that the mirror also leads to Big Mom's bedroom. While Big Mom is sleeping, the team plans to retrieve Brook and replace him with another skeleton. After three unsuccessful attempts, the team manage to get Brook back. As Sanji hurries towards the place where Luffy promised to wait for him, Luffy is also approaching the spot, only to be ambushed by Charlotte Counter.
| 824 | 42 | "The Rendezvous! Luffy, a One-on-One at His Limit!"; Transliteration: "Yakusoku no Basho - Rufi Genkai no Ikkiuchi" (Japanese: 約束の場所 ルフィ限界の一騎打ち) | Aya Komaki | Shōji Yonemura | February 4, 2018 | TBA |
Luffy fights against Charlotte Counter but despite his best efforts, his hunger causes him to be easily overpowered. Meanwhile, Brook reveals to the Sanji Retrieval Team that he successfully transcribed Big Mom's Ponegliffs. As the team prepares to find Sanji, Jimbei states that they should reach him before the wedding, as there is a plot going on behind the scenes that will plunge it into chaos. He reveals that Pekoms was caught up in this scheme, which resulted in him being shot by Bege. In the Whole Cake Chateau, the Vinsmokes celebrate by getting drunk and outside in Sweet City, Bobbin is shot by a mysterious gunman while pursuing Sanji who reaches the outskirts of Sweet City where Luffy promised, but cannot find him. However, he finally locates the unconscious Luffy by the remains of King Baum after hearing his stomach rumble.
| 825 | 43 | "A Liar! Luffy and Sanji!!"; Transliteration: "Usotsuki - Rufi to Sanji" (Japanese: ウソつき ルフィとサンジ) | Satoshi Itō | Shōji Yonemura | February 11, 2018 | TBA |
After a harsh struggle, Luffy finally manages to defeat Counter. He then rests besides King Baum's corpse. Sanji later arrives and finds Luffy, who wakes up from the smell of Sanji's bento. Sanji gives the bento to Luffy, relieving his hunger, while Luffy becomes happy to see Sanji again. However, Sanji once again attempts to convince Luffy to leave without him, but calmly this time. This enrages Luffy, so he punches Sanji and forces him to say his true feelings. Sanji then tearfully admits that he wants to return to the Straw Hat Pirates but cannot abandon his family. Happy to hear Sanji's answer, Luffy decides to help him crash the wedding. Meanwhile, The third Sweet Commander, (Big Mom's second son) Katakuri arrives at the Whole Cake Chateau.
| 826 | 44 | "Sanji Comes Back! Crash! The Tea Party from Hell!"; Transliteration: "Sanji Fukkatsu - Kowase! Jigoku no Ochakai" (Japanese: サンジ復活 壊せ！地獄のお茶会) | Katsumi Tokoro | Tomohiro Nakayama | February 18, 2018 | TBA |
After Luffy and Sanji reconcile, the Sanji Retrieval Team manages to contact them through a mirror shard. Jimbei proceeds to talk about Bege's past before revealing that he plots to assassinate Big Mom during the tea party only to then propose forming an alliance with him. Meanwhile, Big Mom's third, Daifuku arrives at the Whole Cake Chateau.
| 827 | 45 | "A Secret Meeting! Luffy vs. the Fire Tank Pirates!"; Transliteration: "Mikkai! Rufi tai Faia Tanku Kaizoku-dan" (Japanese: 密会！ルフィVS(たい)ファイアタンク海賊団) | Yoshihiro Ueda | Kisa Miura | March 4, 2018 | TBA |
The Sanji Retrieval Team goes to the Fire Tank Pirates' hideout to meet Capone Bege. Meanwhile, the Sun Pirates tend to an injured Pekoms and guard him to prevent him from reporting to Big Mom. While Nami and Carrot are bathing, they have a conversation with Charlotte Chiffon, who explains Lola's arranged marriage with Loki, the prince of Elbaf, and how Lola running away from it cost Big Mom an alliance with the giants, which resulted in Big Mom abusing Chiffon due do her resemblance to Lola, which is why Chiffon feels nothing towards Bege's plan to assassinate her mother. After finishing bathing and changing clothes, the Sanji Retrieval Team meets Bege in person, while at the Whole Cake Chateau, Big Mom's fourth son Oven arrives.
| 828 | 46 | "The Deadly Pact! Luffy & Bege's Allied Forces!"; Transliteration: "Shi no Kyōtei - Rufi ando Bejji Rengō-gun!" (Japanese: 死の協定 ルフィ&ベッジ連合軍！) | Masahiro Hosoda | Jin Tanaka | March 18, 2018 | TBA |
The meeting between the Sanji Retrieval Team and the Fire Tank Pirates begins. Luffy wants to punch Bege for what he did to Pekoms and after a brief quarrel, Jimbei convinces everyone to put their differences aside. Bege reveals that he recruited Caesar for his assassination plot and goes over his plan to kill Big Mom. Bege then explains an incident concerning a photo of Mother Carmel, and convinces Luffy to be the bait.
| 829 | 47 | "Luffy Engages in a Secret Maneuver! The Wedding Full of Conspiracies Starts Soon!"; Transliteration: "Rufi An'yaku - Kaien Chokuzen! Inbō no Kekkonshiki" (Japanese: ルフィ暗躍 開演直前！陰謀の結婚式) | Yasunori Koyama | Shōji Yonemura | March 25, 2018 | TBA |
The meeting between the Sanji Retrieval Team and the Fire Tank Pirates continues. The groups review their plans for the Tea Party and intend to use a mirror and Brûlée to escape. After the meeting concludes, Sanji returns to his room to prepare for the wedding. Meanwhile, the Sun Pirates prepare to leave Whole Cake Island after tying Pekoms to a rock. The guests arrive and everyone prepares for the tea party, which is due in an hour.
| 830 | 48 | "The Family Gets Together! The Hellish Tea Party Starts!"; Transliteration: "Famirī Shūketsu - Kaien! Jigoku no Ochakai" (Japanese: 家族(ファミリー)集結 開宴！地獄のお茶会) | Aya Komaki | Tomohiro Nakayama | April 1, 2018 | TBA |
The Underworld emperors arrive at the Whole Cake Chateau to attend Big Mom's tea party. Bege and his crew act as security for the wedding. When the Vinsmoke family arrives, they are asked to relinquish their weapons and raid suits. As the Sanji Retrieval Team prepares for Bege's operation, Luffy goes to the Seducing Woods to catch animals. At the venue, an angry guest Jigra tries to force his way in only to be shot down by Sweet Commander Charlotte Katakuri, whose advance Observation Haki allows him to briefly see into the future, has a bounty over a billion. Shortly afterwards, the Organ Trading Assassin Group attack the venue but they are easily defeated by Daifuku and Oven. After all the guests arrive at the venue, Big Mom appears and the tea party begins.
| 831 | 49 | "The Broken Couple! Sanji and Pudding Enter!"; Transliteration: "Kamen Fūfu - Sanji ♡ Purin Nyūjō!" (Japanese: 仮面夫婦 サンジ♡プリン入場！) | Yusuke Suzuki | Kisa Miura | April 8, 2018 | TBA |
As the Tea Party begins, the Fire Tank Pirates and Caesar Clown make preparations to commit their assassination attempt on Big Mom. Inside the venue, Big Mom receives the portrait of Mother Carmel as well as presents from her guests, and she reveals that she will be opening the Tamate Box after the wedding. Meanwhile, Sanji struggles to not be fooled by Pudding's facade as the two of them practise their vows before being flown out to the venue.
| 832 | 50 | "A Deadly Kiss! The Mission to Assassinate the Emperor Kicks Off!"; Transliteration: "Shi no Kisu - Yonkō Ansatsu Sakusen Kaishi!" (Japanese: 死のキス 四皇暗殺作戦開始！) | Yoshihiro Ueda | Jin Tanaka | April 15, 2018 | TBA |
The wedding begins and after Sanji and Pudding arrive at the venue, Streusen brings out the wedding cake with the altar at the top. After arriving at the altar, Sanji and Pudding begin exchanging vows. Following Big Mom's plan, Pudding reveals her third eye to Sanji who says that it is beautiful, something that no one else has said to her before. Pudding breaks down in tears, causing Big Mom's plan to go awry. Katakuri tries to assassinate Sanji himself but fails. Afterwards, Luffy and his duplicates intrude into the venue by bursting out of the wedding cake.
| 833 | 51 | "Returning the Sake Cup! The Manly Jimbei Pays His Debt!"; Transliteration: "Sakazuki Henjō! Otoko Jinbē no Otoshimae" (Japanese: 盃返上！侠客(おとこ)ジンベエの落とし前) | Hiroyuki Satō | Tomohiro Nakayama | April 22, 2018 | TBA |
Luffy's duplicates run amok at the wedding venue as the cake collapses. Following Bege's plan, Luffy goes after Carmel's photo. However, his attempt is thwarted by Katakuri using his Mochi Mochi Fruit ability. Jimbei steps in and saves Luffy from Katakuri's clutches and explains the latter ate the Mochi-Mochi Fruit. He then confronts Big Mom and declares his intention to leave her crew and join the Straw Hats. Big Mom then attempts to take Jimbei's lifespan, but his lack of fear towards her causes her powers to have no effect. As Big Mom attacks Jimbei in a fit of rage, Brook (disguised as Luffy) destroys the photo of Carmel.
| 834 | 52 | "The Mission Failed?! The Big Mom Pirates Strike Back!"; Transliteration: "Sakusen Shippai!? Hangeki no Biggu Mamu Kaizoku-dan" (Japanese: 作戦失敗!? 反撃のビッグ・マム海賊団) | Satoshi Itō | Shōji Yonemura | April 29, 2018 | TBA |
Even though Big Mom has a mental crisis, she does not start screaming as Bege had planned. Luffy and Jimbei defend themselves against the attacking Big Mom Pirates. Pudding attempts to shoot Sanji but fails, prompting Daifuku to attack him with his genie created by his Puff-Puff Fruit power, while Oven's Heat-Heat Fruit power holds off Pedro. As Bege's plan goes awry, Perospero traps the Vinsmokes in candy and they are held at gunpoint. Brook notices that Big Mom is not screaming because she is confused on what to be angry about. He then tells Luffy to show her the broken picture again, which Luffy prepares to do.
| 835 | 53 | "Run, Sanji - SOS! Germa 66!"; Transliteration: "Hashire Sanji - Esu-Ō-Esu! Jeruma Daburu Shikkusu" (Japanese: 走れサンジ SOS！ジェルマ66(ダブルシックス)) | Katsumi Tokoro | Kisa Miura | May 6, 2018 | TBA |
Knowing what he needs to do, Luffy takes the fragments of Carmel's picture and runs towards Big Mom. With his family in a dire situation, Sanji runs towards them but is stopped by Daifuku's genie. Despite Katakuri's attempt to stop Luffy, the latter manages to show Carmel's broken picture to Big Mom. She starts screaming and incapacitates her family and crew, allowing Sanji to free his family. With Big Mom vulnerable, Bege, Vito, and Gotti prepare to assassinate her.
| 836 | 54 | "Mom's Secret! The Giant's Island Elbaph and a Little Monster!"; Transliteration: "Mamu no Himitsu - Erubafu to Chīsana Kaibutsu" (Japanese: マムの秘密 巨人の島(エルバフ)と小さな怪物) | Yutaka Nakashima | Atsuhiro Tomioka | May 13, 2018 | TBA |
A flashback begins, showing 63 years ago when Linlin was five years old. Her parents left her at Elbaf and she met Carmel, a woman who saved some of the Giant Warrior Pirates from execution after Dory and Brogy began their duel on Little Garden. Carmel ran an orphanage called the Sheep's House and she took Linlin in. The Elbaf village prepares for the Winter Solstice Festival. The villagers led by There, the two former captains of the Giant Warrior Pirates, Jarul and Jorul and the Sheep's House children feast on semla prior to the twelve-day fast. On the seventh day of the fast, Linlin lost control and goes on a rampage for semla.
| 837 | 55 | "The Birth of Mom! The Day That Carmel Vanished!"; Transliteration: "Mamu Tanjō - Karumeru ga Kieta Hi" (Japanese: マム誕生 カルメルが消えた日) | Masahiro Hosoda | Jin Tanaka | May 20, 2018 | TBA |
Furious at Linlin's actions, Jorul tried to strike down Linlin, only to be mortally wounded by the rampaging child. Linlin's rampage finally stopped when the giants gave her the semla. Jarul prepared to avenge Jorul, but Carmel begged him to spare Linlin, saying that she would leave Elbaf with her. Jorul died and this incident earned Linlin the hatred of the giants. Carmel and the children of the Sheep's House moved to a different island. Carmel, whose actually a child trafficker, had a secret meeting with Cipher Pol, negotiating on selling Linlin to the World Government. The Sheep's House children later celebrated Linlin's sixth birthday. After feasting on some sweets, Linlin discovered that Carmel and the other orphans disappeared.
| 838 | 56 | "The Launcher Blasts! The Moment of Big Mom's Assassination!"; Transliteration: "Ranchā Sakuretsu! Biggu Mamu Ansatsu no Toki" (Japanese: 兵器(ランチャー)炸裂！ビッグ・マム暗殺の瞬(と)間(き)) | Yoshihiro Ueda | Tomohiro Nakayama | May 27, 2018 | TBA |
Linlin cried from Carmel's disappearance, and two people witnessed what really happened. One of the witnesses was an Elbaf giant, who quickly fled back to Elbaf to tell the other giants what he saw. The other witness was Streusen, who decided to take advantage of Linlin's potential. Streusen befriended Linlin using his Cook-Cook Fruit power to feed her and they began creating Linlin's ideal country. In the present, Bege, Vito, and Gotti fire their KX Launchers. However, their assassination attempt ends in failure as Big Mom's scream destroys the rockets before they could reach her. Caesar Clown brings in the escape mirror, but it is shattered by Big Mom's scream. Katakuri creates earplugs for his family and crew and the Big Mom Pirates proceed to surround the alliance.
| 839 | 57 | "The Evil Army - Transform! Germa 66!"; Transliteration: "Aku no Gundan - Henshin! Jeruma Daburu Shikkusu" (Japanese: 悪の軍団 変身！ジェルマ66(ダブルシックス)) | Aya Komaki | Shōji Yonemura | June 3, 2018 | TBA |
With nowhere else to run, Bege transforms into a fortress known as Big Father. The alliance quickly tries to retreat into the fortress, but are held up by the Big Mom Pirates, who rescue Brûlée from their grasp. However, the Vinsmoke Family puts on their Raid Suits and repelled the Big Mom Pirates, allowing their new allies to retreat. Bege then tries to attack Big Mom, only to be stopped by Perospero and Katakuri as the Big Mom Pirates besiege him. Meanwhile, Underworld emperor Du Feld attempts to steal the contents of the Tamatebako, but Big Mom's scream ends up blowing the chest off of the Chateau's roof.
| 840 | 58 | "Cutting the Father-Son Relationship! Sanji and Judge!"; Transliteration: "Oyako no Ketsubetsu - Sanji to Jajji" (Japanese: 父子(おやこ)の訣別 サンジとジャッジ) | Yutaka Nakashima | Atsuhiro Tomioka | June 10, 2018 | TBA |
The alliance and the Vinsmoke Family take shelter inside Bege's fortress. However, Big Mom regains her senses and begins attacking the fortress. Bege comes up with a plan to escape. He will return to human form with the alliance still inside him and have Caesar fly him out of the venue. Judge then asks Sanji why he saved his family. Sanji replies that he did it to honor Zeff before disowning Judge. After promising to never interfere in Sanji's life nor go near East Blue again, Judge volunteers to help the alliance escape. As Bege deactivates his Big Father form, the Vinsmokes face the Big Mom Pirates in battle.
| 841 | 59 | "Escape From the Tea Party! Luffy vs. Big Mom!"; Transliteration: "Chakai Dasshutsu! Rufi tai Biggu Mamu" (Japanese: 茶会脱出！ルフィVS(たい)ビッグ・マム) | Kōhei Kureta | Kisa Miura | June 17, 2018 | TBA |
As Caesar carries Bege out of the venue, the Vinsmoke Family covers for them. During the scuffle, Big Mom knocks down Reiju, prompting Luffy and Sanji to leave Bege's body to defend her as Ichiji, Niji, and Yonji repel any Big Mom Pirate who goes after Caesar. When Du Feld tries to reclaim the Tamatebako, he's struck down by fellow Underwold emperor, Stussy, whose actually a CP-"Aigis" 0 agent looking to claim the Tamatebako for the World Government. She makes sure that Morgans, the bird-man president of the World Economy News Paper who is spying on this exchange, will blame the theft on Feld in his newspaper in exchange for getting to see its contents. Unfortunately, Du Feld's body pushes the Tamatebako off the roof. Luffy briefly clashes with Big Mom before retreating. As Big Mom starts chasing Luffy's group, Judge battles Big Mom but is quickly defeated.
| 842 | 60 | "The Execution Begins! Luffy's Allied Forces Are Annihilated?!"; Transliteration: "Shokei Kaishi - Rufi Rengō-gun Zenmetsu!?" (Japanese: 処刑開始 ルフィ連合軍全滅!?) | Yusuke Suzuki | Jin Tanaka | June 24, 2018 | TBA |
After Judge is subdued, Niji and Yonji clash with Big Mom. Caesar Clown continues carrying Bege out of the venue but Katakuri stands in his way. Ichiji helps the alliance by battling the Sweet Commander, but Caesar is stopped by Brûlée. The alliance then finds themselves in a dire situation as Luffy, Sanji, and the Vinsmoke Family are overwhelmed. However, the Tamatebako drops to the bottom of the chateau and explodes, causing the castle to start collapsing.
| 843 | 61 | "The Chateau Collapses! The Straw Hat's Great Escape Begins!"; Transliteration: "Shatō Hōkai - Mugiwara Ichimi Dai Dassō Sutāto!" (Japanese: 巨城(シャトー)崩壞 麦わら一味大脱走開始(スタート)！) | Takahiro Imamura | Tomohiro Nakayama | July 1, 2018 | TBA |
As the chateau collapses, the Straw Hats, the Fire Tank Pirates, and the Vinsmoke Family escape from the Big Mom Pirates' clutches. Streusen saves the falling Big Mom Pirates by turning the collapsing castle into cake. After getting away from the chateau, Bege returns Caesar's heart to him and ends his alliance with the Straw Hats. As Bege and his crew flee, the Straw Hats head back to the Thousand Sunny while Brook and Chopper go retrieve the Shark Submerge III. The Big Mom Pirates organize to pursue their enemies, but Big Mom suffers a craving for wedding cake and goes on a rampage.
| 844 | 62 | "The Spear of Elbaph - Onslaught! The Flying Big Mom!"; Transliteration: "Erubafu no Yari - Kyōshū! Sora Kakeru Biggu Mamu" (Japanese: 巨人(エルバフ)の槍 強襲！空翔るビッグ・マム) | Satoshi Itō | Shōji Yonemura | July 8, 2018 | TBA |
As a crazed Big Mom is causing destruction at Sweet City, Perospero tells her that the Straw Hats had a spare wedding cake in an attempt to stop her from damaging the city any further. After Big Mom leaves to pursue the Straw Hats, Pudding explains her plan to satisfy Big Mom's craving. Meanwhile at the Germa Kingdom, the Vinsmoke Family fights and defeats Nusstorte and his squad. As they run towards the Seducing Woods, the Straw Hats encounter King Baum, who has been revived and stitched back together, and use him to carry them back to the Thousand Sunny. However, they soon find a squad of pursuers and Big Mom right behind them.
| 845 | 63 | "Pudding's Determination - Ablaze! The Seducing Woods!"; Transliteration: "Purin no Ketsui - Dai Enjō! Yūwaku no Mori" (Japanese: プリンの決意 大炎上！誘惑の森) | Yoshihiro Ueda | Atsuhiro Tomioka | July 15, 2018 | TBA |
As Big Mom unleashes devastating attacks, the Sanji Retrieval Team urges King Baum to keep going as they head into the Seducing Woods. Nami manages to win Zeus to her side by feeding it thunderclouds, but Prometheus sets King Baum ablaze and the Big Mom Pirates lie in wait to ambush their enemies from every possible location. Meanwhile, Pudding catches up to Bege elsewhere and asks Chiffon for help, saying that she wants to stop Big Mom to save Sanji and his friends.
| 846 | 64 | "A Lightning Counterattack! Nami and Zeus the Thundercloud!"; Transliteration: "Hangeki no Ikazuchi - Nami to Raiun Zeusu!" (Japanese: 反撃の雷 ナミと雷雲ゼウス！) | Yutaka Nakashima | Jin Tanaka | July 22, 2018 | TBA |
Chopper and Brook reach the Shark Submerge and return to the Thousand Sunny. At the Seducing Woods, Luffy's group continue fleeing from Big Mom on foot. As the tree homies shift the landscape, the Straw Hats clash with a pursuit squad and defeat them. With Big Mom closing in on them, Nami feeds Zeus several Black Balls and a Weather Egg to use him to bring a huge thunderbolt down on her.
| 847 | 65 | "A Coincidental Reunion! Sanji and the Lovestruck Evil Pudding!"; Transliteration: "Gūzen no Saikai - Sanji to Koisuru Waru Purin" (Japanese: 偶然の再会 サンジと恋する悪プリン) | Masahiro Hosoda | Kisa Miura | July 29, 2018 | TBA |
Chopper and Brook return to the Sunny to find the ship occupied by the Big Mom Pirates. To regain the ship, the two begin battling the enemy crew, which Perospero believes is pointless as he thinks Nami's massive thunderbolt was Big Mom finishing off their friends. Chiffon agrees to go with Pudding to help save the Straw Hats and part ways with Bege. Big Mom withstood Nami's attack and continues her pursuit. Pudding and Chiffon arrive at the Seducing Woods to recruit Sanji and he goes with them.
| 848 | 66 | "Save the Sunny - Fighting Bravely! Chopper & Brook!"; Transliteration: "Sanī o Mamore - Funsen! Choppā ando Burukku" (Japanese: サニーを守れ 奮戦！チョッパー&ブルック) | Hiroyuki Satō | Tomohiro Nakayama | August 5, 2018 | TBA |
After Sanji successfully got on Rabiyan, Pudding helps Luffy's group by preventing the tree homies from hindering them any longer. Sanji, Pudding, and Chiffon then leave Whole Cake Island and head for Cacao Island. Chopper and Brook continue fighting the Big Mom Pirates on the Thousand Sunny. Perospero steps in and subdues them, trapping them in candy. Shortly afterwards, Luffy's group reaches the coast.
| 849 | 67 | "Before the Dawn! Pedro, Captain of the Guardians!"; Transliteration: "Yoake Mae - Gādianzu Danchō Pedoro" (Japanese: 夜明け前 侠客団(ガーディアンズ)団長ペドロ) | Katsumi Tokoro | Shōji Yonemura | August 12, 2018 | TBA |
Luffy's group made it back to the Thousand Sunny. As Luffy battles Katakuri, whose appears to be immune to Armament Haki, the rest prepares the ship for escape. Perospero returns to the shore and traps the Sunny in candy, prompting Pedro to fight him. After Pedro is overpowered, he detonates sticks of dynamite strapped on him in hopes of taking down Perospero in a suicidal explosion.
| 850 | 68 | "I'll Be Back! Luffy, Deadly Departure!"; Transliteration: "Kanarazu Modoru - Rufi Inochigake no Shukkō!" (Japanese: 必ず戻る ルフィ命がけの出航！) | Ryota Nakamura | Atsuhiro Tomioka | August 19, 2018 | TBA |
Thanks to Pedro's explosion, Chopper, Brook, and the Thousand Sunny are freed from the candy entrapment. Angered at Pedro's self-sacrifice, Carrot attacks Katakuri only to be overpowered. Luffy clashes with the Sweet Commander and manages to grab him. Perospero is shown to have survived the explosion, but lost his right arm. As Big Mom and the Tarteships attack the Sunny, the Straw Hats manage to get away with Coup de Burst. Meanwhile, Luffy dragged Katakuri into the Mirro-World to battle him.
| 851 | 69 | "The Man with a Bounty of Billion! The Strongest Sweet General, Katakuri!"; Transliteration: "Jū-oku no Otoko - Saikyō no San Shōsei Katakuri" (Japanese: 10億の男 最強の3将星カタクリ) | Kōhei Kureta | Jin Tanaka | August 26, 2018 | TBA |
In the Mirro-World, Luffy begins a fierce clash with Katakuri. After leaving from Whole Cake Island, the group on the Thousand Sunny mourns Pedro's self-sacrifice until Jinbe tells them to remain focused on escaping Totto Land. They are soon pursued by Big Mom and a small fleet. Meanwhile, Sanji, Pudding, and Chiffon approach Cacao Island.
| 852 | 70 | "A Hard Battle Starts! Luffy vs. Katakuri!"; Transliteration: "Gekitō Kaimaku - Rufi tai Katakuri" (Japanese: 激闘開幕 ルフィVS(たい)カタクリ) | Aya Komaki | Shōji Yonemura | September 2, 2018 | TBA |
Sanji, Pudding, and Chiffon arrive at Cacao Island and begin making a new wedding cake with the assistance of the WCI 31, Totto Land's top chefs. In the Mirro-World, Katakuri continues to have the advantage over Luffy. With Brûlée awake again, the Big Mom Pirates prepare to attack the Thousand Sunny.
| 853 | 71 | "The Green Room! An Invincible Helmsman, Jimbei!"; Transliteration: "Gurīn Rūmu - Muteki no Sōdashu Jinbē" (Japanese: 波の部屋(グリーンルーム) 無敵の操舵手ジンベエ) | Yoshihiro Ueda | Kisa Miura | September 16, 2018 | TBA |
Mascarpone and Joscarpone aim and shoot fire arrows through a mirrors to the Sunny from the Mirro-World. Luffy orders his crewmates on the Sunny to break all the mirrors to prevent further assault as he is overwhelmed by Katakuri. Meanwhile, Luffy´s crew face a huge wave with Big Mom and Perospero on it. Fortunately, Jimbei's incredible skills as a helmsman saves them.
| 854 | 72 | "The Threat of the Mole! Luffy's Silent Fight!"; Transliteration: "Mogura no Kyōi - Rufi Chinmoku no Tatakai!" (Japanese: 土竜(モグラ)の脅威 ルフィ沈黙の戦い！) | Satoshi Itō | Tomohiro Nakayama | September 23, 2018 | TBA |
The Sunny crew shatters all of the mirrors on the ship, and they make plans with Luffy to reunite at Cacao Island at 1:00 AM. However, Brûlée overhears this conversation and discovers that the other Straw Hats are alive. She reports this to Perospero, but to his horror, Big Mom decides to go to Nuts Island instead. Meanwhile, the Big Mom Pirates have invaded the Germa Kingdom. Back in the Mirro-World, Katakuri brings out his trident Mogura to attack Luffy. Luffy struggles to avoid its devastating attacks, and Katakuri continues to have the advantage as Luffy cannot hit him.
| 855 | 73 | "The End of the Deadly Battle?! Katakuri's Awakening in Anger!"; Transliteration: "Shitō Ketchaku!? Katakuri Ikari no Kakusei" (Japanese: 死闘決着!? カタクリ怒りの覚醒) | Directed by : Yusuke Suzuki; Storyboarded by : Yutaka Nakashima | Atsuhiro Tomioka | September 30, 2018 | TBA |
On Whole Cake Island, Count Niwatori cautions Mont-d'Or about the potential of the Straw Hats. Capone Bege and the Fire Tank Pirates escape from Charlotte Custard's pursuit, and although they are pushed at first, Germa 66 decisively beats the forces sent to invade the Germa Kingdom. In the Mirro-World, despite not being able to touch him, Luffy is able to tire Katakuri by dodging his strikes. Luffy attempts to activate Gear Fourth, but Katakuri uses his awakened abilities to stop him. The Sweet Commander decides to end the battle because he is late for his merienda, and buries Luffy in a deep pile of mochi.
| 856 | 74 | "The Forbidden Secret! Katakuri's Merienda!"; Transliteration: "Kindan no Himitsu - Katakuri no Merienda" (Japanese: 禁断の秘密 カタクリのおやつの時間(メリエンダ)) | Toshinori Fukuzawa | Jin Tanaka | October 7, 2018 | TBA |
After burying Luffy under a mountain of mochi, Katakuri believes he won and calls his chefs, who bring snacks for him to feast on. Katakuri makes a shrine where he can eat in private. Luffy breaks out of the mochi he was buried under and shattered the shrine, exposing Katakuri's face. Katakuri then executes the chefs before resuming his attempts to kill Luffy. After managing to land a hit on Katakuri, Luffy says that he figures out how to beat him and activates Gear Fourth: Bounceman.
| 857 | 75 | "Luffy Fights Back! The Invincible Katakuri's Weak Point!"; Transliteration: "Rufi Hangeki - Muteki Katakuri no Jakuten!" (Japanese: ルフィ反撃 無敵カタクリの弱点！) | Yasunori Koyama | Shōji Yonemura | October 14, 2018 | TBA |
After activating Gear Fourth: Bounceman, Luffy manages to deal some damage to Katakuri, having realised the latter has been using his advance Observation Haki to avoid Luffy's attack while making it appear that he was immune to Armament Haki. However, Luffy loses the upper hand when Katakuri regains his composure. Back at Cacao Island, Pound arrives at the Sweets Factory, wanting to see Chiffon, but when Oven arrives, he attacks Pound. Inside the factory, Brûlée speaks to Pudding through a Transponder Snail and informs her of the Straw Hats' plan to arrive at Cacao Island.
| 858 | 76 | "Another Crisis! Fourth Gear vs. Unstoppable Donuts!"; Transliteration: "Pinchi Futatabi! Gia Fōsu tai Musō Dōnatsu" (Japanese: 危機(ピンチ)再び！ギア4(フォース)VS(たい)無双ドーナツ) | Takahiro Imamura | Kisa Miura | October 21, 2018 | TBA |
With Luffy losing the advantage, Katakuri goes back on the offensive. Luffy retreats when he realizes his Gear Fourth is about to wear off. After his Gear Fourth wears off, Luffy flees and encounters Brûlée, whom he uses to escape the Mirro-World. They arrive at Nuts Island, where Big Mom is going on a rampage. Thanks to Praline, the Big Mom Pirates lose the Territorial Sea Slugs and the means to track their enemies. Nevertheless, the Big Mom Pirates assemble their fleet to hunt their enemies down. At Cacao Island, Sanji completes his special ingredient, Pudding finishes with the chocolate, and Chiffon finishes baking the cake. The chefs then plan to complete the cake while on the way to the Thousand Sunny.
| 859 | 77 | "The Rebellious Daughter, Chiffon! Sanji's Big Plan for Transporting the Cake!"; Transliteration: "Hangyaku no Shifon - Sanji no Kēki Yusō Dai Sakusen" (Japanese: 反逆の娘(シフォン) サンジのケーキ輸送大作戦) | Directed by : Yusuke Suzuki; Storyboarded by : Masahiro Hosoda | Tomohiro Nakayama | October 28, 2018 | TBA |
The chefs at Cacao Island leave the Sweets Factory with the unfinished cake with plans to complete it while out at sea. However, they were approached by Oven, who intends to punish Chiffon. Meanwhile, the Fire Tank Pirates are on their way to the island. Back at Nuts Island, Luffy tries to find a mirror while fleeing from Big Mom.
| 860 | 78 | "A Man's Way of Life! Bege and Luffy's Determination as Captains!"; Transliteration: "Otoko no Ikizama - Bejji to Rufi Senchō no Ketsui" (Japanese: 男の生き様 ベッジとルフィ船長の決意) | Aya Komaki | Atsuhiro Tomioka | November 4, 2018 | TBA |
Oven tells Bege to stand down as he holds Chiffon hostage on Cacao Island, but Bege responds by shooting him. He reveals that the Nostra Castello can move on land as well, and takes the Big Mom Pirates by storm as the ship rumbles down the island toward Chiffon's group. Sanji then lifts up the cart carrying the cake, intending to place it on the ship. Meanwhile, the Sunny is pursued by the Big Mom Pirates, and Carrot asks if there is a full moon tonight. Luffy manages to escape from Nuts Island and Big Mom and after hopping to various islands through the Mirro-World, he thinks about how to beat Katakuri. Remembering his teaching that Haki grows stronger when one faces strong opponents, he decides to improve his own Haki by fighting Katakuri.
| 861 | 79 | "The Cake Sank?! Sanji & Bege's Getaway Battle!"; Transliteration: "Kēki Chinbotsu!? Sanji ando Bejji Tōbō-sen" (Japanese: ケーキ沈没!? サンジ&ベッジ逃亡戦) | Katsumi Tokoro | Jin Tanaka | November 11, 2018 | TBA |
Sanji gets the wedding cake on the Nostra Castello, which runs over Oven as the Fire Tank Pirates and Sanji's group escape out to sea. However, Oven attacks the ship by boiling the ocean, but Pound intervenes and attacks him. Pound sees Chiffon and Pez, and he is glad to see his daughter and grandson being happy. He congratulates Chiffon on her marriage right as Oven takes him out with a naginata. Meanwhile, Luffy returns to the Mirro-World after regaining his Haki and resumes his fight with Katakuri. Out at sea, the Sunny crew becomes surrounded by Big Mom and her fleet.
| 862 | 80 | "Sulong! Carrot's Big Mystic Transformation!"; Transliteration: "Sūron - Kyarotto Shinpi no Dai Henshin" (Japanese: 月の獅子(スーロン) キャロット神秘の大変身) | Hiroyuki Satō | Shōji Yonemura | November 18, 2018 | TBA |
Luffy and Katakuri resume their battle in the Mirro-World, with Luffy intending to use the battle to strengthen his Haki and defeat Katakuri. Meanwhile, the Sunny crew is surrounded by the Big Mom Pirates' fleet, and is headed right for Daifuku's fleet. However, Carrot offers to help the crew by using the full moon to activate Sulong, increasing her battle prowess and allowing her to overwhelm Daifuku and his crew.
| 863 | 81 | "Break Through! The Straw Hat's Mighty Sea Battle!"; Transliteration: "Toppa Seyo - Mugiwara no Ichimi Dai Kaisen!" (Japanese: 突破せよ 麦わらの一味大海戦！) | Yoshihiro Ueda | Kisa Miura | November 25, 2018 | TBA |
Luffy continues focusing during his fight with Katakuri in order to improve his Haki. Meanwhile, Perospero is horrified to learn that the wedding cake is on Bege's ship, but on that ship, Sanji forbids Bege from poisoning the cake. Carrot decimates Daifuku's fleet, clearing the way for the Sunny crew to outpace the Big Mom Pirates' fleet, and Brook brings her back to the Sunny. However, Big Mom then summons Zeus and Prometheus to her side as, with them and Napoleon, she leaps onto the Sunny to look for the cake.
| 864 | 82 | "Finally, They Clash! The Emperor of the Sea vs. Straw Hats!"; Transliteration: "Tsui ni Gekitotsu - Yonkō tai Mugiwara no Ichimi" (Japanese: 遂に激突 四皇VS(たい)麦わらの一味) | Yutaka Nakashima | Tomohiro Nakayama | December 9, 2018 | TBA |
As Katakuri continues his onslaught, Luffy struggles to raise the level of his Kenbunshoku Haki. After Big Mom boards the Thousand Sunny, the situation for the Straw Hats becomes more dire until Jimbei drives her off the ship. Big Mom continues with her attack and the Straw Hats work together to defend the ship.
| 865 | 83 | "Dark King's Direct Precepts! The Battle Against Katakuri Turns Around!"; Transliteration: "Meiō Jikiden - Katakuri-sen Dai Gyakuten Kaishi" (Japanese: 冥王直伝 カタクリ戦大逆転開始) | Yusuke Suzuki & Yasunori Koyama | Jin Tanaka | December 16, 2018 | TBA |
Luffy and Katakuri's clash continues. Flampe watches the battle and plans to win Katakuri's favor. Remembering Rayleigh's training, Luffy is beginning to see into the future. Back at the Totto Land sea, the Straw Hats manage to capture Zeus, but Big Mom continues pursuing the Thousand Sunny by riding on Prometheus.
| 866 | 84 | "Finally He Returns! Sanji, the Man Who'll Stop the Emperor of the Sea!"; Transliteration: "Tsui ni Kikan - Yonkō o Tomeru Otoko Sanji" (Japanese: 遂に帰還 四皇を止める男サンジ) | Yoshihiro Ueda | Shōji Yonemura | December 23, 2018 | TBA |
Luffy continues to fight with Katakuri. Despite his injuries, he is determined to defeat his enemy and return to the Thousand Sunny. Back at the Sunny, the Straw Hat Pirates still flee from Big Mom, who uses her soul to enlarge Prometheus. Nami then sees the Nostra Castello with the wedding cake on board. Big Mom, lured by the scent, starts to pursue Capone Bege. Sanji returns to the Sunny and the Straw Hats continue their course for Cacao Island.
| 867 | 85 | "Lurking in the Darkness! An Assassin Targeting Luffy!"; Transliteration: "Yami ni Hisomu - Rufi o Osou Ansatsusha!" (Japanese: 闇に潜む ルフィを襲う暗殺者！) | Masahiro Hosoda | Kisa Miura | January 6, 2019 | TBA |
With Big Mom following the Fire Tank Pirates, the group on the Thousand Sunny continues on to Cacao Island, but Sanji informs them that the Big Mom Pirates are aware of their plan to meet Luffy there. At Cacao Island, a large force of the Big Mom Pirates gathers and Oven prepares a trap for Luffy. Inside the Mirro-World, Flampe quietly interferes with Luffy's fight with Katakuri, causing Luffy to suffer a severe injury.
| 868 | 86 | "One Man's Determination! Katakuri's Deadly Big Fight!"; Transliteration: "Otoko no Kakugo - Katakuri Inochigake Ōshōbu" (Japanese: 男の覚悟 カタクリ命がけ大勝負) | Aya Komaki | Tomohiro Nakayama | January 13, 2019 | TBA |
After discovering Flampe's presence in the Mirro-World, Katakuri finds her and confronts her for intruding in his fight. He stabs himself to make up for the injury she helped him deal to Luffy, and confronts Luffy again. The two of them use Haoshoku Haki to knock out Flampe's group before resuming their fight as equals. Meanwhile, Chiffon tells Bege to bring the cake to Funwari Island to keep Big Mom far enough away from the Straw Hats. As Sanji and Pudding head off for Cacao Island, the rest of the Sunny crew finds themselves under attack from Smoothie.
| 869 | 87 | "Wake Up! The Power of Observation Able to Top the Strongest!"; Transliteration: "Mezamero - Saikyō o Koeru Kenbun-shoku!" (Japanese: 目覚めろ 最強を越える見聞色！) | Katsumi Tokoro | Jin Tanaka | January 20, 2019 | TBA |
Sanji and Pudding prepare to infiltrate Cacao Island, which Oven has stationed with thousands of his siblings and crewmates. In the Mirro-World, Luffy's Observation Haki has developed to the point where he is able to foresee Katakuri's attacks and trade blows with him. With an hour to go before his planned rendezvous with the crew, Luffy activates a form of Gear Fourth known as Snakeman.
| 870 | 88 | "A Fist of Divine Speed! Another Fourth Gear Application Activated!"; Transliteration: "Shinsoku no Ken - Aratanaru Gia Fōsu Hatsudō!" (Japanese: 神速の拳 新たなるギア4(フォース)発動！) | Kōhei Kureta | Shōji Yonemura | January 27, 2019 | TBA |
Luffy activates Fourth Gear: Snakeman, a sleeker, less armored form of Bounceman, allows him to rapidly change their direction of his punches and increases their speed the longer their thrown. Katakuri responds by transforming into mochi and avoids them as he rolls toward Luffy in a donut-like shape. Upon reaching Luffy, Katakuri transforms back into his human body as he enlarges one of his forarms while covering it flaming Armament Haki-imbued spikes, and he slams it into Luffy in a move called Buzz Cut Mochi. In addition to being injured, Luffy becomes stuck to the club, and Katakuri spins it around rapidly before slamming it into the ground, leaving Luffy at the bottom of a large crater. Sanji and Pudding make it to Cacao Island, and successfully sneak into Chocolat Town without anyone noticing. Back in the Mirro-World Luffy emerges from the crater, he and Katakuri engage in a massive duel leading to them preparing their final attacks. At the same time in Shakky's Rip-off Bar on the Sabaody Archipelago, Shakky wonders how Luffy was doing as she recalls Rayleigh once saying that only those who live in the present could shape a new era as Rayleigh reflects on his belief that Luffy will rise above any challenge. Back in the Mirror-World, Katakuri transforms into a mochi donut as he prepares to unleash the Buzz Cut Mochi again, while Luffy moves his arm around his body and enlarges his fist for the Gum-Gum King Cobra. Both attacks hit their mark, resulting in a tremendous clash that rumbles through the Mirro-World.
| 871 | 89 | "Finally, It's Over! The Climax of the Intense Fight Against Katakuri!"; Transliteration: "Tsuini Shūketsu - Sōzetsu Katakuri-sen no Yukue" (Japanese: 遂に終結 壮絶カタクリ戦の行方) | Yutaka Nakashima | Tomohiro Nakayama | February 3, 2019 | TBA |
With 1:00 AM drawing closer, Sanji and Pudding reminisce about their experiences together as Sanji prepares to depart. The Straw Hats approach Cacao Island, while the Fire Tank Pirates and the wedding cake approach Funwari Island with Big Mom on their tail. In the Mirro World, Luffy emerges victorious from his battle with Katakuri. Having foreseen Luffy's determination, Katakuri surrenders the fight lying on his back, with Luffy covering his mouth as a sign of respect. He finds that Brûlée has escaped, but Pekoms then shows up with a recaptured Brûlée, wanting to help Luffy escape to honor Pedro's memory.
| 872 | 90 | "A Desperate Situation! The Iron-Tight Entrapment of Luffy!"; Transliteration: "Zettai Zetsumei - Teppeki no Rufi Hōimō!" (Japanese: 絶体絶命 鉄壁のルフィ包囲網！) | Directed by : Yoshihiro Ueda; Storyboarded by : Takahiro Imamura | Jin Tanaka | February 10, 2019 | TBA |
The Sunny crew reaches Cacao Island, and in the Mirro-World, Pekoms tells Luffy he will activate his Sulong form to distract Oven's army. Upon reaching Cacao Island, Pekoms' distraction allows Luffy to run off, and Sanji joins his captain. Oven and his army eventually stop Pekoms' rampage, and Sanji and Luffy are surrounded. However, the Germa Kingdom then attacks Cacao Island, and Ichiji, Niji, Yonji, and Reiju arrive to help their brother and his captain.
| 873 | 91 | "Pulling Back from the Brink! The Formidable Reinforcements - Germa!"; Transliteration: "Kishi Kaisei - Saikyō no Engun Jeruma!" (Japanese: 起死回生 最強の援軍ジェルマ！) | Satoshi Itō | Shōji Yonemura | February 17, 2019 | TBA |
The Vinsmoke Family battles Oven's army on Cacao Island and seeing Sanji and Luffy off, and Brûlée reveals to her crewmates that Luffy defeated Katakuri. Despite the army's relentless effort to avenge Katakuri, Sanji and Luffy ultimately make it off the island and fly toward the waiting Sunny.
| 874 | 92 | "The Last Hope! The Sun Pirates Emerge!"; Transliteration: "Saigo no Toride - Taiyō no Kaizoku-dan Arawaru" (Japanese: 最後の砦 タイヨウの海賊団現る) | Yoshihiro Ueda | Tomohiro Nakayama | February 24, 2019 | TBA |
The Fire Tank Pirates drop the wedding cake off on Funwari Island, but the Nostra Castello is destroyed while the Big Mom Pirates anxiously await the results of Big Mom eating it. Meanwhile, Sanji and Luffy return to the Thousand Sunny. Judge has the Germa Kingdom fleet take on the pursuing Big Mom Pirates' fleet, but the Straw Hats are confronted by an even more massive fleet in front of them. However, the Sun Pirates arrive to support their former captain Jimbei until he and the Straw Hats make it out of Totto Land.
| 875 | 93 | "A Captivating Flavor! Sanji's Cake of Happiness!"; Transliteration: "Miwaku no Aji - Shiawase no Sanji no Kēki" (Japanese: 魅惑の味 幸せのサンジのケーキ) | Aya Komaki | Jin Tanaka | March 3, 2019 | TBA |
Big Mom eats Sanji's wedding cake, and is overwhelmed with sheer happiness as she enjoys it. The Big Mom Pirates and Totto Land citizens rejoice at the end of her craving rampage, but the battle at Cacao Island still rages. The Sun Pirates clear a path for the Straw Hats to escape, but Oven boils the sea and forces them to retreat. The Big Mom Pirates gain ground against Germa 66 on land who face the Charlotte Decuplets who merge into a giant, and at sea, the Queen Mama Chanter confronts the Straw Hats and attacks, leaving flaming wreckage in the Thousand Sunny's wake.
| 876 | 94 | "The Man of Humanity and Justice! Jimbei, a Desperate Massive Ocean Current"; Transliteration: "Jingi no Otoko - Jinbē Kesshi no Daikairyū" (Japanese: 仁義の漢 ジンベエ決死の大海流) | Masahiro Hosoda | Tomohiro Nakayama | March 17, 2019 | TBA |
The Straw Hats had managed to be saved from death when Wadatsumi switched the Thousand Sunny with the Sun Pirates' ship. The Big Mom Pirates figure out what happened and quickly expose the Sunny again, but the Sun Pirates rise again to confront them. The crew is soon overwhelmed, and Luffy gives Jimbei permission to return and help his former crewmates, telling him to meet them at the Land of Wano. Jimbei goes to the Sun Pirates, and they create a current enabling the Straw Hats to escape from the Big Mom Pirates' fleet and leave Totto Land, as does Morgans and Stussy by hot air balloon. Morgans then tells Stussy his belief that one of the Worst Generation will become the next King of the Pirates.
| 877 | 95 | "The Parting Time! Pudding's Last Wish!"; Transliteration: "Sekibetsu no Toki - Purin Saigo no "Onegai"" (Japanese: 惜別の時 プリン最後の〝お願い〟) | Toshinori Fukuzawa | Shōji Yonemura | March 24, 2019 | TBA |
Sanji finds out about Pedro's death as the Straw Hats successfully sail out of Totto Land, and as she overhears the news on Cacao Island, Pudding weeps while recalling her memories with Sanji. In the Mirro-World, Brûlée tends to Katakuri's wounds. She reveals that she knows he had laid on his back before, and built up his invulnerable image to protect his siblings after she was attacked as a child. Jimbei, the Sun Pirates, and Germa 66 prepare to retreat from Cacao Island, but they are stopped by the arrival of Big Mom. Meanwhile, Sanji returns to work cooking food for his crew, and as he does this, his mentor Zeff serves some rowdy pirates at Baratie.
Whole Cake Island Epilogue (Reverie / Levely)
| 878 | 96 | "The World Is Stunned! The Fifth Emperor of the Sea Emerges!"; Transliteration: "Sekai Kyōgaku - Dai Go no Umi no Kōtei Arawaru!" (Japanese: 世界驚愕 第五の海の皇帝現る！) | Yutaka Nakashima | Shōji Yonemura | March 31, 2019 | TBA |
At Foosha Village and an unnamed island in the New World, Makino and Shanks each remember Luffy's experiences with Shanks and the Red Hair Pirates 12 years ago as they read the newspaper story about Luffy's incursion into Totto Land. In the Ryugu Kingdom, Neptune and his family read the news as they prepare to head to the Reverie and decide to place Fish-Man Island under Luffy's protection. On the Thousand Sunny, Luffy discovers a Raid Suit canister secretly given to him and Sanji by Niji, but Sanji refuses to use it. Zeus is shown to now be living in Nami's Clima-Tact. Carrot then shows the crew the newspaper, where they find out that Luffy and Sanji's bounties have increased, with Sanji initially happy that his bounty is now slightly higher than Zoro's, but becomes dismayed that his bounty now contains his family name while Luffy is now considered the Fifth Emperor of the Sea.
| 879 | 97 | "To the Reverie! The Straw Hats' Sworn Allies Come Together!"; Transliteration: "Reverī e - Shūketsu! Mugiwara no Meiyū-tachi" (Japanese: 世界会議(レヴェリー)へ 集結！麦わらの盟友達) | Yoshihiro Ueda | Jin Tanaka | April 7, 2019 | TBA |
As the royals from Dressrosa and Prodence Kingdom sail to Mariejois for the Reverie, they are attacked by pirates, but are saved by Koby and Helmeppo. Koby becomes flustered when Rebecca shows him the newspaper article about Luffy and remembers his life-altering encounter with the Straw Hat. The Four Emperors find out that Luffy has also been declared an Emperor, and Shanks reacts positively while the other three react negatively. As the Straw Hats sail to Wano Country, they find out that Luffy's bounty has increased to 1.5 billion berries.
| 880 | 98 | "Sabo Goes into Action! All the Captains of the Revolutionary Army Appear!"; Transliteration: "Sabo Ugoku - Kakumei-gun Zen Guntaichō Tōjō!" (Japanese: サボ動く 革命軍全軍隊長登場！) | Hiroyuki Sato | Tomohiro Nakayama | April 14, 2019 | TBA |
While the royalty is away for the Reverie, the Peachbeard Pirates raid the Lulucia Kingdom, wanting to steal the country's Heavenly Tribute to the Celestial Dragon. However, the four commanders of the Revolutionary Army - okama giant Morley, Belo Betty, cat mink Lindbergh, and Karasu -arrive. Betty uses her Pump-Pump Fruitability to encourage the townspeople to fight back, when the pirates attempt to retaliate, Morley moves the ground like clay and pushing to block their shots while Lindbergh uses his steampunk-esque weapons to freeze some of the pirates guns as Karasu morphs into a murder of crows to steal the rest. The townspeople then overwhelm the pirates as they defeat Peachbeard and his crew. Meanwhile, Sabo, Monkey D. Dragon, and Koala reunite with Ivankov and Inazuma on Peachy Island as they wait for the commanders to arrive. Once they arrive, they will discuss their plan to officially declare war on the World Nobles during the Reverie.
| 881 | 99 | "Going into Action! The Implacable New Admiral of the Fleet - Sakazuki!"; Transliteration: "Ugokidasu - Shūnen no Shin Gensui Sakazuki" (Japanese: 動き出す 執念の新元帥サカズキ) | Yusuke Suzuki | Atsuhiro Tomioka | April 21, 2019 | TBA |
At New Marineford, Sakazuki discovers that Fujitora has gone to Mariejois. He then orders for Ryokugyu to send him away. Meanwhile, Sengoku recalls the incidents at Impel Down and Marineford two years ago.
| 882 | 100 | "The War of the Best! The Inherited Will of the King of the Pirates!"; Transliteration: "Chōjō Sensō - Tsuga-reta Kaizoku-ō no Ishi" (Japanese: 頂上戦争 継がれた海賊王の意思) | Satoshi Ito | Atsuhiro Tomioka | April 28, 2019 | TBA |
The nobles, including Shirahoshi from the Ryugu Kingdom, continue to gather for the Reverie. Admiral Fujitora talks with Admiral Ryokugyu on how Dr. Vegapunk has invented something that Fujitora believes will make the Seven Warlords unnecessary.
| 883 | 101 | "One Step Forward for Her Dream! Shirahoshi Goes Out in the Sun!"; Transliteration: "Yume no Ippo - Shirahoshi Taiyō no Moto e!" (Japanese: 夢の一歩 しらほし太陽の下へ！) | Katsumi Tokoro | Shōji Yonemura | May 5, 2019 | TBA |
King Stelly (Sabo's adopted brother) of the Goa Kingdom (who became king after the mysterious death of the previous king and crown prince) meets Garp and his envoy from Fish-Man Island, with Stelly's reaction to them showing he is a ignorant coward. Shirahoshi sees the world's surface for the first time. While the royals head up to Mariejois, Morley and Karasu are shown using their Devil Fruit abilities to travel up the Red Line, with Sabo, disguised as a knight, travels up with the royals.
| 884 | 102 | "I Miss Him! Vivi and Rebecca's Sentiments!"; Transliteration: "Aitai - Bibi to Rebekka no Omoi" (Japanese: 会いたい ビビとレベッカの想い) | Yutaka Nakashima | Tomohiro Nakayama | May 12, 2019 | TBA |
The Neptune Family and some other royals reach the top of the Red Line and entered Mariejois. They then arrive at Pangaea Castle and meet with all the participants of the Reverie. Shirahoshi meets Rebecca and Nefertari Vivi after overhearing them talking about Luffy.
| 885 | 103 | "In the Dark Recesses of the Holyland! A Mysterious Giant Straw Hat!"; Transliteration: "Seichi no Yami - Nazo no Kyodaina Mugiwara-bōshi" (Japanese: 聖地の闇 謎の巨大な麦わら帽子) | Yoshihiro Ueda | Jin Tanaka | May 19, 2019 | TBA |
Vivi, Rebecca, and Shirahoshi continue with their conversation about Luffy. Sai becomes reacquainted with Rebecca and Leo. Vivi has an unpleasant encounter with Wapol before having a pleasant reunion with Dalton and Kureha. In Impel Down, Doflamingo wonders if assassins will be sent to kill him as he know a secret about Mariejois. Meanwhile, a mysterious figure enters a chamber containing a large straw hat.
| 886 | 104 | "The Holyland in Tumult! The Targeted Princess Shirahoshi!"; Transliteration: "Seichi Sōzen - Nerawa-reta Shirahoshi-hime!" (Japanese: 聖地騒然 狙われたしらほし姫！) | Masahiro Hosoda | Atsuhiro Tomioka | May 26, 2019 | TBA |
Stelly is brought forward to the Empty Throne, which is meant to symbolize that no one man can rule, but Stelly desires to sit on it, foolishly believing he'll be king of the world if he does so. Meanwhile, Charlos attempts to take Shirahoshi by force with Lucci and Kaku, now a part of CP-0, along with Stussy and a masked agent protecting him. Neptune prepares to attack Charlos until Donquixote Mjosgard, who learned humility because of Otohime's kindness ten years ago, intervenes and knocks out Charlos.
| 887 | 105 | "An Explosive Situation! Two Emperors of the Sea Going After Luffy!"; Transliteration: "Isshoku Sokuhatsu - Rufi Nerau Futari no Yonkō" (Japanese: 一触即発 ルフィ狙う二人の四皇) | Yutaka Nakashima | Shōji Yonemura | June 2, 2019 | TBA |
Big Mom contacts Kaido, informing him that she will be going to Wano Country to take Luffy's head. Kaido objects, bearing his own grudge against Luffy. Back at the Red Port, Garp has a conversation with Gion, Hina, and Tokikake about Luffy's actions against the Kaido and Big Mom. Meanwhile, the Five Elders are approached by a hooded figure, who wants to discuss a certain pirate.
| 888 | 106 | "Sabo Enraged! The Tragedy of the Revolutionary Army Officer Kuma!"; Transliteration: "Sabo Ikaru - Kakumei-gun Kanbu Kuma no Higeki" (Japanese: サボ怒る 革命軍幹部くまの悲劇) | Katsumi Tokoro | Tomohiro Nakayama | June 9, 2019 | TBA |
After Charlos was taken away, Mjosgard promises to protect Shirahoshi during the Reverie. Meanwhile, Sabo sneaks around Mariejois before going to the Domain of the Gods. Jewelry Bonney, who was disguised as the queen of the Sorbet Kingdom, sneaks into the Domain of the Gods when the injured Charlos is brought back there. When meeting his son, Rosward introduces his new slave, Bartholomew Kuma, who is also revealed to be the Sorbet Kingdom's former king. While hiding underground, Sabo and his comrades plan to free Kuma.
| 889 | 107 | "Finally, It Starts! The Conspiracy-filled Reverie!"; Transliteration: "Tsui ni Kaimaku - Inbō Uzumaku Reverī!" (Japanese: 遂に開幕 陰謀渦巻く世界会議(レヴェリー)！) | Yoshihiro Ueda | Jin Tanaka | June 16, 2019 | TBA |
As Rosward and Charlos are returning to their home, Sabo and his comrades hold a strategy meeting. Inside Pangaea Castle, the kings and queens gather in the conference room to begin the Reverie. Meanwhile, the Five Elders have a secret meeting where they bow down to the mysterious individual known as Imu, who sits on the Empty Throne.
Prologue to Wano
| 890 | 108 | "Marco! The Keeper of Whitebeard's Last Memento!"; Transliteration: "Maruko! Shirohige no Katami no Shugosha" (Japanese: マルコ！白ひげの形見の守護者) | Yusuke Suzuki | Atsuhiro Tomioka | June 23, 2019 | TBA |
Cat Viper and the Guardians reach Whitebeard's home island, where Whitebeard and Ace are buried. Cat Viper finds Marco in a hidden village where he works as a doctor. During the meeting, Marco tells Cat Viper about islands like Whitebeard's that can't pay for the Celestial Dragon's Heavenly Tribute aren't allowed to join the World Government, causing them to be under constant threat by pirates and kidnappers, often resulting in many children being orphaned. Whitebeard, being one such orphan, anonymously funneled any money he gathered to the restoration of his island. Marco also tells Cat Viper leave the island because Edward Weevil and his mother, Buckin, who used to be shipmates with Whitebeard nearly forty years ago, are looking for Whitebeard's treasure. Though unsure if Buckin's claims that Weevil is Whitebeard's biological son are true or not, Marco doubts they'll believe that the treasure no longer exists. Marco then asks Cat Viper to give Luffy a message but is shocked to learn that they're targeting Kaido.
| 891 | 109 | "Climbing Up a Waterfall! A Great Journey Through the Land of Wano's Sea Zone!"; Transliteration: "Takinobori! Wano Kuni no Kaiiki Dai-kōkai!" (Japanese: 滝登り！ワノ国の海域大航海！) | Toshinori Fukuzawa | Tomohiro Nakayama | June 30, 2019 | TBA |
After reading about the Reverie in the newspaper, Luffy's group finds themselves in the perilous sea surrounding the Land of Wano. The crew then encounters a school of giant koi fish. The clear water makes the crew wonder if they're in a river as the current leads them to the bottom of a waterfall. Luffy uses the giant koi fish to pull the crew and ship up the waterfall, they then sail into a whirlpool at the top, causing Luffy to be submerged.

== Home media release ==
=== Japanese ===
Avex Pictures (Japan – Region 2/A)
| Volume | | Episodes | Release date | Ref. |
|---|---|---|---|---|
| 19thシーズン ドレスローザ編 | piece.01 | 783–786 | September 6, 2017 | |
| 19thシーズン ドレスローザ編 | piece.02 | 787–790 | October 4, 2017 | |
| 19thシーズン ドレスローザ編 | piece.03 | 791–794 | November 1, 2017 | |
| 19thシーズン ドレスローザ編 | piece.04 | 795–798 | December 6, 2017 | |
| 19thシーズン ドレスローザ編 | piece.05 | 799–802 | January 10, 2018 | |
| 19thシーズン ドレスローザ編 | piece.06 | 803–806 | February 7, 2018 | |
| 19thシーズン ドレスローザ編 | piece.07 | 807–810 | March 7, 2018 | |
| 19thシーズン ドレスローザ編 | piece.08 | 811–814 | April 4, 2018 | |
| 19thシーズン ドレスローザ編 | piece.09 | 815–818 | May 2, 2018 | |
| 19thシーズン ドレスローザ編 | piece.10 | 819–822 | June 6, 2018 | |
| 19thシーズン ドレスローザ編 | piece.11 | 824–826 | July 4, 2018 | |
| 19thシーズン ドレスローザ編 | piece.12 | 827–830 | August 1, 2018 | |
| 19thシーズン ドレスローザ編 | piece.13 | 831–834 | September 5, 2018 | |
| 19thシーズン ドレスローザ編 | piece.14 | 835–838 | October 3, 2018 | |
| 19thシーズン ドレスローザ編 | piece.15 | 839–842 | November 7, 2018 | |
| 19thシーズン ドレスローザ編 | piece.16 | 843–846 | December 5, 2018 | |
| 19thシーズン ドレスローザ編 | piece.17 | 847–850 | January 9, 2019 | |
| 19thシーズン ドレスローザ編 | piece.18 | 851–854 | February 6, 2019 | |
| 19thシーズン ドレスローザ編 | piece.19 | 855–858 | March 6, 2019 | |
| 19thシーズン ドレスローザ編 | piece.20 | 859–862 | April 3, 2019 | |
| 19thシーズン ドレスローザ編 | piece.21 | 863–866 | May 8, 2019 | |
| 19thシーズン ドレスローザ編 | piece.22 | 867–870 | June 5, 2019 | |
| 19thシーズン ドレスローザ編 | piece.23 | 871–874 | July 3, 2019 | |
| 19thシーズン ドレスローザ編 | piece.24 | 875–878 | August 7, 2019 | |
| 19thシーズン ドレスローザ編 | piece.25 | 879–882 | September 4, 2019 | |
| 19thシーズン ドレスローザ編 | piece.26 | 883–885 | October 2, 2019 | |
| 19thシーズン ドレスローザ編 | piece.27 | 886–888 | November 6, 2019 | |
| 19thシーズン ドレスローザ編 | piece.28 | 889–891 | December 4, 2019 | |
| ONE PIECE Log Collection | "WHOLE CAKE ISLAND" | 783–796 | June 26, 2020 | |
| ONE PIECE Log Collection | "GERMA" | 797–809 | July 31, 2020 | |
| ONE PIECE Log Collection | "PUDDING" | 810–822 | August 8, 2020 | |
| ONE PIECE Log Collection | "WEDDING" | 823–835 | September 25, 2020 | |
| ONE PIECE Log Collection | "BIG MOM" | 836–849 | June 21, 2021 | |
| ONE PIECE Log Collection | "KATAKURI" | 850–863 | July 30, 2021 | |
| ONE PIECE Log Collection | "SNAKEMAN" | 864–877 | August 27, 2021 | |
| ONE PIECE Log Collection | "LEVELY" | 878–891 | September 24, 2021 | |

=== English ===
Crunchyroll LLC (North America – Region 1/A); Madman Entertainment (Australia and New Zealand – Region 4/B)
| Volume | | Episodes | Release date | | | ISBN | Ref. |
| Volume | | Episodes | NA | UK & IE | AUS & NZ | ISBN | Ref. |
|---|---|---|---|---|---|---|---|
| Season Thirteen | Voyage One | 783–794 | July 4, 2023 | N/A | N/A | ISBN N/A | |
| Season Thirteen | Voyage Two | 795–806 | August 8, 2023 | N/A | N/A | ISBN N/A | |
| Season Thirteen | Voyage Three | 807–818 | September 12, 2023 | N/A | N/A | ISBN N/A | |
| Season Thirteen | Voyage Four | 819–830 | January 9, 2024 | N/A | N/A | ISBN N/A | |
| Season Thirteen | Voyage Five | 831–842 | February 13, 2024 | N/A | N/A | ISBN N/A | |
| Season Thirteen | Voyage Six | 843–854 | March 12, 2024 | N/A | N/A | ISBN N/A | |
| Season Thirteen | Voyage Seven | 855–866 | May 7, 2024 | N/A | N/A | ISBN N/A | |
| Season Thirteen | Voyage Eight | 867–878 | July 9, 2024 | N/A | N/A | ISBN N/A | |
| Season Thirteen | Voyage Nine | 879–891 | August 13, 2024 | N/A | N/A | ISBN N/A | |
| Collection | 32 | 771–794 | August 8, 2023 | September 4, 2023 | N/A | ISBN N/A | |
| Collection | 33 | 795–818 | December 12, 2023 | December 12, 2023 | N/A | ISBN N/A | |
| Collection | 34 | 819–842 | May 7, 2024 | October 7, 2024 | N/A | ISBN N/A | |
| Collection | 35 | 843–866 | October 15, 2024 | November 11, 2024 | N/A | ISBN N/A | |
| Collection | 36 | 867–891 | February 11, 2025 | March 10, 2025 | N/A | ISBN N/A | |

== Reception ==
Writing for Anime News Network, Sam Leach awarded the first two Reverie episodes a "B−" and "B" rating; Leach praised the character interactions, but described the lengthy flashback sequences as "disposable" and argued that at times the anime's pacing was not sympathetic to the manga material it adapted.
