= Mojacko =

Japanese manga series

- Volume 1 of the Mojacko manga.

モジャ公 (Moja-kō)
- Genre: Comedy, Fantasy, Sci-fi
- Manga
- Written by: Fujiko F. Fujio (Note: Previously credited as Fujiko Fujio during its original serialization.)
- Published by: Kodansha
- Magazine: Weekly Bokura Magazine
- Original run: 1969 – 1970
- Volumes: 2
- Manga

Uchū Friend: Mojacko
- Written by: Masahito
- Published by: Shogakukan
- Magazine: CoroCoro Comic
- Original run: September 1995 – April 1996
- Volumes: 1
- Anime television series
- Directed by: Tetsuya Endo
- Produced by: Keisuke Iwata; Yumiko Yazaki
- Written by: Tatsuya Fuji; Kenji Terada
- Music by: Kei Wakakusa
- Studio: OLM, Inc.
- Licensed by: Enoki Films
- Original network: TXN (TV Tokyo)
- Original run: October 3, 1995 – March 31, 1997
- Episodes: 74

Mojacko (モジャ公, Moja-kō; "Duke Moja") is a shōnen manga series written and illustrated by Fujiko F. Fujio. It was first serialized in Kodansha's Weekly Bokura Magazine in 1969 to 1970, for 35 chapters, eventually compiled into 2 tankōbon volumes. It was then revived twice by Masahito and published in Shogakukan's CoroCoro Comic from September 1995 to April 1996, with a total of 1 volume. The manga revolves around Sorao Amano, an ordinary student who befriends two aliens stranded on their planet while helping them to get home.

The series was later adapted into anime, directed by Tetsuya Endo and produced by OLM, Inc. It premiered on October 3, 1995, and ran until March 31, 1997, with a total of 74 episodes.

Enoki Films once licensed the series outside Japan.

== Synopsis ==
Sorao is an ordinary student who lives an ordinary life of a typical kid, but his life is tough due to being the only representative of the school's Science Fiction Club. One Day, he heard that strange ghosts haunt an abandoned construction site and he and his friend Miki decided to investigate. They accidentally make friends with two aliens who were stranded on Earth after their ship crashed. His life changes as he helps them find their way home, the Moja Planet. As the story progresses, wherein they do reach the aliens' homeworld, Sorao, along with Miki, discover a feud between two different tribes. Things gone awry as the tribes' representatives try to outdo one another in search of the missing treasure of the past with the help of an uncovered clue.

In the manga, Sorao thinks about running away from home, due to the boredom of his life. He meets Mojacko and Donmo, who came to earth looking for a companion for a journey to space. He agrees to come with them, and goes on a fun, yet dangerous, adventure through space, and visit different planets.

== Characters ==
=== Main characters ===
Sorao Amano (天野 空夫, Amano Sorao)
Voiced by: Ai Orikasa
Sorao Amano is Mojacko's friend on Earth and the main hero. He was a typical student, not less strong and smart but still unmissable in many trials. He is also the president of the SF (Science Fiction) Club. He has a crush on the club's vice president named Miki.
Mojara (モジャラ, Mojara)
Voiced by: Mayumi Tanaka
Mojara (named Mojacko (モジャ公, Mojakō) in anime) is an alien from the Moja Planet. He had many tools hidden in his mouth and is able to inflate himself by inhaling too much air which he uses to lift himself, or as a mode of transportation for the others. He can also stretch his tongue for many miles. His full name is Duke Mojara Hanamogera Sanadabintonikusu Furansasukatchi Ritorufuddo Bikunin Arekisandorobonikku Konikkutaranberi- Kuchukuchu Suppabibbi- Poppo- which he usually uses to introduce himself, causing everyone to almost fall asleep. He also likes girls and sometimes flirts with them. He is also afraid of water; when he gets wet, his body becomes paralyzed as it melts, which is normal for his species, but he seems to be immune to hot water.
Donmo (ドンモ, Donmo)
Voiced by: Daiki Nakamura
Donmo is a robot accompanied by Mojara who helps to solve problems for both Sorao and Mojara. Whenever he consumes too much sweets, he becomes drunk in the same way humans become drunk when consuming too much alcohol. He was renamed to Domon in the Philippine release.
Miki (みき, Miki)
Voiced by: Junko Iwao
Miki Kawano is Sorao's childhood friend and also his love interest. The vice president of the SF Club, she is very bold and very reliable unlike Sorao. She is also the cause of the rivalry for both Pitekan and Sorao.
Pitekan (ピテカン, Pitekan)
Voiced by: Wataru Takagi
The class bully, Pitekan is Sorao's rival in school when it comes to clubs and to Miki. He is the leader of the ESP club, and believes that he can do Psychokinesis, which others find confusing, except to his two lackeys. His real name is Sakamoto Kanta, but this is only mentioned in the Anime. He was renamed to Wutan in the Philippine release.
Mojari (モジャリ, Mojari)
Voiced by: Sanae Miyuki
Only appearing in the Anime, Mojari is Mojara's younger sister. She can be stern and serious to her older brother, sometimes scolding him on what he's doing wrong or just being stupid. She also displays some motherly instincts on taking care of their younger brother, Mojaru.
Mojaru (モジャル, Mojaru)
Voiced by: Megumi Hayashibara
Only appearing in the Anime, Mojaru is Mojara's younger brother. Despite being a baby, Mojaru is quite talented and also very good at technical stuff such as creating weird gadgets or fixing things. He cannot speak properly, instead saying "Moja" all the time. Mojaru also shows a lot of crybaby tendencies, in which his cries can create a powerful sonic wave that can decimate everything in its path, including destroying a whole planet in its wake.
Momonja (モモンジャ, Momonja)
Voiced by: Urara Takano
The Prince of the Momonja Tribe and Mojara's Rival, Momonja is skilled in stealth and ninja-like skills and is obsessed on getting the "Greatest Treasure in the Universe". He has strong feelings for Mojari and as a running gag, he literally turns into stone whenever he sees or comes into contact with her.
Gonsuke (ゴンスケ, Gonsuke)
Voiced by: Kenichi Ogata
Mojara's spaceship computer who is a Robot from Sweet potato planet, he is active between the spaceship computer and the TV in Sorao's House. He can be very helpful if they are clueless.

=== Manga ===
Otto (オット, Otto)
He is a furseal-like alien with a Kansai dialect. He is a very clever swindler, which got Sorao, Mojacko and Donmoin great danger.
Takopetti (タコペッティ, Takopetti)
An octopus-like alien who is also an extreme documentary filmmaker, author of "Cruel Space Story". His name is a reference to Italian documentary filmmaker, Gualtiero Jacopetti.
Mona Monasis (モナ・モナシス, Mona Monashisu)
A young lady who travels carefree in her rocket, "The Esmeralda". She participated in the Dinosaur Hunt game, and the "Asteroid Rally", which is a grand prix in outer space.
Mue (ムエ, Mue)
A Nue-like creature, dressed in a hooded cloak. He can teleport, and use telekinesis and clairvoyance. He chased and tried to kill Sorao, believing he was the enemy of his father. He was later modified in an episode for 21emon.
Mokubee (もくべえ, Mokubee)
A hunter alien that hired Mojacko and friends to help him hunt the mystery of the biological Danboko.

== Anime ==
The anime adaptation was directed by Tetsuya Endo and produced by OLM, Inc.; the studio best known for the Pokémon anime franchise. The anime was broadcast on TV Tokyo and its affiliates between October 3, 1995, and March 31, 1997, consisting of 74 episodes.

The opening themes were "CHU-CHU-CHU" from episodes 1–34, performed by CRIPTON, then "Dream Express", performed by Saki Natori, from episodes 35–50, and then "Shine" by Dear from episodes 51–74. The ending themes were "Koibito ga Uchuujin nara", performed by Junko Iwao, from episodes 1–34, then "Jaa ne" performed by Kiyomi Kobayashi from episodes 35–50, then "Dou nacchatan darou" by ZIZI from episodes 51–69, then "Too Late" by Yuki Saito from episodes 70–74. In Indonesia, this anime was broadcast by TPI from 1995 to 1997. In the Philippines, this anime was broadcast by GMA Network in the late 1990s dubbed in Filipino.
