= Tetsuya Endō (director) =

Japanese anime director

- Born: September 7, 1960 (age 66); Tokyo, Japan
- Occupations: Anime director, storyboard artist, sound director

Tetsuya Endō (遠藤 徹哉 or えんどうてつや, Endō Tetsuya; born September 7, 1960) is a Japanese anime director, storyboard artist, and sound director. He worked as the assistant director (演出助手, enshutsu joshu) of My Neighbor Totoro in 1988, and directed Floral Magician Mary Bell in 1992–93.

== Credits ==
- My Neighbor Totoro (1988; Assistant Director)
- Jankenman (1991-1992; Director, Screenplay, Storyboard, Episode Director)
- Floral Magician Mary Bell (1992-1993; Director, Script, Storyboard, Episode Director)
- Yaiba (1993-1994; Director, Storyboard)
- Chō Kuse ni Narisō (1994-1995; Director)
- Mojacko (1995-1997; Director)
- Serial Experiments Lain (video game) (1998; Director, Storyboard)
- Hikaru no Go (2001-2003; Director (episodes 58-75), Storyboard (Opening 3; episodes 16-24 even, 27, 30, 36, 41, 43, 48-54 even, 60, 66, 74-75), Episode Director (episodes 16-24 even, 27–28, 30-36 even, 39, 41, 43, 48-54 even, 60, 66, 74-75), Unit Director (OP 3), Art (episodes 18-24 even, 30)
- Saiyuki Reload (2003-2004; Director, Storyboards, Series Story Editor, Sound Director)
- Saiyuki Gunlock (2004; Director, Series Story Editor, Sound Director)
- Mahō Sensei Negima! (2005; Storyboards, Episode Director)
- Petopeto-san (2005; Storyboards (episodes 2, 6), Episode Director (episode 1))
- Kōtetsu Sangokushi (2007; Chief Director)
- Digimon Fusion (2010-2012; Series Director, Storyboard (episodes 37, 43, 49), Episode Director (episodes 1, 12, 54))
- ARP Backstage Pass (2020; Director)
