= Flower Witch Mary Bell =

Japanese anime television series

- Mary Bell, Tambourine, and fairies

花の魔法使いマリーベル (Hana no Mahōtsukai Mary Bell)
- Genre: Magical girl
- Anime television series
- Directed by: Tetsuya Endo
- Produced by: Chiyo Okazaki (TV Setouchi), Tomoyuki Taguchi (Big West), Masaru Umehara (Ashi Productions)
- Written by: Takao Koyama, Hideki Mitsui
- Music by: Takako Ishiguro
- Studio: Ashi Productions
- Original network: TXN (TV Setouchi)
- Original run: February 3, 1992 – January 18, 1993
- Episodes: 50
- Anime film

The Key of Phoenix
- Directed by: Tetsuya Endo
- Studio: Shochiku, Toho, Ashi Productions
- Released: August 8, 1992
- Runtime: 43 minutes
- Original video animation

Mary Bell's Traffic Safety
- Directed by: Tetsuya Endo
- Studio: Ashi Productions
- Released: February 15, 1993
- Runtime: 13 minutes
- Original video animation

Mary Bell's Fire Prevention: What to Do When an Earthquake Occurs
- Directed by: Tetsuya Endo
- Studio: Ashi Productions
- Released: February 15, 1993
- Runtime: 11 minutes

Flower Witch Mary Bell (花の魔法使いマリーベル, Hana no Mahōtsukai Marī Beru), or known as Mary Bell in some countries, is a Japanese magical girl anime series by Ashi Productions, aired from 1992 until 1993. The series was adapted as a theatrical film and two educational videos and the DVD version was released on March 20, 2004.

== Story ==
Yuuri and Ken are two siblings living in the port town of Sunny Bell, where their parents have recently moved and set up a flower shop. They are given the Mary Bell Picture Book from their neighbor Rose, which is a story about two children who get lost in the forest and are helped by a magical girl named Mary Bell. The children wish together that Mary Bell was there to help their parents' struggling flower shop. Suddenly, Mary Bell appears in front of them, introducing herself and her Seelie Court partner Tambourine, and agreeing to help them with magic. Over the course of the series, Mary Bell, Ken, Yuuri, a dog named Ribbon, and the others go on adventures in both Sunny Bell and the Flower Magic World, Mary Bell's home.

The series finale involves the Holy Tree of the Flower Magic World coming to Sunny Bell in order to take away all of the plants on Earth, as it believes is necessary to prevent humans from harming them. Mary Bell and the townspeople are able to convince it not to do this, and Mary Bell decides to stay on Earth and encourage people with magic, even though her goal (to collect the dreams of humans by helping them) has already been completed.

== Characters ==
=== Main characters ===
Mary Bell (マリーベル, Marī Beru)
Voiced by: Chieko Honda
Mary Bell is a "floral magician" from the Flower Magic World (花魔法界, hanamahō-kai) who helps children or others when they are trying to do something. Her catchphrase is "Just leave it to Mary Bell!" (マリーベルにおまかせよ!, Marī Beru ni omakase yo!)
Tambourine (タンバリン, Tanbarin)
Voiced by: Chika Sakamoto
Tambourine is Mary Bell's magical companion from the seelie court.
Yūri (ユーリ, Yūri)
Voiced by: Satomi Koorogi (Yūri), Voiced by: Ai Orikasa (Ken)
Yūri and Ken are siblings who befriend Mary Bell.
Rose (ローズ, Rōzu) Voiced by: Naoko Kyoda (adult); Chisa Yokoyama and Kumiko Nishihara (childhood)
Rose is a nice old lady who believes in fairies who lives alone next door to the Mary Bell flower shop with her dog, Ribbon. When Mary Bell first appeared, Yūri and Ken did not believe she was the real Mary Bell; while she met Mary Bell, Rose immediately told that she wanted to meet her.
Ribbon (リボン, Ribon) Voiced by: Kotono Mitsuishi
Ribbon is Rose' dog.
Takuro (タクロー, Takurō) and Remi (レミ, Remi)
Voiced by: Kenichi Ono (Takuro), Voiced by: Sakiko Tamagawa (Remi)
Takuro and Remi are Yūri and Ken's parents who own Mary Bell flower shop.
Bart (バート, Bāto)
Voiced by: Tomomichi Nishimura (adult); Kappei Yamaguchi (childhood)
Bart is a stubborn old man who lives next to Grandma Rose and does not like flowers.
Jito (ジート, Jīto)
Voiced by: Yasunori Matsumoto (first voice); Kōji Tsujitani (second voice)
Jito is Bart's 20-year-old nephew who lives in his house. When he was a little child, he got lost and helped by fairies. His friends did not believe him and called him a liar. Since then, Jito keeps trying to capture a fairy to prove that he told the truth.
Vivian (ビビアン, Bibian) Voiced by: Akiko Yajima
Realistic yet does not believe in fairies, Vivian is Bart's granddaughter who lives in his house. She is about the same age as Yuuri.
Bongo (ボンゴ, Bongo) and Tap (タップ, Tappu)
Voiced by: Chie Satō (Bongo), Voiced by: Kotono Mitsuishi (Tap)
Bongo and Tap are Vivian's friends.
Bra (ブラ, Bura) Noppo (ノッポ, Noppo)
Voiced by: Kōzō Shioya (Bra), Voiced by: Chō (Noppo)
Bra and Noppo are the local policemen.
Maggie Edelweiss (マギー・エーデルワイス, Magī Eederuwaisu)
Voiced by: Sayuri Ikemoto
Maggie Edelweiss is a news reporter implied to be originally from North America who works at the local television station.
Professor Sherbour (シェルボー教授, Sherubō Kyōju)
Voiced by: Takuzo Kamiyama
Professor Sherbour is Mary Bell's professor.
Papabel von Decasse (パパベル・フォン・デカッセ, Papa Beru fon Dekasse) Voiced by: Shō Hayami
Calm and manly, Papabel von Decasse is Mary Bell's father who is known as a genius magician. His magical spell is "Paparin, Berlin, Lan Lan Run".
Mamabel von Decasse (ママベル・フォン・デカッセ, Mama Beru fon Dekasse)
Voiced by: Sumi Shimamoto
Mamabel von Decasse is Mary Bell's mother. Her magical spell is "Mamarin, Berlin, Lunrunlun".

== Media ==
=== Anime ===
The TV series was produced by TV Setouchi, Big West, and Ashi Productions and directed by Tetsuya Endo, with series composition by Takao Koyama and Hideki Mitsui. The animation directors include Masashi Hirota, Kōichirō (新羽高一浪), Yuriko Chiba, and Kouji Fukazawa. These four supervised about 80% of the 50 episodes.

=== Episodes ===
No.	Title	Original release date
1	"Hi! I'm Mary Bell"; Transliteration: "Konnichiwa! Watashi Marī Beru" (Japanese: こんにちは! 私マリーベル)	February 3, 1992
2	"The Neighbor Hates Flowers"; Transliteration: "Otonari-san wa Hana Kirai" (Japanese: お隣さんは花嫌い)	February 10, 1992
3	"Hello, Graffiti Paradise!"; Transliteration: "Raku Kaki Tengoku Konnichiwa" (Japanese: らく書き天国こんにちは)	February 17, 1992
4	"Ken Gets His Talent from Papa! (You Are Really My Son, Ken!)"; Transliteration: "Yappari Ken wa Papa no Ko da" (Japanese: やっぱりケンはパパの子だ)	February 24, 1992
5	"Tree of Memories in Sunny Bell"; Transliteration: "Sanī Bery no Omoide no Ki" (Japanese: サニーベルの思い出の木)	March 2, 1992
6	"Quarrel in the 500,000th Year"; Transliteration: "50-man-nen no Kenka" (Japanese: 50万年目のケンカ)	March 9, 1992
7	"I Love You, Julia!"; Transliteration: "Daisuki! Juria!" (Japanese: 大好き!ジュリア!)	March 16, 1992
8	"Fly High in the Sky, Peepchee!"; Transliteration: "Habatake Picchī Ōzora e" (Japanese: はばたけピッチー大空へ)	March 23, 1992
9	"Cherry Festival of Fairies"; Transliteration: "Yōsei-tachi no Sakuramatsuri" (Japanese: 妖精たちの桜祭り)	March 30, 1992
10	"Fairy Hunter Jito Arrives!"; Transliteration: "Yōsei Hanta·Jīto Tōjō!" (Japanese: 妖精ハンター·ジート登場!)	April 6, 1992
11	"Audition for a TV Commercial"; Transliteration: "Marī Beru no CM Kontesuto" (Japanese: マリーベルのCMコンテスト)	April 13, 1992
12	"Huge Happening in Flower House"; Transliteration: "Furawā Hausu no Dai Jiken" (Japanese: フラワーハウスの大事件)	April 20, 1992
13	"Where's My Old Toy?"; Transliteration: "Omoide no Omocha wa Do〜ko?" (Japanese: 想い出のオモチャはど〜こ?)	April 27, 1992
14	"Bongo's Mother's Day Gift"; Transliteration: "Bongo no Haha no Hi Purezento" (Japanese: ボンゴの母の日プレゼント)	May 4, 1992
15	"The Prince in Love with Yuuri"; Transliteration: "Yūru ni Koi Shita Ōji-sama" (Japanese: ユーリに恋した王子さま)	May 11, 1992
16	"My Dad is a Game Producer"; Transliteration: "Uchi no Papa wa Gēmu Satsuka" (Japanese: うちのパパはゲーム作家)	May 18, 1992
17	"Jito's Evil Plan"; Transliteration: "Jīto no Waru Dakumi" (Japanese: ジートのわるだくみ)	May 25, 1992
18	"Bongo & Tap's Great Voyage!?"; Transliteration: "Bonto to Tappu no Dai Kōkai!?" (Japanese: ボンゴとタップの大航海!?)	June 1, 1992
19	"Camping is Fun! (Camp is Fun!)"; Transliteration: "Kyanpu wa Tanoshi!" (Japanese: キャンプは楽し!)	June 8, 1992
20	"Friendship in the Unicycle Race"; Transliteration: "Yūjō no Ichirinsha Rēsu" (Japanese: 友情の一輪車レース)	June 15, 1992
21	"Paula from the Starland"; Transliteration: "Hoshi no Kuno kara Kita Pōra" (Japanese: 星の国から来たポーラ)	June 22, 1992
22	"Ken's First Errand"; Transliteration: "Ken no Hajimete no Otsukai" (Japanese: ケンの初めてのお使い)	June 29, 1992
23	"Stray Mermaid Princess"; Transliteration: "Maigo no Maigo no Ningyo Hime" (Japanese: 迷子の迷子の人魚姫)	July 6, 1992
24	"Jito Appears Yet Again"; Transliteration: "Matamata Jīto ga Yattekita" (Japanese: またまたジートがやってきた)	July 13, 1992
25	"Yuuri and the Mischievous Dolphin"; Transliteration: "Yūri to Itazura Iruka" (Japanese: ユーリといたずらイルカ)	July 20, 1992
26	"Does the Phoenix Exist or Not?"; Transliteration: "Iruka Inai ka Fenikkusu" (Japanese: いるかいないかフェニックス)	July 27, 1992
27	"Mary Bell Picture Book"; Transliteration: "Marī Beru no Ehon" (Japanese: マリーベルの絵本)	August 3, 1992
28	"Vivian and Chacha, the Kitten"; Transliteration: "Bibian to Koneko no Chacha" (Japanese: ビビアンと子猫のチャチャ)	August 10, 1992
29	"Old Clock in the Haunted Mansion"; Transliteration: "Yūrei Yushiki no Furudokei" (Japanese: ゆうれい屋敷の古時計)	August 17, 1992
30	"Vivian of the Lost Forest"; Transliteration: "Mayoi no Mori no Bibian" (Japanese: 迷いの森のビビアン)	August 24, 1992
31	"The Pandemonium at the Flower Door"; Transliteration: "Furawā Doa de Dai Kanran" (Japanese: フラワードアで大混乱)	August 31, 1992
32	"Retrieve the Table Lamp"; Transliteration: "Tēburu Ranpu o Torikaese" (Japanese: テーブルランプを取り返せ)	September 7, 1992
33	"Mary Bell's Mother and Father"; Transliteration: "Marī Beru no Papa to Mama" (Japanese: マリーベルのパパとママ)	September 14, 1992
34	"The Snack Shop and the Suspicious Two"; Transliteration: "Okashi no Ie to Okashina Futari" (Japanese: お菓子の家とおかしな二人)	September 21, 1992
35	"Grandma Rose Becomes a Child"; Transliteration: "Kodomo ni Natta Rōzu-san" (Japanese: 子供になったローズさん)	September 28, 1992
36	"Mary Bell's Tour of the Moon"; Transliteration: "Marī Beru no Getsukai Ryokō" (Japanese: マリーベルの月世界旅行)	October 5, 1992
37	"Ken and the Two-Horned Unicorn"; Transliteration: "Ken to 2-pon-kaku no Yunikōn" (Japanese: ケンと2本角のユニコーン)	October 12, 1992
38	"Tambourine Has Been Captured!"; Transliteration: "Tanbarin ga Tsukamatta!" (Japanese: タンバリンがつかまった!)	October 19, 1992
39	"Rescue Mission to Save Tambourine!"; Transliteration: "Tanbarin Kyūshutsu Dai Sakusen!" (Japanese: タンバリン救出大作戦!)	October 26, 1992
40	"Search for the Cosmos Fairies"; Transliteration: "Kosumosu no Yōsei no Sagashite" (Japanese: コスモスの妖精を捜して)	November 2, 1992
41	"Do Your Best! Love Cupid"; Transliteration: "Ganbare! Ai no Kyūpiddo" (Japanese: がんばれ!愛のキューピット)	November 9, 1992
42	"Vivian Has Been Kidnapped!?"; Transliteration: "Yūsei Sareta Bibian!?" (Japanese: 誘拐されたビビアン!?)	November 16, 1992
43	"A Wish on the Day That Snows"; Transliteration: "Yuki no Furu-hi no Negaigoto" (Japanese: 雪の降る日の願いごと)	November 23, 1992
44	"Grass Panic"; Transliteration: "Togetoge Sō Panikku" (Japanese: トゲトゲ草パニック)	November 30, 1992
45	"Mary Bell in the Mysterious Country"; Transliteration: "Fushiki no Kuni no Marī Beru" (Japanese: 不思議の国のマリーベル)	December 7, 1992
46	"The Uproar of the Jiji-Bell Santa"; Transliteration: "Jiji-Beru Santa no Dai Sōdō" (Japanese: ジジベルサンタの大騒動)	December 14, 1992
47	"Do Your Best! Tambourine"; Transliteration: "Ganbare! Tanbarin" (Japanese: がんばれ!タンバリン)	December 21, 1992
48	"The Sunny Bell Incident"; Transliteration: "Sanī Beru no Ichidaiji" (Japanese: サニーベルの一大事)	January 4, 1993
49	"Mary Bell and the Sacred Tree"; Transliteration: "Marī Beru to Seinaru Ki" (Japanese: マリーベルと聖なる樹)	January 11, 1993
50	"A Dream to You"; Transliteration: "Yume o Anata ni" (Japanese: 夢をあなたに)	January 18, 1993

=== Soundtrack ===
Mary Bell to Utaō!

Soundtrack album by Michiyo Nakajima, Chieko Honda, etc.
- Released: July 17, 1992
- Genre: Anime OST
- Length: 64:24
- Label: Pony Canyon

The soundtrack album, Let's Sing with Mary Bell! (マリーベルと歌おう！, Mary Bell to Utaō!) was released on July 17, 1992.

==== Track listing ====
No.	Title	Writer(s)	Length
1.	"Sure You Can!"	Shota Namikawa
2.	"Magical Theme"
3.	"I'm Mary Bell!"
4.	"Tambourine's Theme"
5.	"Yuuri's Theme"
6.	"Ken's Theme"
7.	"Remi's Theme"
8.	"Takuro's Theme"
9.	"Grandma Rose's Theme"
10.	"Bart's Theme"
11.	"Bro & Noppo's Theme"
12.	"Bongo, Tap, and Vivian's Theme"
13.	"Julia & Ribbon's Theme"
14.	"Sunny Bell Town's Theme"
15.	"Night in Sunny Bell"
16.	"Seaside Hill"
17.	"Thank Goodness, Flowers Are Selling Well"
18.	"Lake Theme"
19.	"Hiking Theme"
20.	"Children's Park"
21.	"I'll Tell You Something Nice"
22.	"Moving"
23.	"Falling Down"
24.	"Major Shock"
25.	"Happy Surprise"
26.	"Marching (Courage)"
27.	"Lament - Decision"
28.	"Really Wonderful, Mary Bell"
29.	"Not Even in Your Memory"
30.	"Sure You Can" (Karaoke Version)
31.	"Not Even in Your Memory" (Karaoke Version)
