= Ehrgeiz (TV series) =

Japanese anime television series

- Ehrgeiz VHS Boxart, Volume 1

ネクスト戦記EHRGEIZ (エーアガイツ) (Nekusuto senki EHRGEIZ)
- Genre: Action, Science fiction, Mecha
- Anime television series
- Directed by: Toshifumi Kawase
- Produced by: Katsuya Shirai
- Written by: Atsuhiro Tomioka
- Music by: Akifumi Tada; Shiroh Hamaguchi
- Studio: Studio Deen; Ehrgeiz (assistance)
- Licensed by: Bandai Entertainment (AnimeVillage)
- Original network: TV Tokyo; AT-X
- Original run: October 2, 1997 – December 25, 1997
- Episodes: 12

Ehrgeiz (ネクスト戦記EHRGEIZ, Nekusuto senki EHRGEIZ; lit. Record of the Next War Ehrgeiz) is an original 1997 Japanese anime television series from et, with animation by Studio Deen, and produced by d-rights and BeStack. The title is a mix of Japanese and German.

The North American release by Bandai Entertainment (then AnimeVillage) used only the German "Ehrgeiz" which, when translated into English, means "ambition". The show was originally aired late at night (being the first TV mecha anime to do so) on TV Tokyo; however, Ehrgeiz was eventually re-run on the cable/satellite channel AT-X in 1999.

== Story ==
Earth started space colonization by creating the Next Colonies. The Next forces later rebelled, and created the Next Government. The rebellion became a war, and the multi-purpose Metal Vehicles, MVs for short, were changed for battle purposes. Meanwhile, Terra, an Earth Rebellion force, started creating more trouble for Earth. Now, a mysterious MV-like being, S.A.C ("S" for short), is loose, and Next wants it so that they can win the war. Terra's psychic leader, Hal, has been sensing "S", and wants to know more about the power it has. The future of these three groups will be up to a bunch of outlaws who live on the abandoned Next 7 colony, though no one knows that yet....

=== Main characters ===
Jay Striker
Voiced by: Mitsuo Iwata
The "Hero" of the story and the leader of the Next 7 outlaws. He was once a member of the Next forces, as an MV pilot.
Camel
Voiced by: Joji Nakata
A "cool" businessman type.
Balzak
Voiced by: Osamu Osaka
A former Next forces soldier.
Ken
Voiced by: Urara Takano (Japanese); Alex Doduk (English)
Anne's brother. His parents were killed in the battle of "Next 7".
Ann
Voiced by: Ikue Otani (Japanese); Chantal Strand (English)
Ken's sister. Her parents were killed in the battle of "Next 7".
Gord
Voiced by: Masamichi Sato
An MV developer. Formerly an MV pilot for Earth's military.
Roddy
Voiced by: Nobuyuki Hiyama (Japanese); Scott McNeil (English)
Characterized by his pouty lips. Also a former MV pilot for Earth's military.
Akane Aoi
Voiced by: Miyuki Ichijo
Captain of the Next forces.
Arnold
Voiced by: Yusaku Yara
A Next forces cyborg. S.A.C. was developed to capture his bodily tissues.
Hal
Voiced by: Nozomu Sasaki (Japanese); Brent Miller (English)
The leader of the Revolutionary Organization TERRA on Earth. He is a psychic.
Galbraith
Voiced by: Tesshō Genda (Japanese); Scott McNeil (English)
Hal's bodyguard.
Carl
Voiced by: Mitsuaki Hoshino
Akane's subordinate. Killed in action as soon as he is introduced.

=== Mecha ===
M.V.
Stands for "Metal Vehicle". This is how all piloted robots are referred to in the series (i.e. "Jay's M.V.)
S
S.A.C. is mounted in an unmanned, state-of-the-art MV. S.A.C. stands for "System of Absolutely Conscience". This powerful M.V. is sought after by the Next forces throughout the series.

== Staff ==
Staff
Original Concept	et
Series Director	Toshifumi Kawase
Series Composition	Atsuhiro Tomioka
Screenplay	Atsuhiro Tomioka, Chinatsu Houjou, Kouji Miura and Toshiyashu Nagata
Character Designs	Isamu Imakake (original) and Tetsuya Yanagisawa (animation)
Animation Director	Naoki Hishikawa and Mihiro Yamaguchi
Mechanical Design	Takahiro Yamada and Takahiro Umehara
Color Setting	Takeshi Mochida
Art Director	Tsutomi Ishigaki
Director of Photography	Seiichi Morishita and Katsuaki Kamata
Music	Akifumi Tada and Shiroh Hamaguchi
Sound Director	Kazuhiro Wakabayashi
Executive Producer	Katsuya Shirai
Animation Production	Studio Deen
Presented by	Project EHRGEIZ, d-rights, BeStack, Bandai

== Media ==
=== VHS, LaserDisc & streaming ===
VHS tapes and LaserDiscs of Ehrgeiz were released by Bandai Visual (under their Emotion label) with the first volume released on May 25, 1998, the second on June 25, the third on July 25, the fourth on August 25, the fifth on September 25, and the sixth on October 25, all in the same year.

In 1999, AnimeVillage.com (later Bandai Entertainment) began releasing subtitled VHS volumes of the anime. The first two volumes released in November and December (respectively) of that year, and the final four volumes released between January and March 2000. A single dubbed VHS tape of the first two episodes was also released by AnimeVillage. However, likely due to poor sales of the subbed tapes, AnimeVillage later cancelled the English dubbed version.

All 12 episodes of Ehrgeiz were later made legally available for digital streaming via the Bandai Channel, courtesy of Bandai Visual. Currently, the series has no DVD or Blu-Ray release in either Japan or North America.

=== Themes ===
Opening theme
"Dream Jack" by HUMMING BIRD

Episodes 1–12

Ending theme
"One Voice for EHRGEIZ" by Mariko Fukui

Episodes 1–12
