= Humanoid Monster Bem =

Japanese anime television series and its adaptations

妖怪人間ベム (Yōkai Ningen Bemu)
- Genre: Horror, adventure
- Anime television series
- Directed by: Noburo Ishiguro; Tadao Wakabayashi
- Written by: Akira Adachi
- Studio: Dai'ichi Dōga
- Licensed by: NA: Discotek Media
- Original network: FNS (Fuji TV)
- Original run: 7 October 1968 – 31 March 1969
- Episodes: 26
- Anime television series
- Directed by: Hiroshi Harada
- Written by: Junki Takegami
- Studio: Studio Comet
- Original network: Animax, Tokyo MX
- Original run: 1 April 2006 – 7 October 2006
- Episodes: 26
- Television drama
- Directed by: Shunsuke Kariyama; Noriyoshi Sakuma
- Written by: Masafumi Nishida
- Studio: Nippon Television
- Original network: NTV
- Original run: October 22, 2011 – December 24, 2011
- Episodes: 10
- Live-action film
- Directed by: Shunsuke Kariyama
- Produced by: Hidehiro Kawano
- Written by: Masafumi Nishida
- Studio: Toho
- Released: December 15, 2012
- Runtime: 124 minutes
- Anime television series

BEM
- Directed by: Yoshinori Odaka
- Written by: Atsuhiro Tomioka
- Music by: Soil & Pimp Sessions; Michiru
- Studio: LandQ Studios
- Licensed by: Funimation
- Original network: TV Tokyo, TVA, TVO
- Original run: July 14, 2019 – October 13, 2019
- Episodes: 12
- Live-action film

Yokai Ningen Bela
- Directed by: Tsutomu Hanabusa
- Written by: Daisuke Hozaka
- Music by: Minami Nozaki
- Studio: ADK Emotions
- Released: September 11, 2020
- Anime film
- BEM: Become Human (2020)
- icon

Humanoid Monster Bem (Japanese: 妖怪人間ベム, Hepburn: Yōkai Ningen Bemu) is a 26-episode Japanese anime television series, which first aired on Fuji TV between October 7, 1968, and March 31, 1969, on its 19:30–20:00 timeslot.

The series was later remade into a second anime television series, which premiered in April 2006 in Japan on Animax, featuring a new cast, with a total of 26 episodes also produced.

A live-action television drama adaptation premiered on NTV on October 22, 2011. A film was released on December 15, 2012.

For the series' 50th anniversary, a third anime television series adaptation titled BEM was confirmed to be in production. The third series aired from July 14 to October 13, 2019. A new film titled BEM: Become Human, was released on October 2, 2020. It streamed on Funimation's website on October 29, 2020.

A spin-off live-action film Yokai Ningen Bela was released on September 11, 2020.

== Plot ==
The plot of the series revolves around three yokai (supernatural creatures), Bem, Bela and Belo, who arrive at a large coastal city and come across an evil atmosphere, which was brought about by immoral behavior by humans and mischief caused by monsters and yokai. They therefore decide to stay in the city, fighting against other monsters and yokai which attack humans, making a few friends along the way. Even though the three yokai are often abused and discriminated against by other human beings due to their appearance, they still strive in protecting the human populace of the city from other monsters, one day hoping to become human beings in return for their good actions.

== Characters ==
Bem (ベム)
Voiced by: Kiyoshi Kobayashi (1968 series), Kazuhiko Inoue (2006 series), Katsuyuki Konishi (2019 series) (Japanese); Gabe Kunda (2019 series) (English)
Played by: Kazuya Kamenashi
The oldest looking of the trio is the leader and protagonist. He uses a walking stick as a weapon in human form.
Bela (ベラ)
Voiced by: Hiroko Mori (1968 series), Kaori Yamagata (2006 series), M.A.O (2019 series) (Japanese); Dani Chambers (2019 series) (English)
Played by: Anne Watanabe
The only female in the group and the most bad-tempered of the trio. She uses a whip as a weapon in human form.
Belo (ベロ)
Voiced by: Mari Shimizu (1968 series), Ai Horanai (2006 series), Kensho Ono (2019 series) (Japanese); Aaron Dismuke (2019 series) (English)
Played by: Fuku Suzuki
The youngest looking and the most naive of the trio. He is the only one that does not use a weapon in human form.

== Staff ==
=== Original series ===
- Original Concept: Akira Adachi
- Screenplay: Akira Adachi
- Directors: Noburo Ishiguro, Tadao Wakabayashi
- Art: Shin Morikawa
- Production: Daiichi Doga (later incorporated into ADK)

==== Cast ====
- Bem: Kiyoshi Kobayashi
- Bela: Hiroko Mori
- Belo: Mari Shimizu
- Opening Narration: Tatsuya Jo, Issei Futamata (Part 2)

==== Theme songs ====
- Opening: "Humanoid Monster Bemu" (妖怪人間ベム) (lyrics: Daiichi Doga, composition and arrangement: Seishi Tanaka; performance: Honey Nights)
- Ending: "Barro wa Tomodachi" (ベロは友だち, Bero wa Tomodachi; lit. Bero is a Friend) (lyrics: Daiichi Doga Bungei-bu, composition and arrangement: Masahiro Uno, performance: Toshiko Yamada, Otowa Yurikago Kai, Gekidan Komadori)

=== 2006 remake ===
- Original Concept: Asatsu DK
- Director: Hiroshi Harada
- Series Composition: Junki Takegami
- Character Design: Kazuhiko Shibuya
- Chief Animation Director: Takeshi Yamazaki
- Yokai Design Creator: Naoki Ogiwara
- Art Directors: Shō Tensui, Tsutomu Nishikura, Shinji Kawai
- Primary Background Artist: Kazue Itō
- Color Settings: Miharu Sakai
- Director of Photography: Tomofumi Fujita
- Editing: Yumiko Nakaba, Hideaki Murai (Okayasu Promotion)
- Sound Director: Fusanobu Fujiyama
- Sound Supervision: Takanori Ebina
- Music: Takehiko Gokita
- Animation Production: Studio Comet
- Production: NAS
- Producers: NAS, Sony Pictures Entertainment, avex entertainment, Studio Comet

==== Cast ====
- Bem: Kazuhiko Inoue
- Bela: Kaori Yamagata
- Belo: Ai Horanai
- Kira Hyuga: Yūna Inamura
- Sora Kaido: Naoya Iwahashi
- Mitsuki Kisaragi: Minori Chihara
- Genpaku Hyuga: Masami Iwasaki
- Urara Hyuga: Mie Sonozaki
- Riku Kaido: Ryō Naitō
- Umi Kaido: Miki Nagasawa
- Ryoko Kisaragi: Yuriko Fuchizaki
- Yuzo Mikami: Manabu Murashi
- Hitoshi Tamugenro: Hirofumi Nojima
- Imp: Mitsuo Iwata
- Dana O'Shee: Rokuro Naya
- Doppleganger: Hiroyuki Miyasako
- Narration: Mizuho Suzuki

==== Theme songs ====
- Opening: "Justice of darkness ~theme of Humanoid Monster Bemu" (Justice of darkness ～妖怪人間ベムのテーマ, Justice of darkness ~ Humanoid Monster Bemu no tēma) (Performance: Hiroshi Kitadani (Bem = Kazuhiko Inoue))
- Ending: "Hachigatsu no Eien" (8月の永遠) (Performance: Minako Yoshida)

=== 2019 anime ===
- Original Story: ADK Emotions
- Director: Yoshinori Odaka
- Series Composition: Atsuhiro Tomioka
- Original Character Design: Range Murata
- Character Design: Masakazu Sunagawa
- Music Composer: Soil & "Pimp" Sessions, Michiru
- Music Producer: Flying Dog
- Animation Production: LandQ Studios
- Planning Production: NAS
- Project Collaborator: Production I.G
- Production: BEM Production Committee

==== Cast ====
- Bem: Katsuyuki Konishi/Gabe Kunda
- Bela: M.A.O/Dani Chambers
- Belo: Kensho Ono/Aaron Dismuke
- Mysterious Lady: Maaya Sakamoto/Colleen Clinkenbeard
- Joel Woods: Kenji Nomura/Jason Douglas
- Sonia Summers: Maaya Uchida/Felecia Angelle
- Dr. Recycle: Junichi Suwabe/Daman Mills
- Daryl Bryson: Soma Saito/Dallas Reid
- Roddy Walker: Koutaro Nishiyama/Stephen Fu
- Helmut Felt: Daisuke Ono/Christopher Wehkamp
- Julia Bush: Sayaka Oohara/Jamie Marchi

==== Theme songs ====
- Opening: "Uchū no Kioku" (Performance: Maaya Sakamoto)
- Ending: "Iruimi" (Performance: JUNNA)

=== 2020 film ===
- Original story: ADK Emotions
- Director: Hiroshi Ikehata
- Series Composition: Atsuhiro Tomioka
- Original Character Design: Range Murata
- Character Design: Mino Matsumoto
- Animation Production: Production I.G

==== Cast ====
- Bem: Katsuyuki Konishi/Gabe Kunda
- Bela: M.A.O/Dani Chambers
- Belo: Kensho Ono/Aaron Dismuke
- Burgess: Toshiya Miyata/Ryan Colt Levy
- Manstoll: Kōichi Yamadera/Jason Liebrecht
- Emma: Nana Mizuki/Bryn Apprill
- Draco: Wataru Takagi/Michael Schwalbe
- Greta: Shizuka Itō/Elizabeth Maxwell

== Anime ==
Funimation has licensed the 2019 series for a simuldub. Due to the Kyoto Animation arson attack on July 18, 2019, Episode 4, which was originally scheduled to air on August 4, 2019, was postponed to August 18, 2019.

No.	Title	Original release date
1	"Water"	July 14, 2019
2	"Liar"	July 21, 2019
3	"Shadow"	July 28, 2019
4	"Lightning"	August 18, 2019
5	"Sweeper"	August 25, 2019
6	"Gravity"	September 1, 2019
7	"Chimera"	September 8, 2019
8	"Noise"	September 15, 2019
9	"Falling"	September 22, 2019
10	"Betrayal"	September 29, 2019
11	"Judgement"	October 6, 2019
12	"Wishing to become human someday"	October 13, 2019

== Reception ==
The live-action film grossed US$11.5 million in Japan.
