= BEM: Become Human =

2020 film by Hiroshi Ikehata

- Kanji: 劇場版 BEM 〜BECOME HUMAN〜
- Revised Hepburn: Gekijōban Bemu ~Bekōmu Hyūman~
- Directed by: Hiroshi Ikehata
- Screenplay by: Atsuhiro Tomioka
- Based on: Humanoid Monster Bem by ADK Emotions
- Produced by: Fumihiro Ozawa; Kana Yajima; Makoto Hijikata; Masao Fukuda; Tetsuya Kinoshita
- Starring: Katsuyuki Konishi; M.A.O.; Kensho Ono; Maaya Uchida; Kenji Nomura; Junichi Suwabe; Wataru Takagi; Shizuka Itō; Nana Mizuki; Toshiya Miyata; Koichi Yamadera
- Edited by: Yoshinori Murakami
- Music by: Soil & "Pimp" Sessions; Michiru
- Production company: Production I.G
- Distributed by: The Klockworx Co., Ltd.
- Release date: October 2, 2020
- Running time: 90 minutes
- Country: Japan
- Language: Japanese

BEM: Become Human (Note: Japanese: 劇場版 BEM 〜BECOME HUMAN〜, Hepburn: Gekijōban Bemu ~Bekōmu Hyūman~; lit. "Theatrical Feature BEM: Become Human") is a 2020 Japanese animated horror adventure film directed by Hiroshi Ikehata and written by Atsuhiro Tomioka; the film is based on the Humanoid Monster Bem franchise by ADK Emotions. Produced by Production I.G and distributed by The KlockWorx, the story takes place after the events of the 2019 anime television series, as Sonia Summers searches for Bem, Bela, and Belo after they have disappeared. The film stars the voices of Katsuyuki Konishi, M.A.O., Kensho Ono, Maaya Uchida, Kenji Nomura, Junichi Suwabe, Wataru Takagi, Shizuka Itō, Nana Mizuki, Toshiya Miyata and Koichi Yamadera. The film was released in Japan on October 2, 2020.

Funimation licensed the film, which was released on its website on October 29, 2020.

== Synopsis ==
Two years after Bem, Bela, and Belo defeated Vega, Sonia Summers is on a search for the three. On Doracho Chemicals, a city within an island, she stumbles upon a man named Belm that bears a similar resemblance to Bem, with Bela and Belo being separated and doing their own things.

== Voice cast ==
| Character | Japanese voice cast | English voice cast |
|---|---|---|
| Bem/Belm | Katsuyuki Konishi | Gabe Kunda |
| Bela | M.A.O. | Dani Chambers |
| Belo | Kensho Ono | Aaron Dismuke |
| Sonia Summers | Maaya Uchida | Felecia Angelle |
| Emma Eisberg | Nana Mizuki | Bryn Apprill |
| Greta Reed | Shizuka Itō | Elizabeth Maxwell |
| Lorezo Nepmuceno Draco | Wataru Takagi | Michael Schwalbe |
| Dr. Recycle | Junichi Suwabe | Daman Mills |
| Joel Woods | Kenji Nomura | Jason Douglas |
| Burgess | Toshiya Miyata | Ryan Colt Levy |
| Manstoll | Koichi Yamadera | Jason Liebrecht |

== Production ==
In June 2020, it was announced that a film adaptation of the Humanoid Monster Bem anime series was in the works, with the key staff and cast members from the 2019 television series returning to their respective positions: Hiroshi Ikehata is directing the film, with Atsuhiro Tomioka providing the screenplay and Miho Matsumoto providing the character designs, while Production I.G is solely handling the animation production. That same month, it was announced that Kis-My-Ft2 boyband member Toshiya Miyata was cast as Burgess. Voice actors Nana Mizuki, Shizuka Itō, Koichi Yamadera, and Wataru Takagi were cast as new characters the following month. J-Pop singer Rib provided the theme song for the film, titled "unforever."

== Release ==
The film was released in theaters in Japan on October 2, 2020. The film was licensed by Funimation and streamed on its website in the United States, Canada, the United Kingdom, and Ireland on October 29, 2020.

== Reception ==
=== Critical reception ===
Theron Martin of Anime News Network gave the film a solid B rating and stated, "While I might have liked to see the main villain and his motives developed a little more, the movie is generally paced well and fully completes its intended story."
