= Romelia War Chronicle =

Japanese light novel series

- Romelia War Chronicle: The Count's Daughter Rallies an Army in the Wake of Mankind's Victory
- First light novel volume cover, featuring Romelia von Graham

ロメリア戦記 ～魔王を倒した後も人類やばそうだから軍隊組織した～ (Romeria Senki: Maō o Taoshita Ato mo Jinrui Yabasō Dakara Guntai Soshiki Shita)
- Genre: Fantasy, military
- Novel series
- Written by: Ryō Ariyama
- Published by: Shōsetsuka ni Narō
- Original run: August 26, 2019 – present
- Light novel
- Written by: Ryō Ariyama
- Illustrated by: Kodama (volume 1); Ryō Kamito (from volume 2)
- Published by: Shogakukan
- Imprint: Gagaga Books
- Original run: June 19, 2020 – October 16, 2026
- Volumes: 6 + 2 side story volume
- Manga
- Written by: Ryō Ariyama
- Illustrated by: Ryō Kamito
- Published by: Mag Garden
- English publisher: NA: Seven Seas Entertainment
- Imprint: Blade Comics
- Magazine: Manga Doa
- Original run: April 23, 2021 – present
- Volumes: 6
- Anime television series
- Directed by: Kōji Saitō (Note: Director Hiroshi Shirai was initially credited as the director (監督) in promotional videos and material, but was replaced by Kouji Saitou (齊藤浩二) credited as series director (シリーズディレクター) in the credits and on the official website. The storyboards for episodes 1 and 3 are also pseudonymously credited to Graphinica, which Shirai is an employee of.)
- Written by: Aya Satsuki
- Music by: Kohta Yamamoto
- Studio: Atra
- Licensed by: Crunchyroll
- Original network: Tokyo MX, BS11, SUN, KBS Kyoto, CBC
- Original run: October 5, 2026 – present
- Episodes: 24
- icon

Romelia War Chronicle: The Count's Daughter Rallies an Army in the Wake of Mankind's Victory (Japanese: ロメリア戦記 ～魔王を倒した後も人類やばそうだから軍隊組織した～, Hepburn: Romeria Senki: Maō o Taoshita Ato mo Jinrui Yabasō Dakara Guntai Soshiki Shita; 'A History of the Romelia: Even After Defeating the Demon King, Humanity Seemed to Be in Trouble so We Organized an Army') is a Japanese light novel series written by Ryō Ariyama and illustrated by Kodama (first volume) and Ryō Kamito (from second volume).

The series began serialization online in August 2019 on the user-generated novel publishing website Shōsetsuka ni Narō, before later being acquired and published by Shogakukan under their Gagaga Books imprint in six volumes and two side story volumes from June 2020 to October 2026. A manga adaptation with art by Kamito is serialized via the Manga Doa app and is published by Mag Garden since April 2021. An anime television series adaptation produced by Atra premiered its first cours in October 2026, with the second cours set to premiere in April 2027.

== Plot ==
After Prince Henri and Countess Romelia defeated the demon lord, Henri broke their engagement, causing Romelia to be abandoned by her companions, while Henri is celebrated as a hero. However, remnants of the demon lord's army still remain and some prisoners still need to be rescued. So, despite losing her army, Romelia, with the skills she gained from the campaign, sets out to save them and eliminate the remaining threats to the kingdom.

== Characters ==
Romelia von Graham (ロメリア・フォン・グラハム, Romeria fon Gurahamu)
Voiced by: Yuna Nemoto
Al (アル, Aru)
Voiced by: Jin Ogasawara
Ray (レイ, Rei)
Voiced by: Tomohiro Ōno
Henri Lleus Lionel (アンリ・レウス・ライオネル, Anri Reusu Raioneru)
Voiced by: Yūya Hirose
Elizabeth (エリザベート, Erizabēto)
Voiced by: Sayaka Senbongi
Ekaterina (エカテリーナ, Ekaterīna)
Voiced by: Mariya Ise
Ryoki (リョキ)
Voiced by: Asaka
Gran (グラン, Guran)
Voiced by: Shōya Chiba
Ragn (ラグン, Ragun)
Voiced by: Gakuto Kajiwara
Kyle (カイル, Kairu)
Voiced by: Shun Horie
Otto (オットー, Ottō)
Voiced by: Ryunosuke Watanuki
Hans (ハンス, Hansu)
Voiced by: Hiromichi Tezuka
Glein (グレイン, Gurein)
Voiced by: Tomohiro Yamaguchi
Jinni (ジニ, Jini)
Voiced by: Ryūichi Hirose
Tarth (タース, Tāsu)
Voiced by: Kenta Hosoda
Say (セイ, Sei)
Voiced by: Tasuku Kaito
Zeze (ゼゼ)
Voiced by: Rikuya Yasuda
Bray (ブライ, Burai)
Voiced by: Hiroki Matsukawa
Ben (ベン)
Voiced by: Taiki Yamashita
Gatt (ガット, Gatto)
Voiced by: Sōhei Horikane
Rhett (レット, Retto)
Voiced by: Naoki Sakurai
Shuro (シュロー, Shurō)
Voiced by: Mizuki Ishii
Merrill (メリル, Meriru)
Voiced by: Hayato Kimura
Borel (ボレル, Boreru)
Voiced by: Shuntaro Hara
Miitya (ミーチャ, Mīcha)
Voiced by: Hiromu Mineta

== Media ==
=== Light novel ===
Written by Ryō Ariyama, Romelia War Chronicle: The Count's Daughter Rallies an Army in the Wake of Mankind's Victory began serialization on the user-generated web novel publishing site Shōsetsuka ni Narō on August 26, 2019. The series was later acquired and published by Shogakukan under their Gagaga Books light novel imprint with six volumes and a side story volume with illustrations by Kodama and Ryō Kamito from June 19, 2020, to November 18, 2025. A second side story volume was released on October 16, 2026.

No.	Release date	ISBN
1	June 19, 2020	978-4-09-461138-0
2	November 19, 2020	978-4-09-461147-2
3	May 19, 2021	978-4-09-461150-2
4	April 20, 2022	978-4-09-461160-1
SS1	July 19, 2023 (eBook)	—
5	September 18, 2024	978-4-09-461174-8
6	November 18, 2025	978-4-09-461193-9
SS2	October 16, 2026	978-4-09-461203-5

=== Manga ===
A manga adaptation illustrated by Kamito began serialization on the Manga Doa app on April 23, 2021, with its chapters collected and published by Mag Garden into six tankōbon volumes as of October 2026.

In March 2025, Seven Seas Entertainment announced that they had licensed the manga for English publication, with the first volume set to release in January 2026.

No.	Original release date	Original ISBN	English release date	English ISBN
1	October 8, 2021	978-4-8000-1137-4	January 13, 2026	979-8-89561-541-6
2	April 7, 2022	978-4-8000-1192-3	April 28, 2026	979-8-89561-542-3
3	July 10, 2023	978-4-8000-1350-7	August 11, 2026	979-8-89561-543-0
4	September 10, 2024	978-4-8000-1495-5	December 1, 2026	979-8-89561-544-7
5	November 10, 2025	978-4-8000-1659-1	April 6, 2027	979-8-89863-326-4
6	October 8, 2026	978-4-8000-1819-9	—	—

=== Anime ===
An anime adaptation was announced on September 10, 2024, which was later revealed to be a television series that is produced by Atra and directed by Kōji Saitō, with series composition handled by Aya Satsuki, characters designed by Yoshiko Saitō and Yūta Ōtaka, and music composed by Kohta Yamamoto. The first cours premiered on October 5, 2026, on Tokyo MX and other networks. The second cours is set to premiere in April 2027. For the first cours, the opening theme song is "Akatsuki ni Naru" (暁に鳴る; 'Daybreak Resounds'), performed by Chogakusei, and the ending theme song is "Nightfall", performed by Kohta Yamamoto featuring Maika Loubté. For the second cours, the ending theme song will be performed by Hiro Shimono. Crunchyroll is streaming the series.

==== Episodes ====
No.	Title	Directed by (Note: Production staff information is taken from the ending credits of each episode.)	Written by	Storyboarded by	Original release date (Note: Episodes are released on Prime Video, U-NEXT and Crunchyroll 2 days before their televised airings.)
1	"The Girl Named Romelia"; Transliteration: "Romeria to Iu Shōjo" (Japanese: ロメリアという少女)	Takatsuki Azuma & Taichi Shinko	Aya Satsuki	Graphinica	October 5, 2026
After defeating the Demon Lord, Prince Henri breaks his engagement with his party member Lady Romelia, claiming she was useless in combat. Romelia quietly informs the King of the breakup and departs, keeping only the contents of her bag as a reward. At home, her mother is furious over the engagament scandal, but her father, Count Graham, is more sympathetic. Romelia attempts to sell a piece of ore from the demon continent to Minervo of the Sella Merchant Company. When Minervo tries to cheat her, she throws him out, knowing the chunk is actually the priceless "Dragonspit Incense." President Sella arrives to apologize for his son's dishonesty and offers full value. Romelia gifts the incense to her father so Sella must buy it from him, instantly solving her family's financial troubles. In return, Romelia asks only for a jar of magic paint and announces her plan to move to the city of Cashu. Accompanied by her elderly maid Cairo, Romelia buys new gear and bids farewell to her mother, who remains bitter despite their newfound wealth. As they leave, Cairo reveals that Prince Henri has already proposed to Elizabeth, their party's healer, now recognized by the Salvation Church as a Healer Saint.
2	"Fortress Takeover"; Transliteration: "Toride Kōryaku Kaishi" (Japanese: 砦攻略開始)	Takatsuki Azuma & Taichi Shinko	Aya Satsuki	Ryūta Ono	October 12, 2026
Romelia and Cairo arrive in Cashu and head to the fortress town Carolus. They meet with Administrator Serbeck and request a demon extermination team. While seeming loyal to her father, Serbeck is uninterested in following Romelia's orders, so he gives her his most inexperienced soldiers, hoping Romelia gets herself killed. The soldiers are surprised when Romelia greets them with plans to wipe out the demons in her father's lands Henri did not bother with. Captain Al asks why they cannot just wait for the royal army to do it. Romelia reveals the army prioritises protecting cities and trade routes, so small territories like Cashu must protect themselves. Romelia observes their routine training and deems them fit for combat, though the soldiers are concerned she might be inexperienced commanding men in battle. Romelia requests better armour for the men, and when Serbeck protests she reveals she has already studied his storehouse inventory and knows he has spare armour. Serbeck is privately furious as he had planned to sell the armour for his own profit. His subordinate is curious Romelia is targeting a pack of intelligent daemonkeys, though Serbeck is confident Romelia will soon be dead. Al decides if Romelia is incompetent he will abandon her to die and prioritise saving his men.
3	"The Name of that Miracle"; Transliteration: "Sono Kiseki no na wa" (Japanese: その奇跡の名は)	Unknown	Unknown	TBA	October 19, 2026
Romelia and her men arrive at a fort under attack by Daemonkeys. They note that while courageous, Romelia lacks sword skill. Al and Ray realize her tactical genius compensates for this as she manoeuvres the monsters directly into her soldiers' line of fire. Taking command, she replaces Ray as unit leader for faltering and scolds Al for fighting on the frontline instead of directing his men. After securing victory, Romelia forces Ray to execute an injured Daemonkey, warning that if he cannot execute a monster that slaughtered humans, he has no future as a soldier. Following the battle, the villagers throw a feast where Romelia awards bonuses, earning Al’s trust, though a deeply troubled Ray admits to Al that he feels ashamed for failing to kill any Daemonkeys in battle. Elsewhere, Elisabeth revels in her authority as Henri’s fiancée while her father, Cardinal Pharmine, schemes to make her Queen as quickly as possible. By manipulating the terminally ill King into sending his healer to support Henri in battle, Pharmine has ensured the King will die of natural causes faster than normal. Meanwhile, Lord Gallios, brother of the slain Demon King, learns of Henri’s role in his brother's death and seeks revenge.
4	"The Troubles of a Young Man"; Transliteration: "Seinen no Kunō" (Japanese: 青年の苦悩)	TBA	TBA	TBA	October 26, 2026
Using the magic paint she acquired, Romelia tests the men for magical aptitude. Al proves to have fire magic while Ray possesses wind magic. Serbeck grows angrier as Romelia continues saving villages and requesting more supplies. Ray puts himself in danger against a boar demon, requiring Al and others to save him. Romelia scolds him for disobeying orders but praises twins Gran and Ragn for their dual spear technique, Otto for his strength and Kyle for his tracking skills. Romelia asks Al about Ray and learns Ray is desperate to be useful. As they leave the next morning, children thank Ray for repairing their house from the boar damage. Al asks Romelia how Ray might train his magic and is disappointed that learning requires time, an instructor and money. Following rumours of a demon bear, the unit encounters a demon soldier that targets Romelia. Ray rushes forward recklessly again, but his horse is killed and Al is grievously injured saving him. Four more soldiers appear, so Romelia has the unit throw all their magic bombs at once. Serbeck is thrilled to hear Romelia's unit disappeared, and gleefully refuses to send a search party, claiming he cannot risk more soldiers' lives.
5	"The Line Between Courage and Recklessness"; Transliteration: "Yūki to Mubō no Kyōkaisen" (Japanese: 勇気と無謀の境界線)	TBA	TBA	TBA	November 2, 2026
In the past, Henri and Romelia saved a village, but Henri was injured. Pharmine sent Elisabeth to heal him and at first Henri refused to be manipulated by Pharmine, but it was Romelia that convinced him their party needed a healer. In the present, Romelia explains the demons are reconnaissance operatives, scouting routes for a larger invasion force, so it is essential they be killed before they can report back to their army. Romelia sets a trap on a narrow path with a high cliff on one side, putting Ray on the front line. Ray assumes she means for him to die, but Romelia insists she intends for them all to survive by being smart and trusting each other. The demons appear but outmanoeuvre Romelia by approaching from two sides while their leader drops on them from above. In the chaos, Al and Ray take command, sending men to both sides while they confront the demon leader. By instinct, Al and Ray both unlock their magic and begin overwhelming the leader. The demons try to come to his aid but are blocked by Romelia's men and then outflanked by Kyle, Otto, Gran and Ragn who stab them in the back. Alone, the leader tries to rush Romelia, but is burned to ashes by Al. Romelia passes out from relief and physical exhaustion.
6	"Each of Their Resolves"; Transliteration: "Sorezore no Kakugo" (Japanese: それぞれの覚悟)	TBA	TBA	TBA	November 9, 2026
Elisabeth dreams of the war, remembering how Romelia’s intelligence allowed her to predict future events with supernatural accuracy. Upon waking, Elisabeth learns Romelia is missing, but remains confident she is alive. Meanwhile, Romelia is secretly nursing her men in a Millet hospital while they laugh over news of their reported deaths. After Romelia performs surgery on Ray and Al, both men recover. When Romelia privately asks if they would back her or Sorbeck in a conflict, both choose her without hesitation. To evaluate the Yalmark Merchant Association, Romelia disguises herself as a maid while twin brothers Gran and Ragn pose as nobles. Romelia is impressed by the head clerk, Seryure, for his sharp business mind and mentorship of skilled young artisans. Their return journey is cut short when bandits capture them, planning to ransom the "nobles" and enslave the "maid." When Gran is injured, a panicked Ragn fears losing his identity without his brother. Romelia escapes and consoles him, revealing she could always tell the twins apart, a trait only their mother shared. After reviving Gran, they locate a cache of Cashu weapons and break free. Although bandit leaders recapture Romelia, her men launch a surprise attack to rescue her. Sorbeck's subordinate, Nikolai, brings Romelia evidence she requested, but she lets him decide what to do with it.
7	"Musical Chairs"; Transliteration: "Isu-tori Yūgi" (Japanese: 椅子取り遊戯)	TBA	TBA	TBA	November 16, 2026
In the past, Romelia orchestrated Henri's victory against a giant crab demon alongside Elisabeth, Ryoki, and Ekaterina. However, she felt her role as a strategist isolated her from the comradeship the others forged in battle. Afterward, an overconfident Henri hired a merchant to transport them, ignoring Romelia's warnings the merchant overloaded his ship with cargo, causing it to sink and kill almost everyone aboard. In the present, Romelia and her men return to Carolus with Nikolai's evidence proving Serbeck stole tax money and sold army equipment to bandits. Serbeck sends guards to kill her, but Romelia’s battle-hardened men easily defeat them. Following Serbeck's arrest for treason, Romelia becomes Administrator and discovers Carolus is nearly bankrupt. To save their finances, she proposes capturing Guillier Gorge from native Raptor demons to mine a rumoured gold seam. The Magistrates Council rejects her plan, citing the deaths of previous soldiers sent up there. After investigating Guillier's records with Financial Magistrate Mary and Troop Magistrate Dars, Romelia discovers Serbeck forced Dars and Tax Magistrate Hyde to send untrained soldiers from peasant families to die at Guillier just to avoid paying to feed them. Romelia volunteers to conquer Guillier using her own well-trained men, who enthusiastically agree to go. Recalling the sinking ship, Romelia warns her men against letting confidence become the kind of arrogance that will get them killed.
8	"Goal"; Transliteration: "Mezasu Saki" (Japanese: 目指す先)	TBA	TBA	TBA	November 23, 2026
In the past, Romelia dragged Henri ashore at an unknown coastal inlet, saving his life, but while she searched for Ryoki and Ekaterina, Elisabeth stole the credit for saving Henri. In the present, Elisabeth learns Henri is deployed against the demon army at the Dacan Plains. Romelia instructs Supply Magistrate Graves on maintaining supply lines before visiting Seryure, who is surprised the new Carolus Administrator is the maid he previously met. Romelia seeks Seryure's investment to transform Carolus into a trade capital by capturing Guillier and its gold seam. Although the King holds the mining rights, Romelia plans to profit by building and supplying the mining town. When Seryure worries about finding no gold, Romelia reveals her true objective: right next to Guillier is the hidden ocean inlet where she once rescued Henri, which is ideal for a shipping port. Because mountainous terrain leaves the Lionel Kingdom landlocked, securing a port and a safe trade route through a Raptor-free Guillier Gorge would revolutionize the economy. Even without finding gold, the port's value is incalculable; the mining town would become a merchant hospitality hub and Cashu would become a trade capital supplying the entire continent. Seryure agrees to fund the Raptor extermination, though he will only finance town and port construction if gold is found. Romelia's men encounter Raptors in Guillier. General Galle learns Henri's location, so he splits his army to attack both Dacan and the fort held by Henri's subordinate, General Zarya.

== Reception ==
By September 2024, the series had over 400,000 copies in circulation.
