= Atsuhiro Tomioka =

Japanese anime and tokusatsu drama screenwriter

- 冨岡 淳広
- Born: November 25, 1967 (age 58); Niigata Prefecture, Japan
- Occupation: Screenwriter

Atsuhiro Tomioka (冨岡 淳広, Tomioka Atsuhiro; born November 25, 1967) is a Japanese anime and tokusatsu screenwriter. He is a member of the Writers Guild of Japan.

== Works ==
=== Anime television series ===
- Brave Exkaiser (1990–1991) - Screenplay
- The Brave of Sun Fighbird (1991–1992) - Screenplay
- Mojacko (1995–1997) - Screenplay
- Eat-Man (1997) - Screenplay
- Pokémon (1997–2002) - Screenplay
- Berserk (1997) - Screenplay
- Next Senki Ehrgeiz (1997) - Series Composition, Screenplay
- Oh My Goddess! The Adventures of Mini-Goddess (1998–1999) - Screenplay
- AWOL -Absent Without Leave- (1998) - Series Composition, Screenplay
- You`re Under Arrest! Mini Specials (1999) - Screenplay
- Gokudo the Adventurer (1999) - Series Composition, Screenplay
- Soul Hunter (1999) - Screenplay
- Jibaku-kun: Twelve Worlds Story (1999–2000) - Series Composition, Screenplay
- One Piece (1999–present) - Screenplay
- Bikkuriman 2000 (1999–2001) - Series Composition, Screenplay
- Hamtaro (2000–2006) - Screenplay
- Vandread (2000) - Series Composition, Screenplay
- Baki the Grappler (2001) - Series Composition, Screenplay
- Magical Meow Meow Taruto (2001) - Screenplay
- Final Fantasy: Unlimited (2001–2002) - Series Composition, Screenplay
- Hikaru no Go (2001–2003) - Screenplay
- The Prince of Tennis (2001–2005) - Series Composition (episodes 76–101), Screenplay
- Vandread: The Second Stage (2001–2002) - Series Composition, Screenplay
- Pokémon: The Legend of Thunder (TV Special) (2001) - Screenplay
- Gravion (2002) - Screenplay
- Pokémon the Series: Advanced (2002–2006) - Screenplay
- Croket! (2003–2005) - Series Composition, Screenplay
- E's Otherwise (2003) - Screenplay
- Last Exile (2003) - Screenplay
- Green Green (2003) - Series Composition, Screenplay
- Chrono Crusade (2003–2004) - Series Composition, Screenplay
- Monkey Turn / Monkey Turn V (2004) - Series Composition, Screenplay
- Samurai 7 (2004) - Series Composition, Screenplay
- Gallery Fake (2005) - Screenplay
- Nepos Napos (2005) - Screenplay
- Trinity Blood (2005) - Series Composition, Screenplay
- Glass Fleet (2006) - Screenplay
- Makai Senki Disgaea (2006) - Series Composition, Screenplay
- The Good Witch of the West (2006) - Series Composition, Screenplay
- Ray the Animation (2006) - Series Composition, Screenplay
- Pokémon the Series: Diamond and Pearl (2006–2010) - Series Composition, Screenplay
- Pumpkin Scissors (2006–2007) - Series Composition, Screenplay
- Sugarbunnies (2007) - Screenplay
- Zombie-Loan (2007) - Series Composition, Screenplay
- Prism Ark (2007) - Screenplay
- Special A (2008) - Screenplay
- Sisters of Wellber Zwei (2008) - Screenplay
- Glass Maiden (2008) - Series Composition, Screenplay
- Yu-Gi-Oh! 5D's (2008–2011) - Series Composition (episodes 1–26), Screenplay
- Inazuma Eleven (2008–2011) - Series Composition, Screenplay, Song Lyrics
- Battle Spirits: Shounen Gekiha Dan (2009–2010) - Series Composition, Screenplay
- Fairy Tail (2009–2016) - Screenplay
- Battle Spirits: Brave (2010–2011) - Series Composition, Screenplay
- Pokémon the Series: Black & White (2010–2013) - Series Composition, Screenplay
- Infinite Stratos (2011) - Screenplay
- Little Battlers Experience (2011–2012) - Series Composition, Screenplay
- Inazuma Eleven GO (2011–2012) - Series Composition, Screenplay, Song Lyrics
- Battle Spirits: Heroes (2011–2012) - Series Composition, Screenplay
- Little Battlers eXperience W (2012–2013) - Series Composition, Screenplay
- Inazuma Eleven GO: Chrono Stone (2012–2013) - Series Composition, Screenplay
- Zetman (2012) - Series Composition, Screenplay
- Bakumatsu Gijinden Roman (2013) - Screenplay
- Battle Spirits: Sword Eyes (2012–2013) - Series Composition, Screenplay
- Danball Senki Wars (2013) - Series Composition, Screenplay
- Tanken Driland: 1000 Nen no Mahou (2013–2014) - Series Composition, Screenplay
- Inazuma Eleven GO: Galaxy (2013–2014) - Series Composition, Screenplay
- Battle Spirits: Saikyou Ginga Ultimate Zero (2013–2014) - Series Composition, Screenplay
- Pokémon the Series: XY (2013–2015) - Series Composition, Screenplay
- Blade & Soul (2014) - Series Composition, Screenplay
- Hero Bank (2014–2015) - Series Composition, Screenplay
- The Kindaichi Case Files R (2014) - Screenplay
- Tribe Cool Crew (2014–2015) - Series Composition, Screenplay
- Samurai Warriors (2015) - Screenplay
- Dragon Ball Super (2015–2018) - Screenplay
- Brave Beats (2015–2016) - Series Composition, Screenplay
- The Case File of Young Kindaichi Returns (2015–2016) - Screenplay
- Pokémon the Series: XYZ (2015–2016) - Series Composition, Screenplay
- Beyblade Burst (2016–2017) - Screenplay
- Ace Attorney (2016) - Series Composition, Screenplay
- Heybot! (2016–2017) - Series Composition, Screenplay
- Pokémon the Series: Sun & Moon (2016–2019) - Screenplay
- Atom: The Beginning (2017) - Screenplay
- Beyblade Burst Evolution (2017–2018) - Screenplay
- 18if (2017) - Series Composition, Screenplay
- Captain Tsubasa (2018–2019) - Series Composition, Screenplay
- Future Card Buddyfight X: All-Star Fight (2018) - Screenplay
- Ace Attorney Season 2 (2018–2019) - Series Composition, Screenplay
- Mix: Meisei Story (2019) - Series Composition, Screenplay
- BEM (2019) - Series Composition, Screenplay
- Pokémon Journeys: The Series (2019–2022) - Screenplay
- Digimon Adventure (2020–2021) - Series Composition, Screenplay
- Digimon Ghost Game (2021–2023) - Screenplay
- Motto! Majime ni Fumajime Kaiketsu Zorori (2020–2022) - Series Composition, Screenplay
- Fuuto PI (2022) - Screenplay
- Pokémon: To Be a Pokémon Master (2023) - Series Composition, Screenplay
- Mix: Meisei Story 2nd Season - Our Second Summer, Beyond the Sky (2023) - Series Composition, Screenplay
- Captain Tsubasa: Junior Youth Arc (2023–2024) - Series Composition, Screenplay
- The Red Ranger Becomes an Adventurer in Another World (2025) - Series Composition
- Arcanadea (2027) - Series Composition

=== Tokusatsu ===
- Bakuage Sentai Boonboomger (2024-2025) - Main Screenwriter, Screenplay
- Super Space Sheriff Gavan Infinity (2026) - Main Screenwriter, Screenplay
- Kakuseihunter Omegahorn (2026-Present) - Main Screenwriter, Screenplay

=== Original video animation ===
- Power Dolls - Project Alpha (1998) - Screenplay
- Yuuwaku Countdown: Akira (1997) - Screenplay
- Ecchies (1997) - Screenplay
- Beyond (1998) - Screenplay
- I Dream of Mimi (1997) - Screenplay
- Vandread Integral (2001) - Screenplay
- Vandread Turbulence (2002) - Series Composition, Screenplay
- Green Green Thirteen Erolutions (2004) - Screenplay
- Stratos 4 Advance (2005) - Screenplay
- Yu-Gi-Oh! 5D's: Evolving Duel! Stardust Dragon Vs. Red Dragon Archfiend (2008) - Screenplay
- Pokémon: Hoopa, The Mischief Pokemon (2015) - Screenplay

=== Original net animation ===
- Pokémon Generations (2016) - Screenplay
- Super Dragon Ball Heroes (2018–present) - Screenplay
- Fight League: Gear Gadget Generators (2019) - Series Composition, Screenplay
- Battle Spirits: Saga Brave (2019–2020) - Screenplay
- Battle Spirits: Kakumei no Galette (2020–2021) - Screenplay
- Battle Spirits: Mirage (2021–2022) - Series Composition, Screenplay
- Pokémon: The Arceus Chronicles (2022) - Screenplay

=== Films ===
- Space Battleship Yamato: Resurrection (2009) - Screenplay
- Inazuma Eleven: Saikyō Gundan Ōga Shūrai (2010) - Screenplay
- Inazuma Eleven GO: Kyūkyoku no Kizuna Gurifon (2011) - Composition Assistant
- Inazuma Eleven GO vs. Danbōru Senki W (2012) - Composition Assistant
- Inazuma Eleven: Chou Jigen Dream Match (2014) - Screenplay
- Pokémon: Pikachu, Kore Nan no Kagi? (2014) - Screenplay
- Pokémon the Movie: Hoopa and the Clash of Ages (2015) - Screenplay
- Pokémon the Movie: Volcanion and the Mechanical Marvel (2016) - Screenplay
- One Piece: Stampede (2019) - Screenplay
- BEM: Become Human (2020) - Screenplay
- Pokémon the Movie: Secrets of the Jungle (2020) - Screenplay
- The Journey (2021) - Screenplay
- Eiga Kaiketsu Zorori: Lalala Star Tanjou (2022) - Screenplay

=== Video games ===
- Blue Dragon (2006) - Scenario scriptwriter
- Lost Odyssey (2007) - Scenario scriptwriter
- Inazuma Eleven (2008) - Scenario
- Inazuma Eleven 2 (2009) - Scenario
