= Goodbye, Lara =

2026 Japanese anime project

- Key visual

さよならララ (Sayonara Rara)
- Created by: Kinema Citrus
- Anime television series
- Directed by: Takushi Koide
- Produced by: Anna Kawahara
- Music by: Yuma Yamaguchi
- Studio: Kinema Citrus
- Licensed by: Crunchyroll
- Original network: Tokyo MX, BS Asahi, ytv, AT-X
- Original run: July 6, 2026 – September 21, 2026
- Episodes: 12
- Light novel
- Written by: Chihiro Haruna
- Illustrated by: Yū Kuroto
- Published by: ASCII Media Works
- Imprint: Dengeki Bunko
- Published: October 9, 2026
- Volumes: 1
- Manga
- Illustrated by: Saburouta
- Published by: Kadokawa Shoten
- Magazine: KadoComi
- Original run: October 23, 2026 – present

Goodbye, Lara (Japanese: さよならララ, Hepburn: Sayonara Rara) is an original Japanese anime television series created and produced by Kinema Citrus for the studio's 15th anniversary, announced as one of the studio's two works at the 2024 Anime Central convention in Chicago, Illinois. A modern reimagining of "The Little Mermaid" by Hans Christian Andersen, the series follows Lara, a mermaid princess who is resurrected to modern day Japan to rediscover true love and rescue her kingdom. It aired from July to September 2026.

== Plot ==
Lara, a mermaid princess who is beloved by her father, the Sea King, and her sisters, enters into a forbidden love with a human prince and aspires to live with him on land. She drinks a potion created by Grace to become a human and lives with the prince, while being warned the potion expires if she fails to experience true love. However, the prince rejects Lara after learning she is a mermaid, and she vanishes into foam due to the potion's effects and discovers her kingdom has collapsed. Lara is resurrected in Lake Biwa two hundred years later under a trial set by Grace, and she sets out to find true love again and rescue her kingdom.

== Characters ==
Lara (ララ, Rara)
Voiced by: Hana Hishikawa (Japanese); Brianna Knickerbocker (English)
A mermaid princess who is resurrected two hundred years later in Lake Biwa as part of a trial set by Grace to find true love again to restore her fallen kingdom. Like "The Little Mermaid", Lara rescues and falls in love with a human prince, which leads her making a deal with a sea witch to become a human in exchange for her voice, with the price that she will vanish into foam if she fails to make the prince return her love. Unlike its ending, the anime provides an original continuation.
Mari Otsu (大津 茉里, Ōtsu Mari)
Voiced by: Nana Kawaishi (Japanese); Anairis Quiñones (English)
A high school girl who lives in Ōtsu and is a national-level boxer. She lost her mother at a young age and allows Lara to live in her home. While Mari seems not to care about Lara at first, Mari comes to understand Lara's upbringing as a mermaid and transformation into a human. She teaches Lara how to live as one in the modern world's environment.
Grace (グレイス, Gureisu)
Voiced by: Rica Fukami, Yui Ogura (young) (Japanese); Tiana Camacho (English)
A sea witch banished by Rowan and Lara's aunt. She challenges her in a trial to find true love and has a hatred for authority. In the modern world, Grace has taken the form of a fish owned by Mari and is named "Gon-chan". Like Lara, Grace held a fascination towards the human world, only for it to lead to the deaths of the prince she loved and her twin sister Rigmor. Grace discreetly supported Lara and Mari's relationship, hoping they can break the long-held belief of the incompatibility between humans and merfolk.
Lisa (リサ, Risa)
Voiced by: Minami Tsuda (Japanese); Cat Protano (English)
Lara's caring older sister who is searching for her following Lara's resurrection. She currently maintains a human form, but still harbors doubts and resentments on interactions between humans and merfolk following years of captivity as a museum exhibit, with the extreme trauma following her captivity causing her to develop severe nyctophobia.
Rowan (ローワン, Rōwan)
Voiced by: Masaki Terasoma, Shimba Tsuchiya (young) (Japanese); Brook Chalmers (English)
The Sea King is a widowed merman, father of Lara and his 5 older daughters. He is still alive, though trapped in a deep sleep. He greatly resents humans after they killed Rigmor.
Luca Akizuki (ルカ, Ruka)
Voiced by: Ayumu Murase (Japanese); Kieran Regan (English)
A boy whom Lara meets after her resurrection. He bears a physical resemblance to the human prince Lara loved in the past, though he is otherwise different in personality. He has a younger brother named Leo Akizuki and spends his free time painting abstract artworks.
Kota (コータ, Kōta)
Voiced by: Kazutomi Yamamoto (Japanese); Jonathon Ha (English)
A devoted acquaintance of Lisa who freed her after a fire engulfed the museum she was imprisoned in. They once took the form of an anglerfish during Lisa and Lara's time as mermaids before turning into a human after stealing the remainder of Grace's potions. They also claim to know Lara, despite the latter not recognizing them.
Yoshiya Otsu (大津 祥弥, Ōtsu Yoshiya)
Voiced by: Tomohiro Ōno (Japanese); John Patneaude (English)
Mari's older brother. He also studies in the same school as her, though he tends to skip classes. His full name is Otsu Yoshihiro and he likes to ride his motorcycle.
Makoto Otsu (大津 誠, Ōtsu Makoto)
Voiced by: Mitsuaki Madono (Japanese); Bill Millsap (English)
Mari and Yoshiya's father who has a hobby as a freelance photographer.
Ema Otsu (大津 江万, Ōtsu Ema)
Voiced by: Nanae Sumitomo (Japanese); Tara Sands (English)
Mari and Yoshiya's grandmother who works as a church pastor and gently watches over the children with Makoto.
Rigmor (リグモア, Rigumoa)
Voiced by: Kaori Ishihara
The queen of the kingdom and Grace's twin sister. She would marry Rowan and become the mother of Lara, Lisa, and their sisters. She sacrificed herself to protect Grace from vengeful humans.

== Production and release ==
Goodbye, Lara is directed by Takushi Koide with series composition by Anna Kawahara, Shiori Tani designing the characters and Yuma Yamaguchi composing the music. The series aired from July 6 to September 21, 2026, on Tokyo MX and other networks. (Note: Tokyo MX listed the series premiere on July 5 at 24:30, which is effectively July 6 at 12:30 a.m. JST.) Shiga Prefecture was used as the basis of the anime's modern day setting, which is Koide's hometown. Koide said that the anime's story was based on "The Little Mermaid". During his talk at Anime Expo 2026, he mentioned that Goodbye, Lara was an original project that he wanted to do. The opening theme song is "Sayonara Lara" (さよならララ), performed by Ikimonogakari, while the ending theme song is "Hearts Glow", performed by Hana Hope. Portions of the opening were drawn using traditional cel animation. Crunchyroll is streaming the series.

=== Screening ===
The first episode was shown in a special screening event at Otsu City Hall on June 30, 2026. The episode was also shown at Anime Expo 2026.

=== Casting ===
During a talk after the screening at Otsu City Hall on June 30, 2026, the casting of Nana Kawaishi as Mari was done to select potential voice actresses who are from the prefecture. This was done to represent Shiga in daily life, including the use of local dialects in the anime.

== Episodes ==
No.	Title	Directed by	Written by	Storyboarded by	Original release date
1	"Mermaid Princess Lara"; Transliteration: "Ningyo Hime Rara" (Japanese: 人魚姫ララ)	Takushi Koide	Anna Kawahara	Takushi Koide	July 6, 2026
In 1777, a mermaid is born to merfolk royalty and is named Lara. As Lara grows up, the Sea Witch Grace tells Rowan that Lara is prophesied to bring destruction. Lara is educated on the law forbidding merfolk from interacting with humans, despite Lara's fascination with them. In 1792, a teenaged Lara rescues a drowning human prince, but Rowan jails her for her disobedience. Grace gifts Lara a potion that will turn her into a human. Wanting to be with the prince, Lara drinks the potion, though Grace warns that it is temporary and she will vanish into foam unless she finds true love. Lara lives with the prince at his palace, but Lara reverts back to her mermaid form when she is about to kiss him. Although the prince attempts to kill her, Lara realizes she found true love before vanishing. Lara reawakens from a seashell to find that the kingdom collapsed due to her actions. Lara sees Rowan proclaiming she will save them from a deep sleep placed by Grace. Grace places Lara in a trial by resurrecting her in 2026 to the modern world of humans. Lara lands in Ōtsu, Shiga and is punched by a human girl named Mari Otsu.
2	"Running Through Shiga"; Transliteration: "Shiga o Hashiru" (Japanese: 滋賀を走る)	Yōsuke Satō	Anna Kawahara	Takushi Koide	July 13, 2026
Lara wakes up in Mari's home to discover she is in her human form again and is overwhelmed by the modern world. Grace, who reveals herself as Mari's pet fish, tells Lara that the unconscious merfolk are in her mansion at Okishima and urges her to find true love with a human again to reawaken them. Lara notices her royal ring has gone missing and leaves, forcing Grace to push an indifferent Mari to chase after her. Lara heads to the waterfront near Lake Biwa to find it while recalling her sisters discuss the value of true love and how her light empowers their kingdom and the merfolk. Lara fears the ring's loss will make her lose her childhood memories and almost drowns, but is saved by Mari. Lara thanks Mari while taking shelter from a storm, during which Mari recounts how she found Grace and cherished her growing up. Lara later asks Grace if she can be able to find true love while taking a glimpse at Mari. Meanwhile, at Grace's mansion, Lara's sister Lisa and her acquaintance Kota learn that Lara has been resurrected, leaving Lisa hopeful in reuniting with her sister.
3	"Look Away and You Lose"; Transliteration: "Me, Sora Shitara Make" (Japanese: 目、そらしたら負け)	Ayaka Tsuji	Yusuke Aose	Ayaka Tsuji	July 20, 2026
Mari practices her boxing and runs into upperclassman Nagahama, who vows to defeat her. Mari recalls getting into boxing with her mother's support. Mari and Nagahama argue, forcing their coach to hold a sparring match to determine who will qualify for the national tournament. At the Otsu home, Grace tells Lara that she must overcome her past pain and fear from the prince's rejection, though Lara causes antics. Mari grows frustrated at Lara's naivety and states she can no longer stay with her. Feeling that she upset Mari, Lara travels to her match with Yoshiya to make amends. Mari falters to Nagahama upon being reminded of her mother's fatal heart attack, when Lara arrives. Mari apologizes to Lara and Nagahama for her behavior and ties the match. Mari allows Lara to continue staying while complimenting her naivety as being cute, flustering Lara. A whale-shaped monolith rises from Lake Biwa, which Lisa perceives as Lara finding new love to save the kingdom while retrieving Lara's ring.
4	"The Princess and the Prince"; Transliteration: "Hime to Ōji" (Japanese: 姫と王子)	Yuki Koike	Mai Inui	Takushi Koide	July 27, 2026
Lara repeatedly asks Mari to be taken to her school to find a new prince to love, and Mari relents. Lara learns of two students named Ouji and Himeka, who resemble a couple from a romance show Lara watched. She asks Himeka if she loves Ouji. A bashful Himeka insists on valuing her friendship with Ouji, though she wistfully admits to liking Ouji upon seeing him with another girl. Lara learns about unrequited love as Himeka fears on jeopardizing their friendship. After recounting how she failed to confess her feelings to the prince due to Grace taking away her voice, Lara requests Himeka to speak with Ouji and not be left with regrets. Himeka becomes inspired by her words and talks to Ouji, allowing them to remain close friends. Himeka tells Lara that she still has more chances to fall in love again beyond Ouji and thanks her on being able to gain closure. Later on, Kota approaches Lara on Lisa's behalf. Lara and Lisa reunite through a phone call, where Lisa promises to see her again and observes Lara and Mari's closeness.
5	"I'm Willing to Die for Cake!"; Transliteration: "Kēki no Tame nara Shinemasu!" (Japanese: ケーキのためなら死ねます！)	Keisuke Hiroe	Anna Kawahara	Keisuke Hiroe	August 3, 2026
Ema urges Mari and Lara to apply for a job to pay for the house's damages. Makoto adds to Lara that he was able to find love through work. The two girls work at a cake-shop though Lara is annoyed at being assigned menial tasks. Feeling her work is not yet contributing to her goal, Lara takes on bigger responsibilities, worrying her colleagues. Lara jeopardizes a batch of cakes during a shift, prompting the manager to ask what has been troubling her. Lara apologizes to the manager and her colleagues on her shortcomings, as she and Mari are able to repay Ema. Lara confides in Mari on being able to understand humans more and seeing new sides to Mari. Sometime later, Lara has a chance encounter with Lisa, who states her displeasure at Lara following Grace's plans to find true love with a human. Lisa reveals she has sent Kota to deal with Mari to uphold the law forbidding human interaction. A troubled Lara races back to the Otsu home and sees that Mari is safe, during which the monolith attacks Kota to Lisa's horror.
6	"The Light That Shines on Me"; Transliteration: "Watashi o Terasu Hikari" (Japanese: わたしを照らす光)	Asuka Kosato	Yusuke Aose	Asuka Kosato	August 10, 2026
Grace insists to Lara that Lisa had stolen her potions to become human. Meanwhile, Lisa and Kota hasten their search on Grace's whereabouts. Lisa recalls being captured by humans while relocating with Rowan and the kingdom to be used as a museum exhibit, fueling her misanthropy. Lisa was freed by Kota, who gave her Grace's potions to become human. They located Grace's mansion in 1931 to find the kingdom in a deep sleep and Rowan sacrificing himself to give Lara a chance to resurrect. Grace mocked Lisa and Kota's efforts to rescue the kingdom, prompting the two to spend years begrudgingly working with a human scientist named Seizo Horikoshi to reproduce Grace's potion and maintain their human forms until Seizo's passing. After waiting since 1984, Lisa and Kota gain hope at Lara's resurrection, but Lisa discovers to her shock that Lara became human again to find love. Seizo's potion loses its strength in the present, as Lisa and Kota deduce that Grace is at the Otsu home. Elsewhere, Lara and Mari encounter a boy resembling Lara's prince, causing a stunned Lara to momentarily turn back into a mermaid.
7	"Meet Me at Biwako Terrace Saturday at 10"; Transliteration: "Doyō no Jū-ji, Biwako Terasu de" (Japanese: 土曜の10時、びわ湖テラスで)	Eisaku Kawanami	Mai Inui	Eisaku Kawanami	August 17, 2026
Mari and Lara escape as Grace surmises the encounter deeply affected Lara. The boy introduces himself as Luca and invites Lara to various outings. Lara sees him as eccentric and shares to Mari on her assumptions of Luca being different from the prince. While Luca showcases to her his artworks, Lara's traumatic memory of the prince turning on her resurfaces, causing Lara to distance herself from Luca. Lara remembers how in her final moments before turning to foam, the light that symbolizes her heart transformed into a dagger to almost kill the prince as retribution, leading her to believe the monolith is her light's manifestation. Seeing Lara's despondent behavior, Mari asks her to resolve the situation. Lara requests Luca to avoid her, but Luca states he values her as a friend beyond her mermaid form. Lara is comforted by Luca accepting her for who she is and joins him at a fireworks festival, unaware that she is gradually turning back to foam like Lisa and Kota.
8	"The Night of the Final Match"; Transliteration: "Kesshōsen no Yoru" (Japanese: 決勝戦の夜)	Naoki Yoshibe	Yusuke Aose	Naoki Yoshibe	August 24, 2026
Believing that Lara has now found her true love in Luca, Mari focuses her attention on the tournament. Mari notices Lara foaming and suddenly meets Lisa, who informs her of Lara's imminent death. Mari pleads with Lara to return to her sister while delaying her foaming with the potion, opening up on not wanting her to die. Lara joins Lisa and questions her identity as the princess who will save her kingdom. Meanwhile, Mari reaches the tournament's final match and tries to brush off Lara's absence, even as Luca notices her uneasiness. Lara calls Luca on her indecision, during which Luca shows her Mari's final match. Lara and the monolith react emotionally to seeing a determined Mari and the good in humans, inspiring her to stay in the human world despite Lisa's protests. Lara races to cheer Mari, allowing Mari to narrowly win and recount her mother's hopes of her finding someone to support her. Lara shares her renewed desire to find love while supporting Mari's goal of becoming a professional boxer, charming Mari.
9	"True Love"; Transliteration: "Hontō no Ai" (Japanese: 本当の愛)	Ayaka Tsuji	Anna Kawahara	Ayaka Tsuji	August 31, 2026
Despite Grace's doubts and her own reservations of seeing Luca as her true love, Lara continues bonding with him. Luca's brother Leo deduces her intentions and suggests on making a move, causing Lara to confront her indecisiveness. Mari and Luca discuss Lara's distant demeanor, where Mari voices support for her friendship with Luca even as she becomes fond of Lara. Later, Lara confides in Mari on Himeka's suggestion to confess her feelings, as Grace becomes sick and her blood is traced by Lisa and Kota. With time running out before she turns to foam, Lara hastily confesses to Luca and tries to kiss him, but a hesitant Luca asks they not rush their relationship. Lara slowly realizes her lack of feelings for Luca. The monolith responds to Lara's frustrations and violently attacks Luca, though she saves him before falling unconscious. She is then abducted by Lisa, shocking Luca. Mari finds Kota aiming to collect Grace at the Otsu home, when Grace transforms back into a mermaid and escapes into Lake Biwa. Mari learns of Lara's abduction from Luca, while Kota races to the mansion ahead of the frail Grace. At her mansion, a seashell slowly reopens.
10	"The Princess with a Blade"; Transliteration: "Ha o Motta Purinsesu" (Japanese: 刃を持ったプリンセス)	Shinnosuke Itō, Yoshihiko Mori, Sayaka Osato & Shinya Iino	Mai Inui	Takushi Koide	September 7, 2026
Lara reawakens back in Grace's mansion, where Lisa states that Grace is heading to them in a last-ditch effort to get her light. Grace arrives to hold Lara back and prevent Rowan from reawakening until she dies. Lara becomes stricken with grief as Lisa demands her to forget her time with the humans. Rowan, regaining his strength, blames the humans for killing Lara's mother Rigmor and ruining their kingdom. Rowan reveals her light can only return from its monolith form to save them once it has fulfilled its desire of consuming the soul of Lara's love. Seeing her lack of conviction, Rowan bluntly asks who she truly loves, and Lara realizes her feelings for Mari. Back in Ōtsu, Mari and Luca surmise that Lara is in Okishima. They witness Shiga and Lake Biwa being negatively affected by Lara's light, while Mari grows desperate in reuniting with Lara. Lara suddenly calls to tell Mari of Grace's death and to distance herself from her, thanking Mari before hanging up and leaving both girls in tears. The next day, Yoshiya and Luca prepare to travel to Okishima with Mari, only to witness her being dragged by one of Grace's pets under Lake Biwa.
11	"Grace the Witch"; Transliteration: "Majo Gureisu" (Japanese: 魔女グレイス)	Yōsuke Satō	Yusuke Aose	Yōsuke Satō	September 14, 2026
Mari is brought to Grace's chambers to see her past. Grace once lived with her twin sister Rigmor, often rebelling against the kingdom's strict authority. Grace voiced interest in exploring the human world but went alone after Rigmor married the idealistic Rowan. They shared a true love's kiss to bring light back to the kingdom, while Grace began loving a human prince. She was about to kiss him, until Grace turned back into a mermaid. The offended prince prepared to kill her but was murdered by her light in self-defense, causing a distraught Grace to become the Sea Witch. Rigmor sacrificed herself to save Grace from the humans, leading Rowan to greatly resent Grace and all of humanity, which were imparted to Lara and Lisa. Grace was reminded by Rigmor's words to live for love upon witnessing Lara sacrifice herself to protect her prince. Sensing her own failing health and wanting Lara to prove that love with a human is possible, Grace nursed Lara's remains and turned into a fish to be found by Mari. Grace tells Mari in her final words that she and Lara must live for love rather than be held back by laws, as Rowan reverts Lara back to her mermaid form.
12	"Goodbye, Lara"; Transliteration: "Sayonara Rara" (Japanese: さよならララ)	Takushi Koide	Anna Kawahara	Takushi Koide	September 21, 2026
Lara was reverted back to her mermaid form, and what is left of the palace was flooded with water. Listening to the final words from her fallen sisters, Lara became the new ruler of mermaids to forget about all humanity. Meanwhile, Lisa got away unscathed, but she witnessed Kota on a verge of death. Mari then met Lisa again, and Mari went to find Lara who is above the obelisk, despite the final warning Lisa gave it to Mari where she will die. Then, Mari found Lara, and Lara was about to commit suicide in hopes to not hurt her anymore. However, the dagger kills Mari when she told her that they were both finding someone they love. Lara then breaks the dagger, which caused a giant fish to swallow her and crushes her with spikes. When all hope seems to be lost, Lara heard Mari's voice, and revives Mari, finally bringing light to the entire town. Six months later, Lisa tells Lara, now completely human, that it will take years for Rowan and the merfolk to wake up. While Lara will work with the future of merfolk and humans, Lisa gives her the ring she had lost once before. Lara later meets Mari one last time, as she is going to Kobe in order to find someplace to live. As Mari sees Lara off, she hopes that they will meet again soon.

== Other media ==
=== Light novel ===
A light novel adaptation, written by Chihiro Haruna and illustrated by Yū Kuroto, was published under ASCII Media Works' Dengeki Bunko imprint on October 9, 2026.

=== Manga ===
A manga adaptation, illustrated by Saburouta, began serialization on Kadokawa Shoten's KadoComi website on October 23, 2026.

== See also ==
- Star Wars: Visions, an animated anthology series in which two short films, "The Village Bride" and "The Lost Ones," are animated by Kinema Citrus and feature character designs by Shiori Tani
