= Chōjin-teki Share House Story Charisma =

Japanese mixed-media project

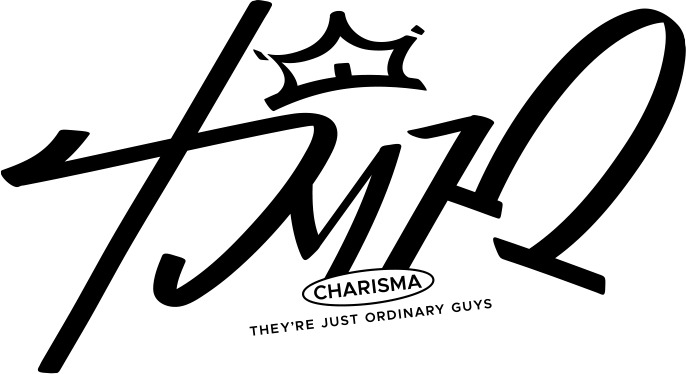

超人的シェアハウスストーリー『カリスマ』 (Chōjin-teki Shea Hausu Sutōrī Karisuma)
- Created by: Dazed; Shū Matsubara
- Manga

Charisma: Kyō mo Heiwa Desu
- Written by: Shū Matsubara; Rin Manda
- Illustrated by: Iori Irino
- Published by: Kodansha
- Magazine: Dessert
- Original run: January 24, 2023 – December 23, 2024
- Volumes: 2
- Manga

Charisma: Charisma na Karera wa Charisma House de Karizumai-chū
- Written by: Shū Matsubara; Sō Tobita
- Illustrated by: Sō Tobita
- Published by: Kodansha
- Magazine: Comic Days
- Original run: February 22, 2023 – December 27, 2023
- Volumes: 2
- Anime television series

Charisma
- Directed by: Jōji Furuta
- Written by: Shū Matsubara
- Music by: Evil Line Records; Gesshoku Kaigi
- Studio: Pierrot Films
- Original network: JNN (TBS)
- Original run: January 7, 2027 – scheduled

Chōjin-teki Share House Story Charisma (Japanese: 超人的シェアハウスストーリー『カリスマ』, Hepburn: Chōjin-teki Shea Hausu Sutōrī Karisuma; lit. 'Superhuman Shared Residence Story: Charisma') is a Japanese 2.5D mixed-media project centering around 2D characters created by Shū Matsubara, King Records under their Evil Line Records label and Dazed, which launched in 2021 and consists of various musical releases and live concerts. A four-panel manga series with storyboard by Rin Manda and art by Iori Irino titled Charisma: Kyō mo Heiwa Desu was serialized in Kodansha's shōjo manga magazine Dessert from January 2023 to December 2024 and was collected in two tankōbon volumes. A second manga series with story and art by Sō Tobita titled Charisma: Charisma na Karera wa Charisma House de Karizumai-chū was serialized on Kodansha's Comic Days website from February to December 2023 and was also collected in two tankōbon volumes. An anime television series produced by Pierrot Films titled Charisma is set to premiere in January 2027.

== Characters ==
Iori Motohashi (本橋依央利, Motohashi Iori)
Voiced by: Katsumi Fukuhara
Terra (テラ, Tera)
Voiced by: Genki Okawa
Rikai Kusanagi (草薙理解, Kusanagi Rikai)
Voiced by: Masahiro Yamanaka
Kei Sarukawa (猿川慧, Sarukawa Kei)
Voiced by: Kenta Hosoda
Ohse Minato (湊大瀬, Minato Ohse)
Voiced by: Saku Hyūga
Amahiko Tendō (天堂天彦, Tendō Amahiko)
Voiced by: Tomohisa Hashizume
Fumiya Itō (伊藤ふみや, Itō Fumiya)
Voiced by: Yūki Ono
Sōemon Nakagami (中神総右衛門, Nakagami Sōemon)
Voiced by: Shinnosuke Tachibana
Shū Torahime (虎姫柊, Torahime Shū)
Voiced by: Tomohiro Ōno
Amahiko Tendo (天道天彦, Tendō Amabiko)
Voiced by: Tomohisa Hashizume

== Other media ==
=== Manga ===
==== Charisma: Kyō mo Heiwa Desu ====
No.	Release date	ISBN
1	December 6, 2023	978-4-06-534101-8; 978-4-06-534050-9 (SE)
2	March 13, 2025	978-4-06-538993-5 (SE)

==== Charisma: Charisma na Karera wa Charisma House de Karizumai-chū ====
No.	Release date	ISBN
1	September 20, 2023	978-4-06-532690-9; 978-4-06-532691-6 (SE)
2	February 22, 2024	978-4-06-534657-0; 978-4-06-534651-8 (SE)

=== Anime ===
An anime television series titled Charisma was announced during the Makuhari performance of the Charisma Gumbo Tour on November 29, 2025. The series will be produced by Pierrot Films and directed by Jōji Furuta, with Matsubura handling series composition and screenplays, Ebimo credited for original character design, Haru Watanabe designing the characters, and Evil Line Records and Gesshoku Kaigi handling and composing the music. It is set to premiere on January 7, 2027, on TBS and its affiliates.
