= Tomohiro Ōno =

Japanese voice actor

- 大野 智敬
- Born: November 7 Hyōgo Prefecture, Japan
- Occupation: Voice actor
- Agent: Mausu Promotion

Tomohiro Ōno (大野 智敬, Ōno Tomohiro) is a Japanese voice actor affiliated with Mausu Promotion.

== Filmography ==
=== Anime series ===
Year	Title	Role	Notes	Ref.
2020	Boruto: Naruto Next Generations	Yuga		
2020	Cardfight!! Vanguard Gaiden if	Member D		
2020	Haikyu!! To The Top	Chiharu Tsukioka		
2020	Puzzle & Dragons	Youth 3		
2020	Talentless Nana	Ryūji Ishii		
2021	86	Male Rookie		
2021	Edens Zero	Various characters		
2021	Neko Jockey	Skilled Horserider, Mannenbilly, American Cat Jockey		
2021	Scarlet Nexus	Rookie Soldier		
2021	Takt Op. Destiny	Soldier		
2021	The Faraway Paladin	Young Man, Deacon, Adventurer		
2021	The Hidden Dungeon Only I Can Enter	Student A, Audience E		
2022	Aoashi	Akito Sugawara		
2022	Arifureta	Seafarer Soldier A		
2022	Black Rock Shooter: Down Fall	Peacebuilding Army Soldier		
2022	Dropkick on My Devil!!! X	Mob I		
2022	Healer Girl	Student		
2022	Immoral Guild	Lani Woodman, You Smith, Clothing Storekeeper, Micreep		
2022	Love Flops	Male Student		
2022	Muv-Luv Alternative	Classmate		
2022	Reincarnated as a Sword	Merchant 2, Adventurer 2, High Goblin 2, Rig		
2022	Sasaki and Miyano	Yūtarō Ezaki		
2022	Shikimori's Not Just a Cutie	Male Student, Clown, Man		
2022	Shine Post	Male High School Student, Customer, Fan, Staff		
2022	Shoot! Goal to the Future	Fellow		
2022	The Little Lies We All Tell	Male Student 1		
2022	To Your Eternity	Ben, Boy		
2022	Tomodachi Game	Makoto Shibe		
2022	Urusei Yatsura	Male Student, Club Member, Demon, Boy, Rabbit		
2022	World's End Harem	Ex-Friend		
2023	Cardfight!! Vanguard will+Dress	Audience		
2023	Chillin' in My 30s After Getting Fired from the Demon King's Army	Sakai		
2023	Classroom for Heroes	Cassim		
2023	Dead Mount Death Play	Man		
2023	I Shall Survive Using Potions!	Koichi Nagase, Cedric, Bowman, Guard, Kidnapper, Thief, Soldier		
2023	Kuma Kuma Kuma Bear Punch!	Jade		
2023	My Love Story with Yamada-kun at Lv999	Kim		
2023	Oshi no Ko	Nobuyuki Kumano		
2023	Rokudo's Bad Girls	Various Characters		
2023	Rurouni Kenshin	Swordsman Police Officer, Shū, Shishio's Subordinate		
2023	The Saint's Magic Power Is Omnipotent	Researcher, Sailor, Knight, Sorcerer		
2024	2.5 Dimensional Seduction	Male Student A		
2024	7th Time Loop: The Villainess Enjoys a Carefree Life Married to Her Worst Enemy!	Dennis, Fritz		
2024	A Journey Through Another World: Raising Kids While Adventuring	Bolt		
2024	A Terrified Teacher at Ghoul School!	Odawara, Mikoshi Nyudo, Husband		
2024	Alya Sometimes Hides Her Feelings in Russian	Andō		
2024	Blue Miburo	Noguchi Kenji		
2024	Dahlia in Bloom	Tobias Orlando		
2024	Delusional Monthly Magazine	Shan		
2024	Fairy Tail: 100 Years Quest	Rookie Gentleman, Customer, Priest		
2024	Kaiju No. 8	Yoshimura, Operator, Examinee, Team Member		
2024	My Instant Death Ability Is So Overpowered	Ryōsuke Miyanaga		
2024	Nina the Starry Bride	Various characters		
2024	Quality Assurance in Another World	Tsukahara, Villager		
2024	Remote☆Host petit	Azumi		
2024	Seirei Gensouki: Spirit Chronicles	Takahisa Sendō		
2024	Senpai Is an Otokonoko	Mob Boy B, Pick-up Artist, Man		
2024	Shoshimin: How to Become Ordinary	Shimomura		
2024	Tasūketsu: Fate of the Majority	Kazuki Ōno		
2024	The Strongest Magician in the Demon Lord's Army Was a Human	Judge		
2024	Tōhai	Various characters		
2024	Tsukimichi: Moonlit Fantasy	Eto, Referee		
2024	Wistoria: Wand and Sword	Lyril Marze, Flip Marteau		
2024	Yakuza Fiancé	Man in the Video		
2025	Araiguma Calcal-dan	Crows, Patrasche-like Dogs		
2025	Beheneko: The Elf-Girl's Cat Is Secretly an S-Ranked Monster!	Demon, Leo		
2025	Catch Me at the Ballpark!	Announcement		
2025	Dad Is a Hero, Mom Is a Spirit, I'm a Reincarnator	Soldier 2		
2025	Grisaia: Phantom Trigger the Animation	Soldier A		
2025	Mashin Creator Wataru	Man A, Man B		
2025	Miru: Paths to My Future	Mario vasco Debritto		
2025	New Panty & Stocking with Garterbelt	Police Officer, Citizen		
2025	One-Punch Man	Citizen A		
2025	Private Tutor to the Duke's Daughter	Gil Algren		
2025	Solo Leveling: Arise from the Shadow Season 2	Ken Chiyoda		
2025	Sword of the Demon Hunter: Kijin Gentōshō	Toyoshige Mitsuhashi		
2025	The Daily Life of a Middle-Aged Online Shopper in Another World	Knight C		
2025	The Gorilla God's Go-To Girl	Lloyd, Knight Exam Candidate, Knight, Staff, Squire		
2025	The Red Ranger Becomes an Adventurer in Another World	Lowji Mist		
2025	Übel Blatt	Ikfes		
2025	With You, Our Love Will Make It Through	Fuwa Mao		
2025	Yano-kun's Ordinary Days	Math Teacher, Male Student		
2026	An Adventurer's Daily Grind at Age 29	Richat		
2026	Easygoing Territory Defense by the Optimistic Lord	Mohawk C		
2026	Goodbye, Lara	Yoshiya Otsu		
2026	Haibara's Teenage New Game+	Reita Shiratori		
2026	In the Clear Moonlit Dusk	Iguchi		
2026	Romelia War Chronicle	Ray		
2026	Rooster Fighter	Keisuke		
2026	Sentenced to Be a Hero	Holy Knights		
2026	Snowball Earth	Tamiya Sakurai		
2026	The Classroom of a Black Cat and a Witch	Astraea Libra		
2026	The Daily Life of a Part-time Torturer	Von, Villain B, Villain A, New Part-Timer A		
2026	The Invisible Man and His Soon-to-Be Wife	Karma		
2026	Tune In to the Midnight Heart	Pervert		
2026	Wash It All Away	Customer		
2026	Yoroi-Shinden Samurai Troopers	Wataru Chosokabe		
2027	Bless	Aia Udagawa		
2027	Chōjin-teki Share House Story Charisma	Shū Torahime		
2027	Go with the Clouds, North-by-Northwest	Kei Miyama		

=== Anime films ===
- Mobile Suit Gundam: Cucuruz Doan's Island (2022), White Base Crew
- Sasaki and Miyano: Graduation (2023), Yūtarō Ezaki
- Mobile Suit Gundam SEED Freedom (2024), Yū Kirishima
- A Few Moments of Cheers (2024), Light Music Club Member

=== Web Anime ===
- Hundred Note (2023), Kenzō Kamishiba

=== Video games ===
- Card-en-Ciel (2024), Neon Nanashiki
- VARLET (2025), Sota Kodaki
- Suikoden: Star Leap (TBA), Hero

=== Dubbing ===
- Big Mouth, Park Chang-ho
