= The Red Ranger Becomes an Adventurer in Another World =

Japanese manga series

- First tankōbon volume cover, featuring Tōgo Asagaki (suited up as Kizuna Red) (center) and Yihdra Arvoln (left)

戦隊レッド 異世界で冒険者になる (Sentai Reddo Isekai de Bōkensha ni Naru)
- Genre: Comedy; Isekai; Sentai
- Manga
- Written by: Koyoshi Nakayoshi
- Published by: Square Enix
- English publisher: Square Enix
- Magazine: Monthly Shōnen Gangan
- Original run: October 12, 2020 – present
- Volumes: 12
- Anime television series
- Directed by: Keiichiro Kawaguchi
- Written by: Atsuhiro Tomioka
- Music by: Koichiro Kameyama
- Studio: Satelight
- Licensed by: Crunchyroll
- Original network: AT-X, Tokyo MX, SUN, BS11, TVA, KBS Kyoto
- English network: SEA: Animax Asia
- Original run: January 12, 2025 – March 30, 2025
- Episodes: 12
- icon

The Red Ranger Becomes an Adventurer in Another World (Japanese: 戦隊レッド 異世界で冒険者になる, Hepburn: Sentai Reddo Isekai de Bōkensha ni Naru) is a Japanese manga series written and illustrated by Koyoshi Nakayoshi. It has been serialized in Square Enix's shōnen manga magazine Monthly Shōnen Gangan since October 2020. An anime television series produced by Satelight aired from January to March 2025.

== Premise ==
Leading a sentai team on Earth, Tōgo Asagaki has the ability to change into the superhero Kizuna Red. He unintentionally gets warped into a fantastical world while facing off against the supervillain Breakup King. Unable to find a way home, he joins forces with the sorceress Yihdra Arvoln, who wants to prove herself and restore her family honor, Princess Teltina Liz Wagrel Alvarost, who aims to stop demon seeds from possessing people; and Lowji Mist, Princess Teltina's bodyguard who is enamored of her and envious of Tōgo for upstaging him and appearing to grow close to her. Tōgo frequently frustrates or amazes people because he lacks subtlety and common sense, is unable to hold back in battle, and frequently vaporizes monsters, preventing his comrades from selling their body parts. Additionally, his transformation, powers, weapons, and ability to summon a mecha are not magical in nature and make no sense to magic users.

== Characters ==
=== Tōgo's Party ===
Tōgo Asagaki (浅垣 灯悟, Asagaki Tōgo) / Kizuna Red (キズナレッド, Kizuna Reddo) / Kizuna Black (キズナブラック, Kizuna Burakku)
Voiced by: Tomoya Itō (Japanese); Ethan Condon (English)
The Red Ranger of Kizuna Five who got transported to another world following the final battle against the Break Up King. After spending six months as an adventurer adjusting to the new world and helping various individuals, he meets and joins Yihdra and his new party on a quest to save Alvarost's citizens. In additions to his abilities as Kizuna Red, Tōgo also possesses an additional transformation item which allow him to transform into Kizuna Black, which has better offensive abilities but comes at the cost of emotional control; deadening him inside due to past traumas in his life he tries to bury underneath his upbeat attitude and life philosophy's. Red can also summon the Kizuna Beasts, his team's mecha from Earth, and direct them to form the Maximum Kizuna Kaiser by bringing members of his party into the mecha after establishing friendships with them.
Yihdra Arvoln (イドラ・アーヴォルン, Idora Āvorun) / Kizuna Magus (キズナマグス, Kizuna Magusu)
Voiced by: Konomi Inagaki (Japanese); Natalie Van Sistine (English)
The young head mage of the aristocratic Arvoln mage family who wishes to repair her families reputation and found a school for the instruction of magical items, after their prohibition in the setting following from incidents of misuse her father was scapegoated for permitting. She meets Tōgo, whom she finds very peculiar, with even stranger combat abilities, and forms a party with him hoping to learn about him more; while gaining feelings for him throughout the journey and being inspired by him to make more friends. She later becomes Kizuna Magus, a violet-colored Sentai member, after using her knowledge in magic to harness the Bond Energy the Kizuna Five use.
Teltina Liz Wagrel Alvarost (テルティナ・リズ・ワーグレイ・アヴァルロスト, Terutina Rizu Wāgurei Avarurosuto)
Voiced by: Minami Tanaka (Japanese); Bryn Apprill (English)
The royal princess of Alvarost who aims to stop demon seeds from possessing her people. She joins Tōgo's party in the hope of saving her kingdom.
Lowji Mist (ロゥジー・ミスト, Rojī Misuto)
Voiced by: Tomohiro Ōno (Japanese); Bradley Gareth (English)
Princess Teltina's devoted bodyguard, who harbors deep affection for her. Before his recruitment, he was a homeless man ostracized for his complete lack of mana. Teltina befriended him and inspired his transformation, culminating in his ability to wield the Holy Sword, which chooses him as its bearer. He initially resents Togo for his own lack of mana and his natural ability to form bonds, including with Teltina. However, he eventually develops a profound respect for Togo, and the two fight together to protect the people they care for.
Raniya (ラーニヤ, Rāniya) / Amen VII (アーメン VII)
Voiced by: Haruka Shiraishi (Japanese); Marwa Elda (English)
The daughter of the Sun village chief, who was gifted the power of Amen Buckler and can transform into the holy warrior Amen to protect her home and awaited for the Red Warrior of prophesy to appear. Raniya naturally possesses a timid personality, utilizing a variety of physical and emotional masks to draw out her inner strength to fight for her home and cherished ones.

=== Kizuna Five ===
Nagare Banjōji (万丈寺 流, Banjōji Nagare) / Kizuna Blue (キズナブルー, Kizuna Burū)
Voiced by: Masaya Matsukaze (Japanese); Landon McDonald (English)
The Blue Ranger of Kizuna Five. He is the heir to the Banjoji Group and a young president of an IT company.
Emily Tobihoshi (飛星 エミリ, Tobihoshi Emiri) / Kizuna Yellow (キズナイエロー, Kizuna Ierō)
Voiced by: Mika Kikuchi (Japanese); Krystal LaPorte (English)
The Yellow Ranger of Kizuna Five. She is an English teacher who in her youth was once a delinquent.
Shūji Kataoka (堅岡 修二, Kataoka Shūji) / Kizuna Green (キズナグリーン, Kizuna Gurīn)
Voiced by: Hiroshi Tsuchida (Japanese); Xan Cramer (English)
The Green Ranger of Kizuna Five. He is a college student with airsoft hobby and presents himself as a soldier.
Tsukasa Aizawa (愛沢 ツカサ, Aizawa Tsukasa) / Kizuna Pink (キズナピンク, Kizuna Pinku)
Voiced by: Arisa Komiya (Japanese); Celeste Perez (English)
The Pink Ranger of Kizuna Five. She is a 1st year high school student obsessed with romance.
Tenri Nikaidō (二階堂天理, Nikaidō Tenri) / Kizuna Silver (キズナシルバー, Kizuna Shirubā)
Voiced by: M.A.O (Japanese); Morgan Garrett (English)
The deceased former Silver Ranger of the Kizuna Five and Tōgo's former mentor/crush who perished in the final battle of The End King. During Tōgo's journey through the Sun Forest, it is revealed that Tenri had also been reincarnated into the same world as him following her initial death. Tenri was regarded as a legend as she was part of the infamous hero's party 1000 years ago, and she left behind a video message for Togo and gave him closure as he still felt guilty about her death in their previous world.
Kiyohiro Shindo (進藤清弘, Shindo Kiyohiro) / Kizuna White (キズナピンク, Kizuna Whitu)
Voiced by: Chiaki Kobayashi (Japanese); Aaron Dismuke (English)
Tōgo's adopted brother who was formerly known as the supervillain Bond Killer, succumbing to its darkness due to being bullied until the Kizuna Five freed him from its influence. Following his brother's disappearance to another world he joins Kizuna Five as the White Ranger to search for his brother.

=== Others ===
Azir Anuma Kukuja (アジール・アヌマ・ククジャ, Ajīru Anuma Kukuja) / Amen VIII (アーメン VIII)
Voiced by: Makoto Furukawa (Japanese); Aiden Call (young) (English)
Azir is the king of Kukja and Raniya's childhood friend. After a civil uprising kills his father, he grows cold and distant. The demon Vidan, posing as a servant, provides Azir with a Mana Seed, granting him the power to manipulate sand. He defeats Raniya and steals her Amen Buckle to augment his own abilities. During a confrontation, the Mana Seed's power overwhelms him, transforming his body into a destructive sand vortex. Raniya, with outside aid, uses her love to restore Azir to his true form. He sincerely thanks her before facing judgment from her people for his crimes.

=== Antagonists ===
Shau'ha Shemhazar (シャウハ・シェムハザール, Shauha Shemuhazāru)
Voiced by: Ryoko Shiraishi
Abu Dhabi (アブダビ, Abu Dabi)
Voiced by: Hiroyuki Yoshino
Vidan (ヴィダン)
Voiced by: Kenichi Suzumura (Japanese); Conner Allison (English)

== Media ==
=== Manga ===
Written and illustrated by Koyoshi Nakayoshi, The Red Ranger Becomes an Adventurer in Another World started in Square Enix's shōnen manga magazine Monthly Shōnen Gangan on October 12, 2020. Square Enix has collected its chapters into individual tankōbon volumes. The first volume was released on April 12, 2021. As of September 11, 2026, twelve volumes have been released.

Square Enix started publishing the series' chapters in English on its Manga Up! global service in May 2023.

==== Volumes ====
No.	Japanese release date	Japanese ISBN
1	April 12, 2021	978-4-7575-7195-2
2	September 10, 2021	978-4-7575-7466-3
3	April 12, 2022	978-4-7575-7876-0
4	October 12, 2022	978-4-7575-8199-9
5	May 11, 2023	978-4-7575-8567-6
6	November 10, 2023	978-4-7575-8897-4
7	August 9, 2024	978-4-7575-9348-0
8	December 12, 2024	978-4-7575-9564-4
9	March 12, 2025	978-4-7575-9734-1
10	September 11, 2025	978-4-301-00053-2
11	March 12, 2026	978-4-301-00382-3
12	September 11, 2026	978-4-301-00756-2

=== Anime ===
In August 2024, it was announced that the series would receive an anime television series adaptation. It is produced by Satelight and directed by Keiichiro Kawaguchi, with Kawaguchi also serving as sound director, Atsuhiro Tomioka handling series composition, Shuji Maruyama designing the characters and serving as chief animation director alongside Hideaki Onishi and Ayaki Ito, and Koichiro Kameyama composing the music. The series aired from January 12 to March 30, 2025, on AT-X and other networks. The opening theme song is "Cuz I", performed by Hikaru Makishima, and the ending theme song is "Explosive Heart", performed by Aya Uchida. Crunchyroll streams the series.

==== Episodes ====
No.	Title	Directed by	Written by	Storyboarded by	Original release date
1	"The Red Ranger and the Mage"; Transliteration: "Sentai Reddo to Mahōtsukai" (Japanese: 戦隊レッドと魔法使い)	Keiichiro Kawaguchi	Atsuhiro Tomioka	Keiichiro Kawaguchi	January 12, 2025
The Kizuna Five battles the supervillain Breakup King and his forces. Kizuna Red is forced to face Breakup King alone, but after an explosion, he wakes up in a fantasy world. Six months later, Yihdra Arvoln and her butler Poseidon test adventurers with her golem, disappointed by how weak they are. Tōgo Asagaki arrives and mistakes the golem for an enemy and attacks it. When he transforms into Kizuna Red, Yihdra is shocked because she senses no magic and does not understand his weapons and ability to make explosions. He defeats the golem, so she hires him to help her gather mana metal from some ruins. As Tōgo carries her to the ruins, he explains the Kizuna Five battles a supervillain team called the Relationship Enders. Ever since he arrived here, he has seen suffering, so he will do his best to help people while finding a way home. In turn, she explains that her father was once the Royal Scepter, the court mage with a dream of using magic to make people happy, but he was defeated and her family kicked out of the capital. The new Royal Scepter hordes magic for herself, so her dream is to take the position. They battle monsters and find the mana metal guarded by a dragon. Tōgo summons the mecha Maximum Kizuna Kaiser, but it is at low power because it runs on the power of bonds and only Tōgo and Yihdra are in it. He hugs her and tells her to believe in their friendship, and it works and allows them to defeat the dragon. Later, Yihdra decides to form an adventuring party with Tōgo to give her a chance to study his powers and hopefully find a way to get him home.
2	"A Red Ranger and Adventurers"; Transliteration: "Sentai Reddo to Bōkensha-tachi" (Japanese: 戦隊レッドと冒険者達)	Hideaki Nakano	Natsumi Morichi	Hideaki Nakano	January 19, 2025
Yihdra examines Tōgo, but cannot find anything unusual about his body, and when she tries to get a blood sample, he refuses as he is afraid of needles. The adventurers Zetsu and Lain mock Yihdra and her father. They decide to settle it in a contest to see who can defeat a unique monster in a dungeon first. When they are attacked by minotaurs, Tōgo foolishly summons the Maximum Kizuna Kaiser, which is too large to fit in the tunnel. Yihdra protects Zetsu and Lain and explains that even after her family was kicked out and her father eventually died, he taught her to help people. The monster, a giant inhuman skeleton, attacks. Tōgo remembers how his team faced a similar villain called Rejectiondra and summons a massive gun called the Victory Kizuna Buster, but it misfires because the other three are still bickering. Tōgo is injured and the other two defend Yihdra while she heals him, earning her respect. This allows the gun to work and destroy the monster. They find an injured old man and take him with them. Zetsu and Lain part ways with them as friends. Yihdra tries to take a blood sample again, but Tōgo is still afraid. The old man escapes his bed and turns into the monster, but a man and woman intercept and destroy him, then extract a demonic seed from his head.
3	"The Red Ranger, the Hero, and the Princess"; Transliteration: "Sentai Reddo to Yūsha to Hime-sama" (Japanese: 戦隊レッドと勇者と姫様)	Eiichi Sato	Atsuhiro Tomioka	Noriaki Saito	January 26, 2025
Tōgo is broke because he keeps blowing up monsters, preventing him from selling their body parts, so he moves in with Yihdra. Poseidon is upset and threatens to geld him if he tries anything with her. The two who destroyed the monster earlier, Princess Teltina and her bodyguard Lowji Mist, arrive. Teltina explains that demonic seeds have been mutating people and amplifying their power. She suspects Shau'ha, the Royal Scepter, is involved, and asks for help. Lowji objects, as he loves Teltina and only her and wants to be her only hero. He also objects to Tōgo addressing Teltina casually and challenges him to a duel for the right to travel with them. Lowji mocks the Kizuna Red form and fights evenly with him. Red summons the Maximum Kizuna Kaiser, but both Yihdra and Teltina are inside because Red already thinks they are friends. Lowji is enraged thinking Teltina was kidnapped and staggers the mecha, but it knocks him into the sky and defeats him. Lowji tries to go back on his word, but Teltina says they will travel with them. The group goes to the city of Akalina, where everyone lives in fear of Lord Loulugart and a woman tries to ask them to leave. Loulugart attacks them with monsters and has a demonic seed in his hand. Tōgo calls him out on his tyranny and tries to attack him, but the monsters keep teleporting behind him and hitting him. Lowji refuses to help him even when Teltina asks. Yihdra and Teltina cry out when Tōgo takes so much damage his transformation cuts out.
4	"The Red Ranger and the Blades of Bonds"; Transliteration: "Sentai Reddo to Kizuna no Tsurugi" (Japanese: 戦隊レッドと絆の剣)	Ryo Yasumura & Eiichi Sato	Natsumi Morichi	Noriaki Saito	February 2, 2025
Rebels led by the woman from earlier, Grossa, cover the group's escape. They learn Loulugart can instantly teleport monsters to his opponents' blind spot, so Yihdra suggests Tōgo and Lowji fight back to back, but Lowji refuses to work with him. Yihdra and Teltina bathe and start to bond. When Teltina leaves, she mischievously tricks Tōgo into entering the bath and seeing Yihdra naked. Lowji jealously steals Tōgo's transformation device. The next day, they attack Loulugart again, but Tōgo cannot transform and is knocked into a river. He has a flashback of Kizuna Silver telling him he is obsessed with forming bonds because he is afraid of being alone. Yihdra retrieves and revives him with CPR, embarrassing her because she had to kiss him. Lowji declares he only cares about Teltina and slays the monsters. A flashback shows he was shunned for lacking magic, but was worthy of his holy sword and Teltina took him in. Loulugart attacks Teltina and forces Lowji to shield her. Tōgo and Yihdra rescue them, so Lowji reluctantly returns the transformation device and confesses he tried to get Tōgo killed since he feared being replaced as Teltina's hero. After Teltina says he is irreplaceable, he still refuses to call Tōgo a friend, but they fight back to back perfectly to slay the monsters and knock Loulugart out. Loulugart's demonic seed suddenly consumes him and grows into an island-sized mass of flesh floating in the sky.
5	"The Red Ranger and the Demon Queen's Children"; Transliteration: "Sentai Reddo to Maō no Ketsuzoku" (Japanese: 戦隊レッドと魔王の血族)	Studio Massket	Atsuhiro Tomioka	Noriaki Saito	February 9, 2025
Tōgo summons the Maximum Kizuna Kaiser, with all the party members inside, and carries the mass into outer space to destroy it. Recovering Loulugart's body, Teltina reveals she also has a demonic seed and uses it to summon a wolf called Vrykolakas to devour his seed. A demon called Abu Dhabi appears—Teltina and Lowji identifying him as a Royal Demon—and reveals he and his brethren have been distributing the seeds to harvest mana to try to unseal their mother, the Demon Queen whom he and his brethren were born to over a thousand years ago. He then reveals he planted seeds in Grossa and the rebels and they immediately turned into monsters. Tōgo and Lowji take on Abu Dhabi while Yihdra and Teltina take on the monsters. Teltina is incapacitated when she absorbs too much mana. Abu Dhabi displays knowledge of otherworlders, declaring them a true problem is not dealt with. When Lowji shields Tōgo and is injured, an enraged Tōgo knocks Abu Dhabi into a building while emitting darkness. Shau'ha shows up and incapacitates all the monsters while mocking Yihdra, but Abu Dhabi escapes in the process. While they recover and turn the rebels back to normal, Yihdra tells Tōgo ancient records say the hero who sealed the Demon Queen was an otherworlder. Shau'ha teleports the party to the capital.
6	"The Red Ranger and the Mage's Dream"; Transliteration: "Sentai Reddo to Madōshi no Yume" (Japanese: 戦隊レッドと魔導士の夢)	Eiichi Sato	Natsumi Morichi	Keiichiro Kawaguchi & Eiichi Sato	February 16, 2025
Shau'ha treats Teltina and gives a potion to stop her seed from taking her over. She reveals many of the royals have seeds, but now that they know the seeds come from demons, they will hopefully give them up. Shau'ha aims to regulate and monopolize the use of magic. When Yihdra argues magic should be shared with everyone, Shau'ha mocks her and says when Yihdra's father was in charge, sharing magic led to widespread crime and disaster. When Tōgo says Shau'ha has a point, a heartbroken Yihdra flees into a blizzard. Tōgo catches up to her and clarifies that he agreed to both of their points, believing working with Shau'ha to combine their ideas will allow magic to be shared safely. Yihdra realizes she is in love with Tōgo. Tōgo later thanks Lowji for shielding him and Lowji thanks him for showing him outer space. Yihdra bathes and fiddles with a piece of mana metal. When she thinks of Tōgo, he is abruptly teleported to her. After initial embarrassment, they speculate that mana metal is connected to the power of bonds, then she apparently has sex with him, leaving them flustered. They have an audience with Teltina's father, Emperor Gunti, to discuss the seeds. Prince Dariel, who despises Teltina, suggests instead of destroying the seeds, they collect and have Shau'ha work on a way to weaponize them, arrogantly saying they can defeat the Demon Queen if she awakens. Gunti agrees and orders all seeds recalled, but assigns Teltina's group to deal with people unwilling to give them up. Yihdra tries to share ideas with Shau'ha, only to be mocked. Later, Yihdra, Tōgo, Teltina and Lowji wander a desert and reach a large cactus.
7	"The Red Ranger and the Sun Forest"; Transliteration: "Sentai Reddo to Taiyō no Mori" (Japanese: 戦隊レッドと太陽の森)	Cai Yinkai	Keiichiro Kawaguchi	Kenji Seto	February 23, 2025
The party goes to the Sun Forest, a forest of cacti in the desert, to investigate the elves and clues to the original hero. Yihdra pricks her finger on a cactus and Tōgo applies a bandage, making her think he proposed. Yihdra is abducted by an elf and Tōgo pursues until Yihdra uses the mana metal to teleport him to her so he can defeat the elf. Lowji and Teltina are attacked by elves and one of them, Raniya, uses a similar device and transformation, Egyptian-themed, to Kizuna Red. Tōgo asks them to stand down and they do. The elves take them to their village and explain the original otherworldly hero teamed up with Raniya's ancestor Amen and passed the device to her. They reveal a prophecy that a red-themed hero will save them and the figure in the mural looks like Kizuna Red. Raniya says they are at war with Azir, the lord of Kukja, who has a seed and the power to control sand. The party agrees to help and Raniya says the Great Elder knew the hero, but she is in hibernation and cannot wake for years. Three men with seeds prepare to attack the village.
8	"The Red Ranger and Bondkiller"; Transliteration: "Sentai Reddo to Bansō Kirā" (Japanese: 戦隊レッドとバンソウキラー)	Makoto Sokuza	Toshiki Inoue	Keiichiro Kawaguchi	March 2, 2025
As the elves teach Yihdra and Teltina spells, Raniya confides in Tōgo that Azir used to be her friend. He urges her to defeat and then make up with him. Yihdra becomes jealous seeing them together while he confides that he was orphaned and then adopted by Daigo Shindo, moving in with Daigo, his wife Yukari, son Kiyohiro, and daughter Sumika. He was bullied at school but Kiyohiro always saved him. As they grew older, Kiyohiro became jealous that the family paid more attention to Tōgo, allowing the Relationship Enders to turn him into the villain Bondkiller to seek revenge. By spreading and feeding on hatred, Bondkiller was a strong opponent that nearly defeated the team and destroyed the city. However, thanks to surprise interference from Solar Aquarion, the Kizuna Five successfully defeated him and turned him back to normal. Tōgo and Kiyohiro reconciled, but Kiyohiro tended to turn back into Bondkiller whenever he was jealous, forcing Tōgo to defeat him 13 times before he stopped. As the party is impressed by the story, cards rain down and start trapping people inside them, including Teltina and Yihdra.
9	"The Red Ranger and the Mental Mask"; Transliteration: "Sentai Reddo to Kokoro no Kamen" (Japanese: 戦隊レッドと心の仮面)	Yuuji Kanzaki & Yoshihide Kuriyama	Atsuhiro Tomioka	Hiromitsu Kanazawa	March 9, 2025
A man with a seed collects the cards and traps Lowji in one. Azir appears and Raniya points out he used to support equality between the races, but he says he will achieve that by conquest. Azir and the card man escape to the Udold Ruins. Raniya summons a motorcycle so she and Tōgo can pursue. After defeating a man who turned into a monster, the card man taunts them by using the cards as hostages and licking Teltina's card, but Yihdra triggers an explosion that knocks the man out, freeing everyone. Teltina angrily has Vrykolakas devour him. The party confronts Azir, but he summons a sand monster, turns the motorcycle to sand, then sucks Yihdra, Teltina, and Lowji underground, boasting he is invincible in the desert. The three fall into a tomb and are attacked by mummies. Raniya and Tōgo try to fight Azir and his sand monster, but Azir seemingly freezes time to get the advantage. Tōgo tries to warn Azir that his seed will eventually turn him into a monster, but he will not listen and sucks Tōgo underground. Raniya remembers how she and Azir became friends as children. She used to hide behind masks because she was shy, but he got her to open up. She told him the Demon Queen made it so elves lost their eternal youth and he revealed his dream to unite all races. He freezes time again and knocks her out. The others break free from underground and are shocked when Azir takes Raniya's transformation device and uses it to gain her costume and powers.
10	"The Red Ranger and the Mask of Pain"; Transliteration: "Sentai Reddo to Kurushimi no Kamen" (Japanese: 戦隊レッドと苦しみの仮面)	Makoto Sokuza	Natsumi Morichi	Ryo Yasumura	March 16, 2025
Azir revels in his new powers and declares his dream will finally come true. As Yihdra, Teltina, and Lowji tend to Raniya, Tōgo fights Azir. A flashback shows Azir's citizens were angry that he showed favoritism to elves while his father Belgan encouraged him to marry Raniya to unite their races. The citizens rioted and killed Belgan, making him conclude he needs power to subjugate everyone so that they can be united under his rule. A mysterious man named Vidan hypnotized him into thinking he was his butler and gave him a seed. As the fight continues, Azir summons his sand monster, but Lowji takes it on. Azir freezes time again, but Lowji's anti-magic sword lets him resist it, then Yihdra deduces that Azir is really controlling the sand on everyone to freeze them. Tōgo knocks Azir down and lectures him to work together with others who shared his ideals and beliefs in coexistence instead of relying on the power he craved. Azir's seed consumes him and he hurls several stone blocks at the party, but Tōgo destroys them with the Victory Kizuna Buster. Azir, driven mad by the defeat and the seed's influence, transforms his entire being into a raging sandstorm headed for Sun Forest; but Raniya hears his spirit desperately call out to her for help before the seed consumed him. Tōgo summons the Maximum Kizuna Kaiser, and with the whole party it is at 100% power, to intercept. After the credits, the origin stories of the Kizuna Five are told.
11	"The Red Ranger and a New Power"; Transliteration: "Sentai Reddo to Aratana Chikara" (Japanese: 戦隊レッドと新たな力)	Yuuji Kanzaki	Natsumi Morichi	Takeshi Mori	March 23, 2025
Raniya is further confused by the mecha with technology she has never seen before. Tōgo tries blasting the sandstorm and making a tornado to counter it, but the sandstorm just reforms every time. Yihdra makes a plan to use the power of Azir's bond with Raniya to separate him from the sand. She tries the spell, but starts to tire. Tōgo says he believes in her and she finally confesses she is in love with him, resulting in a new magic staff forming and the Maximum Kizuna Kaiser turning gold. Tōgo is left awed by Yihdra's confession, feeling the power in him rise with it; confirming their mutual feelings. With the staff boosting Yihdra's power, Raniya pulls Azir out of the sand, breaking the spell and ending the sandstorm. Teltina then has Vrykolakas devour his seed, freeing Azir from its demonic influence. Azir turns himself over to the elves for judgment along with his former conspirators, but they forgive him and agree to work for peace between their races. Vidan attacks them with lightning, revealing he is a Royal Demon. Vidan disgusts them by saying he aims to marry the Demon Queen, his own mother, and then confesses he goaded the angry mob into killing Azir's father to manipulate him. Tōgo tries to transform, but Abu Dhabi appears and stabs him; revealing he and Vidan are brothers. The others try to fight the two Royal Demons, but are quickly defeated. Enraged, Tōgo transforms into a black costume radiating darkness, Kizuna Black.
12	"Kizuna Black"; Transliteration: "Kizuna Burakku" (Japanese: キズナブラック)	Makoto Sokuza	Atsuhiro Tomioka	Keiichiro Kawaguchi	March 30, 2025
A flashback of how Kizuna Pink joined the team, then the team being told the Kizuna Black form runs on hatred and is only a last resort plays. Tōgo as Kizuna Black effortlessly beats Vidan and Abu Dhabi up. Yihdra notices he is in pain. He remembers how his biological parents were killed in a car crash, making him obsessed with forming bonds to fill the void. A new hero named Kizuna Silver appeared, but refused to join the Kizuna Five because she was clairvoyant and foresaw she would die if she joined. Tōgo fell in love with her and convinced her to join them, promising to defy fate. Unfortunately, she died in battle, saying she also foresaw herself saving his life, making him collapse in despair. He decapitates Vidan, so Abu Dhabi retreats with his still talking head. Tōgo is still berserk and attacks Sun Forest, so Yihdra, Lowji, and Raniya (with her Amen transformation powers restored to her) fight him while Teltina and Azir evacuate the elves. After getting stabbed in the shoulder, Lowji pulls off his transformation device, changing him back and knocking him out. When Tōgo wakes up, he apologizes, but they point out the Royal Demons would killed them if he had not used Kizuna Black. He is happy about all his new bonds and they invite Raniya to join their team, and she accepts. After the credits, the Kizuna Five—who have been joined by Kiyohiro as Kizuna White—deduce that Tōgo is still alive after discovering that the Kizuna Beasts have been deploying to an unknown destination for the past month even though the Enders are gone. Abu Dhabi and Vidan—who is slowly regenerating—gathers with other Royal Demons at an undisclosed location in front of the Demon Queen's body, which is sealed in a massive crystal.
