= ADK Holdings =

Japanese advertising and media holding company

ADK Holdings Inc.
- Logo used since 2014

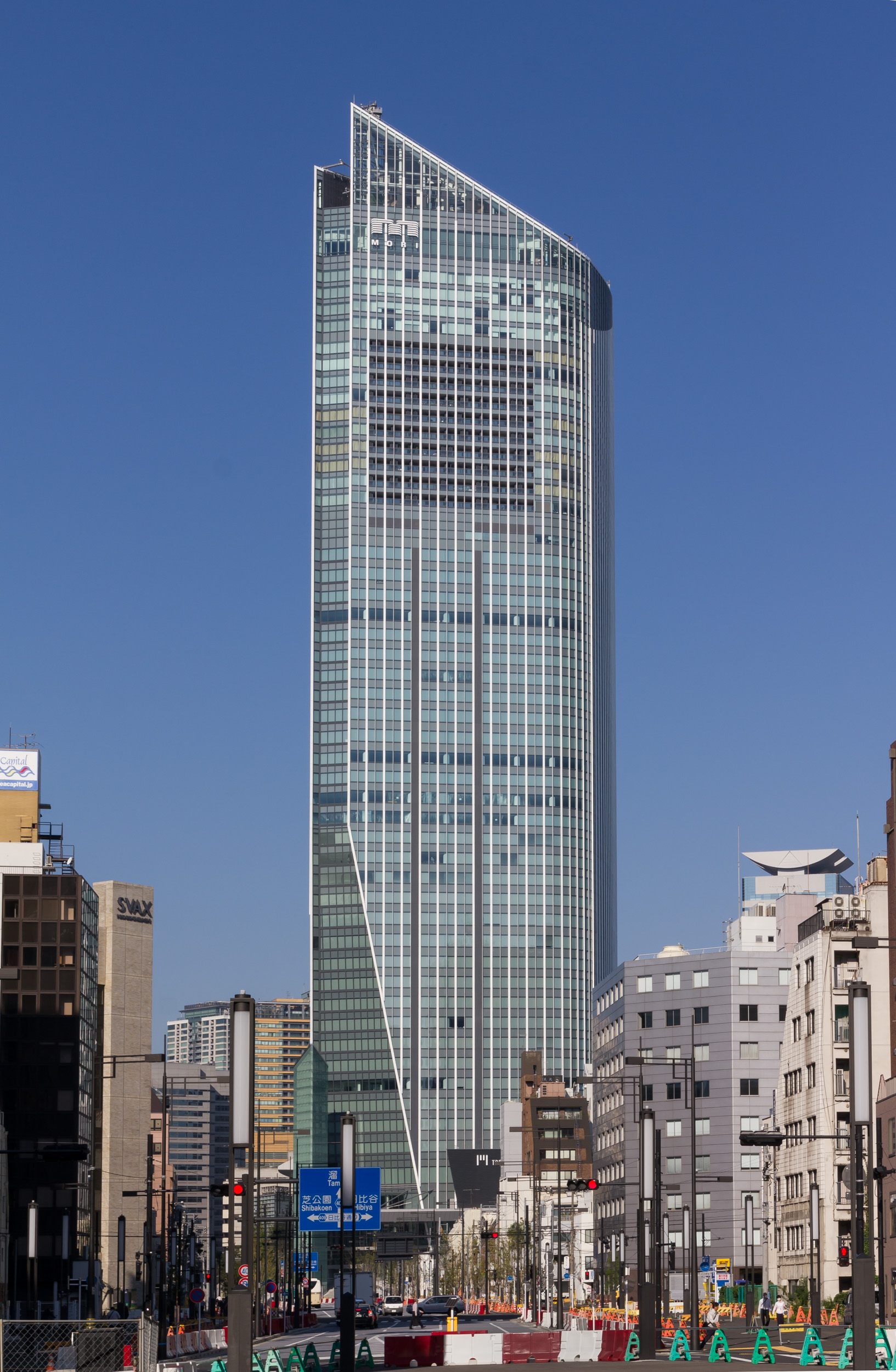
- Headquarters in Minato, Tokyo
- Trade name: ADK; ADKHD
- Native name: 株式会社ADKホールディングス
- Romanized name: Kabushiki gaisha EI DĪ KEI Hōrudingusu
- Type: Subsidiary KK
- Industry: Holding company
- Founded: June 14, 2018; 8 years ago
- Headquarters: Toranomon Hills, Toranomon, Minato, Tokyo, Japan
- Key people: Toshiya Oyama (President and CEO)
- Owner: Bain Capital (2018-2025); ADKrafton (2025-present)
- Subsidiaries: ADK Marketing Solutions; ADK Emotions; ADK Creative One
- Website: https://www.adk.jp/

ADK Marketing Solutions, Inc.
- Trade name: ADKMS
- Native name: 株式会社ADKマーケティング・ソリューションズ
- Romanized name: Kabushiki gaisha EI DĪ KEI Māketingu Soryūshonzu
- Formerly: Asatsu, Inc. (1956–1999); Asatsu-DK, Inc. (1999–2018)
- Type: Subsidiary
- Traded as: TYO: 9747
- Industry: Advertising agency
- Predecessor: Dai-ichi Kikaku
- Founded: March 19, 1956; 70 years ago
- Founder: Masao Inagaki
- Headquarters: Toranomon Hills, Toranomon, Minato, Tokyo, Japan
- Key people: Toshiya Oyama (President and CEO)
- Owner: ADK Holdings
- Subsidiaries: ADK Communications; ADK Direct
- Website: https://www.adkms.jp

ADK Creative One Inc.
- Trade name: ADKCO
- Native name: 株式会社ADKクリエイティブ・ワン
- Romanized name: Kabushiki gaisha EI DĪ KEI Kurieitibu Wan
- Formerly: Prime Pictures Inc. (1959-2019)
- Type: Subsidiary
- Industry: Commercial production
- Founded: September 24, 1959; 67 years ago
- Headquarters: Toranomon Hills, Toranomon, Minato, Tokyo, Japan
- Key people: Kenji Morinaga (president)
- Owner: ADK Holdings
- Subsidiaries: ADK Communications; ADK Direct; A-Bridge
- Website: www.adkco.jp

ADK Emotions Inc.
- Trade name: ADKEM
- Native name: 株式会社ADKエモーションズ
- Romanized name: Kabushiki gaisha EI DĪ KEI Emōshonzu
- Type: Subsidiary
- Industry: Film production Television production Anime planning and production Character licensing
- Founded: September 4, 2019; 7 years ago
- Headquarters: Toranomon Hills, Toranomon, Minato, Tokyo, Japan
- Key people: Kunihiko Shibata (president)
- Owner: ADK Holdings
- Subsidiaries: NAS; Eiken; Studio Kai; Right Song Music Publishing; ADK Emotions NY; ADK Emotions Singapore; ADK Connect Emotions Indonesia; ADK Emotions Beijing
- Website: www.adkem.jp

ADK Holdings Inc. (Note: Japanese: 株式会社ADKホールディングス, Hepburn: Kabushiki-gaisha Ei Dī Kei Hōrudingusu; ADK, formerly known as Asatsu-DK), is a Japanese holding company. Headquartered in the Toranomon Hills building complex in Minato, Tokyo since June 2014 (previously in Tsukiji, Chūō, Tokyo), the firm is Japan's third largest advertising agency after Dentsu and Hakuhodo. The agency has 80 offices in over 20 countries. One, Asatsu-DK Europe, was established in 1993 in Amsterdam, Netherlands. Bain Capital owned the company between 2018 and 2025, when it was sold to South Korean video game developer Krafton.

== History ==
Asatsu-DK's previous logo (2002–2014)

Asatsu Inc. was established in 1956 by Masao Inagaki. In August 1998, it entered a business tie-up with the WPP Group. It soon merged with fellow advertising agency Dai-ichi Kikaku Co., Ltd. (established in 1951) to form Asatsu-DK (the DK stands for Dai-ichi Kikaku) on January 1, 1999. Inagaki died on April 16, 2015. In October 2017, it was reported that U.S. private equity firm Bain Capital was looking to buy Asatsu-DK for ¥152 billion ($1.35 billion).

On January 1, 2019, it was reported that Asatsu-DK fully acquired d-rights. It had previously shared that company with Mitsubishi Corporation.

On June 24, 2025, South Korean game company Krafton announced that it would buy ADK Holdings from Bain Capital Japan as part of a strategic partnership between the two.

== Subsidiaries and interests ==
It owns a variety of interests, including production companies NAS and d-rights; animation studio Eiken; animation studio Gonzo; Nihon Bungeisha Publishing; film and print processor Taiyo Seihan; production studio Sun Artist Studio, Supervision Inc.; television commercial production house Prime Pictures; and creative services company Tokyo Ad Party.

Asatsu-DK is also involved in producing and providing its services to numerous anime series, through itself as well as its subsidiaries, including recent installments of Sunrise's Gundam series, such as the latest series Mobile Suit Gundam 00, Turn A Gundam, Mobile Suit Gundam Seed and Mobile Suit Gundam Seed Destiny, as well as several other anime titles.

== Controversy ==
In October 2022 ADK President Shinichi Ueno was arrested as part of a Prosecutors investigation into bribery. Prosecutors alleged that ADK sent ¥47 million to a former executive of the Tokyo Olympics organizing committee through two different routes in exchange for preferential treatment of sponsorship contracts for the 2020 Tokyo Olympic and Paralympic Games.
