= Keiji Fujiwara =

Japanese actor (1964–2020)

- 藤原 啓治
- Born: October 5, 1964; Tokyo, Japan
- Died: April 12, 2020 (aged 55); Tokyo, Japan
- Occupations: Actor; voice actor
- Agent: Air Agency

Keiji Fujiwara (藤原 啓治, Fujiwara Keiji; October 5, 1964 – April 12, 2020) was a Japanese actor and voice actor.

His best known works are voicing Shinnosuke's father Hiroshi Nohara in the long-running anime series Crayon Shin-chan, Maes Hughes in Fullmetal Alchemist, Holland Novak in Eureka Seven, Axel in Kingdom Hearts, Leorio in Hunter × Hunter, Shiro Fujimoto in Blue Exorcist, Shingo Shoji in Initial D, Zenzo Hattori in Gintama, Reno in the Compilation of Final Fantasy VII, and Esidisi in JoJo's Bizarre Adventure: Battle Tendency.

In the live-action field, he was most known for dubbing actor Robert Downey Jr. as Iron Man/Tony Stark.

Fujiwara founded his own talent management and production company, Air Agency, in 2006.

== Biography ==
Fujiwara was born in Tokyo. He spent the majority of his childhood in Iwate Prefecture. In high school, he handled vocals in a band he formed with his friend Kotaro Furuichi, future guitarist of rock band The Collectors.

Around 18, he moved back to Tokyo on his own and joined the Bungakuza acting school. He spent the 1980s performing in several theater troupes while working odd jobs. Fujiwara was introduced to his first voice acting agency, Ken Production, in the early 1990s. The first TV anime in which he appeared as a regular was Yokoyama Mitsuteru Sangokushi, but his breakout role was Hiroshi Nohara in Crayon Shin-chan.

In November 2006, he left Ken Production and founded his own agency, Air Agency. Aside from talent management, the company went on to release original drama and situation CDs through its child company Air Label, as well as produce live events. In 2010, Fujiwara made his own sound directorial debut in Kakkokawaii Sengen!

Fujiwara was a regular lecturer at the Japan Newart College since 2008.

== Illness and death ==
In August 2016, Fujiwara was diagnosed with an unspecified illness, though he continued to work for Air Agency and various dubbing for long as he was able to undergo medical treatment. He officially resumed work in June 2017. Fujiwara died at the Tokyo Medical Hospital from cancer on April 12, 2020, at the age of 55.

== Filmography ==
=== Television animation ===
Year	Title	Role	Notes/Refs.
1991	Yokoyama Mitsuteru Sangokushi	Zhang Fei	
1991	RPG Densetsu Hepoi	Baron Castle	
1992	Crayon Shin-chan	Hiroshi Nohara	Until 2016
1992	Ranma ½	Daitokuji Kimiyasu	
1992	Salad Juu Yuushi Tomatoman	Naple-hakase	
1993	Mobile Suit Victory Gundam	Striker Eagle, Batsraff	
1993	Nintama Rantarou	Yūzō Nomura, Sakuzō Yoshino	
1993	Shippuu! Iron Leaguer	Destiny	
1993	Jungle King Tar-chan	Manny, Garcia Mangano	
1993	Warau Salesman (special)	Katsuto Daisuke	
1994	Soccer Fever	Jim Ackermann	
1994	Metal Fighter Miku	Shibano Naoya	
1994	Bonobono	Araiguma	
1994	Mahoujin Guru Guru	Kizarandosu	
1995	Mobile Suit Gundam Wing	Noventa, many others	
1995	Nurse Angel Ririka SOS	Kazuhito Moriya	
1996	Mobile Suit Gundam: The 08th MS Team	Eledore Massis	
1996	Rurouni Kenshin	Mikio Nagaoka	
1996	Chouja Reideen	Mothman	
1996	The Vision of Escaflowne	Kajya	
1996	B't X	Ron	
1996	YAT Anshin! Uchu Ryokou	Gabriel, Winky	
1997	Hyper Police	Tachibana	
1997	The File of Young Kindaichi	Kouhei Himura; Kyousuke Saeki	
1997	Chou Mashin Eiyuuden Wataru	Topspin	
1998	Initial D	Shingo Shōji	
1998	Weiss Kreuz	Masafumi Takatori	
1998	Super Doll Licca-chan	Pierre Kayama, Mitsugi Takabayashi	
1999	Zoids: Chaotic Century	Irvine	
1999	Kaikan Phrase	Kudou	
1999	Jubei-Chan The Ninja Girl - Secret of the Lovely Eyepatch	Sai Nanohana	
2000	Fighting Spirit	Tatsuya Kimura	
2000	The Candidate for Goddess	Azuma Hijikata	
2000	Carried by the Wind: Tsukikage Ran	Junzaburo Shiina	
2000	Hidamari no Ki	Gentaku Ikawa	
2000	Inspector Fabre	Lumiere, Daniel	
2000	Clockwork Fighters Hiwou's War	Sankichi	
2001	Grappler Baki	Orochi Katsumi	
2001	Hikaru no Go	Seiji Ogata	
2001	Kasumin	Boshi; Degigame	
2001	Kokoro Library	Funny Tortoise	
2001	Galaxy Angel	Volcott O. Huey	
2001	Zoids: New Century	Jack Cisco	
2001	Arjuna	Sakurai-sensei	
2001	Rune Soldier	William	
2002	Heat Guy J	Ken Edmundo	
2002	Magical☆Shopping Arcade Abenobashi	Papan	
2002	Rockman EXE	PharaohMan, Meijin	
2002	Overman King Gainer	Kashimaru Bale	
2002	The Twelve Kingdoms	Gyoso Saku	
2002	Asobotto Senki Goku	Window	
2002	Getbackers	Haruo Ohtaki, Yamato Kudou	
2003	Fullmetal Alchemist	Maes Hughes	
2003	Kaleido Star	Kalos	
2003	Stellvia of the Universe	Jinrai Shirogane	
2003	Ashita no Nadja	Chuuhachi Ninomiya	
2003	Gad Guard	Bob Ashkenazi	
2003	Gilgamesh	Hayato Kazamatsuri	
2003	Dear Boys	Kaoru Shimojou	
2003	Rockman EXE Axess	Meijin	
2004	Ghost in the Shell: S.A.C. 2nd GIG	Rodd, Sergeant	
2004	Kyo Kara Maoh!	Rodriguez	
2004	Paranoia Agent	Shunsuke Makabe	
2004	Pocket Monsters: Advanced Generation	Matsubusa	
2004	Rockman EXE Stream	Meijin	
2004	Sgt. Frog	Narration, Paul Moriyama, various others	
2004	Jubei-Chan 2: The Counterattack of Siberia Yagyu	Sai Nanohana	
2004	Agatha Christie no Meitantei Poirot to Marple	Hassan	
2004	Kaiketsu Zorori	Dracula	
2004	Mars Daybreak	Kubernes	
2004	School Rumble	Kouji Yakushamaru/Mangoku	
2004	Daphne in the Brilliant Blue	Kevin Wei	
2005	Blood+	Nathan Mahler	
2005	Eureka Seven	Holland Novak	
2005	Honey and Clover	Shūji Hanamoto	
2005	IGPX	Yamā	
2005	Kotencotenco	Shi Rudo	
2005	Noein	Kyōji Kōriyama	
2005	Trinity Blood	Isaak Fernand von Kämpfer	
2005	Gallery Fake	Max Watson	
2005	Shinshaku Sengoku Eiyuu Densetsu - Sanada Juu Yuushi The Animation	Masanari Hattori	
2005	Naruto	Raiga Kurosuki	
2005	Black Cat	Sven Vollfied	
2005	Rockman EXE Beast	Meijin, Zoano PharaohMan	
2006	Death Note	Shuichi Aizawa	
2006	Ghost Slayers Ayashi	Ryūdō Yukiatsu	
2006	Gintama	Hattori Zenzou	
2006	Jyu Oh Sei	Colonel Heimdal	
2006	Kashimashi: Girl Meets Girl	Hitoshi Sora	
2006	Shijou Saikyou no Deshi Kenichi	Loki	
2006	Tonagura!	Mister Kagura	
2006	School Rumble: 2nd Semester	Chef, Kouji Yakushamaru/Mangoku	
2006	Oban Star Racers	Sull	
2006	009-1	Egg	
2006	Government Crime Investigation Agent Zaizen Jotaro	George Anderson	
2006	Marginal Prince	Ivy	
2006	Hell Girl: Two Mirrors	Osamu Tejima	
2006	Rockman EXE Beast+	Meijin	
2007	Baccano!	Ladd Russo	
2007	Mobile Suit Gundam 00	Ali Al-Saachez	
2007	Kenkō Zenrakei Suieibu Umishō	Amuro's Papa	
2007	Reideen	Terasaki Soji	
2007	Romeo x Juliet	Lancelot	
2007	Shakugan no Shana II	Kantaro Sakai	
2007	Sky Girls	Soya Togo	
2007	Sola	Takeshi Tsujido	
2007	Wangan Midnight	Machida	
2007	Dancouga Nova	Tanaka	
2007	Moribito - Guardian of the Spirit	Karuna Yonsa	
2007	Nodame Cantabile	Manabu Sakuma	
2007	Bakugan Battle Brawlers	Drago	
2007	Rental Magica	Gara	
2008	Antique Bakery	Keiichiro Tachibana	
2008	Birdy the Mighty Decode	Keisuke Muroto	
2008	Hyakko	Kyōichirō Amagasa	
2008	Kurozuka (novel)	Karuta	
2008	Nabari no Ou	Kannuki	
2008	Real Drive	Eiichiro Kushima	
2008	Shikabane Hime	Keisei Tagami	
2008	True Tears	Munehiro Nakagami	
2008	Xam'd: Lost Memories	Raigyo Tsunomata	
2008	Ultraviolet: Code 044	724	
2008	Kimi ga Aruji de Shitsuji ga Ore de	Iwao Uesugi	
2008	Hatenkou Yuugi	Rodori	
2008	Legends of the Dark King: A Fist of the North Star Story	Juuza	
2008	Michiko & Hatchin	Lucio Damao	
2008	Megaman Star Force Tribe	Jacky Hanzou	
2008	Sands of Destruction	Yamato	
2009	Bakugan Battle Brawlers: New Vestroia	Drago	
2009	Fullmetal Alchemist: Brotherhood	Maes Hughes	
2009	Hajime No Ippo: New Challenger	Tatsuya Kimura	
2009	Sengoku Basara	Matsunaga Hisahide	
2009	Miracle Train: Ōedo-sen e Yōkoso	Shashou	
2009	Guin Saga	Valerius	
2009	The Beast Player Erin	Nukk	
2009	Fairy Tail	Mato / Toma E. Fiore	
2009	Basquash!	Price	
2010	Arakawa Under the Bridge	Village Chief	
2010	Bakugan Battle Brawlers: Gundalian Invaders	Drago	
2010	Durarara!!	Kinnosuke Kuzuhara	
2010	Marvel Anime: Iron Man	Iron Man/Tony Stark	
2010	Ookamikakushi	Masaaki Kuzumi	
2010	Omamori Himari	Hyōgo Kaburagi	
2010	Rainbow: Nisha Rokubou no Shichinin	Ryuuji Nomoto	
2010	The Tatami Galaxy	Seitarō Higuchi	
2010	Kakko-Kawaii Sengen!	Senpai	
2010	Blessing of the Campanella	Nick La'juck	
2010	Lupin III: the Last Job (special)	Loveless	
2011	Ao no Exorcist	Shiro Fujimoto	
2011	Blood-C	Tadayoshi Kisaragi	
2011	Hunter × Hunter (2011)	Leorio Paladinight	
2011	Majikoi	Gyoubu Shakadou	
2011	Mayo Chiki!	Nagare Konoe	
2011	Nurarihyon no Mago: Sennen Makyo	Rihan Nura	
2011	Tiger and Bunny	Jake Martinez	
2011	Toaru Majutsu no Index II	Amata Kihara	
2011	UN-GO	Yajima	
2011	Phi Brain: Puzzle of God	Kaidou Baron	
2011	Hourou Musuko	Shii-chan	
2011	Yondemasu yo, Azazel-san	Zeruel	
2012	Aquarion Evol	Zen Fudo	
2012	Bodacious Space Pirates	Hyakume	
2012	Eureka Seven AO	Renton Thurston	
2012	JoJo's Bizarre Adventure: The Animation	Esidisi	
2012	Jormungand	Dominique	
2012	Magi: The Labyrinth of Magic	Hinahoho	
2012	Monsuno	Jeredy Suno	
2012	Kokoro Connect	Ryuuzen Gotou	
2013	Attack on Titan	Captain Hannes	
2013	Blood Lad	Heads Hydra	
2013	Hajime no Ippo: Rising	Tatsuya Kimura	
2013	Log Horizon	Regan	
2013	Miss Monochrome: The Animation	Maneo, Narration	
2013	Outbreak Company	Matoba Jinzaburō	
2013	Pupipō!	Wakaba Papa	
2013	Senran Kagura Ninja Flash!	Kiriya	
2013	Tamako Market	Mamedai Kitashirakawa	
2013	Sunday without God	Julie Sakuma Dolievich	
2013	Koroshiya-san	Gorou	
2013	Samurai Flamenco	Boiling Rhino	
2013	Hakkenden: Eight Dogs of the East	Nachi Hinozuka	
2013	Maoyu - Archenemy & Hero	Archbishop	
2013	Devils and Realist	Balberith	
2013	Mushibugyou	Tokugawa Munenao	
2014	Donten ni Warau	Taiko Kumo	
2014	Mekakucity Actors	Kenjirō Tateyama	
2014	Psycho Pass 2	Sakuya Tougane	
2014	Tenkai Knights	Mr. White	
2014	World Trigger	Takumi Rindō	
2014	Gaist Crusher	Thomas	
2014	Bakumatsu Rock	Isami Kondou	
2014	Tokyo ESP	Juutarou Hiragi	
2014	Fairy Tail 2014	Mato / Toma E. Fiore	
2015	Gintama'	Hattori Zenzou	
2015	Blood Blockade Battlefront	Deldro Brody	
2015	Chaos Dragon	Simeon	
2015	Death Parade	Tatsumi	
2015	Itoshi no Muco	Bouda-san	
2015	Q Transformers: Return of the Mystery of Convoy	Megatron	
2015	Q Transformer: Saranaru Ninkimono e no Michi	Megatron	
2015	Monster Musume	Kasegi	
2015	Ninja Slayer From Animation	Silver Karasu/Kagi Tanaka	
2015	Prison School	Chairman	
2015	Seraph of the End	Tenri Hīragi	
2015	The Testament of Sister New Devil	Jin Toujou	
2015	Ushio and Tora	Shigure Aotsuki	
2015	Utawarerumono: Itsuwari no Kamen	Haku	
2015	Attack on Titan: Junior High	Hannes	
2015	Dance with Devils	Nesta	
2015	BAR Kiraware Yasai	Eggplant	
2016	Dagashi Kashi	Yō Shikada	
2016	Danganronpa 3: The End of Kibōgamine Gakuen	Koichi Kizakura	
2016	Magi: Adventure of Sinbad	Hinahoho	
2016	Sekkou Boys	Brutus	
2016	Tonkatsu DJ Agetarō	DJ Oily	
2016	Macross Delta	Berger Stone	Until ep.23
2016	Mob Psycho 100	Souchou	
2016	Re:Zero	Aldebaran	
2016	Neko mo, Onda-ke	Yoshito Onda	
2016	Joker Game	Masayuki Oikawa	
2016	Alderamin on the Sky	Bada Sankrei	
2016	Servamp	Higan	
2017	Blood Blockade Battlefront & Beyond	Deldro Brody	
2017	Elegant Yokai Apartment Life	Fujiyuki-sensei	
2018	Dagashi Kashi 2	You Shikada	
2018	Gintama: Shirogane no Tamashii-hen	Hattori Zenzou	
2018	Back Street Girls	Inugane	
2019	The Magnificent Kotobuki	Saneatsu	
2019	Kengan Ashura	Tokita Niko	
2019	One Piece	Ryokugyū	
2019	Granblue Fantasy The Animation Season 2	Eugen	
2019	Dr. Stone	Byakuya Ishigami	
2019	Cautious Hero: The Hero Is Overpowered but Overly Cautious	Demon Lord Xenosload	
2020	The House Spirit Tatami-chan	Karaoke Parlor Manager (final role)	
2020	Talentless Nana	Tatsumi Tsuruoka (posthumous role)	

=== Theatrical animation ===
Year	Title	Role	Notes/Refs
1993	Legend of the Galactic Heroes: Spiral Labyrinth	Frederick Jasper	
1993	Crayon Shin-chan: Action Kamen vs. Haigure Maou	Hiroshi Nohara	
1994	Dragon Ball Z: Bio-Broly	Men-Men	
1994	Crayon Shin-chan: Buriburi Oukoku no Hihou	Hiroshi Nohara	
1995	Crayon Shin-chan: Unkokusai no Yabou	Hiroshi Nohara	
1995	Crayon Shin-chan: Henderland no Daibouken	Hiroshi Nohara	
1997	Crayon Shin-chan: Ankoku Tamatama Daitsuiseki	Hiroshi Nohara	
1998	Doraemon: Nobita's Great Adventure in the South Seas	Mermaid	
1998	Mobile Suit Gundam: The 08th MS Team, Miller's Report	Eledore Massis	
1998	Crayon Shin-chan: Dengeki! Buta no Hizume Daisakusen	Hiroshi Nohara	
1999	Crayon Shin-chan: Bakuhatsu! Onsen Wakuwaku Daikessen	Hiroshi Nohara	
2000	Crayon Shin-chan: Arashi wo Yobu Jungle	Hiroshi Nohara	
2001	Sakura Wars: The Movie	Haruyoshi Tanuma	
2001	Initial D: Third Stage	Shingo Shouji	
2001	Vampire Hunter D: Bloodlust	Benge	
2001	Crayon Shin-chan: Arashi wo Yobu Mouretsu! Otona Teikoku no Gyakushuu	Hiroshi Nohara	
2002	Crayon Shin-chan: Arashi wo Yobu Appare! Sengoku Daikassen	Hiroshi Nohara	
2002	Camp Pikachu	Usokki	
2003	Crayon Shin-chan: Arashi wo Yobu Eikou no Yakiniku Road	Hiroshi Nohara	
2004	Crayon Shin-chan: Arashi wo Yobu! Yuuhi no Kasukabe Boys	Hiroshi Nohara	
2004	Blade of the Phantom Master	Munsu	
2005	Crayon Shin-chan: Densetsu wo Yobu Buriburi 3 Pun Dai Shingeki	Hiroshi Nohara	
2005	Fullmetal Alchemist: The Movie - Conqueror of Shamballa	Maes Hughes	
2006	Keroro Gunsou (movie 1)	Narration, Paul Moriyama	
2006	Final Fantasy VII Advent Children	Reno	
2006	Crayon Shin-chan: Densetsu wo Yobu Odore! Amigo!	Hiroshi Nohara	
2007	Keroro Gunsou: Shinkai no Princess de Arimasu!	Narration, Paul Moriyama	
2007	Crayon Shin-chan: Arashi wo Yobu Utau Ketsu dake Bakudan!	Hiroshi Nohara	
2008	Keroro Gunsou: Keroro Tai Keroro - Tenkuu Daikessen de Arimasu!	Narration, Paul Moriyama	
2008	Hells Angels	Who, Volleyball Referee	
2008	Crayon Shin-chan: Chou Arashi wo Yobu Kinpoko no Yuusha	Hiroshi Nohara	
2009	Crayon Shin-chan: Otakebe! Kasukabe Yasei Oukoku	Hiroshi Nohara	
2009	Keroro Gunsou Gekishin Dragon Warriors de Arimasu!	Narration, Paul Moriyama	
2009	Pyu to Fuku! Jaguar ~Ima, Fuki ni Yukimasu~	Jaguar Junichi	
2009	Eureka Seven: Pocket Full of Rainbows	Holland Novak	
2010	Keroro Gunsou Tanjou! Kyuukyoku Keroro Kiseki no Jikuujima de Arimasu	Narration, Paul Moriyama	
2010	Welcome to the Space Show	Pochi Rickman	
2010	Colorful	Mr. Sawada	
2010	HeartCatch PreCure The Movie: Fashion Show in the Flower Capital... Really?!	Baron Salamander	
2010	Crayon Shin-chan: Chou Jikuu! Arashi wo Yobu Ora no Hanayome	Hiroshi Nohara	
2011	Crayon Shin-chan: Arashi wo Yobu Ougon no Spy Daisakusen	Hiroshi Nohara	
2011	Kizuna Ichigeki	Kintarou Todoroki	
2011	Nintama Rantaro Ninjutsu Gakuen Zenin Shutsudou! no Dan	Yuzo Nomura	
2011	Precure All-Stars DX3 Mirai ni Todoke! Sekai o Tsunagu Niji-Iro no Hana	Baron Salamander	
2011	Buddha: The Great Departure	Bandaka	
2012	Blood-C: the last dark	Tadayoshi Kisaragi	
2012	Ao no Exorcist movie	Shiro Fujimoto	
2012	Crayon Shin-chan: Arashi wo Yobu! Ora to Uchuu no Princess	Hiroshi Nohara	
2012	Code Geass: Akito the Exiled - The Wyvern Arrives	Claus Warrick	
2013	Hunter × Hunter: Phantom Rouge	Leorio	
2013	Hunter × Hunter: The Last Mission	Leorio	
2013	Ryo	Ryoma Sakamoto	
2013	Crayon Shin-chan: Bakauma! B-Kyuu Gourmet Survival Battle!!	Hiroshi Nohara	
2013	Code Geass: Akito the Exiled - The Wyvern Divided	Claus Warrick	
2014	Buddha 2: Tezuka Osamu no Buddha - Owarinaki Tabi	Devadetta	
2014	Tamako Love Story	Mamedai Kitashirakawa	
2014	Bodacious Space Pirates The Movie: Abyss of Hyperspace	Hyakume	
2014	Space Battleship Yamato 2199 Odyssey of the Celestial Ark	Isami Enomoto	
2014	Crayon Shin-chan: Gachinko! Gyakushuu no Robo To-chan	Hiroshi Nohara	
2015	Miss Hokusai	Samurai, Bird dealer	
2015	The Anthem of the Heart	Kazuki Joushima	
2015	Air Bound	Ikasama	
2015	Crayon Shin-chan: Ora no Hikkoshi Monogatari - Saboten Daisuugeki	Hiroshi Nohara	
2015	Code Geass: Akito the Exiled - The Brightness Falls	Claus Warrick	
2016	Kingsglaive: Final Fantasy XV	Ardyn Izunia	
2016	Crayon Shin-chan: Bakusui! Yumemi World Dai Totsugeki	Hiroshi Nohara	
2018	Mazinger Z: INFINITY	Count Brocken	
2018	Hiragana Danshi	No's Father	
2018	Eureka Seven Hi-Evolution 2: ANEMONE	Dewey Novak	
2019	Birthday Wonderland	Zan Gu	
2019	Blackfox	Oboro	

=== Original video animation (OVA) ===
Year	Title	Role	Notes/Refs
1992	Gorillaman	Nakajima	
	Houkago no Tinker Bell	Koutatsu Okazaki	
1993	The Cockpit	Lieutenant Lambert	
1994	Kizuna: Bonds of Love	Kei Enjouji	
	Koukou Butou Den Crows	Naoki Senda	
1995	Golden Boy	Director Takikubo	
1996	Mobile Suit Gundam: The 08th MS Team	Eledore Massis	
	Birdy the Mighty	Masakubo	
1997	Alice in Cyberland	Torquemada	
	B'TX Neo	Ron	
	Eight Clouds Rising	Kitano-senpai	
1998	Shin Otokogi	Kudou	
2000	The Legend of the Galactic Heroes	Frederick Jasper	
2001	Angelique: Seichi Yori Ai wo Komete	Macnicole	
	Initial D Extra Stage	Shingo Shouji	
2002	Initial D Battle Stage	Shingo Shouji	
2003	Hajime no Ippo - Mashiba vs. Kimura	Tatsuya Kimura	
	Hare+Guu Deluxe	Tom	
2004	Kaleido Star: New Wings Extra Stage	Kalos Eido	
2005	Karas	Nue	
	Final Fantasy VII Advent Children Complete	Reno	
	Last Order: Final Fantasy VII	Reno	
	Kaleido Star: Legend of Phoenix - Layla Hamilton Story	Kalos Eido	
2006	Sky Girls	Soya Togo	
	Baldr Force EXE	Kuwong	
	Sin in the Rain	Kyosuke Takamizawa	
2008	Bounen no Xamdou	Raigyo Tsunomata	ONA
2009	Toriko	Tom	
2010	Bungaku Shoujo Memoir I - Yume-Miru Shoujo no Prelude	Fumiharo Amano	
	Mudazumo Naki Kaikaku: The Legend of Koizumi	Yukio Hatoyama	
2011	Blessing of the Campanella	Nick La'juck	
2012	Kyō no Asuka Show	Asuka's father	ONA
2013	Iron Man: Rise of Technovore	Iron Man/Tony Stark	
	Vassalord	Johnny Rayflo	Bundled with the ltd edition of the manga vol.7
	Donyatsu	Begar	ONA
2014	Juuza Engi Engetsu Sangokuden	Chouseihei (Zhang Shiping)	
	Magi: Adventure of Sinbad	Hinahoho	
	Avengers Confidential: Black Widow and Punisher	Iron Man/Tony Stark	
2019	Final Fantasy XV - Episode Ardyn: Prologue	Ardyn	

=== Video games ===
Year	Title	Role	Notes/Refs
1991	Sengoku Kanto Sangokushi	Narration	
1996	Keiō Yūgekitai: Katsugeki-hen	Fire Tanuki, Fishing Tanuki, Rikishi, Kurobei the Octopus, Hyottoko, Castle Promenade Tanuki, Ninjas, 3-meter Alien, Benkei Musashibō, Missionary Xavier, Daidarabotchi	
	Alice in Cyberland	Torquemada	
1997	Doukyuusei 2	Shinkansen Tendou	
1998	Real Bout Fatal Fury Special: Dominated Mind	White	
	Kindaichi Shounen no Jikenbo Hoshimijima Kanashimi no Fukushuu Oni	Yousuke Itsuki	
	SD Gundam G Generation	Eledore Massis	
	Dragonforce II	Fujimaru	
1999	Dungeon Keeper 2	Hero, Dark Angel	
	SD Gundam G Generation-ZERO	Eledore Massis, Ryou Roots	
	Legend of Himiko	Shudei	
2000	SD Gundam G Generation-F	Eledore Massis, Ryou Roots	
	Kaikan Phrase: Datenshi Kourin	Kudou	
	Brigandine: Grand Edition	Meleagant, Gish, Kazan	
2001	Growlanser II: The Sense of Justice	Maximillian Schneider, Patrick	
	Rockman X6	Gate	
	Giga Wing 2	Kurt Aishinkagura	
	SD Gundam G Generation-F.I.F	Eledore Massis, Ryou Roots, Noventa	
	Seigi no Mikata	Kouichi Mizuhara	
	Crayon Shin-chan Ora to Omoide Tsukuru zo	Hiroshi Nohara	
2002	Hikaru no Go - Heian Gensou Ibunroku	Michimasa Ogatano	
	Elysion	Alex	
	SD Gundam G Generation NEO	Ryou Roots	
	Hikaru no Go - Insei Choujou Kessen	Michimasa Ogatano	
	Ratchet and Clank	Weapon Salesman	
2003	Star Ocean: Till the End of Time	Lucifer Landberd, King Airyglyph XIII	
	Mega Man Network Transmission	PharaohMan	
	Hikaru no Go 3	Michimasa Ogatano	
	Initial D Special Stage	Shingo Shouji	
	Summon Night 3	Kyuuma	
	Ratchet and Clank: Going Commando	Weapon Salesman	
2004	Suikoden IV	Brandeau	
	Kingdom Hearts: Chain of Memories	Axel	
	Tenchu: Shadow Assassins	Onikage	
	SD Gundam G Generation SEED	Ryou Roots	
	Pyu to Fuku! Jaguar - Byou to deru ! Megane-kun	Jaguar Junichi	
	Fullmetal Alchemist: Dream Carnival	Maes Hughes	
	Fullmetal Alchemist: Curse of the Crimson Elixir	Maes Hughes	
	Keroro Gunsou: Mero Mero Battle Royale	Narration, Paul Moriyama	
	Pet Tantei Y's	Barious	
	Uchuu no Stellvia	Jinrai Shirogane	
	Metal Gear Solid 3: Snake Eater	Sigint	
2005	Ape Escape 3	Dr. Tomoki	
	Kingdom Hearts II	Axel	
	Radiata Stories	Thanos Benz, Gabriel Celesta	
	Romancing Saga: Minstrel Song	Darque	
	Fullmetal Alchemist 3: Kami wo Tsugu Shoujo	Maes Hughes	
	Cowboy Bebop: Tsuioku no Yakyoku	Steve Chase	
	Suikoden Tactics	Brandeau, Iskas	
	Eureka Seven TR1:NEW WAVE	Holland Novak	
	Keroro Gunsou: Mero Mero Battle Royale Z	Narration, Paul Moriyama	
	Demon Chaos	Yoshiteru Ashikaga	
	Yatohime Zankikou	Loup-Garou	under the alias 濱俊作
	Princess Concerto	Barnheim	
2006	Onimusha: Dawn of Dreams	Yagyu Munenori	
	Metal Gear Solid: Portable Ops	Sigint	
	Initial D Street Stage	Shingo Shouji	
	Suikoden V	Ferid, Killey, Cornelio, Bergen, Brandeau's Puppet	
	Dekaron	Vicious Summoner	
	Chou Gekijouban Keroro Gunsou: Enshuuda yo! Zenin Shuugou	Narration	
	Crayon Shin-chan: Densetsu wo Yobu Omake no Miyako Shokkugan!	Hiroshi Nohara	
	Kashimashi: Girl Meets Girl - Hajimete no Natsu Monogatari	Sora Hitoshi	
	SD Gundam G Generation Portable	Ryou Roots, Eledore Massis, Noventa	
	Kamizawa	Ainosuke	
	R.O.H.A.N	Human, Elf	
	Jeanne d'Arc	Richard	
	Crayon Shin-chan: Saikyou Kazoku Kasukabe King	Hiroshi Nohara	
	Black Cat: Kikai Shikake no Tenshi	Sven Vollfied	
2007	Luminous Arc	Leon	
	Crisis Core: Final Fantasy VII	Reno	
	Sengoku Basara 2	Matsunaga Hisahide	
	Everybody's Golf 5	Bloom	
	Initial D Arcade Stage 4	Shingo Shouji	
	Chou Gekijouban Keroro Gunsou: Enshuuda yo! Zenin Shuugou Part 2	Narration	
	Shijou Saikyou no Deshi Kenichi: Gekitou! Ragnarok Hachikengou	Loki	
	Crayon Shin-chan: Arashi wo Yobu - Nutte Crayon Daisakusen	Hiroshi Nohara	
	Dragon Quest Swords: The Masked Queen and the Tower of Mirrors	Aruval	
	Another Century Episode 3: The Final	Holland Novak, Kashimaru Bale	
	Tomb Raider: Legend	James Rutland	
	Gintama: Banji Oku Chuubu	Hattori Zenzou	
	SD Gundam G Generation SPIRITS	Ryou Roots, Eledore Massis	
	Himawari - Pebble in the Sky -	Daigo Amamiya	
	Jingi Naki Otome	Taisei Kitagawa	under the alias 子太明
	Black Cat: Kuroneko no Kyousoukyoku	Sven Vollfied	
	Nodame Cantabile	Manabu Sakuma	
	Umisho	Amuro's Father	
2008	Star Ocean: Second Evolution	Bowman Jean	
	Metal Gear Solid 4: Guns of the Patriots	Drebin	
	Suikoden Tierkreis	Danash VIII, Hotupa	
	Chou Gekijouban Keroro Gunsou 3 Tenkuu Daibouken de arimasu!	Narration, Paul Moriyama	
	Crayon Shin-chan: Arashi wo Yobu - Cinemaland Kachinko Gachinko Daikatsugeki !	Hiroshi Nohara	
	Higurashi no Naku Koro ni Kizuna	Touji Kimiyoshi	
	Kimi ga Aruji de Shitsuji ga Ore de	Isao Uesugi, Michael Plushenko	under the alias 子太明
	Sigma Harmonics	Ranpo Morito, Masked Butler	
	Super Robot Wars Z	Kashimaru Bale, Holland Novak, Furikku, Gagan	
	Akai Ito	Mei's Father	
	Mobile Suit Gundam 00	Ali Al-Saachez	
	Natsuzora Kanata	Sadamichi Ashikaga	under the alias 子太明
	Mobile Suit Gundam 00: Gundam Meisters	Ali Al-Saachez	
2009	Phantasy Star Portable 2	Kraz Muehler	
	Arc Rise Fantasia	Oigen	
	Marvel: Ultimate Alliance 2	Iron Man	
	Sengoku Basara: Battle Heroes	Matsunaga Hisahide	
	Kingdom Hearts 358/2 Days	Axel	
	Crayon Shin-chan: Arashi wo Yobu - Nendororon Daihenshin	Hiroshi Nohara	
	Chou Gekijouban Keroro Gunsou Gekishin Dragon Warriors de arimasu!	Narration, Paul Moriyama	
	Hyakko - Yorozuya Jikenbo	Kyouichiro Amagasa	
	Little Anchor	Alba Loren	
	Kazeiro Surf	Claus Udet	
	Ookamikakushi	Masaaki Kuzumi	
	SD Gundam G Generation WARS	Ryou Roots, Ali Al-Saachez	
	Bloody Call	Seizaburou Ogata	
	Shukufuku no Campanella	Nick La'juck	under the alias 子太明
	Kikouyoku Senki Tenkuu no Yumina	Karales	under the alias 子太明
	Flyable Heart	Shigeki Katsuragi	under the alias 子太明
2010	Armen Noir	Zecs/Alexandria	
	Castlevania: Lords of Shadow	Gabriel Belmont	
	White Knight Chronicles II	Scardigne	
	Kingdom Hearts Birth by Sleep	Lea	
	Resonance of Fate	Rowen	
	SIGMA HARMONICS Coda	Ranpo Morito, Masked Butler	
	Dengeki no Pilot Tenkuu no Kizuna	Barry	
	No Fate!: Only the Power of Will	Ichirou Mibu	
	Keroro RPG Kishi to Musha to Densetsu no Kaizoku	Narration	
	Hospital - 6-nin no Ishi	Gabriel Cunningham	
	Assassin's Creed: Brotherhood	Micheletto Corella	
	Akatsuki no Goei ~Tsumibukaki Shuumatsuron~	Tadao Souma	under the alias 子太明
	Evolimit	Earthquake	under the alias 子太明
	Kimi no Nagori wa Shizuka ni Yurete	Shigeki Katsuragi	under the alias 子太明
	Durarara!! 3-way Standoff	Kinnosuke Kuzuhara	
	Shukusai no Campanella	Nick La'juck	under the alias 子太明
2011	The Last Story	Jackal	
	Final Fantasy Type-0	Izana Kunagiri	
	Call of Duty: Modern Warfare 3	Vladimir Makarov	
	Gloria Union	Zazarland	
	Senran Kagura	Kiriya	
	Sengoku Basara Chronicle Heroes	Matsunaga Hisahide	
	Toaru Majutsu no Index	Amata Kihara	
	SD Gundam G Generation WORLD	Ryou Roots, Ali Al-Saachez	
	Phantasy Star Portable 2 INFINITY	Kraz Muehler	
	Are you Alice?	Dormouse	
	Kikokugai The Cyber Slayer	Bin Waison	
	Infamous 2	Cole MacGrath	
	Granado Espada	Ralph	
	Tantei-bu The Detective Club	Kei Seto	
	Dead End: Orchestral Manoeuvres in the Dead End	Miki Haisaka	
	Sengoku Basara 3 Utage	Matsunaga Hisahide	
	Mobile Suit Gundam Extreme Versus	Ali Al-Saachez	
	Shin Kamaitachi no Yoru: 11ninme no Suspect	Yuuta Ukai	
	SD Gundam Generation 3D	Ryou Roots, Ali Al-Saachez	
	Flyable CandyHeart	Shigeki Katsuragi	under the alias 子太明
	Aiyoku no Eustia	Gilbert dis Balstein	under the alias 長浜壱番
	Appare! Tenka Gomen	Saburou Nangoku	under the alias 子太明
	Gundam Memories: Tatakai no Kioku	Ali Al-Saachez	
	Tenshi no Hane wo Fumanai de	Teacher	under the alias 子太明
2012	PlayStation All-Stars Battle Royale	Cole MacGrath	
	Suikoden: The Woven Web of a Century	Jansen, Rodric	
	Super Robot Wars OG Saga: Masou Kishin II Revelation of Evil God	Goshin Orda	
	Armored Core V	Chief	
	Super Sentai Battle: Dice-O	Cheeda Nick	
	Maji de Watashi ni Koi Shinasai!! R	Gyoubu Shakadou	
	Kingdom Hearts 3D: Dream Drop Distance	Lea	
	Mobile Suit Gundam Extreme Versus Full Burst	Ali Al-Saachez	
	Juuzaengi ~Engetsu Sangokuden~	Chouseihei	
	unENDing Bloody Call	Seizaburou Ogata	
	Tokushu Houdoubu	Akio Sasori	
	Koisentai Love and Peace The P.S.P	Hiroshi Chidori	
	HUNTER X HUNTER Wonder Adventure	Leorio	
	Senran Kagura BURST - Shoujotachi no Shinei	Kiriya	
	SD Gundam G Generation OVER WORLD	Ryou Roots, Ali Al-Saachez	
	Tokumei Sentai Go-Busters	Cheeda Nick	
	Bravely Default: Flying Fairy	Ikuma Najitto/Ciggma Khint	
	Seifuku no Oujisama	Yuuichi Matsumoto	
	Kokoro Connect Yochi Random	Ryuuzen Gotou	
	School Wars	Daigo Kurobe	
	Your Diary	Chitose Minagawa	under the alias 子太明
	Appare! Tenka Gomen Matsuri ~Koi to Arashi wa Ooedo no Hana~	Saburou Nangoku	under the alias 子太明
	Maji de Watashi ni Koishinasai! S	Gyoubu Shakadou	under the alias 子太明
2013	BioShock Infinite	Booker DeWitt	
	JoJo's Bizarre Adventure: All-Star Battle	Esidisi	
	BlazBlue: Chrono Phantasma	Kagura Mutsuki	
	Double Score 〜Cosmos×Camellia〜	Takuto Sakita	
	Dragon's Dogma DARK ARISEN	Barroch	
	Tiny Machine The Game	Zen Midou	
	School Wars Sotsugyou Sensen	Daigo Kurobe	
	Code of Joker	Gunji Yamashiro	
	Super Robot Wars Operation Extend	Eledore Massis, Irvine	
	Rage of Bahamut	Zahar	
	Double Score 〜Cattleya×Narcissus〜	Takuto Sakita	
	Puppeteer	Mister G	
	Thousand Memories	Drake	
	Bravely Default: For the Sequel	Ikuma Najitto/Ciggma Khint	
	Shakadou-san no Jun'ai Road	Gyoubu Shakadou	under the alias 子太明
	Madou Koukaku ~Yami no Tsuki Megami wa Doukoku de Utau~	Gulandross Vasgan	under the alias 御田代紺
	Maji de Watashi ni Koishinasai! A-2	Gyoubu Shakadou	
	Walkure Romanze More&More	Akira Ryuuzouji	under the alias 子太明
	Hitotsu Tobashi Renai	Toshihiko Hatano	under the alias 子太明
2014	Granblue Fantasy	Eugen, Rivera	
	Kamen Rider: Battride War II	Cinema	
	Assassin's Creed Unity	Marquis de Sade	
	Freedom Wars	Carlos	
	Pokémon Omega Ruby and Alpha Sapphire	Carvanha, Sharpedo	
	Sengoku Basara 4	Matsunaga Hisahide	
	Tokyo 7th Sisters	First Manager	
	Gunslinger Stratos 2	Toranojou Mikage	
	Bakumatsu Rock	Isao Kondou	
	Mobile Suit Gundam Extreme Versus Maxi Boost	Ali Al-Saachez	
	J-Stars Victory Vs	Jaguar Junichi	
	Dekamori Senran Kagura	Kiriya	
	Crayon Shin-chan: Arashi wo Yobu - Kasukabe Eiga Stars	Hiroshi Nohara, Chicken, Future Hiroshi, Robot Dad	
	Super Robot Wars ZIII	Zen Fudou, Commander Tanaka	
	Super Smash Bros. for Nintendo 3DS (大乱闘スマッシュブラザーズ for Nintendo 3DS)	Mewtwo (Japanese version only)	
	Super Smash Bros. for Wii U (乱闘スマッシュブラザーズ for Wii U)	Mewtwo (Japanese version only)	
	Chronostacia	Horik Sol	
	Sword Art Online: Hollow Fragment	PoH	
	Mobile Suit Gundam Gaiden: Missing Link	Travis Kirkland	
	Urakata Hakuouki: Akatsuki no Shirabe	Kaishuu Katsu	
	BinaryStar	Jiro Hyuuga	
	Chaos Rings III	Al	
	Super Hero Generation	Arche Gundam	
	Shin Sekaiju no Meikyuu 2: Fafnir no Kishi	Beltran	
	Shironeko Project	Mauricio, Leorio	
	Hajime no Ippo	Tatsuya Kimura	
	LEGO Batman 3	Joker	
2015	LEGO Marvel Super Heroes	Iron Man	
	Yakuza 0	Homare Nishitani	
	Super Smash Bros. for Nintendo 3DS and Wii U	Mewtwo	
	Mobius Final Fantasy	Garland	
	Need For Speed	Travis	
	Batman: Arkham Knight	The Joker	
	League of Legends	Master Yi	
	Utawarerumono: Mask of Deception	Haku	
	Kenka Banchou 6: Soul and Blood	Momotarou Nanase	
	Durarara Relay!!!	Kinnosuke Kuzuhara	
	Far Cry 4	Pagan Min	
	Yume Oukoku to Nemureru 100-nin no Oujisama	Martin	
	Raishi	Houtou	
	Xenoblade Chronicles X	Lao	
	Mahoutsukai to Kuroneko no Wiz	Duga	
	The Legend of Heroes: Trails in the Sky	Nial Burns	
	Sengoku Basara 4 Sumeragi	Matsunaga Hisahide	
	Sen no Kaizoku	Gerald	
	7th Dragon III: Code VFD	Julietta, Character Creation	
	JoJo's Bizarre Adventure: Eyes of Heaven	Esidisi	
	Xucess Heaven Rebellion	General Manager	
	Puramai Wars	Seijurou Kita	under the alias 子太明
	Bloodborne	Walter	
2016	World of Final Fantasy	Ifrit	
	Final Fantasy XV	Ardyn Izunia	
	Utawarerumono: Mask of Truth	Oshutoru (Haku)	
	Chain Chronicle	Haku	
	Elder Scrolls Online	Emeric	
	Yome Collection	Sakuya Tougane	
	Moujuutachi to Ohime-sama	Barthold	
	World Chain	Robin Hood, Richard the 1st, Masashige Kusunoki	
	SD Gundam G Generation GENESIS	Travis Kirkland	
	Watch Dogs 2	Dusan Nemec	
	BlazBlue: Central Fiction	Mutsuki Kagura	
	LEGO Avengers	Iron Man	
2017	Nioh	Shima Sakon	
	Dia Horizon	Wolf	
	Code:Realize Shirogane no Kiseki	Miles Strand	
	Final Fantasy XV: Episode Ignis	Ardyn Izunia	
	YU-NO：A girl who chants love at the bound of this world	Koudai Arima	
2018	Gintama Rumble	Hattori Zenzou	
	Senran Kagura Burst Re:Newal	Kiriya	
	Final Fantasy XV: Pocket Edition	Ardyn Izunia	
	Utawarerumono: ZAN	Haku	
	Akane Sasu Sekai de Kimi to Utau	Tokugawa Mitsukuni	
	Hagun Sangokushi	Nanka Rousen	
	Super Smash Bros. Ultimate	Mewtwo	
2019	Final Fantasy XV - Episode Ardyn	Ardyn	
	Kingdom Hearts III	Axel (Lea)	
	Last Idea	TBA	
	Ghost Recon Breakpoint	Gregory Ballard	
2020	VR Kareshi	Yamashiro Yousuke	
	Final Fantasy VII Remake	Reno	
	A Certain Magical Index: Imaginary Fest	Amata Kihara	
	Shin Megami Tensei III: Nocturne HD Remaster	Kagutsuchi	
	Fairy Tail	Mato / Toma E. Fiore	
	Dokapon UP! Mugen no Roulette	Haku	Final recorded work
2021	Utawarerumono: ZAN 2	Haku	Archived audio
2022	Bravely Default: Brilliant Lights	Ikuma Najitto/Ciggma Khint	Archived audio
	JoJo's Bizarre Adventure: All Star Battle R	Esidisi	Archived audio
	Crisis Core: Final Fantasy VII Reunion	Reno	Archived audio
2023	Final Fantasy VII: Ever Crisis	Reno	Archived audio
	Star Ocean: The Second Story R	Bowman Jeane	Archived audio
	Granblue Fantasy Versus: Rising	Eugen	Archived audio
2024	Final Fantasy VII Rebirth	Reno	Archived audio
2025	Like a Dragon: Pirate Yakuza in Hawaii	Homare Nishitani	Archived audio
	Xenoblade Chronicles X: Definitive Edition	Lao	Archived audio
	Yakuza 0: Director's Cut	Homare Nishitani	Archived audio

=== Tokusatsu ===
Year	Title	Role	Notes/Refs.
2012–2013	Tokumei Sentai Go-Busters	Cheeda Nick	
2018	Kaitou Sentai Lupinranger VS Keisatsu Sentai Patranger en film	Jackpot Striker	

=== Dubbing roles ===
==== Live-action ====
TV dubs are listed by year of Japanese broadcast.
Year	Title	Role	Notes	Ref(s)
Voice dub for Robert Downey Jr.
2000	Johnny Be Good	Leo Wiggins	TV Tokyo dub	
2008	Iron Man	Tony Stark / Iron Man		
2008	The Incredible Hulk	Tony Stark		
2009	Sherlock Holmes	Sherlock Holmes		
2009	The Soloist	Steve Lopez		
2010	Due Date	Peter Highman		
2010	Iron Man 2	Tony Stark / Iron Man		
2011	Sherlock Holmes: A Game of Shadows	Sherlock Holmes		
2012	The Avengers	Tony Stark / Iron Man		
2013	Iron Man 3	Tony Stark / Iron Man		
2014	Chef	Marvin		
2014	The Judge	Henry "Hank" Palmer		
2015	Avengers: Age of Ultron	Tony Stark / Iron Man		
2016	Captain America: Civil War	Tony Stark / Iron Man		
2017	Spider-Man: Homecoming	Tony Stark / Iron Man		
2018	Avengers: Infinity War	Tony Stark / Iron Man		
2019	Avengers: Endgame	Tony Stark / Iron Man		
2020	Dolittle	Dr. John Dolittle		
Others
Year	Title	Role	Voice dub for / notes	Notes / Ref(s)
1990	Memphis Belle	Sergeant Clay	Harry Connick Jr.	
1992	The Mighty Ducks films	Gordon Bombay	Emilio Estevez	
	A Chinese Ghost Story II	Chi Chau	Jacky Cheung	TV Tokyo dub
	A Few Good Men	William T. Santiago	Michael DeLorenzo	
	To Protect and Serve	Egan	C. Thomas Howell	
	Used People	Frank	Joe Pantoliano	
1993	Alligator II: The Mutation	Rich Harmon	Woody Brown	TV Tokyo dub
	Loaded Weapon 1	Jack Colt	Emilio Estevez	
	Dillinger	Baby Face Nelson	Richard Dreyfuss	
	Coneheads	Carmine	Adam Sandler	
1994	Shallow Grave	Alex	Ewan McGregor	
	Le Grand Pardon	Le 'sacristain'	Richard Bohringer	
	The Air Up There	Jimmy Dolan	Kevin Bacon	
	Trapped in Paradise	Alvin Firpo	Dana Carvey	
	The Mask	Sweet Eddy	Denis Forest	
	Men of War	Po	BD Wong	
1995	Operation Dumbo Drop	Lawrence Farley	Corin Nemec	
	Dangerous Minds	Raul Sanchero	Renoly Santiago	
	The Brothers McMullen	Patrick McMullen	Michael McGlone	
	How to Make an American Quilt	Preston	Loren Dean	
1996	Bed of Roses	Lewis Farrell	Christian Slater	
	Bullet	Ruby Stein	Adrien Brody	
	Twister	Dustin Davis	Philip Seymour Hoffman	
	Courage Under Fire	Monfriez	Lou Diamond Phillips	
	Joe's Apartment	Joe	Jerry O'Connell	
	Bound	Johnnie Marzzone	Christopher Meloni	
	Star Trek: Deep Space Nine	Julian Bashir	Alexander Siddig	
	Swingers	Trent Walker	Vince Vaughn	
1997	Metro	Kevin McCall	Michael Rapaport	
	Street Fighter	Ken	Damian Chapa	TV Asahi dub
	Mimic	Josh	Josh Brolin	
	I Know What You Did Last Summer	Max Neurick	Johnny Galecki	
	The Man Who Knew Too Little	James Ritchie	Peter Gallagher	
	Inventing the Abbotts	Doug Holt	Joaquin Phoenix	
	Chasing Amy	Jay, Shawn Oran	Jason Mewes, Matt Damon	
	An American Werewolf in Paris	Andy McDermott	Tom Everett Scott	
	Scream 2	Joel	Duane Martin	
	The Practice	Bobby Donnell	Dylan McDermott	
1998	Knock Off	Han	Michael Wong	
	Wild Things	Sam Lombardo	Matt Dillon	
	The Red Violin	Frederick Pope	Jason Flemyng	
1999	Inspector Gadget	Gadget	Matthew Broderick	
	True Romance	Dick Ritchie	Michael Rapaport	TV Tokyo dub
	Election	Jim McAllister	Matthew Broderick	
	Boys Don't Cry	Lonny	Matt McGrath	
	Pushing Tin	Ron Hewitt	Matt Ross	
	Inferno	Matt Hogan	David 'Shark' Fralick	
	Gorgeous	Albert	Tony Leung	
2000	102 Dalmatians	Kevin Shepherd	Ioan Gruffudd	
	Dragonheart: A New Beginning	Drake	Robby Benson	
	Me, Myself & Irene	Charlie Baileygates/Hank Evans	Jim Carrey	
	Con Air	Francisco Cindino	Jesse Borrego	TV Asahi dub
	What Women Want	Morgan Farwell	Mark Feuerstein	
	Little Nicky	Nicky	Adam Sandler	
	Snatch	Vinny	Robbie Gee	
	Cecil B. Demented	Petie	Michael Shannon	
	Kippur	Weinraub	Liron Levo	
	Simon Sez	Macro	Ricky Harris	
2001	Thirteen Ghosts	Dennis Rafkin	Matthew Lillard	
	3000 Miles to Graceland	Hanson	Christian Slater	
	Blade	Dragonetti	Udo Kier	TV Tokyo dub
	L.A. Confidential	Ed Exley	Guy Pearce	Fuji TV dub
	Mercury Rising	Leo Pedranski	Bodhi Elfman	TV Asahi dub
	The Lost Empire	Monkey King	Russell Wong	
	Lara Croft: Tomb Raider	Mr Pimms	Julian Rhind-Tutt	
	Krai Thong	Krai Thong	Winai Kraibutr	
	The Pledge	Stan Krolak	Aaron Eckhart	
	The Deep End	Alek Spera	Goran Visnjic	
	Kate & Leopold	Phil	Matthew Sussman	
2002	Scooby-Doo	Norville "Shaggy" Rogers	Matthew Lillard	
	Octopus	Roy Turner	Jay Harrington	TV Asahi dub
	Blade II	Scud	Norman Reedus	
	The Pianist	Majorek	Daniel Caltagirone	
	Bend It Like Beckham	Joe	Jonathan Rhys Meyers	
	2009: Lost Memories	Sakamoto	Dong-gun Jang	
	Frasier	Niles Crane	David Hyde Pierce	
	The Sugarland Express	Clovis Michael Poplin	William Atherton	
2003	Identity	Edward "Ed" Dakota	John Cusack	
	Final Destination 2	Rory Peters	Jonathan Cherry	
	Inspector Gadget 2	Gadget	French Stewart	
	In the Cut	John Graham	Kevin Bacon	
	Platoon	Private Bunny	Kevin Dillon	TV Tokyo dub
	Enemy of the State	David Pratt	Barry Pepper	Fuji TV dub
	Matchstick Men	Franck Mercer	Sam Rockwell	
	Red Water	Emery Brousard	Rob Boltin	
	Max	George Grosz	Kevin McKidd	
	Head of State	Mays Gilliam	Chris Rock	
	Andromeda	Telemachus Rhade	Steve Bacic	
	Taken	Russell Keys	Steve Burton	
	Good Boy!	Hubble	Matthew Broderick	
2004	Scooby-Doo 2: Monsters Unleashed	Norville "Shaggy" Rogers	Matthew Lillard	
	Exit Wounds	George Clark	Isaiah Washington	NTV dub
	Wicker Park	Daniel	Christopher Cousins	
	Alien vs. Predator	Joe Connors	Joseph Rye	
	Little Black Book	Derek	Ron Livingston	
2005	Charlie and the Chocolate Factory	Willy Wonka	Johnny Depp	
	The Amityville Horror	George Lutz	Ryan Reynolds	
	Lords of Dogtown	Skip	Heath Ledger	
	Munich	Louis	Mathieu Amalric	
	Typhoon	Gang Se-jong	Jung-jae Lee	
	The Grid	Max Canary	Dylan McDermott	
	Lost	James "Sawyer" Ford	Josh Holloway	
2006	Unknown	Rancher Shirt	Barry Pepper	
	The Darwin Awards	Michael Burrows	Joseph Fiennes	
	Godsend	Paul Duncan	Greg Kinnear	
2007	Lucky You	Huck Cheever	Eric Bana	
	Lust, Caution	Mr Yee	Tony Leung	
	Van Helsing	Velkan Valerious	Will Kemp	TV Asahi dub
	Epic Movie	Willy Wonka	Crispin Glover	
	Alvin and the Chipmunks	Dave	Jason Lee	
	Death Defying Acts	Harry Houdini	Guy Pearce	
2008	The Dark Knight	The Joker	Heath Ledger	
	CJ7	Mr Cao	Sheung-ching Lee	
	Camp Rock	Brown Cesario	Daniel Fathers	
	RocknRolla	One Two	Gerard Butler	
	Frost/Nixon	James Reston Jr.	Sam Rockwell	
	Definitely, Maybe	Will Hayes	Ryan Reynolds	
	Nick and Norah's Infinite Playlist	Tal	Jay Baruchel	
	The Incredible Hulk	Leonard	Ty Burrell	
2009	Knowing	Professor Phil Beckman	Ben Mendelsohn	
	Watchmen	Doctor Manhattan	Billy Crudup	
	Alvin and the Chipmunks: The Squeakquel	Dave	Jason Lee	
	The Da Vinci Code	Silas	Paul Bettany	Fuji TV dub
	Casino Royale	Le Chiffre	Mads Mikkelsen	TV Asahi dub
	Shorts	Dr Noseworthy	William H. Macy	
	I Love You Phillip Morris	Steven Russell	Jim Carrey	
	Law Abiding Citizen	Nick Rice	Jamie Foxx	
2010	Alice in Wonderland	Knave of Hearts	Crispin Glover	
	Saw 3D	Bobby	Sean Patrick Flanery	
	Camp Rock 2	Brown Cesario	Daniel Fathers	
	The Bucket List	Thomas	Sean Hayes	TV Asahi dub
	Eat Pray Love	Stephen	Billy Crudup	
	Get Him to the Greek	Aldous Snow	Russell Brand	
2011	Hanna	Erik Heller	Eric Bana	
	The Great Magician	Chang Hsien	Tony Leung	
	Alvin and the Chipmunks: Chipwrecked	Dave	Jason Lee	
	Fast & Furious	Brian O'Conner	Paul Walker	TV Asahi dub
	The Muppets	Gary	Jason Segel	
2012	Dredd	Dredd	Karl Urban	
	Magic Mike	Dallas	Matthew McConaughey	
	Clash of the Titans	Ixas	Hans Matheson	TV Asahi dub
	Prometheus	Fifield	Sean Harris	
2013	Rush	Niki Lauda	Daniel Brühl	Japanese dub #2
	Transporter: The Series	Frank Martin	Chris Vance	
	Strike Back	Damian Scott	Sullivan Stapleton	
	Enemies Closer	Xander	Jean-Claude Van Damme	
2014	Dallas Buyers Club	Ron Woodroof	Matthew McConaughey	
	Helix	Peter Farragut	Neil Napier	
	Piégé (Trap)	Denis Guillard	Pascal Elbé	
	Deliver Us from Evil	Sarchie	Eric Bana	
	Hannibal	Frederick Chilton	Raul Esparza	
2015	Mr. Robot	Mr. Robot	Christian Slater	season 1 only
	The Sea of Trees	Arthur Brennan	Matthew McConaughey	
	Alvin and the Chipmunks: The Road Chip	Dave	Jason Lee	
	The Strain	Vasiliy Fet	Kevin Durand	seasons 1 & 2 only
	Scream Queens	Wes Gardner	Oliver Hudson	season 1 only
2016	The People v. O. J. Simpson: American Crime Story	O. J. Simpson	Cuba Gooding Jr.	
	Extant	JD Richter	Jeffrey Dean Morgan	
	Risen	Clavius Aquila Valerius Niger	Joseph Fiennes	
2019	Between Two Ferns: The Movie	Matthew McConaughey	Matthew McConaughey	
	The King	William Chief Justice	Sean Harris	

==== Animated ====
Year	Title	Role	Notes / Refs.
1992	TUGS	Big Mac, Sea Rogue, Little Ditcher, Frank, The Shrimpers	
1994	Pink Panther	Louie	
1997	Beast Wars: Transformers	Dinobot, Clone Dinobot	
1998	Toonsylvania	Fred Deadman	
1999	Paddington Bear	Paddington	
	Batman Beyond	Spellbinder/Ira Billings	
2000	The Rugrats Movie	Stu Pickles	
2002	101 Dalmatians II: Patch's London Adventure	Pongo	
	House of Mouse	Pongo	
2003	Bionicle: Mask of Light	Pohatu	
	Sinbad: Legend of the Seven Seas	Sinbad	
	Transformers: Armada	Scavenger (Japanese: Devastor)	
2005	The Batman	Rag Doll	
	D.I.C.E	Pike	
2007	The Boondocks	Ed Wuncler III	
	Teenage Mutant Ninja Turtles	Traximus	
2009	Batman: The Brave and the Bold	The Joker/Red Hood, Norville "Shaggy" Rogers	
2010	Transformers: Animated	Grimlock	
2011	Kung Fu Panda 2	Lord Shen	
2012	Transformers: Prime	Megatron	
2013	Lego Batman: The Movie - DC Super Heroes Unite	Joker	
2014	Avengers Confidential: Black Widow & Punisher	Iron Man	
2016	Lego DC Comics Superheroes: Justice League - Gotham City Breakout	Joker	
	Pokémon Generations	Detective Handsome	
2018	Next Gen	Justin Pin	

=== Narration ===
The below is a selection.

Year	Title	Notes/Refs
2010–2012	Ishikawa Ryou Special RESPECT	Golf show
2010	Gyakuryuu Shiraberu Travel	Variety Show
2011–2015	Mirai Seiki Zipangu	Economy Documentary Show
2012	Koi nante Zeitaku ga Watashi ni Ochitekuru no darouka?	TV Drama, 6 eps
2012–2013	Bakushou Gakuen Nasebara-ru	Program aimed at teenagers
2014	"SWEET ROAD TO YOUTH"-A Documentary Film featuring KOTARO FURUICHI & THE COLLECTORS-	
2017 -	Gekiroku: Keisatsu Micchaku 24-ji !	Police documentary show

=== Live-action ===
The following are physical appearances as opposed to voice work.

Year	Title	Role	Notes/Refs.
2010	Wonderful World	Nishikawa Yoshitaka	
2013	Tokumei Sentai Go-Busters Returns vs. Dōbutsu Sentai Go-Busters	Backpacker	
2014	Crayon Shin-chan: Serious Battle! Robot Dad Strikes Back TV commercials	Single Man	

== Discography ==
=== Drama CD roles ===
Year of Release	CD Title	Role	Note
1996	Mobile Suit Gundam Dai 08MS Shoutai REPORT series	Eledore Massis	
1999	Aisubeki Otokotachi no Love Songs series	Various	
	Initial D series	Shingo Shouji	
	Love Mode series	Katsura Takamiya	
2002	Hyakkiyakou-shou - Kogoeru Kage ga Yume Miru Mono	Tohru Adachi	
	Angel Howling series	Ulpen	
2003	Growlanser II series	Maximilian Schneider	
	HeatGuy J Original Drama Album	Ken Edmundo	
	Kaleido Star - Hajimete no Sugoi Mini Album	Kalos Eido	
2004	Warera no Mizu wa doko ni aru	Terasawa Seiichi	
	Fookies series	Tsuyoshi Kohinata	
	BEAST of EAST	Kamo no Mitsuyoshi	
	Galaxy Angel series	Volcott O'Huey	
	Onban Monogatari: Yakumo Tatsu Vol.1	Hideto Kitano	
	School Rumble series	Kouji Yakushamaru	
	Keroro Gunsou series	Narration, Paul Moriyama	
	Pyu to Fuku! Jaguar series	Jaguar Junichi	
2005	Trinity Blood File #03 "RADIO HEAD +more	Isaak Fernand von Kämpfer	
	Saiunkoku Monogatari Dai 2 kan Ogon no Yakusoku	Ensei Rou	
	Black Cat series	Sven Vollfied	Animate exclusive
2006	Shin Onimusha -Yagyu Jyube Akene no Tabidachi	Munenori Yagyuu	
	Kashimashi: Girl Meets Girl	Sora Hitoshi	
	Maromayu	Shop Manager	
	Vassalord series	Johnny Rayflo	
	Flower of Life	Koyanagi	
2007	Kikinosuke Gomen Oto No Ichiban - Dokumi No Kiki	Gennai Hiraga	
	Asagaya Zippy	Wakana Ihara	
	Drama CD Brave10	Juuzou Kakei	
	Captain HOOK love's lock series	Yomi	
2008	Kokaku Torimonochou	Hanada	
	Hatenkou Yuugi Vol.1	Rodley	
	Ogamiya Yokochou Tenmatsuki	Fumiyo Ichikawa	
	12 Nin no Yasashii Koroshiya series	Ryou Kuzuha	
	Original Drama Series Kyouen: "Kingyo," "Kansouki"		
	Are you Alice? series	Dormouse	
	Kiss x Kiss Collections vol.1: Otona no Kiss		
	Danza PLUS COPPERS	Tyler	
2009	KIsaragi	Ichigo-musume	
	Saint Butlers: Sumire no Taiko to Kuro no Karei	Douglas Black	
	Sengoku Basara vol.1	Hisahide Matsunaga	
	RE:BORN (Gackt album)	Arkaist	
	Radical Hospital series	Tadatsugu Sakaki	
	Kamisama no Memochou Drama CD	Masaru Hanada	
	Gekkou Kamen Begins - Satan no Tsume	Yuki Sakaki	
2010	Voice Colors Series vol. 06: Yakusoku		
	Wakakusa Monogatari	Mrs March	
	Kamisama no Inai Nichiyoubi	Julie Sakuma Dolievich	
	Sengoku Busho Monogatari - Gouketsu Hen 2	Narration	
	Bakumatsu Shishi Monogatari - Shinsengumi Hen	Isami Kondou	
	Meisaku Bungaku (Sho) vs Series Kitakaze to Taiyou	Traveller	
	Drama CD Asami Mitsuhiko Series Denkawa Densetsu Satsujin Jiken	Seta	
	Watashi no Shitsuji - On bitter Taste -		
	Itsuwari no Alkanet Voice Drama	Keiichiro Takatori	
	Shizukanaru Don	Shinpachi Ikura	
2011	Maruyama-Kun Ka no Nekotachi	Shuusuke Oohira / Sasuke	
	Reader Song: Love Letter 1 & 2		
	Kura x Raba - Fan wa, Kaku Katariki -	Shop Manager	
	Warumono (Warai) Series Wataru Seken wa Oni darake Hen	Red Devil	
	Armen Noir Drama CD	Zechs	
	Swiss Tokei no Nazo	Kazuki Misui	
	Senritsu no Stratos Rei	Hikoichi Muguruma	
2012	Oujisama Senka Vol.3: Restore the Bistro - Oujosama Funtoki	Ryuu Sakanoue	
	Anata ga Ofuro de Noboseru series	G	
	Tenshi x Akuma Drama CD 2	Mammon	
	Bungou series	Souseki Natsume	
	Soine Hitsuji CD vol.2 Yuuichi		
	Ikasama Hakurantei Drama CD 2	Ishiki	
	Double Score series	Takuto Sakita	
	Nurarihyon no Mago - Sennen Makyo: Onban Gekiwashou Vol.2 Edo no Hana Kurodabou no Kai	Rihan Nura	
	Kiss x Kiss Collections vol.20: Endless Kiss		
	ALCA - Yoake no Kuroto -	Keiichiro Takatori	
2013	Ikizukai series	Protagonist's Father	
	Teiden Shoujo to Hamushi no Orchestra Tachibana no Sho	Sakon	
	Hakui no Oujisama Matsumoto Yuuichi (53)	Yuuichi Matsumoto	
	Kyoufu Kaidan Oumagatoki vol.5	Narration	
2014	Sherlock Holmes series	Sherlock Holmes	
	Bravely Default Drama CD - Eternity No Udewa -	Ikuma Najitto/Ciggma Khint	
	Oujisama Factory Vol.3: Gofukuya Tachibana	Tetsuo Mitani	
	Ultra Kaijoshi	Ultraman Belial	Comiket 86 exclusive
2015	Oishuku Koisuru CD Love Cuisine - Monster Recipe - vol.5		
	Peace Maker series	Ryouma Sakamoto	
2016	Yume Oukoku to Nemureru 100 Nin no Oujisama - Oujisamatachi no Sweet de Bitter na Chocolate Zukuri -	Martin	
	CODE GEASS Akito the Exiled Sound Episode 3	Claus Warrick	
	Tsubaki No Ochiru Hi 4 - Mitsuai - Gaja Hen		

=== Character songs ===
Year of release	CD Title	Catalog Number	Track title	Notes
1993	Crayon Shin-chan	WPCL-783	Kita Saitama Blues	
1997	Crayon Shin-chan (4)	AMCM-4287	Semete Konya dake wa	with Miki Narahashi
1999	INITIAL D Vocal Battle	AVCT-15000	Don't stand so close	
	Aisubeki Otokotachi no Love Songs: Yotte Sawaide Dekoboko Combi	MECH-25101	Uchuugawa Elegy	
			Tomodachi to wa Otagai ni Anata wo Suki na Hito no Koto	with Hiro Yuuki
	Aisubeki Otokotachi no Love Songs 2: Oira Uchuu no Sukekomashi	MECH-25102	Yojouhan Rhapsody	
			Love Attack !	With Hikaru Midorikawa
	Aisubeki Otokotachi no Love Songs 3: Furusato nite	MECH-25103	Rainy Blues	
			Mirai	
			Original Heartbreak	with Takehito Koyasu
2001	Crayon Shin-chan Douyou Kikebaa	KICG-2040	Ouma wa Minna	
			Gohiki no Kobuta to Charleston	
2002	Galaxy Angel Character Series 06	LACM-4073	Tasogare Day Dream	
2005	Hagaren Song File - Maes Hughes -	SVWC-7277	Angel Heart	
			Soushite Kyou mo Sekai wa	
			Papa to Asobou	with Mayumi Yoshida
	Hagaren Song File - Best Compilation-	SVWC-7299	LAST MEETing	With Romi Paku, Rie Kugimiya, Megumi Toyoguchi & Tohru Ohkawa
			Good !	With Romi Paku, Rie Kugimiya, Megumi Toyoguchi & Tohru Ohkawa
2008	Hyakka Seiran Dansei Seiyuu Hen II	SVWC-7536	Winding Road / Mirrorman no Uta / Maaka na Scarf / Hajimete no Chuu / Yatsura no Ashioto no Ballad / Kaettekita Ultraman / Go Go Kikaider / Kyou mo Dokoka de Devilman / Yasashisa ni Tsutsumareta nara / Omoide ga Ippai	Cover Medley of Anime Songs
	Original Drama Series Kyouen [Kingyo] [Kansouki]	BMCA-1003	Tsuki no Shizuku	
2009	Little Anchor Original Soundtrack	KDSD-00287	Silent Word	
2010	Yojouhan Shinwa Taikei Original Soundtrack	KSCL-1613	Maru wo Sagashite	TV Anime The Tatami Galaxy Insert Song
2011	Mayo Chiki ! Character Song Album MayoUta!	KICA-3160	Dekiai Joutou !	
	HUNTER x HUNTER Character Songs 1	VPCG-84920	Leorio the HUNTER x DOCTOR	
	Tokumei Sentai Go-Busters Character Song Album	COCX-37722	One Wish, one Day	with Katsuhiro Suzuki
			Kizuna - Go-Busters ! (2012 Summer Movie Unit)	with Katsuhiro Suzuki, Ryouma Baba, Tesshou Genda, Arisa Komiya & Tatsuhisa Suzuki
2012	Appare ! Tenka Gomen Matsuri Soundtrack	BASREC-013	Ooedo Sanka - Shinbou Zaka-hen	Under the alias 子太 明
2013	Hakkenden -Touhou Hakken Ibun- Character Song Album vol.2	LACA-15352	Walk Together	
	Ojisama Senka Character Song Series 06	TRCD-10160	Dandelion	
	Tokumei Sentai Go-Busters Complete Song File	COCX-37758	Jingle Bells	
2014	Hoshi to Pierrot	PCCG-1416	Koi no Uta	Dynamite Beans version. TV Anime Tamako Market Insert Song
	Tamako Love Story Original Soundtrack	PCCG-1415	KOI NO UTA	Alt. Movie Version
2015	Bakumatsu Rock Ultimate Soul Mini Album	GNCA-7220	Hikari no Genseki	
2016	Sanbagarasu Otoko Uta - Granblue Fantasy	SVWC-70178	Sanbagarasu Otoko Uta	with Rikiya Koyama & Hiroki Yasumoto

== Video / Events ==
Year	Title	Catalog Number	Notes/Refs
2005	Fullmetal Alchemist Festival - Tales of Another	ANSB-1248	
2007	Basara Matsuri 2007 - Fuyu no Jin	CPBA-10036	
	Bakasawagi - Baccano ! DVD Release Commemoration Event	ANSB-2905-6	Digest included with Baccano ! DVDs vol.5 & 6
2009	Fullmetal Alchemist Festival '09	ANSB-5539	
	Are you Alice? Sweet Tea Party Music and Live - Honeyed Invitation	MESV-2	
	Basara Matsuri 2009 - Haru no Jin	BAMD-0001	
	Little Anchor - Dead or Live	D3PO-0011	Animate exclusive
2011	Ao no Exorcist - Blue Night Fes	ANSB-3845	
	Basara Matsuri 2011 - Natsu no Jin	BAMD-0004	
2012	Blood-C-arnival	ANZB-6895	Included on the limited edition DVD/BD of Blood-C: the Last Dark
	Fujiwara Keiji no Kore ga Yaritai - Kanto-hen	APLE-1	Variety DVD. With Takahiro Sakurai
2013	Basara Matsuri 2013 - Haru no Jin	BAMD-0007	

== Web radio hosting ==
Year	Name of the show	Notes/Refs
2007–2008	Fujiwara, Hirata no Sweet Tea Party	Are you Alice? themed show. With Hiroaki Hirata
2008–2011, 2013–2014	ANI-COM RADIO 〜 Fujiwara de Ii Kana 〜	with Kana Asumi
2008–2009	Hyakko - Tora no Ko Radio	
2008–2009	Shikabane Hime Radio 〜 Kochira Dainrinkan Housoukyoku 〜	with Nana Akiyama
2009	Vassalord Radio Station	with Ryoutarou Okiayu
2009	Mamachari to Chuuzai no Bokuchuu Radio	with Kenichi Suzumura
2009–2010	Miracle Train 〜 Shashoushitsu he Youkoso 〜	with KENN
2010	Arakawa FM	with Chiaki Omigawa

== Sound direction ==
Year	Title	Notes/Refs
2010	Kakkokawaii Sengen !	
2012	Maji de Otaku na English ! Ribbon-chan: Eigo de Tatakau Mahoushoujo	
2013	Angel Drop (special)	
2013	Pupipo !	
2015	BAR Kiraware Yasai	

== Substitutes ==
Below is a list of voice actors who stood in for him during his health-related hiatus (2016–2017), and after his death in 2020.

- Kenyū Horiuchi – Pokémon Generations: Handsome/Looker
- Hiroaki Hirata – Blue Exorcist: Kyoto Saga: Shirō Fujimoto
- Kenjirō Tsuda – Attack on Titan 2nd Season: Hannes, Space Battleship Yamato 2202: Warriors of Love, Isami Enomoto
- Toshiyuki Morikawa – Crayon Shin-chan series: Hiroshi Nohara, Eureka Seven Hi-Evolution: Holland Novak, Zenonzard the Animation: Hughtlom Aubreykahn, Marvel Cinematic Universe:Iron Man/Tony Stark
- Mitsuru Ogata – Macross Delta: Berger Stone
- Yasunori Matsumoto – Mr. Robot: Mr. Robot
- Kazuya Nakai – The Night Is Short, Walk on Girl: Seitaro Higuchi
- Kanehira Yamamoto – Senran Kagura: Peach Beach Splash: Mr. K (Kiriya)
- Jin Yamanoi – The Strain: Vasiliy Fet
- Kazuhiro Yamaji – Granblue Fantasy: Eugen (originally only on the first season of the anime)
- Rikiya Koyama – Dance with Devils: Fortuna: Nesta
- Kazuhiko Inoue – Scream Queens: Wes Gardner
- Tomokazu Seki – Re:Zero -Starting Life in Another World- Death or Kiss: Aldebaran
- Tōru Ōkawa - Laughing Under the Clouds: Taiko Kumou
- Fuminori Komatsu - Mobile Suit Gundam Side Story: Missing Link: Travis Kirkland
- Kentaro Tone - Utawarerumono: Haku (Used for extra scenes new to Utawarerumono ZAN 2/replaced entirely for the anime adaptation of Utawarerumono Futari no Hakuoro. Also used for other character variants in Utawarerumono: Lost Frag.)
