= Semai Sekai no Identity =

Japanese manga series

- First tankōbon volume cover

狭い世界のアイデンティティー (Semai Sekai no Aidentitī)
- Manga
- Written by: Rensuke Oshikiri
- Published by: Kodansha
- Magazine: Monthly Morning Two
- Original run: August 22, 2016 – June 22, 2020
- Volumes: 5

Semai Sekai no Identity (Japanese: 狭い世界のアイデンティティー, Hepburn: Semai Sekai no Aidentitī; "Small World's Identity") is a Japanese manga series written and illustrated by Rensuke Oshikiri. It was serialized in Kodansha's seinen manga magazine Monthly Morning Two from August 2016 to June 2020, with its chapters collected in five tankōbon volumes.

== Publication ==
Semai Sekai no Identity, written and illustrated by Rensuke Oshikiri, was serialized in Kodansha's seinen manga magazine Monthly Morning Two from August 22, 2016, to June 22, 2020. Kodansha collected its chapters in five tankōbon volumes, released from April 21, 2017, to September 18, 2020.

=== Volumes ===
No.	Japanese release date	Japanese ISBN
1	April 21, 2017	978-4-06-388722-8
2	March 23, 2018	978-4-06-511158-1
3	February 22, 2019	978-4-06-514643-9
4	December 23, 2019	978-4-06-518038-9
5	September 18, 2020	978-4-06-520748-2

== Reception ==
The series ranked first in the June 2017 edition of Takarajimasha's Kono Manga ga Sugoi! Web.

== See also ==
- Hi Score Girl, another manga series by the same author
- Pupipō!, another manga series by the same author
- Geniearth, another manga series by the same author
