= Geniearth =

Japanese manga series

- First tankōbon volume cover

ジーニアース
- Genre: Action; Science fiction
- Manga
- Written by: Rensuke Oshikiri
- Published by: Akita Shoten
- English publisher: NA: Titan Comics
- Imprint: Shōnen Champion Comics
- Magazine: Weekly Shōnen Champion
- Original run: September 16, 2021 – July 28, 2022
- Volumes: 5

Geniearth (Japanese: ジーニアース) is a Japanese manga series written and illustrated by Rensuke Oshikiri. It was serialized in Akita Shoten's shōnen manga magazine Weekly Shōnen Champion from September 2021 to July 2022, with its chapters collected in five tankōbon volumes.

== Publication ==
Written and illustrated by Rensuke Oshikiri, Geniearth was serialized in Akita Shoten's shōnen manga magazine Weekly Shōnen Champion from September 16, 2021, (Note: It started serialization in the magazine's 42nd issue of 2021, which was released on September 16.) to July 28, 2022. (Note: It finished serialization in the magazine's 35th issue of 2022, which was released on July 28.) Akita Shoten collected its chapters in five tankōbon volumes, published from February 8, 2022, to October 6, 2022.

On May 29, 2025, Titan Comics announced that they had licensed the series for English publication beginning in April 2026.

=== Volumes ===
No.	Original release date	Original ISBN	English release date	English ISBN
1	February 8, 2022	978-4-253-28161-4	June 16, 2026	978-1-787-74708-1
2	April 7, 2022	978-4-253-28162-1	—	—
3	June 8, 2022	978-4-253-28163-8	—	—
4	August 8, 2022	978-4-253-28164-5	—	—
5	October 6, 2022	978-4-253-28165-2	—	—

== See also ==
- Hi Score Girl, another manga series by the same author
- Pupipō!, another manga series by the same author
- Semai Sekai no Identity, another manga series by the same author
