= Crayon Shin-chan: Action Mask vs. Leotard Devil =

- Theatrical Release Poster

Japanese name
- Kanji: クレヨンしんちゃん アクション仮面VSハイグレ魔王
Transcriptions
- Revised Hepburn: Kureyon Shinchan: Akushon Kamen tai Haigure Maō
- Directed by: Mitsuru Hongo
- Written by: Yoshito Usui
- Screenplay by: Ryo Motohira
- Based on: Crayon Shin-chan by Yoshito Usui
- Produced by: Hitoshi Mogi; Kenji Ōta; Takashi Horiuchi
- Starring: Akiko Yajima; Miki Narahashi; Keiji Fujiwara; Tesshō Genda; Etsuko Kozakura; Hiroshi Masuoka; Nachi Nozawa
- Cinematography: Hideko Takahashi
- Edited by: Hajime Okayasu
- Production companies: Shin-Ei Animation; TV Asahi; Asatsu
- Release date: July 24, 1993
- Running time: 93 minutes
- Country: Japan
- Language: Japanese
- Box office: ¥2.22 billion ($17.4 million)

Crayon Shin-chan: Action Mask vs. Leotard Devil (クレヨンしんちゃん アクション仮面VSハイグレ魔王, Kureyon Shin-chan Akushon Kamen VS Haigure Maō), also known as Action Mask vs High - Gure Satan, is a 1993 Japanese anime film produced by Shin-Ei Animation. It is the first film based on the Crayon Shin-chan series.

== Plot ==
Action Mask's 'Action Stone' has been robbed by Leotard Devil (originally named Higure). Without the Action Stone, he cannot return to his world. So he chooses Shinnosuke and his family to get back his stone by making sure Action Card 99 (the most rare and valuable collectible in Choco Chips) ends up in the Choco Chip pack Shinnosuke purchases. One day, Shinnosuke and his family (his mother Misae, his father Hiroshi and his pet dog Shiro) travel to a beach for vacationing where they are sent to a parallel world by Action Mask and Mimiko without their knowledge.

The next day, they notice that half of Japan's population have been converted into Higure people through a beam that causes all humans to become Higures. Higure people then arrive to attack the Nohara Family, who is fortunately saved by the arrival of Ririko (Mimiko's twin sister). Ririko informs them that they are not in their own world. Dr. North Kasukabe (Action Mask's close acquaintance) also arrives and stores the second Action Stone in a candy wrapper while he goes to the loo. Unfortunately, Shinnosuke swallows the Action Stone, mistaking it for a candy.

The principal of Futaba Kindergarten (along with Shinnosuke's friends and teacher Ms. Yoshinaga) arrive warning the Nohara family about Higure's men's arrival. The Nohara family along with Dr. North Kasukabe, Ririko run to the bus. Suddenly, Higure Man's henchman Tea Pack Man arrives to steal the action stone but Shinnosuke wards him off. Along the way, Ume Matsuzaka (Shinnosuke's teacher) joins the group before learning all the information regarding the Action Stone.

They go to the secret laboratory of Dr. North Kasukabe where they are supposedly safe. Upon arrival, Matsuzaka reveals that she is a spy from the Higures before removing the special barrier protecting the laboratory. Then, the Rope Ladies and their team arrives (Higure's trustworthy). Ririko, Misae and Shinnosuke escape where the other people are attacked. Ririko leads Shinnosuke to a special tricycle. Then, Shinnosuke and Shiro move forward.

Shinnosuke along with Shiro and travels to Higure's base, with the tricycle empowering Shiro to talk and assist Shinnosuke and in operating the tricycle's arsenal. He defeats the Rope Ladies and Tea Pack man, the latter results in a huge explosion destroying the tricycle. Shiro then is no longer able to assist Shinnosuke any longer as Shinnosuke travels to Higure's base alone.

Shinnosuke confronts Higure. Higure takes out the action stone from his stomach and breaks it. Then a rumpus happen between them and original action stone gets revealed which Higure robbed from Action Mask. Shinnosuke uses the Action Stone to call Action Mask for help. Higure then challenges the duo to series of games, with the final one being a sword duel. After a long and tough battle, Action Mask seems to have been defeated, but he and Shinnosuke use the Action Stone to let out a powerful Action Beam that defeats Higure and then, he returns to his solar system. Then the Nohara family returns to their original world.

Later, Shinnosuke receives a special gift from Action Mask containing a costume of Action Mask.

== Cast ==
- Akiko Yajima as Shinnosuke Nohara
- Miki Narahashi as Misae Nohara
- Keiji Fujiwara as Hiroshi Nohara
- Mari Mashiba as Shiro and Toru Kazama
- Tamao Hayashi as Nene Sakurada
- Teiyū Ichiryūsai as Masao Sato
- Chie Satō as Bo Suzuki
- Rokurō Naya as Bunta Takakura (principal)
- Roko Takizawa as vice principal
- Yumi Takada as Midori Yoshinaga
- Michie Tomizawa as Ume Matsuzaka
- Tesshō Genda as Action Mask
- Etsuko Kozakura as Mimiko Sakura and Ririko Sakura
- Hiroshi Masuoka as Dr. North Kasukabe
- Nachi Nozawa as Leotard Devil
- Yō Inoue, Kumiko Watanabe, Sakurako Kishiro as Rope Ladies
- Daisuke Gōri as Baron Tasback
- Kazuhiro Nakata as Duplicate Action Mask
- Ken Yamaguchi as Director
- Naoki Bandō as Staff
- Chafurin as Razaya Dan (news reporter)
- Takeshi Aono as Professor Skeleton
- Tarō Arakawa as Butcher
- Hisako Kyōda as Grandma (disguised Mimiko)

== Staff ==
The names of the staff of the film are listed below:

- Original: Yoshito Usui
- Director: Mitsuru Hongo
- Screenplay: Ryo Motohira
- Character design: Hiroshi Ogawa
- Animation director: Noriyuki Tsutsumi, Katsunori Hara
- Cinematography: Hideko Takahashi
- Editor: Hajime Okayasu
- Sound adjustment: Nobuhiro Shibata, Hisashi Yamamoto, Takaaki Uchiyama
- Producer: Hitoshi Mogi, Kenji Ōta, Takashi Horiuchi
- Production companies: Shin-Ei Animation, TV Asahi, ADK

== Release ==
The film was released on 24 July 1993 in theatres in and released on DVD on 26 November 2010 in Japan. It was released in India on Hungama TV with the title Shinchan in Action Kamen and Higure Rakshas. It was released as Crayon ShinChan The Movie: Action Kamen VS Demon with English subtitles on VCD by PMP Entertainment.

== See also ==
- List of Crayon Shin-chan films
