= Pupipō! =

Japanese manga series

- Cover of Pupipō! volume 1 by Flex Comix featuring the protagonist Wakaba Himeji (right) and Pō-chan (left)

プピポー!
- Genre: Comedy horror, supernatural
- Manga
- Written by: Rensuke Oshikiri
- Published by: Flex Comix
- Magazine: FlexComix Blood
- Original run: April 11, 2007 – August 5, 2009
- Volumes: 3
- Anime television series
- Directed by: Kaoru Suzuki
- Written by: Motofumi Nakajou
- Studio: AIC Plus+
- Original network: TV Tokyo, AT-X
- Original run: December 20, 2013 – March 28, 2014
- Episodes: 15

Pupipō! (プピポー!) is a Japanese supernatural horror comedy manga series by Rensuke Oshikiri. It was serialized in Flex Comix's free web comic FlexComix Blood from April 11, 2007, to August 5, 2009. It was collected in three tankōbon volumes from March 6, 2008, to November 10, 2009. A 15-episode anime television series adaptation by AIC Plus+ aired between December 20, 2013, and March 28, 2014, on TV Tokyo.

== Characters ==
Wakaba Himeji (姫路 若葉, Himeji Wakaba)
Voiced by: Shiho Sasaki
A third grader who is a quiet and humble girl. Because she can see things no one else can see, she is called a liar and a witch by other people in her class.
Pō-chan (ポーちゃん)
Voiced by: Chisato Mori
An unknown creature who protects Himeji from the supernaturals manifestations and curses. He can absorb ghosts.
Wakaba Papa (パパ)
Voiced by: Keiji Fujiwara
Wakaba Mama (ママ)
Voiced by: Misao
Reiko Azuma (東 礼子, Azuma Reiko)
Voiced by: Mai Goto
Miyori Sonoda (園田 美代理, Sonoda Miyori)
Voiced by: Hanae Ōkubo
Ryōhei Ameyama (雨山 良平, Ameyama Ryōhei)
Voiced by: Setsuo Itō
Naoya Yūki (結城 直哉, Yūki Naoya)
Voiced by: Kotomi Ōtsuka
Bakuzan-sensei (爆散先生)
Voiced by: Tadashi Miyazawa

== Media ==
=== Manga ===
No.	Release date	ISBN
1	March 6, 2008	978-4-593-85617-6
2	January 7, 2009	978-4-593-85618-3
3	November 10, 2009	978-4-593-85619-0

== See also ==
- Hi Score Girl, another manga series by Rensuke Oshikiri
- Semai Sekai no Identity, another manga series by Rensuke Oshikiri
- Geniearth, another manga series by Rensuke Oshikiri
