= Ryo Motohira =

Japanese anime director and priest (born 1954)

- もとひら 了
- Born: Zuiryō Motohira (原平 随了); 1954 (age 71–72); Himi, Toyama Prefecture
- Occupations: priest; anime director; screenwriter
- Years active: 1970–2005
- Known for: Chief director of Doraemon (1981-1984)
- Spouse: Chikako

Zuiryō Motohira (原平 随了, Motohira Zuiryō; born 1954), known professionally as Ryo Motohira (もとひら 了, Motohira Ryō), is a Japanese Jōdo Shinshū Buddhist priest of the Kozenji Temple, former anime director, and former screenwriter from Himi, Toyama Prefecture.

== Biography ==
At Shin-Ei Animation, Motohira worked as an assistant director and production coordinator.

He famously served as the chief director of the Doraemon anime series from 1981 to 1984, with Tsutomu Shibayama taking over for the rest of the show's run. After departing, he became a freelance screenwriter.

Motohira has written several screenplays for numerous anime film and anime series works such as Doraemon: The Record of Nobita's Parallel Visit to the West, Dorami-chan: Mini-Dora SOS!!!, Esper Mami, Crayon Shin-chan: Action Mask vs. Leotard Devil, and 21 Emon.

In 2003, his mother died, leaving his father Akira, the head priest of Kozenji Temple, living alone. After completing a year of training at the Tokyo Buddhist College at Tsukiji Hongan-ji, Motohira officially became a priest at Kozenji Temple in 2005 and currently serves as head priest of the temple.

He retired from the anime industry after writing the screenplay for the feature film Crayon Shin-chan: The Legend Called: Dance! Amigo!, released in 2006.

== Filmography ==
=== Television animation ===
- Doraemon (1979–2005): Chief director, screenplay, storyboard, performance (1981-1984)
- Onegai! Samia-don (1985–1986): Screenplay
- Mock & Sweet (1986–1987): Storyboard, performance
- Esper Mami (1987–1989): Screenplay
- Chimpui (1989–1991): Screenplay
- Fun & Study in the Marvel of Beginnings (1989–1991): Screenplay
- 21 Emon (1991–1992): Screenplay
- Crayon Shin-chan (1992–present): Screenplay
- Adventures of Huckleberry Finn (1994–1995): Screenplay
- Soar High! Isami (1995–1996): Screenplay
- YAT Anshin! Uchū Ryokō (1996–1998): Screenplay
- KochiKame: Tokyo Beat Cops (1996–2004): Screenplay
- HARELUYA II BØY (1997): Screenplay
- Transformers: Armada (2002–2003): Screenplay, head writer

=== Theatrical animation ===
- Doraemon: The Record of Nobita's Parallel Visit to the West (1988): Screenplay
- Dorami-chan: Mini-Dora SOS!!! (1989): Screenplay
- Crayon Shin-chan: Action Mask vs. Leotard Devil (1993): Screenplay
- Crayon Shin-chan: The Legend Called: Dance! Amigo! (2006): Screenplay

=== Original video animation (OVA) ===
- Dokudami Tenement (1989–1990): Screenplay
- St. Michael School Drifting Story (1990): Screenplay
- Hyper Doll (1995): Screenplay
