= Hi Score Girl =

Japanese manga series

- Cover of the first tankōbon volume of Hi Score Girl, featuring Haruo Yaguchi (left) and Akira Ono (right)

ハイスコアガール (Hai Sukoa Gāru)
- Genre: Romantic comedy
- Manga
- Written by: Rensuke Oshikiri
- Published by: Square Enix
- English publisher: NA: Square Enix Manga & Books
- Magazine: Monthly Big Gangan
- Original run: October 25, 2010 – September 25, 2018
- Volumes: 10
- Anime television series
- Directed by: Yoshiki Yamakawa
- Written by: Tatsuhiko Urahata
- Music by: Yoko Shimomura
- Studio: J.C.Staff; SMDE
- Licensed by: Netflix
- Original network: Tokyo MX, MBS, BS11
- Original run: July 13, 2018 – December 20, 2019
- Episodes: 21 + 3 OVAs
- Manga

Hi Score Girl Dash
- Written by: Rensuke Oshikiri
- Published by: Square Enix
- Magazine: Monthly Big Gangan
- Original run: December 25, 2019 – present
- Volumes: 8
- icon

Hi Score Girl (ハイスコアガール, Hai Sukoa Gāru) is a Japanese manga series written and illustrated by Rensuke Oshikiri that ran from October 2010 to September 2018. The story revolves around the life of gamer Haruo Yaguchi, the arcade game scene of the 1990s (particularly fighting games), and his relationship with quiet gamer Akira Ono, as we follow the characters from about age 12 to about age 17. Known as a 1990s arcade romantic comedy, the series is notable for its unique art style, and very precise depictions of the multitude of gaming software and hardware featured. An anime television series adaptation by J.C.Staff and SMDE aired from July to September 2018. A second season aired from October to December 2019.

== Plot ==
Haruo Yaguchi, a loner elementary school student in 1991, finds refuge in video games, particularly arcade games. Having no friends in school, he barely has relationships with anyone. This begins to change when, one day, he sees his classmate Akira Ono playing Street Fighter II at an arcade. Having only known Akira as a rich girl of few words, he is shocked to see her not only playing games but also being good at them. After challenging her to multiple games of Street Fighter, where she wins 30 times, he vows to beat her one day. However, after the incident, the two polar opposites find themselves becoming close friends, with the two finding a shared interest in gaming despite their differences.

== Characters ==
Haruo Yaguchi (矢口 春雄（やぐち はるお）, Yaguchi Haruo)/Haruo (ハルオ, Haruo)
Voiced by: Kōhei Amasaki (Japanese); Johnny Yong Bosch (English)
A young man with an affinity for gaming, nicknamed "Beastly Fingers Haruo". He met his match during a fateful encounter with Akira Ono while playing Street Fighter II. Undeterred after losing, he still sees her as an opponent he must challenge and eventually beat. While he starts as a snarky brat with an ego, he eventually grows out of it. However, he never abandons his dedication and love for gaming, which almost borders on unhealthy obsession. On the bright side, this pure passion for gaming is what leads him to find some of his closest friends.
Akira Ono (大野 晶（おおの あきら）, Ōno Akira)
Voiced by: Sayumi Suzushiro (Japanese); Christine Marie Cabanos (English)
A daughter of the Ono Zaibatsu, Akira is rich, popular, and multi-talented – the polar opposite of Haruo. To escape the strict educational regimen she faces at home, she sneaks away to play in arcades where she showcases her exceptional gaming ability. She initially encounters Haruo during a match of Street Fighter II, and bonds with him over their love for gaming. She never talks and communicates solely through gestures and facial expressions. She also appears as a guest support character in Million Arthur: Arcana Blood.
Koharu Hidaka (日高 小春（ひだか こはる）, Hidaka Koharu)
Voiced by: Yuuki Hirose (Japanese); Erika Harlacher (English)
Introduced as a junior high classmate of Haruo, Hidaka was introverted, lonely and mainly studied. However, during the years when Ono is forced to be overseas by the Ono family, Hidaka begins spending time with Haruo after Hidaka's family store adds arcade machines. Hidaka's natural instinct for fighting games proves to be almost as remarkable as Ono's. As the third person in the love triangle, her battles with both Haruo and Oono are eventually realized as fateful video game battles. Nikotama, leader of the local gaming team, mentors Koharu. In Hi Score Girl Dash, a spinoff manga, we meet Hidaka as a mature woman who has become a middle-school teacher.
Koharu's parents (小春の両親)
Hidaka Shop's operators.
Kotaro Miyao (宮尾 光太郎（みやお こうたろう）, Miyao Kōtarō)
Voiced by: Kazuyuki Okitsu (Japanese); Lucien Dodge (English)
One of Haruo's classmates during junior high and high school who is his best friend. He also enjoys arcades, though not to the same degree as Haruo. He has a knack for attracting the ladies, and is quick to pick up on the bizarre love triangle formed by his classmates.
Reiko Toono (遠野 麗子（とおの れいこ）, Toono Reiko)
Haruo's middle school years classroom 2-3 teacher.
Genta Doi (土井 玄太（どい げんた）, Doi Genta)
Voiced by: Daiki Yamashita (Japanese); Kyle McCarley (English)
Haruo's classmate in classroom 6-2 and again in high school. A snobby kid who tries to come off as cultured and suave, his attempts to woo Akira are met with failure. During high school, he begins to hang around Haruo and Miyao.
Moemi Goda (業田 萌美（ごうだ もえみ）, Gōda Moemi)
Voiced by: Shizuka Itō (Japanese); Cherami Leigh (English)
The bespectacled official instructor of the Ono household. A totalitarian authoritarian who will stop at nothing to make sure Akira is nothing short of perfect and worthy as an heir to the Ono family name, she is absolutely against any kind of fun within the Ono household, which creates friction amongst its inhabitants. After seeing the effect Haruo's had on Akira and the error of her ways, she begins to relent a little, with emphasis on the word "little". If one doesn't work hard enough, she piles on more work. If one works too hard, she rewards them by piling on more work.
Chihiro Onizuka (鬼塚 ちひろ（おにづか ちひろ）, Onizuka Chihiro)
Voiced by: Daria Mido (Japanese); Cristina Vee (English)
A girl who went to school with Haruo from elementary to junior high, then seen at the same all-girl high school with Koharu. She is grotesque in appearance and crass in demeanor, though she apparently isn't self aware of that. She also has a noticeable lisp.
Namie Yaguchi (矢口 なみえ（やぐち なみえ）, Yaguchi Namie)
Voiced by: Satomi Arai (Japanese); Cindy Robinson (English)
Haruo's energetic mother. (The disposition of Yagouchi's father is unknown and deliberately never mentioned in the show or anime; he may be deceased, divorced or perhaps simply absent due to work.) Despite his shortcomings, she's very supportive of her son in her own quirky and loving manner. Whenever there's company, she's quick to offer her special stack of "Hotcakes Straight from a Manga".
Jiya (じいや, Jiiya)
Voiced by: Chō (Japanese); Joe Ochman (English)
An elderly man that works as Akira's chauffeur. He is a self-proclaimed pachinko addict, and has a nasty habit of running over Haruo with the family limousine.
Makoto Ono (大野 真（おおの まこと）, Ōno Makoto)
Voiced by: Chinatsu Akasaki (Japanese); Cristina Vee (English)
Late in season one, Haruo is shocked to learn that Akira has an older sister, the similar-looking but very different college-age Ono Makoto. Makoto, both flakey and defiant, explicitly rejects the harsh responsibilities of the Ono family. Those responsibilities fall to Akira, when Akira is just a grade-schooler. Conflicted by the effect of her actions, Makoto interacts with the three main characters, the school-friends, and Haruo's mother, in Makoto's attempts to support Akira's side in the final years of the love triangle. The Makoto character oscillates between broad comedy and the most intense moments of the story.
Numata (沼田（ぬまた）先生, Numata)
Voiced by: Yuichi Nakamura (Japanese); Joe Ochman (English)
A guidance counselor at Haruo's middle school, who likes to play video games as well. He resembles Lau Chan from Virtua Fighter series.
Felicia Nikotama (二子玉川 フェリシア（ふたこたまがわ フェリシア）, Nikotamagawa Felicia)
Voiced by: Shiori Izawa (Japanese); Reba Buhr (English)
Daughter of an arcade proprietor, Felicia is the head of the "Mizonokuchi Force", a band of gamers who operate in Kawasaki City. She takes Koharu under her wing after witnessing her skill.
Aulbath Ōimachi
Voiced by: Takuma Terashima (Japanese); Erik Scott Kimerer (English)
Sagat Takdanobaba
Voiced by: Kenichi Suzumura (Japanese); Tony Azzolino (English)
Blanka Kuhombutsu
Voiced by: Junichi Suwabe (Japanese); Kyle McCarley (English)
Sasquatch Tamagawagakuenmae
Voiced by: Kenshō Ono

=== Video game characters ===
Various video game characters were credited for redubbing for the television series, except for Phobos/Huitzil, Driver, Hell Chaos, EDI.E, Holmes, Watson, and Geese.

==== Street Fighter ====
Guile (ガイルさん)
A USA fighter introduced in Street Fighter II: The World Warrior. The voices of 'Sonic Boom' and 'Faneffu' were dubbed for the television series.
Zangief (ザンギエフさん)
A Soviet Union fighter introduced in Street Fighter II: The World Warrior, and Akira's favourite character.
Gouki (豪鬼さん)/Akuma
A hidden character from Japan, introduced in Super Street Fighter II Turbo.
Edmund Honda (エドモンド本田さん)
A Japanese fighter introduced in Street Fighter II: The World Warrior.
Dhalsim (ダルシムさん)
An Indian fighter introduced in Street Fighter II: The World Warrior.
Blanka (ブランカさん)
A Brazilian fighter introduced in Street Fighter II: The World Warrior.
Chun Li (春麗さん)
A Chinese fighter introduced in Street Fighter II: The World Warrior.
Vega (ベガさん)/M.Bison
A fighter from the Thailand stage, introduced in Street Fighter II: The World Warrior.
Nash (ナッシュさん)/Charlie
A USA fighter introduced in Street Fighter Alpha: Warriors' Dreams.

==== Final Fight ====
Damnd (ダムドさん)
A Final Fight Round 1 boss.
EDI.E (エディ.E)
A Final Fight Round 3 boss.
Haggar (ハガーさん)
A Final Fight playable character.

==== Darkstalkers ====
Phobos (フォボスさん)/Huitzil
A Darkstalkers fighter, and Koharu's favourite character.
Bishamon (ビシャモン)
A Darkstalkers fighter.
Victor (ヴィクトル)
A Darkstalkers fighter.

==== Ghosts 'n Goblins ====
Arthur (アーサーさん)
The player character from Ghosts 'n Goblins.

==== Out Run ====
Driver (ドライバー)
The driver from Out Run.

==== Puzzle & Action: Tant-R ====
Holmes (ホームズ)
A detective from Puzzle & Action: Tant-R, resembles Sherlock Holmes.
Watson (ワトスン)
A detective from Puzzle & Action: Tant-R, resembles Dr. Watson.

==== Genpei Tōma Den ====
Andaba (安駄婆（あんだばあ）)
A Genpei Tōma Den character.
Yoritomo (頼朝さん)
A Genpei Tōma Den stage 46 (Kamakura) boss.

==== Puzzle Bobble ====
Bubloon (バブルン)/Bub
The green dinosaur player character in Puzzle Bobble.

==== Fatal Fury ====
Geese (ギース)
A Fatal Fury fighter.

==== Splatterhouse ====
Hell Chaos (ヘルカオス)
The Splatterhouse stage 7 final boss.

==== Hammerin' Harry ====
Gen (源さん)/Harry
The player character from Hammerin' Harry.

=== Gaming machines ===
Game Boy (ゲームボーイ君)
Sufami (スーファミ君)
PC Engine (PCエンジン君)
Haruo's video game devices.

== Media ==
=== Manga ===
Oshikiri launched the manga in Square Enix's Monthly Big Gangan on October 25, 2010, and ended its serialization on September 25, 2018, in the tenth 2018 issue of the magazine. The series has been published in ten tankōbon volumes, with the first volume released on February 25, 2012, and the tenth and final volume released on March 25, 2019.

Square Enix Manga & Books licensed the manga in English, with the first volume released on February 25, 2020, and the last on January 17, 2023.

A spin-off, titled Hi Score Girl Dash, focusing on Koharu Hidaka, now a middle school teacher, started in Monthly Big Gangan on December 25, 2019.

==== Volumes ====
No.	Original release date	Original ISBN	English release date	English ISBN
1	February 25, 2012 (Note: Volumes 1–5 were re-released on July 25, 2016 as Hi Score Girl CONTINUE)	978-4-7575-3512-1; 978-4-7575-5039-1 (Cont.)	February 25, 2020	978-1-64609-016-7
Chapters 1–9
2	June 25, 2012	978-4-7575-3642-5; 978-4-7575-5040-7 (Cont.)	March 24, 2020	978-1-64609-017-4
Chapters 10–15
3	December 25, 2012	978-4-7575-3841-2; 978-4-7575-5041-4 (Cont.)	July 28, 2020	978-1-64609-018-1
Chapters 16–21
4	June 25, 2013	978-4-7575-3956-3; 978-4-7575-5042-1 (Cont.); 978-4-7575-3959-4 (LE)	October 27, 2020	978-1-64609-019-8
Chapters 22–27
5	December 25, 2013	978-4-7575-4188-7; 978-4-7575-5043-8 (Cont.); 978-4-7575-4161-0 (LE)	January 5, 2021	978-1-64609-020-4
Chapters 28–33
6	July 25, 2016	978-4-7575-5044-5	April 27, 2021	978-1-64609-021-1
Chapters 34–40
7	January 25, 2017	978-4-7575-5227-2	August 10, 2021	978-1-64609-022-8
Chapters 41–45
8	March 24, 2018	978-4-7575-5679-9	December 7, 2021	978-1-64609-023-5
Chapters 46–51
9	June 25, 2018	978-4-7575-5768-0	October 11, 2022	978-1-64609-024-2
Chapters 52–57
10	March 25, 2019	978-4-7575-6076-5	January 17, 2023	978-1-64609-025-9
Chapters 58–63

Hi Score Girl Dash

No.	Japanese release date	Japanese ISBN
1	March 25, 2021	978-4-7575-7021-4
2	September 25, 2021	978-4-7575-7398-7
3	June 23, 2022	978-4-7575-7941-5
4	March 25, 2023	978-4-7575-8429-7
5	December 25, 2023	978-4-7575-8926-1
6	September 25, 2024	978-4-7575-9442-5
7	June 25, 2025	978-4-7575-9916-1
8	April 24, 2026	978-4-301-00480-6

=== Anime ===
Monthly Big Gangan announced in December 2013 that an anime adaptation was green-lit. In March 2018, the anime adaptation was confirmed to be a television series animated by SMDE, with production by J.C. Staff. It aired from July 13 to September 28, 2018. It is directed by Yoshiki Yamakawa and written by Tatsuhiko Urahata, featuring character designs by Michiru Kuwabata, and music by Yoko Shimomura. The series runs at 60fps (mainly for the game footage, due to having a 60hz rate) in selected scenes, as opposed to 24fps (although it was encoded at 30fps). The series' opening theme song "New Stranger" was performed by Sora tob sakana, while the series' ending theme song "Hōkago Distraction" was performed by Etsuko Yakushimaru. Netflix streamed the anime on December 24, 2018, with an English dub. The series received three OVA episodes titled Extra Stage that premiered on March 20, 2019.

A second, nine episode long season aired from October 25 to December 20, 2019, with the staff and cast reprising their roles. The second season's opening theme song "Flash" was performed by Sora tob sakana, while the second season's ending theme song "Unknown World Map" was performed by Etsuko Yakushimaru. Season 2 premiered on Netflix on April 9, 2020, outside of Japan and China.

== Reception ==
Hi Score Girl won the Tokyo News Services' TV Bros magazine Bros. Comic Award 2012. It was number two on the 2013 Takarajimasha's Kono Manga ga Sugoi! Top 20 Manga for Male Readers survey. It was also nominated for the 6th Manga Taishō and the 17th Tezuka Osamu Cultural Prize. It was number nine in the 2013 Comic Natalie Grand Prize.

As of December 30, 2012, volume 3 has sold 59,016 copies and as of July 7, 2013, volume 4 has sold 103,734 copies.

== Legal issues ==
On August 5, 2014, Osaka District Police searched the offices of Square Enix, the publishers of Hi Score Girl, acting on an IP violation claim by SNK Playmore stating that the manga allegedly features over 100 instances of characters from The King of Fighters, Samurai Shodown, and other fighting games. In response, Square Enix voluntarily recalled all printed volumes and temporarily suspended publication of future volumes and digital sales. However, the manga continued its run in Monthly Big Gangan.

In August 2015, it was reported that Square Enix and SNK Playmore had reached a settlement, cancelling the lawsuit and enabling the manga to be sold again in different formats.

== See also ==
- Pupipō!, another manga series by Rensuke Oshikiri
- Semai Sekai no Identity, another manga series by Rensuke Oshikiri
- Geniearth, another manga series by Rensuke Oshikiri
