= Crayon Shin-chan: The Legend Called: Dance! Amigo! =

- Theatrical release poster
- Written by: Ryo Motohira
- Starring: Akiko Yajima; Miki Narahashi; Keiji Fujiwara; Satomi Kōrogi
- Production company: Shin-Ei Animation
- Distributed by: Toho
- Release date: April 15, 2006
- Running time: 92 minutes
- Country: Japan
- Language: Japanese

Crayon Shin-chan: The Legend Called: Dance! Amigo! (クレヨンしんちゃん 伝説を呼ぶ 踊れ!アミーゴ! Kureyon Shin Chan: Densetsu wo Yobu: Odore! Amīgo!), also known as Shin Chan Let's Dance Amigo!, is a 2006 anime film. It is the 14th film based on the popular comedy manga and anime series Crayon Shin-chan. The film took inspiration from the American film Body Double (1984). The film was released to theatres on April 15, 2006, in Japan.

The film was produced by Shin-Ei Animation, the studio behind the anime television.

== Plot ==
At a restaurant, the 3 teachers of Futaba Kindergarten discuss about the plans for the upcoming annual sports day event. Miss Matsuzaka suggests samba dance, which Miss Yoshinaga & Miss Ageo dismiss off. Late at night, when an inebriated Miss Yoshinaga was walking alone, she is ambushed by an entity lurking in the dark resembling her.

The next day, Shinchan is late as usual & cracks some very crude & crass off-color toilet jokes while indulging in mooning (like his usual self) towards Miss Yoshinaga but surprisingly she isn't put off from Shinchan's age-inappropriate antics, which surprises Misae. She even suggests to the Principal Takakura to include samba for the upcoming event, surprising Miss Matsuzaka.

At the school, Masao looks disturbed, saying that Ai has started to refer to him affectionately (which is unusual because she was besotted with Shinchan & whenever Masao tried to attract her attention, Ai would insult his attempts in plainsight). Masao is convinced that this Ai isn't real, but a body double. Bo then discusses about the urban legend of the doppelganger & tells the group about rumours circulating in Kasukabe city about people visiting a newly opened shopping mall being replaced by their doppelgangers. Initially the children dismiss this off, but Kazama observes that Miss Yoshinaga doesn't reacts at all to being pinched under her feet by a thumbtack that had fallen inside one of her shoes. At his house Kazama's mom is dancing to the tune of samba all alone by herself (which is very unusual for her). Kazama, unable to grasp the fact that his mother is not the real person, cries out loudly about it. Kazama's mom consoles him while her face gets twisted into a ghastly sight (which isn't noticed by him). In Shinchan's house, the family discusses about the same rumour while watching the live broadcast of a samba festival at Santa Monica.

The next day, the family visit the shopping mall in question. Hiroshi has a glance of his doppelganger, while Misae sees her doppelganger roaming around with a doppelganger Himawari. This doppelganger Misae tries to take away Shinchan by luring him with the promise of buying him chocolates, but an unknown beautiful woman (whom Shinchan had befriended at the mall after being besotted with her physical beauty) saves him & indulges in physical combat with her. She violently throws off the doppelganger Misae against the shelves, which causes her limbs to twist like soft tissue. This doppelganger Misae then flees the spot. Hidden inside the mall, a group of masked people in black capes dispose of the doppelganger/clone by making it explode like firecracker. Shinchan's family, who didn't witness the fight, were visibly troubled at the sight of their body doubles & quickly get out from there.

The next day, Misae insists that Hiroshi shouldn't go to the office on that day, but Hiroshi nevertheless goes. At school, Shinchan discusses all that he had witnessed at the mall with his friends. The children then discuss about the people around them not being their real selves. At this point, Principal Takakura calls out the children to begin practising for their sports event, but instead of playing their regular music cassette (which Shinchan's friends find out lying in the ground), he plays a psychedelic music & everyone present in the school (except Shinchan & his 4 friends, Miss Ageo & Miss Matsuzaka) start dancing in a frenzy in samba to its tunes. The children realise that all those who are dancing aren't the real persons, but their clones. They shout out to their real teachers to run away, but Miss Ageo is lured back by the clone of Ai's bodyguard Kuroiso (who is her love interest) & is overpowered by the clones of the children, whereas a clone of Miss Ageo vegetatively sprouts out of Kuroiso's clone. Principal Takakura's creepily dancing clone blocks their way, but Miss Matsuzaka fights him, thereby creating a distraction which allows the children to flee.

Hiroshi is travelling in the suburban rail returning back from his days' work, visibly disturbed, as he realised that his colleague Kawaguchi has been replaced by his clone, by the fact that he didn't react at all to a glass scale getting embedded within his head. He also realises that most people around him are also clones & is struck with fear. At Kasukabe station, the clone Kawaguchi intimidates Hiroshi & tries to capture him with his band of masked men wearing only black capes & underwear. Hiroshi manages to flee from their clutches & reaches home, but finds out that his clone has impersonated him & was bathing Shinchan. A fight ensures between the 2 of them, with Hiroshi neutralizing his clone with the help of the bad body odour emanating from his feet. The family dog Shiro, then reveals that the Shinchan present in the house isn't real, but also a clone. At this point, they are also surrounded by the masked men accompanying the clone Kawaguchi & the rejuvenated clone of Hiroshi. At this critical moment, they are saved by a car crashing into the house, & in it are the same woman from the shopping mall in the driver's seat & the real Shinchan. The woman driving the car introduces herself as Jackie.

The children are too scared to return to their own houses & instead take shelter at the local park until sunset, when they start feeling hungry. All of them decide to return home, with the condition that if they feel things aren't right, they would reassemble at the park. Kazama is overpowered by the clones of his mother & himself, whereas Nene, Masao & Bo successfully flee from the clones of their own mothers & reassemble at the park, worrying about Kazama & Shinchan. The clone Kazama finds out the 3 of them hiding in the park & leads another band of masked men in black capes to ambush them but are saved by the car carrying the Nohara family & Jackie.

Jackie states that she is a member of an international secret society called the SRI (Science Research Institute), investigating these clones, which first appeared in Santa Monica's samba festival. She also reveals that barring the passengers of the car, every citizen of Kasukabe have been replaced with these clones, which have been manufactured by a crazy Brazilian Japanese scientist, specialising in biotechnology called Amigo Suzuki, whose aim is to replace normal people with their clones, who will dance in psychedelic samba to their creator's will. She tries to get out of the city, but is thwarted by the clone citizens. At Bo's word, Jackie takes the local rugged mountainous terrain, but despite their many attempts, are finally caught by the clones. Jackie flees with Shiro, but the rest are caught & taken to their secret base, where all of them witness the entire process of how the clones of Nene, Masao & Bo were manufactured out of konnyaku jelly (a popular Japanese delicacy created out of the konjac yam plant).

Amigo Suzuki, the creator of this 'konjaclone' technology is revealed to be a masked woman dressed in black cape & lingerie, who is a big samba enthusiast & wants everybody to dance in psychedelic samba to her tunes for all eternity. Although the children are made to dance on her orders, the Noharas refuse to obey her. So when Amigo orders her henchmen to assault them into obedience, Jackie breaks into the facility with her armed men, with the help of Shiro, who sniffed out their location. Jackie's armed men from the SRI destroy the konjaclone manufacturing facility. Jackie then challenges Amigo into a dance competition, & hands the Noharas a formula that can melt & liquify the konjaclones. The Noharas & the children destroy Amigo's konjaclone henchmen & release the imprisoned populance of Kasukabe, who were being made to dance samba against their will without any respite.

Jackie isn't a match for Amigo's samba skills because she always feels herself to be inferior to Amigo in this matter, but Shinchan encourages Jackie to 'dance as she likes', & twerks while exposing his naked buttocks in her support. Seeing this, Jackie incorporates Shinchan's twerking into her samba moves, which the people find to be more attractive. The people of Kasukabe also begin to dance in Jackie's support, in order to drive the fact that people dance their best out of they own joy, & not on being forced to do so. Amigo loses the challenge & tries to flee but is caught. The mask falls off & Amigo appears to be a clone of Jackie, but this konjaclone exterior also melts down, revealing Amigo to be actually a man, who is actually Jackie's father. Jackie thanks Shinchan for providing her confidence to challenge her father's prodigious samba skills & gifts him her samba whistle. As the people get out from there, the sky is lit with a beautiful display of firecrackerers (usually seen in festive moments) caused by the konjaclones exploding into oblivion.
