= Sora tob sakana =

Japanese idol girl group

Sora Tob Sakana
- Origin: Japan
- Genres: Math rock; progressive rock; J-pop
- Years active: 2014–2020
- Labels: Theatre Academy; Flying Penguin Records; Fujiyama Project Japan; Warner Music Group; NBCUniversal Entertainment Japan
- Members: Natsuka Teraguchi; Fuka Kanzaki; Mana Yamazaki
- Past members: Yuiko Konishi; Mio Satō; Ray Malaika Kazama
- Website: soratobsakana.tokyo

Sora Tob Sakana was a Japanese alternative idol girl group formed in 2014. They released their debut single, "Yozora o Zenbu", on October 27, 2015.

== History ==
Sora tob sakana formed in July 2014 as the second act in the Frappe Idol Project after Siam & Poptune. They debuted in October 2015 with the single, "Yozora o Zenbu". Their second single, "Mahō no Kotoba", was released in February 2016. The group released their eponymous first studio album in July 2016. In April 2017, they released their first EP, Cocoon, followed by the group's first major label release: their second EP, Alight, in May 2018. Their third single, "New Stranger" was released in July 2018 and was featured in Hi Score Girl as the opening theme. They released their second studio album, World Fragment Tour, in March 2019. Their fourth single, "Sasayakana Shukusai", which was released in July 2019, was featured in Is It Wrong to Try to Pick Up Girls in a Dungeon? II as the ending theme. Their fifth single, "Flash", which was released in November 2019 was featured in Hi Score Girl II as the opening theme. On May 22, 2020, the group announced that they would disband on September 6. They released their third and final studio album, Deep blue, on August 5, 2020.

== Members ==
=== Final ===
- Natsuka Teraguchi (寺口夏花, Teraguchi Natsuka)
- Fuka Kanzaki (神﨑風花, Kanzaki Fuuka)
- Mana Yamazaki (山崎愛, Yamazaki Mana)

=== Former ===
- Yuiko Konishi (小西結子, Konishi Yuiko)
- Mio Satō (佐藤美緒, Satō Mio)
- Ray Malaika Kazama (風間玲マライカ, Kazama Rei Maraika)

== Discography ==
=== Studio albums ===
Title	Album details	Peak chart positions	
Title	Album details	JPN	
Title	Album details	Oricon	Hot
Sora tob sakana	Released: July 26, 2016; Label: Fujiyama Project Japan; Formats: CD, digital download	110	—
World Fragment Tour	Released: March 13, 2019; Label: Warner Music Group; Formats: CD, digital download	31	47
Deep blue	Released: August 5, 2020; Label: NBCUniversal Entertainment Japan; Formats: CD, digital download	20	34

=== Extended plays ===
Title	Album details	Peak chart positions	
Title	Album details	JPN	
Title	Album details	Oricon	Hot
Cocoon	Released: April 11, 2017; Label: Fujiyama Project Japan; Formats: CD, digital download	35	63
Alight	Released: May 16, 2018; Label: Warner Music Group; Formats: CD, digital download	29	41

=== Singles ===
Title	Year	Peak chart positions	Album
Title	Year	Oricon	Album
"Yozora o Zenbu" (夜空を全部)	2015	108	Sora tob sakana
"Mahō no Kotoba" (魔法の言葉)	2016	40	Sora tob sakana
"New Stranger"	2018	43	Deep blue
"Sasayakana Shukusai" (ささやかな祝祭)	2019	45	Non-album singles
"Flash"	2019	40	Non-album singles
