= Transformers: Armada =

Anime television series (2002-2003)

- Optimus Prime, his super mode and Mini-Con Sparkplug

超ロボット生命体トランスフォーマー マイクロン伝説 (Chō Robotto Seimeitai Toransufōmā Maikuron Densetsu)
- Genre: Adventure, mecha
- Created by: Yūjin Ishikawa; Steve Drucker
- Anime television series
- Directed by: Hidehito Ueda
- Written by: Ryo Motohira
- Music by: Hayato Matsuo
- Studio: Actas
- Licensed by: EU: Entertainment Rights (2002–2009); NA: Hasbro Hasbro Studios/Allspark (2014–2019) Entertainment One (2019–2023) Hasbro Entertainment (2023–present)
- Original network: TXN (TV Tokyo)
- English network: AU: Cartoon Network Network Ten; CA: YTV; IN: Cartoon Network; PH: Cartoon Network GMA Network Hero TV5; SA: Jetix; UK: Sky One, Sky One Mix; US: Cartoon Network (Toonami); ZA: M-Net (K-TV)
- Original run: August 23, 2002 – December 26, 2003
- Episodes: 52

Transformers: Armada, known in Japan as Super Robot Life-Form Transformers: Legends of the Microns (超ロボット生命体トランスフォーマー マイクロン伝説), is a Japanese anime series which debuted on August 23, 2002. As the first series co-produced between the American toy company Hasbro and their Japanese partner Takara, Armada begins a new continuity/universe for Transformers, with no ties to any of the previous series, including its direct predecessor Transformers: Robots in Disguise (known as Transformers: Car Robots in Japan) in 2001. It inspired two sequels, Transformers: Energon (2004) and Transformers: Cybertron (2005).

Hasbro handled the production of the English dub of the series, which was outsourced over to SD Entertainment. Hasbro themselves handled North American rights, with Entertainment Rights securing international rights, while Takara handled the distribution of the Japanese license. Transformers: Armada and both of its following series are all part of a saga known as the "Unicron Trilogy".

== Plot ==
On the planet of Cybertron, war rages between the two factions known as the Autobots and the Decepticons over the race of smaller, power-enhancing Transformers called Mini-Cons. Seeking to flee the conflict that surrounds them, the Mini-Cons escape Cybertron with the aid of the Autobots, but an attack by the Decepticons cripples the ship as it flees through a space bridge. The ship materializes in the Solar System and impacts with the Moon, breaking in two. One portion of the ship stays embedded on the Moon, while the other plummets to the planet below. The Mini-Cons, all locked in pentagonal stasis panels, are scattered across the globe. The ship crashes to Earth and 4 million years pass.

When two boys Bradley "Rad" White and Carlos Lopez investigate the caves outside their hometown, one of the small towns in an area known as the "High Desert" they accidentally uncover the wreckage of the Mini-Con ship and activate it, causing it to send a signal that alerts both the Autobots and Decepticons as to the Mini-Cons' presence on Earth. Megatron and Optimus Prime's forces teleport to Earth from Cybertron as a result. Rad, Carlos, and their friend Alexis Thi Dang befriend the Autobots, along with the Mini-Cons High Wire, Grindor, and Sureshock (known commonly as the Street Action Mini-Con Team in the toyline). The Transformers assume earth vehicle alternate modes and the hunt begins to locate the scattered Mini-Cons.

After a series of battles, each of the Transformers successfully acquires a partner Mini-Con. Smokescreen arrives to join the Autobots' team. Hologram recordings in a sunken city reveal the existence of the mighty Mini-Con weapon, the Star Saber sword. The Decepticons possess one component of the weapon and invade the Autobot base to steal the remaining two pieces, only for the Autobots to seize possession of the sword.

A mysterious mercenary named Scavenger arrives on Earth and sides with the Decepticons, urging them to locate the components of the Skyboom Shield, another Mini-Con weapon that can counter the power of the Star Saber. At the same time, an Autobot drifter named Sideways enters the fray but soon reveals his allegiance to the Decepticons after he betrays Hot Shot, allowing the Star Saber to fall into the Decepticons' hands.

Concurrently Scavenger reveals himself to be an undercover Autobot, and rejoins his fellows, soon followed by Blurr, the latest arrival from Cybertron. When the Decepticons complete the Skyboom Shield, a mighty battle ensues that ends with the Autobots gaining possession of the shield. The two weapons unleash a powerful energy flare, drawing the Decepticons, Thrust, a master tactician, and Tidal Wave, a large and powerful warrior, to Earth.

Meanwhile, Sideways surreptitiously stirs trouble in the Decepticon camp by playing on their contradictions. While luring the Autobots' human allies into cyberspace in an attempt to capture their Mini-Cons, Sideways reveals that he serves a mysterious higher power. Thrust arrives and puts his tactical prowess into play, only for his schemes to be foiled by the arrival of the second-in-command Autobot, Jetfire, whose power to combine with Optimus defeats Thrust's schemes.

Eventually, Sideways' deception is discovered and Megatron destroys him with the Star Saber, only for Sideways to escape by reforming his body. Tidal Wave arrives on Earth, and the Autobots prove vastly outmatched. Rad, Carlos, and Alexis are alerted to the existence of the Requiem Blaster, the third Mini-Con weapon by Sideways, and locate Skyblast, one of its components. Skyblast sings an eerie harmony that summons the other two Mini-Cons from their stasis, and they form the Blaster, allowing Optimus to defeat Tidal Wave.

Both sides soon gain new members in Sideswipe, an eager new Autobot, and Wheeljack, a former Autobot who has joined the Decepticons, believing that Hot Shot betrayed him on Cybertron. Thrust formulates a new scheme that allows the Decepticons to steal the Requiem Blaster, which involves mortally wounding Smokescreen in the process, causing Red Alert to re-format him into the more powerful form of Hoist. Starscream is his patsy, leading the already-alienated Decepticon to turn on Megatron and side with the Autobots. Starscream forms a friendship with the kids, particularly Alexis, and allows the Autobots access to the Decepticons' base.

A raid allows the Autobots to free the Mini-Cons. Still, Starscream discreetly catches Thrust scheming with Sideways and makes a tough choice to steal the Skyboom Shield and Star Saber and rejoin the Decepticons as a double agent. With all three Mini-Con weapons now in their possession, the Decepticons create the Hydra Cannon, a weapon that combines all their power and plans to destroy Earth from orbit. Optimus uses his Matrix to absorb the blast but sacrifices himself in the process.

The Decepticons head for Cybertron in their craft, and the Autobots, now with Hot Shot in command, hastily construct a craft named the Axalon to pursue them. The Mini-Cons, now unleashing their true powers, accompany them into space, immediately leading into a battle that sees them use their full power to resurrect Optimus.

A black hole transports a small number of Autobots and Decepticons to a barren world where they are ravaged by Nemesis Prime, a twisted clone of Optimus, and have their power and armor enhanced by the Mini-Cons and with Megatron renaming himself Galvatron. Subsequently, the Decepticons return to Cybertron and quickly overthrow most of the planet through the powers of the Mini-Con weapons. Hot Shot assaults the Decepticon base solo, resulting in the revelation of Thrust's treachery. Thrust escapes with the Skyboom Shield and Requiem Blaster, delivering them to Sideways, who uses them to awaken the great and terrible Unicron, an underlying enemy whose coming the Mini-Cons had foretold.

Rad and his friends are sent drifting through time, where it is revealed that via this, they played a part in the development of the Mini-Cons revealed to be the cells of Unicron. Rad convinces High Wire which eventually leads the Mini-Cons to leave Cybertron setting the whole events. Galvatron refuses to believe in the threat of Unicron and Starscream forces him into a duel—a duel Starscream purposefully loses, sacrificing himself to prove to Galvatron the threat of Unicron exists. Sideways steals the Star Saber, fully awakening Unicron, as the Autobots and Decepticons unite into one armada to attack the colossal Transformer who had been disguised as Cybertron's moon. During the battle, Galvatron confronts Thrust over his betrayal and leaves him to perish after the latter inadvertently gets himself crushed in Unicron's shoulder.

While Unicron attacks Cybertron, Galvatron, and Optimus enter Unicron's body, where Sideways reveals himself to be created by Unicron as an emissary to bring the Mini-Cons back under his master's control only to have Rad re-awaken their minds, allowing the Mini-Con weapons to free themselves, de-powering Unicron. With Sideways eliminated and the threat of Unicron apparently gone, Galvatron challenges Optimus to a final battle, only for the energy released from their conflict to reactivate Unicron. Upon realizing his mistake in continuing their hatred, Galvatron decides to sacrifice himself to end the cycle of hatred that allows Unicron to exist. With Galvatron's death, Unicron mysteriously disappears, and peace returns to Cybertron. Despite justice being given to all Transformers, Optimus feels dishonored, stating that he does not deserve the Matrix anymore, and goes into exile. The Autobots then send the kids back to Earth.

== Characters ==
=== Autobots ===
- Optimus Prime (voiced by Garry Chalk) (The Japanese version is called Convoy.fans refer to him as Armada Convoy to distinguish him from other Convoys.) is the leader of the Autobots. He transforms into a semi-truck and is partnered with the Mini-Con Sparkplug. Prime's trailer can transform into a battle station operable by Prime and several Mini-Cons. Prime can also combine with his base to form a "Super Mode" robot. Additionally, Prime can combine with Jetfire and/or Overload for additional power - Jet Optimus. His Matrix can restore him even when his spark is vaporized.
- Jetfire (voiced by Scott McNeil) is the second-in-command of the Autobots on Cybertron, Jetfire departed Cybertron around the same time as the Decepticon Thrust, arriving on Earth just in time to thwart Thrust's plan. Jetfire transforms into a space shuttle, and is partnered with the Mini-Con Comettor. As a fighter, Jetfire is very powerful and capable. However, he is a very boastful individual, constantly reminding the other Autobots of his greatness and his rank.
- Hot Shot (voiced by Brent Miller) (Hot Rod) is an impetuous Autobot whose hot-headedness often gets him into situations he cannot handle. However, Optimus Prime sees potential in him and sculpts him to be a leader. Hot Shot transforms into a sports car, and is partnered with the Mini-Con Jolt.
- Red Alert (voiced by Brian Dobson) (Ratchet)is the Autobots' medical expert, who transforms into an ambulance and is partnered with the Mini-Con Longarm. Red Alert enters combat less frequently than the other Autobots, usually staying to guard the base, but his talents are no less appreciated, particularly by individuals like Smokescreen, whose life he saved.
- Smokescreen (voiced by Dale Wilson) (Grapp) is Hot Shot's best friend. Originally intended to be one of the team members who accompanied Optimus Prime to Earth first, Smokescreen entered the spacebridge portal late, and the resultant distortion caused him to materialize some time later. After a brief case of mistaken identity which saw the kids flee from him, he reunited with the Autobots. After being destroyed by the Decepticons, Smokescreen is rebuilt as Hoist(The Japanese toy is called Grapp S (Super Mode)). Smokescreen transforms into a crane. As Hoist, he becomes a steam shovel. He is partnered with the Mini-Con Liftor. When Smokescreen became Hoist, he gained Refute as a Mini-Con partner.
- Scavenger (voiced by Ward Perry) (Devastor) is an old war veteran who holds the distinction of being the Autobot who taught Optimus Prime the ways of battle. After arriving on Earth, Scavenger poses as a mercenary and joins the Decepticons for a time to uncover information. Scavenger transforms into a bulldozer and is teamed with the Mini-Con Rollbar.
- Blurr (voiced by Brian Drummond) (Silver Bolt) is one of the later additions to the Autobot team, partnered with the Mini-Con Incinerator, who can convert his sports car alternate mode into a flying form. Blurr is close friends with Hot Shot.
- Sideswipe (voiced by Sam Vincent) (Stepper) was assigned as Hot Shot's partner, charging him with keeping a watchful eye over him. Sideswipe transforms into a sports car, and is partnered with the Mini-Con Nightbeat, who can convert his vehicle form into a high-speed pursuit mode.
- Overload (Ultra Magnus) is a weapons platform crafted by the Mini-Cons at the same time as they recreated Optimus Prime's body. He can convert from vehicle mode into a set of cannons and combine with Optimus Prime for added firepower. Overload is partnered with the Mini-Con Rollout.

=== Decepticons ===
- Megatron (voiced by David Kaye) is the leader of the Decepticons. He can transform into an H-shaped Cybertronian tank. Although usually stern and unflappable on the outside, there are many conflicting emotions with Megatron - he has dedicated his life to war, to the extent that he knows nothing else, and the suggestion that his days of fighting could be over causes him much dismay. The death of Optimus Prime plunged Megatron into a deep depression, relieved only after Prime's resurrection. Megatron was among the Transformers who had their powers boosted by their Mini-Con, becoming Galvatron (Megatron S (Super Mode)). After Unicron is reawakened, Megatron sacrifices himself to destroy him.
- Starscream (voiced by Michael Dobson) is the youngest member of Megatron's group who can transform into a Cybertronian jet fighter. Unlike most depictions of the character, Starscream suffers from an inferiority complex and seeks to gain the approval and respect of his commander, Megatron. Forcibly made the last of the Decepticons to gain his partner Mini-Con, Swindle, Starscream is manipulated by Sideways into a duel with Megatron, which he loses. A short time later, Starscream (given ownership of the Star Saber) was made the patsy in Thrust's plan to steal the Requiem Blaster from the Autobots, which led to him being abandoned on the battlefield. Surviving to return to the Decepticon base, Starscream disowns the Decepticons and sides with the Autobots for a time. He would later gain a new color scheme where he commented that he looked like Thundercracker. To show Galvatron the error of his ways, Starscream challenges him to a duel, then attacks Unicron, who kills him. Starscream's death prompts Megatron and Optimus to form an alliance to defeat Unicron.
- Demolishor (voiced by Alvin Sanders) (Ironhide) is Megatron's second-in-command on Earth who can transform into an anti-aircraft missile tank. He is extremely strong but has rather too little wits. He always acts in the strict conformity with the principle "big strength is much more better than big brains". He is very serious and rather morose by nature. Demolishor is partnered with the Mini-Con Blackout.
- Cyclonus (voiced by Don Brown) (Sandstorm) is a Decepticon with a "trigger happy" personality, cackling as he fires his weaponry even when he transforms into an assault helicopter. However, he is also lazy as he constantly slacks off when he stays where he often sleeps during guard duty, much to the annoyance of the other Decepticons. He is partnered with the Mini-Con Crumplezone, who can convert to a cockpit extension that gives him extra firepower.
- Thrust (voiced by Colin Murdock) is a tactician who is able to transform into a jet and become invisible. He personally selected the Mini-Con Inferno to his partner when he arrived on Earth from Cybertron. Following being disrespected for these setbacks and an intriguing encounter with Sideways with the promise of great power and respect, Thrust began to work against Megatron, while at the same time arranging a scheme that saw him manipulate Starscream and eventually allowed the Decepticons to gain possession of all three Mini-Con weapons, which Thrust assembled into the Hydra Cannon. After his deception is revealed, Thrust is killed upon getting caught in Unicron's transformation as Megatron advised him to go out like that or be hunted by him.
- Tidal Wave (voiced by Doug Parker) (Shockwave) is the largest of the Decepticons, arriving on Earth shortly after Thrust, and proved himself very powerful. Tidal Wave transforms into a huge warship, which can in turn separate into three smaller vehicles (hovercraft, submarine and aircraft carrier), collectively called the "Dark Fleet". His Mini-Con partner is Thrasher.
- Wheeljack (voiced by Michael Daingerfield) (Rampage) is a former Autobot who served in the same company as Hot Shot on Cybertron. When they were both caught in a conflagration on the battle field, Hot Shot was forced to leave him to get help, but was prevented from returning to his friend's side by his commander. Wheeljack was found and rescued by Megatron who he subsequently swore loyalty to. Wheeljack transforms into a sports car, and possesses the power of teleportation. Additionally, he can create illusionary duplicates of himself. His Mini-Con partner is Wind Sheer.

=== Mini-Cons ===
- Serving as representatives of their kind, the Street Action Team consists of High Wire (Wheelie), Grindor (Bank), and Sureshock (Arcee). Together, they can combine into Perceptor (Bumble). High Wire was the first of the Mini-Cons on Earth to awaken, and immediately imprinted on Rad, assuming the alternate form of a dirtbike based on Rad's own vehicle. Grindor and Sureshock soon did the same with Carlos's skateboard and Alexis' scooter, respectively. It is later revealed that the Street Action Team had been brought to life by the children themselves after they were sent back in time.
- Bonecrusher, Knock Out, and Wreckage are Mini-Cons modeled after military vehicles. Bonecrusher can transform into a missile truck, Knock Out can transform into a six-wheeled armoured personnel carrier, and Wreckage can transform into a tank with twin missiles launchers.
- Buzzsaw, Drill Bit, and Dualor are Mini-Cons that are made for destruction. Buzzsaw can transform into a bucket-wheel excavation machine, Drill Bit can transform into a treaded tunneling machine, and Dualor can transform into an anti-aircraft tank.
- Gunbarrel, Thunderwing, and Terradive were used by Galvatron a lot because of the sheer power. Gunbarrell can transform into a cargo jet, Thunderwing can transform into a stealth bomber, and Terradive can transform into a recon jet. Each have three modes: robot, jet, and weapon mode.
- Jetstorm, Runway, and Sonar are three Mini-Cons who combine to form the Star Saber Sword, whose energized blade can cut through almost anything. Jetstorm can transform into a concorde jet, can transform into a supersonic bomber, and Sonar can transform into a space shuttle. The three are later used as the power source of the Hydra Cannon and as keys to awaken Unicron.
- Downshift, Dirt Boss, and Mirage are three Mini-Cons who merge into the Skyboom Shield. Downshift can transform into a Le Mans racer, Dirt Boss can transform into a rally SUV, and Mirage can transform into an Indy racer. The three are later used as the power source of the Hydra Cannon and as keys to awaken Unicron.
- Skyblast, Astroscope, and Payload are three Mini-Cons that join to create the Requiem Blaster. Skyblast can transform into a rocket, Astroscope can transform into a space station, and Payload can transform into a rocket transporter. The three are later used as the power source of the Hydra Cannon and as keys to awaken Unicron.
- Oceanglide, Stormcloud, and Waterlog are three ocean-based Mini-Cons that work with Tidal Wave. Oceanglide can transform into a "solar sail" boat with rear turbines, Stormcloud can transform into a speedboat, and Waterlog can transform into a hovercraft.
- Prowl, Makeshift, and Firebot are three Mini-cons designed for search and rescue. Prowl can transform into a police cruiser, Makeshift can transform into a VTOL plane, and Firebot can transform into a fire engine.

==== Mini-Con partners of the Autobots ====
- Sparkplug is Optimus Prime's Mini-Con partner. After Optimus's death, Sparkplug was found clutching the Matrix, and later, would lead the charge when the Mini-Cons used it to resurrect Optimus.
- Comettor is Jetfire's Mini-Con partner. He can transform into a six-wheeled Cybertronian moon buggy with a top-mounted blaster.
- Jolt is a Mini-Con who can transform into a red helicopter. he is partnered with Hot Shot and is strong enough in vehicle mode to lift and fly with Hot Shot. He can fold down his rear half as a helicopter to become a propeller for Hot Shot which enables him to travel short distances in air, achieve high speeds on land and even travel underwater.
- Longarm is Red Alert's Mini-Con partner. He can transform into a hook-crane truck of undetermined model.
- Liftor is Smokescreen's Mini-Con partner. He can transform into an unnamed heavy lifting vehicle.
- Refute is Hoist's Mini-Con partner. He can transform into a Cybertronian vehicle that has large gripper arms in the front.
- Rollbar is Scavenger's Mini-Con partner. He can transform into a beach buggy of indeterminate model.
- Incinerator is a Mini-Con who can transform into a long-nosed drag racer. Partnered with Blurr, he activates two missile launchers/guns and is very powerful, he also activates a flight mode for Blurr.
- Nightbeat is Sideswipe's Mini-Con partner. He can transform into a motorcycle of indeterminate model.
- Rollout is Overload's Mini-Con partner that incorporates upgraded Headmaster technology. He can transform into an armoured personnel carrier that can tow Overload's body.

==== Mini-Con partners of the Decepticons ====
- Leader-1 is Megatron's personal Mini-Con, who served him even back on Cybertron. He can transform into a Cybertronian buggy with twin top-mounted blasters. For the most part, Leader-1 is Megatron's devoted servant, but he suffered a brief period of doubt when shown friendship by Billy and Fred. He would later up-grade Megatron into Galvatron after he was salvaged by Nemesis Prime.
- Swindle is Starscream's Mini-Con partner who he personally fought to claim in the episode "Jungle". He can transform into an Indy-style race car. Swindle would later be seen at the scene of Starscream's death when he lamented Starscream's death and was comforted by Optimus Prime.
- Blackout is Demolishor's Mini-Con partner. He can transform into a six-wheeled APC/anti-aircraft vehicle.
- Crumplezone is Cyclonus' Mini-Con partner. He can transform into a tank.
- Inferno is Thrust's Mini-Con partner. He can transform into a missile truck.
- Ramjet is Tidal Wave's Mini-Con partner. He can transform into a Dassault Rafale fighter jet.
- Wind Sheer is Wheeljack's Mini-Con partner. He can transform into a F-117A Nighthawk-resembling stealth fighter.

=== Other Cybertronians ===
- Laserbeak (Cyberhawk) is a small transforming drone gifted to Rad, Carlos and Alexis by Red Alert, Laserbeak transforms into a robotic bird, a video camera, and a stun gun. It is usually used by the kids to beam images from battles back to headquarters.
- Sideways (voiced by Paul Dobson) (Double-face) is able to transform into a motorcycle. His consciousness is apparently housed within the smaller robot who rides his alternate mode, which can split into two Mini-Con components Rook and Crosswise. Posing as a drifter, Sideways surreptitiously manipulates and sabotages battles, creating dissent in the Decepticon ranks, ensuring that the balance of power between the Autobots and Decepticons is perpetually shifting. After Unicron is deactivated, Sideways attacks the Autobots, but is killed by Optimus Prime.
  - Rook (Bright) and Crosswise (Shadow) are two Mini-Cons. They can transform into two different head modules: Crosswise is the Decepticon head module and Rook is the Autobot head module. Rook and Crosswise can also combine (The Japanese version's name when combined is Mirror) into one form where they can ride on Sideways. They were destroyed alongside Sideways.
- Unicron (voiced by Mark Acheson) is a primal force of evil representing darkness and hate who can transform into a planet. Unicron was defeated by the Autobot warrior Omega Supreme in the distant past and subsequent disguised himself as the moon of Cybertron. In order to re-energize himself, Unicron created the Mini-Cons, intending to use them for his own benefit in the Autobot/Decepticon war. In the present day, Unicron is restored to life, but Megatron sacrifices himself to destroy him.
  - Dead End is Unicron's Mini-Con partner who can transform into a mechanical Moon. He and his similar drones work to defend Unicron.
- Nemesis Prime (voiced by Paul Dobson) (Scourge) is a Cybertronian who the Autobots and Decepticons encounter after being sucked into a worm hole and appeared on a strange planet. He is destroyed by Optimus Prime, leaving an image of Sideways behind.

=== Humans ===
Bradley "Rad" White (voiced by Kirby Morrow) and Carlos Lopez (voiced by Matt Hill) are best friends who reactivated the Mini-Con ship while exploring the caves outside their city. Soon joined by their friend Alexis Thi Dang (voiced by Tabitha St. Germain) (Alexa), they befriended the Street Action Team Mini-Cons as Megatron and Optimus Prime's forces arrived on Earth. This led to their alliance with Optimus and the Autobots, as they frequently helped them on missions, teaching them the ways of Earth. Unfortunately, they were unable to keep their friendship with the Autobots a secret from the local bullies, Billy (voiced by Andrew Francis) and Fred (voiced by Tony Sampson) (Gym), but the two boys quickly softened and became friends with the trio, as they too became Autobot allies.

== Production and release ==
=== Development ===
Transformers: Armada was written and produced in Japan, with creative input from America. However, the show premiered on Cartoon Network's Toonami block in the United States before its original Japanese counterpart had aired—the result of a demanding production schedule set by the network, which caused the series to be fast-tracked out of production. Consequently, Armada features a lot of unfinished animation (which would go on to be perfected for the completed Japanese episodes), and a hastily produced dub which features many errors in naming such as Sureshock being repeatedly called "Grindor" in multiple episodes, Hot Shot being called "Hot Rod", and Optimus's Mini-Con partner Sparkplug being called "Leader-1" (the same name as Megatron's Mini-Con), as well as transliteration and nonsensical dialogue which does not match the action onscreen.

Veteran Transformers voice actors Garry Chalk and David Kaye appear in the English dub of series as Optimus Prime and Megatron respectively. Chalk previously voiced the equivalent character Optimus Primal in Beast Wars: Transformers and Beast Machines: Transformers, while Kaye voiced a different version of Megatron in the same shows.

When Armada was released on DVD in Japan, each of the thirteen volumes came with a four-page mini-manga and an exclusive repainted Mini-Con figure. The manga, titled Tales of the Microns: Linkage, feature these repaints in an original story which served to fill in many of the blank spots and plot holes in the animated series.

=== Airing ===
Despite Transformers: Armada being made by a Japanese studio, it premiered first in the United States. The series premiered on Cartoon Network (via the network's Toonami block) on August 23, 2002, at 4 P.M. with a 90-minute movie special, consisting of the first three episodes titled "First Encounter", "Metamorphosis" and "Base". Following its premiere, new episodes started coming out on August 30, airing every Friday at 6:30 P.M. On November 4, 2002, the series also began airing from Monday to Thursday until March 14, 2003. During this time, the series also moved to the network's Saturday Video Entertainment System programming block from March 1, 2003 to May 10, 2003, and in the early mornings from March 17, 2003, to June 27, 2003. The series returned to Toonami for a second run beginning on September 1, 2003, airing exclusively on Fridays until September 29, 2003, when it also returned to the Monday-Thursday lineup. The series then stayed in the lineup until January 2, 2004. The series also appeared on Toonami's Super Saturday lineup from September 21, 2002, to February 22, 2003, the final airing of the block before its cancellation.

In the December issue of Japanese magazine Animage, it was announced that the anime would start airing in Japan on January 10, 2003, on TV Tokyo, with new episodes coming out every Friday at 6 P.M.

In Canada, the series premiered on Corus Entertainment's YTV on December 18, 2002. In Spain, Armada aired on Cartoon Network from 2003 to 2004. The series also aired on Cartoon Network in Australia in 2004. In India, the series also aired on Cartoon Network from May 12, 2004, to 2005.

In the Philippines, the series premiered on GMA Network on March 12, 2005, with a Filipino dub.

The series is also available for streaming online on Tubi, Pluto TV, Amazon Prime Video and The Roku Channel, as well as the Transformers YouTube channel (the first 15 episodes only).

=== Home media ===
Entertainment Rights owned worldwide home video rights to the series.

==== North America ====
In 2003, Entertainment Rights signed a North American home video deal with Rhino Entertainment Company to release the series on DVD in North America. These sets are now discontinued and out-of-print.

In August 2013, it was announced that Shout! Factory had partnered with Hasbro Studios to release numerous Transformers series on DVD in the United States, including Transformers: Armada. Shout! Factory would then subsequently released Transformers: Armada: The Complete Series on DVD in Region 1 on March 11, 2014.

==== International ====
In the United Kingdom, Right Entertainment and Universal Pictures Video released several VHS and DVD volumes of the series.

In Australia, Madman Entertainment released both volumes of Transformers: Armada on DVD in Region 4 in 2013 and 2014, respectively.

== Related media ==
=== Video game ===
Developed by Atari Melbourne House and released for PlayStation 2 by Atari on May 11, 2004, in North America and May 7, 2004, in Europe, the Transformers video game (originally called Transformers Armada: Prelude to Energon, but simply titled again as Transformers.) is loosely based on the Armada series. The player controls three Autobots: Optimus Prime, Hot Shot, and Red Alert. The general story is the same as the TV show: the player must find and collect the Mini-Cons and fight off Megatron and his Decepticons. The player travels through various large environments on Earth (such as the Amazon Jungle and Antarctica) while fighting off Megatron's "Decepticlone" army and finding Mini-Cons that give the player's character different abilities in order to get further into the game. The player will also fight a number of familiar Decepticons from the Armada show, such as Starscream, Cyclonus, and Tidal Wave. The plot is similar to Armada, right down to the final battle with Unicron at the end. A few of the voice actors from the show (notably Garry Chalk as Prime and David Kaye as Megatron) voiced for the game. There are also subtle references to The Transformers: The Movie. The game is rated T on the ESRB ratings scale.

=== Comics ===
From 2002 to 2003, Canada-based Dreamwave Productions published a Transformers: Armada comic book, that ran for 18 issues.

=== Merchandise ===
Built to Rule was a building blocks toyline from Hasbro that is compatible with such leading brands as Lego. Each Transformers kit is centered around a "Trans-Skeleton", a very simple humanoid body that folds up for vehicle mode without dis-assembly. From there, extra parts are added to the Trans-Skeleton for either mode. For Armada, the Trans-Skeleton was a very broad, flat solid plate with thin, stick-like limbs attached to it, which led to very awkward-looking robot modes.

== Broadcasting ==
Country	Channel
Japan	TXN (TV Tokyo, TVO, TVA, TVH, TVQ, TSC, BS-TV Tokyo)
United States	Cartoon Network, Kabillion
Canada	YTV
United Kingdom	Sky One, Sky One Mix
South Korea	SBS Seoul
Germany	RTL II
Mexico	Fox Kids/Jetix
Peru	Fox Kids/Jetix
Colombia	Fox Kids/Jetix
Venezuela	Fox Kids/Jetix
Ecuador	Fox Kids/Jetix
Chile	Fox Kids/Jetix
Argentina	Fox Kids/Jetix
Bolivia	Fox Kids/Jetix
Paraguay	Fox Kids/Jetix
Guatemala	Fox Kids/Jetix
Costa Rica	Fox Kids/Jetix
El Salvador	Fox Kids/Jetix
Mexico	Canal de las Estrellas, Jetix
Netherlands	Fox Kids, Jetix
Belgium	VT4, Fox Kids, Jetix
Portugal	TVI, Canal Panda, Panda Biggs
Serbia	Ultra
Malaysia	TV3, Cartoon Network (Southeast Asia), TV2 (Malay dubbed)
Bulgaria	bTV, Jetix, Nova Television
Slovenia	POP TV
Brazil	Fox Kids, Rede Globo
Poland	Polsat, TV4
Philippines	Cartoon Network, GMA 7, Hero TV, TV5
Australia	Cartoon Network, Network Ten (On Toasted TV)
Israel	Jetix
Arab World Countries	MBC 3
France	Gulli
India	Cartoon Network, Discovery Kids
Italy	Fox Kids Italy, Jetix Italy, Super 3, NuovaRete
Romania	Pro TV
South Africa	SABC 2
Spain	Cartoon Network
