= SD Gundam G Generation =

Video game series

SD Gundam G Generation (Note: Japanese: エスディーガンダム ジージェネレーション, Hepburn: Esudī Gandamu Jī Jenerēshon) is a series of strategy-RPG video games that focus on the Gundam anime franchise.

== History ==
Release timeline Physical releases in bold
1998	**SD Gundam G Generation**
1999	**SD Gundam G Generation Zero**
2000	**SD Gundam G Generation-F**
2000	**SD Gundam G Generation GATHER BEAT**
2001	**SD Gundam G Generation-F IF**
2001	**SD Gundam G Generation GATHER BEAT 2**
2002	**SD Gundam G Generation MONOEYE GUNDAMS**
2002	**SD Gundam G Generation DA**
2002	**SD Gundam G Generation NEO**
2003	SD Gundam G Generation-i
2003	**SD Gundam G Generation Advance**
2004	**SD Gundam G Generation SEED**
2004	SD Gundam G Generation-V
2005	SD Gundam G Generation-ii
2005	**SD Gundam G Generation DS**
2005	**Mobile Suit Gundam SEED Destiny: Generation of C.E**
2006	**SD Gundam G Generation Portable**
2007	SD Gundam G Generation-iii
2007	**SD Gundam G Generation Cross Drive**
2007	**SD Gundam G Generation Spirits**
2008
2009	**SD Gundam G Generation Wars**
2009	SD Gundam G Generation Mobile
2010	SD Gundam G Generation Mobile Next Universe
2010	SD Gundam G Generation Touch
2011	**SD Gundam G Generation World**
2011	**SD Gundam G Generation 3D**
2012	**SD Gundam G Generation Overworld**
2013	SD Gundam G Generation Frontier
2014
2015
2016	**SD Gundam G Generation Genesis**
2017	SD Gundam G Generation RE
2018
2019	**SD Gundam G Generation Cross Rays**
2020
2021
2022
2023
2024
2025	SD Gundam G Generation Eternal

The G Generation series is a follow-up series to six games released by Bandai for their Nintendo Super Famicom Sufami Turbo add-on. A Generation focused on the One Year War, B Generation focused on the Gryps Conflict, and so forth up to F Generation, which covered the plot of G Gundam. Instead of making a G Generation game themed about Gundam Wing, Bandai optioned the title for its new series of games, using the same gameplay. Since "G" was often used as an abbreviation for "Gundam", it was decided that G Generation would represent the series as a whole. When it was finally released in 1998 for the PlayStation, G Generation covered the plot for Mobile Suit Gundam through Char's Counterattack and featured characters from the remaining Universal Century series, as well as G Gundam, Gundam Wing and Gundam X. Starting with PORTABLE, released on August 3, 2006, the series was released by Bandai Namco Games (now Bandai Namco Entertainment), which inherited Bandai's computer game business. While the Mobile Suit Gundam: Gihren's Ambition series, which is also a war simulation game based on the Gundam series, is a realism-oriented strategy simulation game that deals with the entire war, this series, while using SD Gundam as a medium, is different from the traditional comical route and is a tactical simulation game that recreates individual battles in the Gundam series. The controls are relatively easy, so even beginners to simulation games can enjoy it. Another feature is that each work features an original unit.

== Series features ==
The series typically has two kinds of plots: some games faithfully adapt the plot of a series that game is based on, while others feature an original, crossover storyline, focusing on the new relationships between characters of different series. In addition to the familiar cast of Gundam characters, G Generation games often feature brand-new characters. Most of the time, the original characters have no plot impact on the game. However, the game Monoeye Gundams features a new group of characters with their own storyline, supported by the events of the One Year War and the Gryps Conflict.

Most of the G Generation games feature brand-new mobile suits and armors designed exclusively for the game. All of the machines are given a backstory that ties them into the canon Gundam storyline, with most being incomplete or rejected prototypes. A vast majority of the original machines represent the Universal Century, but every universe except Cosmic Era has received at least one original machine.

Unlike the popular Super Robot Wars series, G Generation does not limit characters to only piloting machines from their own universe. For example, Amuro Ray could pilot XXXG-00W0 Wing Gundam Zero. However, some restrictions still exist, and some machines can only be piloted by characters who belong to certain categories. Other restrictions are plot-based.

Like Super Robot Wars, G Generation lets the player recruit certain enemy characters. Most of the time, you are able to save sympathetic characters who were on the losing side of the conflict, such as Gundam 0080's Bernard Wiseman and Zeta Gundam's Four Murasame. Other times, the player can convince characters who would never join the heroes.

Most G Generation games allow capturing enemy machines, adding them to their own roster. Some games allow the player to capture enemy machines after their Mothership is destroyed, while some handheld games allow capture of damaged machines if they are surrounded by three or more player units.

Featured only in the handheld G Generation games, ID Commands act in a similar fashion to spells in traditional role-playing games, but are based around a character's memorable lines from the Gundam series.

Usually linked to ID Commands, the handheld G Generation games often feature Hyper Modes for characters from all series. Earned through unique circumstances and activated by special ID Commands, Hyper Modes typically represent the peak of a character's power while piloting the mobile suit their most famous mobile suit. Universal Century characters' Hyper Modes are typically a representation of their Newtype power reaching its peak, while the Alternate Universe series characters' Hyper Modes are usually linked to their Gundams' special systems. In console, and some PSP G Generation games like G Generation Overworld, a few units, like Gundam F91, will activate Hyper Mode when pilot has max morale, while pocket games, such as G Generation DS, will let a pilot activate the Mobile Suit's Hyper Mode when a certain SP is reached.

These games also feature Databases, containing information about every character featured in that game.

== Physical releases ==
Game	Details
SD Gundam G Generation Original release date: JP: 1998/08/06	Release years by system: 1998 – PlayStation
SD Gundam G Generation Original release date: JP: 1998/08/06	Notes: Focuses on all events leading up to Char's Counterattack. This game also has a Premium Disk version.
SD Gundam G Generation Zero Original release date: JP: 1999/08/12	Release years by system: 1999 – PlayStation
SD Gundam G Generation Zero Original release date: JP: 1999/08/12	Notes: This release focuses on everything in the Universal Century Timeline. It also includes a bonus Scenario for G Gundam, Gundam Wing, and Gundam X.
SD Gundam G Generation-F Original release date: JP: 2000/07/13	Release years by system: 2000 – PlayStation
SD Gundam G Generation-F Original release date: JP: 2000/07/13	Notes: Covers events of all Gundam anime through Gundam X as well as many manga and video game spinoffs such as Gundam Sentinel, Crossbone Gundam, and G-Unit/Last Outpost. Includes bonus scenarios for Turn A Gundam. The 2006 PSP game, Portable, is effectively an enhanced remake.
SD Gundam G Generation GATHER BEAT Original release date: JP: 2000	Release years by system: 2000 – WonderSwan
SD Gundam G Generation GATHER BEAT Original release date: JP: 2000	Notes: The first G Generation game to feature a crossover plot. Also the first G Generation to use the three-man squad setup that would become standard for the handheld games. In 2003 an expanded remake, Advance, for the GBA was released.
SD Gundam G Generation-F IF Original release date: JP: 2001/05/02	Release years by system: 2001 – PlayStation
SD Gundam G Generation-F IF Original release date: JP: 2001/05/02	Notes: Expansion disc for G Generation-F. It includes difficult bonus missions, a complete unit encyclopedia, and the ability to freely alter the player's original characters.
SD Gundam G Generation GATHER BEAT 2 Original release date: JP: 2001/06/14	Release years by system: 2001 – WonderSwan Color
SD Gundam G Generation MONOEYE GUNDAMS Original release date: JP: 2002/09/26	Release years by system: 2002 – WonderSwan Color
SD Gundam G Generation MONOEYE GUNDAMS Original release date: JP: 2002/09/26	Notes: The first G Generation game that includes original characters with their own unique storyline. Also the first to include Gundam SEED with an early design of the Strike Gundam, placed in the game as a hidden unit. Fans consider the 2005 DS game to be an enhanced remake.
SD Gundam G Generation DA Original release date: JP: 2002/10/31	Release years by system: 2002 – PC
SD Gundam G Generation DA Original release date: JP: 2002/10/31	Notes: A typing tutor game.
SD Gundam G Generation NEO Original release date: JP: 2002/11/28	Release years by system: 2002 – PlayStation 2
SD Gundam G Generation NEO Original release date: JP: 2002/11/28	Notes: First 3D G Generation game, and the first console G Generation that uses combined universe storyline, rather than near faithful adaptations of the original stories. Includes the Strike Gundam and Aegis Gundam from Gundam SEED as bonus units.
SD Gundam G Generation Advance Original release date: JP: 2003/11/27	Release years by system: 2003 – Game Boy Advance
SD Gundam G Generation Advance Original release date: JP: 2003/11/27	Notes: An enhanced remake of GATHER BEAT, including units and characters from Gundam SEED.
SD Gundam G Generation SEED Original release date: JP: 2004/02/19	Release years by system: 2004 – PlayStation 2
SD Gundam G Generation SEED Original release date: JP: 2004/02/19	Notes: Focuses primarily on Gundam SEED and Gundam SEED Astray, with units from the Universal Century, and other four alternate timelines, as bonuses.
SD Gundam G Generation DS Original release date: JP: 2005/05/26	Release years by system: 2005 – Nintendo DS
SD Gundam G Generation DS Original release date: JP: 2005/05/26	Notes: Considered by fans to be an enhanced remake of MONOEYE GUNDAMS, though it focuses on a new original character and storyline. Also the first to include combination attacks, as well as Gundam SEED Destiny characters and units.
Mobile Suit Gundam SEED Destiny: Generation of C.E Original release date: JP: 2005/08/25	Release years by system: 2005 – PlayStation 2
Mobile Suit Gundam SEED Destiny: Generation of C.E Original release date: JP: 2005/08/25	Notes: Focuses on Gundam SEED, Astray, and Gundam SEED Destiny, but diverges from the latter's plot approximately halfway through. Though not officially a G Generation game, it uses the same engine as NEO and SEED, albeit with full-size, cel-shaded mecha instead of super-deformed ones.
SD Gundam G Generation Portable Original release date: JP: 2006/08/03	Release years by system: 2006 – PlayStation Portable
SD Gundam G Generation Portable Original release date: JP: 2006/08/03	Notes: An enhanced remake of G Generation-F, removing most of the manga and video game storylines in favor of adding complete storylines for Gundam SEED and Gundam SEED Destiny. Sidestory units and characters are still present as bonuses.
SD Gundam G Generation Cross Drive Original release date: JP: 2007/08/09	Release years by system: 2007 – Nintendo DS
SD Gundam G Generation Cross Drive Original release date: JP: 2007/08/09	Notes: First true G Generation, excepting Generation of C.E., to include Gundam SEED Astray.
SD Gundam G Generation Spirits Original release date: JP: 2007/11/29	Release years by system: 2007 – PlayStation 2
SD Gundam G Generation Spirits Original release date: JP: 2007/11/29	Notes: Focuses only on the UC timeline up to Victory Gundam, but features a stage referring to the Black History of Turn A Gundam. In this game, certain mobile suits and battleships will take up a different number of "tiles" compared to conventional units. Unlike the previous two PlayStation 2 G-Gen games, Spirits will no longer make use of the 3D combat and battle engine, instead reverting to the original PlayStation and PSP titles' system of battle. This game also incorporates the Haro Points system, which was first introduced in G Generation Portable.
SD Gundam G Generation Wars Original release date: JP: 2009/08/06	Release years by system: 2009 – Wii, PlayStation 2
SD Gundam G Generation Wars Original release date: JP: 2009/08/06	Notes: Debuts Mobile Suit Gundam SEED C.E. 73: Stargazer and Mobile Suit Gundam 00. Using the same system from G Generation Spirits with an additional Wars Break system. This is the largest scale game, including more than 700 characters, more than 700 Mobile Suit units, more than 30 Gundam series, and more than 50 battle stages.
SD Gundam G Generation World Original release date: JP: 2011/02/24	Release years by system: 2011 – Wii, PlayStation Portable
SD Gundam G Generation World Original release date: JP: 2011/02/24	Notes: Features some elements from G Generation Spirits and G Generation Wars, along with new elements. This includes the introduction of the Secret Levels that can be unlocked after 2 Wars Breaks, which means that a character in a large Mobile Suit or Mobile Armor appears. It covers many new Gundam franchises, like Mobile Suit Gundam Unicorn and Mobile Suit Gundam 00 the Movie: Awakening of the Trailblazer, as well as Mobile Suit Gundam 00 Second Season, as well as allowing players to use the other 00 characters alongside 00 Raiser, like Seravee, Cherudim, and Arios Gundams. Some characters from SD Gundam Sangokuden Brave Battle Warriors are also included.
SD Gundam G Generation 3D Original release date: JP: 2011	Release years by system: 2011 – Nintendo 3DS
SD Gundam G Generation Overworld Original release date: JP: 2012/09/27	Release years by system: 2012 – PlayStation Portable
SD Gundam G Generation Overworld Original release date: JP: 2012/09/27	Notes: This is a sequel to G Generation World, with an English fan translation available. It allows you to import your save from G Generation World for a bonus.
SD Gundam G Generation Genesis Original release date: JP/SEA: 2016	Release years by system: 2016 – Nintendo Switch, PlayStation 4, PlayStation Vita
SD Gundam G Generation Genesis Original release date: JP/SEA: 2016	Notes: First to use an English localization for its South East Asia release. The story mode is made up of summarised versions of the following Gundam Universal Century franchises: Mobile Suit Gundam, Mobile Suit Gundam MS IGLOO, Mobile Suit Gundam: The 08th MS Team, Mobile Suit Gundam: Cross Dimension 0079, Mobile Suit Gundam Side Story: The Blue Destiny, Gundam Side Story 0079: Rise from the Ashes, Mobile Suit Gundam: Zeonic Front, Mobile Suit Gundam: Lost War Chronicles, Mobile Suit Gundam Side Story: Space Beyond the Blaze, Mobile Suit Gundam Side Story: Missing Link, Mobile Suit Gundam 0080: War in the Pocket, Mobile Suit Gundam: Battlefield Record U.C. 0081, Mobile Suit Gundam 0083: Stardust Memory, Mobile Suit Gundam Zeta Gundam: A New Translation, Mobile Suit Gundam ZZ, Mobile Suit Gundam: Char's Counterattack, Mobile Suit Gundam Unicorn and Mobile Suit Gundam: Hathaway's Flash.
SD Gundam G Generation Cross Rays Original release date: WW: 2019/11/27	Release years by system: 2019 – Steam, Nintendo Switch, PlayStation 4
SD Gundam G Generation Cross Rays Original release date: WW: 2019/11/27	Notes: The first game to be released in North America, though only via Steam. The story mode is made up of summarised versions of the following Gundam franchises: Mobile Suit Gundam Wing, Mobile Suit Gundam Wing Dual Story G-Unit, Mobile Suit Gundam Wing Endless Waltz, Mobile Suit Gundam SEED, Mobile Suit Gundam SEED Astray, Mobile Suit Gundam SEED X Astray, Mobile Suit Gundam SEED Destiny, Mobile Suit Gundam SEED C.E. 73: Stargazer, Mobile Suit Gundam 00, Mobile Suit Gundam 00F, Mobile Suit Gundam 00 the Movie: Awakening of the Trailblazer, Mobile Suit Gundam: Iron-Blooded Orphans and Mobile Suit Gundam: Iron-Blooded Orphans Gekko.

== Mobile games ==
Game	Details
SD Gundam G Generation-i Original release date: JP: 2003/04/08	Release years by system: 2003 – Mova, Dona
SD Gundam G Generation-i Original release date: JP: 2003/04/08	Notes: The first mobile phone game release.
SD Gundam G Generation-V Original release date: JP: 2004/04/14	Release years by system: 2004 – V App, S! App
SD Gundam G Generation-V Original release date: JP: 2004/04/14	Notes: Almost identical to "i".
SD Gundam G Generation-ii Original release date: JP: 2005/03/18	Release years by system: 2005 – Mova, Dona
SD Gundam G Generation-iii Original release date: JP: 2007/07/10	Release years by system: 2007 – Mova, Dona
SD Gundam G Generation Mobile Original release date: JP: 2009/09/28	Release years by system: 2009 – i-appli
SD Gundam G Generation Mobile Next Universe Original release dates: JP: 2010/11/25	Release years by system: 2010 – i-appli 2012 – Android
SD Gundam G Generation Mobile Next Universe Original release dates: JP: 2010/11/25	Notes: The Android version only installs correctly with Android 2.2, and requires root permissions for anything above that.
SD Gundam G Generation Touch Original release date: JP: 2010/12/15	Release years by system: 2010 – iOS
SD Gundam G Generation Frontier Original release date: JP: 2013/04/11	Release years by system: 2013 – iOS, Android
SD Gundam G Generation Frontier Original release date: JP: 2013/04/11	Notes: An online game. Closed October 26 2017.
SD Gundam G Generation RE Original release date: JP: 2017/08/12	Release years by system: 2017 – iOS, Android
SD Gundam G Generation RE Original release date: JP: 2017/08/12	Notes: An online game. Closed October 30 2018.
SD Gundam G Generation Eternal Original release date: JP: 2025/04/16	Release years by system: 2025 – iOS, Android
SD Gundam G Generation Eternal Original release date: JP: 2025/04/16	Notes: A gacha game with a global release.
