= SD Gundam G Generation Overworld =

2012 video game

- Developer: Namco Bandai Games
- Publisher: Namco Bandai Games
- Series: SD Gundam G Generation
- Platform: PlayStation Portable
- Release: JP: September 27, 2012
- Genre: Tactical role-playing
- Mode: Single player

SD Gundam G Generation Overworld is a strategy game developed and published by Bandai Namco Entertainment. It is the twentieth and last game in the SD Gundam G Generation series, originally released for the PlayStation Portable in 2012.

== Gameplay ==
The player begins the game with a weak Flagship and several original Pilots and units. After the player finishes the stages in a chapter, they will be able to play a boss map to conclude it. The game has a grading system as well as a final boss mission.

Alternatively, the player can play the story mode that will put the player through a subjectively more difficult version of the game.

There are three modes that show the true ending of the game if completed. Core Mode is unlocked by finishing Rank mode (Scatter Mission Mode), Overworld Mode by finishing the extra missions and Core Mode, which contains the final battle of the main saga, and Hell Mode, the final mode of the game, and shows the truth about the story of the game and serves as the epilogue of the saga and therefore, the true ending.

Like the other games in the series, the player's unit gains XP from destroying enemies and when they gain a certain level, they can upgrade them to new units or barter them for units outside of their series or development cycle.

Master Pilots also return to this game. This time, they all have new abilities that impact the game at a larger scale. There are abilities to recharge allied unit energy as well as health and also give the ability to use map attacks after movement.

The grid has a top-down view that is used to encompass the combat including small movies with various animations for different MS.

The game's stages regardless of what campaign the player prefers will have a 'Break mission' and 'Challenge Mission' to complete optionally. If they complete the Break mission, you can trigger different series' characters to enter the stage and other events to occur. The Challenge mission adds in 'Secret' enemies that give you 2-5 grunt units if the player defeats the commander. Otherwise, the stage abruptly ends when all the enemies are destroyed.

A third 'Break mission' is 'Over Impact'. If the guest commander defeats the enemy commander in the determined limit of turns, all guest characters change to orange and act as enemies. 'Over Impact' only affects the main world. A variant that appears outside the main world is 'Core Impact'. In Core Impact, the player's units are randomly chosen to appear as enemies in points around the map.

== Featured series ==
- Mobile Suit Gundam
- Mobile Suit Gundam MS IGLOO
- Mobile Suit Gundam: The 08th MS Team
- Mobile Suit Gundam 0080: War in the Pocket
- Mobile Suit Gundam 0083: Stardust Memory
- Advance of Zeta: The Flag of the Titans
- Mobile Suit Zeta Gundam
- Gundam Sentinel
- Mobile Suit Gundam ZZ
- Mobile Suit Gundam: Char's Counterattack
- Mobile Suit Gundam Unicorn
- Mobile Suit Gundam: Hathaway's Flash
- Mobile Suit Gundam F90
- Mobile Suit Gundam Silhouette Formula 91
- Mobile Suit Gundam F91
- Mobile Suit Crossbone Gundam
- Mobile Suit Crossbone Gundam: Skullheart
- Mobile Suit Crossbone Gundam: Steel Seven
- Mobile Suit Victory Gundam
- Mobile Fighter G Gundam
- New Mobile Report Gundam Wing
- New Mobile Report Gundam Wing Dual Story: G-Unit
- New Mobile Report Gundam Wing: Endless Waltz
- After War Gundam X
- Turn A Gundam
- Mobile Suit Gundam SEED
- Mobile Suit Gundam SEED ASTRAY
- Mobile Suit Gundam SEED X ASTRAY
- Mobile Suit Gundam SEED Destiny
- Mobile Suit Gundam SEED C.E.73 Stargazer
- Mobile Suit Gundam 00
- Mobile Suit Gundam 00 The Movie: A Wakening of the Trailblazer
- Mobile Suit Gundam AGE
- Model Suit Gunpla Builders Beginning G

== Development ==
The game was developed by Bandai Namco Entertainment and published by the same company.
