= Kimitoshi Yamane =

Japanese mecha designer (born 1966)

Kimitoshi Yamane (山根 公利, Yamane Kimitoshi; born 1966) is a Japanese mecha designer. He was born in Kawamoto, Shimane Prefecture, and lives in Hamada, Shimane Prefecture. His representative works include Cowboy Bebop, Infinite Ryvius, The Vision of Escaflowne and the Gundam series.

Yamane's designs are characterised by a sense of industrial product, designed with motifs from real vehicles and weapons, or from war and science fiction films. While Yamane has a deep knowledge of tanks and ships, he has little interest in robot in human form. In the Gundam series, he sometimes designs the main robot Gundam, but his work is basically focused on naval vessels, aircraft and vehicles.

His hobbies include fishing, working on cars, and riding motorcycles. He owns several old cars and would like to try his hand at designing real cars if he gets the chance.

== Biography ==
After graduating from high school, Yamane moved to Tokyo and attended the Animation Department of Chiyoda Technical Art College in Tokyo for two years while working as a newspaper scholarship student.

Yamane belonged to Artmic, (Note: He was only affiliated and not a full-time employee with benefits.) whose main business is planning anime works, where he worked on mecha designs for animation, mainly OVAs, while receiving guidance from Shinji Aramaki, Hideki Kakinuma, and Kenichi Sonoda. He participated in co-productions with foreign countries such as the United States and France, and spent some time in Paris. He was also involved in the remake of Tatsunoko Production's Casshan and Science Ninja Team Gatchaman.

Around the time Artmik went into financial difficulties, Yamane decided to become a freelance designer in 1994, as he began to work for Sunrise on Mobile Fighter G Gundam and made contacts.

Yamane designed the main robot for the first time in The Vision of Escaflowne. However, although his title was main designer, it is more correct to say that he co-designed the robot based on director Shōji Kawamori's first draft.

Yamane participated in Cowboy Bebop from the planning stage. After passing the audition, Yamane was entrusted with the mecha design by director Shinichirō Watanabe, making it his first work as a designer to create a mecha from concept. In episode 19, Wild Horses, he went beyond the position of mecha designer and proposed the plot of the episode. This work was a huge hit, and he also gained recognition as a mecha designer.

Yamane also participated in the next work, Infinite Ryvius, from the early stages, and was involved in creating the concept for the work.

Yamane subsequently worked on Argento Soma, designing a human-shaped mecha to symbolize the work, as well as most of the aircraft and facilities.

However, after those ambitious works, mecha design became increasingly fixed in the Japanese animation industry, and Yamane's free-thinking designs found it difficult to gain approval. Feeling stuck in a rut at work and a sense of entrapment in the industry, he began to think about leaving Tokyo and returning to his hometown to reconsider himself. He then returned to his home town of Shimane in 2000 at the age of 34, got married and found a large plot of land in Hamada City where he built a house. He thought it would be a good place to build a garage for tinkering with his car, so he could use his hobbies in his work, and it would also be a turning point for his career. At first, he was prepared to lose his job in anime, but the internet infrastructure made it easier to exchange image data, and he continued to receive offers of work from Tokyo.

== Main works ==
=== TV series ===
- The Three-Eyed One (1990–1991)
- Mobile Fighter G Gundam (1994–1995)
- The Vision of Escaflowne (1996)
- Cowboy Bebop (1998–1999)
- Infinite Ryvius (1999–2000)
- Argento Soma (2000–2001)
- Overman King Gainer (2002–2003)
- Mobile Suit Gundam SEED (2002–2003)
- Mobile Suit Gundam SEED Destiny (2004–2005)
- Cluster Edge (2005–2006)
- Starship Operators (2005)
- Tide-Line Blue (2005)
- Galaxy Angel II (2006)
- Ergo Proxy (2006)
- Kishin Taisen Gigantic Formula (2007)
- Eureka Seven: AO (2012)
- Space Battleship Yamato 2199 (2013)
- Gundam Reconguista in G (2014)

=== Anime films ===
- Spriggan (1998)
- Escaflowne (2000)
- Cowboy Bebop: The Movie (2001)
- Zeta Gundam: A New Translation II (2005)
- King of Thorn (2010)
- Short Peace (2013)
- Genocidal Organ (2017)
- Gundam Reconguista in G the Movie I〜V (2019–2022)
- Mobile Suit Gundam: Hathaway's Flash (2021)
- Mobile Suit Gundam: Cucuruz Doan's Island (2022)
- Mobile Suit Gundam SEED Freedom (2024)

=== OVA ===
- Bubblegum Crisis (1987–1991)
- Metal Skin Panic MADOX-01 (1988)
- Hades Project Zeorymer (1988–1990)
- Rhea Gall Force (1989)
- A.D. Police: Dead End City (1990)
- Bubblegum Crash (1991)
- Detonator Orgun (1991–1993)
- Gall Force: New Era (1991)
- Casshan: Robot Hunter (1993–1994)
- Genocyber (1994)
- Gatchaman (1994–1995)
- Mobile Suit Gundam: The 08th MS Team (1996–1999)
- Voogie's Angel (1997–1998)
- Mobile Suit Gundam MS IGLOO (2004–2006)
- Mobile Suit Gundam MS IGLOO 2 (2008–2009)
- Five Numbers! (2011)
- Mobile Suit Gundam: The Origin (2015)

=== Video game ===
- Shadow Squadron (1995)

=== Web animation ===
- Mobile Suit Gundam SEED C.E. 73: Stargazer (2006)
- Xam'd: Lost Memories (2008–2009)
- Gundam: Requiem for Vengeance (2024)

== Art books ==
- Yamane, Kimitoshi (January 20, 2008). Yamane Kimitoshi Meka Zukan (山根公利 メカ図鑑) 'Kimitoshi Yamane Mecha Picture Book'. MdN Corporation. ISBN 4-8443-5960-6.
- Yamane, Kimitoshi (February 19, 2024). Yamane Kimitoshi Mekanikku Dezain Shū Mono Gurafu (山根公利メカニックデザイン集 モノGRAPH) 'Kimitoshi Yamane Mechanic Design Collection Mono Graph'. Time. ISBN 4-9091-8515-1.
