= Umanosuke =

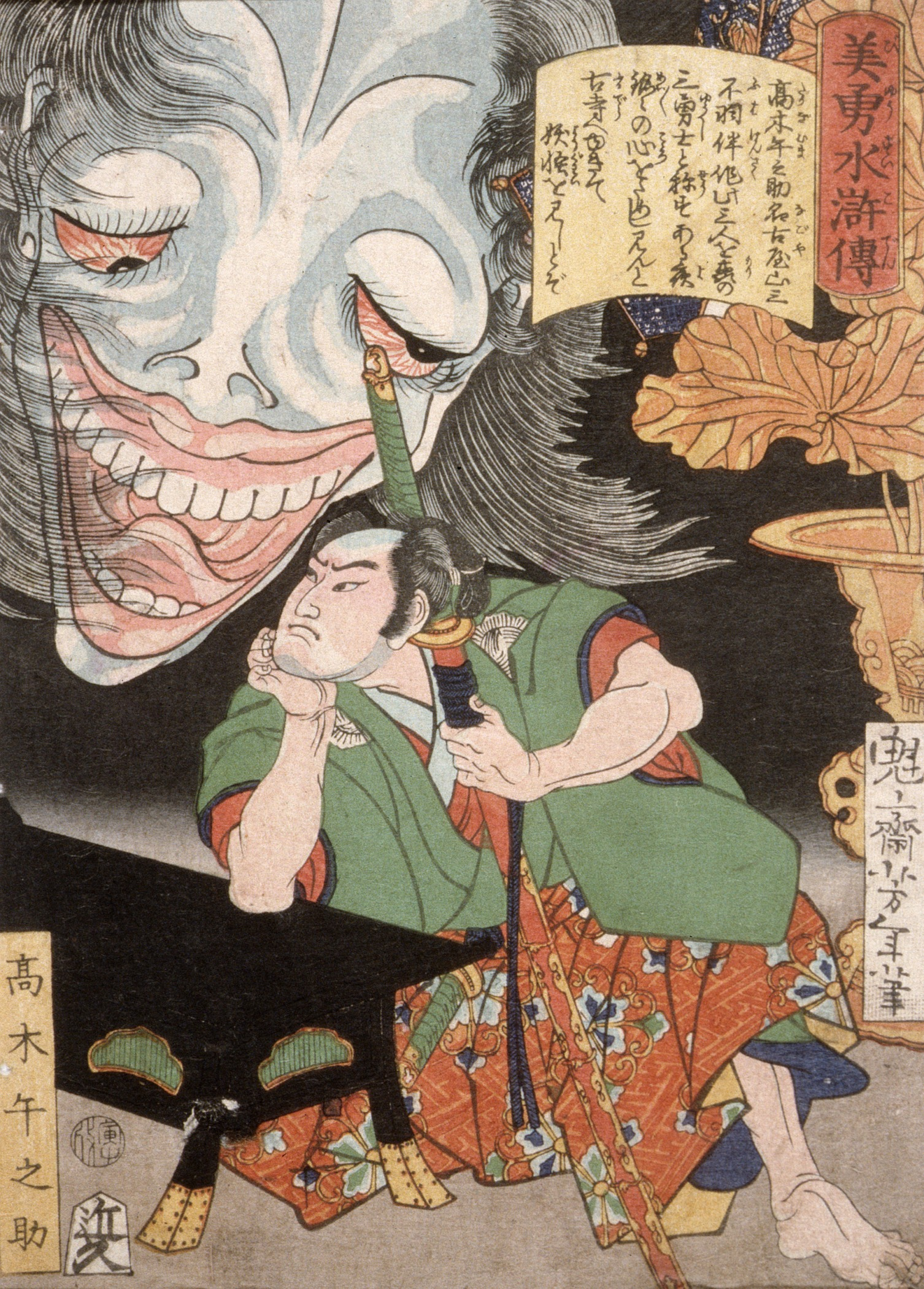
- Umanosuke Takagi (1656–1746), Japanese samurai.
- Pronunciation: ɯmanosɯke (IPA)
- Gender: Male

Origin
- Origin: Japanese
- Meaning: Different meanings depending on the kanji used

Umanosuke is a masculine Japanese given name.

== Written forms ==
Umanosuke can be written using different combinations of kanji characters. Here are some examples:

- 馬之助, "horse, of, help"
- 馬之介, "horse, of, mediate"
- 馬之輔, "horse, of, help"
- 馬之丞, "horse, of, help"
- 馬之甫, "horse, of, begin"
- 午之助, "sign of the horse, of, help"
- 午之介, "sign of the horse, of, mediate"
- 午之輔, "sign of the horse, of, help"
- 午之丞, "sign of the horse, of, help"
- 午之甫, "sign of the horse, of, begin"
- 宇摩之助, "universe, polish, of, help"
- 宇摩之介, "universe, polish, of, mediate"

The name can also be written in hiragana うまのすけ or katakana ウマノスケ.

== Notable people with the name ==
- Umanosuke Iida (飯田 馬之介; 1961–2010), Japanese anime director
- Umanosuke Ueda (上田 馬之助; 1940–2011), Japanese professional wrestler
