= Saharin =

Saharin may refer to one of the following:

- Sakhalin, as transliterated from Russian into katakana (サハリン) and then into English
- Aina Saharin, an ace pilot in Mobile Suit Gundam: The 08th MS Team
- Ginias Saharin, a scientist and rear admiral in Mobile Suit Gundam: The 08th MS Team, older brother of Aina
