= Gundam: Requiem for Vengeance =

2024 Japanese anime series

機動戦士ガンダム 復讐のレクイエム (Kidō Senshi Gandamu Fukushū no Rekuiemu)
- Genre: Mecha, Military science fiction
- Created by: Hajime Yatate; Yoshiyuki Tomino
- Original net animation
- Directed by: Erasmus Brosdau
- Produced by: Ken Iyadomi
- Written by: Gavin Hignight
- Music by: Wilbert Roget II
- Studio: Sunrise; Safehouse
- Licensed by: NA: Sunrise Netflix (streaming)
- Released: October 17, 2024
- Runtime: 23–25 minutes
- Episodes: 6

Gundam: Requiem for Vengeance (機動戦士ガンダム 復讐のレクイエム, Kidō Senshi Gandamu Fukushū no Rekuiemu; "Mobile Suit Gundam: Requiem for Vengeance") is a Japanese English-language web anime series co-produced by Sunrise and Safehouse. Part of the Gundam franchise, made in commemoration of the series' 45th anniversary, it is the second production to be done entirely in computer animation since Mobile Suit Gundam MS IGLOO and the first series animated using Epic Games' Unreal Engine 5. It is written and co-executive produced by Gavin Hignight and directed by Erasmus Brosdau, with mechanical designs by Kimitoshi Yamane, character designs by Manuel Augusto Dischinger Moura, and produced animation and directed sound by Hiroaki Yura. It premiered on Netflix on October 17, 2024.

== Story ==
Taking place during the late stages of the One Year War, it follows Iria Solari, a Principality of Zeon pilot and leader of the "Red Wolves" mobile suit team, who is tasked with defending the European front against the Earth Federation Forces' efforts on reclaiming the area.

== Characters ==
Captain Iria Solari, Red Wolf Squadron, 1st Mobile Suit Company, 7th Battalion
Voiced by: Nanako Mori (Japanese); Celia Massingham (English)
Known as "Red Wolf Alpha" and "Wolf Mother," the leader of the Red Wolf Squadron. Captain Solari is a former concert violinist who joined the Zeon army at the beginning of the One Year War. Her husband Daltun was killed in an air raid several months before the events of the series and she has a young son back in space. Her only memento of her husband is an engraved pocket watch containing a picture of her family, which she hangs on her mobile suit's console before each sortie. She displays developing Newtype abilities, which grant her heightened spatial awareness bordering on precognition. She dismisses this as just instincts honed from military experience. Iria pilots an MS-06F Zaku II F-Type with unique twin commander horns and an all-red paint job. After her original Zaku is destroyed by the Gundam EX, Alfee Zydos's team builds the MS-06Rb-a Zaku II (Unidentified Type) out of scrap parts.

Lieutenant Kneeland LeSean, Red Wolf Squadron, 1st Mobile Suit Company
Voiced by: Shōya Ishige (Japanese); Lavance (English)
Known as "Red Wolf Charlie," Kneeland is the Red Wolf Squadron's most inexperienced member. LeSean is the only surviving member of Red Wolf Squadron aside from Iria after the Gundam EX's initial attack. He pilots an MS-06F Zaku II F-Type, which is later replaced by the MS-06Rb-b Zaku II (Unidentified Type), which is built from scrap parts.

Reid "Chubs" Ghelfi
Voiced by: Shunichi Maki (Japanese); James Watt (English)
Known as "Red Wolf Bravo," "Chubs" is the Red Wolf Squadron's second-in-command.

Kale Zavaleta
Voiced by: Ryūnosuke Watanuki (Japanese); Daniel Wishes (English)
Known as "Red Wolf Delta," Kale is the Red Wolf Squadron's sniper.

Second Lieutenant Ander Heaton
Voiced by: Ryōsuke Hara (Japanese); Andrew Woolner (English)
A Magella Attack tank driver who joins up with Captain Solari's group after his battalion is decimated by the Gundam EX.

Dr. Ony Kasuga, Medical Doctor, UMRC
Voiced by: Takeo Ōtsuka (Japanese); Maxwell Powers (English)
A medic with the neutral UMRC, which provides medical services to both Federation and Zeon forces. Dr. Kasuga joins up with Iria's group as they attempt to escape from the Gundam EX. A pacifist by nature, he frequently questions the point of the war and insists on providing aid to everyone regardless of their allegiance.

Second Lieutenant Hailey Arhun, First Armored Infantry
Voiced by: Maki Kawase (Japanese); Jessica Spies (English)
A member of a Zeon infantry team who joins up with Captain Solari after her original unit is wiped out by a Federation attack. Has a distinctive appearance with dyed hair, multiple facial piercings, and Zeon-themed tattoos.

Captain Alfee "Gearhead" Zydos
Voiced by: Hiroshi Naka (Japanese); Maurice Shelton (English)
A mobile suit mechanic and old friend of Iria's family who helps build Zakus for Iria and Kneeland out of discarded scrap parts.

"Gundam Pilot"
Voiced by: Kazuki Ura (Japanese); Kole Yadon (English)
An unnamed boy with Newtype abilities serving in the Earth Federation army as pilot of the RX-78(G)E Gundam EX.

== Episodes ==
No.	Title	Original release date
1	"Haunted Forest"	October 17, 2024
In the year 0079, a Zeon force moves in to attack an Earth Federation base in Romania, but are ambushed by Federation forces. The elite Red Wolf Zaku unit led by Captain Iria Solari deploys and helps turn the tide of the battle, but when they arrive at the base, they find it completely abandoned. That night, Iria apparently has a premonition of danger just as the Federation stages a surprise attack on the base. A Federation Gundam EX mobile suit then appears and easily destroys the Zeon forces, including the Red Wolves.
2	"Broken"	October 17, 2024
Iria is barely able to escape her wrecked Zaku and rescues one of her squadmates, Kneeland LeSean. She manages to regroup with other Zeon survivors led by Second Lieutenant Hayley Arhun. She orders Hayley to evacuate her men while she and LeSean commandeer abandoned Zaku Tanks. Second Lieutenant Ander Heaton volunteers to drive a fuel truck into position to act as a signal for the evacuation. Iria is able to detonate the fuel truck to temporarily slow down the Gundam and allow Hayley's unit to escape. However, the Gundam EX continues to pursue the convoy into the countryside before being ambushed by a pair of Goufs. Though the Gundam EX easily destroys the Goufs, it inexplicably decides to let the convoy escape.
3	"Junkyard"	October 17, 2024
The convoy arrives at Brigade HQ, but are dismayed to find it has already been destroyed by the Federation. After recovering survivors, they head to a nearby junkyard which is still occupied by Zeon forces and commanded by Major Rolph Ronet and an old friend of Iria's, Captain Alfee Zydos. Alfee confides to the soldiers that Iria's husband Daltum was killed in a Federation airstrike months ago, leaving just her son as her remaining family. Iria then receives another premonition, and spots the Gundam attacking a nearby base. Iria convinces Alfee and the junkyard mechanics to rebuild two Zakus from salvaged parts. Rolf attempts to put a stop to the construction right when the Federation attacks the junkyard, and allows Iria and LeSean to mobilize. Upon boarding their Zakus, they see the Gundam EX and a GM mobile suit approaching.
4	"Night Caller"	October 17, 2024
The mobile suits on both sides engage in a fierce battle, with all of the suits suffering severe damage. Eventually, the GM attempts to withdraw and LeSean disobeys orders and pursues it into the forest. Both Iria and LeSean manage to corner the crippled GM while the Gundam EX attempts to protect it, but upon seeing the GM pilot attempting to bail out, Iria orders LeSean to hold fire. The Gundam EX then recovers the GM pilot before retreating. Rolf is shaken by the fact the attack cost so many lives, but Alfee reminds him he has a duty to protect his remaining men. Hayley is distraught to learn her unit was wiped out. Rolf then attempts to arrest Iria and LeSean before being interrupted by the arrival of Major General Kellerne. Kellerne briefs Iria, explaining the war is turning against Zeon due to the mass production of GMs, and he orders Iria to steal one so that it can be studied for weaknesses.
5	"The River"	October 17, 2024
Iria, Alfee, Hayley, and Ander disguise themselves as Federations soldiers and steal a Federation transport, but are forced to ditch it and travel on foot after being ambushed by a pair of Midnight Goufs. On the way to the Federation base, Alfee muses that Iria may be a Newtype, an evolved human being due to her premonitions. They manage to infiltrate the base, and Iria comes across a boy genius she has an odd feeling about. Despite their cover being blown, Iria and Alfee are each able to hijack a GM, but the Gundam EX then appears and disables Alfee's GM. Iria realizes the Gundam EX is being piloted by the boy she met earlier. The Gundam EX disables Iria's GM, and LeSean arrives in his Zaku and sacrifices himself to give Iria and her team the opportunity to escape.
6	"Convoy to Oblivion"	October 17, 2024
Iria wakes up to find herself in an evacuation convoy heading for Odessa Spaceport to escape back to space, but the city is already under attack by the Federation. She is left shaken at the fact that her entire unit is dead, and that the Gundam EX's pilot is a young, scared boy not much older than her son. With Federation forces already in the city, Iria volunteers to pilot her Zaku to help defend the convoy despite her injuries. As Iria and the Zeon forces mount a fierce defense, the Gundam EX finally arrives on the field. Iria manages to buy enough time for the HLV-8 carrying her friends to launch and reach space safely, and she asks the Gundam EX pilot to cease hostilities and allow Zeon to retreat since they have lost. The Gundam EX pilot knocks Iria in her Zaku out of the falling HLV-9 upon finding out Iria is a mother, only to be killed by another Midnight mobile suit, to Iria's horror. After the battle, Iria notes that the new Federation mobile suits have turned the tide of the war against Zeon, and she has joined a Zeon remnant force in Africa and continues to fight in hopes of ending all wars that would force children to fight.

== Production ==
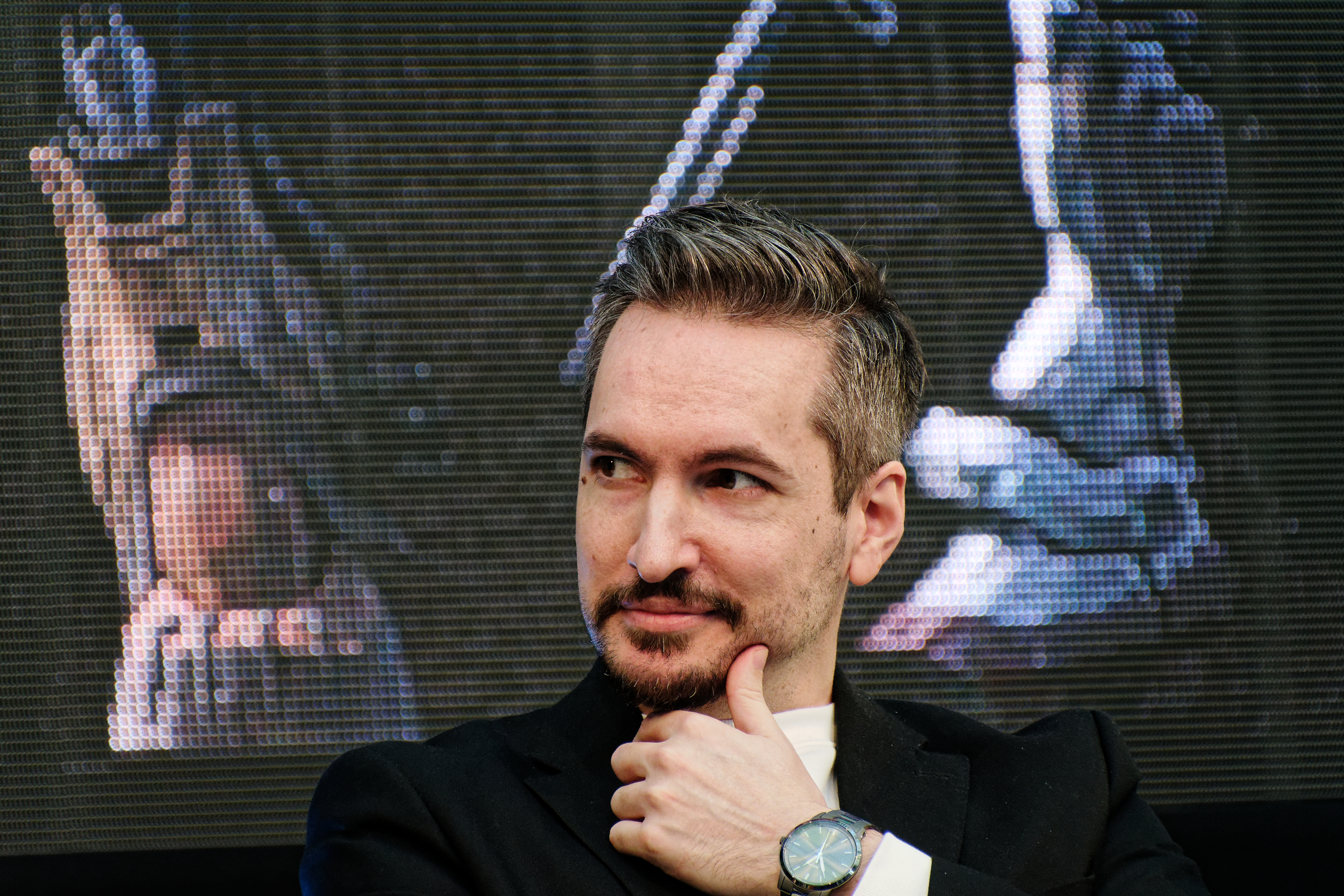
Erasmus Brosdau 2024

During Anime Expo in July 2023, Bandai Namco Filmworks revealed that they are producing a new original anime series that is directed by Erasmus Brosdau and written by Gavin Hignight, albeit no distributor was announced. Manuel Augusto Dischinger Moura designed the characters, and Wilbert Roget II composed the series' music. The series is led by Australian actress Celia Massingham as main protagonist Iria Solari; she also performed motion capture for the animation.

== Release ==
In early December 2023, Netflix announced that it will distribute the series globally. The series premiered on October 17, 2024.

== Notes ==
Preceded by Mobile Suit Gundam SEED Freedom	Gundam metaseries (production order); 2024	Succeeded by Mobile Suit Gundam: Silver Phantom; Mobile Suit Gundam GQuuuuuuX
Preceded by Mobile Suit Gundam	Gundam Universal Century timeline U.C. 0079–0080	Succeeded by Mobile Suit Gundam: The 08th MS Team; Mobile Suit Gundam Thunderbolt; Mobile Suit Gundam 0080: War in the Pocket
