= Towa no Quon =

Japanese anime film series

- Theatrical release poster

トワノクオン (Towa no Kuon)
- Genre: Fantasy, Action
- Anime film series
- Directed by: Umanosuke Iida; Takeshi Mori (Note: Although credited as the "assistant director" for the series, Mori took charge of the project after director Iida passed away.)
- Produced by: Jun Yukawa; Makoto Watanabe; Osamu Hosokawa; Hisato Usui; Toshiaki Dōshita; Masato Yukita
- Written by: Toshizo Nemoto
- Music by: Kenji Kawai
- Studio: Bones
- Licensed by: AUS: Madman Entertainment; NA: Sentai Filmworks; UK: Manga Entertainment
- Released: June 18, 2011 – November 26, 2011
- Runtime: 50–60 minutes (each)
- Films: 6

Towa no Quon (Japanese: トワノクオン, Hepburn: Towa no Kuon; lit. "Eternal Quon", officially stylized in Japan as TOWANOQUON), is a 2011 Japanese animated supernatural film series consisting of six films and directed by Umanosuke Iida. The first film in the series was released in theaters on June 18, 2011 and the last on November 26, 2011. The film series has been licensed by Sentai Filmworks in North America.

== Plot ==
In a futuristic Tokyo, unique human beings who have awakened distinct powers are being hunted by a secret organization named Custos. Known as "Attractors", these exceptional humans are joining forces to defend themselves. They are led by a boy named Quon, an idealist who is determined to save all the Attractors he can.

== Cast ==
=== Attractors ===
Quon (クオン, Kuon)
Voiced by: Hiroshi Kamiya (Japanese); Corey Hartzog (English)
The protagonist, Quon has actually lived for over a millennium. Born in a village that was home to the first Attractors, Quon's powers manifest when he witnesses his family and village being slaughtered and, in a rage, avenged them. However, in his fury, Quon realized he had also slaughtered innocent people as well. He now aims to pave the way for a future of peace and acceptance. Unlike other Attractors seen, he has exhibited more than one power, including transforming into a fighting form designated by Custos as Insania. In that state, Quon has exceptional speed and strength, manipulations of water, metal (or mechanical objects) and, possibly nature itself, and self-regeneration. His younger brother Towa sealed himself away into the crystal known as the Tokitsu Namida and gave Quon immortality. Quon never knew this until in chapter 5, when he regained consciousness and found himself in the room Kannazuki was hiding. During the events of Chapter 6, Towa unsealed Quon's true form and powers so he could defeat Kamishiro, at the cost of Towa's life. Afterwards, Quon seems to have lost his immortality. His full name is Quon Miduchi (三鎚久遠).
Yuri (ユリ)
Voiced by: Ryoko Shiraishi (Japanese); Jessica Boone (English)
A flirty, risque attractor, and friend of Quon. She has exceptional speed, or something to that effect. Although she cares about the exterior, she is not completely self-centered, aiding her friends in times of need. Like some attractors, her powers are limited. She is able to maintain super speed for at least twenty minutes before tiring, and wears a special suit to protect her skin from rashes caused by her velocity. Her full name is Yuriko Akatsuki (暁由里子).
Kiri (キリ)
Voiced by: Saori Hayami (Japanese); Emily Neves (English)
A young, innocent girl whose power is her voice. With it, she can heal, or destroy. Her power fluctuates with her emotions, and seem to have their limits the more she uses them. Kiri's parents died in a fire, so she currently lives with her grandmother. Her full name is Kiri Jougasaki (城ヶ崎綺璃).
Tei (テイ)
Voiced by: Kaori Nazuka (Japanese); Monica Rial (English)
A humble woman, especially towards Quon (through use of honorific expression--sama). Tei has telepathic abilities that allow her to communicate with others from afar. But left out of her control, her power can cause chaos by having people relive hurtful memories. In Chapter 4, it was thought she has romantic feelings for Shun, but however, the character designer Toshihiro Kawamoto and producer Makoto Watanabe has dismissed this, and has said that Shun and Tei's relationships are platonic rather than romantic, according to a radio interview by Sokoani. Her full name is Tei Ryumonji (龍紋寺薙).
Miu (ミウ)
Voiced by: Chiaki Omigawa (Japanese); Hilary Haag (English)
A young, animal loving girl who carries a notepad and pencils for sketching. She has the power to communicate to animals, and is constantly surrounded by them, which are adorned with a tiny pink bow. Her Power Limiter enables her to speak normally, though she usually talks in the language of an animal. Her full name is Miu Misaki (美咲深夕).
Takao (タカオ)
Voiced by: Miyu Irino (Japanese); Karl Glusman (English)
Takao is a complacent, somewhat lazy, smart talking attractor. He's always criticizing Quon about his avid attempts to save all the attractors, but still has an immense amount of respect for him. Although he doesn't seem to care, he uses his powers when absolutely necessary. Takao is a teleporter, with adverse effects. When he teleports, he injures himself, resulting in a twisted limb, or a broken bone. His full name is Takao Senba (千場たかお).
Ryō (リョウ)
Voiced by: Tatsuhisa Suzuki (Japanese); Adam Gibbs (English)
An intelligent, support-type attractor. Ryō is a technopath, able to control technology at his whim, infiltrating video feeds, disabling security systems, preventing tracking to some degree. When he uses his power, four probes come out of his back, and aid him in his exploits. He is usually seen with Miu. His full name is Ryou Sakamaki (坂巻亮).
Yūma (ユーマ)
Voiced by: Mikako Komatsu (Japanese); Ty Doran (English)
A young and naive boy whose power is not titled. When he gets upset or angry, his body transforms into a goliath-like creature who erupts with colored orbs. Although he can't control the orbs, they usually fly off toward the general direction of the aggressor. When the orbs come into contact with objects, they disintegrate matter, leaving crater-sized holes in their wake. Thanks to Quon, he finally came to understand his powers. In chapter 5, he also demonstrated the ability to create barriers. His full name is Yuma Kazui. (数井勇馬).
Kannazuki (神無月)
Voiced by: Tōru Ōkawa (Japanese); David Wald (English)
A kind gardener and caretaker. He does not have any powers. He is a part of the Order, which is the group that controls Custos. His family were protecting the Tokitsu Namida, which is a crystal containing Quon's younger brother, Towa, and is protecting Quon himself. His full name is Seiji Kannazuki (神無月星志)
Wakatsuki (若月)
Voiced by: Sanae Kobayashi (Japanese); Elizabeth Bunch (English)
The doctor in the Attractors' team. Just like Kannazuki, she doesn't have any powers. Her full name is Midori Wakatsuki (若月みどり).
Shun Kazami (風見瞬)
Voiced by: Kōsuke Toriumi (Japanese); David Matranga (English)
A 21-year-old Attractor with fire manipulative powers who was originally with the Custos as the cyborg soldier designated Epsilon. He is generally a pure and naive person, yet the events that led him to becoming a member of the WTOC made him slightly bitter. Prior to joining Custos, Shun was a high school student with a younger sister who was also a Larva like he was. When she entered a larva Burst stage, Shun's own Attractor powers activated and he unknowingly incinerated her as well as their parents. Unable to bear the trauma, before enlisting in the WTOC program Shun placed himself under the delusion that his sister was murdered by the creature that is her Attractor form and saw all Attractors as monsters that deserve to die. However, during the events where he is in a world based on his dreams with Tei, who resembles his sister, Shun regains his memories of how she truly died. As a result, he underwent a larva Burst with his cyborg parts enhancing his Attractor abilities as he gains full control of himself without a power limiter. He defected from Custos and joined the Attractors, realizing their true intentions while managing to win their trust after saving Tei and Kiri from the Custos. He sacrifices himself in chapter 6 in order to open the blocked path to save Tei and the others, escaping from the Custos building as it collapses, leaving his last words "A human's possibility is unlimited".
Towa (トワ)
Voiced by: Hiroki Shimowada (Japanese); Luci Christian (English)
Quon's younger brother from 1,000 years ago, believing that they should use their powers to help others despite what their village said. Towa's powers amplifies others. In chapter 5, Kamishiro wanted Towa's powers to further increase his own. His full name is Towa Miduchi (三鎚永久)

=== Custos ===
Genji Kamishiro (上代源治)
Voiced by: Shinichiro Miki (Japanese); Andrew Love (English)
The commander of Custos, a cold-hearted man who claims that the capture and killing of larva is for the sake of order. However, Kamishiro is actually a Larva who can take the powers of others as his own, and he decided to abuse his power for world domination. In Chapter 6, he absorbed a portion of Towa's powers and tried to turn all the humans in the facility into larva. He was defeated by Quon when Towa overloaded Quon's powers, and lost all of his abilities due to overuse and Quon's pressure in the fight.
Cyborg Alpha (サイボーグ･アルファ)
Voiced by: Jōji Nakata (Japanese); Justin Doran (English)
The leader of the cyborg army WTOC (Weaponed Terminator of Custos), his real name is Kaitou (海藤) and is loyal to Kamishiro. In the official website, it is revealed he is 35 years old and 183 centimeters tall. He was destroyed by Shun in Chapter 6.
Cyborg Beta (サイボーグ･ベータ)
Voiced by: Teruyuki Tanzawa (Japanese); Sam Roman (English)
Originally a 28-year-old American named Harry, he was scouted by Alpha for the WTOC program.
Cyborg Gamma (サイボーグ･ガンマ)
Voiced by: Kenta Miyake (Japanese); Leraldo Anzaldua (English)
Originally a 27-year-old Frenchman named Ray, he was scouted for the WTOC program. He often reads books when off duty. He was destroyed by Shun in Chapter 6.
Cyborg Delta (サイボーグ･デルタ)
Voiced by: Minako Kotobuki (Japanese); Shelley Calene-Black (English)
The second newest member of the Custos, and the only female cyborg in the WTOC. Her real name is Hizuru Asuka (飛鳥ひずる). Hizuru is the shortest among the army, being 164 cm (65 in), as well as the second youngest by age 22. She has feelings for Shun, his defection causing her to start doubting Custos's methods. In chapter 5, she becomes confused after Shun speaks to her, which affects her ability to do her missions. In Chapter 6, she is forced to fight Shun via control device. She manages to free herself, and intervenes in the fight between Shun and Alpha and is mortally wounded, shutting down as she finally understands what Shun fought for, and died knowing humanity was more important than the ideal order Custos envisioned.

== Episodes ==
1. The Ephemeral Petal (泡沫の花弁, Utakata no Kaben): 18 June 2011
2. Dancing Orchid in Chaos (混沌の蘭舞, Konton no Ranbu): 16 July 2011
3. The Complicity of Dreams (夢幻の連座, Mugen no Renza): 13 August 2011
4. The Roaring Anxiety (紅蓮の焦心, Guren no Shōshin): 10 September 2011
5. The Return of the Invincible (双絶の来復, Sōzetsu no Raifuku): 5 November 2011
6. Eternal Quon (永久の久遠, Towa no Kuon): 26 November 2011

== See also ==
- Japanese films of 2011
