= Takaya Hashi =

Japanese voice actor (1952–2025)

- 土師 孝也
- Born: Takaya Katō; 8 September 1952
- Died: 27 August 2025 (aged 72)
- Education: Toho Gakuen College of Drama and Music
- Occupations: Voice actor; business executive
- Years active: 1974–2025
- Notable work: Toki in Fist of the North Star; Kakuzu in Naruto; Vearn in Dragon Quest: The Adventure of Dai; Donovan Desmond in Spy × Family

Takaya Katō (加藤 孝也, Katō Takaya; 8 September 1952 – 27 August 2025), known professionally as Takaya Hashi (土師 孝也, Hashi Takaya), was a Japanese voice actor. He voiced Toki in Fist of the North Star, Kakuzu in Naruto, Vearn in Dragon Quest: The Adventure of Dai, and Donovan Desmond in Spy × Family. He was a representative director at the talent agency Apte Pro until his death.

== Life and career ==
Takaya Hashi, a native of Tokyo, was born on 8 September 1952. He graduated from Musashi Institute of Technology High School and Toho Gakuen College of Drama and Music Department of Arts, where he was a theatre major.

Hashi was originally a member of the Seinenza Theater Company, joining in April 1974 and having major roles in some of their plays. Hashi also appeared in television dramas, appearing in Aoi, Chūgakusei Nikki, Shinjitsu Ichiro, Tengoku made no Hyaku Mile, and Yumemiru Budō.

After voicing some characters in the 1983 anime Aura Battler Dunbine and Galactic Whirlwind Sasuraiger, Hashi voiced Toki, a major character in the Fist of the North Star anime, before voicing Ernest Mecklinger in Legend of the Galactic Heroes, Kurosaki in Patlabor: The TV Series, and Jubei Yagyu in Yaiba. He subsequently voiced Kakuzu in Naruto, James Black in Case Closed, Pharaoh 90 in Sailor Moon Crystal, Donovan Desmond in Spy × Family, and Vearn in Dragon Quest: The Adventure of Dai (2020–2022).

In video games, he voiced Skull Face in Metal Gear Solid V: Ground Zeroes (2014) and Metal Gear Solid V: The Phantom Pain (2015), Slayer in Guilty Gear Xrd -REVELATOR- (2015) and Guilty Gear Strive (2021) (until Season 4), Yoseph Calvert in Astral Chain (2019), Fugen in Monster Hunter Rise (2021), and Triton in Xenoblade Chronicles 3 (2022). He also made posthumous appearances as Takeda Shingen in Nioh 3 (2026) and Doctor Doom in Marvel Tōkon: Fighting Souls (2026) He also dubbed several characters portrayed by Alec Baldwin and Alan Rickman, including Severus Snape in the Harry Potter film series.

Despite his advanced age, Hashi remained in voice acting during his senior years, and his voice acting career lasted several decades. Joshua Fox of Screen Rant called Hashi a "true anime legend", citing his deep voice and ability to improve even at an advanced age. Robert Ito of The New York Times called Hashi "[one] of Japan's top voice actors".

Hashi served as representative director for talent agency Apte Pro until his death.

Hashi died from a heart attack on 27 August 2025, at the age of 72.

== Selected filmography ==
=== Television animation ===
- Aura Battler Dunbine (1983), Shunka Zama, Admiral Scott
- Fist of the North Star (1985), Toki
- Crying Freeman (1988), Ryuji Hanayama
- Patlabor: The TV Series (1989), Kurosaki
- Moomin (1990–1991), Police Inspector
- Yaiba (1993), Jubei Yagyu
- Case Closed (1996), James Black, Jun Omura, Sotaro Goshi
- Trigun (1998), Sheriff
- Outlaw Star (1998), Gilliam
- Cowboy Bebop (????), Teddy Bomber
- One Piece, Dogstorm
- Human Crossing (2003), Aizawa
- Fullmetal Alchemist (2003), Majhal
- Tide-Line Blue (2005), Cpt. Gould
- Black Lagoon (2006), Vice President
- Naruto (2008), Kakuzu
- Fafner in the Azure, Kyōhei Mizoguchi
- Sailor Moon Crystal (2014–2016), Pharaoh 90
- Descending Stories: Showa Genroku Rakugo Shinju (2016), Head Boss
- Onihei (2017), Shugoro Hakabi/Kawagoe
- Princess Principal (2017), Duke of Normandy
- Beastars (2019), Chief Lion
- Food Wars!: Shokugeki no Soma (2020), Heigoro Tokiyama
- Dragon Quest: The Adventure of Dai (2020–2022), Vearn
- Our Last Crusade or the Rise of a New World (2020), Great Apostles
- Yashahime (2020), Bokusen-Oh
- Suppose a Kid from the Last Dungeon Boonies Moved to a Starter Town (2021), Sou
- Getter Robo Arc (2021), Komei
- Golden Kamuy, Shirosuke Inudō
- Overlord IV (2022), Fluder Paradyne
- Spy × Family, Donovan Desmond
- Edens Zero, Poseidon Nero
- Four Knights of the Apocalypse (2023), Gowther (Elder Disguise)
- Tales of Wedding Rings (2024), Emperor
- Tower of God (2024), Madoraco
- New Panty & Stocking with Garterbelt (2025), Stocking (New Gaddessified)

=== Original video animation ===
- Legend of the Galactic Heroes (1988), Ernest Mecklinger
- Patlabor: The New Files (1990), Kurosaki
- Doomed Megalopolis (1991), Noritsugu Hayakawa
- Mighty Space Miners (1994), Noda
- Sanctuary (1996), Tokai
- Hajime no Ippo: Mashiba vs. Kimura (2003), Kimura's father
- New Fist of the North Star (2003), Roushi

=== Original net animation ===
- Spirit of Wonder (2001), Gordon Lindoverberg
- Baki Hanma (2021), Gerry Strydum
- Fate/Grand Carnival (2021), James Moriarty
- Pluto (2023), Superintendent Tawashi

=== Theatrical animation ===
- Sekiro: No Defeat (2026), Owl

=== Video games ===
- Drakengard 2 (2005), General Oror
- Fist of the North Star: Twin Blue Stars of Judgment (2007), Toki
- Bravely Default (2012), Argent Heinkel
- Dragon's Dogma (2012), Daimon
- Metal Gear Solid V: Ground Zeroes (2014), Skull Face
- The Evil Within (2014), Marcelo Jimenez
- Guilty Gear Xrd -REVELATOR- (2015), Slayer
- Metal Gear Solid V: The Phantom Pain (2015), Skull Face
- Uncharted 4: A Thief's End (2016), Gabriel Roman
- Fate/Grand Order (2017), James Moriarty
- Dragon Quest Rivals (2017), Baramos
- Dragon Quest XI: Echoes of an Elusive Age (2017), Auroral Serpent
- Zero Escape: The Nonary Games (2017), Ace
- Gintama Rumble (2018), Sadasada Tokugawa
- Astral Chain (2019), Yoseph Calvert
- Sekiro: Shadows Die Twice (2019), Owl
- Guilty Gear Strive (2021), Slayer (until Season 4)
- Monster Hunter Rise (2021), Fugen
- Tactics Ogre: Reborn (2022), Warren Omon
- Xenoblade Chronicles 3 (2022), Triton
- Infinity Strash: Dragon Quest The Adventure of Dai (2023), Vearn
- Octopath Traveler II (2023), Roque
- Disney: Twisted Wonderland (2023), Neji
- Final Fantasy VII Rebirth (2024), Gi Nattak
- Marvel Tokon: Fighting Souls (2026), Doctor Doom (posthumous)

=== Live-action television ===
- Aoi (2000)
- Chūgakusei Nikki (????)
- Shinjitsu Ichiro (????)
- Tengoku made no Hyaku Mile (2001)
- Yumemiru Budō (2005)
