= Aoharu × Machinegun =

Japanese manga series

- Cover of Aoharu × Kikanjū volume 1 by Square Enix

青春×機関銃 (Aoharu × Kikanjū)
- Genre: Action, comedy, airsoft
- Manga
- Written by: Naoe
- Published by: Gangan Comics
- English publisher: NA: Yen Press
- Magazine: Monthly GFantasy
- Original run: January 3, 2013 – August 18, 2019
- Volumes: 18
- Anime television series
- Directed by: Hideaki Nakano
- Produced by: Atsushi Aitani; Tadakazu Hirada; Yūki Kurosaki; Hiromichi Ōishi; Rie Shimai; Yasuhiro Yamaguchi
- Written by: Kenji Konuta
- Music by: Asami Tachibana
- Studio: Brain's Base
- Licensed by: AUS: Madman Entertainment; NA: Sentai Filmworks; UK: Anime Limited
- Original network: TBS, MBS, CBC, TUT, BS-TBS, TBS Channel 1
- Original run: July 3, 2015 – September 18, 2015
- Episodes: 12 + OVA

Aoharu × Machinegun (Japanese: 青春×機関銃, Hepburn: Aoharu × Kikanjū) is a Japanese manga series by Naoe, serialized in Gangan Comics' shōnen manga magazine Monthly GFantasy from January 2013 to August 2019 and collected in eighteen tankōbon volumes. An anime television series adaptation was announced and aired from July 3 to September 18, 2015.

== Characters ==
=== Toy Gun Gun ===
Hotaru Tachibana (立花 蛍, Tachibana Hotaru)
Voiced by: Mikako Komatsu (Japanese); Monica Rial (English)

Hotaru is the Student Council President of her high school and is known for her brute strength, good reflexes, and a strong sense of justice. She claims to not let "evil doers" get away with their evil deeds, and is often noted to enjoy picking fights for the sake of what's right. Early examples include her beating up a student who was extorting money from a helpless classmate, and desiring revenge after learning that her best friend, Kanae, was conned by a Host (later going after said host on her quest for justice). She is often mistaken as male due to her appearance. She is next door neighbors with Masamune. Hotaru uses illeism, referring to herself as "Tachibana".

Masamune Matsuoka (松岡 正宗, Matsuoka Masamune)
Voiced by: Tomoaki Maeno (Japanese); Corey Hartzog (English)

Masamune works as a Host, and is responsible for introducing Hotaru to the world of "Survival Games". He, together with his childhood friend, Tooru, form an alliance called the "Toy ☆ Gun Gun Team". He is unaware of the fact that Hotaru is actually female. To repay the damages caused by Hotaru to the club at which he works at, he offers her the chance to become a member of his team. Because of his past, he has abandonment issues, which later cause him to kick Hotaru out of the team, fearing she will leave him like his former friends/teammates and mother did. However, after Hotaru helps him face his past through a one-on-one challenge, he lets her rejoin. After Hotaru rejoins the team he develops feelings for her, but struggles with them as he does not know that Hotaru is female. There was a moment in his past where, after being abandoned by his mother, he grew suicidal. Nagamasa introduced him to survival games to convince him to live on.

Tōru Yukimura (雪村 透, Yukimura Tōru)
Voiced by: Yoshitsugu Matsuoka (Japanese); Chris Patton (English)

Tooru is a manga artist who specializes in erotic comics. He is Masamune's childhood friend, both of them having shared the same dream of pursuing soccer as a career when they were young. He lives in the same apartment block as his teammates. Due to his past, when he was betrayed by friends he trusted, he has low self-confidence and often worries that Masamune might abandon him. He is also the most sensitive to others, being the first one to notice changes in the member's moods.

Haruki Hosokawa (細川 春樹, Hosokawa Haruki)

Haruki was the third member of Toy Gun Gun before Hotaru, who blamed Masamune for making him hate survival games. In truth, Haruki was overwhelmed by his younger twin brother Haruka during TGC and left the team because he felt that he wasn't strong enough. He intended to return to the team after he had trained significantly, but was surprised to hear that Hotaru had filled his spot. Although first antagonistic towards Hotaru, he eventually warms up to her and was brought back into the team as their fourth member. Haruki is also the first one of the team to find out that Hotaru is female. He wears a gas mask during his games.

=== Hoshishiro ===
Nagamasa Midori (緑 永将, Midori Nagamasa)
Voiced by: Kazuyuki Okitsu (Japanese); Greg Ayres (English)

Nagamasa is the leader of the survival game team Hoshishiro, which is the name of the hospital he works as a doctor at along with his teammates Fujimon and Ichi. He initially appears to be a very kind man, but he is the object of Tooru and Masamune's resentment due to what took place in the past. It is revealed that he beat up two former Toy Gun Gun players, but it was all within the rules of TGC. He and Masamune used to be close partners, but after being told by another survival game player that Masamune was also a strong vanguard, Nagamasa was convinced to end their partnership. Although brutal during survival games, Nagamasa is known to show kindness outside of it. He knows that Hotaru is a girl but kept a secret though it ended being a blackmail for Hotaru.

Takatora Fujimoto (藤本 高虎, Fujimoto Takatora)
Voiced by: Ryōhei Kimura (Japanese); Scott Gibbs (English)

Nicknamed Fujimon, he is a member of Hoshishiro and works at hospital alongside the rest of his teammates. He fights using a minigun and can move fast despite the weight of his weapon. Due to his earnest and easy-going personality, he gets along well with Hotaru and often expresses concern for the Toy Gun Gun members.

Ichi Akabane (赤羽 市, Akabane Ichi)
Voiced by: Eri Kitamura (Japanese); Allison Sumrall (English)

Ichi is Hoshishiro's sniper. She appears to work as a nurse in the same hospital with Nagamasa and Takatora. She is the newest member of the team, brought in after Haruka's departure. As such she is unaware of the team's history, nor of Nagamasa's past with Masamune.

Haruka Hosokawa (細川 春花, Hosokawa Haruka)

Haruka is Haruki's younger twin brother, who was the original third member of Hoshishiro until Haruki stopped playing survival games. Haruka has an obsession with his brother, and feels guilty for being the reason why Haruki quit survival games. He eventually returns to Hoshishiro, but unlike the other members of the team he expresses distrust for Nagamasa, finding it difficult to tell what he's planning. He hates when other people call his brother 'Haruharu'.

=== Others ===
Hanako Sagara (相楽 華子, Sagara Hanako)
Voiced by: Kana Ueda (Japanese); Allison Keith-Shipp (English)

Hanako is a close friend of Masamune. During a practice match, Hotaru temporarily becomes a member of her team and she instructs her to observe how the game is played.

Kanae Yajima (矢島 鼎, Yajima Kanae)
Voiced by: Yui Horie (Japanese); Shenae'a Moore (English)

Kanae is Hotaru's friend, and is the only one who knows of Hotaru being a girl (besides Haruki and Nagamasa, who find out later).

== Media ==
=== Manga ===
Aoharu × Machinegun is written and illustrated by Naoe. It started serialization in Square Enix's shōnen manga magazine Monthly GFantasy as a one-shot, on June 18, 2012, and later as a full-fledged series, on January 18, 2013. The manga ended on August 18, 2019. Eighteen tankōbon volumes were released.

No.	Original release date	Original ISBN	English release date	English ISBN
1	July 28, 2013	978-4-7575-4020-0	October 25, 2016	978-0-3163-5496-7
2	July 28, 2013	978-4-7575-4021-7	December 20, 2016	978-0-3163-5821-7
3	November 27, 2013	978-4-7575-4152-8	February 21, 2017	978-0-3163-1648-4
4	April 27, 2014	978-4-7575-4298-3	April 18, 2017	978-0-3163-1650-7
5	September 28, 2014	978-4-7575-4431-4	June 20, 2017	978-0-3163-1652-1
6	February 28, 2015	978-4-7575-4574-8	August 22, 2017	978-0-3164-3568-0
7	June 28, 2015	978-4-7575-4680-6	November 7, 2017	978-0-3164-3570-3
8	October 27, 2015	978-4-7575-4784-1	December 19, 2017	978-0-3164-3571-0
9	March 26, 2016	978-4-7575-4936-4	February 27, 2018	978-0-3164-1604-7
10	August 27, 2016	978-4-7575-5037-7	April 24, 2018	978-1-9753-0030-2
11	April 27, 2017	978-4-7575-5337-8	June 26, 2018	978-1-9753-0031-9
12	July 27, 2017	978-4-7575-5424-5	August 21, 2018	978-1-9753-5483-1
13	December 27, 2017	978-4-7575-5571-6	October 30, 2018	978-1-9753-0244-3
14	April 27, 2018	978-4-7575-5704-8	January 22, 2019	978-1-9753-2874-0
15	September 27, 2018	978-4-7575-5863-2	April 23, 2019	978-1-9753-3029-3
16	May 27, 2019	978-4-7575-6141-0	January 28, 2020	978-1-9753-3284-6
17	September 27, 2019	978-4-7575-6320-9	April 21, 2020	978-1-9753-0880-3
18	September 27, 2019	978-4-7575-6321-6	July 21, 2020	978-1-9753-0883-4
18.5	September 27, 2019	978-4-7575-6276-9	—	—

=== Anime ===
An anime television series adaptation produced by Brain's Base and directed by Hideaki Nakano premiered on July 2, 2015, (Note: TBS uses an after-midnight programming schedule, so that the first broadcast took place on July 2, 2015, at 25:46, which is July 3 at 1:46 am JST. The same with CBC, where it was broadcast an hour and a minute after the premiere.) at TBS. It also aired at CBC at the same date and at MBS, TUT, and BS-TBS at later dates. The anime is licensed by AnimeLab in Australia and New Zealand and streamed it on their website as it aired in Japan. The anime has also been licensed in North America by Sentai Filmworks.

No.	Title	Original release date
1	"Let's Start This Deathless Death Match"; Transliteration: "Shinanai Koroshiai wo Hajimeyou ka" (Japanese: 死なない殺し合いを始めようか)	July 3, 2015
Hotaru Tachibana, a lively headstrong student council president, is an individual who strives to fight strong people and always goes by the word "justice". What few people fail to realize is that he is in fact a she! On her way home, Hotaru meets a strange and mysterious man talking on the phone by her apartment door. After a not so pleasant first meeting, the man introduces himself as Masamune Matsuoka with Hotaru vowing to never associate with him again. The next day, upon learning that her best friend was conned by a host, Hotaru goes over to a Host club to deal with the person in question, who turns out to be the very same man she met yesterday! She angrily accuses him of conning her friend and challenges him then and there, however Matsuoka has a few tricks up his sleeve as well. Intrigued by her offensive approach, he invites her to play a gun game called "The Survival Game" where people battle each other using toy guns filled with BB pellets. With Matsuoka stating that if he loses he will apologize and if she loses she will become his slave, the game begins. Although Hotaru believes herself to have a fairly easy time defeating him because she is quick and agile, and the fact that she has a fully loaded gun while he only has one pellet in his gun, she realizes too late that he in fact is a prodigy at the game. After a quick loss, Matsuoka invites Hotaru to join his team "Toy Gun Gun". Unable to refuse due to her loss and the huge debt she now has to pay for property damage, Hotaru joins the team, however, there is a rule "No girls allowed on the team!" How can Hotaru, a female, join the team when everyone believes her to be a boy?!
2	"Didn't I Tell You I Don't Need Friends?"; Transliteration: "Nakama nante Iranai tte Itta yo ne?" (Japanese: 仲間なんていらないって言ったよね?)	July 10, 2015
Tōru Yukimura, an S&M ero-manga artist is introduced as the third member of "Team Toy Gun Gun". Yukimura seems rather displeased with the addition of a new teammate as he believes he doesn't need any other friends beside Matsuoka. Despite this, the team play their first game, a "Capture the Flag" inspired mode, and Yukimura and Hotaru are paired to act as the offense while Matsuoka stays behind to play defense. Although Yukimura states he will cover for Hotaru, he leaves her to fend for herself in the hopes that she will start to hate the game and quit. Hotaru, determined to believe in Yukimura as she fends off the three opposing players, continues to call out his name in concern for his well-being and stands up for him when the enemies begin to talk bad about him. Moved by her words, Yukimura angrily scolds Hotaru for being so gullible, but this time asks her to trust him as he promises to have her back. Matsuoka then shows up to protect both of them with Hotaru dashing forward to press the buzzer, capture the flag, and end the game.
3	"It'll Become Your Greatest Partner"; Transliteration: "Saikō no Pātonā ni Narunda kara yo" (Japanese: 最高の戦友(パートナー)になるんだからよ)	July 17, 2015
With Hotaru's debt paid, there is no need for her to stay with Matsuoka and Yukimura so she leaves the team and continues her normal life, but is surprised with a visit from Yukimura at her school. He tells her that he is just there to deliver a manga book, but in actuality wants her to realize that she has come to love survival games. Upon heading home that day, Hotaru contemplates her decision about leaving the team and notices a mysterious envelope delivered to her mailbox. Realizing that the letter is addressed to Yukimura, she goes to his home to deliver it only to come across his vast collection of survival game equipment. Seeing it all, Hotaru remembers her love for the game, but is surprised by the sudden arrival of Yukimura and Mastuoka. The two welcome her officially to the team much to her delight. She delivers the letter which is actually a special invitation given to a chosen few who have earned the right to be in a special Survival Game tournament called TCG or Top Combat Game. Only the best of the best teams are given the privilege to join this game and "Team Toy Gun Gun" is one of the luck few. On Matsuoka's call, Yukimura goes on to help Hotaru buy her own Survival Game gun, as a commemoration of her joining the team after a small pep talk from her seniors. However, when Yukimura sees a game he really wants to buy, he leaves Hotaru with a few words and runs off on his own leaving Hotaru to go to the store alone. Lost and confused, she meets a seemingly kind stranger who seems very knowledgeable about survival games and guns, and advises her on buying a gun. Realizing just how pricey buying a gun and supplies actually is, Hotaru decides to use the envelope of money Matsuoka gave her earlier just to realize it holds only 1000 yen and a note. Noticing this, the mysterious stranger asks Hotaru if she was left with any instructions and remembers the words Yukimura told her before he ran off. After saying the phrase, the manager of the store takes Hotaru to the back to test her skills with the chosen gun. Meanwhile, outside, Yukimura returns from having left Hotaru alone and runs into the stranger that helped her out, someone he knows all too well, Midori Nagamasa.
4	"He's Not Cut Out for That Tournament"; Transliteration: "Koitsu wa ano taikai ni wa mui tené yo" (Japanese: こいつはあの大会には向いてねぇよ)	July 24, 2015
Yukimura clashes with Midori, as some issues concerning Matsuoka and their past feuds are brought up. Meanwhile, out back, the manager is testing Hotaru with her aiming but she seems to fail every single time. He seems about ready to give up on her when she insists he test her another way. Giving in, the manager decides to play a "Chase and Catch" survival game with her. If she can hit him within 5 minutes then the gun is hers. After endless chasing, the game seems just about over when Hotaru releases her inner bloodlust and makes a surprise leap over the walls. Just about ready to shoot, the manager pulls his weapon in shock and shoots first ending the game. Even though Hotaru loses, the manager is impressed by her potential and gives her the gun. Unaware of the tension in the air, Hotaru and the manager return to the storefront to find Yukimura alone, and the "stranger" gone. With two weeks left till the commencement of the TCG (Top Combat Game) tournament, Team Toy Gun Gun participate in a survival game event "Yellow vs. Red" to get all the practice they need, and for the twin purpose of training Hotaru, a novice at survival games. Things don't turn out as expected for Hotaru, as she dashes into action much too quickly and pays little to no attention to her surroundings or teammates. In consequence, Matsuoka calls her out on her mistakes and Hotaru believes he is speaking too harshly to her, comparing his tone to that of a dictator. Because of this, Hotaru's words cause painful flashbacks for Matsuoka and he angrily declares her unfit as she is right now. He grabs her by the arm and is sent to play on the opponent's team much to her shock.
5	"I Don't Want to Leave This Team!"; Transliteration: "Kono Chīmu o Nuketakunai!" (Japanese: このチームを抜けたくない!)	July 31, 2015
Hotaru is made to join the Red team upon Matsuoka's recommendation after an argument between him and Hotaru ensues. Shocked by the turn of events, Hotaru starts to believe she isn't good enough to stand as Matsuoka's and Yukimura's equal and begins to lament her decision of joining the team. Noticing this, a young woman named Hanako Sagara, leader of the red team in the survival game, asks Hotaru to join her as she helps her witness the true power of Team Toy Gun Gun and take notice of how Matsuoka and Yukimura truly feel about Hotaru. Noticing the love and care Matsuoka has for his teammates and the skilled defense Yukimura has for protecting Matsuoka, Hotaru begins to regret her words from their earlier fight. Realizing that Matsuoka's harsh words were meant to encourage her and help her grow, Hotaru begs an apology after the game, shocking Matsuoka and Yukimura. Feeling guilty as well for his anger, Matsuoka quickly apologizes with the three mending their friendship and promising to become stronger for TCG. Wanting to thank the young woman for her help, Hotaru's happiness is cut short when the woman begins to talk about Team Toy Gun Gun's rule of no females allowed which makes Hotaru question why they have the rule in the first place. The following morning, the three go out for their morning jog, with Matsuoka insisting they play a survival game with water guns to train. Noticing her lack of enthusiasm, Yukimura asks Hotaru why she is feeling so down and she asks in turn why the team won't allow females. As they play, Yukimura explains about an incident in the past where their teammate, an anonymous female, was tormented and "killed" brutally by a rival team in the game causing her to quit. Having watched the whole scene left a scar within Matsuoka which is why he now insists of having no females on the team. Not wanting to lie to them anymore, Hotaru is determined to tell them the truth about her gender, but changes her mind when she realizes she could help them another way: by defeating the team who hurt their old teammate, she can prove herself!
6	"The Storm is Coming"; Transliteration: "Arashi ga, Kuru" (Japanese: 嵐が、来る)	August 7, 2015
A competition is starting soon, Hotaru is surprised by how many are competing in it. While as others plan ahead.
7	"We'll Have to Crush That Hope"; Transliteration: "Sono Kibou, Hayaku Buchikowashite Agenakya ne" (Japanese: その希望、早くブチ壊してあげなきゃね)	August 14, 2015
Hotaru's team is up and everyone is splitting up to their places. Then Hotaru sees Fujimon what will Hotaru do?
8	"What Controls Your Mind Now"; Transliteration: "Ima, Kimi no Kokoro o Shihai Suru Mono" (Japanese: 今，君の心を支配するもの)	August 21, 2015
Round One of the Top Gun Combat competition continues. With Fujimon out of the match, team Toy Gun Gun and duo Midori and Ichi remain. Matsuoka, Yukimura and Tachibana each have a turn fighting Midori. The winner of the first match is determined.
9	"That's What Makes Me Cool!"; Transliteration: "Dakara Watashi wa Kakkoii!" (Japanese: だから私はかっこいいっ!)	August 28, 2015
Hotaru is resting at school, when Kanae wonders why and asked? As Hotaru felt down when the match ended, in a lost. Later Kanae wonders if Hotaru just quits? Then Kanae looks at her phone she knows what is it about, and what Hotaru does in the games she plays in. Later Kanae challenged Hotaru to a small race.
10	"I Want to Fight With These People"; Transliteration: "Kono Hitotachi To Ishoni Tatakaeritai" (Japanese: この人達と一緒に戦いたいっ)	September 4, 2015
Masamune kicks Hotaru out of the team, giving her the reason that she's too weak. In order to prove her worth, Hotaru challenges Nagamasa Midori in a one on one fight.
11	"Let's Do Something Fun"; Transliteration: "Ii Koto, Shimashouka" (Japanese: いいこと、しましょうか)	September 11, 2015
After the challenge, Hotaru runs into Tooru, who informs her about the real truth behind Masamune's actions and the true history of Toy Gun Gun.
12	"I Won't Yield!"; Transliteration: "Kono Basho Wa Yuzuranai!" (Japanese: この場所は譲らないつ！)	September 18, 2015
On knowing the truth from Yukimura concerning the previous Toy Gun Gun members, Hotaru's resilience leads her to challenge Masamune to a duel, on the condition that she'd join the Team if she won even once against him.

== Reception ==
Anime News Network (ANN) had three editors review the first episode of the anime: Theron Martin found interest in the relationship dynamic between Hotaru and Masamune, a potential exploration of gender identity, and gave credit to the show's technical aesthetics despite lacking in palpable comedic moments; Nick Creamer was drawn in by the characterization of Hotaru but found criticism in the direction of both the plot and animation as feeling mediocre and typical of its given genre. The third reviewer, Rebecca Silverman, found the episode to be one of weakest debuts of its given season, criticizing the character of Hotaru and the storytelling she's placed in, and the middling production that's accessory to the delivery. Silverman said that: "If you're really into survival game shows and find mistaken gender hilarious, there might be more here for you than I found, but I'm also sure that there are better versions of both stories to be found elsewhere". Fellow ANN editor Gabriella Ekens reviewed the complete anime series in 2016. She commended the "fairly realistic depiction" of airsoft towards a female demographic and the initial character setup of Hotaru and Midori, but found the series overall unspectacular with its half-hearted delivery of both shōnen-ai and shōjo elements simultaneously, unfinished plot and an "irritating and hyperactive" English dub with only Greg Ayres' portrayal of Midori as the highlight, concluding that: "Although it contains some sparks of promise with a few characters who aren't entirely stereotypes, Aoharu x Machinegun is ultimately my least favorite type of show – boring, incomplete, and made for practically nobody. Skip."

== See also ==
- Tokyo Aliens, another manga series by the same author
