= Keijin Okuda =

Japanese voice actor

Keijin Okuda (奥田啓人, Okuda Keijin; born January 27, 1972) is a Japanese voice actor from Saitama Prefecture affiliated with Mausu Promotion.

== Roles ==
=== Television animation ===
- Bleach (Akon, Jāji-sensei, others)
- Kaze no Stigma (Shinji Yūki)
- Naruto (Zaku Abumi, Zōri, Konoha no Anbu, Shura)
- Naruto Shippuden (Butsuma Senju, Gotta)
- Tide-Line Blue (Mayuge)

=== Video games ===
- Jak II (Jinx)
- Kingdom Hearts Birth by Sleep (Patrol)
- Shinobido: Way of the Ninja (Hebitonbo)
- Ratchet & Clank Future: A Crack in Time (Zoni)
- Sonic the Hedgehog (2006 video game) (GUN soldiers, Soleanna researchers)

=== Dubbing roles ===
==== Live-action ====
- Angel (Charles Gunn (J. August Richards))
- Anonymous Rex (Henchman (Tim Burd))
- Big Momma's House 2 (Oshima (Kevin Durand))
- Cube Zero (Dodd (David Huband))
- Dirty Sexy Money (Simon Elder (Blair Underwood))
- Firewall (Willy (Vincent Gale))
- Impact Point (Matt Cooper (Joe Manganiello))
- Terminator: The Sarah Connor Chronicles (Derek Reese (Brian Austin Green))

==== Animation ====
- Cars (Peterbilt)
- Home Movies (Duane, Andrew Small)
- Pinocchio (Stromboli)
- SpongeBob SquarePants (Mr. Krabs, Mermaid Man (first voice), Barnacle Boy (second voice), Larry the Lobster, Squilliam Fancyson, Black Jack, Stanley SquarePants)

==== Japanese Voice-Over ====
- Peter Pan's Flight (Pirates Dunkan)
