= Corey Hartzog =

American voice actor

Corey Daniel Hartzog is an American voice actor. In anime, he is known as the voice of Tatsumi from the popular Akame ga Kill series, Masamune Matsuoka from Aoharu x Machinegun, Ichiro Sato from the Aura: Koga Maryuin's Last War, Quon Mitsuchi from the Towa no Quon movies, Kanato Sakamaki from the Diabolik Lovers series, Noiz from Dramatical Murder, Sugane Tachibana from the Gatchaman Crowds series, Toshikazu Asagi from Majestic Prince, and Yuya Bridges in Muv-Luv Alternative: Total Eclipse.

== Filmography ==
=== Anime ===
Year	Title	Role	Notes	Source
2010	Xam'd: Lost Memories	Yango		
2011	Angel Beats	Oyama		
2012	Hakuoki series	Chikage Kazama	also season 2, movies	
2013	Hiro no Kakera series	Shinji Inukai	also season 2	
2014	Diabolik Lovers series	Kanato Sakamaki	also season 2	
2014	Gatchaman Crowds series	Sugane Tachibana	also season 2	
2014	Majestic Prince	Toshikazu Asagi		
2014	Rozen Maiden Zuruckspulen	Jun Sakurada (adult)		
2015	Maid Sama	Ryunosuke Kurosaki		
2015	Dramatical Murder	Noiz		
2015	Muv-Luv Alternative: Total Eclipse	Yuya Bridges		
2015	Akame ga Kill	Tatsumi		
2016	My Neighbor Seki	Akiyasu Uzawa		
2016	Aoharu x Machinegun	Masamune Matsuoka		

=== Film ===
Year	Title	Role	Notes	Source
2011	Loups Garous	Ayumi Kono		
2012	Broken Blade series	Girge		
2012	Children who Chase Lost Voices	Shun		
2012	Towa no Quon series	Quon Mitsuchi		
2015	Aura: Koga Maryuin's Last War	Ichiro Sato		
