= Tokyo Aliens =

Japanese manga series

- First tankōbon volume cover

東京エイリアンズ (Tōkyō Eirianzu)
- Genre: Science fantasy
- Manga
- Written by: Naoe
- Published by: Square Enix
- English publisher: NA: Square Enix Manga & Books
- Magazine: Monthly GFantasy
- Original run: April 17, 2020 – present
- Volumes: 13
- icon

Tokyo Aliens (Japanese: 東京エイリアンズ, Hepburn: Tōkyō Eirianzu) is a Japanese manga series written and illustrated by Naoe. It has been serialized in Square Enix's shōnen manga magazine Monthly GFantasy since April 2020.

== Publication ==
Written and illustrated by Naoe, Tokyo Aliens started in Square Enix's shōnen manga magazine Monthly GFantasy on April 17, 2020. Square Enix has collected its chapters into individual tankōbon volumes. The first volume was released on September 26, 2020. As of July 27, 2026, thirteen volumes have been released.

In North America, the manga is licensed for English release by Square Enix Manga & Books.

=== Volumes ===
No.	Original release date	Original ISBN	English release date	English ISBN
1	September 26, 2020	978-4-7575-6865-5	November 8, 2022	978-1-64609-173-7
Episode 0; Chapter 1: "Alien Encounter"; Chapter 2: "Hakugin"; Chapter 3: "Akira Gunji"
2	February 27, 2021	978-4-7575-7118-1	February 14, 2023	978-1-64609-174-4
Chapter 4: "Unknown Alien"; Chapter 5: "The Target"; Chapter 6: "Mulch"; Chapter 7: "Little Sister"; Chapter 8: "Sho Tenkubashi"
3	July 27, 2021	978-4-7575-7391-8	May 9, 2023	978-1-64609-175-1
Chapter 9: "The Value of My Life"; Chapter 10: "I Can't Do It"; Chapter 11: "I'll Protect You"; Chapter 12: "Tenkubashi-kun and Kizaki-kun"
4	January 27, 2022	978-4-7575-7700-8	August 8, 2023	978-1-64609-219-2
Chapter 13: "Confession"; Chapter 14: "I Don't Want to Be Protected"; Chapter 15: "Say "Good Morning""; Chapter 16: "I Loved Him"; Chapter 17: "Earthlings or Aliens"; Chapter 18: "A Mission Without Tenkubashi-kun"
5	July 27, 2022	978-4-7575-7998-9; 978-4-7575-7999-6 (SE)	November 14, 2023	978-1-64609-220-8
Chapter 19: "I'm Sorry"; Chapter 20: "The Real Murderer"; Chapter 21: "A World Without Loved Ones""; Chapter 22: "You're Not My Type"; Chapter 23: "I Don't Want to See Her"
6	January 27, 2023	978-4-7575-8366-5	March 5, 2024	978-1-64609-256-7
Chapter 24: "A Date with a Cute Girl"; Chapter 25: "The Truth"; Chapter 26: "Goodbye, Raika"; Chapter 27: "I'll Kill Ririka"; Chapter 28: "I'm Always on Your Side"
7	July 27, 2023	978-4-7575-8632-1; 978-4-7575-8633-8 (SE)	September 10, 2024	978-1-64609-306-9
Chapter 29: "Blabbermouth Alien"; Chapter 30: "Be Happy"; Chapter 31: "Stupid Me"; Chapter 32: "Reunion"; Chapter 33: "Chizuru"
8	January 26, 2024	978-4-7575-8925-4; 978-4-7575-8924-7 (SE)	April 15, 2025	978-1-64609-372-4
Chapter 34: "Infection"; Chapter 35: "Privilege"; Chapter 36: "Everything at My Disposal"; Chapter 37: "Tenkubashi-kun's Love Life"; Chapter 38: "Black Market Auction"; Special Short Comics
9	July 26, 2024	978-4-7575-9316-9	October 14, 2025	978-1-64609-395-3
Chapter 39: "Amamiya's Messenger"; Chapter 40: "But I Promised"; Chapter 41: "Coin Locker Guy"; Chapter 42: "Mushroom"; Chapter 43: "Cute Baby Mouse"; Chapter 44: "Love"; Chapter 45: "My Hunting Dog"
10	January 27, 2025	978-4-7575-9596-5	April 21, 2026	978-1-64609-466-0
11	July 26, 2025	978-4-7575-9925-3; 978-4-7575-9926-0 (SE)	—	—
12	January 27, 2026	978-4-301-00293-2	—	—
13	July 27, 2026	978-4-3010-0659-6	—	—

== Reception ==
By October 2021, the first three volumes had over 250,000 copies in circulation. By December 2022, the manga had over 1 million copies in circulation. By July 2025, it had over 2.22 million copies in circulation.

== See also ==
- Aoharu × Machinegun, another manga series by the same author
