= Mighty Space Miners =

Japanese OVA series

- Japanese Blu-Ray cover (2023).

おいら宇宙の探鉱夫 (Oira Uchū no Tankōfu)
- Genre: Science fiction
- Created by: Forsman Ranchfield
- Original video animation
- Directed by: Umanosuke Iida
- Produced by: Katsumi Yamaguchi; Masao Mochizuki
- Written by: Ritsuko Hayasaka; Tsutomu Iida
- Music by: Kenji Kawai
- Studio: Triangle Staff
- Licensed by: ADV Films (expired); Discotek Media (out of print)
- Released: November 11, 1994 – January 27, 1995
- Runtime: approx. 30 minutes per episode
- Episodes: 2

Mighty Space Miners (Japanese: おいら宇宙の探鉱夫, Oira Uchū no Tankōfu; lit. I am a space miner) is a Japanese original video animation (OVA) series released between 1994 and 1995. Directed by Umanosuke Iida, with scripts credited to Ritsuko Hayasaka and Tsutomu Iida, and produced by Triangle Staff and KSS, the series was conceived as a hard science fiction survival drama set in a near-future asteroid mining colony. Only two out of six planned episodes were made.

== Plot ==
Set in the 2060s, the story takes place on a mining colony carved into the captured asteroid 4179 Toutatis, positioned near Earth as a space habitat and a base for asteroid miners. The narrative follows 12-year-old Nanbu Ushiwaka (voiced by Kappei Yamaguchi in Japanese and Amanda Winn-Lee in English), the oldest child born in space, as he attempts to pass a practical piloting examination. During an operation to capture Halley's Comet, a derelict military satellite malfunctions and launches a nuclear missile. The resulting explosion triggers failures throughout the habitat, leaving the survivors struggling to cope as authorities delay the rescue attempt.

== Episodes ==
1. Episode 1: 「118,000ミリセコンドの悪夢」 (118,000 Milliseconds of Nightmare) – Released 11 November 1994.
2. Episode 2: 「デストロイ&エクソダス」 (Destroy & Exodus) – Released 27 January 1995.
3. Episode 3: 「大気圏突入」 (Atmospheric Entry) – Unproduced.
4. Episode 4: 「ファシズム」 (Fascism) – Unproduced.
5. Episode 5: 「凶星ハレー」 (Halley, the Star of Bad Fate) – Unproduced.
6. Episode 6: 「トータチス1B9-6」 (Toutatis 1B9-6) – Unproduced.

== Production ==
Mighty Space Miners was directed by Umanosuke Iida, with scripts written by Ritsuko Hayasaka and Tsutomu Iida. Character design and animation direction were handled by Toshihiro Kawamoto, while mechanical designs were created by Isamu Imakake. Music was composed by Kenji Kawai.

Although the story has been credited to a foreign-sounding original author フォースマン・ランチフィールド (rendered in English-language sources as "Forsman Ranchfield" or "Horceman Lunchfield"), the name is a pseudonym of Umanosuke Iida, and the OVA is not an adaptation of any prior work.

The OVA was planned as a six-episode series but was cancelled after the release of its first two episodes.

== Release ==
Mighty Space Miners was released in Japan on VHS and LaserDisc between November 1994 and January 1995. A North American English-dubbed edition was released by A.D. Vision in 1995, with both episodes dubbed and issued on a single VHS tape; in 2013 the series was licensed by Discotek and saw a DVD release in 2014. The series was released in Japan as part of KSS's "Super High Quality" video animation line. A Japanese Blu-ray edition was released in 2023 and included liner notes outlining the originally planned conclusion of the cancelled series.

== Reception ==
Although left incomplete, Mighty Space Miners has been praised by critics for its storytelling, animation, as well as grounded portrayal of a space disaster and survival scenario. Particular attention has been paid to its plausible world-building and restrained tone, which balances youthful optimism with sustained peril. However, the unresolved cliffhanger ending—leaving the ultimate fate of the colony unknown—has, expectedly, been a source of frustration among viewers.

Helen McCarthy in 1996 described the series as a "gripping: hard-science adventure... based on the most up-to-date research on real conditions in space" while The Complete Anime Guide: Japanese Animation Video (1997) called it "hard sci-fi... with a softer anime edge".

Ryusuke Hikawa situates the work in a tradition of "juvenile SF" and highlights its emphasis on the harshness of space as a vacuum environment where small mistakes can lead directly to death, while also praising the construction of the visuals—particularly the depiction of light and the representation of inertia in weightlessness.
