= Umanosuke Iida =

Japanese anime director (1961–2010)

- 飯田 馬之介
- Born: Tsutomu Iida (飯田 勉, Iida Tsutomu); April 30, 1961; Hokkaido, Japan
- Died: November 26, 2010 (aged 49); Tokyo, Japan

Umanosuke Iida (飯田 馬之介, Iida Umanosuke; April 30, 1961 – November 26, 2010) (also known as Tsutomu Iida) was a Japanese anime creator, director and screenwriter. Iida died due to lung cancer.

Iida was born in Urakawa, Hokkaido and graduated from Hokkaido Urakawa High School. He was a member of the Japan Animation Creators Association (JAniCA).

He died of lung cancer at a hospital in Kiyose, Tokyo on November 26, 2010, at the age of 49. At the farewell ceremony, Hayao Miyazaki read a eulogy. He passed during production of the anime Towa no Quon, which he had been set to direct. After his death, production was taken over by Takeshi Mori, who was credited as co-director.

== Filmography ==
- Nausicaä of the Valley of the Wind (1984) – In-between animation
- Lupin III Part III (1984–1985) – Key animation (Oh! Production) (5 eps.)
- Legend of the Gold of Babylon (1985) – Key animation
- Castle in the Sky (1986) – Assistant director
- Devilman: Tanjou Hen (1987) – Director, screenwriter
- Devilman: Yocho Sirène Hen (1990) – Director, screenwriter
- CB Chara Nagai Go World (1991) – Director, storyboard
- Gin Rei (1994) – Storyboard (ep. 2)
- Mighty Space Miners (1994–1995) – Director
- Mobile Suit Gundam: The 08th MS Team (1996–1999) – Director (eps. 7–12), storyboard (eps. 6–11), unit director (ep. 6), key animation (ep. 11)
- Mobile Suit Gundam: The 08th MS Team: Miller's Report (1998) – Director, storyboard (Gonzo), animation director
- Blue Submarine No.6 (1998–2000) – Planning cooperation
- Cowboy Bebop (1998–1999) – Storyboard (ep. 19)
- The Big O (1999–2000) – Storyboard (eps. 4, 11)
- Vandread (2000) – Planning association
- The King of Braves GaoGaiGar Final (2000–2003) – Storyboard (ep. 2)
- Hellsing (2001–2002) – Director, storyboard (eps. 12–13)
- Vandread the Second Stage (2002) – Planning cooperation
- Yukikaze (2002–2005) – Planning association
- The King of Braves GaoGaiGar Final -Grand Glorious Gathering- (2005) – Storyboard
- Tide-Line Blue (2005) – Director, storyboard (eps. 1, 6, 12), original creator
- Origin: Spirits of the Past (2006) – Storyboard, concept
- Mobile Suit Gundam: The 08th MS Team U.C.0079+α (manga) (2007–2011) – Story, art
- Blassreiter (2008) – Storyboard (eps. 6, 14)
- Birdy the Mighty: Decode (2008) – Storyboard (ep. 5)
- Shangri-La (2009) – Storyboard (ep. 6), design
- Towa no Quon (2011) – Director, planning
