= Tide-Line Blue =

Japanese anime series

- Tide-Line Blue Promotional Poster

タイドライン·ブルー (Taidorain Burū)
- Genre: Action, Adventure, Comedy, Drama
- Created by: Satoru Ozawa; Umanosuke Iida; Bandai Visual
- Anime television series
- Directed by: Umanosuke Iida
- Produced by: Kiyoshi Sugiyama; Satoru Shimizu
- Written by: Yuka Yamada
- Music by: Tsuneyoshi Saito
- Studio: Telecom Animation Film
- Licensed by: NA: Bandai Entertainment
- Original network: TV Asahi, ABC
- Original run: 6 July 2005 – 29 September 2005
- Episodes: 13
- icon

Tide-Line Blue (タイドライン·ブルー, Taidorain Burū) is a Japanese anime series created by Satoru Ozawa and Umanosuke Iida. The series was produced by Bandai Visual and animated by Telecom Animation Film.

== Background ==
Tide-Line Blue is set after an environmental disaster later called the "Hammer of Eden" has submerged 90% of the Earth under water and taken six billion lives. The series begins fourteen years after that event with the new and remaining countries being brought together under the New United Nations. However, Gould, a renegade submarine captain wishes to use military force to create peace in the new world order, while Aoi, the secretary-general of the New UN, wishes to use diplomacy, and a boy named Keel finds himself caught up in the middle of it all.

== Characters ==
Keel (キール, Kīru)
Voiced by: Daisuke Sakaguchi (Japanese); Andrew Jenkins (English)
A carefree 14-year-old boy living in the city of Yabitsu. He was orphaned at an early age and was taken in by New United Nations Secretary-General Aoi. He has feelings for Isla, but is unable to express them to her. Despite his happy-go-lucky attitude, he took care of Isle in the aftermath of the attack on Yabitsu and ended up boarding the Ulysses in order to obtain treatment for Isla.
Tean Gould (ティーン・グールド, Tīn Gūrudo)
Voiced by: Daisuke Namikawa (Japanese); Cole Howard (English)
A 14-year-old boy and twin brother of Keel, who serves as a lieutenant on the Ulysses. He was brought up as a soldier after Gould rescued him as a child. He was chosen to convey Gould's declaration of war to the new UN. The twins were temporarily reunited in the confusion after the attack, when Tean delivered Isla's baby. He advised Keel to leave Yabitsu and gave him an insignia to identify him should he wish to leave Yabitsu on the Ulysses. He was captured by new UN forces before he could return to the Ulysses.
Isla (イスラ, Isura)
Voiced by: Rika Wakusawa (Japanese); Jayna Mitchell (English)
A 16-year-old jewelry crafter who makes her living by selling her handmade silver trinkets to sailors who stop in Yabitsu. She is single mother who became pregnant at a young age. A strong and lively girl, she doesn't let the situation get her down, no matter how bad it may seem. She becomes a very popular person on board the Ulysses in part because she is always willing to undertake any chores that need doing.
Eyebrows (マユゲ, Mayuge)
Voiced by: Keijin Okuda (Japanese); Cole Howard (English)
An ostrich, able to understand human speech, to whom Keel and Teen have become emotionally attached. Aoi and Eyebrows do not like each other.
Aoi (アオイ, Aoi)
Voiced by: Yoshiko Sakakibara (Japanese); Elinor Holt (English)
New UN Secretary-General and Keel's adoptive mother. She is an excellent politician and administrator but does not know how to deal with her teenaged son. She is trying to reestablish a world government for the benefit of everyone in the aftermath of the "Hammer of Eden" but is hampered by power struggles between the prospective members.
Captain Gould (グールド, Gūrudo)
Voiced by: Takaya Hashi (Japanese); Steve Olson (English)
A captain in the former U.S. Navy, he is the commander the Ulysses, a strategic nuclear submarine. He was seriously injured and received burns to the right half of his face in an attack at a peace ceremony between the new UN and a previously hostile nation. He hated the war and agreed with the ideals set forth in the peace accord but was disillusioned when he lost all of his men in the attack on the signing ceremony. He now considers peace by diplomacy a lost cause and is determined to bring peace to the world in a different way - through his overwhelming military might. To that end he has broken away from Aoi and the new UN and has declared war against the rest of the world.
Josie Egenolph (ジョゼ, Joze)
Voiced by: Kyōko Hikami (Japanese); Carol-Anne Day (English)
A deputy officer on the Ulysses. She is a quiet and beautiful 19-year-old woman, with a firm belief in Gould. She excels at being a soldier and Keel becomes flustered in her presence.
Kazuma Satoyama (里山一馬, Satoyama Kazuma)
Voiced by: Etsuo Yokobori (Japanese); Jim Sarantis (English)
Captain of the Teshio, a Maritime Self-Defense Force Aegis destroyer and new UN flagship. He, along with Aoi and Gould, was confident that the establishment of the new United Nations would benefit mankind. Gould's actions have caused a severe strain on Satoyama's relationship with him.
Blantyre "Blanc" (ブランタイル, Burantairu)
Voiced by: Junpei Morita (Japanese); Paul Huson (English)
The captain of the Electra, a beached nuclear-powered aircraft carrier that was the main base of operations for the establishment of new UN and Yabitsu town. The ship and town were destroyed when the Ulysses attacked.
Deputy Teshio (てしお副長, Teshio-fuku)
Voiced by: Tatsuhisa Suzuki (Japanese); Johnathan Love (English)
The assistant of woodlands.
Klang (クラン, Kuran)
Voiced by: Yuichi Ishigami (Japanese); Tommy James (English)
A former student of Gould's and captain of the stealth cruiser, Gotland, which is sunk in a confrontation with the Ulysses.
Sang (サンジュン, Sanjun)
Voiced by: Shinya Fukumatsu (Japanese); Lucas Gilbertson (English)
The Deputy Secretary-General of the new UN. He has served as Aoi's assistant Aoi and manages the holotank map room.
Ken Liu (劉虔, Ken Liu)
Voiced by: Mitsuaki Hoshino (Japanese); Brendan Hunter (English)
President of the Republic of Wei, which is opposed to the philosophy of the new United Nations. He and the country place their interests before those of the General Assembly.
King (キング, Kingu)
Voiced by: Naomi Kusumi (Japanese); Tommy James (English)
An American oil tycoon and partner in Aoi's plans.
Chenreshi (チェンレーシ, Chenrēshi)
Voiced by: Yōko Honna (Japanese); Jayna Mitchell (English)
The young Pope in Tibet. Aoi asked her to cooperate in building a new world order.
Captain (船長, Senchō)
Voiced by: Katsuhisa Hōki (Japanese); Roger Rhodes (English)
Captain of a floating dock who makes a living by repairing ships. Although he has a rugged exterior, he is an honest person who always keeps his promises. He undertake the repairs to the Ulysses and loses wagers when gambling with Keel.
Angie (アンジー, Anjī)
Voiced by: Akiko Koike (Japanese); Elinor Holt (English)
A girl who helped Keel cheat at gambling. After the Ulysses attacked Yabitsu she took refuge in Tibet.
Sunshine (サンシャイン, Sanshain)
Voiced by: Jun Osuka (Japanese); Cole Howard (English)
A boy who helped Keel cheat at gambling. He was killed in the confusion that resulted from the Ulysses' attack on the Electra and Yabitsu.
Lil' Keel (キール, Kīru)
Isla's newborn child. She named the boy after Keel, who tried to help with the birth. In truth it was Tean who helped deliver the baby.
Emma (エマ, Ema)
Voiced by: Keiko Sonoda (Japanese); Elinor Holt (English)
Tean and Keel's mother. She died in an accident on returning to Earth from space with the boys.
KC
Voiced by: Mitsuru Ogata (Japanese); Roger Rhodes (English)
Tean and Keel's father. He was stationed at Space Station "Freedom", with his wife and children, to map the rapidly changing terrain. The family escaped to Earth and he stayed behind on the station.

== Depictions of technology ==
This series is known for being relatively realistic in its use of technology and the technical accuracy of its animation.

- Ulysees: Evidently named after Ulysses. A siamese submarine commanded by Gould, formerly of the US Navy. It is actually two submarines combined: a nuclear ballistic missile submarine (SSBN), with a nuclear attack submarine (SSN) connected below. It is reportedly 27,777-tons, 202 m length, 18.4 m width, and 31.1 m height. It uses submarine-launched ballistic missiles (SLBM), cruise missiles (SLCM), torpedoes, and anti-ship missiles such as the UGM-84 Harpoon. It also has crewed submersibles which are kept in the nuclear attack submarine section.
- Teshio: A 160-meter, 5050-ton Aegis-equipped escort ship, formerly of the Japan Maritime Self-Defense Force and now the New UN's flagship. Uses the ASROC anti-submarine missile system, an anti-ship missile called SSM-1B, a missile called SM-3, and surface-to-air missiles (SAM). It also has a helicopter deck.
- Han: A nuclear attack submarine from the country of Gui (formerly China) that has a stealth propulsion mode, and unguided supercavitation torpedoes. It is 11,050-tons, 120 m length, 25.3 m width, and 21.2 m in height.
- Gotland: A 155-meter, 12,032-ton stealth cruiser, formerly of the Swedish Navy (visually resembles the real Visby class corvette, and named after the Gotland class submarines). Uses a Vertical Launching System (VLS), Close-in weapon system (CIWS), anti-ship missiles and a cannon. It also has a helicopter deck. There are similar ships in the New UN fleet, called Silurian-class, which do not have the camouflage paint used on the Gotland.
- Narushio: A diesel-electric submarine, formerly of the Japan Maritime Self-Defense Force.
- Freedom: A crewed space station orbiting Earth. Originally a private venture, it was intended to search for coal deposits. After the Hammer of Eden it was used to map the new surface of the Earth, as well as underwater terrain and new ocean currents.

== Episodes ==
No.	Title	Original release date
1	"Spirit" "Fujōsuru Bōrei—Spirit" (浮上する亡霊 — Spirit)	July 6, 2005
2	"Traitor" "Uragirimono—Traitor" (裏切者 — Traitor)	July 13, 2005
3	"Dhola Vira" "DūraBīra—DholaVira" (ドゥーラビィーラ — DholaVira)	July 20, 2005
4	"Share" "Yakuwari—Share" (役割り — Share)	July 27, 2005
5	"Attack" "Kōgeki—Offense" (攻撃 — Offense)	August 3, 2005
6	"K2" "K2—K2" (K2 — K2)	August 10, 2005
7	"Praying" "Inori no Machi—Praying" (祈りの都市(まち) — Praying)	August 31, 2005
8	"Reunite" "Saikai—Reunite" (再会 — Reunite)	September 7, 2005
9	"The Globe" "Atarashii Chizu—the Globe" (新しい地図 — the Globe)	September 14, 2005
10	"Separation" "Wakare—Separation" (別れ — Separation)	September 21, 2005
11	"Battle of Metasequoia" "Metasekoia Kaisen—Battle of Metasequoia" (メタセコイア海戦 — Battle of Metasequoia)	September 28, 2005
12	"Blue" "Burū—Blue" (ブルー — Blue)	October 5, 2005
13	"Brother" "Kyōdai—Brother" (兄弟 — Brother)	N/A
Note: Released as an OVA; DVD only

== Songs ==
Opening Theme:

1. "BLUE TREASURE" Performed by: Minami Kuribayashi

Composed and Arranged by:	Iizuka Maasaki
Lyrics by:	Minami Kuribayashi

Ending Theme:

- 'VOICE" Performed by: Tatsuhisa Suzuki

Composed and Arranged by:	R・O・N
Lyrics by:	Tatsuhisa Suzuki

== Availability ==
Tide-Line Blue was published on DVD in North America by Bandai Entertainment and dubbed into English by Blue Water Studios.
