= Mobile Suit Gundam MS IGLOO =

Japanese OVA series

- Blu-ray cover of the first volume of Mobile Suit Gundam MS IGLOO: The Hidden One Year War

機動戦士ガンダム MS IGLOO (Kidō Senshi Gandamu Emuesu Igurū)
- Genre: Military science fiction Mecha
- Created by: Hajime Yatate; Yoshiyuki Tomino
- Original video animation

MS IGLOO: The Hidden One Year War
- Directed by: Takashi Imanishi
- Written by: Asahide Ōkuma; Hiroshi Ōnogi
- Studio: Sunrise D.I.D.
- Licensed by: NA: Sunrise
- Released: July 19, 2004 – November 3, 2004
- Episodes: 3
- Original video animation

MS IGLOO: Apocalypse 0079
- Directed by: Takashi Imanishi
- Written by: Asahide Ōkuma; Hiroshi Ōnogi
- Studio: Sunrise D.I.D.
- Licensed by: NA: Sunrise
- Released: April 26, 2006 – August 25, 2006
- Episodes: 3
- Original video animation

MS IGLOO 2: Gravity Front
- Directed by: Takashi Imanishi
- Written by: Asahide Ōkuma; Hiroshi Ōnogi
- Studio: Sunrise D.I.D.
- Licensed by: NA: Sunrise
- Released: October 24, 2008 – April 24, 2009
- Episodes: 3
- Related works
- Mobile Suit Gundam

Mobile Suit Gundam MS IGLOO (機動戦士ガンダム MSイグルー, Kidō Senshi Gandamu Emuesu Igurū) is a Japanese mini-series of nine CGI short films and OVAs based on the Gundam anime franchise, released from 2004 to 2009 in three chapters each comprising three episodes. Directed by Takashi Imanishi (who previously directed Gundam 0083) and with Yutaka Izubuchi as production supervisor, the series' storyline takes place during the One Year War of the original Universal Century timeline.

The first two chapters Mobile Suit Gundam MS IGLOO: The Hidden One Year War (機動戦士ガンダム MSイグルー -1年戦争秘話-) and Mobile Suit Gundam MS IGLOO: Apocalypse 0079 (機動戦士ガンダム MSイグルー -黙示録 0079-), released in 2004 and 2006 respectively, are shown from the Principality of Zeon's point of view; while the third chapter Mobile Suit Gundam MS IGLOO 2: Gravity Front (機動戦士ガンダム MSイグルー2 -重力戦線-), released from 2008 to 2009, explores the Earth-based phase of the One Year War from the Earth Federation's point of view.

== Overview ==
=== Mobile Suit Gundam MS IGLOO ===
Taking place at roughly the same time as the original Mobile Suit Gundam, MS IGLOO follows the exploits of the Principality of Zeon's 603rd Technical Evaluation Unit, a special crew of weapons development researchers. Stationed aboard the former civilian cargo ship Jotunheim (named after the land of the giants in Norse mythology), the unit field-tests various prototype weapons for combat use under the supervision of Engineer Lieutenant Oliver May. IGLOO's six episodes chronicle the 603rd's adventures at pivotal episodes throughout the One-Year War.

=== Mobile Suit Gundam MS IGLOO 2: Gravity Front ===
Mobile Suit Gundam MS IGLOO 2: Gravity Front (機動戦士ガンダム MS IGLOO 2 重力戦線, Kidō Senshi Gandamu MS IGLOO 2 Juuryoku-sensen) was announced on March 25, 2008. The series consist of three 30-minute episodes and is set on Earth and from Earth Federation's point of view. The 3D CGI is in high definition, higher in quality than what was seen in the previous productions. The production staff is largely unchanged, though the mecha designers behind the design works in this series are Yutaka Izubuchi, Kimitoshi Yamane, Takuhito Kusanagi, Shinji Aramaki and Fumihiro Katagai. The super high-detail designs appeared in the U.C. Hardgraph line were used as is in the animation.

The 1st episode "Shoot at that Death!" was released on October 24, 2008. The 2nd episode "King of the Land, Forward!" was released on January 23, 2009. The 3rd episode "Odessa, Iron Storm!" was released on April 24, 2009.

=== Theme music ===
Sora no Tamoto (時空(そら)のたもと; lit. The Origin of Space-Time) by Taja
Theme song to The Hidden One Year War (1年戦争秘録).
Yume Wadachi (夢轍〜ユメワダチ〜; lit. Tracks of Dream) by Taja
Theme song to Apocalypse 0079 (黙示録0079).
Mr. Lonely Heart by Haruna Yokota
Theme song to Gravity Front Ep 1 Shoot at that Death! (重力戦線第1話：あの死神を撃て!)
Places in the Heart by Shinji Kakijima
Theme song to Gravity Front Ep 2 King of the Land, Forward! (重力戦線第2話：陸の王者、前へ!)
No Limit∞ by Taja
Theme song to Gravity Front Ep 3 Odessa, Iron Storm! (重力戦線第3話：オデッサ、鉄の嵐!)

== Cast ==
=== The Hidden One Year War & Apocalypse 0079 ===
- Oliver May — Hideo Ishikawa
- Monique Cadillac — Miki Nagasawa
- Martin Prochnow — Shōzō Iizuka
- Albert Schacht — Tamio Ōki
- Domenico Marquez — Katsuya Shiga
- Erich Kruger — Hiroshi Matsumoto
- Hideo Washiya — Jun Fukuyama
- Jean Xavier — Mikako Takahashi
- Aleksandro Hemme — Katsuhisa Hōki
- Demeziere Sonnen — Masuo Amada
- Jean Luc Duvall — Takaya Hashi
- Werner Holbein — Ken'yū Horiuchi
- Erwin Cadillac - Sayaka Aida
- Herbert von Kuspen - Ikuya Sawaki
- Gihren Zabi — Banjō Ginga
- Federico Czariano — Jōji Nakata

=== Gravity Front ===
- Ben Barberry — Masaki Terasoma
- Papa Sidney Lewis — Nobuyuki Hiyama
- Michael Colmatta — Hiroki Tōchi
- Harman Yandell — Tsutomu Isobe
- Rayban Surat — Katsuyuki Konishi
- Arleen Nazon — Kikuko Inoue
- Clyde Bettany — Kōji Yusa
- Milos Karppi — Taiten Kusunoki
- Doroba Kuzwayo — Kentarō Itō
- Death deity — Kikuko Inoue
- Kycilia Zabi — Mami Koyama
- Elmer Snell — Akio Ōtsuka

== Episodes ==
=== The Hidden One Year War ===
No.	Title	Original release date
1	"The Vanishing Serpent of Loum"; Transliteration: "Orochi wa Rūmu ni Kieta" (Japanese: 大蛇はルウムに消えた)	July 19, 2004
With the outbreak of the One Year War, the Principality of Zeon forms the 603rd Technical Evaluation Unit, a team of soldiers, technicians, and engineering specialists in charge of assessing various prototype weapons aboard the Jotunheim, a civilian cargo ship refitted and enlisted for military use. Their first assignment is to test the Jormungand, a powerful long-range plasma cannon capable of taking out a battleship in a single shot. However, the weapon's maiden appearance at the Battle of Loum becomes its last, as a new member of the Zeon arsenal soon arrives to prove the Jormungand obsolete. As the Zeon force decimates the Federation armada, Chief Gunnery Officer Lt. Aleksandro Hemme uses the Jormungand to take down a Federation Magellan-class warship, but dies in the process.
2	"Howls Stained in Dusk"; Transliteration: "Tōboe wa Rakujitsu ni Somatta" (Japanese: 遠吠えは落日に染まった)	July 19, 2004
As the Earth Drop Operation begins, the 603rd is assigned to test the YMT-05 Hildolfr, a massive transformable mobile tank. The task falls onto Maj. Demeziere Sonnen, a respected armored warfare instructor who is now disgraced and troubled by drug addiction from his own misery, after Zeon abandoned armored vehicles in favor of mobile suits. When the team drops into Arizona for field tests, they find the supply depot in their assigned drop zone destroyed — by a Federation assault team using captured MS-06J Zaku IIs. After using the element of surprise to destroy two enemy Zakus, Sonnen is forced to bring the uncalibrated Hildolfr into open battle against the remaining 5 Zakus. The fast and powerful mobile tank proves its mettle by taking out all enemies, but not without the cost of Sonnen's life.
3	"Dance of the Orbital Ghosts"; Transliteration: "Kidō-jō ni Gen'ei wa Hayaru" (Japanese: 軌道上に幻影は疾る)	November 3, 2004
Upon news of a powerful new Federation mobile suit, Zeon propagandizes the EMS-10 Zudah mobile suit as superior to the Federation prototype. The 603rd is put in charge of testing three prototypes with the help of Zimmad Company test pilot Maj. Jean-Luc Duvall. However, the testing soon goes wrong after one of the Zudahs flies out of control and disintegrates during a combat simulation against a Musai warship, killing its pilot. The weapon test is then grounded indefinitely. To add insult to injury, the Jotunheim crew is shocked to learn that the Federation already knows the Zudah's shameful background — it is a revival of the EMS-04, a failed bidder (losing to the MS-05 Zaku I) for Zeon's first combat mobile suit project due to a lethal design flaw. As the Jotunheim responds to the distress call of Zeon forces seeking rescue in Earth orbit after retreating from Odessa, the disgraced Duvall sorties in his Zudah to engage the incoming Federation forces to prove its worth (and also his) one last time.

=== Apocalypse 0079 ===
No.	Title	Original release date
1	"In the Skies of Jaburo, I Saw the Sea"; Transliteration: "Jaburō Jōkū ni Unabara o Mita" (Japanese: ジャブロー上空に海原を見た)	April 26, 2006
With Zeon losing their foothold on Earth, the 603rd is given a new project — to infiltrate a prototype weapon into Federation airspace and attack Federation warships launching from Jaburo. Ensign Werner Holbein, an arrogant naval officer who boasts a proud maritime family tradition, is assigned to the Jotunheim to pilot the mobile diver unit Ze'Gok. However, the testing goes well below expectation, as Holbein's two test drops end in failure after unable to score any hit with the Ze'Gok. On the third and final drop, Holbein attempts a direct reentry/free descent and fires his attached "Kuhblume" beam scatter cannon at five Federation ships that just launched. All five ships are destroyed. Before Holbein could celebrate, two Core Booster II fighters arrive and shoot down both the Ze'Gok and the retrieving Gaw carrier, killing him in the process.
2	"Cross the Path of Light"; Transliteration: "Kōbō no Tōge o Koero" (Japanese: 光芒の峠を越えろ)	June 23, 2006
The situation for Zeon is getting desperate after the Federation successfully launches Operation Cembalo - the assault on the space asteroid fortress Solomon. Upon arriving at A Baoa Qu, the Jotunheim is visited by Col. Herbert von Kuspen, an uptight high-rank commander from an elite battalion, who immediately tries to assume command of the ship but meets resistance from both Monique and Prochnow. He brings along a squad of Oggo mobile pods and their pilots he claims are the "Principality's elite soldiers" — who are actually young cadets forcefully mobilized from the homeland. To Monique's shock, the most enthusiastic of the recruits is actually her younger brother Erwin. The Jotunheim is then dispatched to lunar space and ordered to test and perfect the Oggos. At Granada airspace they run into Federation forces and Erwin leads a squad of three Oggos into battle. After fierce fighting, it all ends up with only Erwin and a Ball pilot remaining, both have their weapons malfunctioned. Though he manages to convinces the Federation pilot to surrender, they die from a stray shot fired by a Federation Salamis cruiser that arrived on the scene. Monique breaks down at her brother's death and Oliver is shocked to spot a weird new weapon on radar.
3	"Spirits Returning to the Cries of Thunder"; Transliteration: "Raimei ni Tamashī wa Kaeru" (Japanese: 雷鳴に魂は還る)	August 25, 2006
Just as Gihren Zabi proudly announces to his troops the decimation of the Federation fleet by the Solar Ray, the 603rd receives its latest prototype weapon — the massive Big-Rang mobile armor. When the Federation launches a two-pronged pincer attack on A Baoa Qu, the Kuspen Combat Battalion is assigned to defend the E field, and Oliver is ordered to man the Big-Rang despite a lack of piloting experience. When the Jotunheim encounters a vanguard detachment of the Federation fleet, Oliver manages to inflict heavy casualties on the Federation forces with the help of Monique and Kuspen. Although the Big-Rang pushes back the first wave, the swarm of Federation GMs eventually overwhelm and destroy the mobile armor, as well as killing Kuspen. As the retreating Jotunheim mourns the loss of their friends, a small group of survivor mobile suits approaches, among them an alive Oliver held by Monique's heavily damaged Zudah.

=== Gravity Front ===
No.	Title	Original release date
1	"Shoot at that Death!"; Transliteration: "Ano Shinigami o Ute!" (Japanese: あの死神を撃て!)	October 24, 2008
The Federation forces are routed in face of the onslaught of the Zeon Zakus during the Earth Drop Operations. When the main forces are retreating for resupply, anti-mobile suit tactical squad commander Lt. Ben Barberry is ordered by his arrogant superior, Col. Michael Colmatta, to advance and ambush the pursuing Zeon forces. Unknown to others, Barberry, who loses every subordinate in previous engagements, is frequently haunted by a spirit called Shinigami, who patrols the battlefield collecting souls of fallen warriors. Barberry and his platoon arrive at the outskirts of a ruined mining town and receives information of two Zakus (instead of three from the intelligence report) rampaging through a nearby supply depot. The ambush is set but fails to achieve an immediate kill when one of the squads fires their Regina missile too early. Despite eventually destroying the first target, the second Zaku soon dashes in for backup and kills everyone except Barberry. Enraged, Barberry attempts to make a last stand and manages to score a direct hit when the Zaku accidentally falls into a pothole. Thinking he's the sole survivor again, Barberry is shocked to see a third Zaku rising up from a camouflaged underground hiding. Knowing that his fate is sealed, Barberry empties his service pistol at the incoming Giant of Death.
2	"King of the Land, Forward!"; Transliteration: "Riku no Ōja, Mae e!" (Japanese: 陸の王者、前へ!)	January 23, 2009
Sgt. Rayban Surat is transferred to the 1st Platoon, 301st Tank Squadron of the Federation's 44th Hybrid Regiment as a driver for Lt. Harmon Yandell, a seasoned tank ace. However, Yandell is a man with his own demon — he survived an encounter with Zeon's feared "White Ogre" Cpt. Elmer Snell at the cost of his left leg, and sees himself as a homeless dead man walking. His previous drivers have either been killed, or gone insane seeing the Death Deity haunting Yandell's back. After seeing Yandell's irrational behavior, Surat asked his commanding superior, Col. Colmatta, to relieve Yandell's command. Instead of doing so, Colmatta approved Yandell's mad plan to launch a night assault on the oncoming Zeon force, which Snell leads. Yandell's squadron of eight tanks ambushes Snell's Zaku tri-squad at a plain where the Federation suffered a major defeat the previous day. Using the residual heat of tank wreckage as cover, the Type 61s fight a very disadvantaged battle and destroy two Zakus. Eventually only Yandell's tank and Snell's Zaku remain, and one bazooka shot from Snell appears to have stopped the tank. However, it turns out that Yandell was in a ninth tank and surprises Snell from behind, killing him. Yandell hails his apparent joy over killing his nemesis, only to be killed when a Zeon patrol sneaks up and fires a rocket at his tank. Surat jumps into a nearby pit and survives the battle.
3	"Odessa, Iron Storm!"; Transliteration: "Odessa, Tetsu no Arashi!" (Japanese: オデッサ、鉄の嵐！)	April 24, 2009
Though Operation Odessa is proceeding, the 44th Hybrid Brigade suffers setbacks after its advance is bombarded by artillery fire from Zeon's Dabude-class land battleships. They are reinforced by three RTX-440 Guntanks (advanced versions of the RX-75 Guntank seen in the original series) piloted by a trio of convicts led by Lt. Arleen Nazon, a technical officer blamed and condemned to rot in jail after her lover, Clyde Bettany, defected to Zeon with information on the RTX-440. Arleen vows revenge for destroying her future. The offensive resumes on the second day but the Zeon defenses hold against the Federation. Arleen's team penetrates enemy lines to provide artillery reconnaissance before storming and breaking into the Zeon forward base. In the midst of battle, Arleen's two teammates self-detonate their Guntanks, taking out one Dabude. The Federation forces again come under what appears to be friendly fire, but Arleen soon discovers that the gunfire came from a second Dabude. Refusing to obey Colmatta's order to ignore the target, Arleen charges at the enemy, suffering heavy damage from Zeon mobile suits defending the Dabude before crashing right in front of it. The giant landship stops in its tracks, and Bettany tries to convince Arleen over the radio to stop fighting. Overcome by her desire for revenge, Arleen activates the self-destruct system and destroys the Dabude. Shortly afterwards, Arleen's soul awakes from the explosion, only to be informed by the Death Deity that Bettany is in fact a Federal double agent, who infiltrated Zeon command to secure the capture of a Dabude.

== Reception ==
Carl Kimlinger of Anime News Network gave the series a C praising the plot and CG graphics.

Preceded by Superior Defender Gundam Force	Gundam metaseries (production order); 2004–2009	Succeeded by Mobile Suit Gundam SEED Destiny
Preceded by Mobile Suit Gundam: The Origin	Gundam Universal Century timeline U.C. 0079	Succeeded by Mobile Suit Gundam
