= Mobile Suit Gundam: The 08th MS Team =

Japanese OVA series

- Cover of the Blu-ray re-release of Miller's Report (limited edition)

機動戦士ガンダム 第08MS小隊 (Kidō Senshi Gandamu Dai Zerohachi Emu Esu Shōtai)
- Genre: Military science fiction; Drama; Hard science fiction
- Created by: Hajime Yatate; Yoshiyuki Tomino
- Original video animation
- Directed by: Takeyuki Kanda (ep. 1–6); Umanosuke Iida (ep. 7–12)
- Written by: Akira Okeya (ep. 1–6); Hiroaki Kitajima (ep. 7–12)
- Music by: Kohei Tanaka
- Studio: Sunrise
- Licensed by: AUS: Madman Entertainment; NA: Sunrise
- Released: January 25, 1996 – July 25, 1999
- Runtime: 25 minutes
- Episodes: 12
- Anime film

The 08th MS Team: Miller's Report
- Directed by: Mitsuko Kase, Takeyuki Kanda, Umanosuke Iida
- Music by: Kohei Tanaka
- Studio: Sunrise
- Licensed by: NA: Sunrise
- Released: August 1, 1998
- Runtime: 51 minutes
- Light novel

The 08th MS Team Side Story: Trivial Operation
- Written by: Ichirou Ookouchi
- Illustrated by: Kouji Sugiura
- Published by: Kadokawa Shoten
- Magazine: Kadokawa Sneaker Bunko
- Original run: January 1999 – July 2001
- Volumes: 3
- Manga

Mobile Suit Gundam: The 08th MS Team U.C.0079+α
- Written by: Umanosuke Iida
- Published by: Kadokawa Shoten
- Magazine: Gundam Ace
- Original run: March 2007 – June 2011
- Volumes: 4
- Original video animation

The 08th MS Team: Battle in Three Dimensions
- Directed by: Shinya Watada
- Written by: Ichiro Okouchi
- Music by: Kohei Tanaka
- Studio: Sunrise
- Licensed by: NA: Sunrise
- Released: February 22, 2013
- Runtime: 9 minutes
- icon

Mobile Suit Gundam: The 08th MS Team (Japanese: 機動戦士ガンダム 第08MS小隊, Hepburn: Kidō Senshi Gandamu Dai Zerohachi Emu Esu Shōtai; lit. Mobile Suit Gundam: The 08th MS Platoon) is an original video animation (OVA) anime series in the Gundam franchise. Released from January 25, 1996, to July 25, 1999, the 12-episode series details the exploits of an Earth Federation ground unit during the One Year War—specifically a month after the beginning of the original 1979 Gundam series and into the final weeks of the war.

== Plot ==
The series is set in Universal Century 0079 in the jungles of Southeast Asia. The Earth Federation and the Principality of Zeon are fighting a brutal guerrilla war for control of the area and its resources. Zeon's best hope for victory in the region rests with an experimental mobile armor and its pilot, Aina Sahalin. Meanwhile, the Earth Federation Army receive reinforcements in the form of Ensign Shiro Amada, newly named commander of the 08th MS Team. Aina and Shiro know each other from a mutual rescue in space, but when Shiro discovers that Aina is in fact the pilot of the Zeon mobile armor he is arrested for treason.

The Federation offers Shiro one chance at redemption: he must take the 08th MS Team deep into Zeon held territory to find Zeons' hidden base. With the Zeon backed into a corner, and the Federation dependent on Shiro and his team for victory, the star-crossed lovers must decide where their true allegiances lie: with each other, or with their respective sides.

== Characters ==
=== Main characters ===
SLt. Shiro Amada
Voiced by: Nobuyuki Hiyama (Japanese); Steve Cannon (English)
Shiro is the new platoon leader of the Earth Federation's 08th Mobile Suit Team stationed in Southeast Asia. Before he assumes this position, however, he befriends Aina Sahalin, a Zeon pilot, up in space and unbeknownst to both of them their fates become intertwined.

Aina Sahalin
Voiced by: Kikuko Inoue (Japanese); Emilie Brown (English)
A member of a noble family back in the Zeon homeland, Aina is the senior test pilot of a new mobile armor program led by her brother Ginias. While piloting her prototype Zaku amidst a debris field in space, she meets Shiro Amada and forms a bond with him even if they are on opposite sides of the war. Circumstances result in the two of them meeting again later in the series.

=== Support characters ===
Cpl. Eledore Massis
Voiced by: Keiji Fujiwara (Japanese); Eddie Frierson (English)
Massis is a veteran member of the 08th MS Team and drives the team's support hovertruck. He's not very brave and openly admits he's not cut out to be a soldier, but puts himself in danger when he has to, especially when Karen is involved.

Major general Ginias Sahalin
Voiced by: Sho Hayami (Japanese); Lex Lang (English)
Aina Sahalin's elder brother, Ginias is a Zeon officer assigned by the Zeon leadership to build a mobile weapon powerful enough to destroy the Earth Federation Forces military headquarters of Jaburo. Although Ginias is quite brilliant and a kind military superior, he is very cruel and calculative when it comes to completing his weapons he designs and he is willing to do away his allies who burden him. He also suffers from an unknown illness.

SGM Karen Joshua
Voiced by: Mami Koyama (Japanese); Debra Jean Rogers (English)
The team's longest-serving mobile suit pilot, Karen is initially underwhelmed when Shiro takes over the team with her as second-in-command. As a former medical student and the widow of a military doctor, Karen can double as a field medic in cases of emergency.

Kiki Rosita
Voiced by: Chinami Nishimura (Japanese); Michelle Ruff (English)
Kiki is the daughter of an anti-Zeon guerrilla resistance leader. She encounters Shiro just before he is taken captive by the guerrillas and is infatuated with him. When Shiro finally convinces them to assist the 08th MS Team, Kiki follows him, coordinating support and providing communication between the MS unit and the resistance.

Cpl. Michel Ninorich
Voiced by: Hiro Yuuki (Japanese); Tony Ricci (English)
Joining the 08th MS Team at the same time as Shiro, Michel is Eledore's partner in the support hovertruck, serving as navigator and gunner. Between battles, he writes letters to his girlfriend BB, who still lives in the space colonies.

Col. Norris Packard
Voiced by: Osamu Ichikawa (Japanese); Michael McConnohie (English)
An ace pilot assigned to Zeon forces in Southeast Asia as an observer, Norris is later stationed at Ginias Sahalin's secret base and sees Aina Sahalin work on the Apsalus mobile armor program. He dies in Episode 10 fighting Federation troops laying siege to the base after suffering a fatal blow from Shiro Amada.

Sgt. Terry Sanders Jr.
Voiced by: Tesshō Genda (Japanese); Steve Kramer (English)
The other veteran member of the 08th MS Team at the start of the series, Sanders has had a mean streak of bad luck: every team he would be assigned to is destroyed during their third mission together. Since he is the sole survivor, this earns him the unfortunate nickname of "Shinigami Sanders", "Sanders the Reaper" in the English version.

Major general Yuri Kellarny
Voiced by: Kyonosuke Kami (Japanese); Daran Norris (English)
A family friend of the Sahalins, Kellarny leads a Zeon military division in Europe. Although he acts gruff and ill-mannered around the Sahalins, he is depicted as an honorable soldier who always looks after his men. After the Odessa base falls to the Federation, Yuri leads the survivors of his division towards Ginias' base, hoping to find any launch vehicles. Ginias kills him as he tries to get in, in retaliation for trying to go over his head to cancel his current mobile weapon creation.

LTC. Kojima
Voiced by: Yuzuru Fujimoto (Japanese); Alfred Thor (English)
The commander of the 08th MS Team's parent unit, the Kojima Battalion, Kojima is a typical by-the-book officer who does whatever he is told by his superiors. Towards the end, however, he is visibly shaken by the brutal tactics of Captain Isan Ryer and defies him, thinking that enough good people have already died.

== Featured mobile suits ==
=== Earth Federation ===
1. RX-75 Mass Production Guntank (量産型ガンタンク) (Type: Soldier)
2. RB-79K Ball Type K (先行量産型ボール) (Type: Soldier)
3. RX-79[G] Ground Gundam (陸戦型ガンダム) (Type: Soldier)
4. RX-79[G]Ez-8 Gundam Ez8 (ガンダムEZ8) (Type: Commander)
5. RGM-79E Prototype GM (初期型ジム) (Type: Soldier)
6. RGM-79G Ground GM (陸戦型ジム) (Type: Soldier)
7. RGM-79G GM Sniper (ジム・スナイパー) (Type: Soldier)

=== Zeon ===
1. MSM-04 Acguy (アッガイ) (Type: Soldier)
2. MS-05 Zaku I (ザクI) (Type: Soldier)
3. MS-05 Topp's Zaku (トップ専用ザク) (Type: Commander)
4. MS-06 Zaku II (ザクII) (Type: Soldier)
5. MS-06J Dell's Zaku (デル専用ザク) (Type: Commander)
6. MS-06J Ash's Zaku (アス専用ザク) (Type: Commander)
7. MS-06JC Ground Zaku II (陸戦型ザクII) (Type: Soldier)
8. MS-06K Zaku Cannon (ザクキャノン) (Type: Soldier)
9. MS-06V Zaku Tank (ザクタンク) (Type: Soldier)
10. MS-06RD-4 Prototype Zaku II (宇宙用高機動試験型ザク) (Type: Soldier)
11. MS-07B-3 Gouf Custom (グフカスタム) (Type: Commander)
12. MS-07H-8 Gouf Flight Type (グフフライトタイプ) (Type: Soldier)
13. MS-09 Dom (ドム) (Type: Soldier)

== Media ==
=== Production and development ===
The series first took shape in 1995. The OVA's first episode released on January 25, 1996. After Takeyuki Kanda died suddenly on July 27, 1996, GONZO's Umanosuke Iida took over production for the rest of the series. The opening theme is Arashi no Naka de Kagayaite (嵐の中で輝いて; lit. Shine in the Storm) by Chihiro Yonekura while the ending themes are 10 Years After by Chihiro Yonekura (episodes 1-10), Mirai no Futari ni (未来の二人に; lit. The Future for Both of Us) by Chihiro Yonekura (episode 11), and Arashi no Naka de Kagayaite (嵐の中で輝いて; lit. Shine in the Storm) by Chihiro Yonekura (episode 12).

No.	Title	Original release date	English air date
1	"War for Two"; Transliteration: "Futari Dake no Sensou" (Japanese: 二人だけの戦争)	January 25, 1996	July 23, 2001
2	"Gundams in the Jungle"; Transliteration: "Mitsurin no Gandamu" (Japanese: 密林のガンダム)	January 25, 1996	July 24, 2001
3	"The Time Limit on Trust"; Transliteration: "Shinrai he no Genkai Jikan" (Japanese: 信頼への限界時間)	March 25, 1996	July 25, 2001
4	"The Demon Overhead"; Transliteration: "Zujō no Akuma" (Japanese: 頭上の悪魔)	March 25, 1996	July 26, 2001
5	"The Broken Order to Stand By"; Transliteration: "Yaburareta Taiki Meirei" (Japanese: 破られた待機命令)	October 25, 1996	July 27, 2001
6	"Battle Line on the Burning Sand"; Transliteration: "Nessa Sensen" (Japanese: 熱砂戦線)	December 18, 1996	July 30, 2001
7	"Reunion"; Transliteration: "Saikai" (Japanese: 再会)	October 25, 1997	July 31, 2001
8	"Duty and Ideals"; Transliteration: "Gunmu to Risō" (Japanese: 軍務と理想)	December 18, 1997	August 1, 2001
9	"Front Line"; Transliteration: "Saizensen" (Japanese: 最前線)	February 25, 1998	August 2, 2001
10	"The Shuddering Mountain, Part I"; Transliteration: "Furueru Yama (Zenpen)" (Japanese: 震える山(前編))	July 25, 1998	August 3, 2001
11	"The Shuddering Mountain, Part II"; Transliteration: "Furueru Yama (Kōhen)" (Japanese: 震える山(後編))	April 25, 1999	August 6, 2001
12	"Last Resort"; Transliteration: "Rasuto Rizōto" (Japanese: ラスト・リゾート)	July 25, 1999	August 7, 2001

=== Film ===
Mobile Suit Gundam: The 08th MS Team Miller's Report is a compilation film released on August 1, 1998. The film largely focuses on Shiro Amada's court martial over his concern towards the enemy. The film mixes footage from the first eight episodes along with new footage. It also introduces the titular character, Alice Miller, an Earth Federation investigator assigned to gather additional evidence against Shiro. The ending theme is Eien no Tobira (永遠の扉, lit. Gateway to Eternity) by Chihiro Yonekura. Miller's Report was not fully shown on TV in America, although the new scenes were all spliced into the eighth episode for the Toonami broadcast. Miller's Report was released on DVD in America separately from the main series, but is included as a fifth disc with all 12 episodes (4 discs) in the Collector's Edition Box Set. Bandai Visual released the film on Blu-ray in 2011. The film explains the plot connection between episodes eight and nine by showing the Eledore's return from leave, the court-martial after Shiro's defense of the village, and the team's issuance of new orders.

=== Manga ===
Mobile Suit Gundam 08th MS Team: U.C.0079+α, a manga adaptation by Umanosuke Iida, was serialized in Monthly Gundam Ace from 2007 to 2009 and collected into four volumes.

Preceded by Mobile Suit Gundam Wing	Gundam metaseries (production order); 1996 — 1999	Succeeded by After War Gundam X
Preceded by Mobile Suit Gundam	Gundam Universal Century timeline U.C. 0079	Succeeded by Mobile Suit Gundam: Requiem for Vengeance; Mobile Suit Gundam Thunderbolt; Mobile Suit Gundam 0080: War in the Pocket
