= Jin Urayama =

Japanese actor & voice actor

- Born: July 20, 1956 (age 70); Osaka, Japan
- Occupations: Actor, voice actor
- Height: 167 cm (5 ft 6 in)

Jin Urayama (浦山迅, Urayama Jin; born July 20, 1956) is a Japanese actor and voice actor from Osaka Prefecture. He is affiliated with Production Taiku.

== Filmography ==
=== Television animation ===
- Parappa the Rapper (2001) (The Prince (human))
- Kyo Kara Maoh! (2004) (Monk)
- Madlax (2004) (SSS)
- Blood+ (2005) (Veteran)
- Cluster Edge (2005) (General)
- Full Metal Panic!: The Second Raid (2005) (Middle-aged doctor)
- Speed Grapher (2005) (Professor)
- Super Robot Wars Original Generation: Divine Wars (2006) (Captain)
- Romeo × Juliet (2007) (Titus)
- Naruto: Shippuden (2009) (Gerotora)
- Highschool of the Dead (2010) (Tadashi Miyamoto (episode 2))
- Dance in the Vampire Bund (2010) (Katsuichi Mizoguchi)
- Francesca: Girls Be Ambitious (2014) (Dr. W.S. Clark)
- Cross Ange (2014) (The King of Rosenblum)
- Punch Line (2015) (Qmay Tsubouchi)
- Blue Exorcist: Kyoto Saga (2017) (Tatsuma Suguro)
- FLCL Progressive (2018) (Tonkichi)
- Vinland Saga (2019) (Ragnar)
- Godzilla Singular Point (2021) (Tsunetomo Yamamoto)
- Summer Time Rendering (2022) (Ginjirō Nezu)
- Spy × Family (2022) (Murdoch Swan)
- Blue Exorcist: Shimane Illuminati Saga (2024) (Tatsuma Suguro)
- Tonari no Yōkai-san (2024) (Tazenbō Fuchibiyama (Occhan))
- Orb: On the Movements of the Earth (2024) (Father Abbot)
- Blue Exorcist: Beyond the Snow Saga (2024) (Tatsuma Suguro)
- Catch Me at the Ballpark! (2025) (Ryuichi Igarashi)
- Let's Go Karaoke! (2025) (Boss)

=== OVA ===
- Saikano Another Love Story (2005) (Deputy secretary)
- Armored Trooper VOTOMS: Case; Irvine (2011) (Clemenceau)
- Mobile Suit Gundam: The Origin (2015) (Degwin Sodo Zabi)
- Kaitō Queen wa Circus ga Osuki (2022) (Inspector Kamikoshi)

=== ONA ===
- Kengan Ashura (2019) (Ken Ooya)

=== Theatrical animation ===
- Crayon Shin-chan: Fierceness That Invites Storm! Operation Golden Spy (2011) (Butter)
- Detective Conan: Dimensional Sniper (2014) (Commentator)
- Crayon Shin-chan: Mononoke Ninja Chinpūden (2022) (Elder)
- Sekiro: No Defeat (2026) (Sculptor)

=== Video games ===
- Soulcalibur Legends (2007) (Cervantes de León)
- Soulcalibur IV (2008) (Cervantes de León)
- Soulcalibur: Broken Destiny (2009) (Cervantes de León)
- Soulcalibur V (2012) (Cervantes de León)
- Final Fantasy XV (2016) (Verstael Besithia)
- Sekiro: Shadows Die Twice (2019) (Sculptor)
- Kingdom Hearts III (2019) (Narrator from Olympus)
- Resident Evil 3 (2020) (Dr. Nathaniel Bard)
- Dragon Quest Monsters: The Dark Prince (2023) (Royston)

=== Dubbing roles ===
==== Live-action ====
- Anthony Hopkins
  - Thor (Odin)
  - Thor: The Dark World (Odin)
  - Noah (Methuselah)
  - Solace (John Clancy)
  - Armageddon Time (Aaron Rabinowitz)
- Ace Ventura: Pet Detective (2025 BS10 Star Channel edition) (Riddle (Noble Willingham))
- American Gods (Mr. Wednesday (Ian McShane))
- Anne with an E (Matthew Cuthbert (R. H. Thomson))
- Back to the Future (2025 NTV edition) (Mr. Strickland (James Tolkan))
- Bad Asses (Bernie Pope (Danny Glover))
- Blade Runner: The Final Cut (Bryant (M. Emmet Walsh))
- Captain America: The First Avenger (Tower Keeper (David Bradley))
- Contagion (Rear Admiral Lyle Haggerty (Bryan Cranston))
- The Death and Life of Bobby Z (Johnson (Keith Carradine))
- Doubt (Father Brendan Flynn (Philip Seymour Hoffman))
- Drive-Away Dolls (Curlie (Bill Camp))
- Dumbo (Maximilian "Max" Medici (Danny DeVito))
- Dune (Thufir Hawat (Stephen McKinley Henderson))
- Fast Five (Chief of Police Alemeida)
- Firestarter (Dr. Joseph Wanless (Kurtwood Smith))
- Footloose (Uncle Wes Warnicker (Ray McKinnon))
- From Dusk till Dawn: The Series (Jacob Fuller (Robert Patrick))
- Game of Thrones (Robert Baratheon (Mark Addy))
- The Games Maker (Nicholas (Ed Asner))
- Ghostbusters: Afterlife (Hardware Store Owner (Tracy Letts))
- The Girl with the Dragon Tattoo (Dirch Frode (Steven Berkoff))
- The Golden Child (On-demand edition) (Old Goupa (Victor Wong))
- The Good Liar (Bryn (Mark Lewis Jones))
- Gossip Girl (Cyrus Rose (Wallace Shawn))
- Grace and Frankie (Robert Hanson (Martin Sheen))
- Harry Potter and the Deathly Hallows – Part 2 (Argus Filch (David Bradley))
- Jumanji: The Next Level (Eddie Gilpin (Danny DeVito))
- Layer Cake (Jimmy Price (Kenneth Cranham))
- Little House on the Prairie (2019 NHK BS4K edition) (Rev. Robert Alden (Dabbs Greer))
- Medium (District Attorney Manuel Devalos (Miguel Sandoval))
- Mortal Engines (Mr. Wreyland (Peter Rowley))
- Night at the Museum: Secret of the Tomb (Gus (Mickey Rooney))
- North Face (2020 BS Tokyo edition) (Hans Schlunegger (Hanspeter Müller))
- The O.C. (Caleb Nichol (Alan Dale))
- One Day (Steven (Ken Stott))
- One Tree Hill (Whitey Durham (Barry Corbin))
- Paddington 2 (Judge Gerald Biggleswade (Tom Conti))
- Pirates of the Caribbean: On Stranger Tides (Spanish Sea Captain (Juan Carlos Vellido))
- Pixels (Admiral Porter (Brian Cox))
- Point Break (Angelo Pappas (Ray Winstone))
- Predator (2001 TV Asahi edition) (Blain Cooper (Jesse Ventura))
- Project ALF (Gen. Myron Stone (John Schuck))
- The Ridiculous 6 (Frank Stockburn (Nick Nolte))
- Roman Holiday (2022 NTV edition) (Ambassador (Harcourt Williams))
- Run All Night (Eddie Conlon (Nick Nolte))
- Running Wild with Bear Grylls (Danny Trejo)
- Salt (Oleg Vassily Orlov (Daniel Olbrychski))
- Sarah's Key (Jules Dufaure (Niels Arestrup))
- Somewhere in Time (2021 BS Tokyo edition) (Dr. Gerard Finney (George Voskovec))
- St. Elmo's Fire (2022 The Cinema edition) (Mr. Beamish (Martin Balsam))
- Taxi Driver (Wizard (Peter Boyle))
- Today You Die (Bruno (Robert Miano))
- Transformers: Dark of the Moon (Ratchet (Robert Foxworth))
- Transformers: Age of Extinction (Ratchet)
- Unfaithful (2006 TV Asahi edition) (Tracy (Kate Burton))
- Unstoppable (Oscar Galvin (Kevin Dunn))
- Whiplash (Jim Neiman (Paul Reiser))

==== Animation ====
- The Adventures of Tintin (Thomson)
- The Angry Birds Movie (Judge Peckinpah)
- Arthur Christmas (Ernie Clicker)
- Bee Movie (Layton T. Montgomery)
- Cars (Doc Hudson)
- Cars 3 (Doc Hudson)
- Chip 'n Dale: Rescue Rangers (Captain Putty)
- Inside Out (Anger)
- Inside Out 2 (Anger)
- Jackie Chan Adventures (Shendu, Ratso, Fox, policeman)
- Kung Fu Panda 4 (Li Shan)
- Lego Star Wars: Droid Tales (Emperor Palpatine)
- Lego Star Wars: The Freemaker Adventures (Emperor Palpatine)
- Lego Star Wars: The Yoda Chronicles (Emperor Palpatine)
- Over the Garden Wall (The Woodsman)
- The Queen's Corgi (Pollux)
- Ratatouille (Skinner)
- The Simpsons (Seasons 15–present) (Homer Simpson)
- Secret Level (Ping Wu)
- Spider-Man (Presiding judge)
- Spider-Man and His Amazing Friends (Magneto, Mister Frump, Uncle Genju))
- Star Wars: Clone Wars (K'Kruhk)
- The Super Mario Bros. Movie (Kamek)
- Teen Titans (Bob)
- X-Men: The Animated Series (Toon Disney edition) (Magneto)
