= Tetsuo Kanao =

Japanese actor (born 1950)

- 金尾 哲夫
- Born: Tetsuo Kaneo; September 29, 1950 (age 75); Tokyo, Japan
- Occupations: Actor; voice actor
- Years active: 1977–present
- Agent: Theatre Company Subaru

Tetsuo Kanao (金尾哲夫, Kanao Tetsuo; born September 29, 1950) is a Japanese actor attached to Theatre Company Subaru.

== Filmography ==
=== Anime ===
List of voice performances in anime
Year	Title	Role	Notes	Source
1977	Manga Japanese picture scroll ja:まんが日本絵巻	Warlord / messenger 武将 / 使者		
1990	The Three-Eyed One	Gamble ガンケット		
1993	Yu Yu Hakusho	Bui 武威		
1994	Tottemo! Luckyman	Union cockman 合体コックマン		
1994	Maps	Zeo ゼオ	OVA ep 2	
1995	Wedding Peach	Uragano (reminiscence) ウラガーノ（回想）		
1996	B't X	B't Savannah		
1996	Lupin the Third Twilight ☆ Secret of Gemini ja:ルパン三世 トワイライト☆ジェミニの秘密	Zola ゾラ		
1997	Flame of Recca	Magnetic 磁生		
1998–99	Master Keaton	Doctor		
1999	Turn A Gundam	Michael Gern ミハエル・ゲルン		
1999	Blue Gender	Captain		
2000	Boogiepop Phantom	Manager		
2002	Petite Princess Yucie	Former king		
2002	GetBackers	Sakai (Ishibashi) 堺（石橋）		
2002	Weiβ Kreuz Gluhen	General Manager Inagaki 稲垣総主任		
2003	Ashita no Nadja	Alphonse · Jean · Murray アルフォンス・ジャン・マレー		
2003	Zatch Bell!	Ryuk		
2003	Scrapped Princess	Doyle Barrett ドイル・バレット		
2003	Avenger	Torquay トーキー		
2003	Kaleido Star: New Wings	Nice guy ナイスガイ		
2004	Saiyuki Reload Gunlock	Filbert Grouse フィルバート・グロース		
2004	Sgt. Frog	Tornado		
2004	Samurai Gun	Fiction / Priest 虚無僧 / 烈界		
2004	Bleach	Patros		
2005	Kyo Kara Maoh!	Odil オーディル	season 2	
2005	Speed Grapher	Seiji Ochiai 落合征二		
2005	Eureka Seven	Neighbor 近所の人		
2005	Cluster Edge	Military school principal 軍学校校長		
2006	Tales of Phantasia: The Animation	King Alvanista	OVA ep 4	
2006	D.Gray-man	Father		
2007	Hero Tales	Liu Jia 劉匠		
2007	Rental Magica	Executive 幹部		
2008	Golgo 13	Clamp		
2008	Tytania	Theodore セオドア		
2010	The Legend of the Legendary Heroes	Gainel ガイネル		
2011	Toriko	Kuromado		
2011	C	Shindou 進藤基		
2012	Lupin the Third: The Woman Named Fujiko Mine	Man of suits 背広の男		
2012	Kingdom	The king 昭王		
2012	Robotics;Notes	Sumio Nagafukada 長深田澄夫		
2013	The Eccentric Family	Emperor		
2013	Golden Time	Kimiko's father 香子の父		
2013	Pupipō!	Guerrogae erro グェロロゲェエロッ		
2014	Dragon Ball Z Kai	Smitty		[2]
2014	Happiness Charge PreCure	Namakelder		
2014	Chaika - The Coffin Princess	Konrad Steinmetz	2 seasons	
2014	Rage of Bahamut Genesis	Barossa バロッサ		
2015	The Heroic Legend of Arslan	Marhendra マーヘンドラ		
2015	Gangsta.	Chad Atkins チャド・アトキンス		
2015	Gate	Tarou Kanou	2 seasons	
2015	Concrete Revolutio	Daishi Akita	2 seasons	
2016	Dimension W	Colin Keys コリン・キーズ		
2016	The Great Passage	Kohei Araki	Tanio Kanemoto's name	
2017	Time Bokan: The Villains' Strike Back	Natsume Souseki 夏目漱石	Ep. 5	
2018	Release the Spyce	Leader of Nirai Kanai ニライカナイ首領	Ep. 8	
2019	Kono Oto Tomare! Sounds of Life	Gen Kudō		
2022	Saiyuki Reload: Zeroin	Filbert Grouse フィルバート・グロース		
2022	Mobile Suit Gundam: The Witch from Mercury Prologue	Vim Jeturk ヴィム・ジェターク	OVA	
2024	Oblivion Battery	Teitoku Baseball Team Manager		
2026	Star Wars: Visions Presents – The Ninth Jedi	Juro	ONA	

=== Film ===
List of voice performances in film
Year	Title	Role	Notes	Source
1994	Street Fighter II: The Animated Movie	Zangief		
2004	Detective Conan: Magician of the Silver Sky	Chief Kansei Uesugi		
2013	Lupin the 3rd vs. Detective Conan: The Movie	Luciano Carnevale		
2016	Tantei Opera Milky Holmes the Movie: Milky Holmes' Counterattack	Moran		
2026	Sekiro: No Defeat	Isshin Ashina		

=== Video games ===
List of voice performances in video games
Year	Title	Role	Notes	Source
1994–07	Yu Yu Hakusho games	Bui		
2000	Scandal スキャンダル	Onozuka Police Department 小野塚警部	PS1 / PS2	
2004	Zatch Bell!	Ryuk	PS1 / PS2	
2005	Kingdom Hearts II	Commander Sark	PS1 / PS2, Also Final Mix in 2007	
2009	Boku no Natsuyasumi 4	Oji (Yukio Shima) おじちゃん（島波幸雄）	PSP	
2009	Tales of Graces	Gareedo Ozwell, Eugen ガリード・オズウェル / オイゲン	Wii, also f in 2010	
2012	Robotics;Notes	Sumio Nagafukada 長深田澄夫	PS3, Xbox 360, also Elite in 2014	
2015	Dragon Quest VIII	King Clavius クラビウス王	3DS	
2017	Nioh	Sekishusai Yagya	PS4, PC	
2019	Sekiro: Shadows Die Twice	Isshin Ashina	Xbox One, PS4 & PC	
2020	Yakuza: Like a Dragon	Ryohei Hoshino	PS4	

=== Drama CDs ===
List of voice performances in drama CD and audio recordings
Year	Title	Role	Notes	Source
1996	Dragon Quest VI	Soldi / Tom ソルディ / トム		
2003	Holy Legend ja:聖杯伝説	Arlene Koi アーリーン・コーイ	Radio	

=== Tokusatsu ===
List of voice performances in tokukatsu
Year	Title	Role	Notes	Source
2016	Doubutsu Sentai Zyuohger	Amigard アミガルド	Ep. 4	
2017	Kamen Rider Build	Blood Stalk/Evolto/Kamen Rider Evol, Evol-Driver voice ブラッドスターク/エボルト/仮面ライダーエボル, エボルドライバー音声	Eps. 4 - 14, 16 - 17, 19 - 25, 28 - 49	
2018	Kamen Rider Build: Raising the Hazard Level With 7 Best Matches	Blood Stalk ブラッドスターク	OV	
2018	Kamen Rider Build the Movie: Be the One	Evolto エボルト	Movie	
2018	Kamen Rider Prime Rogue	Kamen Rider Evol 仮面ライダーエボル	OV	
2019	Build New World Kamen Rider Cross-Z	Blood Stalk/Evolto/Kamen Rider Evol ブラッドスターク/エボルト/仮面ライダーエボル	OV	

=== Dubbing roles ===
List of voice performances in overseas live-action dubbing
Year	Title	Role	Notes	Source
1994	In the Line of Fire	Mitch Leary	Voice dub for John Malkovich	
2011	Transformers: Dark of the Moon	Bruce Brazos	Voice dub for John Malkovich	
2018	Mile 22	James Bishop	Voice dub for John Malkovich	
2018	Bird Box	Douglas	Voice dub for John Malkovich	
2019	Velvet Buzzsaw	Piers	Voice dub for John Malkovich	
2020	Extremely Wicked, Shockingly Evil and Vile	Edward Cowart	Voice dub for John Malkovich	
2021	Ava	Duke	Voice dub for John Malkovich	
2021	Rogue Hostage	Congressman Sam Nelson	Voice dub for John Malkovich	
1982	Tron	Ed Dillinger	Voice dub for David Warner	
1989	Glory	Major Cabot Forbes	Voice dub for Cary Elwes	
1990	Island of Fire	Iron Ball	Voice dub for Andy Lau	
1991	The Naked Gun 2½: The Smell of Fear	Detective Nordberg	Voice dub for O. J. Simpson	
1991	New Jack City	Nick Peretti	Voice dub for Judd Nelson	
1992	A Few Good Men	Lieutenant Jonathan James Kendrick	Voice dub for Kiefer Sutherland	
1992	Passenger 57	Charles Rane	Voice dub for Bruce Payne	
1992	Reservoir Dogs	Mr. Blonde	Voice dub for Michael Madsen	
1993	The Firm	Eddie Lomax	Voice dub for Gary Busey	
1993	Much Ado About Nothing	Don Pedro	Voice dub for Denzel Washington	
1993	Nemesis	Germaine	Voice dub for Nicholas Guest	
1993	Striking Distance	Danny Detillo	Voice dub for Tom Sizemore	
1993	Tombstone	Johnny Ringo	Voice dub for Michael Biehn	
1994	Guarding Tess	Barry Carlisle	Voice dub for Edward Albert	
1994	Intersection	Richard Quarry	Voice dub for David Selby	
1994	Iron Will	Jack Stoneman	Voice dub for John Terry	
1994	The Santa Clause	Dr. Neil Miller	Voice dub for Judge Reinhold	
1994	Wolf	Stewart Swinton	Voice dub for James Spader	
1995	Crimson Tide	Lieutenant Peter 'Weps' Ince	Voice dub for Viggo Mortensen	
1995	Under Siege	Commander Krill	Voice dub for Gary Busey; TV Asahi edition	
1995	The Usual Suspects	U.S. Customs Special Agent David Kujan	Voice dub for Chazz Palminteri	
1995	Showgirls	Tony Moss	Voice dub for Alan Rachins	
1996	The Preacher's Wife	Britsloe	Voice dub for Lionel Richie	
1996	Ransom	Det. Jimmy Shaker	Voice dub for Gary Sinise	
1997	Lethal Weapon	Mr. Joshua	Voice dub for Gary Busey; TV Asahi edition	
1997	The Postman	General Bethlehem	Voice dub for Will Patton	
1997	Red Corner	Jack Moore	Voice dub for Richard Gere	
1997	Basquiat	Albert Milo	Voice dub for Gary Oldman	
1997	The Crow	Detective Torres	Voice dub for Marco Rodríguez; TV Tokyo edition	
1998	Les Misérables	Javert	Voice dub for Geoffrey Rush	
1998	Ronin	Vincent	Voice dub for Jean Reno	
1999	The Matrix	Cypher	Voice dub for Joe Pantoliano	
2000	Gun Shy	Charles Mayeaux	Voice dub for Liam Neeson	
2000	Pollock	Jackson Pollock	Voice dub for Ed Harris	
2001	On the Edge	Dr. Figure	Voice dub for Stephen Rea	
2001	Ignition	Joel MacAteer	Voice dub for Colm Feore	
2001	Dr. Dolittle 2	Jack Riley	Voice dub for Kevin Pollak	
2003	The Lord of the Rings: The Two Towers	Gríma	Voice dub for Brad Dourif	
2003	The Adventures of Pluto Nash	Mogan	Voice dub for Joe Pantoliano	
2003	The Core	Commander Robert Iverson	Voice dub for Bruce Greenwood	
2003	The Company	Choreographer #1	Voice dub for Lar Lubovitch	
2004	Control	Dr. Michael Copeland	Voice dub for Willem Dafoe	
2004	The Last Ride	Aaron Purnell	Voice dub for Will Patton	
2005	The Life Aquatic with Steve Zissou	Alistair Hennessey	Voice dub for Jeff Goldblum	
2005	Rome	Mark Antony	Voice dub for James Purefoy	
2005	The Fast and the Furious	Tanner	Voice dub for Ted Levine; TV Asahi edition	
2006	Eight Below	Dr. Andy Harrison	Voice dub for Gerard Plunkett	
2006	Freedomland	Detective Bobby Boyle	Voice dub for William Forsythe	
2007	The Bad News Bears	Roy Turner	Voice dub for Vic Morrow; DVD edition	
2007	Mr. Bean's Holiday	Carson Clay	Voice dub for Willem Dafoe	
2007	Ocean's Twelve	Italian Police Chief	NTV edition	
2008	The Fifth Commandment	Z	Voice dub for Roger Yuan	
2009	Indiana Jones and the Last Crusade	Ernst Vogel	Voice dub for Michael Byrne	
2009	Daybreakers	Charles Bromley	Voice dub for Sam Neill	
2010	Morning Glory	Jerry Barnes	Voice dub for Jeff Goldblum	
2010	Gossip Girl	William van der Bilt	Voice dub for James Naughton	
2011	The Adjustment Bureau	Richardson	Voice dub for John Slattery	
2011	Green Lantern	Robert Hammond	Voice dub for Tim Robbins	
2011	My Week with Marilyn	Laurence Olivier	Voice dub for Kenneth Branagh	
2011	The Rum Diary	Edward J. Lotterman	Voice dub for Richard Jenkins	
2012	John Carter	Colonel Powell	Voice dub for Bryan Cranston	
2012	Stand Up Guys	Doc	Voice dub for Christopher Walken	
2012	Total Recall	Cohaagen	Voice dub for Bryan Cranston	
2013	Game of Thrones	Tywin Lannister	Voice dub for Charles Dance	
2014	Falling Skies	Captain Dan Weaver	Voice dub for Will Patton; season 3 onwards	
2014	The Salvation	Peter	Voice dub for Mikael Persbrandt	
2014	The Missing	Julien Baptiste	Voice dub for Tchéky Karyo	
2015	The Eichmann Show	Leo Hurwitz	Voice dub for Anthony LaPaglia	
2015	Trumbo	Dalton Trumbo	Voice dub for Bryan Cranston	
2016	The Night Of	Dennis Box	Voice dub for Bill Camp	
2017	Guardians of the Galaxy Vol. 2	Ego	Voice dub for Kurt Russell	
2017	Justice League	Alfred Pennyworth	Voice dub for Jeremy Irons	
2017	Me Before You	Steven Traynor	Voice dub for Charles Dance	
2018	Paddington 2	Colonel Lancaster	Voice dub for Ben Miller	
2018	Westworld	The Man in Black	Voice dub for Ed Harris	
2020	Doctor Sleep	Dr. John Dalton	Voice dub for Bruce Greenwood	
2021	Zack Snyder's Justice League	Alfred Pennyworth	Voice dub for Jeremy Irons	
2022	Nightmare Alley	Peter Krumbein	Voice dub for David Strathairn	
2023	The Flash	Alfred Pennyworth	Voice dub for Jeremy Irons	
2023	The Sparks Brothers	Ron Mael	Voice dub for Ron Mael	

List of voice performances in overseas animation dubbing
Year	Title	Role	Notes	Source
1992	Batman: The Animated Series	Man-Bat		
2011	The Smurfs	Chef Smurf		
2014	Planes 2: Fire and Rescue	Blade Ranger		

=== Stage ===
- Flowers for Algernon (1990) (Matt Gordon)
