= My Ribdiculous Reincarnation =

Japanese light novel

- Light novel volume cover (original edition)

女神「異世界転生何になりたいですか」 俺「勇者の肋骨で」 (Megami "Isekai Tensei Nani ni Naritai desu ka" Ore "Yūsha no Rokkotsu de")
- Genre: Fantasy; Isekai
- Novel series
- Written by: Antai
- Published by: Shōsetsuka ni Narō; Kakuyomu
- Original run: November 29, 2017 – December 9, 2024
- Light novel
- Written by: Antai
- Illustrated by: Mebaru
- Published by: Takarajimasha
- Published: January 15, 2021 (original edition); April 2, 2026 (new edition)
- Volumes: 1
- Anime television series
- Directed by: Yasufumi Soejima
- Written by: Zipper Sōjō
- Music by: Yūta Uraki; Kayo Konishi; Yukio Kondō; Nomi (VSQ sports); Shunya Watanabe
- Studio: Qzil.la; S.o.K
- Licensed by: Crunchyroll: SEA: Tropics Entertainment
- Original network: Nippon TV, BS NTV, AT-X
- Original run: April 8, 2026 – June 24, 2026
- Episodes: 12
- icon

My Ribdiculous Reincarnation (Note: Japanese: 女神「異世界転生何になりたいですか」 俺「勇者の肋骨で」, Hepburn: Megami "Isekai Tensei Nani ni Naritai desu ka" Ore "Yūsha no Rokkotsu de"; lit. Goddess: "What Do You Want to Turn Into When You're Reincarnated in Another World?" Me: "Into a Hero's Rib") is a Japanese web novel series written by Antai. It was originally posted on the online publication platform Shōsetsuka ni Narō, with chapters posted between November 2017 and December 2024. It was later published as a light novel by Takarajimasha, which published a single volume with illustrations by Mebaru in January 2021; a new edition of the volume was released in April 2026. An anime television series adaptation produced by Qzil.la and S.o.K aired from April to June 2026. A manga adaptation illustrated by Hitori has been announced.

== Plot ==
After an untimely death, the protagonist finds himself reincarnated in another world. A goddess greets him and tells him he can be reincarnated as anyone he wants. He decides to reincarnate as a hero with a harem, but is told that it is so popular that he has to wait 50,000 years before he can be reincarnated. After finding out that others had shorter waiting times due to having more ridiculous requests, he decides to try out multiple reincarnations, including being a hero's rib and being a hermit crab.

== Characters ==
Protagonist (主人公, Shujinkō)
Voiced by: Atsushi Abe
The unnamed protagonist (referred to simply as 'I'), he lived a pathetic life before his untimely death. He becomes involved in absurd reincarnations in his next life.
Goddess (女神様, Megami-sama)
Voiced by: M.A.O
A goddess who greets recently-deceased people and helps them choose their chosen reincarnation. She is actually lazy.
Master Sockeye Salmon (紅鮭師匠, Benizake Shishō)
Voiced by: Daisuke Namikawa
Tanaka-san (田中さん)
Voiced by: Toshihiko Seki
God of Creation (創造神, Sōzō-shin)
Voiced by: Show Hayami
Jiyōku (ジヨーク)
Voiced by: Takahiro Ogata (Panther)

== Media ==
=== Light novel ===
The series is written by Antai, who originally began posting it as a web novel on the online publication platform Shōsetsuka ni Narō. Chapters were posted between November 29, 2017, and December 9, 2024; chapters were also posted to Kadokawa's online publication platform Kakuyomu. The series was one of the works cited at the 8th Internet Novel Awards. Takarajimasha later picked up the series for publication, releasing a single light novel volume on January 15, 2021; the volume features illustrations by Mebaru. A new edition of the volume was released on April 2, 2026.

| No. | Release date | ISBN |
|---|---|---|
| 1 | January 15, 2021 (original); April 2, 2026 (new) | 978-4-299-01262-3 (original); 978-4-299-07641-0 (new) |

=== Anime ===
An anime television series adaptation was announced on January 27, 2026. The series is produced by Qzil.la and S.o.K and directed by Yasufumi Soejima, with Zipper Sōjō handling series composition, Miki Matsumoto designing the characters, and Yūta Uraki, Kayo Konishi, Yukio Kondō, Nomi (VSQ sports) and Shunya Watanabe composing the music. It aired from April 8 to June 24, 2026, on Nippon TV's AnichU programming block and other networks. (Note: Nippon TV listed the series premiere on April 7 at 25:59, which is effectively April 8 at 1:59 a.m. JST.) The opening theme song is "Tensei Ganbō" (転生願望), performed by Shukatsu Club, and the ending theme song is "Nan-nan Desu ka?" (何なんですか？; 'Wh-what is it?'), performed by shallm. Crunchyroll is streaming the series. Tropics Entertainment licensed the series in Southeast Asia for streaming on the Tropics Anime Asia YouTube channel.

=== Manga ===
A manga adaptation illustrated by Hitori was announced on March 30, 2026. The first chapter of the manga was released at the end of the new edition of the light novel volume released on April 2, 2026.
