= Champignon Witch =

Japanese anime and manga series

- First tankōbon volume cover

シャンピニオンの魔女 (Shanpinion no Majo)
- Genre: Fantasy
- Manga
- Written by: Tachibana Higuchi
- Published by: Hakusensha
- English publisher: NA: Yen Press
- Imprint: HC Special
- Magazine: Manga Park
- Original run: October 18, 2019 – present
- Volumes: 7
- Anime television series
- Directed by: Yōsuke Kubo
- Written by: Yūko Kakihara
- Music by: Takeshi Hama
- Studio: Typhoon Graphics; Qzil.la
- Licensed by: Crunchyroll
- Original network: TBS, BS11, AT-X
- Original run: January 9, 2026 – March 20, 2026
- Episodes: 12
- icon

Champignon Witch (Japanese: シャンピニオンの魔女, Hepburn: Shanpinion no Majo) is a Japanese manga series written and illustrated by Tachibana Higuchi. It began serialization on Hakusensha's Manga Park manga website in October 2019. An anime television series adaptation produced by Typhoon Graphics and Qzil.la aired from January to March 2026.

== Plot ==
Luna is a young witch who lives alone in a forest known for its poisonous mushrooms. Feared and shunned by nearby villagers for being a black witch in a kingdom ruled by white witches, Luna is believed to bring illness and death because of the poisonous mushrooms that she leaves everywhere she touches. Despite her reputation, Luna is gentle and kind, spending her days studying mushrooms, brewing medicines, and quietly helping others from afar. One day she meets someone who changes the course of her life forever.

== Characters ==
Luna (ルーナ, Rūna)
Voiced by: Haruka Shiraishi
A talented and kind black witch who has lived for much longer than a normal human, despite her youthful appearance. Her skin and breath are poisonous and she leaves a trail of mushrooms everywhere she goes, caused by the fact that she was a cursed youngling. Because of this, people are generally afraid of her and she keeps to herself to avoid hurting anyone, only having the company of the magical creatures that live with her in her mushroom house.
Lize (リゼ, Rize)
Voiced by: Yuki Sakakihara
Beautiful noble boy who is a cursed youngling and seed to The End of All Things. Luna take him in and trains him to make sure he doesn't become a monster.
Claude (クロード, Kurōdo)
Voiced by: Jun Fukushima
A friend of Luna's, he is strict and acts mean, but he cares and watches out for Luna. He is the familiar for the great and powerful bird magician and is able to turn into a crow.
Minos (ミノス, Minosu)
Voiced by: Emiri Katō
Magical cow creature and companion of Luna who lives in the mushroom house with her. They turn into a cow when accompanying Luna to the village.
Merino (メリノー, Merinō)
Voiced by: Miho Okasaki
Magical sheep creature and companion of Luna who lives in the mushroom house with her. They can turn into a sheep on command.
Sisi (シシィ, Shishyi)
Voiced by: Misato Fukuen
Magical cat creature and companion of Luna who lives in the mushroom house with her. The former familiar of the cat witch who was taken in by Luna after she died.
Henri (アンリ, Anri)
Voiced by: Shōya Chiba
A handsome and friendly boy from the village that Luna draws and later befriends. It stated that he has family loyal to the white witches, but he is more open-minded. Luna and him fall in love, but she takes his memories of their love to save him.
Cat Witch (猫の魔女, Neko no Majo)
Voiced by: Akane Fujita
A former friend of Luna who uses magic related to cats. Luna calls her Miss Dorothy. Despite having a reputation for being mean, after getting to know Luna, she becomes more kind and cares deeply about Luna. She is executed as part of the black witch hunt.
Wind Mage (猫の魔女, Kaze no Mahōtsukai)
Voiced by: Kazuki Ura
A member of the black mage council who tends to run from his duties. He speaks crudely and tends to make a mess, even though he is quite powerful.

== Media ==
=== Manga ===
Written and illustrated by Tachibana Higuchi, Champignon Witch began serialization on Hakusensha's Manga Park website on October 18, 2019. A side-story was published in The Hana to Yume magazine the following week. Its chapters have been compiled into seven tankōbon volumes as of January 2026.

During their panel at San Diego Comic-Con 2026, Yen Press announced that they had licensed the series for English publication.

No.	Original release date	Original ISBN	English release date	English ISBN
1	April 20, 2020	978-4-592-22727-4	April 27, 2027	979-8-855-42949-7
2	December 18, 2020	978-4-592-22748-9	—	—
3	September 17, 2021	978-4-592-22749-6	—	—
4	August 19, 2022	978-4-592-22869-1	—	—
5	July 20, 2023	978-4-592-22892-9	—	—
6	December 20, 2024	978-4-592-23047-2	—	—
7	January 20, 2026	978-4-592-23115-8	—	—

=== Anime ===
An anime television series adaptation was announced on December 13, 2024. It is produced by Typhoon Graphics and Qzil.la, and directed by Yōsuke Kubo, with scripts written by Yūko Kakihara, characters designed by Miki Matsumoto, and music composed by Takeshi Hama. The series aired from January 9, 2026, to March 20, 2026, on TBS and other networks. (Note: TBS listed the series premiere on January 8 at 25:58, which is effectively January 9 at 1:58 a.m. JST.) The opening theme song is "Maho Tsukai no Nikki" (魔法使いの日記; lit. 'Magician's Diary'), performed by Rosu, and the ending theme song is "Kimi wa" (君は; lit. 'You Are'), performed by Ms. Ooja. Crunchyroll is streaming the series.

==== Episodes ====
No.	Title	Directed by	Written by	Storyboarded by	Original release date
1	"Luna the Black Witch"; Transliteration: "Kuro Majo Rūna" (Japanese: 黒魔女ルーナ)	Saki Miura	Yūko Kakihara	Yōsuke Kubo	January 9, 2026 (Note: The first 2 episodes aired back-to-back.)
Luna is lonely witch who has lived a long life, despite her youthful appearance. She is a black witch, meaning she does not swear her loyalty to the kingdom like the highly regarded white witches. Combined with the fact that she leaves poisonous mushrooms everywhere she touches, the townspeople look at her with fear and suspicion. She only goes into town to sell medicine she makes to the apothecary and buy books, which she finds as an escape. It is revealed from her discussions with the book keeper that she actually absorbs negative enegy from the air and that is what causes the mushrooms to be poisonous. One day while walking home, she sees a handsome boy flirting with a girl, and she is inspired to draw him. The drawing ends up having a soul and she dances with him in the moonlight. Seeing the boy in town later, he has lost all the life he had before, so Luna takes the soul from the drawing and gives it back to him. Back to his normal self, he can't help but notice Luna.
2	"The Destined One"; Transliteration: "Unmei no Hito" (Japanese: 運命の人)	Saki Miura	Yūko Kakihara	Yōsuke Kubo	January 9, 2026
On her next trip to the village, the boy from her drawings, Henri, tries to talk with her. She is surprised and uses her mushrooms to hide, but eventually she relaxes. Henri reveals that he comes from a family of white witches, but his powers are not strong compared to the rest of his family. The city guard is called and chases after Luna, but she escapes with the help of Claude, who flies her away as a crow. She hides at the bookstore where Claude orders her not to see him again, in order to protect all the other black witches and wizards. Later she draws Henri again and the drawing comes alive again. They say their feelings to each other and enjoy the next few days together. Henri is bedridden because of the time he spends in his drawing form. In order to save Henri, Luna absorbs the feelings he has for her into a mushroom. He no longer has memories of the love he once had for her, and they both go on with their lives, with Luna making less trips to the village over time. While swimming in the river with her magical friends, she encounters someone in the river bleeding.
3	"The Cursed Youngling"; Transliteration: "Noroi no Ko" (Japanese: 呪いの仔)	Tabihito	Jun Kumagai	Tabihito	January 16, 2026
Luna struggles with what to do after finding the stabbed boy in the river because she can't touch him without posioning him. Luckily Claude happens to spot them, and Luna bribes him to help with some shiny stones she found. She finds that the knife has a terrible poison on it, and she struggles to absorb it. She runs to her master, a giant golden mushroom, who helps her by absorbing the poison which she can't contain. He tells her that she encountered the one destined to become The End of All Things, the cursed youngling. Back at the mushroom house, the council of black witches is there to take the cursed youngling. They explain that the boy is a seed for The End of All Things, a horrible monster born from the pollution of the world that will poison everything in its path. Luna refuses to give him up, and it is revealed that Luna was once a cursed youngling as well.
4	"The Black Witch Council"; Transliteration: "Kuro Majo Kaigi" (Japanese: 黒魔女会議)	Shogo Shimizu	Jun Kumagai	Amawa	January 23, 2026
It is explained that Luna had strong magical powers before she was a cursed youngling, and she was able to escape her fate because of it. The flame magician tries to kill the boy, but she digs a hole and escapes. Claude brings her back and the bird magician lets her speak. She pleads to the council to let her raise the boy so he can also overcome The End of All Things. The council votes, but it is a tie until the cat witch, a deceased friend of Luna's, appears and provides her support. They decide to let Luna train the boy, giving her three years to prove he is strong enough, or he will be sentenced to death. Claude is ordered to stay and watch over them, and the council will randomly appear and give the boy tests. After they leave, Luna passes out from exhaustion.
5	"I Cannot Return to the Cat Forest"; Transliteration: "Neko no Mori ni wa kaerenai" (Japanese: 猫の森には帰れない)	Yōsuke Kubo	Yūko Kakihara	Takashi Kamei	January 30, 2026
In a flashback to when she first became a black witch, she recalls her first time meeting the cat witch. Originally jealous of how quickly she became a black witch, the cat witch was mean to Luna in hopes of scaring her off, but Luna was do lonely and used to being treated badly that she didn't notice her malintent. After having tea with Luna, she has a change of heart and starts to become more kind, showing Luna the bookstore and visiting her at the mushroom house more often. After trying to save a cat captured at the castle, the cat witch is executed, and Luna is asked to cleanse the grief and anger mushrooms where she was executed. In the present, the boy is having a nightmare about his past leading up to his stabbing. His memories drift away, but he hangs onto a memory with his mother. She explains that his true name holds magical power, and that he is destined to become King someday. He wakes up to Luna and says his true name, Lizel.
6	"The First Day"; Transliteration: "Ichi-ni-chime" (Japanese: 一日目)	Shōgo Shimizu	Jun Kumagai	Masato Satō	February 6, 2026 (Note: This episode aired at 2:08 a.m. JST, 10 minutes after the original air time on TBS.)
Lize is using magic to write his feelings in a diary, which helps prevent any negative emotions from building up inside of him. He has improved using magic, but is still clumsy, which worries and irritates Luna. In a flashback, Lizel wakes up from the events of the previous episode, and emits a great power when his true name is spoken. It is explained that white witche's power comes from their true name, so Luna gives him the name Lize to protect him. She tries to be strict with him, but struggles because of her kind personality. Claude keeps berating him and Luna, telling them that Lize has to do everything with magic if he is to improve quick enough. Lize sees a black fog of negative emotions around Claude, and after he absorbs it, Claude gets angry and says he can never touch him or Luna. He overhears Claude telling Luna that he is a poison monster and if he doesn't improve soon, they will have to kill him, prompting Lize to run into the black forest in fear.
7	"The Magic Diary"; Transliteration: "Mahō Nikki" (Japanese: 魔法日記)	Jun Saitō & Kosuke Iwanaga	Jun Kumagai	Shinichi Watanabe	February 13, 2026
Lize is running, but stops to help a mouse who ate a poisnous mushroom. Claude and Luna catch up to him, and Luna saves him from being overwhelmed by poison. Whenever Luna absorbs poisonous mushrooms from Lize, he loses memories and growth from his magical training. To prevent this, Luna teaches Lize how to extract these negative feelings by writing them in a diary. This helps prevent the poison from building up, but he still loses memories from these experiences, making him feel confused and alone. Luna makes some bouncy mushrooms for Lize, and he has fun playing on them, but when he almost falls and Luna has to save him, he generates a negative memory. He feels conflicted, not wanting to get rid of the bad memory if it means he loses the happy one as well. One day he meets the lord of the forest, and Lize tells him about his conflicting feelings and how he feels about Luna, all while Luna is secretly listening. The lord of the forest tells Lize about how Luna's body is poison. That night, wanting to feel connected to someone, Lize wears a sock on his hand and holds Luna's hand while sleeping, and he has a nice dream after that.
8	"White Witches and Black Witches"; Transliteration: "Shiro Majo to Kuro Majo" (Japanese: 白魔女と黒魔女)	Aya Kawamura	Yūko Kakihara	Ryō Ogawa	February 20, 2026
Luna is a black witch, and black witches don't get sustenance through eating, but instead by absorbing the energy from living things. Since Lize is a white witch, he needs food like normal humans. Since he doesn't like the food Luna cooks, he has lost weight and it has been a constant bother for him. Luna tries to buy normal ingredients in the town, but is sent away because of her status. She finds sellers on the outside of town, but they will only sell to her for multiple times the regular price. The food makes Lize happy, and he decides to starting growing his own food in a garden. He is still struggling to use magic as well as he is expected, in part because he is a white witch who use their powers different than black witches. One day he is able to see spirits who tell him he needs yo learn how to use charms, which would enhance his power. They tell him to sing a song, and he does, which awakens his powers. It is explained that love is what awakens his powers, meaning he feels a love for Luna. The spirits offer their powers, and he feels happy that he has tinally made progress, but Claude expresses concern for Luna.
9	"The House in the Black Forest"; Transliteration: "Kuroi mori no oie" (Japanese: 黒い森のお家)	Aya Kawamura	Yūko Kakihara	Ryō Ogawa	February 27, 2026
Lize asks Luna about what she would do if she felt an intense sadness, so she makes him a tea with tear mushrooms that will make him cry, which helps him feel better. Luna then extracts his tears and grows new tear mushrooms, so he can use them whenever he needs to cry. Lize sees a drawing of two people kissing in a book and decides to ask Luna about it, wondering if their relationship meant they could kiss like that, but Luna says it doesn't apply for someone with a poison body. Lize asks if he could kiss her hand through a magic cloth, which Luna allows. Afterwards, he says he hopes he can kiss Luna on the lips one day, leaving Luna surprised, also revealing that he was just acting like he didn't know so he could kiss her. Lize is sent to the village to go shopping, and on his way back, he is attacked by a poison crow who tries to steal their goat. Lize uses the special seeds given to him by the spirits to capture the crow and conjure a special sheet that will help the crow, but this angers the spirits who wanted him to kill the crow.
10	"Reunion"; Transliteration: "Saikai" (Japanese: 再会)	Shogo Shimizu	Jun Kumagai	Shinichirō Watanabe	March 6, 2026
The End of All Things has appeared on the country border, and the Wind Mage has gone to deal with it. With more refugees in the city, the air has gotten polluted and the book seller sends a letter to Luna asking her to come and purify the air. The city has become dangerous, with criminals and the sick everywhere. They start throwing rocks at Luna and refuse to listen to Lize's pleading. Luna traps Lize and Minos in her hat so they are safe, and she continues purufying the village, despite the villagers anger. Lize feels helpless, vowing to become strong enough to protect Luna one day. Suddenly a white mage and an officer arrive, capturing her with a vine. The officer is revealed to be Henri, who has forgotten Luna. Despite not remembering their time together, he reveals that he wants to help her, feeling a desire to protect her, even though he has a wife and kids now. Lize and Minos escape from the hat, but a man suddenly explodes, shooting The End of All Things' poison everywhere. The Wind Mage and Claude save him, with the Wind Mage cleaning up all the poison. Lize runs to find Luna, seeing her talking with Henri.
11	"The Councilor"; Transliteration: "Shingikan" (Japanese: 審議官)	Sachi Miura	Yūko Kakihara	Hiroyuki Shimasu	March 13, 2026
The wind mage interrupts Luna's reunion, with Lize collapsing from the poison he has been exposed to. The villagers and the white mage find them, and Henri tells them a place inside the castle that Wind Mage teleports them to. The Wind Mage reveals he has been sent to give Lize his first test, which causes him to pass out. He feels overwhelmed and jealous, seeing how Luna acts around Henri, and is upset that he can never remember anything because he is always losing his memories and it prevents him from growing. He attempts to dispel the poison himself, growing a wolfsbane plant from his hand, but the Wind Mage says it is not enough. Suddenly the Bird Magician arrives, revealing they teleported to his home, introducing his butler Maximillian as well. He reveals that he has been helping the bookseller, who Luna came to town to help. When Minos suggests she send a mushroom to give him her medicine, the Bird Magician says Luna should not since she unstable because of taboo magic, and Lize realizes it is because she is feeling love, which is poisonous for black witches.
12	"Lize, the Black Witch's Apprentice"; Transliteration: "Kuro Majo no Deshi Rize" (Japanese: 黒魔女の弟子リゼ)	Jun Saitō & Kosuke Iwanaga	Yūko Kakihara	Shinichi Watanabe	March 20, 2026
The Wind Mage asks Luna to remove the posion from him, which he has accumulated over time from his duties. He then takes Lize to test him, getting Lize to confess his feelings for Luna, but says he needs to let go of these feelings. Lize protests, and says a Black Witch would never understand how painful it is to be in love. The Wind Mage confides that he was once in love, but it was not meant to be, so he cast his feelings to the wind. The beauty of his feelings as he cast them away gave him hope that he had a heart and it helps him fulfill his duties. He tells Lize that forcing his feelings onto Luna is cruel, because she is not able to accept them and they just cause her pain. Lize finally accepts that he must let these feelings go, and he lets Lize pass the test. Before he leaves, the Wind Mage tells Luna to call him Gustave, and that he will come again when the poison builds up. When Lize wakes up, he has reveals that his mushroom friend in his brooch carries his diary, so he will not forget his love for Luna. He takes his love as a source of power for his magic, vowing to get stronger to protect Luna.

== Reception ==
The series has been recommended by manga artist Chica Umino and artist Yuko Higuchi.
