= Sekiro: No Defeat =

2026 Japanese anime television series

- Created by: FromSoftware
- Written by: Takuya Satō
- Directed by: Kenichi Kutsuna
- Voices of: Daisuke Namikawa; Miyuki Satou; Kenjiro Tsuda; Jin Urayama; Shizuka Itō; Akimitsu Takase; Takaya Hashi; Tetsuo Kanao
- Opening theme: "Blu" by Ryuichi Sakamoto
- Composer: Shuta Hasunuma

Production
- Animator: Qzil.la
- Production company: Arch

Related
- Anime film

Sekiro: No Defeat
- Directed by: Kenichi Kutsuna
- Written by: Takuya Satō
- Music by: Shuta Hasunuma
- Studio: Qzil.la
- Licensed by: Animec
- Released: September 4, 2026

Sekiro: No Defeat is an upcoming Japanese anime television series animated by Qzil.la, produced by Arch and directed by Kenichi Kutsuna. It is based on the video game Sekiro: Shadows Die Twice and is set to premiere in January 2027.

== Voice cast ==
Character	Japanese
Wolf	Daisuke Namikawa
Kuro/The Divine Heir	Miyuki Satou
Genichiro Ashina	Kenjiro Tsuda
Sculptor	Jin Urayama
Emma	Shizuka Itō
Hanbei	Akimitsu Takase
Owl	Takaya Hashi
Isshin Ashina	Tetsuo Kanao

== Production ==
An anime adaptation of Sekiro: Shadows Die Twice was announced at Gamescom 2025. It is produced by Qzil.la and directed by Kenichi Kutsuna, with Takuya Satō writing the scripts, Takahiro Kishida designing the characters, and Shuta Hasunuma composing the music. The series was originally scheduled for 2026, but was later delayed. It is set to premiere in January 2027, and will run for eight episodes. Crunchyroll is set to stream the series outside of Japan. A theatrical edition of the anime opened in Japanese theaters on September 4, 2026 by Animec. The theme song is "Blu", originally released in 2014, by composer Ryuichi Sakamoto.
