= Gangsta (manga) =

2011 manga

- The cover of the first manga volume released in Japan on 8 July 2011
- Genre: Adventure, thriller
- Manga
- Written by: Kohske
- Published by: Shinchosha
- English publisher: NA: Viz Media
- Magazine: Comic Bunch (2011–2024); Comic Bunch Kai (2024–)
- Original run: March 2011 – present
- Volumes: 9
- Manga

Gangsta.: Cursed
- Written by: Kohske
- Illustrated by: Syuhei Kamo
- Published by: Shinchosha
- English publisher: NA: Viz Media
- Magazine: Quarterly Comic Go Go Bunch
- Original run: 9 April 2014 – 9 February 2018
- Volumes: 5
- Audio drama
- Original run: 27 August 2014 – May 2016
- Episodes: 5
- Anime television series
- Directed by: Shūkō Murase; Kōichi Hatsumi
- Produced by: Natsumi Mori; Hirotsugu Ogisu; Masayuki Nishide; Yoshiyuki Shioya; Yōko Shiraishi; Ryūichi Ōkubo; Naoko Endō; Hayato Hori
- Written by: Shinichi Inotsume
- Music by: Tsutchie
- Studio: Manglobe
- Licensed by: AUS: Madman Entertainment; NA: Funimation; UK: Anime Limited
- Original network: ABC, Tokyo MX, TV Aichi, BS11
- English network: NA: Funimation Channel
- Original run: 1 July 2015 – 27 September 2015
- Episodes: 12
- Novel
- Written by: Jun'ichi Kawabata
- Published by: Shinchosha
- Imprint: Shicho Bunko nex
- Published: 1 August 2015

Gangsta (stylized as GANGSTA.) (Japanese: ギャングスタ, Hepburn: Gyangusuta) is a Japanese manga series written and illustrated by Kohske. It has been published in Shinchosha's monthly magazine Comic Bunch since March 2011. The series has inspired a spin-off manga, an audio drama series, an anime television series, and an original novel. The anime series was the last to be produced by animation studio Manglobe before its bankruptcy.

== Synopsis ==
=== Setting ===
The story of GANGSTA. takes place in the city of Ergastulum (エルガストルム, Erugasutorumu), a place filled to the brim with hoodlums, prostitutes, and dirty cops. It is governed by four major mafia families. Each syndicate controls a district of the city and distribute specific rackets. However, Ergastulum is ultimately an open-air internment camp for superhuman individuals known as "Twilights" (黄昏, Tasogare), also called "Tags" for the government issued dogtags they are required to wear. Twilights are the descendants of those who took the drug, Cerebret, developed during wartime to create enhanced soldiers, increasing their strength, speed and agility. Their children inherit these qualities, making them an unintended consequence. They are dependent on consistent doses of Cerebret to stay alive and avoid withdrawal symptoms. At the same time, however, it slowly poisons them, significantly slashing their lifespans and giving them disabilities. They are kept under surveillance, having been herded into Ergastulum, and xenophobia between them and the "Normal" non-Twilight refugees who settled there is constantly brewing. The Cerebret they need to survive is strictly regulated, expensive, and used to keep the Twilights on a short leash.

=== Plot ===
Two "Handymen" named Worick Arcangelo and Nicolas Brown take on jobs for both the mob and the police force that no one else can handle. After a job of crushing a gang, Worick decided to spare and help the amnesiac sole survivor Alex under their wing for the time being.

One day, Nicolas and Worick are brought in by the police for questioning on the mass murders that have taken place in the sixth district. All of the bodies appear to exclusively be Twilights. However, they leave quickly when Daniel Monroe calls for their assistance. Monroe is being attacked by a young Twilight named Doug, a member of the Pauklee mercenary guild. There Nicolas battles Doug to a standstill, but their fight is interrupted by the guild's head, Gina and her high-ranked assistant, Ginger. Nicolas recovers along with Doug at Dr. Theo's clinic. After recuperating, Doug divulges that his mission was given to him by the Corsica family, who are infamous anti-Twilight advocates. In addition, Daniel Monroe's right-hand man, Ivan, is revealed to be a mole for the Corsica family.

The anti-Twilights sentiment in Ergastulum steadily increases as the murder rate of Twilights continue, leading the Handymen to take a job gathering stray Twilights to be brought under the Christiano Family's protection. Hiding them within the family's club, Bastard. While Worick and Nic are out, Alex stays inside the club and is encouraged to sing for the patrons. Eventually, the club is attacked by the Twilight Hunters. Loretta's bodyguards, Galahad and Marco momentarily hold them off until Nicolas arrives and engages the Hunters in a brutal fight. Eventually they subdue Nic, preparing to kill him before his reinforcements arrive in the form of Worick, Doug, and most importantly Ginger who the two quickly realize they can't defeat. Forcing them to hastily retreat into the night.

The Paulklee Guild is attacked by two hunters, wanting to test their defenses. The figures reveal themselves as members of the Third Destroyers and agents of Uranus Corsica. In the assault, Doug is killed. Upon learning that one of the hunters is Delico's long-lost sister, Erica, him and Yang resolves to go look for her. They ask around if anyone has seen Erica, but with no luck. As they search District 7, a young Twilight named Heather attacks them, mistaking Delico for Erica. Delico and Yang manage to convince Heather to guide them to Erica's known location. After the attack on Bastard, Nic is assigned to protect Loretta and Worick goes to help reinforce the Monroe mansion. Only to find that Monroe himself is nowhere to be found. When speaking to Miles, the estate is attacked by Striker, a member of the Destroyers looking for Daniel. Striker swiftly decimates the estate's security but is eventually driven off when Worick injects him with a downer. In the conflict, Worick is stabbed and thrown out of a window.

On this same day, Connie goes to her grandmother's shop and encounters another Destroyer, Berreta. Believing she's a customer, Connie offers her some cigarettes, but Beretta proceeds to kidnap her. Being tied up and gagged, Beretta then presents Connie as a gift to Striker, who is very pleased. While Worick is recovering at Dr. Theo's clinic, Nicolas speaks to the doctor about an experimental version of Cerebrer. Bestowing the user, a stable amplification of their overall strength. Injecting Nic before he sets off to search for the two Hunters. As the two parties search for Erica, Nic comes across Yang and Delico in an alleyway. He further explains that he's here to interrogate Mikhail. Also making it clear that Delico will have three chances to kill or capture Erica before he takes over and does it himself. Delico approaches their hideout in disguise to lure Mikhail out. As Nicolas fights Mikhail, Erica appears before Delico. Who she seems not to recognize, stealing his tags as he pleads for her to acknowledge him. Yang and Delico attempt to subdue Erica before Nicolas is drawn into the fight as well. Delico and Nicolas manage to immobilize Mikhail, and then Monroe and Ivan appear. Monroe reveals that he was behind the attack on the orphanage as well as Erica's kidnapping and Ivan routinely sexually assaults her revealing himself as her "handler". During this, Nic is starting to come down on the Celebret and feeling sickly. Enraged, Yang lunges forward and aiming his gun at Monroe. Delico reflexively shoots Yang in Monroe's defense, but soon realizes his mistake. Nic then attacks Daniel, who incapacitates him by shooting him in the leg. Monroe, Ivan and Erica depart, leaving the injured Mikhail behind. Not before long, Heather arrives with help from Worick, Marco and Theo.

At the clinic, Nicolas start to have a seizure as a side-effect to the experimental Cerebrer and Yang is in critical condition. Theo is ready to consider his tests on Nic a failure and began to administer a downer, but Nic knocks it out of his hand, telling him to give Yang more attention. While at the Destroyers' warehouse, Constance escapes from her restraints and stabs Sig in the thigh with a shard of glass. In retaliation, Striker tears her left arm off and sends it to Marco. Leading Marco to venture out on his own to retrieve her. On the way, Marco is ambushed by Colt, only to be saved by Galahad and the Guild. Finally reaching the warehouse, Marco battles Striker and Beretta. After fleeing with Constance, Striker catches up with them, leading the couple to use a suicide bomb as a last resort. Leaving Striker critically injured.

Shortly after the appearance of the Hunters and Destroyers in Ergastulum, Worick murders Miles and presents the severed head to the Corsica family, leaving behind some money and a note for Alex, telling her to leave the city while she still can. While Nicolas is recovering at the Theo's clinic, four members of the Guild attempt to apprehend him, Theo and Alex. Nic attempts to fight them off but is unsuccessful. The Guild brings them into custody for questioning. Worick begins working for Corsica under the name "Storage". Utilizing his photographic memory as his strongest asset. While meeting with Uranos, its revealed that Corsica placed the Hunters under his control. So, they may carry out the annihilation of all Twilights within the city.

== Characters ==
=== Main characters ===
Worick Arcangelo
Voiced by: Junichi Suwabe, Ayumu Murase (young) (Japanese); Ian Sinclair, Justin Briner (young) (English)
Worick Arcangelo (ウォリック・アルカンジェロ, Worikku Arukanjero) (formerly Wallace Arcangelo) is Nic's Handymen partner. His abusive father hired Nic as Worick's personal guard, but Nic killed Worick's abusive family (with his permission) in a fit of rage after witnessing Worick's father press a lit cigarette into his son's left eye over which he now wears a patch. He has been a gigolo since he was thirteen, and views this as his main job. He is highly intelligent and has hyperthymesia enabling him to memorize vast amounts of information. He carries a M1911A1 pistol.
Nicolas Brown
Voiced by: Kenjiro Tsuda, Natsuki Hanae (young) (Japanese); Brandon Potter, Micah Solusod (young) (English)
Nicolas Brown (ニコラス・ブラウン, Nikorasu Buraun), or Nic, is Worick's Handymen partner. He is a "Twilight", the result of a former West Gate mercenary named Gaston Brown sleeping with a Twilight prostitute. Gaston had impregnated the prostitute for the sole purpose of avoiding the expense of hiring a Tagged mercenary, and murdered the woman after Nic was born. Nic was abused by Gaston, who saw him as nothing more than a monster. He is deaf, and communicates primarily through sign language, but has exceptionally strong vision and lip reading skills. As a child mercenary, he was hired by the Arcangelo family to be Worick's bodyguard. Like all Twilights, he is identified by the dog tags that he wears. He is known as a "faker" because although his natural ability is a B/5 level Twilight, he can gain the almost superhuman abilities of an A/0 level by overdosing on Cerebret.
Alex Benedetto
Voiced by: Mamiko Noto (Japanese); Felecia Angelle (English)
Alex Benedetto (アレックス・ベネデット, Arekkusu Benedetto), or Ally, is a former prostitute. She joins the Handymen after the police have Nic and Worick eliminate the gang she was working for, and Worick decides to spare her life. Alex was previously under the control of Barry Abbott, who is suspected to have drugged her to keep her submissive. She only remembers a few things, including her name, and later it is revealed that she is not from Ergastulum and is unfamiliar with life in there. She is learning sign language in order to communicate better with Nic, and on several occasions has comforted Worick when the latter was in the throes of a nightmare. She is a calm, caring person who is unafraid of violence when Worick, Nic, or Nina, are threatened. She is revealed to be a talented singer and occasionally works for the Cristiano family in that capacity. She has a younger brother named Emilio, who she worked to support, but hasn't seen him since childhood.

=== Supporting characters ===
Dr. Theo
Voiced by: Satoshi Mikami (Japanese); Robert McCollum (English)
Dr. Theo (テオ, Teo) is a doctor who supplies Nic and other Twilights with Cerebret and other treatments. He runs a small clinic in District 7 and tries to stay neutral between the rival gangs. He is missing two fingers on his left hand. Dr. Theo is a kind person, but displays a hidden dark side when his clinic and Nina are threatened.
Nina
Voiced by: Aoi Yūki (Japanese); Bryn Apprill (English)
Nina (ニナ) is a young girl who works at Dr. Theo's clinic as a nurse, and is close friends with Worick and Nicolas.
Chad Adkins
Voiced by: Tetsuo Kanao (Japanese); John Swasey (English)
Chad Adkins (チャド・アトキンス, Chado Atokinsu) is a police officer in Ergastulum. He hires Nic and Worick to do jobs for the police and often has to clean up their messes when they get into trouble. There are indications in the manga that when Nic and Worick were young teens that Adkins acted as a protector and surrogate father to them.
Daniel Monroe
Voiced by: Katsuhisa Hōki (Japanese); Mark Stoddard (English)
Daniel Monroe (ダニエル・モンロー, Danieru Monrō) is a mafia boss, and head of one of the three main 'gangs' in Ergastulum. He is Worick and Nic's former employer.
Delico
Voiced by: Tomohisa Hashizume (Japanese); Marcus D. Stimac (English)
Delico (デリコ, Deriko) is a rank D/0 Twilight who works for the Monroe Family.
Loretta Cristiano Amodio
Voiced by: Kana Ueda (Japanese); Alexis Tipton (English)
Loretta Cristiano Amodio (ロレッタ・クリスティアーノ・アモディオ, Roretta Kurisutiāno Amodio)
Fourteen-year-old daughter of the former boss and current leader of the Cristiano family. She uses her family's resources to help Twilights in need. She runs the "Bastard" nightclub and her associates and de facto protectors are Marco Adriano (who has superhuman strength) and Galahad Woeher (a Twilight).
Sir Gina Paulklee
Voiced by: Yoshiko Sakakibara (Japanese); Clarine Harp (English)
Gina Paulklee (ジーナ・パウルクレイ, Jīna Paurukurei)
Referred to as 'Sir' by her subordinates, she is a Twilight and head of the Paulklee Guild, which takes in rogue Twilights and hires them out. Gina believes strongly in the Three Laws that govern Twilights, which are based on Asimov's Three Laws of Robotics: No action can be taken against "normals", obey your master, defend yourself. She is taller than Nic, which is something he comments that he hates.
Ginger
Voiced by: Mikako Komatsu (Japanese); Jamie Marchi (English)
Ginger (ジンジャー, Jinjā) is a highly ranked Twilight and member of the Paulklee Guild. She is Gina Paulklee's right hand. She is a rank S/5 Twilight.
Doug
Voiced by: Hiroyuki Yoshino (Japanese); Greg Ayres (English)
Doug (ダグ, Dagu) is a rank A/0 Twilight, like Nic. He worked for the Paulklee Guild and was roommates with Galahad Woeher.
Joel Raveau
Voiced by: Masako Isobe (Japanese); Rachel Robinson (English)
Joel Raveau (ヨエル・ラヴォー, Yoeru Ravō) is an old woman who runs a cigarette shop in Ergastulum, and a frequent customer of the Handymen.
Uranos Corsica
Voiced by: Hideyuki Umezu (Japanese); Greg Dulcie (English)
Uranos Corsica (ウラノス・コルシカ, Uranosu Korushika) is the head of the Corsica Family. He has a large scar on his forehead. He bears an intense dislike toward Twilights.
Constance Raveau
Voiced by: Ami Koshimizu (Japanese); Jad Saxton (English)
Constance Raveau (コンスタンス・ラヴォー, Konsutansu Ravō) is the owner of a gun shop who is on friendly terms with the handymen.

== Media ==
=== Manga ===
The manga, which is written and illustrated by Kohske, was launched in March 2011 in Shinchosha's Monthly Comic @ Bunch magazine. Gangsta. is the author's first manga series, after she debuted in Shōnen Gangan in 2009 with a short story. Viz Media announced in July 2013 that it had acquired the rights to publish Gangsta. in North America, with plans to release a new volume on a tri-monthly basis. The series went on hiatus due to Kohske's health in November 2015. In January 2016, she posted on Twitter that she was preparing to resume the series. The series resumed publication on 20 May 2017.

The manga inspired a spin-off series, titled Gangsta.:Cursed. EP_Marco Adriano, which began serialization in the fourth volume of the Quarterly Comic Go Go Bunch magazine, preceded by a prologue in the third volume, which was published on 9 April 2014. The series is illustrated by Syuhei Kamo. Gangsta.:Cursed. EP_Marco Adriano focuses on mafia staff member Marco Adriano, a character from the original manga. The first collected volume was published on 9 July 2015. In December 2016, Viz Media announced that it had licensed the manga and would release it on 20 December. Go Go Bunch ceased publication in 2018, and the manga's final chapter was featured in the last issue on 9 February 2018. Viz Media announced in April 2016 that it had licensed the series under the title Gangsta.: Cursed.

==== List of volumes ====
The series has been collected into nine tankōbon volumes, all of which have been republished in English. The fifth volume made it onto The New York Times manga best sellers list, ranking at number three.

No.	Original release date	Original ISBN	English release date	English ISBN
1	8 July 2011	978-4-10-771625-5	18 February 2014	978-1-421560-77-9
2	7 January 2012	978-4-10-771646-0	20 May 2014	978-1-421564-53-1
3	9 July 2012	978-4-10-771667-5	19 August 2014	978-1-421564-54-8
4	9 February 2013	978-4-10-771694-1	18 November 2014	978-1-421566-00-9
5	9 October 2013	978-4-10-771719-1	17 February 2015	978-1-421573-48-9
6	9 July 2014	978-4-10-771754-2	19 May 2015	978-1-421579-06-1
7	9 July 2015	978-4-10-771826-6	19 July 2016	978-1-421586-48-9
8	9 May 2018	978-4-10-772081-8	19 March 2019	978-1-974705-57-3
9	7 August 2026	978-4-10-772972-9	—	—

===== Gangsta.: Cursed =====
No.	Original release date	Original ISBN	English release date	English ISBN
1	9 July 2015	978-4-10-771828-0	20 December 2016	978-1-4215-9054-7
2	9 January 2016	978-4-10-771868-6	16 May 2017	978-1-4215-9132-2
3	8 October 2016	978-4-10-771923-2	17 October 2017	978-1-4215-9581-8
4	9 June 2017	978-4-10-771985-0	15 May 2018	978-1-9747-0028-8
5	9 May 2018	978-4-10-772080-1	18 June 2019	978-1-9747-0156-8

=== Audio drama ===
The manga has been adapted into a series of audio drama CDs, released by Frontier Works, the first of which was released on 21 August 2014. The series was originally intended to end with the third CD, but five have been released as of June 2015. It was announced in November 2015 that the sixth and seventh CDs, scheduled for 25 November 2015 and 27 January 2016, respectively, had been delayed until further notice. They were eventually released in March and May 2016.

No.	Release date
1	21 August 2014
2	29 October 2014
3	24 December 2014
4	29 April 2015
5	24 June 2015
6	23 March 2016
7	25 May 2016

=== Anime ===
An anime adaptation was announced through a wrap-around jacket on the sixth tankōbon volume in Japan. It was later confirmed through the series' official Twitter account for the drama CD and anime project that it would be a TV anime, and would be produced by Manglobe as their final anime television series before succumbing to bankruptcy. The series is directed by Shūkō Murase and Kōichi Hatsumi, with character designs by Yōichi Ueda and music by Tsutchie. Shinichi Inotsume is in charge of series composition, while Koichi Hatsumi serves as series director. Additional crew include Masahiro Kubota (art design), Masatoshi Kai (art direction), Yuuko Saitou (color design), and Shinobu Tsuneki (prop design). Yuuichirou Nagata from Asahi Production serves as the series' director of photography. Tomoki Nagasaka is the series' editor, and Yukio Nagasaki serves as sound director. The cast from the audio drama return to voice their characters in the anime. The opening theme song is "Renegade" by STEREO DIVE FOUNDATION, while the ending theme song, performed by Annabel, is "Country of the Night" (夜の国, Yoru no Kuni).

The series began airing in Japan on 1 July 2015, and was broadcast on Asahi Broadcasting Corporation (ABC), Tokyo MX, TV Aichi, and BS11 in Japan, and was streamed on the Bandai Channel and Niconico. The anime is licensed by Funimation in North America, and was simulcast on their website as it aired in Japan. Funimation also streamed an English dub of the series. Crunchyroll licensed the series for simulcast in France and French speaking territories (Belgium, Luxembourg, Switzerland, Andorra, Monaco, Tunisia, Algeria, Morocco, New Caledonia, and Quebec). AnimeLab licensed the series for simulcast streaming in Australia and New Zealand, and Anime Limited licensed the series for streaming on Viewster in the United Kingdom. The series switched from a Wednesday broadcast date to a Sunday one starting with the fifth episode.

No.	Title	Original release date
1	"Naughty Boys"	1 July 2015
The episode opens with Nic watching as Alex is berated by Barry, her boss, for not earning enough money. Later, while Nic and Worick are dealing with some thugs, they see her being abused by an irate customer. As she walks away, one of them (later revealed to be Nic) tosses her a handkerchief to wipe blood off her face. The two Handymen then meet up with the police officer Chad, who hires them to eliminate Barry's gang, which has been encroaching on mafia turf. Before they leave, Nic asks if they can take a trophy. Worick then meets up with Alex, who asks him to thank Nic for the handkerchief, and Worick tells her that they have been hired to kill her boss. Nic is then seen attacking the gang, and Worick shows up in time to finish off Barry. Alex shows up and takes Worick's gun, firing several shots into Barry's body in a fit of despair as she's relieved to no longer be under his control but is now rudderless. Speaking with Chad afterward, Worick reveals that they have chosen Alex as their trophy. Chad protests, but Nic cows him into acceptance with a display of his superhuman strength. At the end of the episode, Worick asks Alex if she can answer their phone for them while he is out.
2	"Hundemarken"	8 July 2015
Nina arrives at the Handymen's office to deliver Nic's medicine. She tells them that Dr. Theo is being harassed by a "Tag", one of the people like Nic. He and Nina leave for the clinic, but Worick spots some suspicious characters and stays behind. Using Alex as a distraction, he manages to dispose of them. Meanwhile, the Tag and some other men are pressuring Dr. Theo to join their organization. They begin to threaten Nina, and are surprised when she arrives unharmed with Nic. Nic and the Tag then begin to fight, with Nic claiming that he can take him down in three minutes. Worick begins to explain the concept of Tags to Alex, but they are interrupted by Nic's fight as he defeats his rival. Afterward, Chad arrives, and berates them for the problems they have caused. Alex asks Nina if she is afraid of Nic, and Nina says she is not: She says Alex is because she doesn't know about Twilights. Elsewhere, the wounded Twilight that Nic fought is killed by an unknown person for failing to complete his job.
3	"Ergastulum"	15 July 2015
Worick wakes up from a dream of Nic killing his father. Since Worick has to work his other job, Alex and Nic leave to make deliveries for Dr. Theo. Nic explains to Alex that Worick is a gigolo. While making a delivery to Joel, Alex sees a newspaper featuring an article about the killing of the Arcangelo family twenty-two years ago and the kidnapping of their youngest son. Worick then joins them after finishing with his customer. They make a delivery to Monroe, who asks Nic to come back to the mafia, but Nic refuses. Next they deliver a batch of Twilight drugs to the madam of the brothel where Worick used to work. Before they leave, Alex sees Nic in a room with a mysterious woman. The next day, Worick and Alex talk about his past and his job as a gigolo. The episode ends with both Nic and Worick having a flashback to their childhood.
4	"Nonconformist"	22 July 2015
Chad summons Nic and Worick to the police station to help identify a pile of mangled bodies found in District 6. Worick identifies them using his photographic memory. Chad then receives a call from Monroe, who asks him to send the Handymen over to help in a gang war he is involved in. Monroe and his men are then attacked by a knife-wielding Twilight of the same rank as Nic, who kills many of them. Nic arrives to fight the Twilight, and Monroe asks his men if they want to place bets on who will win. Worick and Nic's backstory is interspersed with the events of the episode, showing Nic being hired as a mercenary bodyguard for Worick, who is at first outraged that his bodyguard is disabled while the rest of his family's bodyguards are not. However, he soon comes to empathize with Nic. Meanwhile, Alex hallucinates Barry's bloody and animate corpse when faced with the dilemma of staying with the Handymen or living on her own.
5	"Sanctions"	2 August 2015
The episode begins with a flashback to young Worick with a client, juxtaposed with a newscaster talking about the state of affairs in Ergastulum and the Three Laws which are about to take effect. Worick runs back to Nic to share his earnings and to tell him about a café that serves Twilights where they can eat, but is stunned to find Nic crouched and bleeding in an alley. Chad tends to Nic's wounds. In the present, Ginger, assistant to Gina Paulklee of the Paulklee Guild, reports to her boss that Doug has taken a job outside of the Guild's jurisdiction. Worick interrogates a mercenary behind the attack on Monroe. Doug meets his match in Nic, who has overdosed on Celebrer to dull pain. Monroe recalls an attack by a C/3 Twilight (possibly a young Nic) who destroyed his estate and decimated his staff. Worick reports that the Corsicans are making a move. Delico, Monroe's D/0 Twilight, saves Monroe from Doug. Worick tries to stop Nic to keep him from overextending himself, but before he can, Ginger and Gina show up. Gina explains to Nic that the Three Laws have to be observed or Ergastulum will fall apart. She shoots Nic and Doug with Celebrer "downers". Alex, who was studying the sign language book and watching the rain, sees a shadowy figure, which is revealed to be Barry. The sound of heavy footsteps on the stairs has her cowering on the floor wondering how it could be that he survived being shot. Worick drags Nic and Doug to Dr. Theo's clinic and calls Alex, but she fails to answer.
6	"Thorn"	9 August 2015
While interrogating a henchman, Worick learns that Uranos Corsica doesn't want to kill Monroe; he only wants access to the Celebrer-supplying Cristiano Family that he protects. Monroe holds a funeral for the men killed by Doug. Meanwhile, Nina and Worick discuss Nic's injuries as he lies unconscious at the clinic. When Nic awakens, Worick tells him that the body dump discovered in episode four were all Twilights; one of them was the Tag that Nic had fought in episode two. When Worick returns to the office, he finds Dr. Theo there; Theo tells him that Alex is likely suffering from withdrawal from drugs given to her by Barry, which have caused her hallucinations. Searching for Alex, Worick finds her in the alley, where she fails to recognize him and mistakes him for a customer. When she continues to hallucinate Barry, Worick head-butts her to bring her to her senses. In a flashback to their childhood, Worick begins to teach Nic to write. When he asks how Nic got a bruise on his arm, Nic replies that he fell down. Later, Nic and the other mercenaries are dispensed to put down anti-Twilight riots outside Ergastulum. While retrieving the sign language book that Worick gave him, Nic is almost hit by a hand grenade. He returns the damaged book to Worick. Noticing an injury that Worick's father gave him, Nic asks what happened, and Worick says that he fell down.
7	"Birth"	16 August 2015
Worick wakes up from a dream about the time that he learned that Nic is a Twilight, and Alex comforts him. Meanwhile, Chad arrives at Theo's clinic and informs Doug that he is in trouble with the Guild. Theo tells Chad that the Twilight bodies found in District 6 were likely killed by other Twilights. The Four Fathers gather to discuss the recent string of Twilight killings, including another batch of bodies that has recently been discovered. Loretta is suspicious of Uranos Corsica, but he vehemently denies his involvement, despite expressing pleasure at the outcome. In a flashback, Worick reveals to Nic that he has purchased Nic's contract from Gaston Brown. Worick's father finds him smoking, and presses a lit cigarette into his left eye. Nic sees this and, outraged, kills Worick's father and the rest of the family. Nic is about to kill himself too, but Worick forcibly stops him, telling him that he will have to suffer for what he did before he lets him die. In the present, Worick and Delico meet, both being excluded from the Four Fathers meeting, and Worick contemplates that being killed in the Twilight hunt wouldn't be a bad way for Nic to die. In the end of the episode, Nic and Alex pass the two Twilight killers in an alleyway, and Nic, seemingly recognizing them, grins.
8	"Evening Dress"	23 August 2015
The episode begins with the handymen performing repairs on Constance Raveau's shop after a shoot-out, and Worick invites Alex to a soiree hosted by the Cristianos at the Bastard nightclub. While talking with Constance, Alex suddenly remembers that she has a younger brother who she had forgotten, and wonders how that could be. She then begins to hallucinate Barry, before being calmed by Nic. Meanwhile, an unknown man arrives at the East Gate of Ergastulum. The Handymen arrive at the Cristiano nightclub, where they are greeted by Loretta and her two bodyguards, Marco Adriano and Galahad Woeher. As the party gets under way, Nic and Worick leave to help Twilights who are being chased by anti-Twilight rioters. The party is revealed to be an attempt to gather the Twilights together in order to protect them. Meanwhile, Galahad and Loretta coerce Alex into singing for the gathered Twilights. The mysterious man hears her singing, but is turned away at the door. As the song ends, Nic and Worick successfully escort the last of the Twilights to safety. Meanwhile, the two Twilight killers from the previous episode prepare to take action.
9	"Siblings"	30 August 2015
Ivan Glaziev, one of Monroe's henchmen and an anti-Twilight sympathizer, kidnaps a Twilight's daughter and forces him to attack Loretta at her party. When Loretta attempts to question him, he is killed by the sudden arrival of the boy Mikhail, one of the two Twilight killers who begins slaughtering the guests and taking their tags. Galahad and Marco engage Mikhail, and manage to stop him before the other Twilight killer, Erica, arrives on Ivan's invitation and renews the slaughter. Outside, Worick fires a signal flare to summon help. Nic arrives just in time to save Loretta from Erica whom he realizes is Delico's sister. The exceeding fast and powerful Erica is about to kill Nic but she is stopped by the arrival of Ginger from the Paulklee Guild who saw Worick's signal. Erica and Mikhail, realizing they are outnumbered, decide to retreat. They meet up with Ivan and Uranos Corsica, who is revealed to be a member of Esminets, the group behind the Twilight killings. As the episode ends, Corsica welcomes Alex's younger brother, Emilio.
10	"Land of Confusion"	13 September 2015
Dr. Theo treats Nic for his serious injuries in the fight with Erica and warns him about overdosing on Celebrer. Meanwhile, Worick visits the morgue where he helps identify all those killed in the attack on the Bastard. They include some of the prostitutes and mother of the baby Loretta now is caring for. Connie arrives to see Marco who was also wounded, and gives Alex a key, saying only that the next battle would be much greater. Meanwhile, the Paulklee Guild suspect an attack and send Doug to investigate with some scouts. They encounter the hunter Sig, one of the younger members of the Third Destroyers, who launches a lightening fast attack with her long-handled axe. Doug only escapes with his life after Ed sacrifices himself to save him. She is then joined by an unknown person.
11	"Absence"	20 September 2015
At the Monroe mansion, Delico sets out and find his sister and Yang offers to help him. Meanwhile, the hunters set off smoke bombs so it is easier to detect Twilights because of their distinctive scent. Sig and Colt begin a murderous path towards the Paulklee Guild killing all Twilights in their path and Doug is severely wounded. They cut their path to Sir Gina Paulklee at her headquarters, but are called back by Emelio, although not until they identify themselves as Tretiy Esminets, agents of Uranos Corsica. Delico and Yang encounter a young Twilight seeking revenge for Sig killing his sister, and they offer to help. Galahad walks through the aftermath of the Twilight slaughter and encounters a fatally injured Doug who gasps a message with his dying breaths and hands the older Galahad his tags before dying. Back in town the hunter Beretta stops outside Granny Joel's closed shop looking for cigarettes when Connie arrives and offers to get them for her. As Connie goes to give them to her, Beretta grabs Connie by the wrist and tells her she has a familiar scent.
12	"Odds and Ends"	27 September 2015
It starts raining heavily as Two of Loretta's men call at the Handymen's office and ask Nic to go with them to protect their boss, also mentioning that Connie is missing. At the Monroe mansion, Worick discusses with Chad the recent events and Ivan's suspicious appearance at the same time. Suddenly the hunter Striker arrives outside the building. As he fights his way in, Worick and Miles prepare to be the final barrier between him and Munroe. They prepare a trap, but Striker is more than a match for them and stabs Worick in the chest, although not before he manages to inject Striker with a sedative. Still conscious, Striker throws Worick out of the third floor window. Delico and Yang arrive at Granny Joel's shop looking for Connie, but do not find her. At the Monroe mansion Worick lies wounded on the grass in the rain, wondering about the choices he has made.

==== Home video ====
The first two episodes were released on Blu-ray/DVD on 25 September 2015, with each further two episodes originally scheduled to be released once a month, followed by the complete box set on 24 February 2016. Starting with the third volume, however, the home video releases were delayed until further notice. The releases were finally resumed 16 months after the original delay, with the third volume released on 24 March 2017 and the sixth and final volume released simultaneously with the complete set on 23 June 2017.

Product	Episodes	Blu-ray / DVD artwork	Bonus features	Audio commentary	BD / DVD release date
Vol. 1	1	Kohske	Original comic by Kohske	Junichi Suwabe (Worick), Kenjiro Tsuda (Nic), Mamiko Noto (Alex)	25 September 2015
Vol. 1	2	Kohske	Original comic by Kohske	Suwabe, Tsuda, Noto, Akira Mikami, Yuki Midori	25 September 2015
Vol. 2	3	Kohske	Original comic	Suwabe, Tsuda, Noto	28 October 2015
Vol. 2	4	Kohske	Original comic	Suwabe, Tsuda, Noto, Tetsuo Kanao (Chad), Kaito Ishikawa (Cody Balfour)	28 October 2015
Vol. 3	5	Kohske	Original comic		24 March 2017
Vol. 3	6	Kohske	Original comic		24 March 2017
Vol. 4	7				21 April 2017
Vol. 4	8				21 April 2017
Vol. 5	9				26 May 2017
Vol. 5	10				26 May 2017
Vol. 6	11				23 June 2017
Vol. 6	12				23 June 2017
Blu-ray Box	1–12				23 June 2017

=== Novel ===
An original novel based on the series and written by Jun'ichi Kawabata was released on 1 August 2015 as part of Shinchosha's Shincho Bunko nex series.

== Reception ==
Rebecca Silverman, reviewing the first English volume for the Anime News Network, gave it an overall score of B+, giving the story a B+ grade and the art a grade of B. She was positive toward the characters and story, commenting that the author "makes some interesting choices with her characters", but felt the art was occasionally subpar, pointing out an image that was reused three times, and commented that the name of the city "sounds like some sort of stomach disorder". Reviewing the second volume, she remarked on improvements in the author's art style and praised the development of Worick, but criticized Alex's reduced presence. She was also positive toward the third volume, writing "Gangsta. is so gritty that you kind of feel like brushing off your skin after reading it, but it's that way with a purpose that is starting to become clear and it's going to feel like a really long wait for volume four".

Reviewing the first three episodes of the anime, Gabriella Ekens stated that it was "a languid execution of a promising story". She also criticized the series' musical score and animation. She stated, however, that she was looking forward to the show, and that "its flaws are as intriguing as its strengths."
