= Qzil.la =

Japanese animation studio

- Type: Kabushiki gaisha
- Industry: Japanese animation
- Founded: February 2021; 5 years ago
- Founder: Shun Fukudome
- Headquarters: Kanda-Jinbōchō, Chiyoda, Tokyo, Japan
- Key people: Shun Fukudome (president & CEO)
- Owner: Comicsma
- Number of employees: 36
- Website: https://qzil.la

Qzil.la (Qzil.la株式会社) is a Japanese animation studio founded in February 2021 and owned by Comicsma.

== Works ==
=== Anime television series ===
Year	Title	Director	Eps.	Source	Ref.
2026	Champignon Witch (co-animated with Typhoon Graphics)	Yōsuke Kubo	12	Manga	
2026	My Ribdiculous Reincarnation (co-animated with S.o.K)	Yasufumi Soejima	12	Light novel	
2027	Mera×Death: The Unusual Love Between Me and the Grim Reaper (co-animated with Studio Keel)	Kenta Kushitani	TBA	Video game	
2027	Sekiro: No Defeat	Kenichi Kutsuna	8	Video game	
2027	Go with the Clouds, North-by-Northwest	Takashi Sano (chief); Yōsuke Kubo	TBA	Manga	

=== ONAs ===
Year	Title	Director	Eps.	Source	Ref.
2023–2024	Kuromi's Pretty Journey (co-animated with Imagica Infos and Studio Nanahoshi)	Domeshi; Takayuki Abe	21	Media franchise	
2024–2025	Enter the Garden (co-animated with Imagica Infos)	Various	3	Original	

=== Video games ===
Year	Title	Publisher	Notes	Ref.
2021	Illusion Connect: Re	Sugargame Network Limited	Commercial	
2022	Guardian Tales	Kakao Games	1st Anniversary promotional video	
2023	Magic: The Gathering Arena	Wizards of the Coast	Eldraine Forest animation trailer	
