= Blue Exorcist season 4 =

Fourth season of the Blue Exorcist anime television series

Blue Exorcist: Beyond the Snow Saga (P1) / The Blue Night Saga (P2)
- Season 4
- Key visual for Beyond the Snow Saga
- No. of episodes: 24 (Note: Beyond the Snow Saga: 12 episodes The Blue Night Saga: 12 episodes)

Release
- Original network: Tokyo MX
- Original release: October 6, 2024 – March 23, 2025

Season chronology
- ← Previous; S3: Shimane Illuminati Saga

Blue Exorcist: Beyond the Snow Saga (Japanese: 青の祓魔師(エクソシスト) 雪ノ果(ゆきのはて)篇, Hepburn: Ao no Ekusoshisuto: Yuki no Hate-hen) and Blue Exorcist: The Blue Night Saga (Japanese: 青の祓魔師(エクソシスト) 終夜(よすが)篇, Hepburn: Ao no Ekusoshisuto: Yosuga-hen) both comprise the fourth season of the Blue Exorcist anime television series, which is based on the manga series of the same name by Kazue Kato. The Beyond the Snow Saga aired from October 6 to December 22, 2024, while The Blue Night Saga aired from January 5 to March 23, 2025, on Tokyo MX and other networks. In October 2025, it was announced that the English dub for Beyond the Snow Saga would make its broadcast television premiere on Adult Swim's Toonami programming block, where it aired from November 9, 2025, to February 1, 2026.

For Beyond the Snow Saga, the opening theme song is "Re Rescue", performed by Reol, while the ending theme song is "Tsurara" (氷柱; lit. 'Icicle'), performed by Yobahi. For The Blue Night Saga, the opening theme song is "Tsūkaku" (痛覚; lit. 'Pain Sensation'), performed by Amazarashi, while the ending theme song is "Overlap" (オーバーラップ), performed by Shiyui.

== Episodes ==
No. overall	No. in saga	Title	Directed by	Written by	Storyboarded by	Original release date	English air date
Beyond the Snow Saga
50	1	"Ambition"; Transliteration: "Yabō" (Japanese: 野望)	Junichi Fujise	Toshiya Ōno	Satoshi Nishimura	October 6, 2024	November 9, 2025
The Knights of the True Cross begin holding discussions among the higher ranks to establish countermeasures to deal with the influx of low and mid-level demons caused by the Illuminati. Soon after this meeting, Rin and the other cram school students are informed by Mephisto that the Exorcism Certification Exams will be held sooner than originally planned due to the immediate demand for more Exorcists. To assist with this change, Arch Knight Lightning is appointed as a new instructor for the cram school. Lighting holds a big class that is eager to learn from him until he drives most of the students away by proclaiming they should become friends with the demons. After class, Lightning gets Rin and Ryuji to help clean his personal living quarters. During this, Ryuji begins struggling with the fact that he has lost sight of his reason for becoming an Exorcist and, inspired by Lightning's efficient summons and death verses, asks that he become his apprentice. Lightning initially declines this as he is unable to get the Kurikara in the process. However, after testing Ryuji in a death verse game, Lightning allows him to work as his assistant in order to pilfer his abilities.
51	2	"Distress"; Transliteration: "Kunō" (Japanese: 苦悩)	Erika Toshimitsu	Seiko Takagi	Satoshi Nishimura	October 13, 2024	November 16, 2025
Yukio starts investigating the true nature of the power that has started manifesting within his eyes. The situations in which this power appears all had one thing in common: they only appear when he is put in life-threatening situations. Yukio puts his own life on the line in a series of dangerous stunts in an attempt to awaken this hidden power. A day earlier, Rin, Konekomaru and Renzo begin studying for the Exorcism Certification Exams without Ryuji, who is out running errands for Lightning. Ryuji eventually meets up with the trio as he expresses his enthusiasm at being able to apprentice under Lightning. The next day, Rin and Shiemi go on a simple mission to exorcise coal tars appearing in an old house. They both end up trapped inside the house's basement, where they slightly express their feelings for each other before Rin busts them out of the basement by using his flames, much to the disarray of their supervising Exorcist, who instructed them not to destroy the building. Suddenly, Rin and Yukio receive a phone call from Mephisto. He informs the brothers that Shura has been missing for the past few days and orders them to locate her.
52	3	"Hometown"; Transliteration: "Furusato" (Japanese: 故郷)	Jungmook Lee	Kakuzō Nanmanji	Masatoshi Hakada	October 20, 2024	November 23, 2025
Mephisto deduces that Shura returned to her hometown of Towada in Aomori Prefecture. He instructs Rin and Yukio to go there and search for her. The brothers arrive in the snow-covered city near the Lake Towada area, where they stay lodging for the night. The next morning, Shura confronts Hachirotaro Okami, a powerful Hydra who claims territory at the lake and its surrounding areas. Initially summoning her because someone was snooping around his territory, Hachiro uses the opportunity to urge Shura to bear a child. When Shura refuses, Hachiro incapacitates her. Rin and Yukio arrive to find the unconscious Shura alone and injured. They bring her back to the lodging, where her injuries quickly heal. Shura awakens and explains to the brothers that her ancestor formed a blood oath with Hachiro where she was to bear a child before dying at age 30 to receive the demon's power. This lineage cycle would continue until it reached Shura herself. Contempt with breaking the cycle and dying in three years without bearing Hachiro a child, Shura tells the boys not to concern themselves with her before falling asleep. As the brothers go outside Shura's room to contact Mephisto, Hachiro kidnaps her.
53	4	"Goodbye to You"; Transliteration: "Sayonara Anata" (Japanese: さよならあなた)	Norifumi Udono	Yūsuke Watanabe	Satoshi Nishimura	October 27, 2024	November 30, 2025
Shura awakens outside to discover Hachiro right in front of her, who begins using his hypnotic powers to control her body. Rin and Yukio arrive to rescue Shura, but Hachiro pushes Rin back and uses his hypnosis to incapacitate Yukio. Hachiro plans to use Yukio and force Shura to conceive a child, but Rin uses his flames on the demon and breaks his control over them. Shura attempts to use her sword to commit suicide, but Hachiro stops her from doing so. Seeing as no party present wants Shura to perish, Yukio proposes to Hachiro that he will assure she conceives by any means necessary if the demon transfers her blood seal onto his own body. Hachiro initially refuses the offer, but agrees after Yukio shows his loyalty to him by seemingly incapacitating Rin with gunfire. As Hachiro begins transferring Shura's seal onto Yukio, he is suddenly ambushed from behind by Rin. As a result, Hachiro's humanoid vessel is destroyed by Rin's flames. Angered by Yukio's deception into undoing Shura's seal, Hachiro reveals his serpentine demon form and kidnaps her again. Renzo arrives to assist the Okumura brothers as Hachiro takes Shura into the icy deep waters of Lake Towada.
54	5	"As If Begging for Tears"; Transliteration: "Nake to Bakari ni" (Japanese: 泣けとばかりに)	Kenya Ueno	Kakuzō Nanmanji	Junichi Sakata	November 3, 2024	December 7, 2025
As Shura sinks into the lake with Hachiro, she remembers the days she spent with Shiro. Meanwhile, Rin, Yukio and Renzo act fast to save Shura, with Rin using his flames to burn open the multiple snake heads of the demon. Hachiro loses his grip on Shura during the assault and she attempts to escape, but the demon recaptures her. Hachiro resurfaces with Shura and confronts Rin and the others, regenerating his heads in the process. As Yukio and Renzo attempt to rescue Shura, Hachiro swats Renzo away and attempts to crush Yukio to death. Shura breaks free from the demon's grasp by using her sword, saving Yukio and declaring her independence from the demon as he gets scorched by Rin's flames. The repeated destruction and regeneration of Hachiro's demon form causes him to devolve into an ordinary snake in both body and mind. Shura asks the brothers to allow Hachiro to escape as reinforcements arrive by daybreak. Shura embraces the brothers for liberating her from Hachiro's blood oath as Renzo reunites with them after getting knocked out during the battle. Yukio collapses from his injuries and is brought back to a hospital at True Cross by Rin and Shura.
55	6	"Awakening"; Transliteration: "Keichitsu" (Japanese: 啓蟄)	Junichi Fujise	Seiko Takagi	Hiroaki Yoshikawa	November 10, 2024	December 14, 2025
Mephisto reveals to Shura that the Illuminati managed to capture Hachiro. Shura threatens to harm Mephisto if he continues to meddle with the Okumura brothers. Later that night, Lightning begins his investigation into the Illuminati with Ryuji. Based on circumstantial evidence, Lightning speculates that the Japan branch of the True Cross Order is somehow directly tied to the Illuminati's founding and the Blue Night incident. The next morning, after receiving Rin's confession, Shiemi worries that she does not understand the difference between romantic love and friendship love. Unable to bear her confusion, Izumo suggests the two have a study sleepover and uses it as a guise to get Shiemi to read a shōjo manga series about romance. After reading it, Shiemi gets a better grasp at the concept of love. She rejects Rin the next morning at school, citing her inadequacy compared to others her age. Despite both having the intention of keeping their relationship as just being friends, Rin takes the rejection hard and is consoled by Konekomaru. During this, Ryuji receives a phone call from Lightning. After school, Lightning takes Ryuji with him to visit the Southern Cross Boys' Monastery, the church where the Okumura brothers were raised.
56	7	"Variant Leaves"; Transliteration: "Ikeiyō" (Japanese: 異形葉)	Erika Toshimitsu	Toshiya Ōno	Satoshi Nishimura	November 17, 2024	December 21, 2025
Lightning and Ryuji visit the monastery to get a firsthand account of what occurred during the Blue Night. Lightning discovered the three monks living there formerly held positions at the Cross True Japan branch. Lightning threatens to kill one of the monks, named Tadashi Misumi, if he does not divulge information. Ryuji cools Lightning down as Tadashi reveals that his former position was an Elixir researcher at Section 13. Tadashi suddenly dies due to breaking his Morinath contract. With this information, the pair head directly to Mephisto to demand an explanation. Instead, Mephisto points them towards a secret entrance for Section 13, where they discover the site was used to conduct illegal cloning experiments. Mephisto summons them back to himself to reveal the origins of Section 13. Hundreds of years ago, strong demons began gaining physical bodies. However, these bodies would deteriorate over time as its cell cycle began failing. Lucifer, who was inflicted with such a body, initially desired to destroy the world for its unfairness towards him. However, Mephisto convinced Lucifer to allow him to build a research facility to create him a new body. From this facility, the researchers would end up accidentally creating Satan's physical body.
57	8	"Happy (Merry Xmas) Birthday!"; Transliteration: "Happī (Meri Kuri) Bāsudē!" (Japanese: ハッピー（メリクリ）バースデー！)	Yūsuke Shintani	Yūsuke Watanabe	Satoshi Nishimura	November 24, 2024	January 4, 2026
As the investigation duo depart Mephisto, Lightning makes his way through Vatican headquarters to visit Azazel, a demon who was a member of the original Grigori. The next morning at school, it is revealed that Shiemi has suddenly declined to take the Exorcist Certification Exams and intends on leaving the cram school. Despite blindsiding her friends with this news, Shiemi displays her enthusiasm about their upcoming Christmas / birthday party during winter break and promises she will still attend regular classes. Rin and the group begin to grow concerned that Shiemi's sudden reversal means she is dying. Shiemi assigns everyone into groups of two for planning and gathering of the party. On Christmas day, they all celebrate at the boys' dormitory. Following the festivities, Rin confronts Shiemi and asks her if she is dying, to which she adamantly denies but assures him that she will still support them. That night at the dormitory, Rin and Yukio convene together as Shura joins the brothers to share a story about the time she met their mother, regarding her as a beautiful and kind person. As they go to bed, the brothers discuss whether they both want to discover more about their mother's past.
58	9	"Congratulations"; Transliteration: "Kotobuki" (Japanese: 寿)	Norifumi Udono	Kakuzō Nanmanji	Hiroaki Yoshikawa	December 1, 2024	January 11, 2026
Yukio wants to discover the truth behind their births, while Rin believes there is no reason to know. Rin's opinion agitates Yukio as he gives up on the conversation and heads back to sleep. A week later around New Year's Eve, Rin, Yukio and the Exwires head to Kyoto to attend the wedding of Juzo and Mamushi. As Yukio seemingly behaves normally, Rin senses something is off with him. Elsewhere, Lightning resumes his search for the truth behind Section 13 as he confronts Drac Drăgulescu, a man whose name has come up repeatedly during his investigation. Lightning directly accuses Drac of conspiring with the Illuminati and discovers markings around his neck which appear to indicate he has bypassed his Morinath contract. Back at the wedding ceremony, Ryuji steps into the hallway to take a call from Lightning as Yukio confronts him and points his gun towards his head. Yukio threatens Ryuji to spill all the information he knows regarding his and Rin's births. Becoming aware of what he has done, Yukio backs off and attempts to downplay his actions as he gets chastised by Renzo. The wedding is suddenly interrupted by televised reports of a giant cyclops demon attacking Ikebukuro.
59	10	"In the Falling Snow"; Transliteration: "Chiru Yuki no Naka de" (Japanese: 散る雪の中で)	Jungmook Lee	Seiko Takagi	Hiroyuki Yano	December 8, 2024	January 18, 2026
The Exorcists depart for Ikebukuro to battle the cyclops. Shura is assisted by Lightning and able to use her katana, temporarily reinforced by a high-level ice demon, to kill it. As a result of the demon's rampage, a cenotaph which sealed away shadow demons was damaged, causing many of them to escape. The Exorcists advance to eliminate the shadows. During the battle, Lightning gets arrested by Arc Knight Osceola Redarm for his earlier assault on Drac. Before being escorted, Lightning slips away a thumb drive and covertly gives its password to Yukio, who uses it in hopes of discovering the truth behind his and Rin's births. Yukio instead discovers that the True Cross Order has been secretly conducting experiments on humans, which sends him into a moral spiral. Yukio is allowed to depart the battlefield early in the morning and decides to go to Shiemi's house, who discovers him outside and invites him in. As Shiemi shares how Rin is worried about him, Yukio snaps and leaves. As he walks down a snowy alley, Yukio reflects on his failure to get stronger and attempts suicide using his gun. However, Satan prevents this by activating the flames within Yukio's eyes.
60	11	"Beyond the Snow"; Transliteration: "Yuki no Hate" (Japanese: 雪の果て)	Erika Toshimitsu & Jungmook Lee	Toshiya Ōno	Junichi Sakata	December 15, 2024	January 25, 2026
Mephisto is summoned to the Japanese prime minister's office for a private late-night meeting, where he pushes the minister to publicly acknowledge the existence of demons to avoid a public relations disaster. The next morning, Shiemi and Ryuji inform Rin of Yukio's current mental state. Meanwhile, the prime minister organizes a press conference where he plans to inform the country about demons alongside the True Cross Japan branch. During the conference, Yukio confronts Mephisto and demands to know the truth regarding his inherence of Satan's powers. Mephisto refuses Yukio's demands as he goes up to the podium. Angered by his response, Yukio unholsters his gun and aims it at Mephisto just before he gets shot in the head by an unknown third party. Initially believed to be the gunman, Yukio is detained as Mephisto is forced to undo his spacetime freeze of the man-made Gehenna Gate to save his physical body, causing the numerous demons around the gate to scatter onto the world. Yukio is taken by the True Cross Order to a holding cell for hiding his inheritance of Satan's powers. Upon hearing the news, Rin and the other Exwires orchestrate a rescue operation to retrieve Yukio.
61	12	"Parting"; Transliteration: "Ketsubetsu" (Japanese: 決別)	Yūsuke Shintani	Toshiya Ōno	Satoshi Nishimura	December 22, 2024	February 1, 2026
Rin and the Exwires successfully break Yukio out of his holding cell. However, Yukio turns on his brother and explains that the True Cross Order is no different than the Illuminati, even creating their own opposition. Suddenly, Renzo is hoisted down on an Illuminati helicopter, revealing that Yukio has accepted Lucifer's offer to join their organization. Rin uses the Kouma Sword in an attempt to stop Yukio, however his brother's eyes break the sword in half as Satan uses them to communicate his own goals. Yukio leaves with Renzo, vowing to get stronger and surpass his brother. As a result of breaking the sword, Rin suffers the full force of his demonic heart's flames and his human body is initially incinerated. He manages to overcome this and gets resurrected, causing his demonic features to become more prominent. Rin's Exwire friends witness his rebirth, however they quickly realize that he is not in control of himself. As Rin radiates the full force of his flames, Shiemi successfully gets him to regain self-control from his demon counterpart. Rin loses consciousness and awakens in Mephisto's bedroom, joining the demon out on his balcony and demanding to know the entire truth about his birth.
The Blue Night Saga
62	1	"Shiro and Yuri"; Transliteration: "Shīrō to Yuri" (Japanese: 獅郎とユリ)	Junichi Fujise	Toshiya Ōno	Hiroyuki Yano	January 5, 2025	TBA
63	2	"Truth"; Transliteration: "Shinjitsu" (Japanese: 真実)	Jungmook Lee & Yūsuke Shintani	Kakuzō Nanmanji	Taizo Yoshida	January 12, 2025	TBA
64	3	"Alone"; Transliteration: "Hitoribotchi" (Japanese: 一人ぼっち)	Norifumi Udono	Seiko Takagi	Satoshi Nishimura	January 19, 2025	TBA
65	4	"Satan Awakening"; Transliteration: "Satan Kakusei" (Japanese: サタン覚醒)	Erika Toshimitsu	Yūsuke Watanabe	Junichi Sakata	January 26, 2025	TBA
66	5	"More Important Than the Body"; Transliteration: "Karada Yori Daijinamono" (Japanese: 身体より大事なもの)	Yūsuke Shintani	Daito Inaba	Hiroyuki Yano	February 2, 2025	TBA
67	6	"If It Weren't for Me"; Transliteration: "Ore Sae Inakereba" (Japanese: 俺さえいなければ)	Junichi Fujise	Kakuzō Nanmanji	Satoshi Nishimura	February 9, 2025	TBA
68	7	"The Night Before"; Transliteration: "Zen'ya" (Japanese: 前夜)	Jungmook Lee, Yūsuke Shintani & Erika Toshimitsu	Seiko Takagi	Junichi Sakata	February 16, 2025	TBA
69	8	"The Blue Night"; Transliteration: "Aoi Yoru" (Japanese: 青い夜)	Norifumi Udono	Daito Inaba	Satoshi Nishimura	February 23, 2025	TBA
70	9	"Fight to the Death"; Transliteration: "Shitō" (Japanese: 死闘)	Erika Toshimitsu	Yūsuke Watanabe	Satoshi Nishimura	March 2, 2025	TBA
71	10	"Light"; Transliteration: "Hikari" (Japanese: 光)	Yūsuke Shintani & Jungmook Lee	Kakuzō Nanmanji	Junichi Sakata	March 9, 2025	TBA
72	11	"Promise"; Transliteration: "Yakusoku" (Japanese: 約束)	Junichi Fujise	Seiko Takagi	Hiroyuki Yano	March 16, 2025	TBA
73	12	"Thank You"; Transliteration: "Arigatō" (Japanese: ありがとう)	Kanji Wakabayashi	Toshiya Ōno	Satoshi Nishimura	March 23, 2025	TBA

== Home media release ==
=== Japanese ===
Aniplex (Japan – Region 2/A)
Vol.		Episodes	Release date	Ref.
Beyond the Snow Saga	1	1–6	January 29, 2025	
Beyond the Snow Saga	2	7–12	February 26, 2025	
The Blue Night Saga	1	1–6	April 23, 2025	
The Blue Night Saga	2	7–12	May 28, 2025	

=== English ===
Aniplex of America (North America – Region 1/A)
Title	Episodes	Release date	Ref.
Beyond the Snow Saga	1–12	August 26, 2025	
The Blue Night Saga	1–12	December 9, 2025	
