= Sekiro: Shadows Die Twice =

2019 video game

- Developer: FromSoftware
- Publisher: Activision: JP: FromSoftware
- Directors: Hidetaka Miyazaki; Kazuhiro Hamatani
- Producers: Yuzo Kojima; Takahiro Yamamoto
- Designers: Masaru Yamamura; Yuki Fukuda
- Programmer: Yoshitaka Suzuki
- Composer: Yuka Kitamura
- Platforms: PlayStation 4; Windows; Xbox One; Stadia
- Release: PS4, Windows, Xbox One; 22 March 2019; Stadia; 28 October 2020
- Genre: Action-adventure
- Mode: Single-player

Sekiro: Shadows Die Twice (Note: Japanese: セキロ：シャドウズ ダイ トゥワイス, Hepburn: Sekiro: Shadōzu Dai Tuwaisu) is a 2019 action-adventure game developed by FromSoftware. It was released in Japan by FromSoftware and internationally by Activision for the PlayStation 4, Windows and Xbox One in March 2019 and for Stadia in October 2020.

Players control Wolf, a shinobi who embarks on a quest to rescue his lord, and becomes embroiled into a conflict for Ashina's fate. The gameplay is focused on stealth, exploration, and combat, with a particular emphasis on boss battles. It takes place in a fictionalized Japan during the Sengoku period and makes strong references to Buddhist mythology and philosophy. Lead director Hidetaka Miyazaki wanted to create a new intellectual property (IP) that marked a departure from their Dark Souls series, wanting to make a Japanese-themed game around shinobi and ninja. Tenchu, as an IP tied to FromSoftware and with that history theme, ended up being the impetus for the project.

Sekiro received acclaim from critics, who praised its gameplay and setting and compared it favorably to FromSoftware's past work, although opinions on its heavy difficulty were mixed. It won several year-end awards, including the Game Award for Game of the Year, and has sold over ten million units as of September 2023.

== Gameplay ==
Screenshot showing the player fighting against one of the game's many bosses, the True Monk

Sekiro: Shadows Die Twice is an action-adventure game played from a third-person view. Compared to FromSoftware's Dark Souls series, the game features fewer role-playing elements, lacks character creation and the ability to level up a variety of stats, and has no real-time multiplayer elements. It does, however, include gear upgrading, special abilities with a prosthetic arm, a skill tree, and limited ability customization. Rather than attacking to whittle an enemy's health points, combat in Sekiro revolves around using a katana to attack their posture and balance instead, as well as deflecting incoming enemy attacks, eventually leading to an opening that allows for a single killing blow.

The game also features stealth elements, allowing players to instantly eliminate or severely damage most enemies if they can get in range undetected. In addition, the player character can use various tools to assist with combat and exploration, such as a grappling hook. If the player character dies, they can be revived on the spot if they have resurrection power, which is restored by defeating enemies, instead of respawning at earlier checkpoints.

== Synopsis ==
During the late Sengoku period, the Ashina clan, led by Kensei Isshin Ashina, seizes a land rich in divine favor, including a foreign deity dubbed the Divine Dragon which can grant immortality through a bloodline dubbed the "Dragon's Heritage" and through the Rejuvenating Waters and its mukade-infested Sediment. During this time, a nameless orphan is adopted by the wandering shinobi Owl, who names the boy "Wolf" and trains him in his ways. As Wolf grows up, Owl entrusts him with safeguarding the young lord Kuro, the last of the Dragon's Heritage line.

Two decades later, the now-elderly Isshin is on his deathbed and the weakened Ashina is besieged by the forces of the Interior Ministry to finish the unification of Japan. Desperate to save his clan, Isshin's adoptive grandson, Genichiro, seeks Kuro to use his blood to create an immortal army. Disagreeing with his grandson's methods, Isshin has his private physician, Emma, warn Wolf so the two can flee. However, Genichiro confronts them and defeats Wolf in a duel, severing his left arm and capturing Kuro. Wolf is saved by a man called the Sculptor, who gifts him a prosthetic arm. To rescue Kuro, Wolf assaults Ashina Castle, where he meets Isshin and is given a new name: "Sekiro". Optionally, Sekiro can revisit his past through meditation using various items he finds; three years ago, Kuro's home was raided by bandits led by the shinobi Lady Butterfly, leading to Owl's apparent death. While Sekiro defeated her, he was fatally stabbed by an unknown assailant and only survived after Kuro shared his blood with him.

Sekiro again duels Genichiro and defeats him this time. However, he survives, having used the Sediment from the Rejuvenating Waters to gain corrupted immortality, and escapes. Afterward, Kuro refuses to flee and instead wants Sekiro to perform the Immortal Severance ritual on him, which would result in his death and eliminate the Dragon's Heritage. Sekiro reluctantly agrees and sets out to collect the necessary materials for the ritual, including a weapon that can kill immortals known as the Mortal Blade from the Divine Child – the sole survivor of experiments with the Rejuvenating Waters. After collecting most of the ritual elements, Sekiro is confronted by Owl, who faked his death in pursuit of the Dragon's Heritage and revealed to be the one who stabbed him three years ago. If Sekiro renounces his loyalty to Kuro on Owl's orders, he fights and kills Emma and Isshin while Owl kills Genichiro. However, Sekiro then becomes corrupted by bloodlust and kills Owl as well while Kuro watches in horror, leading to the Shura ending.

If Sekiro refuses, he kills Owl in combat and enters the divine realm to recover the final ingredient for the ritual from the Divine Dragon itself. Upon returning to the mortal realm, Sekiro discovers that Isshin has passed and Ashina is under attack by the Interior Ministry's troops who have set fire to the castle with rockets and flamethrowers. Fighting through the burning castle, Sekiro eventually finds Kuro under attack by Genichiro, who has retrieved another Mortal Blade. Upon defeat, Genichiro sacrifices himself using the second Mortal Blade to revive Isshin in his prime so he might restore Ashina, a wish that his grandfather attempts to honor despite disagreeing with it. After killing Isshin, depending on the items gathered, three endings are available:

- In the Immortal Severance ending, Sekiro performs the ritual as instructed, killing Kuro and making himself mortal again. Afterward, like the Sculptor before him, Sekiro spends his remaining days carving Buddha statues while keeping his prosthetic to pass on to someone else one day.
- In the Purification ending, Sekiro performs an alternate ritual worked out with Emma's aid which has Sekiro sacrificing himself while freeing Kuro of the Dragon's Heritage. Afterward, Kuro prays at Sekiro's grave with Emma before departing Ashina.
- In the Return ending, Sekiro collaborates with the Divine Child to make her a vessel for the Divine Dragon's power. After defeating Isshin, Sekiro takes the dying Kuro to the Divine Child, who absorbs him into herself. The Divine Child and Sekiro then leave on a journey to return the Dragon's Heritage to its home in the West.

== Development ==
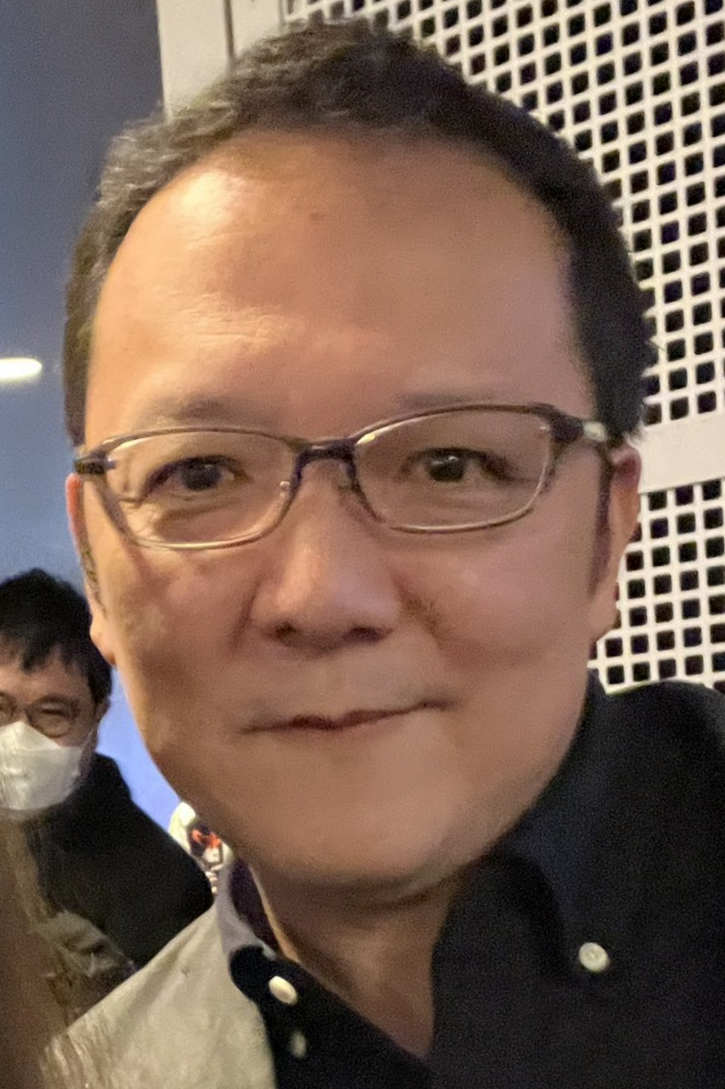
Sekiro was directed by Hidetaka Miyazaki.

Development of Sekiro began in late 2015 following the completion of Bloodborne's downloadable content, The Old Hunters. It was directed by Hidetaka Miyazaki, who had previously worked on the Dark Souls series and Bloodborne. Sekiro draws inspiration from the Tenchu series of stealth-action games developed by Acquire and published by FromSoftware. The team initially considered developing the game as a sequel to Tenchu; however, it quickly outgrew the concept. Miyazaki intended the combat changes to capture the feel of "swords clashing", with fighters trying to create an opening to deliver the fatal strike. He and the team also created the game to be an entirely single-player experience, as they believed multiplayer to have limitations they wanted to avoid. Despite the game taking place during the Sengoku period of real-world Japanese history, no historical people or locations are featured in the game.

The game was revealed via a teaser trailer at the Game Awards 2017 in December, showing the tagline "Shadows Die Twice". The game's full title was revealed to be Sekiro: Shadows Die Twice during Microsoft's press conference at E3 2018. The game was published by Activision worldwide, with FromSoftware self-publishing it in Japan and Cube Game publishing in the Asia-Pacific region. Sekiro's soundtrack was composed by Yuka Kitamura, with some contributions from Noriyuki Asakura. The game was released for PlayStation 4, Windows and Xbox One on 22 March 2019. A collectors edition was also released the same day and included a steelbook case, a figurine of the protagonist, an art book, a physical map of the game's world, a download code for the soundtrack, and in-game coin replicas. A port for Stadia was released in late 2020. On 31 October 2020, a free update was released that added new content to the game, such as new cosmetics for Wolf and a boss rush game mode.

The word "sekirō" (隻狼) is a contraction of "sekiwan no ōkami" (隻腕の狼), which translates as "one-armed wolf." The subtitle "Shadows Die Twice" was initially meant to be used as a slogan for the teaser trailer until Activision requested it be kept for the final name.

To promote the game in South Korea, Yasuhiro Kitao of From Software spoke at a press conference at JW Marriott Dongdaemun Square on March 8, 2019.

== Reception ==
Reception

Aggregate scores
Aggregator	Score
Metacritic	(PC) 88/100 (PS4) 90/100 (XONE) 91/100
OpenCritic	96% recommend (Note: Based on 180 reviews)

Review scores
Publication	Score
Destructoid	9/10
Electronic Gaming Monthly	4/5
Eurogamer	9/10
Famitsu	37/40
Game Informer	9/10
GameSpot	9/10
GamesRadar+	4/5
IGN	9.5/10
PlayStation Official Magazine – UK	9/10
PC Gamer (US)	92/100
USgamer	4/5
VideoGamer.com	10/10

Sekiro received critical acclaim. According to review aggregator website Metacritic, it garnered "universal acclaim" for the PlayStation 4 and Xbox One versions and "generally favorable reviews" for the Windows version. OpenCritic determined that 96% of critics recommend the game. Many critics praised the game's combat for departing from the typical style of FromSoftware's other similar games. In a review for Destructoid, Chris Carter described open combat as "akin to a waltz" and praised the variety of ways the combat could be approached, writing that players had more choices than in Dark Souls or Bloodborne. Brandin Tyrell from IGN praised the game's focus on "split-second swordsmanship", and although "to any Souls veteran, Sekiro's timing-based lock-on combat of strikes and slashes is familiar", the game's "sense of safety" caused the combat to feel "refreshing and new". PC Gamer journalist Tom Senior called the combat "beautiful" and praised the posture system, writing that "instead of chipping down health bars until the enemy keels over, you overwhelm their posture bar with strikes and perfect parries until an opening appears, and then finish with a deathblow". He stated that the system takes "the catharsis" of beating a great boss and "focuses all that emotion into one split second". In a review for the website GameSpot, Tamoor Hussain wrote that the game "rewrites the rules of engagement", stating that, while previous FromSoftware games demanded quick decision-making, Sekiro "pushes these demands further" than ever before. Reviewers also praised the resurrection mechanic, with Carter calling it "genius", and the stealth options, which gave the player freedom without descending into frustration.

The level design was also praised. Particular emphasis was given to the player's increased verticality due to the addition of the grappling hook and a dedicated jump button. Tyrell wrote that the grappling hook "sends ripples throughout the gameplay", writing that "where all previous Soulsborne characters felt rooted firmly to the ground as they trudged down hallways and slowly climbed ladders, Sekiro's level design has permission to be much more vertical". Carter wrote that the hook provided "a more vertical and in some cases more challenging level design from an exploration standpoint". Senior wrote that the game used "large but separate zones rather than a huge connected world" but praised the "many secrets hidden just off the critical path, often reached with the excellent grappling hook, which lets you vault between tree branches and rooftops". The levels themselves were also praised, with Hussain writing that "buildings are placed together to encourage exploration and reconnaissance, with roofs almost touching so that you can leap between them and scope out all angles", with the branching paths "creating that satisfying feeling of venturing into the unknown and then emerging into the familiar".

Reaction to the lack of online multiplayer was mixed. Several reviewers noted that this allowed the game to have a full pause button, which was praised. However, Tyrell noted that he "missed the small notes left by others in the world alerting me to imminent threats or hidden secrets, or that vague sense that danger lurks behind me in the form of an invading player" that defined the experience of playing "Soulsborne" games. He also noticed the "lack of PvP battles, which seem[ed] like a waste of the new emphasis on skill-based swordsmanship" and argued that the deflecting and blocking mechanics would have suited online play.

Similarly to other FromSoftware games, the game's high difficulty level polarised players and journalists. Several reviewers praised the difficulty, with Senior calling it "brutal" but "spectacular". Hussain wrote that the game "punishes you for missteps" and was "suited for people of a certain temperament and with a very specific, slightly masochistic taste in games" but argued that victory was "intense" and "gratifying". Tyrell wrote that the combat had a "steep curve to mastering it" but argued it was "somewhat easier than its predecessors" while still providing the sense of being "the greatest swordsman that ever lived" after tough victories. However, several journalists found it too challenging, with Don Rowe from The Spinoff calling it "infuriating" and writing that he was not having fun after six hours with the game. Several days after the game was released, modders managed to develop mods which would make the game easier by changing the speed of the player's character relative to the game. James Davenport of PC Gamer said that the game's final boss was too difficult for him to beat without the help of the software.

=== Sales ===
On release day, Sekiro drew over 108,000 concurrent players on Steam, the highest for a new game launched during January–March 2019 and the third highest of any Japanese game in the platform's history, behind only Monster Hunter: World and Dark Souls III. Later in March, it had reached over 125,000 concurrent players on Steam, making it one of the most played games on the platform at the time.

In its debut week, Sekiro topped the UK and EMEAA (Europe, Middle East, Africa, Asia) charts, surpassing Tom Clancy's The Division 2. In Japan, the game debuted first, with 157,548 retail units sold in its opening weekend.

Within ten days of its release, over two million units were sold, which rose to over five million by July 2020. As of September 2023, it has sold over 10 million units.

=== Awards ===
The game won several awards, including Game of the Year at the Game Awards 2019, by editors of GameSpot, and by fans in the 2019 Steam Awards.

Year	Award	Category	Result	Ref.
2018	Game Critics Awards	Best of Show	Nominated	
2018	Game Critics Awards	Best Original Game	Nominated	
2018	Game Critics Awards	Best Console Game	Nominated	
2018	Game Critics Awards	Best Action/Adventure Game	Nominated	
2018	Golden Joystick Awards	Most Wanted Game	Nominated	
2018	Gamers' Choice Awards	Most Anticipated Game	Nominated	
2019	Japan Game Awards	Award for Excellence	Won	
2019	Golden Joystick Awards	Ultimate Game of the Year	Nominated	
2019	Golden Joystick Awards	Best Visual Design	Nominated	
2019	The Game Awards 2019	Game of the Year	Won	
2019	The Game Awards 2019	Best Game Direction	Nominated	
2019	The Game Awards 2019	Best Art Direction	Nominated	
2019	The Game Awards 2019	Best Audio Design	Nominated	
2019	The Game Awards 2019	Best Action/Adventure Game	Won	
2019	The Steam Awards	Game of the Year	Won	
2020	23rd Annual D.I.C.E. Awards	Action Game of the Year	Nominated	
2020	23rd Annual D.I.C.E. Awards	Outstanding Achievement in Game Design	Nominated	
2020	20th Game Developers Choice Awards	Game of the Year	Nominated	
2020	20th Game Developers Choice Awards	Best Visual Art	Nominated	
2020	20th Game Developers Choice Awards	Best Design	Nominated	
2020	SXSW Gaming Awards	Video Game of the Year	Won	
2020	SXSW Gaming Awards	Excellence in Gameplay	Nominated	
2020	SXSW Gaming Awards	Excellence in Technical Achievement	Nominated	
2020	SXSW Gaming Awards	Excellence in Visual Achievement	Won	
2020	16th British Academy Games Awards	Best Game	Nominated	
2020	16th British Academy Games Awards	Animation	Nominated	
2020	16th British Academy Games Awards	Game Design	Nominated	
2020	16th British Academy Games Awards	Technical Achievement	Nominated	

== Anime adaptation ==
An anime adaptation, titled Sekiro: No Defeat, was announced at Gamescom 2025. The series is produced by Qzil.la and is set to premiere in January 2027 for eight episodes, with Crunchyroll streaming the series outside of Japan. The three main cast of the game, Daisuke Namikawa (Wolf), Miyuki Satou (Kuro), and Kenjiro Tsuda (Genichiro Ashina), reprise their roles. A theatrical edition of the anime opened in Japanese theaters on 4 September 2026 by Animec.
