= Blue Exorcist season 3 =

Third season of the Blue Exorcist anime television series

Blue Exorcist: Shimane Illuminati Saga
- Season 3
- Key visual for Shimane Illuminati Saga
- No. of episodes: 12

Release
- Original network: Tokyo MX
- Original release: January 7 – March 24, 2024

Season chronology
- ← Previous; S2: Kyoto Saga Next → S4: Beyond the Snow Saga / The Blue Night Saga

Blue Exorcist: Shimane Illuminati Saga (Japanese: 青の祓魔師(エクソシスト) 島根啓明結社(イルミナティ)篇, Hepburn: Ao no Ekusoshisuto: Shimane Iruminati-hen) is the third season of the Blue Exorcist anime television series, which is based on the manga series of the same name by Kazue Kato. Studio VOLN took over from A-1 Pictures as animation producer, with Daisuke Yoshida replacing Koichi Hatsumi as series director. The season aired from January 7 to March 24, 2024, on Tokyo MX and other networks. In August 2025, it was announced that the season's English dub would make its broadcast television premiere on Adult Swim's Toonami programming block, where it aired from August 24 to November 2, 2025.

The opening theme song is "Eye's Sentry", performed by Uverworld, while the ending theme song is "Gakkyū Nisshi" (学級日誌; lit. "School Diary"), performed by Mulasaki-Ima.

== Episodes ==
No. overall	No. in saga	Title	Directed by	Written by	Storyboarded by	Original release date	English air date
38	1	"The World's Astir"; Transliteration: "Zawameku Sekai" (Japanese: ざわめく世界)	Junichi Fujise	Toshiya Ōno	Daisuke Yoshida	January 7, 2024	August 24, 2025
During regular class hours at True Cross Academy, Rin notices fellow classmate Sei Godaiin can also see demons and confronts him about the matter, with the boy telling Rin that he no longer wishes to see them. The next morning, Rin receives a message from Mephisto notifying him that his scheduled execution by the Vatican was delayed and gets invited to a banquet at his living quarters to celebrate this news. Seeking ulterior motives to help Sei out, Rin accepts the banquet invite and confronts Mephisto later that night, before Mephisto suddenly confesses that his real identity is the demon Samael. When Rin attempts to unsheathe his sword on him, Mephisto halts Rin and indicates that he is not an enemy, as he wishes to see humanity prosper since it fascinates him. Already knowing the situation, Mephisto tells Rin he has eyedrops that'll stop Sei from seeing demons and will give it to Rin once he completes a task for him. The next day, Rin and fellow Exwires gather to eliminate a shapeshifting demon that is possessing paintings in the school's art gallery. After successful completion of the task, Mephisto gives Rin the eyedrops to help Sei stop seeing demons.
39	2	"Where Secrets Are"; Transliteration: "Himitsu no Arika" (Japanese: 秘密の在り処)	Jungmook Lee	Toshiya Ōno	Satoshi Nishimura	January 14, 2024	August 31, 2025
Yukio is summoned to an inquiry meeting by the Vatican with all the True Cross Order branch directors present to be questioned about Todo, the mastermind behind the resurrection of the Impure King. At Lewin "Lightning" Light's advice, they bind Yukio to a blood contract to ensure he cannot leak information or else the demon who drafted the paper will hunt him down to kill him. In the morning, Yukio visits Shiemi to help tutor her, all the while questioning whether he actually did inherit Satan's powers. That night, Yukio notifies the Exires about a demon known as "Mayuko of the Toilet", which is causing mischief inside the girl's dormitory bathroom. Since the entity only appears when females enter the room, Shiemi and Izumo are tasked with working together to eliminate it. Izumo fights her conflicting feelings about Shiemi as she manages to rescue her when she gets captured by the demon, exorcising it in the process. Elsewhere in Russia, the True Cross Order discovers a man-made Gehenna Gate being created through a particle accelerator. Mephisto buys the order some time by temporarily freezing spacetime for the gate, with Lightning concluding that the Illuminati is responsible for the gate's formation.
40	3	"True Cross Academy Festival"; Transliteration: "Seijūji Gakuen-sai" (Japanese: 正十字学園祭)	Norifumi Udono	Toshiya Ōno	Satoshi Nishimura	January 21, 2024	September 7, 2025
Lightning's familiars detect three Illuminati spies within the True Cross Order, with one of them residing in the Japan Branch. Shura is ordered to track down the Japan spy. Meanwhile, True Cross Academy prepares for the upcoming school festival. Renzo and Rin attempt to find partners to attend the music festival with, but they are both continually rejected. Rin's luck turns as a few days later Shiemi reveals she has officially become a student at the Academy after passing the school's transfer exam. As Rin attempts to ask Shiemi to the dance however, he discovers that she plans to ask Yukio out. When Shiemi confronts Yukio, he declines, telling her that he is part of the festival's staff. Rin turns to working the onigiri festival stand with Sei, asking Izumo to help out that night, to which she bluffs him. When the customers subside, Rin goes to enjoy the festivities before discovering Shiemi in the crowd and asking her to dance with him. They find Yukio working and ask him to join in dancing with them as well. Elsewhere, Izumo begins feeling guilty for lying and attempts to go work at the onigiri stand before suddenly being confronted by Nemu.
41	4	"Insider"; Transliteration: "Naitsū-sha" (Japanese: 内通者)	Erika Toshimitsu	Toshiya Ōno	Satoshi Nishimura	January 28, 2024	September 14, 2025
Nemu presents a kitsune doll to Izumo which she recognizes as belonging to someone named Tsukumo, with Nemu telling her to follow him. Meanwhile, Arthur and Lightning capture one of the spies hiding among the True Cross Order and learn that the Illuminati is planning to abduct someone during the concurrent festival at True Cross Academy. After receiving this news, Shura gathers the Exwires to search for Izumo. Once arriving in different location, Nemu tells Izumo that he was ordered to keep her safe before the Illuminati arrived, which makes Izumo assume that he is an enemy. Izumo fights Nemu, with both summoning their familiars until Renzo arrives and seemingly rescues her. After using a high-level familiar to incapacitate Nemu, Renzo proceeds to knock Izumo out and is revealed to be the Japan spy. Soon thereafter, top members of the Illuminati and their leader, Lucifer, arrive at the academy as the Exwires run to confront them, knocking out the school's defensive barriers in the process. Using multiple seraphim to broadcast their announcement worldwide, Lucifer declares that the Illuminati will revive Satan in less than a year and battle any faction that opposes them before quickly leaving with Renzo and Izumo.
42	5	"Destiny"; Transliteration: "Unmei" (Japanese: 運命)	Junichi Fujise	Seiko Takagi	Satoshi Nishimura	February 4, 2024	September 21, 2025
Izumo awakens from a dream about her mother and younger sister Tsukumo to find herself in a vacant room all alone. Meanwhile, all True Cross Order branches are thrown into chaos after the Illuminati's declaration of war. Rin, Yukio, and the remaining Exwires depart for Izumo's hometown in Shimane Prefecture in an attempt to retrieve her and Shima. Inside the Illuminati's Far East Laboratory, Shima arrives inside Izumo's room to greet and reintroduce her to the higher-ups, who also bring along her badly injured mother and the organization's doctor, Michael Gedōin. Izumo insists she is not ready for Michael's experimentation, as she was instructed to become an Exorcist capable of Divine Summoning. Michael dismisses Izumo's concerns, informing her that they have since developed a way to force a demon into a host even if the vessel is not ready. Elsewhere, the Exwires arrive in Shimane and spend the day doing reconnaissance at restaurants and the local Inari shrine in an effort to discover the Illuminati's hidden base where Izumo is being held captive. To help with the search, Nemu summons Miketsu, who proceeds to explain the secret backstory of Izumo from five years ago which led to the current situation.
43	6	"I Can't Rely on Anyone"; Transliteration: "Mō Dare mo Tayorenai" (Japanese: もう誰も頼れない)	Hidetoshi Watanabe	Kakuzō Nanmanji	Satoshi Nishimura	February 11, 2024	September 28, 2025
Coming from a long line of Kamiki family shrine maidens for the Inari shrine: Tamamo, Izumo and Tsukumo's mother, serves as the head of the current Kamiki family who must bear the burden of controlling the fox demon ninetails which is sealed within the killing stone. Although Tamamo possesses excellent divine power as shrine maiden, she is a boisterous and irresponsible mother who gave birth to illegitimate children through the shrine's head priest, Soji Inami. One night after talking with Soji and discovering his aversion of their offspring, Tamamo begins to mentally spiral and neglect her duties. Tamamo's decline would lead to the ninetails completely possessing her body. To save her family, Izumo calls the Illuminati, who arrive and capture Tamamo. While Michael conducts experiments on their mother, Izumo and Tsukumo is sheltered in their laboratory until an Illuminati member named Maria Yoshida discovers that they are going to begin experimenting on Tsukumo. Maria gives her up to a private orphanage and informs Izumo that she will help her escape after she retrieves data. However, Michael discovers Maria's betrayal and kills her with an experimental necrotic injection, telling Izumo that she must obey them or else they will find Tsukumo.
44	7	"Hesitation"; Transliteration: "Mayoi" (Japanese: 迷い)	Jungmook Lee	Toshiya Ōno	Satoshi Nishimura	February 18, 2024	October 5, 2025
Back in the present, Izumo is taken to Michael to undergo a medical examination, where she suddenly creates a diversion to escape her captors. Above ground, after learning about Izumo's past and the Illuminati's current grip on the local townspeople from Mike, Rin and the others head to Peace Town Inari, which they believe holds the entrance to the Illuminati's base. Upon witnessing Illuminati guards stationed outside, Yukio initially decides to wait for backup from Mephisto. However, that plan changes once Mike is summoned by Izumo, leading the group to deduce that she is in danger. The Exwire group ambush the guards and charge in, where they discover the building's interior actually houses a shopping mall. Furious about the group's intrusion, Michael unleashes his hoard of zombies into the mall. The group is quickly cornered into the center of the mall by the zombies, where Michael plunges them down underground and into individual holding cells with even bigger zombies. Meanwhile, Izumo encounters Renzo in the laboratory hallways while attempting to flee and prepares to fight him alongside Uke and Mike. Renzo summons Daiitoku, who effortlessly eliminates both of Izumo's familiars despite her desperate attempts at ordering them to vanish beforehand.
45	8	"Determination"; Transliteration: "Kakugo" (Japanese: 覚悟)	Makoto Ōwada	Seiko Takagi	Satoshi Nishimura	February 25, 2024	October 12, 2025
The top brass from the Illuminati gather with Lucifer to discuss the current situation. Lucifer thanks Michael for creating the elixir currently keeping his body stable and tells all present members not to harm Rin, as he could face Satan's wrath if anything were to happen to him. Homare assigns Renzo to keep watch over Michael. After the meeting, Michael discovers that Izumo will almost certainly die if they attempt to transfer ninetails into her. Paranoid over how Lucifer might react to this setback, Michael devises a scheme to kill the Exwires and frame Izumo's death on Rin if the transfer proves to be unsuccessful, placing him in a more favorable position with Lucifer. Michael executes his plan and unleashes his giant zombies onto the group in each of their separated rooms. Konekomaru escapes his room by successfully baiting his zombie into smashing the door back open and retreats back above with help from Kuro. Rin and Shiemi are also able to successfully escape their rooms. Rin uses his flames to bust everyone else still trapped in their rooms out and they all convene together on the rooftop, where Michael announces his presence to the group via loudspeaker from above.
46	9	"Help Me"; Transliteration: "Tasukete" (Japanese: 助けて)	Erika Toshimitsu	Kakuzō Nanmanji	Satoshi Nishimura	March 3, 2024	October 19, 2025
Gedoin explains that the Far East Laboratory is the central hub for his immortality elixir experiments and that he uses the drug-laced food around town to induce tourists so that he may use them as test subjects, exposing the truth behind Peace Town Inari. Gedoin proceeds to unleash a giant doped zombie onto the group. Izumo appears above them, heading to undergo the transplant of ninetails into her body. Rin turns back and goes to save Izumo, but Shima intervenes and temporarily halts him before being pushed back by Rin, who then incapacitates the guards near Izumo. Rin attempts to rescue Izumo but she refuses his assistance, stating she doesn't need anyone's help. Rin is suddenly attacked by Shima and consumed by the zombie. Izumo arrives at Gedoin's laboratory for the transfer, where she is equipped with a special headset device made by the scientist. Izumo performs the ritual dance to lure ninetails out before quickly being overwhelmed by its immense will, causing her to writhe in agony as she becomes possessed by it. Just as Izumo realizes she really does have friends and cries out for help, Rin breaks through the zombie and into the room to rescue her.
47	10	"Friends"; Transliteration: "Nakama" (Japanese: 仲間)	Norifumi Udono	Toshiya Ōno	Ida–Dyne	March 10, 2024	October 19, 2025
Gedoin, angered and impatient with the situation he now finds himself in, unleashes the mall zombies directly into his laboratory to buy himself time. As Yukio and the other Exwires arrive to assist Rin, Izumo begins to be consumed by ninetails' madness, which she is unable to subdue. A now-unpossessed Tamamo awakens and warns ninetails not to harm her daughter's body. A ninetails-possessed Izumo charges at Tamamo, who successfully dodges all of its attacks with her dance before successfully getting the demon to re-enter her body to save Izumo. However, the second transfer proves fatal for both Tamamo and the ninetails as they begin to die. Tamamo tells Izumo that she is her treasure before dying. Meanwhile, Gedoin forces a necromancer demon into his body to fight the Exwires. Izumo discovers that Uke and Mike are actually alive and uses a powerful prayer to incapacitate the demon-possessed Gedoin. The Myoda sect arrive as reinforcements and secure the entire town, forcing the Illuminati to retreat. The next day at the local hospital, Izumo discovers from Nemu that Tsukumo is alive and currently in the care of a loving foster family. The Exwires return home, where they are welcomed back by Noriko.
48	11	"Pink Spider"; Transliteration: "Pinku Supaidā" (Japanese: ピンクスパイダー)	Jungmook Lee	Seiko Takagi	Ida–Dyne	March 17, 2024	November 2, 2025
Before Rin, Yukio and the Exwires return home, Juzo reveals to them that Shima is actually a double agent working under Mephisto, and that only a select few within Myoda were aware of this. One year earlier, Shima received a covert invitation to the Illuminati, which Juzo, Mephisto and a few other Myoda members determined would benefit the True Cross Order if he accepted and operated as their spy, since the Order did not know many details regarding the organization. Back in the present, Shima unexpectedly shows up at cram school, revealing that the Illuminati allowed him to return to True Cross. The Exwires take out their frustration on Shima before they are all suddenly summoned into Mephisto's office. Lighting arrives to get the Exwire's opinions on whether Shima can be trusted or not, to which they all reluctantly agree he can be. Rin claims that Mephisto is the one who cannot be trusted. Lightning leaves and Mephisto dismisses the Exwires for the day after independently getting some thoughts from Yukio and Shima. While on their way out of the building, Shima informs Yukio that he is aware that he had an encounter with Lucifer, which confuses and alarms him.
49	12	"Hidden True Feelings"; Transliteration: "Kakusareta Hon'ne" (Japanese: 隠された本音)	Chika Nenbe	Kakuzō Nanmanji	Junichi Sakata	March 24, 2024	November 2, 2025
Yukio hid the fact that he had a solo encounter with Lucifer inside the Far East Laboratory while battling his giant zombie, where Lucifer informed Yukio that he is aware of his strange eyes, and offers to help him understand them and get stronger if he joins the Illuminati. After rejecting his offer back in the present, Yukio is advised by Shima talk to somebody within True Cross about his predicament. Later, Mephisto arranges for Yukio, Shura and the Exwire crew relax at a spa resort after their recent mission. Yukio initially attempts to evade the vacation but Shura forces him to go, stating that he needs to unwind the most. The next day, they enjoy the day at the spa resort. During this, Rin and Shima get possessed by the three wise monkeys and destroy the water slide over a dispute about getting paired with the girls on the water slide raft. Shura beats them up in anger over damaging the slide and putting Izumo and Shiemi in danger. Yukio apologizes to the spa resort owner and foots the bill to True Cross to cover the damages. Rin notices that Yukio is hiding something, which irritates the jealous brother.

== Home media release ==
=== Japanese ===
Aniplex (Japan – Region 2/A)
Vol.	Episodes	Release date	Ref.
1	1–6	April 24, 2024	
2	7–12	May 29, 2024	

=== English ===
Aniplex of America (North America – Region 1/A)
Vol.	Episodes	Release date	Ref.
Box Set	1–12	December 17, 2024	
