= Ryūsei (given name) =

- Gender: Male

Origin
- Origin: Japanese
- Meaning: Different meanings depending on the kanji used

Ryūsei (written: 竜青, 竜星, 隆聖, 隆成, 流星 or 劉生) is a masculine Japanese given name. Notable people with the name include:

- Ryo Ryusei (竜星 涼; born 1993), Japanese actor
- Ryusei Ashizawa (芦澤 竜誠; born 1995), Japanese kickboxer
- Ryusei Fujii (藤井 流星; born 1993)
- Ryusei Furukawa (1893–1968), Japanese painter
- Ryusei Kawano (河野 竜生; born 1998), Japanese baseball player
- Ryūsei Kishida (岸田 劉生; 1891–1929), Japanese painter
- Ryusei Kumagai (熊谷 龍聖; born 2001), Japanese kickboxer
- Ryūsei Nakao (中尾 隆聖; born 1951), Japanese actor
- Ryusei Nishioka (西岡隆成, born 2003), Japanese trampoline gymnast
- Nishikifuji Ryūsei (錦富士 隆聖; born 1996), Japanese sumo wrestler
- Ryusei Nose (野瀬 龍世; born 2000), Japanese footballer
- Ryusei Ohe (大江 竜聖; born 1999), Japanese baseball player
- Ryusei Okamoto (岡元 竜生; born 1993), Japanese handball player
- Ryusei Sagusa (三枝 龍生; born 1954), Yoshinkan aikido master
- Ryusei Saito (齊藤 隆成; born 1994), Japanese footballer
- Ryusei Shinoyama (篠山 竜青; born 1988), Japanese basketball player
- Ryusei Sugano (菅野 隆星; born 2002), Japanese footballer
- Ryusei Takeoka (武岡 龍世; born 2001), Japanese baseball player
- Ryusei Yamada (山田琉聖; born 2006), Japanese snowboarder
- Ryusei Yamanaka (山中 琉聖; born 2001), Japanese motorcycle racer

== See also ==
- Ryūsei (disambiguation)
