= Nagareboshi =

Nagareboshi (流れ星; 流れ nagare, “flow, stream” + 星 hoshi, “star”), is Japanese for shooting star, may refer to:

- Nagareboshi (Mika Nakashima song), by Mika Nakashima
- Nagareboshi (Misia song), by Misia
- Nagareboshi (TV series), 2010 Japanese television drama

== See also ==
- Ryūsei (disambiguation)
- Shooting star (disambiguation)
