= List of A Certain Magical Index chapters =

The cover of the first volume of A Certain Magical Index published by Square Enix in Japan on November 10, 2007

A Certain Magical Index is a light novel series written by Kazuma Kamachi and illustrated by Kiyotaka Haimura, which was adapted into a manga series written by Kamachi and illustrated by Chuya Kogino. The manga was serialized in the Monthly Shōnen Gangan magazine by Square Enix since April 12, 2007, and had its first tankōbon volume published in Japan by Square Enix under their Gangan Comics imprint on November 10. As of September 11, 2026, a total of 34 volumes have been published in Japan. Yen Press licensed the manga for English publication in North America on October 10, 2014, and published the first volume on May 19, 2015.

== Main series ==
=== Volume list ===
No.	Original release date	Original ISBN	English release date	English ISBN
1	November 10, 2007	978-4-7575-2157-5	May 19, 2015	978-0-316-30222-7
1. "Imagine Breaker Boy" (幻想殺しの少年, "Imajin Bureikā no Shōnen"); 2. "The Girl Who's Called Index" (少女の字は禁書目録, "Shōjo no Na wa Indekkusu"); 3. "The Sorcerer" (魔術師, "Majutsushi"); 4. "Reflection of the Moon" (水面の月, "Minamo no Tsuki"); 5. "End of Cancer, Pointing to the Western Direction" (巨蟹宮の終わり 方位は西方, "Kaniza no Owari, Hōi wa Seihō")
At night in Academy City, Toma Kamijo meets the third most powerful Level 5 esper Mikoto Misaka at a bridge after saving her from delinquents inside a restaurant. The following morning, Toma finds a hungry nun hanging on his dormitory's balcony. She introduces herself as Index from the Church of England. Index and Toma then engage in a debate about the existence of magic and his right hand's power called "Imagine Breaker" which can negate any supernatural abilities. Afterward, Index leaves as she is being pursued by magicians seeking the 103,000 grimoires in her head. After attending his supplementary lessons and encountering Mikoto again, Toma finds a wounded Index in front of his room when magician Stiyl Magnus showed up to retrieve her. Stiyl finds his magic attacks useless against Toma's Imagine Breaker and summons a fiery creature called "Innocentius". Toma manages to defeat Stiyl after destroying the runes surrounding the dormitory's floor, which keeps the creature alive. He later brings Index to his homeroom teacher Komoe Tsukuyomi for assistance in healing her. The next day, a recovering Index introduces Toma to her religion.
2	June 10, 2008	978-4-7575-2299-2	July 21, 2015	978-0-316-30506-8
6. "Shadow Under the Moon" (月下閃影, "Gekka Sen'ei"); 7. "Index of Necessarius" (必要悪の教会の禁書目録, "Nesesariusu no Indekkusu"); 8. "Limit" (制限時間, "Rimitto"); 9. "Necklace" (首輪, "Kubiwa"); 10. "The End of the Girl of the Index" (禁書目録の少女の結末, "Kinsho Mokuroku no Shōjo no Hatsumatsu")
While heading to a public bath with Index, Toma meets magician Kaori Kanzaki. As the two fight, Kaori reveals that she and Stiyl are friends with Index and how her memory is being erased every year to protect the grimoires in her head. Three days after the battle, an injured Toma wakes up back inside Komoe's apartment with Index taking care of him and panics since he learns from Kaori that Index's memories need to be erased today. Afterward, Stiyl and Kaori arrive to prepare the ceremony required for the erasure of Index's memories. Toma left them and calls Komoe for information about memory capacity since he also learns that Index can only use 15% of her brain for unwanted memories while the remaining 85% is reserved for the grimoires. Komoe tells him that a human brain can store a huge amount of information for up to 140 years. With the newfound knowledge, Toma rushes back into the apartment and convinces the two magicians to give him time in saying a farewell message to Index. He then finds a hidden spell to be the cause of her predicament in her throat and negates it using the Imagine Breaker, resulting in her activating her defense mechanism called "John's Pen". A fight between the two ensues until Toma manages to save Index with the help of Stiyl and Kaori. The after-effect of John's Pen called "Feather of Light" causes Toma's memories to be erased instead, subsequently knocking him down. In a hospital the following day, Index visits Toma upon hearing about his memory loss. He chooses to hide it from her.
3	November 22, 2008	978-4-7575-2427-9	October 27, 2015	978-0-316-34592-7
11. "Mikoto Misaka" (御坂美琴, "Misaka Mikoto"); 12. "Younger Sister" (妹, "Imōto"); 13. "Strongest Power User" (最強の超能力者, "Saikyō no Chōnōryokusha"); 14. "Sisters" (妹達, "Shisutāzu"); 15. "Report, Part 1" (報告書①, "Repōto 1")
Back in his apartment on August 20, Toma allows Index to keep the newfound cat she named Sphynx. He later meets Mikoto by the vending machine. Their meeting is interrupted by the arrival of Kuroko Shirai, Mikoto's kōhai and a teleporter, and a sudden appearance of a person that looks like Mikoto. As Toma heads home while carrying juice cans, another Mikoto clone appears and decides to help him carry them. Meanwhile, the most powerful Level 5 esper Accelerator battles a Mikoto's clone in an alleyway. The following day, Toma meets the same clone from yesterday trying to feed an abandoned cat. He stops by a bookstore, leaving behind the clone and the cat. Toma then finds the cat alone and stumbles upon a dead Mikoto clone in an alleyway. He reports it to Anti-Skill, but they find no trace of the dead body. Toma then encounters Mikoto's clones called "Sisters", including the clone he is with earlier named Misaka 10032. Toma decides to visit Mikoto in her dormitory for questioning but finds Kuroko instead. When their dorm supervisor is about to visit the room, Kuroko hides Toma under Mikoto's bed since her teleportation power does not work on him. He discovers a document about a project that will make Accelerator a Level 6 esper by killing 20,000 clones.
4	March 21, 2009	978-4-7575-2512-2	January 19, 2016	978-0-316-34597-2
16. "Report, Part 2" (報告書②, "Repōto 2"); 17. "Experiment No. 10032" (第10032次実験, "Dai Ichiman-san-ju-ni-ji Jikken"); 18. "Weakest VS Strongest, Part 1" (最弱VS最強①, "Saijaku Bāsasu Saikyō 1"); 19. "Weakest VS Strongest, Part 2" (最弱VS最強②, "Saijaku Bāsasu Saikyō 2"); 20. "Weakest VS Strongest, Part 3" (最弱VS最強③, "Saijaku Bāsasu Saikyō 3"); 21. "Epilogue" (エピローグ, "Epirōgu")
At a bridge, Mikoto recalls how she agreed in the past to provide her DNA map for treating patients with muscular dystrophy and the sudden spread of rumors about her clones being used for military purposes. Toma then arrives to confront her about his discovery of the project. Mikoto decides to let herself be killed by Accelerator's first attack, which will throw out the experiment's calculation. Toma prevents her departure, causing Mikoto to attack him. After their confrontation, Toma decides to fight Accelerator instead. He later arrives at the scene where the experiment is being conducted between Accelerator and Misaka 10032. As their fight continues, Toma manages to land a hit on Accelerator despite struggling from his vector attacks. Accelerator then finds his power can compress the air, thus creating plasma. Mikoto suddenly arrives and sees a beaten Misaka 10032. She urges her to help Toma by reversing the wind turbines that will interrupt the plasma's formation. Toma finally knocks Accelerator down. The following day, Misaka 10032 visits Toma in a hospital and informs him about the cancellation of the Level 6 Shift Project due to Accelerator's defeat. Mikoto arrives with purchased expensive cookies, but Toma prefers them to be handmade. A worried Index also visits him.
5	October 27, 2009	978-4-7575-2677-8	April 19, 2016	978-0-316-34598-9
22. "August 31" (8月31日, "Hachi-gatsu San-jū-ichi-nichi"); 23. "A Fake Date" (偽装デート, "Narikiri Dēto"); 24. "Imposter" (ニセモノ, "Nisemono"); 25. "Ouma Yamisaka (First Half)" (闇咲逢魔 (前編), "Yamisaka Ouma (Zenpen)"); 26. "Ouma Yamisaka (Second Half)" (闇咲逢魔 (後編), "Yamisaka Ouma (Kouhen)")
At the midnight on August 31, Toma struggles with Index's bites and stumbles upon his unfinished homework. Later that day, Mikoto is being stalked by the grandson of her school's chairman named Mitsuki Unabara. She later sees Toma with his friends Pierce Aogami and Motoharu Tsuchimikado passing by her dormitory. Mikoto then drags Toma and pretends as his girlfriend to get away from Mitsuki. In the end, Mikoto decides to stop their pretentious act when Toma gives her advice about Mitsuki's good intentions toward her. While waiting for Mikoto's return from a restaurant, Toma sees a person that looks like Mitsuki approaching the place. Mitsuki suddenly attacks him from behind and reveals him to be Etzali, an Aztec magician who uses Mitsuki's appearance by slicing his skin. He further tells his intention of killing Toma and his close friends, but he falls in love with Mikoto. Toma manages to defeat the magician and promises that he will protect her. Meanwhile, Mikoto overhears it from a distance and blushes. Later that night, Toma continues to finish his homework with Index in a restaurant when magician Ōma Yamisaka attacks them and takes her hostage. He plans to retrieve a book from Index's grimoires needed for curing his lover. Toma then saves Index and decides to help him remove the curse from the girl using his Imagine Breaker.
6	May 22, 2010	978-4-7575-2870-3	July 26, 2016	978-0-316-34599-6
27. "August 31, Part 2" (8月31日②, "Hachi-gatsu San-jū-ichi-nichi 2"); 28. "Communication" (会話, "Komyunikēshon"); 29. "Past of the Strongest" (『最強』の先, "Saikyō no Saki"); 30. "The Two Researchers, Part 1" (二人の研究者①, "Futari no Kenkyūsha 1"); 31. "The Two Researchers, Part 2" (二人の研究者②, "Futari no Kenkyūsha 2"); 32. "Virus Activation" (ウイルス発動, "Uirusu Hatsudō"); 33. "welcome To Tomorrow"
On the midnight of August 31, a group of delinquents attacks Accelerator after hearing his loss against a Level 0 but are defeated by his vector manipulation ability. As he passes by Toma's dormitory, Accelerator notices a little girl following him. She introduces herself as the 20001st clone of Mikoto named Last Order and wants his help in finding the researchers that will treat her incomplete body. Later afternoon, Accelerator and Last Order go to a restaurant for lunch when he sees a researcher of the Level 6 Shift Project named Ao Amai suspiciously leaving the place. Last Order suddenly faints, causing Accelerator to visit researcher Kikyō Yoshikawa for information about her treatment. He learns that Last Order is specially created as the administrator for the clones. Kikyō also informs him about the virus installed in her, which will cause them to go berserk upon activation by midnight. Accelerator returns to the restaurant and finds Last Order taken by Ao. Later night, he manages to find them in an abandoned research facility and subdues him. Accelerator discovers that the virus activation is already started. Without waiting for Kikyō to arrive at their location, he analyzes the pre-infection data and begins removing altered codes from Last Order using his powers. Meanwhile, Ao regains his consciousness and shoots him in the head. Kikyō arrives and manages to put Last Order in an incubator. Ao and Kikyō point their guns at each other then shots follow. In a hospital, Kikyō regains her consciousness and learns from frog-faced doctor Heaven Canceller that she and Accelerator are being treated by him.
7	November 12, 2010	978-4-7575-3053-9	October 25, 2016	978-0-316-34601-6
34. "Hyōka Kazakiri" (風斬氷華, "Kazakiri Hyōka"); 35. "Transfer Student" (転入生, "Ten'nyūsei"); 36. "Golem" (石像, "Gōremu"); 37. "Fun School Life" (楽しいガッコー生活, "Tanoshī Gakkō Seikatsu"); 38. "War in the Underground Mall" (地下街の戦争, "Chikagai no Sensō")
The following morning, Toma returns to his apartment after saving Ōma's lover from a curse. He then prepares to attend school for the first time since his memory loss. Komoe is about to introduce a transfer student to the class when Index shows up looking for Toma about her lunch. After the debacle, Aisa Himegami finally introduces herself as the transferee. Index is having trouble using the school's food vending machine when another transferee student Hyōka Kazakiri helps her operate it. After the opening ceremony, Toma invites Hyōka for lunch with him and Index. Aisa informs Toma about Hyōka's nature and her involvement with the Imaginary Number District. Meanwhile, a magician from the Church of England's Necessarius named Sherry Cromwell infiltrates Academy City and attacks Kuroko, who tries to apprehend her. Mikoto arrives and saves her from the golem's attack, but the magician manages to escape from them. After enjoying their lunch and playing at an arcade in the underground mall, Toma, Index, and Hyōka are found by the golem which begins to attack the place. Mikoto and Kuroko arrive at their location where the former meets Index for the first time. Kuroko teleports both Mikoto and Index to safety, leaving Toma and Hyōka behind. Hyōka shows up during the fight between Toma and Sherry and gets hit on his head, revealing a prism-like object inside her skull.
8	June 22, 2011	978-4-7575-3223-6	January 24, 2017	978-0-316-34602-3
39. "Hyōka Kazakiri" (カザキリ ヒョウカ, "Kazakiri Hyōka"); 40. "The Illusion That Musn't Be Broken" (幻想は壊されない, "Gensō wa Kowasarenai"); 41. "New Target" (新たな標的, "Arata na Hyōteki"); 42. "City of Shimmers" (陽炎の街, "Kagerō no Machi"); 43. "Ellis" (エリス, "Erisu"); 44. "Tomorrow, Again" (明日, また, "Ashita, Mata")
Hyōka shocks to see her true form and runs away, resulting in Sherry chasing her. Toma then calls Komoe for information about Hyōka and learns that she is an artificial human created by esper's AIM diffusion fields. Toma still decides to save her as a friend and seeks assistance from nearby Anti-Skills led by Aiho Yomikawa. As Sherry attacks and scolds Hyōka for being a monster, Toma arrives with Anti-Skills to save her. He manages to knock Sherry down but she escapes from him. Toma deduces that she plans on targeting Index next but is unable to leave the underground mall due to the lowered security shutter doors. Hyōka then decides to pursue Sherry instead through the hole the latter created earlier during the escape. Index arrives at a construction site while pursuing Sphynx and suddenly gets attacked by Sherry's golem. Index manages to evade its attacks using Spell Intercept but struggles to defeat it. Meanwhile, Toma descends the hole and encounters Sherry. She then reveals that the golem named Ellis is based on her friend of the same name from Academy City, who died after using magic despite being an esper because of the experiment conducted by the Church of England and Academy City. This event pushes Sherry to start a war between the magic and science sides. Their fight ensues until Toma finally subdues her. Back on the ground, Hyōka saves Index in time from the golem. Toma later arrives and destroys it with his Imagine Breaker. Inside the Windowless Building, Motoharu discusses the recent incident with Academy City's Board Chairman Aleister Crowley. While Toma is in the hospital, Hyōka bids farewell to Index and returns to the Imaginary Number District.
9	January 21, 2012	978-4-7575-3473-5	April 18, 2017	978-0-316-34605-4
45. "Reunion" (再会, "Saikai"); 46. "Orsola's Whereabouts" (オルソラ その行方, "Orusora Sono Yukue"); 47. "Robbery" (強奪, "Gōdatsu"); 48. "Miniaturized Pilgrimage" (縮図巡礼, "Shukuzu Junrei"); 49. "Incursion" (侵入, "Shin'nyū"); 50. "Amakusa-Style Tactics" (天草式戦術, "Amakusa-shiki Senjutsu")
In London, Stiyl learns from the Church of England's Archbishop Laura Stuart about the stolen grimoire called the "Book of Law" and a missing sister who can decipher it. Back in Academy City, he abducts Index and leaves a message for Toma to Motoharu's stepsister Maika Tsuchimikado. As he reaches the rendezvous per the message's instruction, Toma runs into a nun looking for direction toward Academy City. Meanwhile, Stiyl and Index are approached by Roman Catholic nun Agnese Sanctis. Toma then arrives with the nun who happens to be the missing sister named Orsola Aquinas. Suddenly, Orsola is taken by the Amakusa Catholics from them. Agnese and her fellow Roman Catholic battle nuns make preparations for the rescue of Orsola. A few hours later, the assault begins in a park where they locate the Amakusa Catholics. During the mayhem, Toma bumps into a runaway Orsola. He then gives her the cross necklace given to him by Stiyl earlier. Afterward, he meets the leader of Amakusa Church named Saiji Tatemiya. Toma and Stiyl manage to knock him down. The assault concludes following the defeat of the remaining Amakusa Catholics. Orsola is handed over to the Roman Catholics when a captured Saiji tells Toma and Index that she will be killed by them.
10	August 22, 2012	978-4-7575-3689-0	July 18, 2017	978-0-316-34606-1
51. "Roman Orthodox Church" (ローマ正教, "Rōma Seikyō"); 52. "The Greatest Gift" (最高の贈り物, "Saikō no Okurimono"); 53. "The Cross of Archbishop" (最大主教の十字架, "Ākubishoppu no Jūjika"); 54. "Sheol Fear" (魔滅の声, "Sheōru Fia"); 55. "Lotus Wand" (蓮の杖, "Rōtasu Wando"); 56. "Multiple Magic Circle Configuration" (多重構成魔方陣, "Tajū Kōsei Mahōjin"); 57. "Follow-up Report" (事後報告, "Jigohōkoku")
Saiji further reveals that Orsola finds the Roman Catholic Church hard to live in since they see her as a threat for being the Book of Law's decoder. He explains that the Amakusa Church wants to follow their former priestess Kaori's good examples by helping Orsola. Toma hears Orsola's scream but is prevented by Sisters Lucia and Angelene from seeing her. A fight between them ensues until the two sisters retreat upon orders. Saiji plans on rescuing both Orsola and his captured comrades. After entrusting him with Orsola's safety, Toma, Index, and Stiyl head back to Academy City, but Toma still decides to charge in a church where the Roman Catholic nuns torture Orsola. As Toma is surrounded by the nuns, Index, Stiyl, Saiji, and his Amakusa Catholics arrive. A battle follows while Toma carries Orsola to safety. Meanwhile, Index uses her ability called "Sheol Fear" against the nuns, which can break down their minds upon hearing it, but they counter-attack the power by jabbing their ears. Toma, Index, Stiyl, Saiji, and Orsola temporarily barricade themselves to plan their next move. They propose using Orsola's decrypting skill for negotiation, but Index finds her decryption methods incorrect. They continue fighting the Roman Catholic nuns, while Kaori and Motoharu watch from a distance. Toma then confronts Agnese, who uses her Lotus Wand against him. Despite struggling with the weapon's invisible attacks, Toma manages to land a hit on Agnese. Index, Stiyl, and Saiji arrive and reveal that they set up Stiyl's runes around the place to summon a gigantic Innocentius. Toma then delivers the finishing blow to Agnese. The following day, Kaori visits Toma in a hospital and informs him that Orsola and the Amakusa Catholics are placed under the protection of the Church of England. Back in London, Laura reveals to Stiyl that placing the Amakusa Catholics under her can keep Kaori in check since she is one of the 20 powerful Saints in the world.
11	February 22, 2013	978-4-7575-3875-7	October 31, 2017	978-0-316-34607-8
58. "Remnant of the Nightmare" (悪夢の残骸, "Akumu no Zangai"); 59. "Move Point" (座標移動, "Mūbu Pointo"); 60. "Move Point, Part 2" (座標移動②, "Mūbu Pointo ②"); 61. "August 21st" (八月二十一日, "Hachigatsu Ni-Jū-Ichi Nichi"); 62. "Teleport VS Move Point" (空間移動VS座標移動, "Terepōto Bāsasu Mūbu Pointo"); 63. "Personal Reality" (自分だけの現実, "Jibun dake no Genjitsu"); 64. "Promise" (約束, "Yakusoku"); 65. "Promise (Other Half)" (約束（のこり半分）, "Yakusoku (Nokori Hanbun)")
Toma and Index comment about the inconsistency of the weather forecasting recently. Back in the Tokiwadai Middle School, transferee student Mitsuko Kongō informs Kuroko about her plan to form a clique. Afterward, Mikoto and Kuroko go shopping when the latter receives a phone call from her fellow Judgment colleague Kazari Uiharu about a recent robbery in District 23. Kuroko then intercepts the robbers and retrieves the stolen suitcase from them. Suddenly, another teleporter named Awaki Musujime attacks Kuroko and steals the suitcase. She informs her about the destruction of the Tree Diagram and how its retrieval will cause the resumption of a certain "experiment" that will make Mikoto worry. While treating her wounds in her dormitory, Kuroko receives further information from Kazari about Awaki's ability called "Move Point" and her position as a guide to the Windowless Building. She then decides to secretly track Mikoto and witnesses her confrontation with Awaki. After escaping from Mikoto, Awaki encounters Kuroko again in a restaurant. Meanwhile, Misaka 10032 visits Toma's apartment to ask for help. Back in the restaurant, Awaki subdues Kuroko and tells her that she plans on using the Tree Diagram's remnants for animals to inherit esper powers. Kuroko rebukes Awaki's actions, causing her to break down as she recalls her past trauma from using her ability. Toma and Mikoto arrive to save Kuroko from heavy objects teleported by Awaki. Accelerator confronts Awaki after learning the ongoing events from Last Order and knocks her down following his destruction of the suitcase. The following day, Toma and Index visit Kuroko and Misaka 10032 in a hospital.
12	August 27, 2013	978-4-7575-4034-7	January 30, 2018	978-0-316-34608-5
66. "Daihaseisai Opening" (大覇星祭 開幕, "Daihaseisai Kaimaku"); 67. "First Event" (第一種目, "Dai Ichi Shumoku"); 68. "Second Event" (第ニ種目, "Dai Ni Shumoku"); 69. "Silent Coin" (表裏の騒静, "Sairento Koin"); 70. "Shorthand" (速記原典, "Shōtohando")
During the opening of Academy City's sports festival called "Daihaseisai", Toma's parents and Mikoto's mother Misuzu Misaka overhears their children agreeing on a penalty game. In London meanwhile, Laura informs Aleister about a trade that will take place in Academy City by magicians Oriana Thomson and Lidvia Lorenzetti. Toma later returns to his class and gets scolded by his classmate Seiri Fukiyose for being late. He overhears Komoe being belittled by an opposing teacher about her class. This pushes Toma and his classmates to become motivated in winning the Pole Toppling match. Motoharu simultaneously rendezvous with Stiyl who arrives in the city under the pretext of being Toma's relative. Following the event, Toma is dragged by Mikoto to win the Borrowed Item race. He later runs into Stiyl and Motoharu, who reveals his identity as a magician and spy for both Academy City and the Church of England. Toma also learns about the magicians who will trade an item called "Stab Sword" that can kill a Saint. After accidentally peeking on Index while changing to a cheerleading uniform and getting dragged by Seiri, Toma bumps into Oriana, whose Silent Coin ability is destroyed by his Imagine Breaker upon shaking their hands. Toma, Stiyl, and Motoharu pursue Oriana, leading them to a maintenance facility, but she manages to escape from them. They use a tracking spell to locate her, but she counterspells it. They discover that a Shorthand spell prevents Stiyl from using further magic. Toma and Motoharu find it on a middle school campus.
13	February 22, 2014	978-4-7575-4219-8	April 24, 2018	978-0-316-34609-2
71. "Shorthand, Part 2" (速記原典②, "Shōtohando ②"); 72. "Shorthand, Part 3" (速記原典③, "Shōtohando ③"); 73. "Shorthand, Part 4" (速記原典④, "Shōtohando ④"); 74. "Transaction" (取り引き, "Torihiki"); 75. "Noon Recess" (昼休み, "Hiruyasumi"); 76. "Back to Tracking" (追跡 再び, "Tsuiseki Futatabi"); 77. "Tsukebumi Tamazusa" (付文玉章, "Tsukebumi Tamazusa")
Toma and Motoharu sneak into the school campus, where they will compete in the Ball Tossing game against Tokiwadai Middle School. Toma then encounters Mikoto during the match and warns her not to touch the basket pole that might contain the Shorthand spell. Seiri drags Toma away but accidentally touches the real pole with the spell and falls unconscious. She is taken to the hospital under Heaven Canceller's care. With the destruction of the Shorthand spell, Stiyl finds Oriana's location using the tracking spell. An agitated Toma and Motoharu confront her, but the latter succumbs to her spell. Toma manages to hit Oriana despite struggling with her multiple spell attacks. Oriana decides to retreat, leaving an item she carried the whole time behind. It turns out to be a billboard sign instead of the Stab Sword. Back in London, Laura learns that the Stab Sword does not exist but rather a cross called "Croce di Pietro". The magicians then explain to Toma that the cross can put Academy City under the Roman Catholic Church's control. They temporarily postpone their pursuit of Oriana for them to acquire more information about the artifact. Toma and Index later join his parents, Mikoto, and her mother for lunch. Toma later meets Stiyl and both continue their hunt when Motoharu suddenly gets attacked by Oriana in his location. Motoharu bluffs that Kaori will arrive as a reinforcement from the Church of England, causing her to withdraw. A fleeing Oriana bumps into Aisa, who recently picks up Stiyl's rune cards. Believing that Aisa is part of the reinforcement, Oriana attacks her.
14	October 22, 2014	978-4-7575-4440-6	July 24, 2018	978-1-9753-5334-6
78. "Until the Night Parade" (ナイトパレードまでに, "Naito Parēdo Made Ni"); 79. "Triggering Condition" (発動条件, "Hatsudō Jōken"); 80. "Astronomical Observatory" (天文台, "Tenmondai"); 81. "Astronomical Observatory, Part 2" (天文台②, "Tenmondai ②"); 82. "Astronomical Observatory, Part 3" (天文台③, "Tenmondai ③"); 83. "Astronomical Observatory, Part 4" (天文台④, "Tenmondai ④"); 84. "Astronomical Observatory, Part 5" (天文台⑤, "Tenmondai ⑤"); 85. "Restart" (リスタート, "Risutāto")
Toma and Stiyl find a bloodied Aisa with Komoe. Komoe attempts to recreate the healing magic she did with Index before. Stiyl stays behind to assist Komoe as Toma continues pursuing Oriana. Meanwhile, Oriana regrets hurting Aisa after learning from Lidvia about her innocence. During their phone call, Toma and Motoharu deduce that Oriana walks around Academy City to find the right place to activate Croce di Pietro using constellations. Toma then receives an update from Stiyl about Aisa's recovering condition. He and Motoharu meet up in a mall when they receive a call from Orsola about the artifact's activation details. They discover that the best location for the cross to work is District 23. They later arrive at the district's airport when they are attacked by Oriana. Despite struggling from Oriana's attacks, Toma and Stiyl manage to knock her down. She then recalls in her past how helping others with good intentions leads to misfortune. This causes her to trust in the cross' power for everyone's happiness. Oriana wounds Stiyl but is finally defeated by Toma after being rebuked for her actions. He suddenly learns from Lidvia over Oriana's communication spell about the cross being outside of Academy City all this time and Oriana's role as a decoy to lure enemies toward her. Toma learns that the night parade's schedule will cause its fireworks to cover the night sky, rendering the artifact useless. In a hospital, Toma is visited by his parents, Index, Kuroko, and Mikoto, who informed him about their current lead in their penalty game. Meanwhile, a fleeing Lidvia is forcefully ejected from her plane along with Croce di Pietro as Laura mocks her through a communication spell. Lidvia chooses to save the artifact and plunges toward her apparent death. The following day, Toma and Seiri visit Aisa in her hospital room.
15	April 22, 2015	978-4-7575-4606-6	October 30, 2018	978-1-9753-5444-2
86. "Let's Take a Trip to Italy!" (イタリア旅行へ行こう！, "Itaria Ryokō e Ikou!"); 87. "Orsola of Chioggia" (キオッジアのオルソラ, "Kiojjia no Orusora"); 88. "Queen's Fleet, Part 1" (女王艦隊①, "Joō Kantai ①"); 89. "Queen's Fleet, Part 2" (女王艦隊②, "Joō Kantai ②"); 90. "Queen's Fleet, Part 3" (女王艦隊③, "Joō Kantai ③"); 91. "Queen's Fleet, Part 4" (女王艦隊④, "Joō Kantai ④")
Toma and Index arrive in Chioggia after winning a vacation trip to Italy. Index suddenly disappears while strolling with Toma, but Orsola shows up and brings him to her house where Index is found eating gelato. While dining with Index and Orsola, Toma meets a member of the Amakusa Church named Itsuwa. After helping pack up Orsola's belongings for her move to London, Toma and Index part ways with Orsola when they are suddenly attacked by the Roman Catholics. They manage to defeat the attackers, but Toma and Orsola accidentally board an ice-made ship that suddenly emerges from the canals. The ship then joins the others in the Adriatic Sea, forming a fleet called the "Queen's Fleet". Toma and Orsola hide in a room when Agnese suddenly finds them. She decides not to hand them over to the pursuers in exchange for saving Sister Lucia and Angelene. Toma and Orsola manage to free the two sisters, who both reveal a plan about using Agnese for the Rosary of the Appointed Time spell that will activate the large-scale magic of the fleet under their flagship called "Queen of the Adriatic Sea". Their ship is suddenly destroyed upon orders of Bishop Biagio Busoni to rid the intruders, sending Toma and the others under the sea. They are saved by Index, Saiji, and other Amakusa Catholics aboard a wooden submarine. Back on the shore, they discuss the purpose behind the fleet's sudden appearance and their plan in saving Agnese. Afterward, their rescue operation begins by sending decoy wooden ships to the Queen's Fleet.
16	November 21, 2015	978-4-7575-4792-6	January 22, 2019	978-1-9753-5445-9
92. "Queen's Fleet, Part 5" (女王艦隊⑤, "Joō Kantai ⑤"); 93. "Rosary of the Appointed Time" (刻限のロザリオ, "Kokugen no Rozario"); 94. "Rosary of the Appointed Time, Part 2" (刻限のロザリオ②, "Kokugen no Rozario ②"); 95. "Rosary of the Appointed Time, Part 3" (刻限のロザリオ③, "Kokugen no Rozario ③"); 96. "Every Road Home" (それぞれの家路, "Sorezore no Ieji"); 97. "Mikoto's Penalty Game" (美琴の罰ゲーム, "Mikoto no Batsu Gēmu")
Toma and the others manage to board a ship of the Queen's Fleet. During the fight with Agnese's battle nuns, Sister Angelene gets injured. Saiji and the Amakusa Catholics join the battle, allowing Toma, Index, and Orsola to reach the flagship. He splits up with Index and Orsola to get the attention of the ice golems. Toma later encounters Biagio, who decides to personally confront him. Biagio defeats him using his cross-related magic attacks. Index and Orsola arrive at Agnese's location, but Index draws the attention of incoming ice golems so Orsola enters the room alone. She finds Agnese inside an ice sphere when Biagio returns. He then reveals that the true purpose of activating the Queen of the Adriatic Sea is to destroy Academy City. A fight ensues between Orsola and Biagio until Agnese joins the former's side after learning the true reason behind the latter's actions. Toma joins them and prevents the self-destruction of the flagship, saving the Amakusa Catholics and Agnese's battle nuns. Following the incident, Orsola returns to London with Agnese, while Vento of the Front, a member of the God's Right Seat, forces Pope Matthai Reese of the Roman Catholic Church to sign an order investigating Toma as a threat. In Academy City, Toma encounters Mikoto demanding he takes the punishment for their penalty game after his loss at Daihaseisai.
17	May 21, 2016	978-4-7575-5002-5	April 30, 2019	978-1-9753-5446-6
98. "New Home and Sisters" (新居と妹達と, "Shinkyo to Shisutāzu to"); 99. "Misaka and Misaka's Revolution" (ミサカとミサカの革命と, "Misaka to Misaka no Kakumei to"); 100. "People That Meet in the Underground Shopping Center, Part 1" (地下街で出会う人々①, "Chikagai de Deau Hitobito ①"); 101. "People That Meet in the Underground Shopping Center, Part 2" (地下街で出会う人々②, "Chikagai de Deau Hitobito ②"); 102. "Amata Kihara, Part 1" (木原数多①, "Kihara Amata ①"); 103. "Amata Kihara, Part 2" (木原数多②, "Kihara Amata ②")
Aiho takes in Accelerator and Last Order as their guardian. Afterward, Last Order encounters Misaka 10032 who recently finished her check-up along with Misaka 10039, Misaka 13577, and Misaka 19090 to Heaven Canceller. She steals Misaka 10032's NV goggles, leading in a chase until the underground mall. Misaka 10032 encounters Toma who recently finished signing up a phone contract with Mikoto as part of his punishment. Toma buys a necklace for Misaka 10032 to distinguish her from other clones. He later encounters Last Order and learns about her role in the Misaka Network. Meanwhile, Accelerator and Aiho discuss repaying debts with kindness as they look for Last Order. He suddenly encounters a hungry Index who is looking for Toma and treated her with food. Index finds Toma as she accompanies Accelerator in the underground mall, while Last Order says goodbye to Toma to go home for Accelerator, crossing each other's paths as they return to their respective companions. Afterward, Accelerator returns with a purchased plaster for Last Order's wound when he is attacked by Hound Dogs led by Amata Kihara. Amata easily defeats Accelerator due to his knowledge of the latter's esper ability and presents him with the captured Last Order, causing Accelerator to become enraged and send her upward away from them. As Amata is about to kill Accelerator, Index shows up to return his pocket tissue.
18	November 22, 2016	978-4-7575-5150-3	July 23, 2019	978-1-9753-5447-3
104. "Intruder" (侵入者, "Shin'nyū-sha"); 105. "Intruder, Part 2" (侵入者②, "Shin'nyū-sha ②"); 106. "Intruder, Part 3" (侵入者③, "Shin'nyū-sha ③"); 107. "Intruder, Part 4" (侵入者④, "Shin'nyū-sha ④"); 108. "Intruder, Part 5" (侵入者⑤, "Shin'nyū-sha ⑤"); 109. "Testament" (学習装置(テスタメント), "Tesutamento"); 110. "Manifestation" (顕現, "Kengen")
While looking for Index, Toma finds unconscious Anti-Skills and encounters Last Order asking for help. Meanwhile, Vento, who is responsible for the sudden unconsciousness of civilians, infiltrates Academy City to kill Toma. She later encounters Amata who is attempting to destroy the van that contains Accelerator and Index fleeing from the scene. Accelerator drops off Index near Heaven Canceller's hospital and proceeds to a resource recycling facility in District 5 to obtain a "detergent" that can remove Last Order's "scent" from being tracked by Hound Dogs. He later engages in a fight with them until a lone member escapes and rendezvous with patrolling Anti-Skills, framing him as a murderer. Meanwhile, Toma and Last Order return to the scene, where the latter was kidnapped earlier, but are suddenly attacked by Hound Dogs. Vento neutralizes the Hound Dogs and proceeds on attacking Toma, but she suddenly retreats after feeling the side effects of using her magic. Toma uses the phone of Last Order, whom he told to flee the battle for safety, and gets in touch with Accelerator, who recently kills the Hound Dogs attacking Heaven Canceller's hospital for Index. Outside Academy City, Motoharu neutralizes a spell by the Roman Catholic Church intending to use it to skew unconscious civilians. Meanwhile, the Hound Dogs capture Last Order and installs her a virus that will bring forth Hyōka in her Fuse Kazakiri mode as a countermeasure against Vento.
19	September 22, 2017	978-4-7575-5404-7	November 5, 2019	978-1-9753-3196-2
111. "Divine Punishment" (天罰術式, "Tenkatsu Jutsushiki"); 112. "Fallen Angel: Fuse=KAZAKIRI" (堕天使 ヒューズ＝カザキリ, "Datenshi Hyuzu Kazakiri"); 113. "Limit Over" (リミット・オーバー, "Rimitto Ōbā"); 114. "Science and Refutation" (科学と反論, "Kagaku to Hanson"); 115. "Darkness to Darkness" (闇から闇へ, "Yami kara Yami e"); 116. "Before the Outbreak of War" (開戦前, "Kaisenmae")
Leaving the hospital, Index detects the presence of an "angel" in Hyōka's presence. She later encounters Mikoto and then Toma, who all agree to work together in saving Hyōka. Index explains the trigger for Vento's magic "Divine Punishment" and is instructed by Toma to work with Mikoto, who currently fights several Hound Dogs, to determine the nature behind the angel and the core that controls it. Toma reaches the area where Hyōka is and prevents Vento from attacking her since she sees her as a threat to the Roman Catholic Church. Vento reveals her hatred of science due to the death of her young brother, resulting in her joining God's Right Seat. Toma manages to defeat Vento when Acqua of the Back, another member of God's Right Seat, appears to retrieve her. Meanwhile, Accelerator attacks Amata's hideout after learning it from Academy City Board Director Thomas Platinaburg. Accelerator's choker later runs out of battery but still gathers strength to give Index, who arrives at the scene, time and stop Amata. With Mikoto's knowledge of the AIM diffusion fields, Index uses the power of singing to cut off Last Order from Hyōka's artificial angel form, saving the latter in the process. Following the death of Amata with his newfound power that produces pitch-black wings and Index's rescue of Last Order, Accelerator is approached by an unknown figure to have him join his side as a reparation for the recent events he is involved in. Three days after the incident, which is now known as the "09/30 incident", news about an impending war between Academy City and a religious group has stirred up tensions among Toma's class. They then decide to eat out in a sukiyaki restaurant.
20	January 22, 2018	978-4-7575-5583-9	January 21, 2020	978-1-9753-3197-9
117. "GROUP, Part 1" (グループ①, Gurūpu ①); 118. "GROUP, Part 2" (グループ②, Gurūpu ②); 119. "Anglican Church Women's Dormitory" (イギリス清教の女子寮, Igirisu Seikyō no Joshiryō); 120. "Misuzu Misaka, Part 1" (御坂美鈴①, Misaka Misuzu ①); 121. "Misuzu Misaka, Part 2" (御坂美鈴②, Misaka Misuzu ②); 122. "Misuzu Misaka, Part 3" (御坂美鈴③, Misaka Misuzu ③)
Accelerator, now part of the dark side organization GROUP consisting of Etzali, Motoharu, and Awaki, is informed of a mission to stop the armed Level 0 espers called Skill-Out from launching an attack with their bo-hiya-type weapons in the middle of the crisis between Academy City and the Roman Catholic Church. GROUP heads out to eliminate the leader, Ritoku Komaba, but Awaki and Accelerator struggle to defeat him due to his military-grade ultrasonic elastic taping that enhances his body. Before he kills Ritoku, Accelerator learns that he has a young girl he needs to protect, which is similar to his situation. Meanwhile in London, the women of Necessarius' dormitory are visited by Sasha Kreutzev, a member of the Russian Orthodox Church's Annihilatus, who wants to inquire about whose side the Anglican Church will take on between Academy City and the Roman Catholic Church. Back in Academy City, Accelerator and Toma on separate occasions encounter a drunk Misuzu who is looking for the database center of Dangai University for her university report. Toma later receives a call from her informing him of armed men infiltrating the university, while Accelerator receives a call from GROUP's liaison informing him of an order tasking Skill-Out in attacking the university to kill Misuzu since she is helping parents retrieve their children in the city amidst the impending war. With Accelerator's help in the shadows, Toma manages to get Misuzu out of the university until they encounter Shiage Hamazura, the new leader of Skill-Out, but Toma is able to defeat him. After the incident, Misuzu is relieved that there are people like Toma who can make Mikoto safe in the city. Seeing that Misuzu doesn't need to retrieve her daughter out of the city anymore, GROUP is informed that her assassination has been called off.
21	September 21, 2018	978-4-7575-5780-2	April 21, 2020	978-1-9753-3198-6
123. "Lambs Heading for a Hill" (子羊達は丘を目指す, Kohitsuji-tachi wa Oka wo Mezasu); 124. "Academy City Board of Directors" (学園都市統括理事会, Gakuen Toshi Tōkatsu Rijikai); 125. "Avignon, Part 1" (アビニョン①, Abinyon ①); 126. "Avignon, Part 2" (アビニョン②, Abinyon ②); 127. "Avignon, Part 3" (アビニョン③, Abinyon ③); 128. "Avignon, Part 4" (アビニョン④, Abinyon ④)
In Vatican City, the Pope, Acqua, and Terra of the Left, another member of God's Right Seat, meet up to discuss their plan against Academy City. After having bad luck at school and meeting Mikoto, Toma is held at gunpoint by an old lady. She introduces herself as Monaka Oyafune, a member of Academy City's Board of Directors and the mother of his teacher Suama, and wants his help in ending the ongoing anti-Academy City riots around the world using his right hand's power. Motoharu then arrives and shoots Monaka, revealing that it is a necessary cover-up for possible retribution since her action is against the will of the pro-war Board of Directors. Toma and Motoharu board a plane heading to France, with the latter revealing the Document of Constantine artifact as the cause of worldwide riots. They parachute above Avignon, but Toma gets separated from Motoharu and drowns in a river when Itsuwa rescues him. She explains that her presence in France is to investigate its ley lines for the Document of Constantine's activation. They are suddenly attacked by the rioters while inside a coffee shop but manage to escape them. Toma and Itsuwa manage to cut through the rioters and arrive at a museum where a portion of the ley lines can be accessible. As Itsuwa prepares to damage it, Terra arrives and attacks them. In the Tower of London, Stiyl and Agnese interrogate prisoners Lidvia and Biagio for information about God's Right Seat. Lidvia explains that their goal is to erase the original sin. Back in Avignon, Toma and Itsuwa struggle against Terra's Execution of Light spell attacks when Motoharu shows up to join their battle. During their confrontation, powered suits from Academy City suddenly arrive.
22	March 22, 2019	978-4-7575-6048-2	August 25, 2020	978-1-9753-1375-3
129. "Avignon Cleanup Operation" (アビニョン掃討作戦, Abinyon Sōtō Sakusen); 130. "Avignon Cleanup Operation, Part 2" (アビニョン掃討作戦②, Abinyon Sōtō Sakusen ②); 131. "Avignon Cleanup Operation, Part 3" (アビニョン掃討作戦③, Abinyon Sōtō Sakusen ③); 132. "Avignon Cleanup Operation, Part 4" (アビニョン掃討作戦④, Abinyon Sōtō Sakusen ④); 133. "Management" (人材派遣(マネジメント), Manejimento); 134. "School District 7 Concert Hall Front Plaza" (第七学区コンサートホール前広場, Dai Nana Gakku Konsāto Hōru Mae Hiroba); 135. "School District 18 Elementary Particle Laboratory - ITEM" (第一八学区素粒子研究所 - アイテム, Dai Jūhachi Gakku Soryūshi Kenkyūjo - Aitemu)
Toma and Itsuwa head toward the Palais des Papes as Motoharu stays behind to deal with the powered suits. Terra suddenly arrives at the palace with the Document of Constantine. After dealing with the powered suits, Motoharu notices stealth bombers unleashing a weapon made up of 3 kg iron sands around the city. Meanwhile, Terra discovers that Toma is unable to fully use his Imagine Breaker due to memory loss. Toma manages to defeat Terra and destroys the Document of Constantine. Before Toma can learn the secrets of the Imagine Breaker from Terra, the palace is destroyed by the weapon of stealth bombers. Meanwhile, Mikoto learns about Toma's memory loss after hearing his conversation with Terra over the phone. Back in the Vatican City, Terra returns to inform Acqua about the Russian Orthodox Church joining forces with the Roman Catholic Church against the Church of England and Academy City. Acqua rebukes Terra's decision of using innocent people to adjust his spell and kills him. Back in Academy City, GROUP, consisting of Motoharu, Accelerator, Awaki, and Etzali, receive information about a person conspiring with a criminal organization. Motoharu subdues the person known as the "Management" and calls Etzali to infiltrate his apartment for information. SCHOOL operative Banka Yobō intercepts the transport vehicle that holds the Management and kills him. Etzali inspects the apartment when BLOCK operatives storm in but manages to blend in through disguise. With the information left behind by Etzali, Motoharu discovers that sniper Sunazara Chimitsu is hired to assassinate Monaka. He and Accelerator manage to save Monaka from an assassination attempt. Awaki informs her teammates about the involvement of SCHOOL in the assassination plot and the appearance of other dark side organizations, namely ITEM, MEMBER, and BLOCK. Meanwhile, ITEM, consisting of the fourth most powerful Level 5 esper Shizuri Mugino, Rikō Takitsubo, Saiai Kinuhata, and Frenda Seivelun, deduces that SCHOOL uses the assassination attempt as a diversion for their actual goal. GROUP receives information about the virus storage center sabotage and the satellite control center hacking. Meanwhile, ITEM arrives in a particle engineering laboratory.
23	November 12, 2019	978-4-7575-6337-7	May 18, 2021	978-1-9753-1698-3
136. "School District 18 Elementary Particle Laboratory - SCHOOL" (第18学区素粒子工学研究所 - スクール, Dai Jūhachi Gakku Soryūshi Kōgaku Kenkyūjo - Sukūru); 137. "School District 23 Terminal Station" (第二三学区ターミナル駅, Dai Nijūsan Gakku Tāminaru Eki); 138. "School District 4 Refrigerated Warehouse" (第四学区冷凍倉庫, Dai Yon Gakku Reitōsōko); 139. "School District 11 Warehouse Zone" (第一一学区倉庫街, Dai Jūichi Gakku Reitōsōkogai); 140. "School District 10 Reformatory" (第一〇学区 少年院, Dai Jū Gakku Shōnenin); 141. "School District 10 Reformatory, Part 2 (第一〇学区 少年院②, Dai Jū Gakku Shōnenin ②)
ITEM encounters the second most powerful Level 5 esper and SCHOOL leader Teitoku Kakine stealing the Tweezers in the laboratory. As they give chase to the fleeing Teitoku, ITEM's car is suddenly rammed by SCHOOL operative Kaibi Gokusai. Shizuri and Rikō split up with fellow member Shiage to continue the pursuit. Kaibi fails to capture Shiage but finds an injured Frenda instead. In Teitoku's hideout, MEMBER leader Professor arrives to suppress the rebellion against the Board Chairman but is killed by Teitoku. While at the satellite control center, Accelerator learns from Etzali about the BLOCK's goal to attack District 13 and subdues MEMBER operative Saraku. Meanwhile, Etzali learns that the team's actual objective is to shut down the city's outer wall security to aid in the entry of 5,000 mercenaries. He manages to bring down the mercenaries' numbers by getting the attention of six-winged helicopters. GROUP begins interrogating a captured mercenary. The captive reveals that they are hired to storm the juvenile hall where Awaki's former partners are imprisoned to use them as a bargaining chip for Awaki to guide them into the Windowless Building and destroy it. GROUP arrives at the juvenile hall in District 10 when MEMBER operative Xochitl shows up to confront Etzali for betraying their Aztec magic cabal. Accelerator stays behind to repel the remaining mercenaries as Motoharu and Awaki move forward. A defeated Xochitl reveals about reading an original grimoire that causes her body to unravel like bandages. Etzali manages to save her by borrowing a portion of the grimoire's power. Inside the juvenile hall, BLOCK operative Teshio Megumi disagrees with Saku's plan of using explosives to breach the prison rooms. She then subdues him and fights Motoharu and Awaki. Teshio knocks down Motoharu but is defeated by Awaki who overcomes her past trauma of using teleportation powers.
24	June 12, 2020	978-4-7575-6675-0	September 21, 2021	978-1-9753-2443-8
142. "School District 3 "Hideout", Part 1" (第三学区"隠れ家"①, Dai San Gakku Kakurega ①); 143. "School District 3 "Hideout", Part 2" (第三学区"隠れ家"②, Dai San Gakku Kakurega ②); 144. "School District 3 "Hideout", Part 3" (第三学区"隠れ家"③, Dai San Gakku Kakurega ③); 145. "School District 3 Automated Refinement Plant" (第三学区 自動精製工場, Dai San Gakku Jidō Seisei Kōjō); 146. "School District 3 Automated Refinement Plant, Part 2" (第三学区 自動精製工場②, Dai San Gakku Jidō Seisei Kōjō ②); 147. "School District 7 Outdoor Café" (第七学区オープンカフェ, Dai Nana Gakku Ōpun Kafe)
ITEM's hideout is suddenly attacked by Teitoku, who plans on taking out Rikō due to her AIM Stalker ability. Saiai helps Shiage and Rikō to escape. Rikō pushes Shiage inside an elevator for safety as they get cornered by Teitoku. Shiage later learns from Teitoku about the Body Crystal drugs that are being used to activate her powers. Teitoku retreats with Kaibi since they believe that Rikō's further use of her power will kill her, completing their plan in the process. Shiage brings her to Aiho for safety when Shizuri arrives with dead Frenda's half body. He then lures her away from the two by making her chase after him for the Body Crystal he possessed. Shiage hides in an automated plant refinement facility and avoids incoming attacks from Shizuri's Meltdowner power. She wounds his ear with a screwdriver, but he counter-attacks by stabbing her eye and takes her out with gunshots. Back in SCHOOL's hideout, Teitoku tells Kaibi about the scattered microscopic spy machines called "Underline" that are being used by Aleister to monitor Academy City and how the Tweezers can grab one Underline to contact the Board Chairman. Teitoku then reveals his desire to kill Accelerator so that he will become Aleister's main plan instead of him. Meanwhile, Kazari accompanies a lost Last Order who wants to find Accelerator. Teitoku arrives and interrogates Kazari for Last Order's location. Accelerator then arrives just as Teitoku is about to kill Kazari.
25	February 12, 2021	978-4-7575-7086-3	April 26, 2022	978-1-9753-3998-2
148. "School District 7 Pedestrian Scramble" (第七学区スクランブル交差点, Dai Nana Gakku Sukuranburu Kōsaten); 149. "Sometime, Somewhere" (いつか、どことも知れぬ場所で, Itsuka, Doko to mo Shirenu Basho de); 150. "Pronouncement" (宣告, Senkoku); 151. "The Amakusa Live-In Bodyguard" (天草式お泊まり護衛, Amakusa-shiki Otomari Goei); 152. "School District 22" (第二二学区, Dai Nijū'ni Gakku); 153. "Attack" (襲撃, Shūgeki); 154. "Aftermath of the Attack" (襲撃ーその後, Shūgeki - So no Ato)
Accelerator struggles from Teitoku's Dark Matter ability, which produces white wings from his back. He still defeats him while protecting civilians around them. Aiho arrives and stops Accelerator from shooting an injured Teitoku but is suddenly stabbed by the latter. Accelerator goes berserk and begins to hardly strike Teitoku until Last Order shows up and calms him down. A recovering Accelerator escapes from a hospital and reunites with GROUP, which then discusses an organization called "DRAGON" that is not present in recent events. A few days later, the Church of England receives Terra's remains and a letter from Acqua about his plan of crushing Toma. Back in Academy City, Toma's class struggles with getting lunch so they plan on going outside the school to buy one. As Toma, Motoharu, Pierce, and Seiri head out, their teacher, Saigo, finds them and chases Toma. Meanwhile, Itsuwa waits outside Toma's school when she sees him being pursued by a man she thought to be Acqua. After school, Itsuwa warns Toma about being targeted by Acqua but proclaims that she will protect him as his live-in bodyguard. Later night in Toma's apartment, Index accidentally destroys their bathtub from cleaning it. Itsuwa then suggests going to a bathhouse in District 22 instead. After they took bath, Toma and Itsuwa are suddenly attacked by Acqua. Their fight concludes with Acqua giving a one-day extension for handing over the right arm to a badly injured Toma. He is later admitted to a hospital as Itsuwa and the rest of the Amakusa Catholics, who also get defeated by Acqua while guarding him, watch over him. Saiji admonishes Itsuwa for blaming herself and begins to prepare their counter-attack.
26	October 12, 2021	978-4-7575-7522-6	November 22, 2022	978-1-9753-4745-1
155. "The Expected Time" (来るべき時, Kitarubekitoki); 156. "William Orwell" (Wiriamu Oruweru); 157. "Divine Mother Worship" (聖母崇拝, Seibo Sūhai); 158. "Saint Destroyer" (聖人崩し, Seijin Kuzushi); 159. "Saint Destroyer, Part 2" (聖人崩し②, Seijin Kuzushi ②); 160. "Saint Destroyer, Part 3" (聖人崩し③, Seijin Kuzushi ③); 161. "Saint Destroyer, Part 4" (聖人崩し④, Seijin Kuzushi ④)
While he is on a phone call with the Pope, Acqua is attacked by unmanned Academy City powered suits but destroys them easily. Meanwhile, the Amakusa Catholics prepare for their next move against Acqua when they receive a call from Orsola about his past and fighting styles. Orsola also reveals that Acqua is a former mercenary from England named William Orwell. Afterward, the Amakusa Catholics confront Acqua, with Itsuwa striking the first blow. Despite their group effort and with the Saint Destroyer as their powerful spell, the Amakusa Catholics are defeated by Acqua using his power from being both the Saint and a member of the God's Right Seat. Still, Acqua retreats after sensing the presence of Kaori, another Saint, and fights her. Kaori struggles with his immense power and asks the Amakusa Catholics to help her in the fight against him. Meanwhile, Toma slips out of the hospital after regaining consciousness to join the Amakusa Catholics and encounters Mikoto. Mikoto prevents him from going to the battle, revealing her knowledge of his memory loss, but decides to let him go while realizing her feelings for him.
27	May 12, 2022	978-4-7575-7920-0	August 22, 2023	978-1-9753-7149-4
162. "Saint Destroyer, Part 5" (聖人崩し⑤, Seijin Kuzushi ⑤); 163. "A Guide to Further Disturbance" (さらなる騒乱への案内人, Saranaru Sōran e no Annainin); 164. "Holy Right" (聖なる右, Seinaru Migi); 165. "Direct Flight to the Land of Magic" (魔術の国への直行便, Majutsu no Kuni e no Chokkō-bin); 166. "Sky Bus 365, Part 1" (スカイバス365①, Sukai Basu 365 ①); 167. "Sky Bus 365, Part 2" (スカイバス365②, Sukai Basu 365 ②)
The Amakusa Catholics prepare to attack Acqua after Kaori learned about his weakness. Toma arrives to counter Acqua's attack with his Imagine Breaker as the Amakusa Catholics defeat him with the Saint Destroyer spell. Following the battle, Itsuwa and Index are in Toma's hospital room when Kaori shows up wearing an erotic maid outfit that is suggested by Motoharu to show her gratitude. Sometime later in Vatican City, Fiamma of the Right proposes to the Pope to annihilate the United Kingdom to obtain something that they can use against Academy City. A fight ensues between them, with the Pope losing against Fiamma. The Pope orders Vento to capture him. In London, Kaori and the Knight Leader discuss the incident in the Eurotunnel and the hostility between France and the United Kingdom. After school, Toma encounters Mikoto and tells her to keep his memory loss a secret. Later in his apartment, Motoharu instructs Toma to go to London. Suddenly, a smoke bomb attacks him and Index and they lose consciousness, only for them to wake up later in an airport. Toma and Index take a regular flight to the United Kingdom via the Sky Bus airliner. While the plane temporarily lands in France, Toma sees blood in a room when a flight attendant restrains him. The flight crew reveals a terrorist who is hiding among the passengers. Meanwhile, the terrorist named Musset occupies Toma's seat to install an emergency landing jammer near its seat when Index discovers him. Toma saves Index as she is about to get killed by the terrorist in a room close to his. The plane suddenly detects a loss of fuel, which is revealed to be magic by Laura to force an emergency landing in the countryside. Her magic is later interfered with by an unknown organization from Scotland. Toma deduces that there is another terrorist in the plane and finds him in the cargo hold planning to bomb it. The terrorist is later subdued by him with Stiyl's help who arrives on another plane as per Laura's instruction.
28	December 12, 2022	978-4-7575-8304-7	June 18, 2024	978-1-9753-7693-2
168. "Council of War, Part 1" (作戦会議①, Sakusen Kaigi ①); 169. "Council of War, Part 2" (作戦会議②, Sakusen Kaigi ②); 170. "Council of War, Part 3" (作戦会議③, Sakusen Kaigi ③); 171. "New Light, Part 1" (新たなる光①, Arata naru Hikari ①); 172. "New Light, Part 2" (新たなる光②, Arata naru Hikari ②); 173. "New Light, Part 3" (新たなる光③, Arata naru Hikari ③); 174. "Three-sided War" (三つ巴の戦い, Mitsudomoe no Tatakai)
Arriving at an airport in Edinburgh, Toma and Index are picked up by Kaori and brought to Buckingham Palace, where they meet the Knight Leader and Queen Elizard. Elizard introduces Toma to the second replica of the Curtana sword she is wielding and explains how it is related to the three factions in the United Kingdom–Royal, Knights, and Church–that control the country. Toma then meets the Queen's daughters: Riméa, Carissa, and Villian. During the meeting, Elizard orders the Knight Leader and Index to investigate the Eurotunnel incident and Kaori to find the magic cabal that has interfered with Sky Bus 365 emergency landing. Kaori learns from Agnese the involvement of the New Light cabal in the interference and their recent excavation. Carissa orders Toma to join Oriana, who has made a deal with the Anglican Church, in capturing New Light. In London, New Light members Bayloupe, Lessar, and Floris have arrived with each holding a Skíðblaðnir suitcase. Lessar encounters Toma and Oriana, while Bayloupe and Floris are respectively captured by Itsuwa and Kaori. Meanwhile, Agnese deduces with Lucia and Angelene the suitcases' capability to teleport the hidden excavated item between them. She then contacts Toma, who is in the middle of pursuing Lessar, to inform him about the suitcases. Toma manages to capture Lessar, but the latter teleports the hidden item to Lancis, another member of New Light who is currently located outside the city, and also reveals the existence of the fifth suitcase. The Knight Leader, who owns the fifth suitcase, receives the item from Lancis, which turns out to be the original Curtana sword. Carissa wields it and with the backing of the Knights of England, declares a coup d'état against the British monarchy. The Knights of England and the police force in the country begin their operation toward other factions, facing off against the witches, Agnese Forces, and Laura and Elizard. At the Eurotunnel, Carissa mobilizes the country's military force toward France after confirming with Index about the French's involvement in the bombing.
29	July 12, 2023	978-4-7575-8656-7	October 15, 2024	978-1-9753-9040-2
175. "Mercenary and Princess, Part 1" (傭兵と姫君①, Yōhei to Himesama ①); 176. "Mercenary and Princess, Part 2" (傭兵と姫君②, Yōhei to Himesama ②); 177. "Mercenary and Princess, Part 3" (傭兵と姫君③, Yōhei to Himesama ③); 178. "Mercenary and Princess, Part 4" (傭兵と姫君④, Yōhei to Himesama ④); 179. "Knight and Mercenary, Part 1" (騎士と傭兵①, Kishi to Yōhei ①); 180. "Knight and Mercenary, Part 2" (騎士と傭兵②, Kishi to Yōhei ②); 181. "Knight and Mercenary, Part 3" (騎士と傭兵③, Kishi to Yōhei ③)
30	February 9, 2024	978-4-7575-9046-5	May 13, 2025	979-8-8554-0999-4
182. "Dimension Severing" (次元切断, Jigensetsudan); 183. "Under the Palace" (アンダー・ザ・パレス, Andā za Paresu); 184. "Under the Palace, Part 2" (アンダー・ザ・パレス②, Andā za Paresu ②); 185. "Convened Meeting" (召集会議, Shōshū Kaigi); 186. "Final Battle! Buckingham Palace, Part 1" (決戦！バッキンガム宮殿①, Kessen! Bakkingamu-kyūden ①); 187. "Final Battle! Buckingham Palace, Part 2" (決戦！バッキンガム宮殿②, Kessen! Bakkingamu-kyūden ②); 188. "Final Battle! Buckingham Palace, Part 3" (決戦！バッキンガム宮殿③, Kessen! Bakkingamu-kyūden ③)
31	November 12, 2024	978-4-7575-9509-5	November 25, 2025	979-8-8554-2045-6
189. "Final Battle! Buckingham Palace, Part 4" (決戦！バッキンガム宮殿④, Kessen! Bakkingamu-kyūden ④); 190. "Final Battle! Buckingham Palace, Part 5" (決戦！バッキンガム宮殿⑤, Kessen! Bakkingamu-kyūden ⑤); 191. "Final Battle! Buckingham Palace, Part 6" (決戦！バッキンガム宮殿⑥, Kessen! Bakkingamu-kyūden ⑥); 192. "Final Battle! Buckingham Palace, Part 7" (決戦！バッキンガム宮殿⑦, Kessen! Bakkingamu-kyūden ⑦); 193. "Final Battle! Buckingham Palace, Part 8" (決戦！バッキンガム宮殿⑧, Kessen! Bakkingamu-kyūden ⑧); 194. "Final Battle! Buckingham Palace, Part 9" (決戦！バッキンガム宮殿⑨, Kessen! Bakkingamu-kyūden ⑨); 195. "The Third Arm and the Right Hand" (第三の腕と右手と, Daisan no Ude to Migite to); 196. "Index's Remote Control" (禁書目録(インデックス)外部制御霊装, Indekkusu Gaibu Seigyo rei sō)
32	June 12, 2025	978-4-7575-9888-1	August 25, 2026	979-8-8554-3602-0
197. "Again, 'Group'" (再び、『グループ 』, Futatabi, "Gurūpu"); 198. "Newborn Item" (アイテム新生, Aitemu Shinsei); 199. "Spark Signal" (迎電部隊(スパークシグナル), Supāku Shigunaru); 200. "Remnant Hunt" (残党狩り, Zantōgari); 201. "Remnant Hunt, Part 2" (残党狩り②, Zantōgari ②); 202. "Remnant Hunt, Part 3" (残党狩り③, Zantōgari ③)
33	February 12, 2026	978-4-301-00319-9	—	—
203. "School District 22 Observatory" (第二二学区天文台, Dai Nijū'ni Gakku Tenmondai); 204. "School District 3 Underground Shopping Center" (第三学区地下街, Dai San Gakku Chikagai); 205. "School District 2 Shiokishi's Shelter" (第二学区 潮岸の隠れ家, Dai Ni Gakku Shiokishi no Kakurega); 206. "School District 2 Shiokishi's Shelter, Part 2" (第二学区 潮岸の隠れ家②, Dai Ni Gakku Shiokishi no Kakurega ②); 207. "School District 2 Shiokishi's Shelter, Part 3" (第二学区 潮岸の隠れ家③, Dai Ni Gakku Shiokishi no Kakurega ③); 208. "School District 23 Fighter Jet Hangar" (第二三学区 戦闘機格納庫, Dai Nijūsan Gakku Sentōki Kakunōko); 209. "School District 23 Fighter Jet Hangar, Part 2" (第二三学区 戦闘機格納庫②, Dai Nijūsan Gakku Sentōki Kakunōko ②)
34	September 11, 2026	978-4-301-00753-1	—	—
210. "Dragon" Appears" (『ドラゴン』現出(げんしゅつ), "Doragon" Genshutsu); 211. "Three Heroes" (三人のヒーロー, San-nin no Hīrō); 212. "Proclamation of War" (宣戦布告, Sensen Fukoku); 213. "Science, and The Other Principle" (科学と、もう一つの法則, Kagaku to, mō Hitotsu no Hōsoku); 214. "Infiltrating The Forward Operating Base" (前線基地侵入, Zensen Kichi Shinnyū); 215. "Infiltrating The Forward Operating Base 2" (前線基地侵入②, Zensen Kichi Shinnyū ②); 216. "Elizalina Alliance of Independent Nations" (エリザリーナ独立国同盟, Erizarīna Dokuritsugoku Dōmei)

=== Chapters not yet in tankōbon format ===
- 217. "Distortion of the World" (世界の歪み, Sekai no Yugami)
- 218. "Judgement Handed Down" (下される審判, Kudasareru Shinpan)
- 219. "Misaka Worst" (番外個体(ミサカワースト), Bangai Kotai (Misaka Wāsuto))
- 220. "Misaka Worst, Part 2" (番外個体(ミサカワースト)②, Bangai Kotai (Misaka Wāsuto) ②)
- 221. "Cleanup and Resistance" (掃討(そうとう)と抵抗(ていこう), Sōtō to Teikō)

== Side stories ==
=== A Certain Scientific Dark Matter ===
No.	Japanese release date	Japanese ISBN
1	March 26, 2020	978-4-04-913105-5
Chapters 1–4

=== A Certain Scientific Mental Out ===
==== Volume list ====
No.	Japanese release date	Japanese ISBN
1	February 25, 2022	978-4-04-112179-5; 978-4-04-112180-1 (SE)
1. "Queen of Tokiwadai" (常盤台の女王, Tokiwadai no Jo'ō); 2. "Student Council Election" (生徒会長選挙, Seito Kaichō Senkyo); 3. "Target M" (目標M, Mokuhyō M); 4. "Relic" (遺産(レリック), Rerikku; lit. 'Legacy'); 5. "Girlish Mind" (乙女心, Otomekokoro); 6. "Nice to Meet You" (はじめまして, Hajimemashite)
2	January 26, 2023	978-4-04-112842-8
7. "Natural Enemy" (天敵, Tenteki); 8. "Fighting Together" (共闘, Kyōtō); 9. "Even If We Die" (わたしたちが死んでも, Watashi-tachi ga Shinde mo); 10. "Irregular" (例外事象(イレギュラー), Reigaijishō (Iregyurā); lit. 'Exceptional Event'); 11. "That Can't Be True" (んなワケあるか, Nnawakearuka); 12. "Me Too" (私だって, Watashidatte); 13. "Mental Out" (心理掌握(メンタルアウト), Shinri Shōaku (Mentaru Auto); lit. 'Psychological Control')
3	January 10, 2024	978-4-04-114737-5; 978-4-04-114738-2 (SE)
14. Synthesize Grid (万能結晶(シンセサイズグリッド), Shinsesaizu Guriddo); 15. Railgun / Mental Out (超電磁砲(レールガン)/心理掌握(メンタルアウト), Rērugan/Mentaru Auto); 16. Quite an Actress, isn't She? (なかなかの女優でしょう？, Nakanaka no Joyūdeshō?); 16.5. Sinfully Yummy (つみぶかいアジ, Tsumibukai Aji); 17. Starting Crystal (始点の結晶, Shiten no Kesshō); 18. Strained Relationship (緊張力のある関係, Kinchōryoku no aru Kankai); 19. Us and Regeneration (『□□(わたしたち)』と『回生』, (Watashi-tachi) to Kaisei); 19.5. Summer of Eleven (サマー オブイレブン, Samā obu Irebun); 20. True Body (真体, Shintai); 21. Storm (嵐, Arashi)
4	February 26, 2025	978-4-04-115949-1
22. An Honest Soul (真っ直ぐな心, Massuguna Kokoro); 23. An Insolent Lady and a Scummy Teacher (小娘とクソ先公, Ko Musume to Kuso Senkō); 24. Ladylike Manners (淑女の嗜み(レディライクマナー), Rediraiku Manā); 25. Life Experiences (人生経験, Jinseikeiken); 26. Surprise (サプライズ, Sapuraizu); 27. Pride Left (名誉の手袋(プライドレフト), Puraido Refuto); 28. The Monster (バケモノ, Bakemono); 29. Resolve (覚悟, Kakugo)
5	February 25, 2026	978-4-04-117117-2; 978-4-04-117115-8 (SE)

==== Chapters not yet in tankōbon format ====
- Chapters 29.5-34

=== Ace Mikoto Misaka vs Queen Misaki Shokuhō!! ===
No.	Japanese release date	Japanese ISBN
1	June 7, 2024	978-4-04-915555-6

== Others ==
=== A Certain Magical Index Comic Guide ===
No.	Japanese release date	Japanese ISBN
5.5	October 27, 2009	978-4-7575-2675-4
1. "Character Profile: Toma Kamijo, Index, Stiyl Magnus, Kaori Kanzaki, & Komoe Tsukuyomi"; 2. "World Exploration - I - Side Science"; 3. "World Exploration - II - Side Magic"; 4. "Character Profile: Mikoto Misaka, Misaka's Little Sister, Accelerator, Kuroko Shirai, Pierce Aogami, Motoharu Tsuchimikado, Maika Tsuchimikado, Frog-faced Doctor, Laura Stuart, Aztec Wizard, & Ouma Yamisaka"; 5. "Authors Interview"; 6. "Glossary"
11.5	February 22, 2013	978-4-7575-3871-9

=== A Certain Everyday Index-san ===
No.	Japanese release date	Japanese ISBN
1	February 22, 2014	978-4-7575-4220-4
Chapters 1–11
2	October 22, 2014	978-4-7575-4441-3
Chapters 12–22
3	April 22, 2015	978-4-7575-4607-3
Chapter 23–33
4	November 21, 2015	978-4-7575-4793-3
Chapters 34–46
5	May 21, 2016	978-4-7575-5003-2
Chapters 47–57; Final Day

== Crossover ==
=== The Circumstance Leading to a Simple Killer Princess' Marriage Was a Certain Magical Heavy Zashiki Warashi ===
No.	Japanese release date	Japanese ISBN
1	November 21, 2015	978-4-7575-4794-0
1. "An Otherworldly Battle That Begins with Toma Kamijo's Usual Misfortune" (上条当麻のいつも不幸から始まる異世界バトル, Kamijō Tōma no Itsumo Fukō kara Hajimaru Isekai Batoru); 2. "Grainy Ground and the Search to Solve the Mystery of the Heavy Dungeon" (木目の大地の謎を解くへヴィーなダンジョン探索, Mokume no Daichi no Nazowotoku Hevī na Danjon Tansaku); 3. "When Men and Women from Different Worlds Travel Together, Tragedy and Comedy Intersect" (悲劇と喜劇が交差すろ男女一緒の異世界旅行, Higeki to Kigeki ga Kōsa Suru Danjo Issho no Isekai Ryokō); 4. "An Absurd Lost Item Under Attack from a 'Translucent Robot'" (「半透明のロボット」に襲われる不条理な落とし物拾い, "Hantōmei no Robotto" ni Osowareru Fujōrina Otoshimono Hiroi); 5. "The Deep Otherworldly Circumstances Produced by the Justice of God" (神の理が作り出すディープな異世界事情, Kami no Ri ga Tsukuridasu Dīpu na Isekai Jijō)
2	December 22, 2015	978-4-7575-4827-5
6. "The Gods' Gazes upon the Girl Who Wishes for Salvation and the Protagonists' Decision" (罪人を救おうとするヘルとヘルを救おうとする主役達の試練, Kyūsai o Negau Shōjo e no Kamigami no Manazashi to Shujinkō-tachi no Ketsudan); 7. "The Hel Trying to Save the Sinners and the Ordeal of the Protagonists Trying to Save Hel" (救済を願う少女への神々の眼差しと主人公達の決断, Tsumibito o Sukuō to Suru Heru to Heru o Sukuō to Suru Shayaku-tachi no Shiren); 8. "The Conflict in Which Gods, Archenemies, Heroes and an Unprecedented Monster Fight Each Other" (神と宿敵と英雄と前人未踏の怪物がせめぎ合う闘争, Kami to Shukuteki to Eiyū to Zenjinmitō no Kaibutsu ga Semegiau Tōsō); Last. "The Circumstances of the Closure Which Marks the End of the Battle to Bring About a Certain World's Destruction" (とある世界の破滅をもたらす戦いが終わりを告げる終幕事情, Toaru Sekai no Hametsu wo motarasu Tatakai ga Owari wo Tsugeru Shūmaku Jijō)

=== A Certain Magical Index × Cyber Troopers Virtual-On: A Certain Magical Virtual-On ===
No.	Japanese release date	Japanese ISBN
1	March 10, 2018	978-4-04-893774-0
Chapters 1–5
2	October 26, 2018	978-4-04-912130-8
Chapters 6–10
3	June 26, 2019	978-4-04-912603-7
Chapters 11–16
