= Tezutsu-hanabi =

Traditional Japanese pyrotechnic device

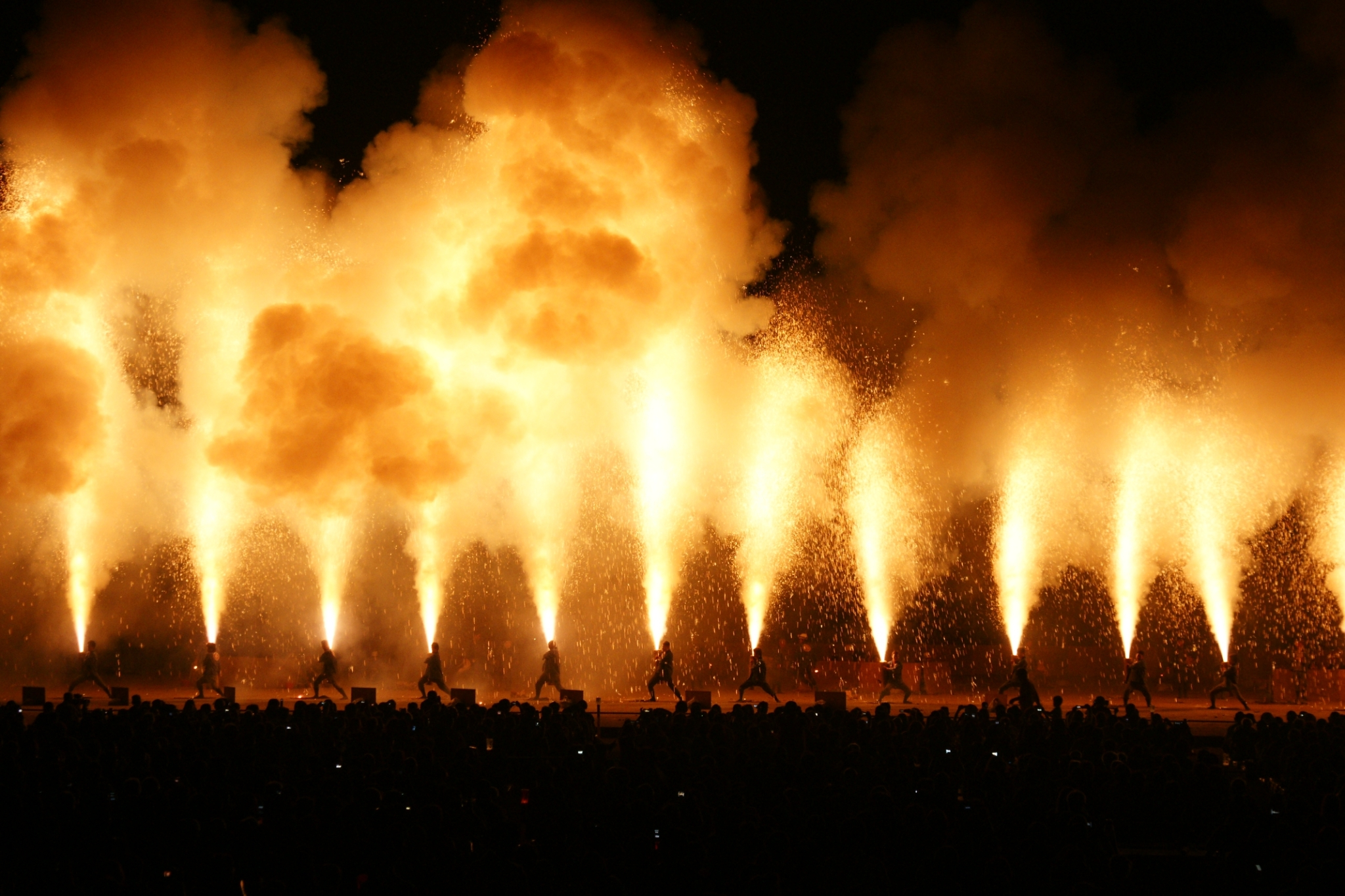
Tezutsu-hanabi demonstrated in Toyohashi

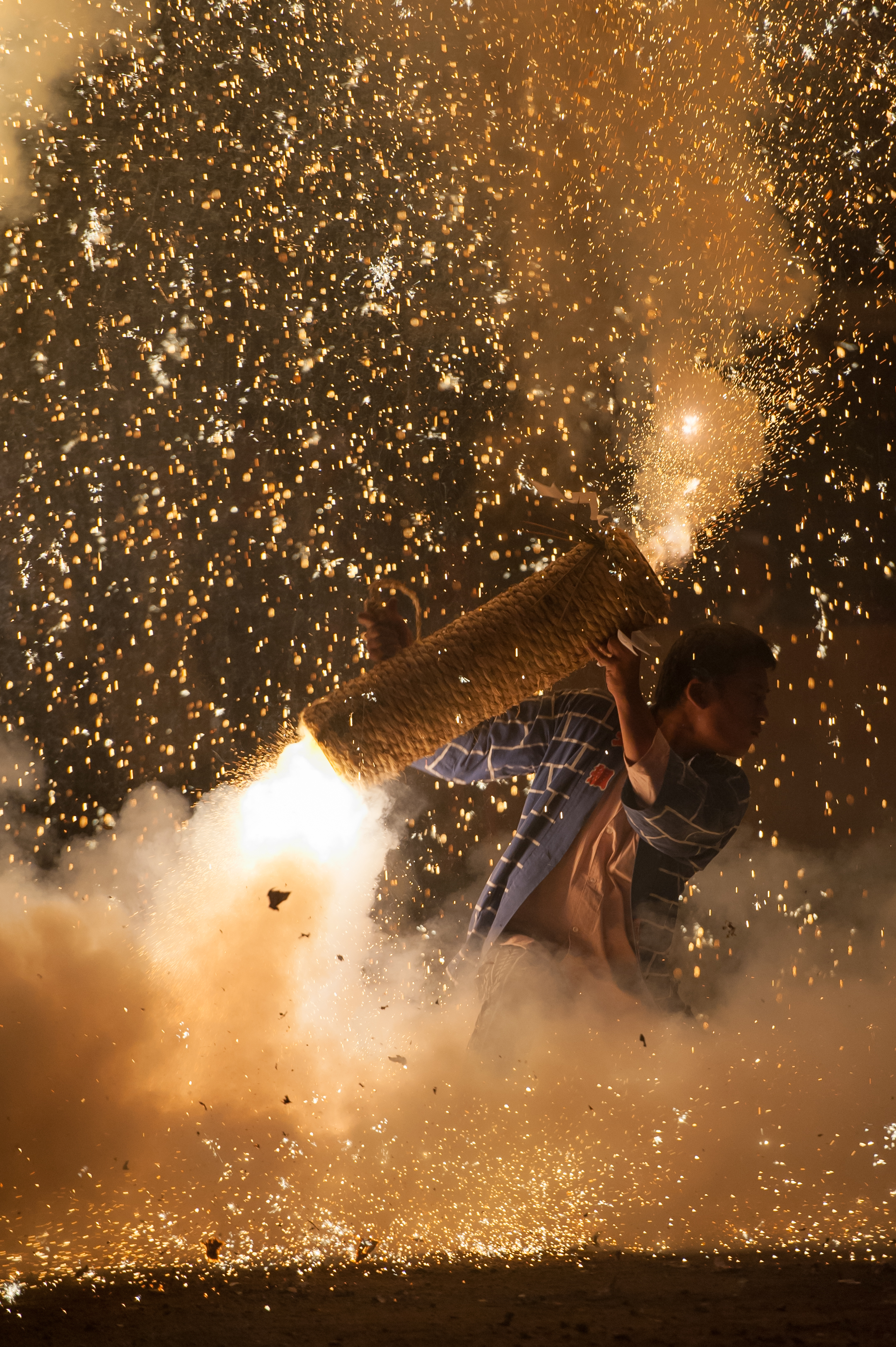
The hane

Tezutsu-hanabi (Japanese: 手筒花火) is a type of traditional Japanese pyrotechnic device and fireworks projector similar to a flamethrower.

== History ==
The chronicle Mikawa no kuni korō den (三河国古老伝) preserved at Toyohashi Yoshida Shrine records the first use of fireworks in Mikawa in 1558. Pyrotechnic signal flares and rockets were used during the Sengoku period. The Kyūchū hisaku (宮中秘策) of 1741 states that tezutsu-hanabi were demonstrated to Tokugawa Ieyasu at Edo Castle in 1613, just before the Siege of Osaka. It is believed that the gunnery corps of the Tokugawa clan brought back knowledge of pyrotechnics when they returned to Mikawa Province in the early 17th century. Ieyasu entrusted his retainers from Mikawa, the Mikawa-shū, with the mass production of gunpowder, and because of this, it is said, Mikawa became the home of many advances in pyrotechnics.

Tezutsu-hanabi are prepared for many shrine festivals, including those at Toyokawa's Utari Shrine and Gifu's Tejikarao Shrine, a shrine to Amenotajikarao, where they have been used since at least the 1760s.

== Characteristics of the tezutsu-hanabi projector ==
Tezutsu-hanabi are prepared by local amateurs who have obtained a license to do so. Structurally, the projector is a roughly 80 cm (31 in) long cartridge made of mōsō bamboo reinforced with tightly bound rope and packed with a mixture of slow-burning gunpowder and iron powder. When the fuse is lit, a jet of fire is released while the projector is held in a daunting pose. The jet of fire typically reaches 1200–1500 °C (2192–2732 °F). At the end of the performance, the projector is hefted and flipped around as the bottom explodes in a brief secondary ignition called a hane (跳ね). However, in some regions including Shizuoka, the hane may be less dramatic or absent altogether.

== See also ==
- Wooden cannon
