= Shooting Star =

Shooting star refers to a meteor.

Shooting star or shooting stars may also refer to:

== Film, television, and theater ==
=== Film ===
- Shooting Star (2015 film), a 2015 Bulgarian short film
- Shooting Star (2020 film), a 2020 Canadian short film
- Shooting Stars (1927 film), a 1927 British drama
- Shooting Stars (1950 film)
- Shooting Stars (1952 film), a 1952 West German drama
- Shooting Stars (1983 film), a 1983 television film, starring Billy Dee Williams
- Shooting Stars (1997 film) (Le ciel est à nous), a 1997 French comedy produced by Richard Sadler
- Shooting Stars (2023 film), a 2023 sports drama

=== Television ===
==== Series ====
- Shooting Star, a 2020 television series by 41 Entertainment
- Shooting Stars (South Korean TV series), a 2022 South Korean television show
- Shooting Stars (British TV series), a British comedy television show
- Shooting Stars (Singaporean TV series), a 2005 Singaporean TV drama

==== Episodes ====
- "Shooting Star" (Glee), 2013
- "Shooting Star" (The Hunting Wives), 2025
- "The Shooting Star" (The Adventures of Tintin)
- "The Shooting Star" (Ben & Holly's Little Kingdom), 2012
- "The Shooting Star" (Dot.), 2017
- "The Shooting Star" (Nate Is Late), 2018
- "The Shooting Star" (Power Rangers Zeo), 1996
- "The Shooting Star", an episode of The Animal Shelf, 2000
- "Shooting Stars" (CSI), 2005

=== Plays and other entertainment uses ===
- Shooting Star, a play by Steven Dietz
- Shooting Stars, a play by Molly Newman
- Star Trek: Phaser Strike (called Shooting Star in Germany, Italy and UK), a 1979 video game for the Microvision
- Shooting Stars Award, annually presented to 10 young European actors at the Berlin International Film Festival
- The Shooting Star, the name of Racer X's car in Mach GoGoGo media

== Literature ==
- Shooting Stars, a 2016 novel by Brian Falkner
- Shooting Star, a 1958 novel by Robert Bloch
- Shooting Star (Temple novel), by Australian Peter Temple
- The Shooting Star, a 1942 Tintin adventure
- Shooting Star (comics), a character from Marvel Comics

== Music ==
=== Albums ===
- Shooting Star (Elkie Brooks album) or the title song, 1978
- Shooting Star (Rachael Leahcar album) or the title song, 2012
- Shooting Star (Shooting Star album), 1980
- Shooting Star, by David Courtney, 2005
- Shooting Star (EP), by Owl City, or the title song (see below), 2012
- Shooting Stars (album), by Dollar, or the title song ("Shooting Star"), 1979

=== Songs ===
- "Shooting Star" (Air Traffic song), 2007
- "Shooting Star" (Bad Company song), 1975
- "Shooting Star" (Bang! song), 1998; covered by Flip & Fill, 2002
- "Shooting Star" (Bob Dylan song), 1989
- "Shooting Star" (David Rush song), 2009
- "Shooting Star" (Deepest Blue song), 2004
- "Shooting Star" (Disney song), from the film Hercules, 1997
- "Shooting Star" (Modern Talking song), 2006
- "Shooting Star" (Owl City song), 2012
- "Shooting Star" (Poison song), 2002
- "Shooting Star" (Tara McDonald song), 2013
- "Shooting Star" (XG song), 2023
- "Shooting Stars" (Bag Raiders song), 2009
- "Shooting Stars" (Dragon song), 1977
- "Shooting Star", by Amy Diamond from This Is Me Now, 2005
- "Shooting Star", by Audrey Hobert from Who's the Clown?, 2025
- "Shooting Star", by Cross Gene, 2013
- "Shooting Star", by Carly Rae Jepsen from The Loneliest Time, 2022
- "Shooting Star", by Cliff Richard and the Shadows from the film Thunderbirds Are Go, 1966
- "Shooting Star", by Elliott Smith from From a Basement on the Hill, 2004
- "Shooting Star", by Elton John from A Single Man, 1978
- "Shooting Star", by everset, Kamen Rider Meteor's theme on the series Kamen Rider Fourze
- "Shooting Star", by Expatriate from In the Midst of This, 2007
- "Shooting Star", by Gene Clark from Roadmaster, 1973
- "Shooting Star", by Harry Chapin from Verities & Balderdash, 1974
- "Shooting Star", by Heavy Stereo, 1996
- "Shooting Star", by Lou Reed from Street Hassle, 1978
- "Shooting Star", by the Mamas & the Papas from People Like Us, 1971
- "Shooting Star", by Muna from Muna, 2022
- "Shooting Star", by Órla Fallon from Distant Shore, 2009
- "Shooting Star", by Sacha, 2025
- "Shooting Star", by VIXX from Kratos, 2016
- "The Shooting Star", by Gojira from Magma, 2016
- "Shooting Stars", by Kelis from Wanderland, 2001

=== Performers ===
- Shooting Star (band), an American rock band

== Science and mathematics ==
- Hypervelocity star, a type of star that moves at unusually high velocities across the galaxy
- Primula sect. Dodecatheon, a group of herbaceous flowering plants in the genus Primula
- Primula pauciflora, also known as pretty shooting star, few-flowered shooting star, dark throat shooting star and prairie shooting star

== Sport ==
- Shooting Stars F.C., a Nigerian football club
- NBA All-Star Weekend Shooting Stars Competition, a basketball competition
- A professional wrestling aerial technique

== Transportation ==
- P-80 Shooting Star, a US Army Air Forces jet fighter
- T-33 Shooting Star, an American-built jet trainer
- Shooting Star (clipper), an extreme clipper ship built in 1851
- Another 1851 extreme clipper, USS Ino, which served in the Civil War. It was renamed Shooting Star in 1867
- A BR 'Britannia' class steam locomotive
- A GWR Star Class, steam locomotive
- A logo displayed on many Hokutosei locomotives, including:
  - JNR Class DD51, a diesel-hydraulic locomotive type operated in Japan since 1962
  - JR Freight Class EF510, a multi-voltage AC/DC electric locomotive type operated in Japan since 2002

== Other uses ==
- Shooting Star (spacecraft), an expendable cargo module for the Dream Chaser spacecraft
- Shooting Star (drone), quadcopter drone by Intel
- Tecumseh (1768–1813), whose Shawnee name has been translated as Shooting Star
- Shooting Star Casino, in Minnesota
- Bay 101 Shooting Star, a World Poker Tour tournament
- Shooting star (candlestick pattern), in finance
- Shooting Star Tommy Gun, a carnival amusement game
- Shooting Star, Ace's aircraft from the arcade games TwinBee Yahho! and Sexy Parodius
- Shooting Stars (board game), 1980

== See also ==
- Falling star (disambiguation)
- Ryūsei (disambiguation)
