= Longjing =

Longjing may refer to:

Tea

- Longjing tea (龙井茶), a variety of green tea from Hangzhou, Zhejiang
  - Longjing, Hangzhou (龙井村), production site of Longjing tea, located in Hangzhou

City and town

- Longjing, Jilin (龙井市), county-level city of Yanbian Prefecture, Jilin

Townships (龙井乡)

- Longjing Township, Wushan County, Chongqing, in Wushan County, Chongqing
- Longjing Township, Renhuai, in Renhuai City, Guizhou
- Longjing Township, Shiqian County, in Shiqian County, Guizhou

District

- Longjing, Taichung (龍井區), Taiwan

Station

- Longjing railway station (龍井車站), a railway station on the Taiwan Railway Administration Western Line

Food

- Longjing prawns (龙井虾仁), specialty of Hangzhou, produced using the meat of live river prawns

== See also ==
- Ryūsei (disambiguation)
