= Falling Star =

Falling Star(s) or The Falling Star may refer to:

- Meteor or falling star, the visible passage of a glowing meteoroid through Earth's atmosphere

== Film and television ==
=== Films ===
- The Falling Star, a 1950 German drama film directed by Harald Braun
- Falling Star (film), a 2014 Spanish historical film

=== Television episodes ===
- "Falling Stars", a 1963 episode of 77 Sunset Strip
- "Falling Star", a 1996 episode of 12 O'Clock High
- "A Falling Star", a 1966 episode of My Little Sons
- "Falling Star", a 1968 episode of Mannix season 1
- "Falling Star", a 1979 episode of Mrs. Columbo
- "Falling Stars", a 1990 episode of Island Son
- "Falling Star" (The Outer Limits), a 1996 episode
- "Hercules and the Falling Stars", a 1998 episode of Hercules (1998)
- "Falling Stars", a 2001 episode of Rugrats
- "Falling Star" (General Hospital: Night Shift), a 2007 episode

== Music ==
- The Falling Star, an album by B! Machine, 2007
- "Falling Stars" (Lidia Isac song), 2015
- "Falling Stars" (Sunset Strippers song), 2005
- "Falling Stars", a song by Serj Tankian from Elect the Dead Symphony, 2010
- "Falling Stars", a song by Joe Satriani from Shapeshifting, 2020
- "Falling Star", a song by Robert Forster from Calling from a Country Phone, 1993
- "A Fallen Star", a song written by James Joiner, 1957
  - "Fallen Star", version of the Joiner song by Eileen Reed, 1964

== Other uses ==
- "Falling Star", a section of Star Wars Tales Volume 4
- Falling Stars (video game), a 2007 role-playing game
- Crocosmia aurea or falling stars, a perennial flowering plant

== See also ==
- Fallen Star
- Shooting Star (disambiguation)
