= Ryūsei =

Ryūsei, Ryusei or Ryuusei may refer to:

== Vehicles ==
- Aichi B7A Ryūsei (流星, Shooting star), a World War II Japanese bomber
- OREX Ryūsei (りゅうせい, Shooting star), a NASDA reentry demonstrator
- SS Ryūsei Maru (隆西), a Japanese transport ship during World War II

== Other ==
- Ryūsei (given name), a masculine Japanese given name
- Ryusei (competition) (竜星, Dragon star), a Go competition
- Ryūsei / Sharirara (流星/シャリララ), a single by Japanese rock band FLOW
- Ryusei (song), a CD single by Sandaime J Soul Brothers from Exile Tribe
- Ryūsei-ha, a Japanese school of ikebana
- Ryūsei (rocket) (龍勢), a type of gunpowder rocket used in medieval Japan

== See also ==
- Longjing (disambiguation), Ryūsei in Japanese
