= Ryusei Furukawa =

Japanese painter

- Born: 10 June 1893; Oyama, Japan
- Died: 23 May 1968 (aged 74); Hayama, Japan
- Occupation: Painter

Ryusei Furukawa (10 June 1893 – 23 May 1968) was a Japanese painter. His work was part of the painting event in the art competition at the 1932 Summer Olympics.

== Biography ==
He was born in Ōaza Hakawa, Kuwamura, Shimotsuga District, Tochigi Prefecture (present-day Hakawa, Oyama City). He attended Tochigi Prefectural Utsunomiya Middle School and Zushi Kaisei Middle School. At the age of 25, he entered the preparatory course for the Japanese Painting department at the Tokyo School of Fine Arts (present-day Tokyo University of the Arts). He graduated from the Japanese Painting department in 1924. After graduation, he focused on printmaking, and in the same year, his woodblock print was selected for exhibition at the 6th Japan Creative Print Association exhibition. After graduating, he worked as a teacher while creating artworks, which he exhibited with the Japan Creative Print Association and the Shun'yōkai.

For the art competitions at the 1932 Los Angeles Olympics, he submitted works titled "A Pose of a Woman Golfer (in Reposing)" and "A Pose of a Woman Golfer (in Striking)" (the Japanese titles for both are unknown). For the 1936 Berlin Olympics art competition, he submitted a work titled "Golf".

His work "Insect Caricature Scroll" was purchased by the Louvre Museum at the Contemporary Japanese Printmaking Exhibition held in Paris in 1934. Furthermore, some of the exhibited works are held in the collection of the Bibliothèque nationale de France.

In 1937, he halted his artistic work due to illness and convalescence. Later, in 1944, with the intensification of the war, he evacuated to his hometown of Hakawa, where he contributed to local agricultural development.

He resumed printmaking in 1951 and continued until his death in 1968.
