= Ryusei Sugano =

Japanese footballer

Personal information
- Date of birth: 3 November 2002 (age 24)
- Place of birth: Nara, Japan
- Height: 1.74 m (5 ft 9 in)
- Position: Midfielder

Team information
- Current team: Gamba Osaka

Youth career
- YF Nara Tesoro
- Osaka Jeunesse FC
- –: Gamba Osaka

Senior career*
Years	Team	Apps	(Gls)
2020	Gamba Osaka U-23	23	(1)
- * Club domestic league appearances and goals as of 17:04, 17 March 2021 (UTC)

Ryusei Sugano (菅野 隆星, Sugano Ryusei; born 3 November 2002) is a Japanese footballer currently playing as a midfielder for Gamba Osaka U-23.

== Career statistics ==
=== Club ===
As of 17 March 2021.

Club	Season	League			National Cup		League Cup		Other		Total	
Club	Season	Division	Apps	Goals	Apps	Goals	Apps	Goals	Apps	Goals	Apps	Goals
Gamba Osaka U-23	2020	J3 League	23	1	–		–		0	0	23	1
Career total			23	1	0	0	0	0	0	0	23	1
