= Bō-hiya =

Japanese fire arrow cannon

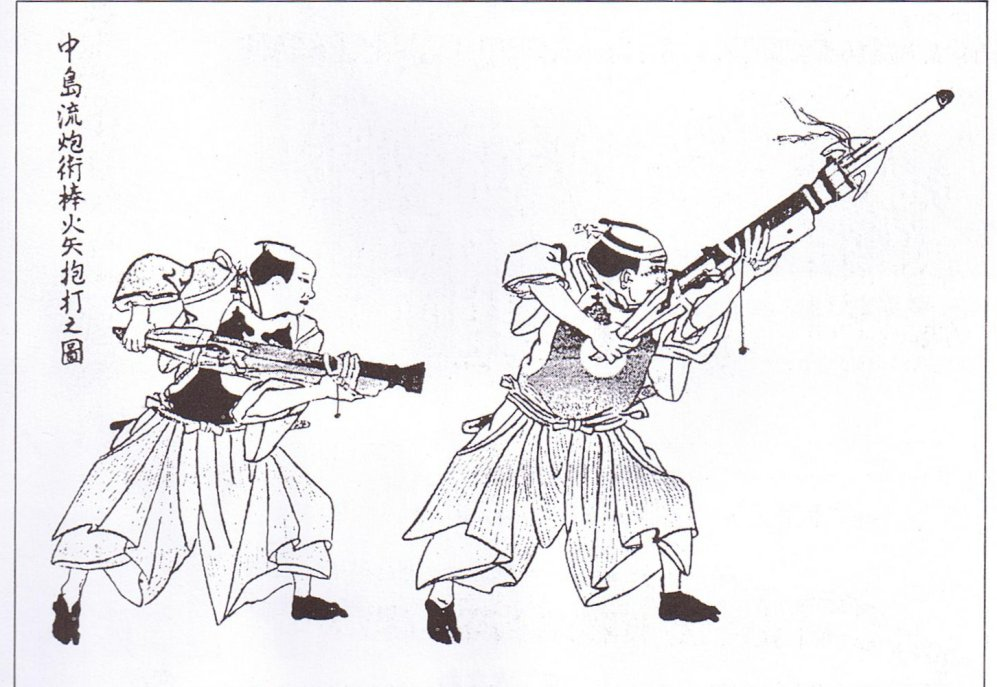
An Edo period wood block print showing samurai gunners firing bo-hiya with hiya-zutsu (fire arrow guns)

A bō-hiya (棒火矢) was a Japanese arrow-launching cannon and development of the fire arrow.

== History and description ==
Fire arrows of some type have been used in Japan as far back as the 6th century where they are said to have been used during a military campaign in Korea. Bows (yumi) were used to launch these early fire arrows.

In 10th-century China, gunpowder was used to launch fire arrows, and this type of fire arrow was used against the Japanese by Mongolian naval vessels in the 13th century.

In 1543, the Japanese acquired matchlock technology from the Portuguese, and the resulting firearms developed by the Japanese led to new means of launching fire arrows. These rocket-like bo-hiya had the appearance of a thick arrow with large fins, a wood shaft and a metal tip; they resembled the Korean chongtong, an arrow-firing cannon. Bo-hiya were ignited by lighting a fuse made from incendiary waterproof rope which was wrapped around the shaft; when lit the bo-hiya was launched from either a wide-bore cannon, a form of tanegashima (Japanese matchlock) called hiya zutsu, or from a mortar-like weapon (hiya taihou). By the 16th century, Japanese pirates were reported to have used Bō-hiya. During one sea battle involving the pirates, it was said the Bō-hiya were "falling like rain". Bo-hiya were standard equipment on Japanese military vessels, where they were used to set fire to enemy ships.

== Gallery ==
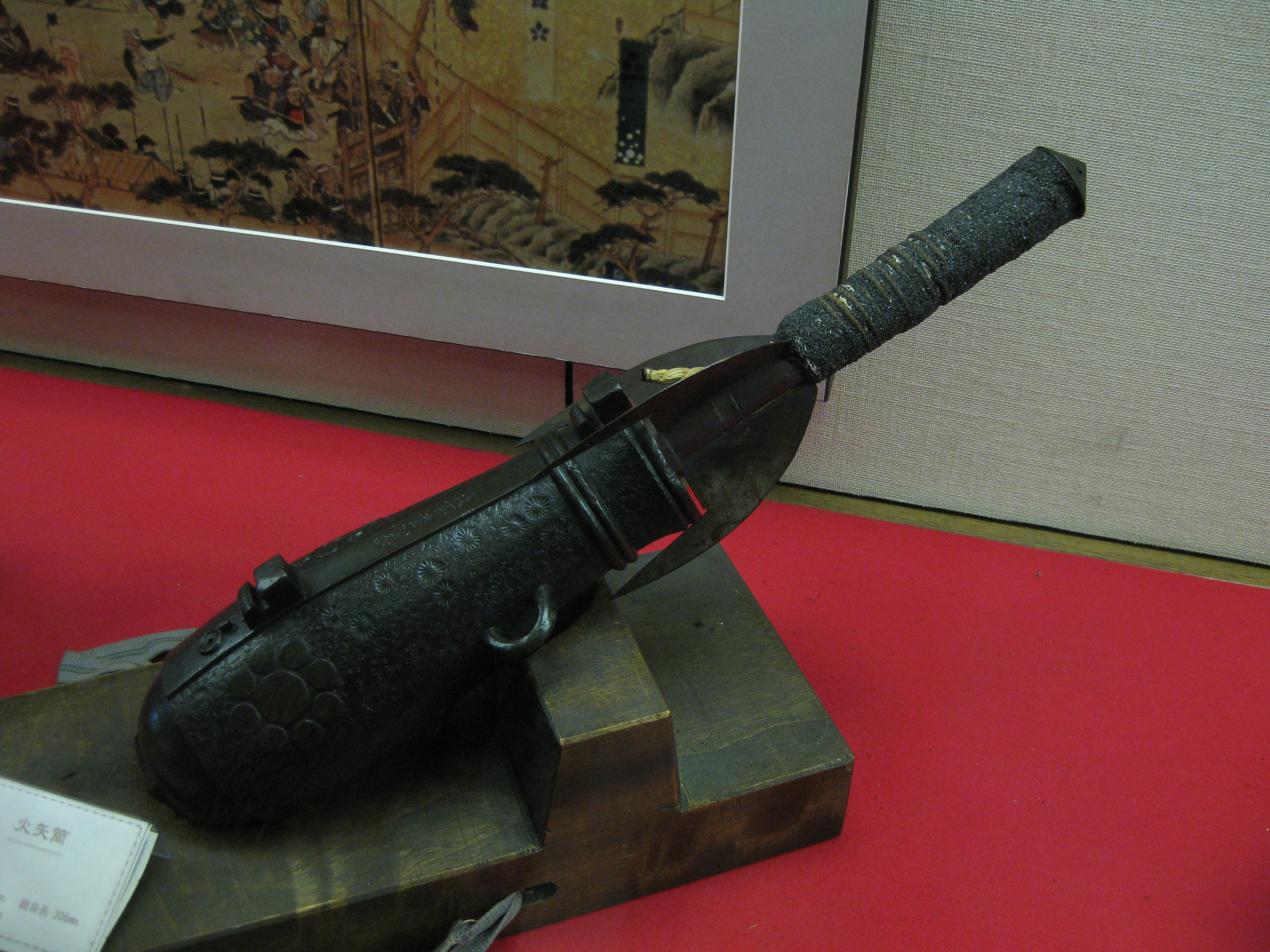
Antique Japanese (samurai) bo hiya or bohiya and hiya taihou (fire arrow cannon), Matsumoto Castle, in Nagano prefecture, Japan

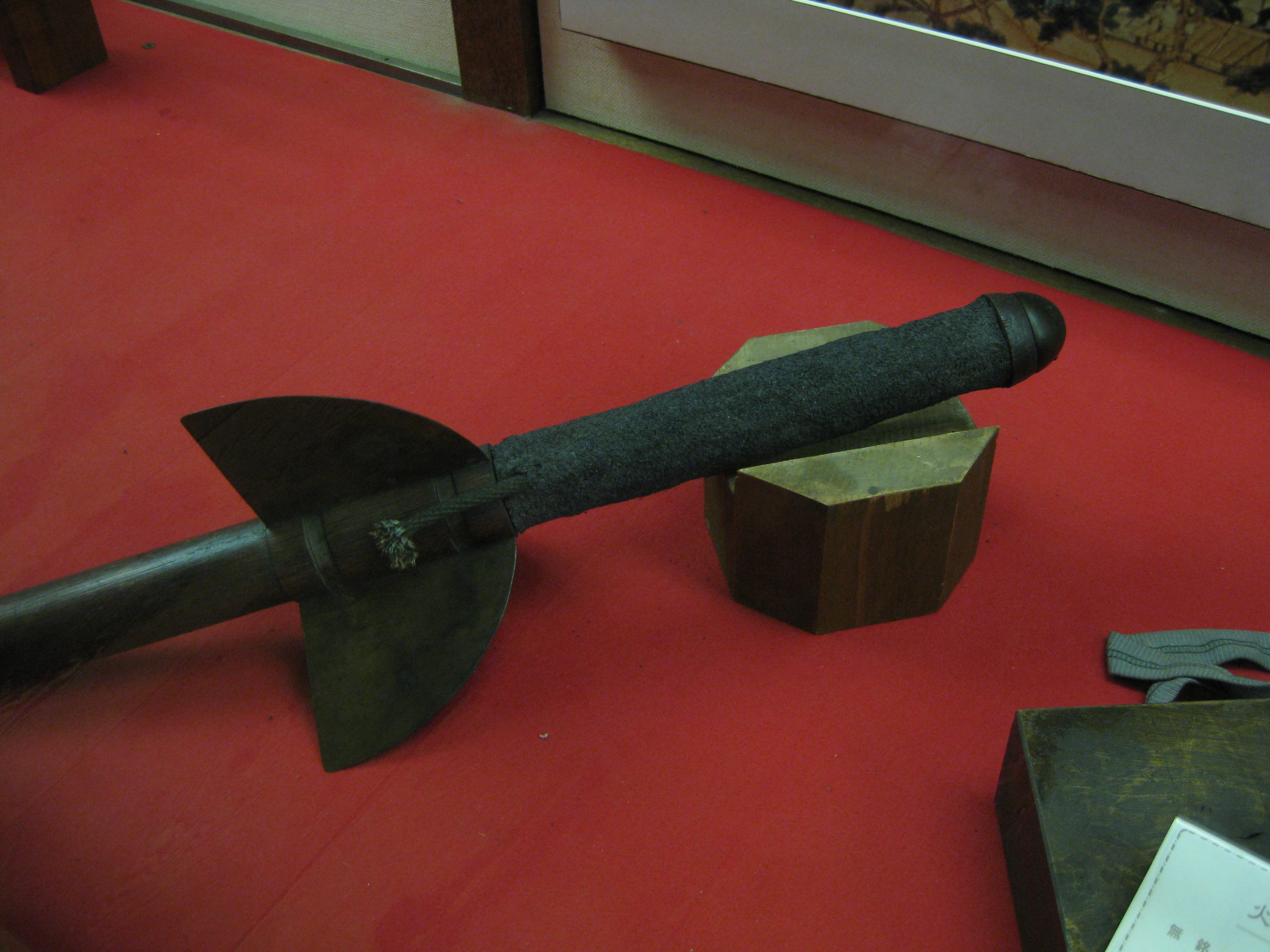
Antique Japanese (samurai) bohiya or bo hiya, showing the fuse, Matsumoto Castle, in Nagano prefecture, Japan

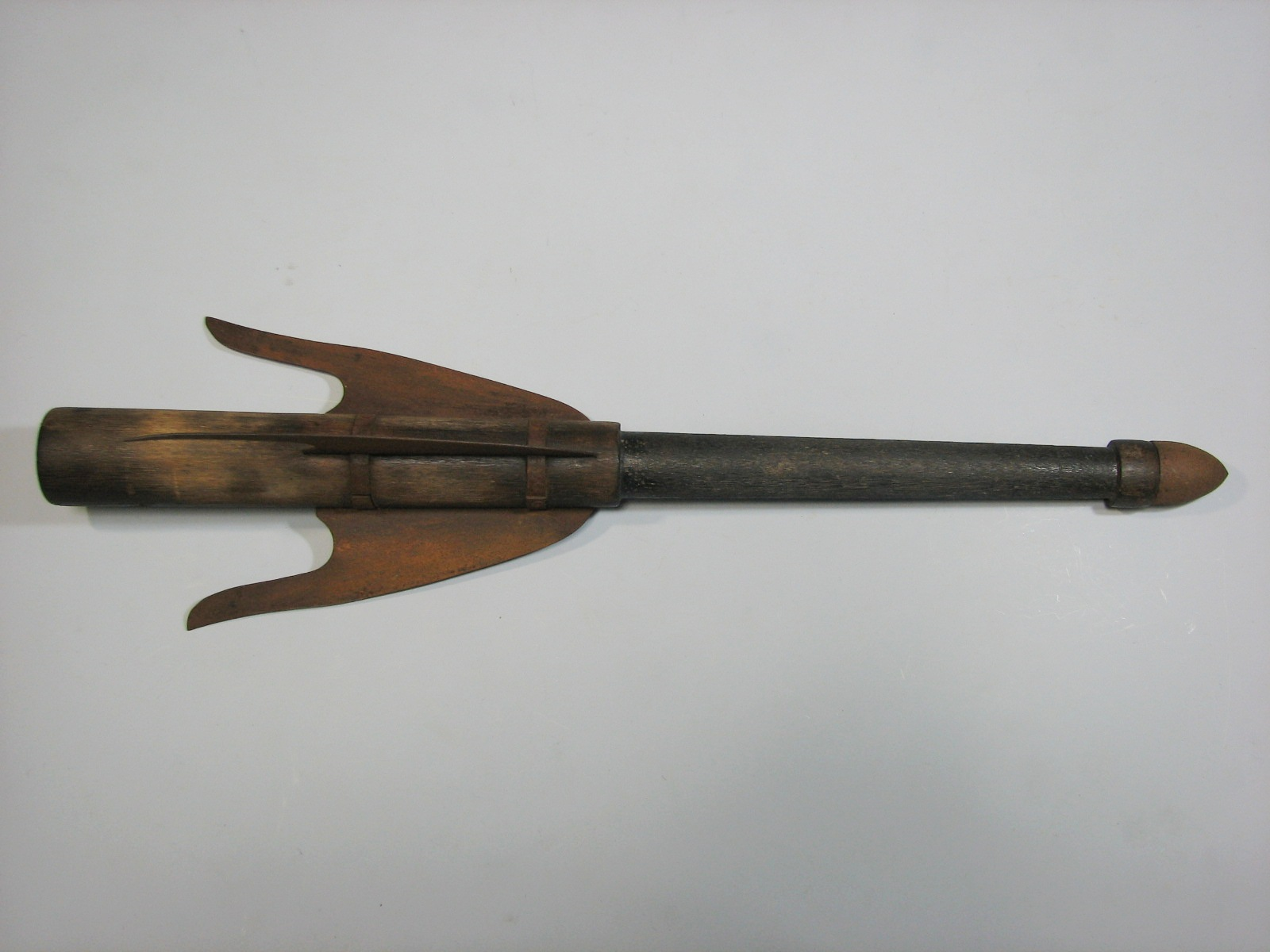
Bo-hiya

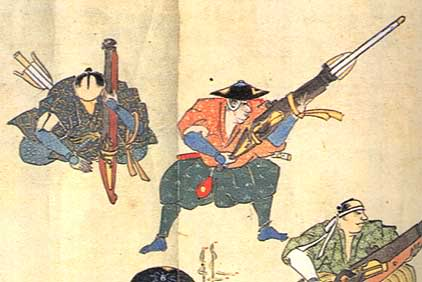
An Edo period wood block print showing samurai gunners using hiya zutsu (fire arrow guns) to fire bo-hiya

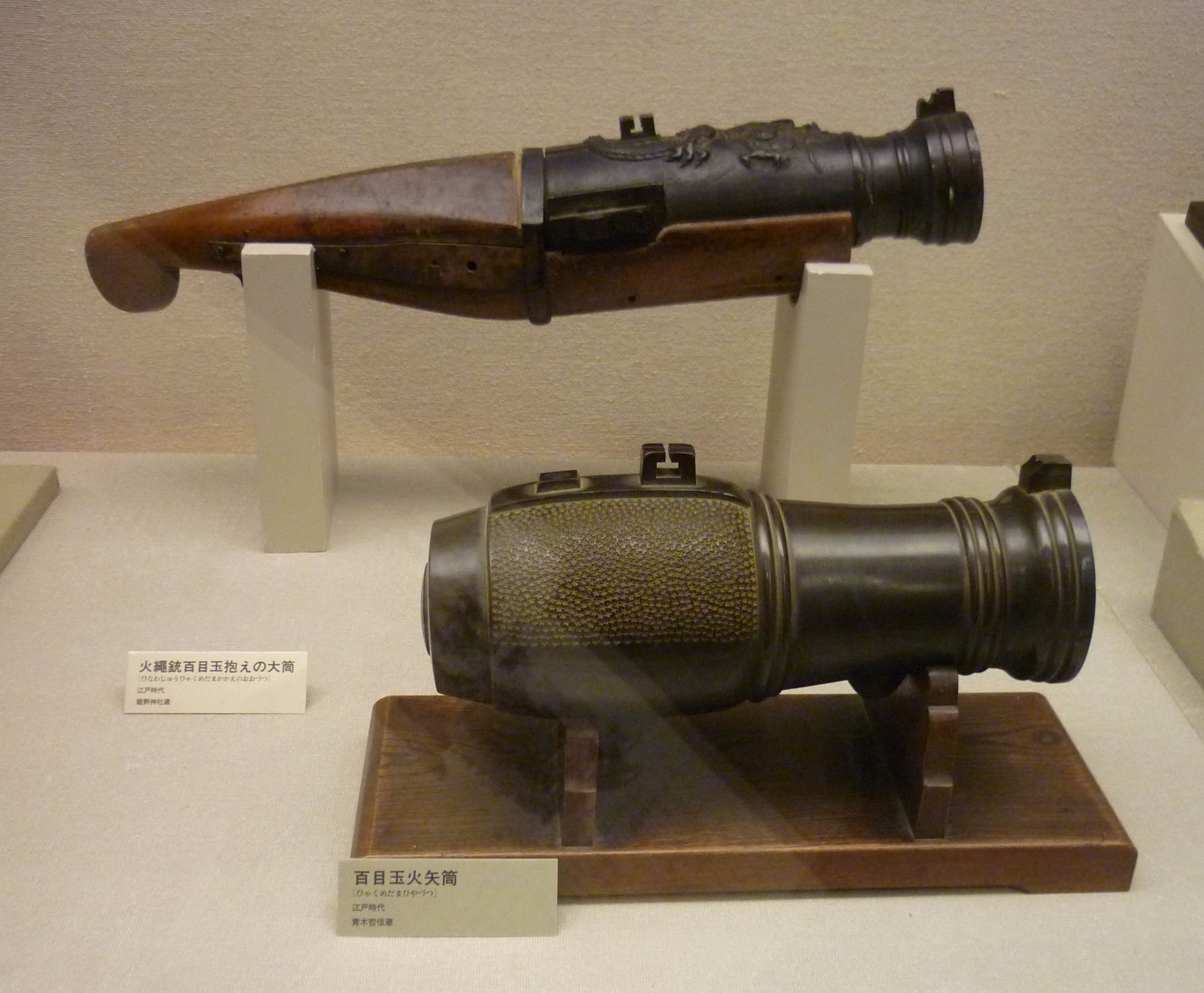
Bo-hiya (fire arrow), ancient Japanese weapon also known as hiya taihou (fire arrow cannon)

== See also ==
- Rifle grenade
- Ryūsei (signal rocket)
- Chongtong
- Mysorean rockets
- Shoulder-fired missile
