= Ryūsei (rocket) =

Traditional wooden rocket

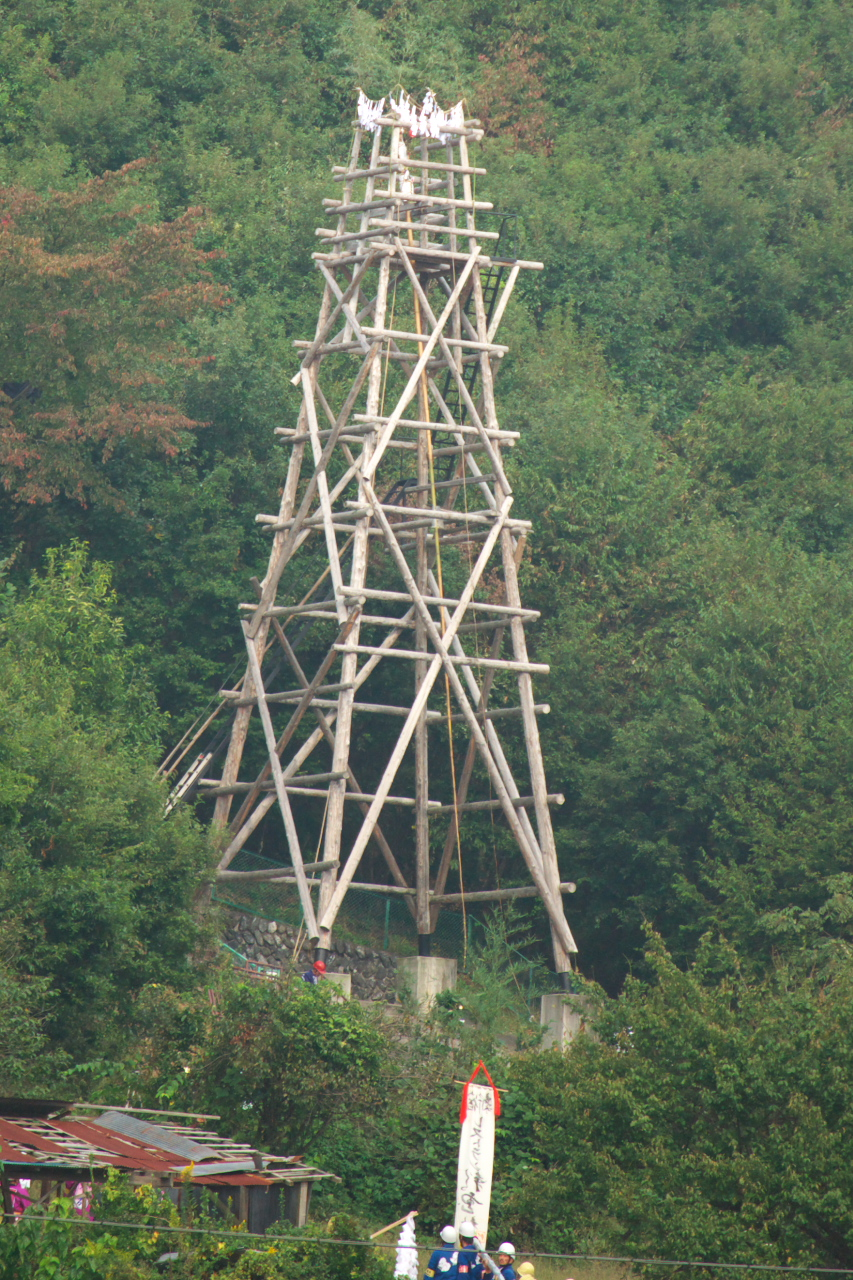
A ryūsei launch scaffold in Chichibu

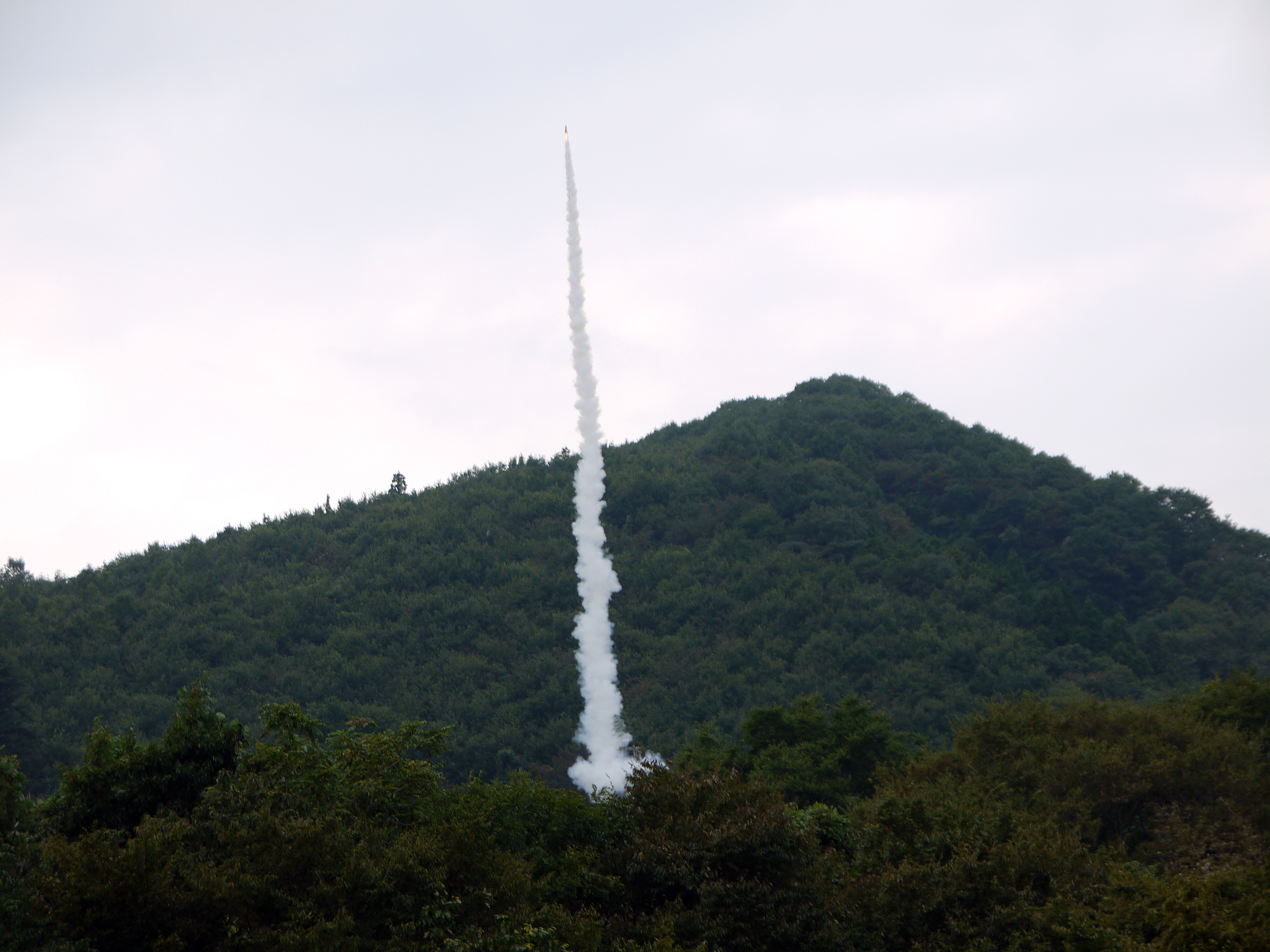
A ryūsei in flight

A ryūsei (龍勢) is a type of traditional Japanese rocket.

== Summary ==
A ryūsei fuselage is made from either bound planks of pine softwood or a section of bamboo, and it is propelled by the combustion of gunpowder. The particular type of gunpowder used in ryūsei is formulated to burn slowly.

Ryūsei are believed to have been developed by reverse engineering primitive Chinese gunpowder rockets left behind by the defeated Yuan armies after the Mongol invasions of Japan in the 13th century. However, there is another theory that ryūsei were invented locally by Japanese peasants. Because of this, they are sometimes called farmers' rockets (農民ロケット). In the 16th century, ryūsei rockets were used as smoke signals, and documents preserved at Muku Shrine record the launch of a ryūsei in 1575.

== Ryūsei in later times ==
After the Second World War and occupation, American-directed bans on private possession of gunpowder nearly caused the extinction of ryūsei. After many petitions, gunpowder for ryūsei was finally legalized again in 1972.

In Chichibu, a number of ryūsei from different areas of Japan are on display at the Ryūsei Kaikan (龍勢会館) roadside station.

In order to reduce the risk of a forest fire in case of accidental explosion, modern workshops for manufacturing ryūsei are made of fireproof concrete and have no electricity. If the fuselage is not properly constructed and cannot withstand the force of the ignition, the rocket may explode on the launch scaffold in what is known as a tsutsuppane (筒っ跳ね). Because they are manufactured by amateurs, there are often cases of tsutsuppane and other launch failures. For this reason, when a launch is successful, it is customarily followed by a banzai shout.

This type of rocket is mentioned in the metaphorical phrase, to "start like a ryūsei and end like a stick" (龍勢のように始まり、棒のように終わる), referring to something with an exciting beginning but an anticlimactic finish.

== See also ==
- Bō-hiya
- Skyrocket
- Tezutsu-hanabi
- Rocket Festival
