= Ryūsei-ha =

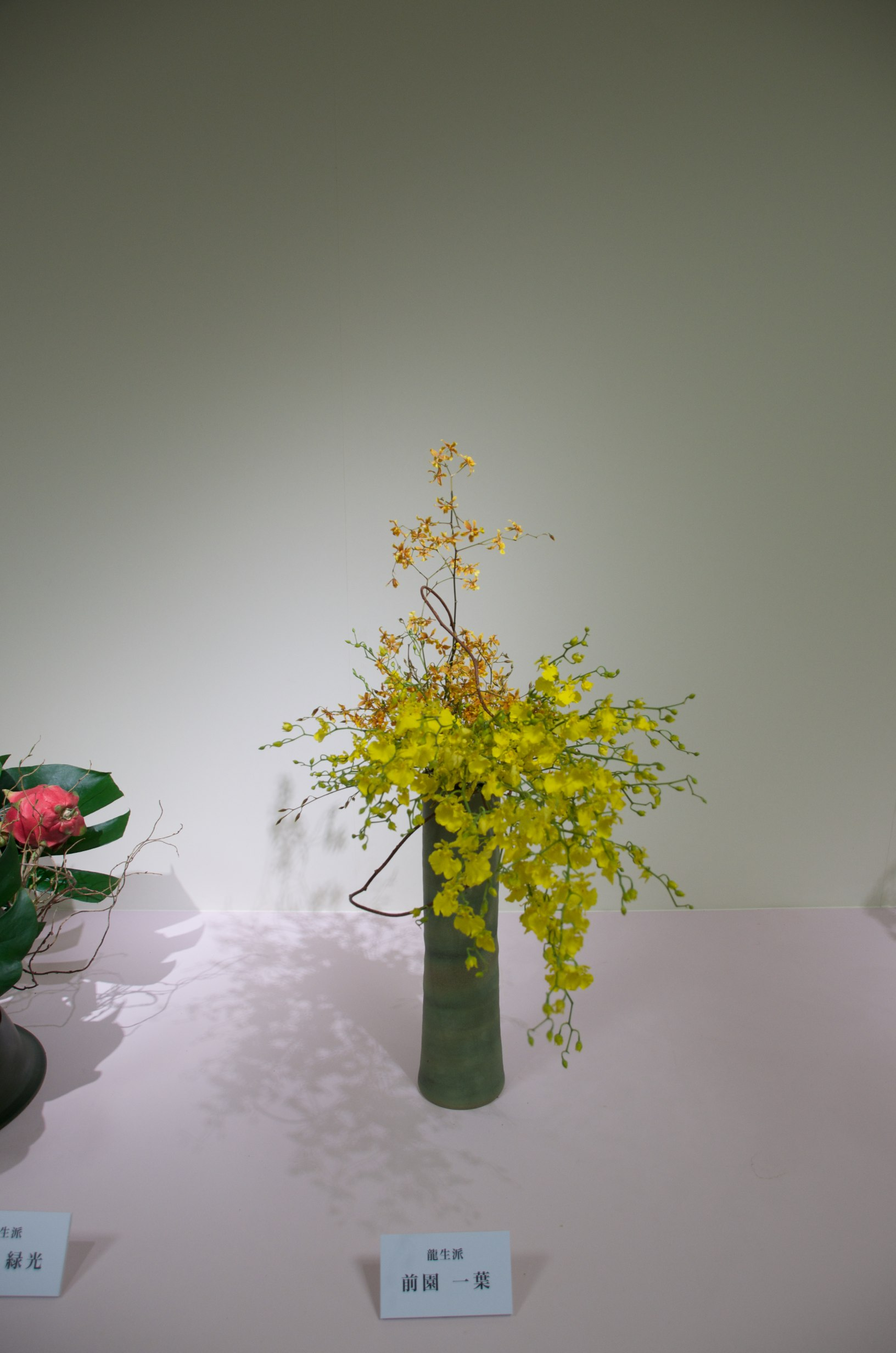
Ryūsei-ha arrangement

Ryūsei-ha (龍生派) is a Japanese school of ikebana.
