= Tejikarao Shrine =

Shinto shrine in Gifu Prefecture, Japan

Tejikarao Shrine 手力雄神社
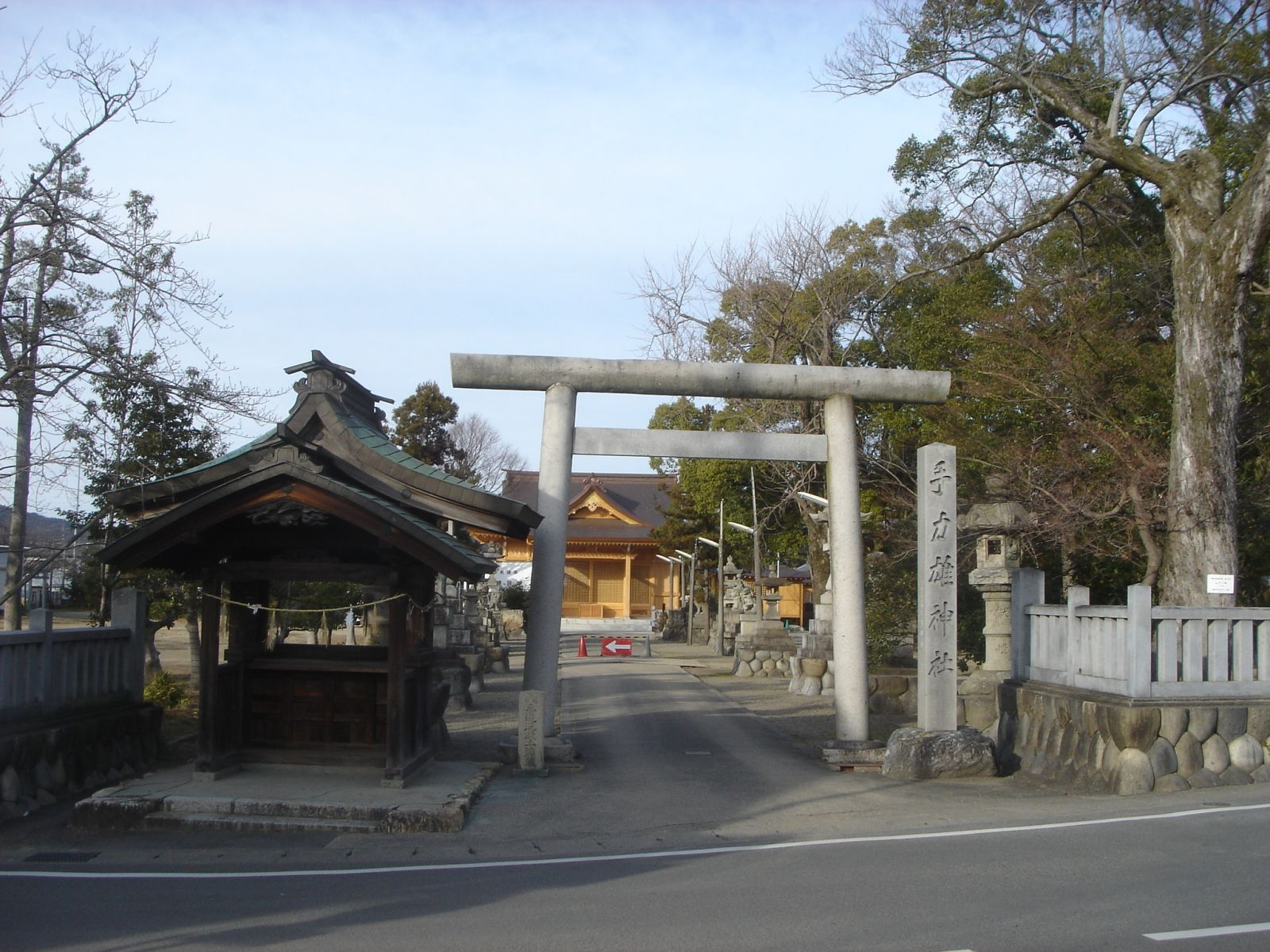
- Tejikarao Shrine entrance

- Location within Japan

Religion
- Affiliation: Shinto
- Deity: Ame-no-tejikarao

Location
- Location: 6-8-22 Kuranomae; Gifu, Gifu Prefecture, Japan
- Coordinates: 35°23′44.57″N 136°48′19.23″E

Architecture
- Established: 860

Tejikarao Shrine (手力雄神社, Tejikarao Jinja) is a Shinto shrine located in the city of Gifu, Gifu Prefecture, Japan.

== History ==
This shrine was originally built in 860. During the Middle Ages, it was at a strategic location in Mino Province, which led to it being the site of many battles. At the time of the Battle of Sekigahara in 1600, the Oda clan used this shrine as their place of prayer. When they were attacked by the forces of Tokugawa Ieyasu, part of the temple was burned to the ground.

== Major Rituals ==
- February 22: Yearly prayers
- Second Saturday of April: Spring Fire Festival
- October 10: Fall Fire Festival
- November 22: Niiname Festival
