= Trigun Stampede =

Japanese anime television series

- Key visual
- Genre: Space Western
- Created by: Yasuhiro Nightow
- Anime television series
- Directed by: Kenji Mutō
- Produced by: Katsuhiro Takei
- Written by: Tatsurō Inamoto; Shin Okashima; Yoshihisa Ueda
- Music by: Tatsuya Kato
- Studio: Orange
- Licensed by: Crunchyroll; SEA: Medialink
- Original network: TXN (TV Tokyo), AT-X
- Original run: January 7, 2023 – March 25, 2023
- Episodes: 12
- Anime television series

Trigun Stargaze
- Directed by: Masako Satō
- Written by: Kazuyuki Fudeyasu
- Music by: Tatsuya Kato
- Studio: Orange
- Licensed by: Crunchyroll
- Original network: TXN (TV Tokyo)
- Original run: January 10, 2026 – March 28, 2026
- Episodes: 12
- icon

Trigun Stampede (stylized in all caps) is a Japanese anime television series, serving as the second and reimagined adaptation of the manga series Trigun by Yasuhiro Nightow. Animated by studio Orange, the series' first part aired from January to March 2023. A sequel, titled Trigun Stargaze, aired from January to March 2026.

== Plot ==
In the far future, Earth has become uninhabitable, forcing humanity to evacuate in massive colony fleets to search for habitable planets. In order to sustain the fleets and the colonies they will eventually build, humanity also created plants, artificial organic lifeforms that can produce infinite, clean energy. In one colony fleet, two brothers named Vash and Knives are born with a special connection to plants and are cared for by a woman named Rem Saverem. However, the colony fleet's computer systems suddenly malfunction, causing the entire fleet to crash land on the arid planet of Noman's Land. Rem sacrifices herself to save Vash and Knives, but Vash is horrified to learn that Knives was responsible for the disaster, as he seeks to kill all humans for exploiting plants.

Many years later, the survivors of the colony fleet have built several cities on Noman's Land's surface, being totally dependent on plants to survive the hostile conditions. A now adult Vash wanders the desert aimlessly, having been branded a dangerous outlaw nicknamed "Vash the Stampede" or the "Humanoid Typhoon", while Knives continues his schemes and has taken up the nickname "Millions Knives". As Vash tries to find a way to peacefully resolve the differences between humans and plants, he runs into investigative reporters Meryl Stryfe and Roberto De Niro, marking the starting point of a new adventure for the three of them.

== Voice cast ==
Character	Japanese voice	English voice
Main characters
Vash the Stampede	Yoshitsugu Matsuoka; Tomoyo Kurosawa (young)	Johnny Yong Bosch; Kristen McGuire (young)
Nicholas D. Wolfwood	Yoshimasa Hosoya	David Matranga
Meryl Stryfe	Sakura Ando	Sarah Roach
Milly Thompson	Chika Ayamori	Alexis Tipton
Millions Knives	Junya Ikeda (first voice); Ryūji Satō (second voice); Yumiri Hanamori (young)	Austin Tindle; Megan Shipman (young)
Legato Bluesummers	Koki Uchiyama	Daman Mills
Roberto De Niro	Kenji Matsuda	Ben Bryant
Gung-Ho Guns
Monev the Gale	Chikahiro Kobayashi	Ray Hurd
E.G. Mine	Wataru Takagi	Mike McFarland
Leonof the Puppet-Master	Chō	Paul Taylor
Hoppered the Gauntlet	Taketora	Reagan Murdock
Midvalley the Hornfreak	Shin-ichiro Miki	—
Gray the Ninelives	Kento Fujinuma	—
Zazie the Beast	Tarako (first voice); Minami Takayama (second voice)	Madeleine Morris
Livio the Double Fang	Genki Muro	Patrick McAlister
Elendira the Crimsonnail	Ayumu Murase	Molly Searcy
Other characters
Rem Saverem	Maaya Sakamoto	Emily Fajardo
William Conrad	Ryūsei Nakao	Larry Brantley
Luida	Fumiko Orikasa	Katelyn Barr
Brad	Junichi Suwabe	Christopher Wehkamp

== Production ==
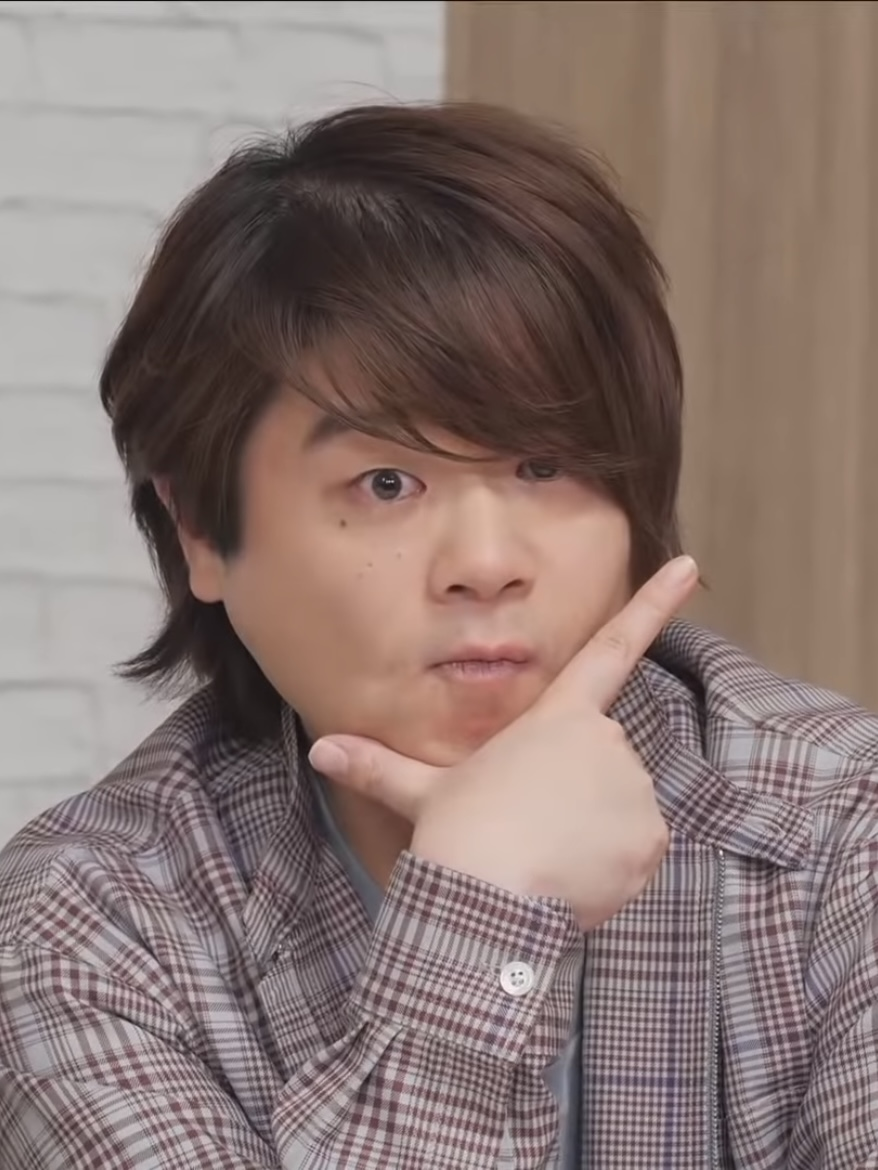
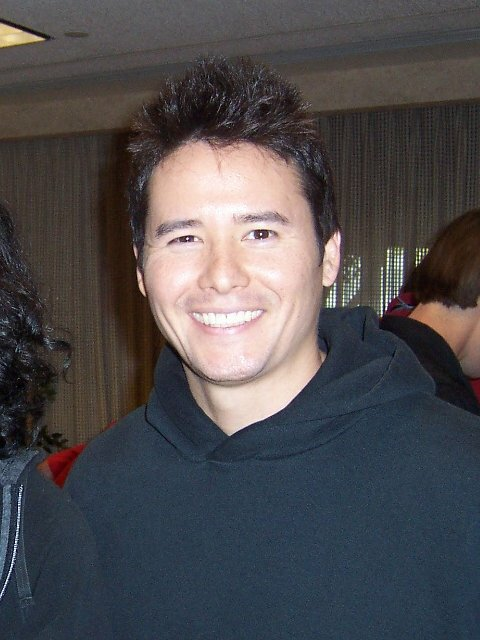
Yoshitsugu Matsuoka (left) and Johnny Yong Bosch (right) voiced the protagonist Vash

Toho producer Katsuhiro Takei stated that the project aimed to create "a new Trigun", acknowledging the original manga and prior anime adaptations as "excellent pieces of work" that were already complete. The intent with Trigun Stampede was to attract new viewers by avoiding the impression that prior knowledge was necessary. Original manga author Yasuhiro Nightow supported the project, characterizing any continuation beyond the first anime as "bonus time" where the staff had creative freedom. Nightow was involved from the beginning in an advisory role to ensure the project remained faithful to the core of Trigun, though he found few issues with the developed script, concluding the team had successfully grasped the concept of a new Trigun.

Takei advocated for the use of 3DCG animation, believing the core of Trigun was strong enough to adapt to different formats. Animation studio Orange began by developing concept art and a world that balanced nostalgic elements with new designs. Kouji Tajima, who was responsible for this art, read the original manga to develop his interpretation. Development lasted approximately five years, commencing in 2017 prior to the broadcast of Orange's Land of the Lustrous. The CG modeling process alone took a year and a half, completing before the first trailer's release in July 2022.

The narrative focused on the origins and backstory of the protagonist Vash, particularly his past with Rem and Knives, to explore his character in greater depth. Takei stated that, unlike the original manga and previous anime adaptations where the story always centered on Vash, for Trigun Stampede the team "really want to focus on the depth of Vash"; therefore, they opted to concentrate on his origin, memories, and the time he spent with Rem and Knives. For Trigun Stargaze, director Masako Sato sought to portray Vash as a character incapable of true righteousness, continually emphasizing the differences between him and his brother while also exploring his sensitive side as the series progressed. Sato was moved to tears while recording one of Matsuoka's lines, feeling that the actor was a perfect fit for the role. For the English dub, Johnny Yong Bosch reprised his role as Vash and expressed gratitude for the opportunity to portray the character again.

Tatsuya Kato composed the soundtrack. Takei decided against using Tsuneo Imahori's original 1998 soundtrack, feeling it would not suit the new world being built for this adaptation.

== Release ==
Animated by Orange, the series was announced in June 2022. It was directed by Kenji Mutō, with Takehiko Oxi credited with the story draft, and Tatsurō Inamoto, Shin Okashima, and Yoshihisa Ueda writing the screenplay. Kōji Tajima served as concept designer and credited with the character concept, and Nao Ootsu served as chief designer. Kōdai Watanabe, Tetsurō Moronuki, Takahiko Abiru, Akiko Satō, Soji Ninomiya, and Yumihiko Amano designed the characters, and Tatsuya Kato composed the music. It aired from January 7 to March 25, 2023, on TV Tokyo and its affiliates. The opening song is "Tombi", performed by Kvi Baba, while the ending song is "Hoshi no Kuzu α" (星のクズ α), performed by singer Salyu and composed by Haruka Nakamura.

Following the series' final episode, it was announced that a "final phase" was in production. In July 2024, it was announced that it would be titled Trigun Stargaze, with the story set 2.5 years after the end of Trigun Stampede. It is directed by Masako Sato, with Oxi returning for the original story, with Kazuyuki Fudeyasu in charge of writing and supervising the series' scripts, while Tajima returned as the original character designer and concept artist. Kiyotaka Oshiyama serves as character designer for the series, previously working on special effect design on Trigun Stampede. It aired from January 10 to March 28, 2026. The opening theme song is "Picaresque Hero", performed by Ano, while the ending theme song is "Stardust", performed by Fomare.

Crunchyroll has streamed both series worldwide, excluding Asia, but including the Philippines, Singapore, India, Pakistan, Bhutan, Sri Lanka, Bangladesh, Nepal, Kazakhstan, and Kyrgyzstan. The English dub for Stampede premiered on January 21, 2023, featuring Johnny Yong Bosch reprising his role as Vash; the English dub for Stargaze premiered on January 24, 2026. Medialink licensed the series in Southeast Asia for streaming on Ani-One Asia's YouTube channel.

=== Episodes ===
==== Trigun Stampede ====
No. overall	No. in season	Title	Directed by (Note: Production staff information is taken from the ending credits of each episode.)	Storyboarded by	Original release date
1	1	"Noman's Land" (Note: Stylized in all caps in both Japanese and English.)	Naomichi Yamato	Kenji Mutō	January 7, 2023
A spacefaring colonization fleet suffers a catastrophe, forcing a woman named Rem Saverem to sacrifice herself to send two young twin brothers, Vash and Knives, to the nearby planet Noman's Land. Many years later, the survivors of the colony fleet manage to survive the harsh environment of Noman's Land thanks to plants, which provide much needed water and electricity. In the meantime, Vash has become an infamous outlaw nicknamed "Vash the Stampede" with a massive bounty on his head, and is found by a pair of reporters named Meryl Stryfe and Roberto De Niro who protect him from military police seeking to apprehend him to earn the bounty. They then arrive at the town of Jeneora Rock, where Vash is welcomed as a hero, but he is troubled that the town's plant is failing. The military police catch up and arrest Vash, but he knocks out the leader in a duel and destroys a cluster bomb he launched with a single bullet. When Roberto asks Vash what he is afraid of, he responds that he is wondering about the whereabouts of Nai, now going by the name "Millions Knives", as he is responsible for Rem's death and stranding humanity on Noman's Land.
2	2	"The Running Man"; Transliteration: "Nigeru Otoko" (Japanese: 逃げる男)	Minoru Yamaoka	Minoru Yamaoka	January 14, 2023
Vash explains to Meryl and Roberto that he has been mistakenly accused of stealing plants when it is really Knives who is responsible. Their interview is then interrupted when the entire town of Jeneora Rock attacks Vash, seeking to claim the bounty on his head so they can repair their broken down plant. However, a pair of outlaws called the Hard Punch Nebraskas, consisting of an elderly father and his son Gofsef, enter the fray to claim the bounty as well. Realizing the townspeople are in danger, Vash leads the Nebraskas away into the desert and evades them. Frustrated they lost their bounty, the Nebraskas decide to attack Jeneora Rock instead and steal their remaining plant. Vash returns and confronts the Nebraskas, but during the fight, Gofsef is thrown from a cliff. Vash convinces the townspeople to save Gofsef, which results in them and the Nebraskas befriending each other. As everybody celebrates, Vash attempts to quietly leave, with Roberto guessing that he wants to avoid Knives tracking him down. However, strange insect-like machines suddenly attach themselves to Gofsef and explode.
3	3	"Bright Light, Shine through the Darkness"; Transliteration: "Hikari yo, Yami o Terase" (Japanese: 光よ、闇を照らせ)	Mie Ōishi	Kenji Mutō	January 21, 2023
More machines appear and attach themselves to Vash and the townspeople. Roberto explains this is the tactic of the infamous E.G. Hamilton, who enjoys killing people with bombs. Vash flushes Hamilton from concealment, but he then attempts to steal the town's plant. Vash, Meryl, and Roberto manage to grapple Hamilton and force him to disable the bombs attached to everyone or be blown up with them. Hamilton disables the bombs, but Vash stops the townspeople from taking his life. Knives then arrives at the town, killing Hamilton and several townspeople and cutting off the elder Nebraska's arm. He steals the town's plant, but before he leaves, he unleashes a massive attack that completely destroys the town. In the aftermath, with many of the townspeople badly injured or killed, the survivors angrily tell Vash to leave when they realize Knives is his brother. Vash takes his leave and heads east towards July City to pursue Knives.
4	4	"Hungry!"	Naomichi Yamato	Hiroyasu Aoki	January 28, 2023
While driving Vash and Roberto to July City, Meryl accidentally hits a traveling priest carrying a large wrapped cross. They take him to a nearby refueling station where they find the inhabitants murdered except for a young boy. Suddenly, the whole group is swallowed from below by a Grand Worm. Inside the cavernous body, the boy runs off, and Meryl and Roberto disappear as well. Vash and the priest are then ejected from the worm through its spout, but Vash allows them to be swallowed again to save the others. Vash realizes that the boy is controlling the worm and the priest unwraps the cross to reveal a highly advanced weapon which he uses to fire at the boy and slice the worm in half from the inside. After the group is reunited and dine on worm meat, he reveals that his name is Nicholas D. Wolfwood and offers to travel with them. Later, Wolfwood secretly meets up with the boy, who is really Zazie the Beast, revealing they are both in the employ of Knives.
5	5	"Child of Blessing"; Transliteration: "Shukufuku no Kodomo" (Japanese: 祝福の子供)	Hiroshi Nishikiori	Hiroshi Nishikiori	February 4, 2023
Vash and his friends come across an abandoned settlement which relied on wind power instead of plants for survival. However, the wind has long stopped. They are suddenly attacked by massive cyborg, which is intent on killing Vash. As Vash evades the cyborg, it is slowly revealed that the god-fearing village was struggling due to the lack of wind and a boy named Rollo was picked to be the next "sacrifice" to obtain God's blessing. Rollo ran into the desert and was found by Vash, who promised to protect him. However, Rollo was still sacrificed and taken by Knives' organization. Their experiments turned him into a powerful cyborg. He was then set loose and returned to slaughter the entire village, including his mother. Knives is now exploiting Rollo's resentment towards Vash for failing to protect him. Vash tries to calm Rollo down who hesitates. However, Wolfwood shoots him through the head, killing him. Vash is furious at Wolfwood, but he reminds Vash of his failure to protect the boy who had his humanity taken from him.
6	6	"Once Upon a Time in Hopeland"; Transliteration: "Wansu Apon a Taimu in Hōpurando" (Japanese: ワンス・アポン・ア・タイム・イン・ホープランド)	Minoru Yamaoka	Minoru Yamaoka	February 11, 2023
Meryl and Roberto drop Vash and Wolfwood off at a port to board a sand steamer bound for July. However, during transit, Vash is attacked by an assassin that Wolfwood recognizes as Livio. Years ago, Wolfwood met Livio in the Hopeland orphanage where Wolfwood befriended the younger boy. Wolfwood was later taken away by Knives' organization, the Eye of Michael, where he was injected with an experimental drug over the course of months. The drug strengthened his body, but also prematurely aged him into an adult and he was subsequently coerced into joining the Eye of Michael to protect Livio. Back in the present, Vash and Wolfwood attempt to non-lethally neutralize Livio. Zazie and Legato Bluesummers observe the battle, and Legato decides to complicate matters by sabotaging the sand steamer, sending it on a collision course towards Hopeland. At the same time, the Bad Lads Gang launch a raid by boarding the sand steamer. Now caught between Livio, the steamer's security forces, and the Bad Lads Gang, Vash and Wolfwood are forced to decide between who to save and who to kill.
7	7	"Wolfwood"	Mie Ōishi	Michio Fukuda	February 18, 2023
Wolfwood decides that stopping Livio is his responsibility and they begin firing their weapons at each other at close range. Although they are hit multiple times, their modified bodies quickly repair themselves. Vash heads inside the sand steamer where he neutralizes some of the Bad Lads Gang and meets Meryl and Roberto. Vash takes them to the deck where he then assists Wolfwood in fighting Livio. Wolfwood manages to reach out to Livio, who finally remembers his close relationship with Wolfwood and the horrible deeds he performed for the Eye of Michael. He then shoots himself in the head. Unhappy with this turn of events, Legato activates the steamer's ion cannon and aims it at Hopeland, but Vash, Wolfwood, and Meryl work together to redirect it. The massive sand steamer continues towards Hopeland, so while Wolfwood heads to the engine room to shut down the steamer's engines, Vash heads for the plant chamber. Outside, Legato and Zazie recover Livio's body and withdraw. Wolfwood, Meryl, and Roberto track Vash to the plant chamber where they see him communicating with a living being within the plant and also revealing that he has plant-like abilities.
8	8	"Our Home."	Naomichi Yamato	Tomohiko Ito	February 25, 2023
Vash experiences a flashback to the human colonization fleet where it is revealed that both Vash and Knives are Independents, human-like beings born from regular plants. He regretted trusting Knives with the command codes for the ships which he used to sabotage and destroy most of the fleet. Suffering from guilt, Vash wandered the desert where he was rescued by the survivors of Ship Three, led by Luida Leitner. Despite the survivors' mistrust, especially from second-in-command Brad, Luida insisted on keeping Vash alive, albeit in captivity. Months later, after Ship Three's plant began malfunctioning, Vash could sense its distress and insisted on seeing it. He used his powers to heal the plant which led to him to being freed and becoming accepted as an official member of Ship Three. Five years passed as Vash began traveling with Brad to other crashed ships to heal their plants. Now settled in, Ship Three gave him his signature red jacket. However, Brad eventually managed to repair Ship Five's black box, which revealed Vash and Knives' role in the crash. Overhearing this, Vash left to atone for his mistake. He eventually arrived at another crashed ship where he encountered Knives.
9	9	"Millions Knives"	Hiroshi Nishikiori	Hiroshi Nishikiori	March 4, 2023
Vash and Knives witnessed the survivors of the crashed ship use up their plants to power their new city causing Knives to swear revenge against all humanity. He struck out, killing the human guards and when Luida arrived to retrieve Vash, Knives ordered him to kill her. Vash refused and when Knives tried to kill her, it caused Vash to unintentionally open a "gate" in his left arm. Knives removed Vash's arm to close the gate and then withdrew, promising that within a century, he would destroy "millions" of humans and populate the planet with plants. In the present, 150 years later, Vash wakes up in Ship Three, which intervened to stop the sand steamer. The much older Luida shows Meryl and Roberto a huge terrarium containing flora with which they plan to terraform Noman's Land. However, Meryl and Roberto are kidnapped by Zazie and taken to Knives' base in July. Zazie reveals that they are in fact a hive mind representing the collective will of the indigenous Worms of Nomans Land, who are trying to determine whether they would benefit most by aligning themselves with humans or plants.
10	10	"Humanity"; Transliteration: "Ningen" (Japanese: 人間)	Minoru Yamaoka	Yoshiaki Kawajiri	March 11, 2023
Vash and Wolfwood arrive in July, where Vash reveals he knows Wolfwood has been working for Knives. At Knives' base, Meryl and Roberto meet the researcher Bill Conrad who explains that he has been attempting to create a new type of weaponized human which would be better adapted to the hostile conditions of Noman's Land. However, his experiments such as Monev the Gale, Nicholas and Livio have ended in failure. He is now using cloned tissue from Knives in an attempt to create a new type of human-plant hybrid type of humanity which are "Independents" like Knives and Vash. When Meryl expresses pity for them, one named Elendira bursts from her capsule and attacks her and Roberto. Vash and Wolfwood arrive just in time to save Meryl from Elendira, but Roberto is mortally wounded. He entrusts his signature derringer pistol to Meryl before dying and she decides to confront Knives herself. Wolfwood parts ways with Vash now that his mission is complete. Vash confronts Knives, who drops him into a pitfall trap, intending to remake him as the perfect Independent.
11	11	"To a New World"; Transliteration: "Shin Sekai e" (Japanese: 新世界へ)	Minoru Yamaoka	Tomohiko Ito	March 18, 2023
Vash is dropped into a tank, where Knives forcefully initiates mental connection with him. Meanwhile, Meryl heads to find Vash and is outraged when Wolfwood states that Vash is no longer his concern. She reaches Conrad's lab where he explains that plants are a conduit between their physical powers and its source in a core which exists in a higher dimension. Knives intends to synchronize with Vash, using his unique ability to open a two-way gate to the higher dimension. Knives plans to use the core to give every plant a soul, making them all Independents and guaranteeing humanity's extinction. Vash resists as Knives manipulates his memories and shows him that there was a third Independent child on their ship who was used for cruel experiments. Knives finally breaks Vash's will by saying he brought down the colonial fleet for Vash's benefit. When the brothers are fully synchronized, Knives opens the gate and travels to the core. Outside, Vash begins spawning tendrils that begin destroying July as they form a massive flowering humanoid figure while Knives proclaims the Independents will bring a new order to the world.
12 (Note: Episode 12 is officially numbered as episode #0.)	12	"High Noon at July" (Note: Stylized in all caps in Japanese.)	Kenji Mutō	Kenji Mutō	March 25, 2023
Knives makes contact with the Core to birth a new generation of Independents. Meryl pleads with Vash to wake up, and her voice ultimately causes him to regains his senses, ejecting Knives from the higher dimension. Knives then battles Vash for control of the Core as Wolfwood takes Meryl to safety. Eventually, Vash loads the Core into his gun and fires it into space to safely dispose of its energy, but Knives dives into the beam to try and recover it, but fails and is presumably killed. Vash then impacts in July City, inadvertently destroying the entire city. Two years later, Vash has become a fugitive again, with the remaining cities posting an unprecedented $$60 billion bounty on his head. Meryl pays a visit to the city's ruins to pay her respects to Roberto and is warned by Zazie that other humans from Earth will be coming. Additionally, Meryl is informed by her superiors that she is being assigned a new partner named Milly Thompson. Meanwhile, an amnesiac Vash is living quietly in a small settlement. In outer space, another human colony fleet led by the Independent Chronica detects a Gate disturbance and traces its location to Noman's Land.

==== Trigun Stargaze ====
No. overall	No. in season	Title	Directed by	Written by	Storyboarded by	Original release date
13	1	"Wandering Days"	Masako Sato	Kazuyuki Fudeyasu	Masako Sato	January 10, 2026
Two years after the destruction of July City, Meryl and Milly investigate a new string of plant robberies being carried out by Knives' group. While traveling back from an investigation, they are informed by Zazie about the discovery of a crashed starship from the Big Fall. Inside the ship, Zazie shows them the corpse of a plant that had for some reason died shortly after the entire crew was killed in the Big Fall, and wonders if humans can truly come to understand plants. Meryl insists that she will find way for humans and plants to coexist. Suddenly, Noman's Land is then contacted by another colony fleet from Earth, informing them that they will arrive at the planet in six months and are willing to evacuate the population, causing mass celebrations. Meanwhile, a catatonic Vash is being cared for by a desert hermit, when a ship crashes nearby carrying a young girl who is looking for Vash.
14	2	"Unforgiven"	Yuya Horiuchi	Kazuyuki Fudeyasu	Taizo Yoshida	January 17, 2026
Ship Three also receives the colony fleet's transmission, and are glad that their distress signal was heard. However, the ship suddenly comes under attack from unknown enemies, and Brad ejects the young girl Jessica in an escape pod to find Vash. The pod follows the tracker in Vash's prosthetic arm and crash lands. Jessica wakes up to find herself in the care of the hermit, Hoppered. He shows her Vash, and she is shocked at his catatonic state. Hoppered explains that he found Vash shortly after the Lost July incident and had been taking care of him ever since. Jessica attempts to jog Vash's memory, but fails. Seeing how distraught Jessica is, Hoppered gives Vash a gun and threatens that he will kill Jessica tonight if Vash does not intervene. That night, Vash arrives to confront Hoppered, and during their battle it is revealed Hoppered was taking care of a blind prostitute named Eriks who he fell in love with but was killed in the Lost July incident. Vash is able to incapacitate Hoppered, but he grabs Vash's gun and forces him to fatally shoot him. As he dies, Hoppered has a vision of reuniting with Eriks in the afterlife. Upon learning from Jessica Ship Three is under attack, Vash leaves with Jessica, uncomfortably aware that the only other person who is aware of the ship's existence is Knives. Elsewhere, Meryl and Milly decide to investigate the first reported sighting of Vash in two years, and accidentally run over Wolfwood.
15	3	"Memento Mori"	Akie Ishii	Kazuyuki Fudeyasu	Yusuke Kubo; Masako Sato	January 24, 2026
Meryl, Milly, and Wolfwood follow Vash's trail while Vash and Jessica return to Ship Three. Upon boarding, they find the ship seemingly abandoned until they encounter Leonof the Puppetmaster, one of Knives' henchmen. Leonof attacks Vash with the intention of capturing him and taking him back to Knives. Vash fights back and eventually corners Leonof inside the ship's research dome, where he has Jessica manipulate the ship's gravity to disable Leonof's puppets, allowing Vash to destroy his control system. Despite being defeated, Leonof tries to continue the fight but is knocked out by the arrival of Meryl, Milly, and Wolfwood, who have a heartfelt reunion with Vash. Leonof then despairs that nobody except Knives every paid attention to him, but Vash assures him that is not the case by calling him by his real name, Emilio. Afterwards, the crew of Ship Three emerges from their shelter, and Meryl assures Vash that she and the rest of his friends will help carry his guilt over the destruction of July City. Elsewhere, Elendira reports Leonof's failure to Knives, who has been reduced to a brain kept alive in a life support tank.
16	4	"From Order to Chaos"	Ken Sanuma	Kazuyuki Fudeyasu	Atsushi Otsuki	January 31, 2026
As Vash and his friends recover at Ship Three, Knives' followers continue their plant thefts, sacrificing the plants and grafting their body parts to Knives to regenerate his body. As his body heals, Knives dreams about Tesla being experimented on. One of his followers, Midvalley the Hornfreak, shows disgust at Legato and Elendira's violent tendencies, but feels he has no choice but follow them. With Knives' recovery taking longer than expected, Elendira and Legato decide they need to raid Ship Three to steal its plants despite Conrad's protests. Legato orders Midvalley to infiltrate Ship Three and capture Vash, since he will be needed for Knives' revival. At Ship Three, Vash and his friends conclude that Knives will not sit idly by when the second colony fleet arrives, and decide to stop him for good. Midvalley then attacks the ship, and Wolfwood decides to face him so Vash has time to get his prosthetic arm repaired.
17	5	"What a Wonderful World"	Takashi Noto	Kazuyuki Fudeyasu	Takashi Noto	February 7, 2026
In a flashback, Midvalley recalls how Knives cut his group to pieces to coerce him into becoming a hitman because of his ability to weaponize sound. Wolfwood orders Midvalley to leave, but the latter reveals that Knives plans to attack Ship Three anyway. The two then battle, with Wolfwood trying to convince Midvalley to turn against Knives as he did, pointing out how Midvalley is attempting to avoid collateral damage. However, Midvalley's fear of Knives is greater, and he continues the fight. Luida uses information gained from Emilio to cancel out Midvalley's sound waves with a feedback loop, allowing Vash to get close and disable his saxophone. With Midvalley in custody, Vash and his friends all prepare to defend Ship Three. Meanwhile, unfazed by Midvalley's failure, Legato leads the attack on Ship Three.
18	6	"The Darkest Hour Is Just Before the Dawn." (Note: Stylized in sentence case in Japanese.)	Akie Ishii	Kazuyuki Fudeyasu	Takayoshi Nagatomo	February 14, 2026
Knives' forces attack Ship Three, with Vash and Wolfwood doing their best to defend it. However, Vash cannot bring himself to kill Legato, who easily subdues him with his telekinesis. However, Knives' Ark takes damage in the battle, forcing Legato to withdraw with Vash and just two stolen plants, although Wolfwood manages to board the Ark before it leaves. It is revealed that Wolfwood was secretly assisting Legato to capture Vash and secure his freedom from the organization, and they use Vash to revive Knives. Meanwhile, Wolfwood asks Conrad why Vash and Knives' hair appears to be turning black, and he reveals that Independents only have a limited amount of power, and the more they use it, the more their hair turns black until they run out of energy and die. Now revived, Knives declares that he will start a "flood" by destroying the incoming colonial fleet and creating a second Big Fall, however Vash swears that he will put a stop to Knives' plans. Knives then uses his powers to destroy all the satellites orbiting Nomans Land, completely cutting off all communications.
19	7	"The Hurt Locker"	Ken Sanuma	Kazuyuki Fudeyasu	Rei Nakahara	February 21, 2026
Over the next five months, Meryl and Milly attempt to follow Knives' trail as he continues his plant thefts, but the loss of long range satellite communications hampers their efforts. Meanwhile, Knives and Legato continue to torture Vash to coerce him into joining their side, but Vash remains defiant and accuses Knives of being responsible for the suffering of plants due to stranding humanity on a barren world, forcing them rely on plants for survival. Meryl and Milly eventually return to Ship Three, where Emilio and Midvalley have reformed and integrated with the crew. Luida reveals that they had been spending the past five months restoring Ship Three's flight capability so they can chase down the Ark. Trading information, they learn that Knives is stealing plants from settlements to corral all of the humans to the city of Octovern where he can eliminate them all in one fell swoop. Meryl then wonders if killing Knives is the only way to save everyone. On the Ark, the plants refuse to help Knives, so he begins forcefully grafting them to his body, which leads Elendira to doubt his motives. Legato begins to weaken after five months of restraining Vash nonstop, which allows Wolfwood to gun him down and free Vash. As they try to escape, they are blocked by Razlo the Tri-Punisher of Death.
20	8	"Good Bye, My Friend"	Kotaro Tamura	Kazuyuki Fudeyasu	Keiichiro Kawaguchi; Yusuke Kubo	February 28, 2026
In a flashback, it is revealed that Razlo is actually a split personality of Livio, who the latter created as a way to cope with the experimentation he suffered. With Vash unconscious, Wolfwood barely escapes the Ark and heads for his hometown of Hopeland. Upon arriving, he finds out that most of the town is already evacuating to Octovern, but they are intercepted by Knives' henchmen. Razlo continues his pursuit of Wolfwood and Vash, so Wolfwood puts Vash in the care of the orphanage while he attempts to hold off Razlo. During the battle, Wolfwood continuously suffers grievous wounds, and his use of his regeneration drug further accelerates his aging. Wolfwood eventually falls, and finally realizes that he considers Vash his friend. Vash finally regains consciousness and intervenes, preventing Razlo from finishing off Wolfwood. Livio's personality then resurfaces and banishes Razlo, and he performs a blood transfusion that manages to save Wolfwood's life.
21	9	"Reunion"	Tetsuro Tanaka	Kazuyuki Fudeyasu	Sumie Noro	March 7, 2026
With no way to reach Octovern and the orphanage only having a week's worth of supplies left, Vash decides to link up with Ship Three to have them pick up the orphans before heading off to confront Knives. However, Livio ends up going since Vash is unable to drive Wolfwood's motorcycle. After five days, Livio is able to make contact with Ship Three. Luida however refuses to take the orphans aboard the ship, explaining that they intend to take it into battle against Knives. Instead, she suggests that Ship Three's children and noncombatants will take shelter at Hopeland with enough supplies to keep them fed. Vash is reunited with his friends and Milly finds out from a worm that her family is safe at Octovern. That night, Vash uses his powers to create special bullets when Wolfwood and Livio ask him how he plans to stop Knives. Vash reasons that he can use his power to separate Knives from the plants he has absorbed, which will render him unable to carry out his plans. Meryl then suggest Vash use his resonance with plants to lure Knives to a battlefield of his choosing. The next day, Vash and his friends prepare to head off to set their trap. Emilio and Midvalley gift Wolfwood their remaining healing serums, and everybody cheers on Vash and his friends as they depart.
22	10	"Martyr"	Shinya Watada	Kazuyuki Fudeyasu	Shinya Watada	March 14, 2026
Knives continues grafting plants to himself in order to gain his full power, and Elendira wonders why she always feel great sorrow from him. She then senses Vash's resonance and directs the Ark to head for his location. Meanwhile, Vash decides to make their meeting point the original crash site of the Big Fall. He and his friends muse that nobody, not even Knives, knows what plants are truly feeling, nor their intentions, and Vash realizes he does not know what Knives is thinking, either. The Ark then arrives, with Legato and Ninelives beginning their attack. While Wolfwood and Livio deal with Ninelives, Legato focuses his attacks on Vash, blaming him for Knives' despair for abandoning him. As the battle rages, Meryl and Milly notice the Ark floating near a sand dune and they get the idea to board the ship. Wolfwood attempts to assist Vash, but Legato regains his telekinesis and holds them down. He then tries to goad Vash into killing him by slowly choking Wolfwood to death. Realizing there's no other way to save Wolfwood, Vash fires his gun at Legato, but the bullet is stopped by a fully powered Knives as he descends from the Ark.
23	11	"I Miss You."	Tetsuo Hirakawa	Kazuyuki Fudeyasu	Hiroyasu Aoki; Tetsuo Hirakawa	March 21, 2026
Knives decapitates Legato for overstepping his place, while Wolfwood and Livio attack him. However, they cannot stop Knives from absorbing Vash into his body and they are swallowed by Worm. Zazie tells them that they are concerned Knives' plan will bring extinction to the Worms as well, so they have decided to take them to Octovern. Meanwhile, Meryl and Milly manage to board the Ark, hoping that Vash's backup plan to neutralize Knives from the inside will work. Elendira is concerned when she realizes Knives left Ninelives behind, and that she cannot understand what Knives is feeling. The next day, the Ark arrives at Nomans Land just as the Ark arrives over Octovern. Knives then connects to all of the plants in the area and forcibly attempts to convert them into Independents. Elendira attacks Meryl and Milly when she discovers them, but breaks down in despair when she sees that Knives has no intention of synchronizing with her. Meryl cannot bring herself to kill Elendira and instead comforts her, and Elendira realizes Knives must feel loneliness. The plants that Knives connected to then begin withering and dying, with Conrad explaining not even Knives knows how the plants feel. In despair that his plan to create a paradise for plants has failed, Knives commences the Genesis Flood Big Fall. Inside Knives, Vash continues to resist until he views Tesla's memories, which show that Rem was complicit in the experimentation on her, a fact Knives knew and kept secret from Vash. Realizing he failed to understand Knives' intentions, Vash falls into despair while Knives heads into space to attack the colony fleet.
24	12	"Quo Vadis"	Masako Sato	Kazuyuki Fudeyasu	Yusuke Kubo; Masako Sato	March 28, 2026
Realizing they are dealing with an Independent, the colony fleet attempts to shoot Knives down while Ship Three, Wolfwood, and Livio protect Octovern. However, Knives outmaneuvers the fleet and assimilates their plants, using them to drag the entire fleet into Noman's Land's atmosphere. On the Ark, Meryl has the idea of playing the Song of the Plants in an attempt to communicate with the plants and convince them to stop Knives. Her plan is a success, and the plants rebel against Knives, allowing the colony ships to break free from his grasp while the plants he grafted to his body, including Tesla, begin to leave him. Vash takes the opportunity to escape Knives as well, and apologize for not knowing about all of the pain Knives had been carrying inside him. Knives asks Vash to kill him, since he will never stop trying to destroy humanity, but Vash instead uses his remaining power to open a Gate so they can both return to their home dimension together. Unwilling to see Vash take on more suffering on his behalf, Knives absorbs the Gate as he and Vash crash into the remains of July City. One year later, the complete evacuation of Noman's Land is nearly complete. Knives' fall to the planet also created a Genesis phenomenon that introduced water and flora to the environment, which will eventually terraform the entire planet, so a small group of volunteers have decided to stay to study the phenomenon and tend to the planet. Vash initially decides to stay on Nomans Land, but his friends convince him to leave with them as well to go on another adventure.

== Reception ==
Reviewing the first three episodes of Trigun Stampede, Bolts of Anime News Network (ANN) noted changes such as the absence of Milly Thompson and earlier incorporation of later plot points presented in the original series, while finding some narrative revisions—like Vash's backstory and Meryl's role as a reporter—improved. He praised Studio Orange's stylized 3D animation and the effective introduction of Millions Knives. However, he criticized the exposition-heavy dialogue, contrived action sequences, and underdeveloped focus on the townspeople's desperation. He concluded that the series had an "OK start". In a general review, James Beckett, also writing for ANN, praised the series as Studio Orange's most technically accomplished work, highlighting its fluid animation and shift in tone from Western to science-fiction. He found the characters and villains memorable and commended the pacing, though he noted that the twelve-episode series left several plot threads unresolved. Eric Himmelheber of Anime Corner praised the sixth episode, focusing on Wolfwood's backstory, calling it the best episode of Winter 2023 and lauding its execution and visuals.
