= Trigun: Badlands Rumble =

2010 anime film

- Theatrical release poster
- Directed by: Satoshi Nishimura
- Screenplay by: Yasuko Kobayashi
- Story by: Yasuhiro Nightow; Satoshi Nishimura
- Based on: Trigun by Yasuhiro Nightow
- Produced by: Shigeru Kitayama; Yukiko Koike; Yoshiyuki Fudetani; Tsuneo Takechi
- Starring: Masaya Onosaka; Shō Hayami; Hiromi Tsuru; Satsuki Yukino; Maaya Sakamoto; Tsutomu Isobe
- Cinematography: Shinichi Igarashi
- Edited by: Satoshi Terauchi
- Music by: Tsuneo Imahori
- Production company: Madhouse
- Distributed by: KlockWorx
- Release date: April 24, 2010
- Running time: 90 minutes
- Country: Japan
- Language: Japanese
- Box office: ¥72 million (Japan)

Trigun: Badlands Rumble is a 2010 Japanese animated science fiction action film directed by Satoshi Nishimura. Produced by Madhouse, the film is based on the Trigun manga written by Yasuhiro Nightow. It follows Vash the Stampede, who arrives in a city where several bounty hunters have gathered to kill wanted robber Gasback and claim a huge reward.

Trigun: Badlands Rumble marks Hiromi Tsuru's final role as Meryl Stryfe prior to her death in 2017.

== Plot ==
Twenty years prior to the events of Trigun, the outlaw Gasback and his gang rob a bank. The other henchmen betray him and escape with the money, and their leader Cain shoots Gasback and leaves him to be caught by the police. Vash the Stampede intervenes to stop Gasback from killing any of the others; Gasback escapes capture and continues his life of crime.

In the present, Cain has become the mayor of Macca City, using his share of the robbery money to upgrade its power plant and construct a huge bronze statue in his likeness. One of the other henchmen, Dorino, has been forced to take shelter with Cain after Gasback destroyed his business. Cain applies to the Bernardelli Insurance Society for a policy on the statue, prompting Meryl Stryfe and Milly Thompson to travel to Macca City in an attempt to keep it safe.

The high value of both the statue and the plant fuels rumors that Gasback might strike and attracts scores of bounty hunters intent on claiming a large reward for his capture. While traveling to Macca City by sand steamer, Vash helps a young woman named Amelia fend off a group of thugs who are harassing her. He flirts with her once they arrive and saves her from being attacked in a saloon, but she repeatedly expresses her disgust toward him.

Gasback is saved from a police ambush by Nicholas D. Wolfwood, who is acting as his bodyguard after Gasback previously saved him from dying of thirst in the desert. Wolfwood has agreed to protect Gasback without taking an active role in any robberies. Later, Gasback travels to another city and destroys a factory owned by Mechio, another of his former associates. As Mechio seeks refuge with Cain, the bounty hunters decide that Gasback will not attack Macca City after all and begin to disperse.

Gasback easily fights his way to Cain's mansion, and Wolfwood distracts Vash long enough for him to enter. Declaring his contract with Gasback fulfilled, Wolfwood then allows Vash to pursue the robber into the mansion. A standoff ensues, during which Cain shoots Dorino and Mechio and Amelia learns of Vash's involvement in Gasback's escape 20 years earlier. Despite Amelia's protest that his actions led to widespread suffering for others, including herself and her mother, Vash allows Gasback to escape again.

Gasback sets off explosives to separate the city's plant from its cradle and lets it roll away, smashing Cain's statue, until his gang can secure it to a getaway vehicle and flee. Amelia gives chase, intending to kill Gasback; Vash and Wolfwood hurry to stop her, but Vash is shot and falls into quicksand, where he sinks from sight. Meryl and Milly are stunned by the news, and Amelia begins to think she is no better than Gasback.

The next day, Amelia and Wolfwood set out to stop Gasback and recover the plant, but are surprised by the reappearance of Vash. He had survived because the bullet hit a piece of tough smoked meat in his coat pocket, and Meryl and Milly rescued him. Vash duels Gasback and wounds him, but Gasback activates an electrical weapon intended to kill Vash. Amelia counters it with a hidden glove, which he recognizes as something he made for his wife, Amelia's mother. Amelia had been born shortly after Gasback left his wife to commit more robberies, but other thieves stole all the money he had left her; when she fell ill, no one would help her due to the stigma of being associated with Gasback. Before dying, Amelia's mother passed the glove on to her.

Having adopted Vash's outlook on life, Amelia allows Gasback to live. Cain then tries to kill him with a missile, but Wolfwood destroys it. Gasback and all of his current and past henchmen are arrested, and the plant is reinstalled in Macca City. Meryl and Milly return to Bernardelli headquarters, and Vash and Wolfwood set off across the desert. Vash changes direction after reading a newspaper article that describes a prison escape by a different group of outlaws, leading Wolfwood to suspect that he has some past connection with them as well.

== Development ==
The October 2005 issue of Neo magazine includes an interview with Masao Maruyama, Madhouse's founder and series planner. In the article he revealed that the studio has been working on a Trigun movie that would be released in "a couple of years". The November 2005 issue of Anime Insider also confirmed this news.

In May 2007, Nightow confirmed at the Anime Central Convention that the Trigun movie was in the early stages of pre-production with a near-final script, although he did not divulge any plot information.

In February 2008, more details about the Trigun movie emerged on the cover of volume 14 of the Trigun Maximum manga, announcing that the movie was scheduled for 2009. In October 2009, however, the movie's official website announced a new Japanese premiere set for spring 2010. The story of the movie would again feature Vash and Wolfwood, the two main characters of the manga.

== Release ==
Trigun: Badlands Rumble opening debut was at #14 on 10 screens.

The film was shown to an American audience first at the Sakura-Con 2010 in Seattle, Washington on Friday, April 2, 2010. Following the showing, the director held a 15-minute Q&A session before the movie, explaining the reasons it was subbed, not dubbed, and why it was premiered at the convention, also explaining the new characters. The movie was shown again on Saturday and Sunday according to the schedule. Funimation announced at Anime Expo along with film producer Shigeru Kitayama that they had licensed the film and plan on releasing it theatrically in the United States. The film made its U.S. television premiere on the broadcast night of Saturday, December 28, 2013, on Adult Swim's Toonami programming block.

== Cast ==
Character	Japanese voice actor	English dubbing actor
Vash the Stampede	Masaya Onosaka	Johnny Yong Bosch
Nicholas D. Wolfwood	Show Hayami	Brad Hawkins
Meryl Stryfe	Hiromi Tsuru	Luci Christian
Milly Thompson	Satsuki Yukino	Trina Nishimura
Amelia Ann McFly	Maaya Sakamoto	Colleen Clinkenbeard; Cherami Leigh (young)
Gasback Gallon Getaway	Tsutomu Isobe	John Swasey
Caine Flaccano (Kepler)	Bin Shimada	Kent Williams
Mechio Tante Ogorare	Fumihiko Tachiki	Newton Pittman
Dorino Ohre Tadiski	Nobuo Tobita	Sonny Strait
Shane B. Goodman	Taiten Kusunoki	Robert McCollum
Amelia's Mother	Kikuko Inoue	Lydia Mackay
