= List of Trigun characters =

Left to right: Vash, Meryl, Wolfwood and Milly

The Trigun anime and manga series features a cast of characters created by Yasuhiro Nightow. It takes place in a western/steampunk setting, primarily on a fictional desert planet where humanity has settled after leaving Earth, where civilization is sparse and mostly lawless. The plot and characters of the series differ greatly between the original manga and its anime adaptation, with the anime following roughly up to the second volume of the manga before diverging into a unique telling of the story. The series' story follows the adventures of Vash the Stampede, a legendary gunman who aims to spread his message of love and peace while combating his brother Millions Knives and Legato Bluesummers.

The protagonist of the series is Vash, a jovial, pacifist gunman who is followed by disaster and misfortune due to the large bounty on his head. Early on in the series, he is pursued by Meryl Stryfe and Milly Thompson, insurance agents assigned with evaluating damages involving him. He also meets Nicholas D. Wolfwood, a violent and serious traveling preacher who becomes his strongest ally and friend. Throughout the series, Vash interacts with and befriends many people across the globe. Opposing him and his companions is his twin brother Millions Knives, who hates humans and his way of life. Closely following Knives is Legato Bluesummers, a cold and powerful man who is the leader of the Gung-Ho Guns, a group of super-powered assassins.

== Main characters ==
=== Vash the Stampede ===
Adult Vash Voiced by: Masaya Onosaka, Yoshitsugu Matsuoka (Trigun Stampede) (Japanese); Johnny Yong Bosch (English)
Young Vash Voiced by: Kōki Miyata, Tomoyo Kurosawa (Trigun Stampede) (Japanese); Bryce Papenbrook, Kristen McGuire (Trigun Stampede) (English)

Vash the Stampede, aka Vash Saverem (ヴァッシュ・ザ・スタンピード, Vasshu za Sutanpīdo) is a sentient Plant who wields a silver revolver and travels from town to town, and is known as "The Humanoid Typhoon" due to the destruction that surrounds him. He and his brother, Knives, were born on a colony ship that was part of a fleet sent to find and settle a new world to extend the human race. There, Rem raised them, instilling in Vash the philosophy that every being deserves life, which he takes to the extreme by attempting to save everyone. However, Knives, who was disgusted by the actions of humans, caused the fleet to crash, killing Rem and many others. Since then, Vash has made it his mission to hunt down Knives and stop him from harming others. During one of his confrontations with Knives, he was forced to destroy the city of July, an incident which haunts him greatly and started his reputation. Initially, Meryl and Milly, representatives from an insurance agency investigating claims made due to damages the "Humanoid Typhoon" caused, find him as bandits are hunting him down to collect the bounty on "The $$60,000,000,000 (sixty billion double dollar) Man".

=== Meryl Stryfe ===
Voiced by: Hiromi Tsuru, Sakura Andou (Trigun Stampede) (Japanese); Dorothy Elias-Fahn (Anime), Luci Christian (Trigun: Badlands Rumble), Sarah Roach (Trigun Stampede) (English)

Meryl Stryfe (メリル・ストライフ, Meriru Sutoraifu) , also known as "Derringer Meryl", is a hot-headed and strong-willed agent of the Bernardelli Insurance Society, who, along with her coworker and best friend, Milly, is sent to evaluate claims regarding Vash. At first, she finds Vash to be a nuisance and dismisses the idea that he is the legendary "Humanoid Typhoon." However, over time, she realizes that Vash is not the villain that he is made out to be nor the buffoon that he presents himself to be, and comes to respect him. She hides dozens of derringer-style "throwaway" pistols under her traveling cape and is skilled at wielding them, but rarely has the opportunity to use them. In the manga, she becomes frightened upon discovering Vash's true nature as a Plant, but later comes to understand his past after seeing his childhood memories and of the destruction of July through his eyes. After Bernardelli shuts down while Knives is ravaging the planet, she and Milly, along with Brad and Luida, assume support roles to help combat him. At the end of the manga, they become investigative reporters for the planet's first television broadcasting channel, continuing to follow Vash wherever he goes.

=== Milly Thompson ===
Voiced by: Satsuki Yukino (Anime and Trigun: Badlands Rumble), Chika Ayamori (Trigun Stargaze) (Japanese); Lia Sargent (Anime), Trina Nishimura (Trigun: Badlands Rumble), Alexis Tipton (Trigun Stargaze) (English)

Milly Thompson (ミリィ・トンプソン, Mirii Tonpuson), also known as "Stungun Milly", is a kind-hearted and optimistic agent of Bernardelli who works alongside her best friend Meryl, who she looks up to and refers to in a respectful manner. She comes from a very large family, and often writes letters to them, which is known as "The Milly Monthly". She wields a concussion gun, referred to as a "stun-gun", which she hides under her coat and is powerful enough to knock over trucks. Although she does not have a relationship with Wolfwood in the manga, events after his death imply that she may have had a romantic interest in him. In the anime, Milly spends the night with him before his death and her reaction to his death is greater than in the manga. In the manga, she has blond hair, while in the anime, she has brown hair.

=== Nicholas D. Wolfwood ===
Voiced by: Shō Hayami, Yoshimasa Hosoya (Trigun Stampede) (Japanese); Jeff Nimoy (Anime), Brad Hawkins (Trigun: Badlands Rumble), David Matranga (Trigun Stampede) (English)

Nicholas D. Wolfwood (ニコラス・D・ウルフウッド, Nikorasu Dī Urufūddo), also known as Nicolas the Punisher, is a member of the Eye of Michael, an organization of assassins. After showing potential in the orphanage in which he was raised, Chapel trained and modified him, giving him enhanced abilities and the ability to regenerate from injuries using special vials, though this causes him to age at a faster rate. He wields a cross-shaped gun called the Punisher, which contains two machine guns and a rocket launcher; the anime depicts one of its unused arms as containing a rack of pistols.

== Antagonists ==
=== Millions Knives ===
Adult Millions Knives Voiced by: Tōru Furusawa, Junya Ikeda (Trigun Stampede), Ryūji Satō (Trigun Stargaze) (Japanese); Kirk Baily, Austin Tindle (Trigun Stampede) (English)
Young Millions Knives Voiced by: Masamichi Ota, Yumiri Hanamori (Trigun Stampede) (Japanese); Joshua Seth, Megan Shipman (Trigun Stampede) (English)

Millions Knives (ミリオンズ・ナイブズ, Mirionzu Naibuzu) is the main antagonist of the Trigun manga and anime and Vash's twin brother, who is one of the few fully sentient Plants. They were born during a mission to further the human race, with Rem raising them until Knives disrupted the course of the ships, causing them to crash. While Vash believes that all beings have potential for good and deserve to live, Knives believes in the survival of the fittest. After discovering experiments performed on other plants, he decides that humans are evil and self-destructive and must be eradicated. Vash disagrees with his plans and seeks to stop him, with Knives seeking to dissuade Vash from basing his life around the "idealistic nonsense" Rem taught him.

His character differs between the manga and the anime; in the manga, he is shown to be apathetic and misanthrophic towards humans but is caring towards other Plants, as he mourns their death and apologizes to one for his impulsiveness when "sacrificing all of those companions". He also cares about Vash to the point of almost absorbing him to stop them from fighting and prevent him from dying. Before his change in attitude, Knives is shown to have been the more enthusiastic of the twins when interacting with humans, before the discovery of Tessla.

In the anime, Knives goes from being introverted as a child to a ruthless sociopath bent on exterminating all humans on the planet. Although he is the primary antagonist, for most of the series he appears only in flashbacks, only appearing in person during the last few episodes. Acting on a tip from Wolfwood, Vash finds Knives at a desert oasis, leading to a battle that initially ends in a stalemate; however, Knives gains the upper hand and tries to annihilate Vash with the power of both brothers' Angel Arms. Vash shoots him repeatedly, disabling him, then bandages his wounds and carries him back to the nearest town.

His role is more prominent in the manga. Many years after landing, he and Vash meet in the city of July in a battle that leaves Vash without his left arm and Knives in a critical state. He slowly regenerates over time, forming the Gung-Ho-Guns to act for him. After he revives and learns using his abilities is causing him to slowly die, he begins absorbing other Plants into himself to strengthen his powers. After fusing with thousands of Plants, Knives launches his "Ark", a floating ship designed to leave humans without resources. As he absorbs more Plants, his Ark takes on the form of a sentient organism, capable of defending itself and, in some cases, teleporting short distances. Vash and Knives fight for a final time, after which Knives saves Vash from the exploding Ark. After bringing Vash to safety, Knives uses the last of his power to create an apple tree before dying.

=== Legato Bluesummers ===
Voiced by: Toshihiko Seki, Koki Uchiyama (Trigun Stampede) (Japanese); Richard Cansino, Daman Mills (Trigun Stampede) (English)

Legato Bluesummers (レガート・ブルーサマーズ, Regāto Burūsamāzu) serves directly under Knives, giving him command of the Gung-Ho Guns, and has devoted himself to him. He has made it his main goal to have Vash experience eternal pain and suffering.

In the manga, Legato takes over while Knives is injured and uses the Gung-Ho Guns to play a "game" with Vash. He gives Vash a case and each Gung-Ho Gun a half coin to place into it, stating that "something interesting will happen" after it is completed. After Knives recovers, Legato's body is crushed and his neck twisted for using the Gung-Ho Guns for his personal agenda. Afterwards, he is restricted to a coffin-like container; he later gains a new coffin with metal appendages that allow limited movement. He eventually learns to use his threads to manipulate and strengthen his own body, and begins wielding a ball and chain and a handgun. He later fights Vash with the coin case completed and subsequently activated, which nullifies his threads, and loses. He then forces Vash to kill him by threatening to kill Livio.

In the anime, Legato, whom Knives recruited to make Vash's life a living hell, becomes the leader of the Gung-Ho Guns and receives Vash's left arm from Knives, giving him the ability to manipulate victims with telepathy. He worships Knives as a god, and sees humans like himself as garbage, only good for consuming resources. Legato forces Vash to kill him by threatening to kill Milly and Meryl, becoming the first person that Vash consciously and willfully kills and fulfilling his promise to "make Vash the Stampede feel eternal pain and suffering".

=== Gung-Ho Guns ===
The Gung-Ho Guns (ガンホーガンズ, Ganhōganzu) are a group of assassins assembled to cause great pain to Vash. They are human, but sacrificed their humanity to gain power, often leaving them mutilated. They each have an assigned number, but not all their numbers are revealed. In the manga, Legato uses them to play a "game" with Vash. He has them each carry half a coin, and gives Vash a case containing the other half of each coin. He explains that if Vash can reassemble all twelve coins, something interesting will happen; when they later fight, it revealed that the filled case can block Legato's powers.

=== Monev the Gale ===
Voiced by: Masuo Amada, Chikahiro Kobayashi (Trigun Stampede) (Japanese); Peter Spellos (anime), Ray Hurd (Trigun Stampede) (English)

Monev the Gale was hired as an assassin to fight Vash; to make him strong enough to do so, Knives locked him in a cell to train his body for twenty years. He wears a powered battle suit and wields two high-powered gatling guns that fire extremely fast due to the pressure chambers on his back and have tremendous stopping power, enough to tear through buildings. He also carries various weapons in a cloth rucksack, including a minigun that powerful enough to punch through a bank vault. Soon after Vash defeats him, he is killed as punishment.

In the anime, his life is spared, but E.G. Mine later kills him and Dominique due to his failure.

=== Dominique the Cyclops ===
Voiced by: Yōko Sōmi (Japanese); Carol Stanzione (English)

Dominique the Cyclops has an ability called the "Demon's Eye", which causes hypnosis and sensory paralysis in her foes, momentarily stunning them and making her movements appear to be immediate. This effect occurs when she lifts her eyepatch, revealing a reptilian eye in the manga and a red eye in the anime. Vash defeats her by placing pressure on his injured finger, allowing him to concentrate on the pain and avoid focusing on her eye. In the anime, she survives her encounter with Vash, but E.G. Mine kills her and Monev and hangs their bodies on a wall for Vash to see. In the manga, she commits suicide to avoid being punished.

=== E.G. Mine ===
Voiced by: Ryō Horikawa, Wataru Takagi (Trigun Stampede) (Japanese); Bob Marx, Mike McFarland (Trigun Stampede) (English)

E.G. Mine is a violent man who wears a sphere-like suit that contains control threads for deploying spikes, which he can use to attack by manipulating the threads. He is defeated in the manga; in the anime, Rai-Dei kills him after Vash defeats him.

=== Rai-Dei the Blade ===
Voiced by: Akio Ōtsuka (Japanese); Kirk Thornton (English)

Rai-Dei (雷泥) is a samurai who seeks the knowledge learned only when facing death. He wields a sword with a built-in gun that can be fired from the hilt; when fired in the middle of his swing, he can swing his sword with enough force to create a sonic blast. In the anime, he is angry that Vash refuses to make his mark true and aim to kill, claiming he wants "a real battle". He escapes after Vash's Angel Arm is forced to activate, though Wolfwood soon kills him. In the manga, he wears "roller skates" that allow him to move at high speeds. After Vash defeats him, he attempts to attack him from behind, but Wolfwood kills him.

=== Leonof the Puppet-Master ===
Voiced by: Kaneta Kimotsuki (Japanese); Milton James (anime), Paul Taylor (Trigun Stampede) (English)

Leonof the Puppet-Master, whose real name is Emilio, is an elderly man who controls puppets through a system of wires and can manipulate them to look like real people. He knew Vash when he was a child; after his love interest died sometime after, he began making puppets to mend his broken spirit. He cared for her body for several years until he battles Vash in the ruins of a floating ship where Vash had lived. During the fight, a portion of the ship falls off and he unsuccessfully tries to hold on to the box containing the remains of his love interest before it falls overboard. Dangling over the edge by one of his puppet wires, Leonof strikes at Vash to force him to let go of the other end and falls to his death.

The anime does not feature his background, and he is simply an assassin who can use his puppets to do various tasks, such as delivering reports to Legato and spying on and attacking people. After Leonof kills Brad using a puppet double of his longtime friend Jessica, Wolfwood kills Leonof in turn. Vash uses some of Leonof's control wires in his fight against Hoppered the Gauntlet, and later during his final showdown with Knives.

=== Gray the Ninelives ===
Voiced by: Kento Fujinuma (Trigun Stampede)

Gray the Ninelives is a large man known for being indestructible. In the manga, he is a mechanical suit that nine dwarves control from the inside, who will only stop fighting when all of them die. After the suit is destroyed and only two survive, they are captured and hand over their coin before later escaping.

In the anime, he is a cyborg whose only remaining human part is his brain, which is encased in armor. Wolfwood kills him by shooting out a pipeline filled with corrosive liquid, melting his armor and exposing his brain and internal frame, before destroying his upper body using the Cross Punisher. However, his legs remain active and deploy a hidden launcher to destroy one of the Plants powering the ship, causing it to crash.

=== Hoppered the Gauntlet ===
Voiced by: Keiichi Nanba (Japanese); Jonathan Fahn (anime), Reagan Murdock (Trigun Stampede) (English)

Hoppered the Gauntlet is a masked man who wears a set of armor to cover his degenerated and vestigial legs while using his arms to move. The armor acts like a top, with him using a shield to propel himself at high speeds. He seeks to kill Vash to avenge a mute and blind woman who was killed during the destruction of July. He eventually loses his mask, exposing a large cross carved into his face. During his final battle, he sees Vash's memory of July, realizes he made the wrong choice, and is killed after turning against the Guns.

The anime does not feature his backstory or expose his face, with him just wishing to make Vash suffer. After Vash deflects his attack with a gunshot, he hurls himself into one of the Plants powering the ship, leading to its crash.

=== Zazie the Beast ===
Voiced by: Hiroshi Kamiya, Tarako (Trigun Stampede), Minami Takayama (Trigun Stargaze) (Japanese); David Umansky, Madeleine Morris (Trigun Stampede) (English)

Zazie the Beast is a collective of group-minded insects that can take over the bodies of humans. They were the original inhabitants of the planet No Man's Land, who formed an alliance with Knives to determine whether humans or Plants were better candidates for co-existence. They originally take over the body of a young boy, but Hoppered destroys it after he catches it spying on him. Zazie later reappears in the body of a teenage girl, though Legato destroys it after they try to infect Knives with a mind-controlling worm. Their last body is a man wearing disco clothing, who they use to deliver their coin to Vash. Soon after, Knives destroys the main hive.

In the anime, Zazie is a demon who possessed the body of Bete, a troubled young boy who can control sand-worms using a high-frequency device he wears on his head. Vash shoots and destroys the device, and Zazie takes full control of Bete to hold Vash, Meryl, and Milly at gunpoint. Wolfwood shoots and kills Zazie, prompting a heated disagreement between him and Vash over their morals. In the manga, the conflict is instead instigated after Wolfwood kills Rai-Dei.

=== Midvalley the Hornfreak ===
Voiced by: Tomohiro Nishimura, Shin-ichiro Miki (Trigun Stargaze) (Japanese); Steve Bulen (English)

Midvalley the Hornfreak is a violent musician who can use his tenor saxophone to generate destructive sound and play frequencies that drive those that hear it into a murderous frenzy. He can also neutralize sounds by playing counter-frequencies. He and his band originally killed for money until Knives found them and killed everyone except Midvalley after they refused his offer to join him. Terrified and resentful of Knives and Legato, Midvalley attempts to betray and desert the Guns, but Legato discovers his plan and takes control of Hoppered's body to kill him. Legato subsequently uses Midvalley's corpse to kill Hoppered, after which they are buried together, with Midvalley's horn being hung on his tombstone.

In the anime, Midvalley plays Sylvia, a cross between an alto and a tenor saxophone, who serves mainly as Legato's bodyguard before becoming the final Gun to fight Vash. In their battle, Midvalley reveals his ability to synchronize sound waves with the body's pain receptors. Vash damages his horn, rendering him unable to play, and Midvalley commits suicide by triggering the machine guns hidden in the bell to backfire into his chest.

=== Caine the Longshot ===
Caine the Longshot is a member of the Gung-Ho Guns who only appears in the anime in place of Elendira the Crimsonnail. He is a mute, talented sniper who wields a rifle with a long barrel, whose scope allows him to fire from many miles away. The poncho he wears can change its coloration to blend in with his surroundings, and he wears a broad-brimmed hat and a steel mask whose left eye is patched shut. Vash distracts him long enough to destroy his rifle, but instead of surrendering, Caine commits suicide by shooting himself in the head with a revolver. He is later buried in the desert, with his hat and a piece of the rifle's barrel marking his grave.

=== Elendira the Crimsonnail ===
Voiced by: Ayumu Murase (Trigun Stampede) (Japanese); Molly Searcy (Trigun Stampede) (English)

Elendira the Crimsonnail, referred to as the lost thirteenth Gung-Ho Gun in the manga, is the most powerful of the group. She is a transgender woman and wears feminine clothing and a pillbox hat. She wields a large briefcase that can shoot giant nails and transform into a crossbow. Underneath her outer garments, she wears restraining armour, which when disabled allows her to move at high speed. She also has the power to project the image of the death of her opponents through touch, crippling them with the realistic illusion. She is jealous of Legato because he is not part of the Guns, suggesting that Legato is more important to Knives than her. She was apparently one of Knives' very first companions, as she was seen walking with him as a child along with Legato. She fights Livio twice, the first time skewering his torso with many nails after launching him through several buildings. Their subsequent rematch results in a similar outcome, despite Livio and Razlo's combined efforts to match her speed. Elendira is ultimately killed when Livio grabs her and uses one of the nails to impale her.

=== Chapel the Evergreen ===
Voiced by: Hirotaka Suzuoki (Japanese); Dan Woren (English)

Simply known as "Chapel" in the manga and also known as 'Master C', he is a member of the "Eye of Michael", an organization of ecclesiastical assassins founded by a church that worships Plants. They provide Knives with mercenaries, with three slots of the Gung-Ho Guns reserved for the Eye of Michael's best. He was Wolfwood's mentor and taught him the skills in being an assassin. He is subsequently shot and left as a paraplegic by Wolfwood, who impersonates him. Despite being middle-aged, like other members of the Eye, the artificial modifications made to his body, which grant him enhanced strength and reflexes and regenerative abilities, have aged him considerably. He uses a wheelchair after Wolfwood shoots him and wields a large cross-shaped machine gun similar to Wolfwood's Punisher, which has four spiked ends at the base of the cross. Wolfwood cracks Chapel's skull and breaks his neck, but Chapel recovers and tries to kill him, not caring that his current protégé Razlo is in the way. Enraged at Chapel's callous behavior, Razlo kills him.

In the anime, he is Wolfwood's direct mentor and wields a parent version of his Cross Punisher, though his version splits into twin machine guns. After Wolfwood killed his abusive guardian as a boy, Chapel took him in and began to train him. The two men fight, with Wolfwood gaining the upper hand and choosing to spare Chapel, but Legato telepathically takes control of Chapel's body and forces him to kill Wolfwood. Chapel subsequently tries and fails to kill Legato in revenge, whereupon Knives obliterates him.

=== Livio and Razlo ===
Voiced by: Genki Muro (Livio) (Trigun Stampede), Daisuke Namikawa (Razlo) (Trigun Stargaze) (Japanese); Patrick McAlister (Livio) (Trigun Stampede) (English)

Livio the Double Fang is a childhood friend of Wolfwood and the final member of the Gung-Ho Guns, who comes from the Eye of Michael. He wields the Double Fangs, two small cross-shaped machine guns strapped on his arms that fire from both ends. His body has been enhanced through increased metabolic rate, allowing him to recover from near fatal wounds instantly. He grew up in the same orphanage as Wolfwood, where he was nicknamed "Livio the Crybaby".

Razlo the Tri-P(unisher) of Death is a violent and psychotic split personality, who is treated as another member of the Gung-Ho Guns. This personality developed following repeated abuse by Livio's father, with Razlo taking all the abuse and allowing Livio to remain unaware of it. Razlo only appears after Livio has suffered intense pain or violence and often commits acts of violence, such as killing Livio's parents. He wields three Punishers, the same gun as Wolfwood, with the aid of a bionic arm, thus giving him the nickname 'the tri-p of death', short for Tri-Punisher of Death. He is aided by three servants who carry his Punishers while Livio's persona is active.

They are defeated after their fight with Wolfwood, though Wolfwood dies soon after, having been injured while overdosing on the regeneration drug. In the aftermath of the fight, Livio comes to terms with Razlo's existence and decides that he is now strong enough to face life on his own. Vash decides to forgive Livio and he becomes Vash's partner in an act of redemption, seeking to live as Wolfwood would have. When Livio fights against Elendira and is unable to win, he allows Razlo to awake and help him kill her by utilizing his faster reflexes and better eyesight. Livio later lives together with the children in his old orphanage and is shown paying his respects at Wolfwood's gravestone.

== Other characters ==
=== Rem Saverem ===
Voiced by: Aya Hisakawa, Maaya Sakamoto (Trigun Stampede) (Japanese); Ruby Marlowe, Emily Fajardo (Trigun Stampede) (English)

Rem Saverem (レム・セイブレム, Remu Seiburemu) was a crew member of a SEEDS ship from Earth meant to populate another planet. On Earth, Rem had a lover named Alex, and she took part in the mission to start over after his death. In the manga, a sentient Plant was born during the mission and named Tessla. The crew performed extensive tests on Tessla, which Rem and her crew mate, William Conrad, opposed and which ultimately ended in Tessla's dissection and death. Later, Vash and Knives were born; fearing for their safety, Rem kept their birth secret from the other members while they were kept in stasis. In the anime, Vash and Knives were the only sentient Plants whom Rem protected from the other members of the crew. She raised and mentored them. with her teachings of love and peace, especially that no one has the right to take a life, had a profound influence on Vash. Vash wears a red coat because Rem told him about her favorite flower, the Red Geranium, which represents determination. When Knives sabotaged the fleet, putting it on a crash course with the planet, she put him and Vash in an escape pod, but chose to stay behind and attempt to prevent the crash rather than escaping. She managed to undo Knives' tampering, allowing several ships to land safely, but perished when her ship exploded in the atmosphere, with her last words to Vash being "take care of Knives".

=== Nebraska Family ===
Father Nebraska is the patriarch of the Nebraska family, who wears a monocle and has only three teeth. After he and his son Gofsef break out of May prison, where they were serving a prison sentence, he leads the family in an attempt to capture Vash for the bounty placed on him.

Gofsef Nebraska is a giant man who functions as a mode of transport for his father and does his bidding. He has cybernetics, which include a spout on the back that spews out steam and a right arm that can launch his fist like a wrecking ball.

Patricia Nebraska is the matriarch of the Nebraska Family, who is as huge as Gofsef. She has brute strength, which she uses to throw her sons, Kanta, Tonkichi and Chinpei, like shot puts.

Marilyn Nebraska is a young and attractive woman.

=== Kuroneko-sama ===
Voiced by: Satsuki Yukino (Japanese); Bill Timoney (English)

Kuroneko-sama (黒猫様, lit. 'Lady black cat') is a black cat who appears in the background in the anime and manga, appearing in every episode of the anime and randomly in the manga. Nightow has stated that she is something easy and calming to draw in between action scenes. His most common response to queries as to her nature or significance at anime convention panels is "Kuroneko-sama is a small black cat."

In Trigun Maximum, Kuroneko-sama only appears in Nightow's commentary at the end of each issue, often criticizing his lazy and silly nature. She also makes several cameo appearances in the anime adaptation of Nightow's other work, Blood Blockade Battlefront.

=== Roberto De Niro ===
Voiced by: Kenji Matsuda (Japanese); Ben Bryant (English)

An anime exclusive character in Trigun Stampede. He is a veteran journalist for the Bernardelli News Agency. He has many years of experience and acts as Meryl Stryfe´s mentor.
