= Masaya Onosaka =

Japanese voice actor (born 1964)

- 小野坂 昌也
- Born: October 13, 1964 (age 61); Sumiyoshi-ku, Osaka, Japan
- Occupation: Voice actor
- Years active: 1985–present
- Agent: Aoni Production
- Notable credits: Bleach as Shinji Hirako; Bobobo-bo Bo-bobo as Don Patch; The Prince of Tennis as Takeshi Momoshiro; Trigun as Vash the Stampede; Hetalia: Axis Powers as France; Dynasty Warriors and Warriors Orochi as Zhao Yun and Zhuge Liang

Masaya Onosaka (小野坂 昌也, Onosaka Masaya; born October 13, 1964) is a Japanese voice actor who works for Aoni Production. In 2010, he won the "Best Personality" Seiyu Award.

Onosaka was born in Sumiyoshi-ku, Osaka. He is known for his Kansai accent in some of his roles. He is the known dub actor of Zhao Yun and Zhuge Liang in the Japanese version of Dynasty Warriors and Warriors Orochi series.

== Filmography ==
=== Anime television series ===
1986

- Gegege no Kitarō (Kurage no Hinotama)

1990

- Yawara! (Reporter)

1991

- Kingyo Chūihō! (Asaba, *Episode 3*)

1992

- Tsuyoshi Shikkari Shinasai (Tsuyoshi Ikawa)
- Sailor Moon (Jadeite)

1993

- Slam Dunk (Hikoichi Aida, Yasuharu Yasuda)

1994

- Omakase Scrappers (Narimasu, Ten Q)
- Captain Tsubasa J (Ryoma Hino, Announcer)
- Sailor Moon S (Kameda)

1997

- Pokémon (Masaki)
- Detective Conan (Kobayashi)

1998

- Trigun (Vash the Stampede)
- Momoiro Sisters (Keisuke Uchikawa)
- Yoshimoto Muchikko Monogatari (Sashigame Watanabe)

1999

- Omishi Magical Theater Risky Safety (Moe's Father)
- Cardcaptor Sakura (Kerberos - true form)
- Kamikaze Kaitou Jeanne (Kaisei)
- Flint: The Time Detective (Kinokuniya Bunzaemon)
- Chiisana Kyōjin Microman (Arden Flame)
- Power Stone (Fokker)
- Pet Shop of Horrors (Leon Orcot)
- Magic User's Club (Takeo Takakura)

2000

- Pipopapo Patrol-kun (Katsuta Hit)
- One Piece (Chew, Nugire Yainu)

2001

- Angelic Layer (Ichiro Mihara)
- The SoulTaker (Shiro Mibu)
- Shaman King (Ryou Sugimoto)
- The Prince of Tennis (Inakichi Nitobe, Referee, Rick, Takeshi Momoshiro)
- Hajime no Ippo (Takeshi Sendo)

2002

- Ultimate Muscle (Kinniku Mantarou)
- Spiral (Takashi Sonobe)
- Tokyo Mew Mew (Asano-kun)
- Daigunder (Dorimogu)
- Rockman EXE (Torakichi Aragoma)

2003

- Wolf's Rain (Ik)
- Requiem from the Darkness (Fushimiya)
- Digimon Frontier (Skullsatamon)
- Planetes (Boss)
- Bobobo-bo Bo-bobo (Don Patch)

2004

- Galaxy Angel X (Shirō Kazami)
- Kinnikuman Nisei - Ultimate Muscle (Kinniku Mantarou)
- Burst Angel (Azuma Iriki)
- Pokemon Advance (Gai)
- Detective Conan (Masashi Horikoshi)

2005

- Ichigo 100% (Senpai)
- GUNxSWORD (Kaiji)
- Aquarion (Pierre Vieira)
- Beast Machines: Transformers (Obsidian)
- Bleach (Hollow)
- Beet the Vandel Buster Excellion (Nyanjama)
- MÄR (Nanashi)
- One Piece (Spandam)

2006

- Ayakashi (Kikimaru)
- Kanon (Evil Scientist in Movie)
- Kinnikuman Nisei - Ultimate Muscle 2 (Kinniku Mantarou)
- Hell Girl: Two Mirrors (Chikaraya Hashizume)
- Demashitaa! Powerpuff Girls Z (Kabuki Monster)
- Ghost Slayers Ayashi (Shinza)
- Night Head Genesis (Yoshiki Futami)
- NANA (Matsuda)
- Black Jack (Toru Tachibana)
- Black Jack 21 (Pilot)
- Yomigaeru Sora - RESCUE WINGS (Daigo Nihonmatsu)
- One Piece (Spandine)

2007

- Kaiji (Ohta)
- Gegege no Kitarō (Ameburi-Kozou, Hideri-Gami)
- Koutetsu Sangokushi (Masunori Chouhi)
- The Story of Saiunkoku Second Series (Shun)
- Gurren Lagann (Leeron)
- Baccano! (Isaac Dian)
- Bleach (Shinji Hirako)
- Moetan (Ahiru no Ah-kun)
- Lovely Complex (Haruka Fukagawa)

2008

- Gintama (Daisaku Amarao)
- Golgo 13 (Mouse)
- Neo Angelique Abyss (J. D.)
- Neo Angelique Abyss -Second Age- (J. D.)
- Yatterman (Professor Oooku)

2009

- Sgt. Frog (Briefs)
- Saki (Saki's Father)
- Dragon Ball Kai (Butta)
- Hajime no Ippo: New Challenger (Takeshi Sendo)
- Hayate the Combat Butler!! (Gouji Ashibashi)
- Eden of the East (Chief Honda)
- Hetalia: Axis Powers (France)

2010

- Princess Jellyfish (Chief Editor)
- Durarara!! (Isaac Dian, Max Sandshelt)
- Detective Conan (Jirou Imaoka)
- Yu-Gi-Oh! 5D's (Harald)

2011

- The Idolmaster (Oil Baron)
- Twin Angel: Twinkle Paradise (Alexander)
- Toriko (Teppei)
- You're Being Summoned, Azazel (Azazel)

2012

- Horizon in the Middle of Nowhere II (Ben Johnson)
- The Prince of Tennis II (Takeshi Momoshiro)
- Saint Seiya Omega (Hydra Ichi)

2013

- Gintama' (Hajime Obi)
- Hajime no Ippo Rising (Takeshi Sendo)
- Hakkenden: Eight Dogs of the East (Kaede)
- Yondemasu yo, Azazel-san. Z (Azazel)

2014

- Kill la Kill (Kenta Sakuramiya)

2015

- JoJo's Bizarre Adventure: Stardust Crusaders Egypt Arc (Alessi)
- Durarara!!×2 Shō (Max Sandshelt)
- Durarara!! ×2 The Second Arc (Max Sandshelt)
- One-Punch Man (Puri-Puri-Prisoner)

2018

- Cardcaptor Sakura: Clear Card (Kerberos)
- Yo-kai Watch Shadowside (Micchy)

2019

- One-Punch Man 2 (Pri-Pri-Prisoner)

2020

- Yo-kai Watch Jam - Yo-kai Academy Y: Close Encounters of the N Kind (Nozuchika Mitsumatagi)

2021

- Hetalia: World Stars (France)

2022

- The Prince of Tennis II: U-17 World Cup (Rocky Meredith)
- Bleach: Thousand-Year Blood War (Shinji Hirako)

2023

- Trigun Stampede (Radio DJ)

2026

- Nippon Sangoku (Kensuke Taira)

=== Original video animation (OVA) ===
- Be-Bop High School(1990-1998)(Hiroshi Katō)
- Agent Aika (1997) (Shuntarō Michikusa)

Unknown date

- .hack//SIGN (Piroshi)
- Gatchaman (G-1 (Ken the Eagle))
- Magic User's Club (Takeo Takakura)
- Mobile Suit Gundam Seed Astray (Lowe Guele)
- Nineteen 19 (青涩岁月)
- Nurse Witch Komugi (Shiro Mibu)
- Saint Seiya: Hades (Hydra Ichi, Perseus Algol)
- Tales of Symphonia: The Animation (Zelos Wilder)

=== Anime films ===
- Trigun: Badlands Rumble (2010) (Vash the Stampede)
- Gantz: O (2016) (Susumu Kimura)

Unknown date

- Cardcaptor Sakura: The Sealed Card (Cerberus (true form)
- Kinnikuman Nisei (Kinniku Mantarou)
- Millennium Actress (Kyoji Ida)
- Saint Seiya Tenkai Hen: Overture Hydra Ichi
- The Prince of Tennis: The Two Samurai (Takeshi Momoshiro)
- Hetalia: Paint It, White! (France)
- Persona 3 The Movie: No. 2, Midsummer Knight's Dream (Jin Shirato)

=== Video games ===
- Mermaid Prism (2006)
- Persona 3 (2006) (Jin Shirato)
- Bungou to Alchemist (2016) (Oda Sakunosuke)

Unknown date

- .hack (Piroshi)
- AbalaBurn (Kleude)
- Castlevania Judgment (Grant Danasty)
- Dragon Ball series - Burter (2009–present)
- Dragon Quest XI(Sylvando)
- Dynasty Warriors series (Zhao Yun, Zhuge Liang)
- Final Fantasy XIII-2 (Ultros)
- Gungrave (Balladbird Lee)
- Magna Carta (Chris)
- Rogue Galaxy (Simon Wicard)
- Super Robot Wars series (Pierre Vieira, Leeron, Chouhi Gundam)
- Tales of Symphonia (Zelos Wilder)
- Tales of Symphonia: Dawn of the New World (Zelos Wilder)
- Valkyria Chronicles (Leon Schmidt)
- Valkyrie Profile (Jun)
- Valkyrie Profile: Lenneth (Jun)
- Kinnikuman Generations (Kinniku Mantaro)

=== Tokusatsu ===
- Madan Senki Ryukendo (2006) (ZanRyuJin)
- Ressha Sentai ToQger vs. Kyoryuger: The Movie (2015) (Clock Shadow)

=== CD ===
- D.N.Angel "trilogy" (????) (with Soichiro Hoshi and Tomokazu Seki) - "Groovy Blue" (Dark Mousy)

=== CD drama ===
- Abunai series 3: Abunai Bara to Yuri no Sono
- Abunai series 4: Abunai Campus Love (Wachi Okikura)
- Ace Attorney Investigations (Larry Butz)
- Aka no Shinmon (Kazukiyo Okuda)
- Boxer Wa Inu Ni Naru series 3: Raibaru mo Inu wo Daku (Coach Nishizaki)
- D.N.Angel Wink series (Dark Mousy)
- Eden wo Tooku ni Hanarete series 1: Kami yo, Izuko no Rakuen (Seiichitou Tsubakimoto)
- Eden wo Tooku ni Hanarete series 2: Ryokuin no Rakuen (Seiichitou Tsubakimoto)
- Eden wo Tooku ni Hanarete series 3: Setsunai Yoru no Rakuen (Seiichitou Tsubakimoto)
- Hetalia - Axis Powers (France)
- Sakurazawa vs Hakuhou series 1: Shokuinshitsu de Naisho no Romance (Kazuhiro Okamoto)
- Tales of Symphonia Rodeo Ride Tour (Zelos Wilder)
- Tales of Symphonia A Long Time Ago (Zelos Wilder)

=== CD singles ===
- The Prince of Tennis The Best Of Seigaku Players series (IX) - "Jump" (Takeshi Momoshiro)
- The Prince of Tennis On the Radio Theme series (September, 2004) - "SAYONARA" (Takeshi Momoshiro)
- Hetalia - Axis Powers With Love From Iceland - "With Love From Iceland" (Mr. Puffin)

=== Dubbing ===
- Beast Machines: Transformers (Obsidian)
- South Park: Bigger, Longer & Uncut (Jimbo Kearn)
