= Vash the Stampede =

Fictional character from Trigun

- Trigun character
- Artwork by Yasuhiro Nightow of Vash the Stampede in Trigun Maximum.
- First appearance: Chapter 1: "The $$60,000,000,000 Man" (May 30, 1995)
- Created by: Yasuhiro Nightow
- Voiced by: Japanese; Masaya Onosaka (adult); Kōki Miyata (child); Yoshitsugu Matsuoka (adult, Trigun Stampede); Tomoyo Kurosawa (child, Trigun Stampede); English; Johnny Yong Bosch (adult); Bryce Papenbrook (child); Kristen McGuire (child, Trigun Stampede)

In-universe information
- Relatives: Millions Knives (twin brother); Rem Saverem (adoptive mother; deceased)

Vash the Stampede (Japanese: ヴァッシュ・ザ・スタンピード, Hepburn: Vasshu za Sutanpīdo) is the protagonist of Trigun, a manga series created by Yasuhiro Nightow in 1995. Set on the planet No Man's Land, Vash is the most feared outlaw who has earned a bounty of $$60 billion ("double dollar") on his head and the nickname "The Humanoid Typhoon" (人間台風) after accidentally destroying a city with his supernatural powers. He is a skilled gunman who battles bounty hunters and assassins working for his twin brother, Millions Knives. Despite his reputation, Vash displays a kindhearted personality by befriending citizens and refusing to murder his enemies.

Nightow created Vash as a strong gunner who would stand out because of his pacifist ways, traits that are different from those of the stereotypical protagonist of action films. The manga was adapted for television as an anime series in which Vash was voiced by Masaya Onosaka as an adult and Kōki Miyata as a child. For the English dub, Johnny Yong Bosch voices him as an adult and Bryce Papenbrook as a child. The character also appears in the 2010 film Trigun: Badlands Rumble, among other one-shots. Nightow was surprised at Vash's popularity with Western audiences.

Critics praised the mixture of seriousness and goofiness of Vash's character. However, his pacifism received a more mixed response. While some reviewers praised it as a part of Vash's heroic traits, others disliked the negative consequences when his pacifist choices failed. He remains popular in the anime adaptation and has appeared in multiple "best character" lists and articles. Onosaka and Bosch were praised for their performances.

== Concept and creation ==
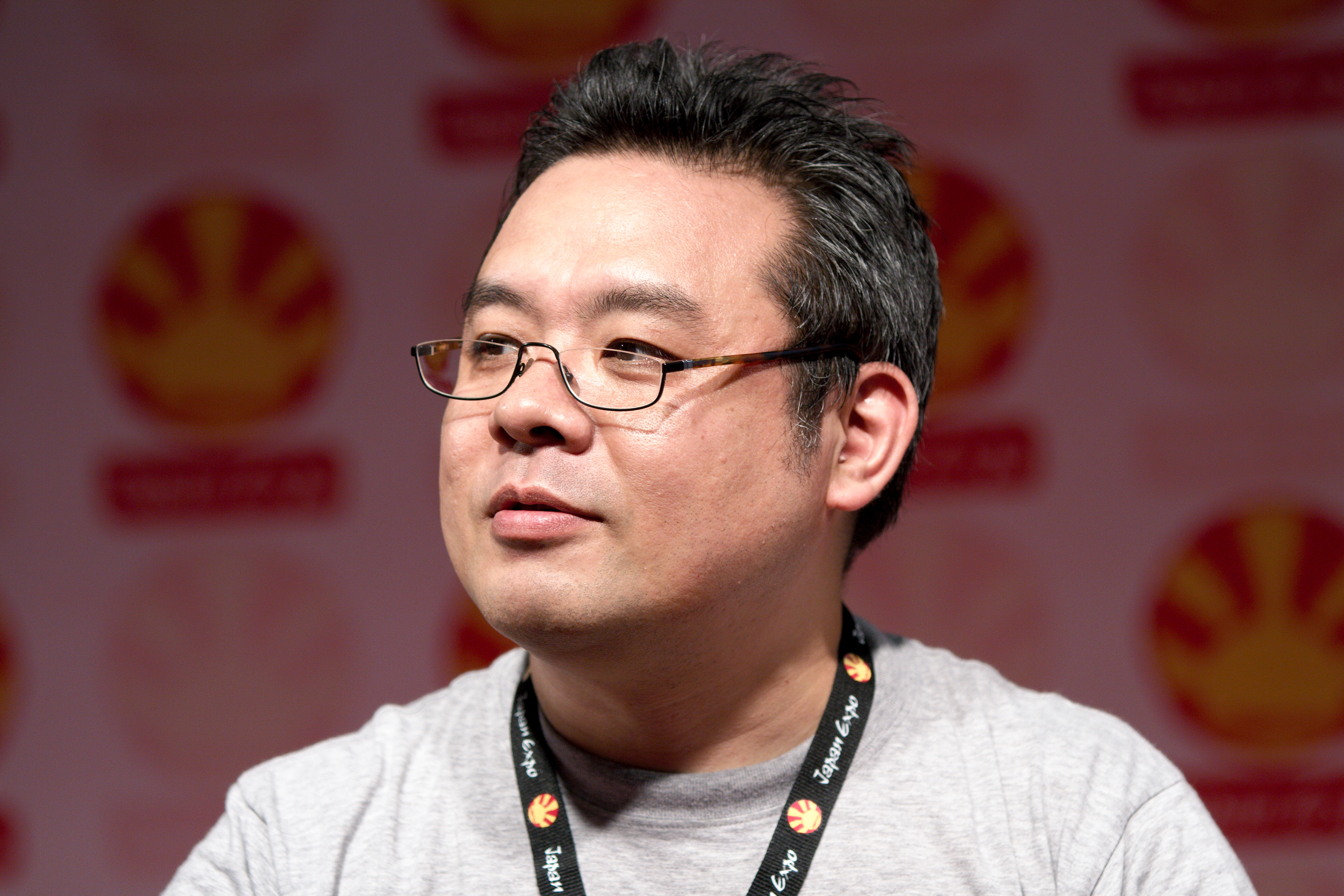
Yasuhiro Nightow created Vash the Stampede.

Trigun manga author Yasuhiro Nightow has stated that Vash's name was his own creation rather than references to bands he gave to other members from the cast. He developed Vash as having a serious personality with a childish side, and found him to be the most relatable of all his creations. To contrast Vash from the typical heroes in action films, Nightow portrayed him as a pacifist since he did not want his lead character to be a murderer. Throughout the story, Vash avoids killing enemies by disarming them and avoids inflicting mortal wounds during combat. His cheerful personality was used to highlight this trait with his catchphrase being: "Hey, sorry. Love and peace?" To emphasize that Vash is an experienced gunman, Nightow depicted him as having a strong eyesight that gives him a more precise aim. While making the series, he was surprised by Vash's popularity with Western readers.

Comparing Vash's manga characterization with his anime persona, Nightow said his version does not have as many crushes on the women he meets. To create suspense, writer Yōsuke Kuroda suggested that Vash would not shoot a bullet until the fifth episode. While the Vash from the early episodes was portrayed as comical, following episodes reveal a more deeper the character hides. Kuroda claims that Nicholas D. Wolfwood serves as both Vash's ally and rival at the same time whereas Million Knives' first appearance in the anime was used to tell the protagonist's backstory. Character designer Yoshimatsu Takahiro expressed appreciation for Vash's pacifist values.

Vash's characterization in Stampede was created to give him a less experienced portrayal that rejects violence and through his character arc, learns to deal with it. His bounty and expressions are meant to portray him as younger than the original Vash with the first arc's ending highlighting his transformation into the classic Vash with his design acting as symbolism to it. Takei wants the narrative to focus on the depths of Vash which lead to more scenes about his backstory. Takei stated that while in the original manga and the previous anime adaptations the story is always centered around Vash, in Trigun Stampede they "really want to focus on the depth of Vash", so they decided to focus on his origin, memories, and the time he spent with Rem and Knives. Stargaze grabs the same character according to Director Masako Sato who wanted to portray as a person who cannot be truly righteous. He further wanted to keep pointing the differences between him and his brother while also exploring his sensitive side the more episodes air.

=== Design ===
To make Vash's appearance distinctive, Nightow often changed the character's hair color throughout the serialization. Although fans questioned if this was relevant to the story, Nightow chose not to reveal his reason for it. In the series' climax, it is revealed that Vash's blond hair turning black is a secondary effect of overusing his supernatural powers. Despite his efforts in his design, Nightow regrets giving Vash and antagonist Legato Bluesummers detailed eyes because he drew them inconsistently in the manga. Vash's red coat was inspired by Todd McFarlane's Spawn, which Nightow is a fan of.

Nightow had trouble designing Vash's gun as he aimed it to look visually attractive and effective to use. Although he originally wanted to create a gun with unlimited bullets, he replaced it with a traditional one after consulting a picture of an upside-down barrel for inspiration. Besides Vash's guns, Nightow portrayed him as having a supernatural power known as the "Angel Arms," in which his arms mutate to form a weapon. The Angel Arms adopt a feminine form and can create or give birth to matter.

In 2023, a new Trigun anime was made, Stampede. Studio Orange sought to appeal to the audience and had to alter Vash's design for this reboot. Producers Katsuhiro Takei had been a fan of the series since reading the manga as a teenager and liked the protagonist due to his values.

=== Voice actors ===
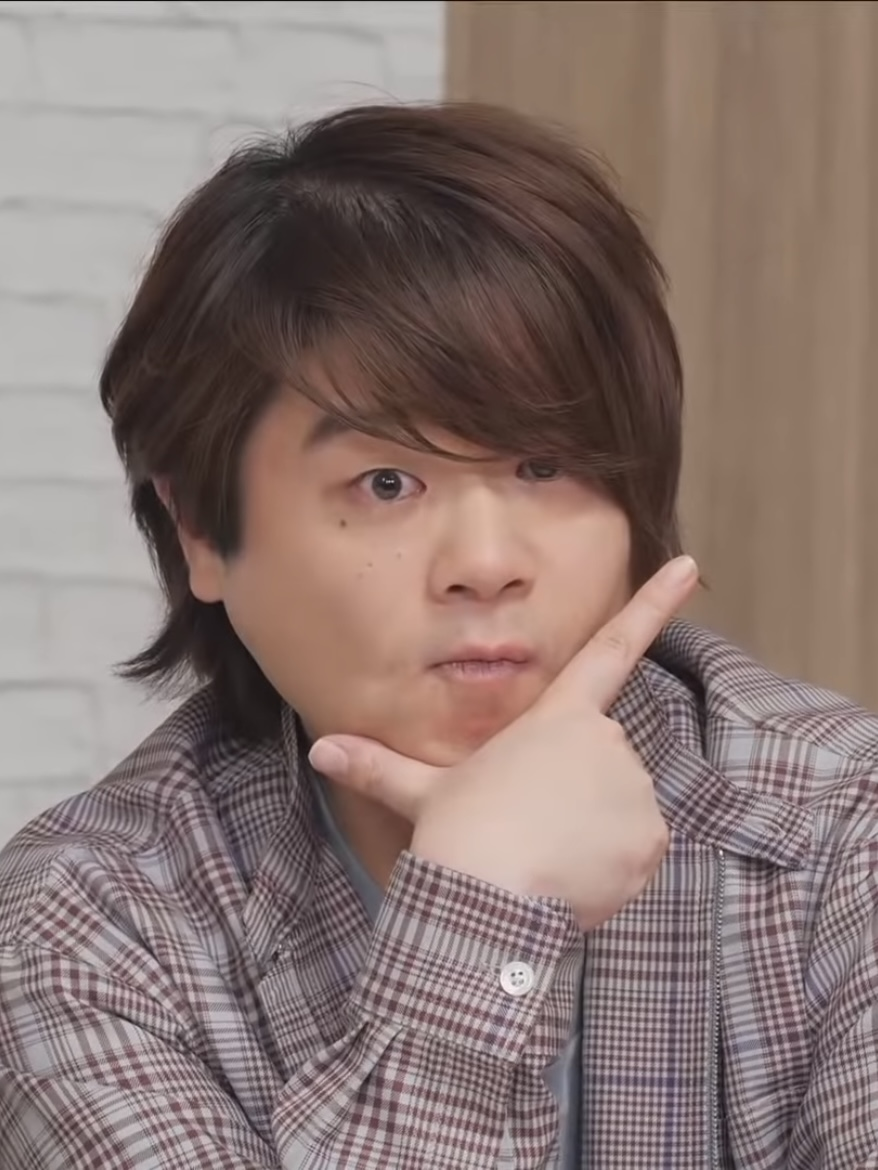
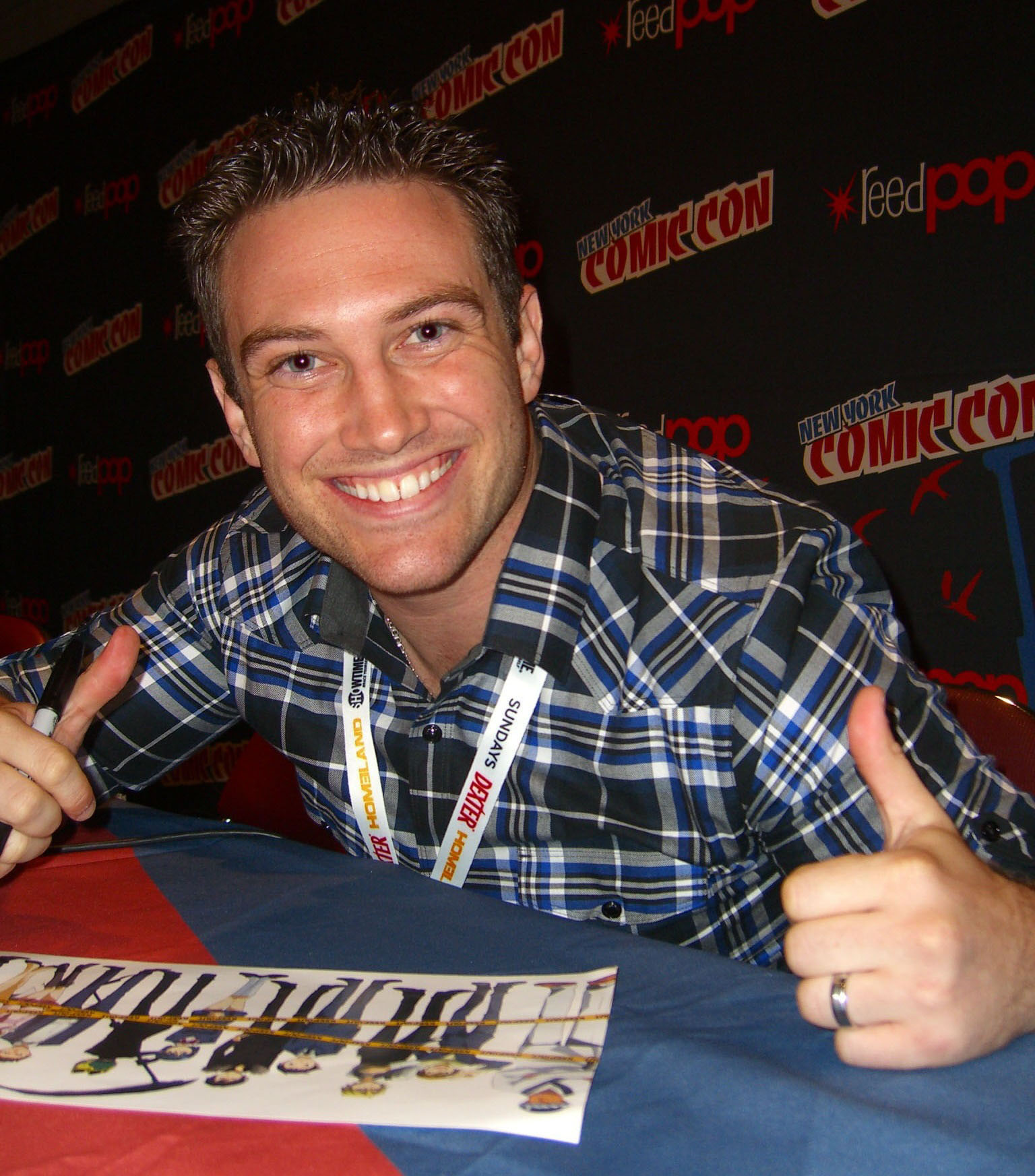
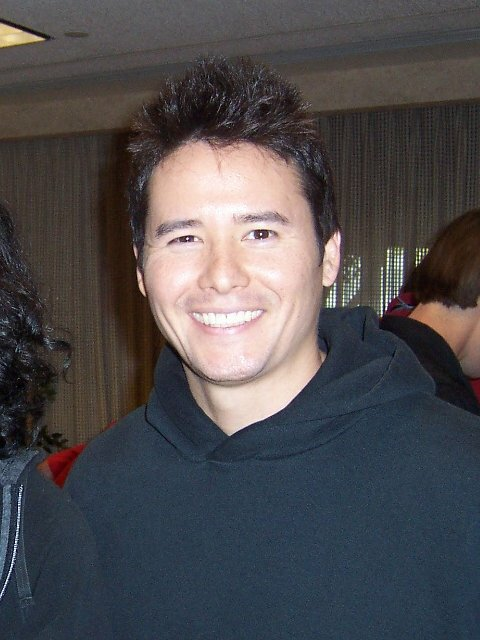
Yoshitsugu Matsuoka voices Vash in Stampede. Bryce Papenbrook and Johnny Yong Bosch voiced Vash in the English dub of the series.

Masaya Onosaka started voicing Vash in the anime, which premiered in Japan in 1998. Onosaka said he was unaware when the 2010 film, Trigun: Badlands Rumble, would be made and that most of the cast and crew felt left in the dark for a long time before production began. After the film's announcement, Onosaka was happy to see his character featured in theaters for the first time and to work with the Trigun cast for the first time since the anime ended twelve years earlier. New voice actor Maaya Sakamoto said she liked being involved in the film because she interpreted Vash through her character, a bounty hunter named Amelia Ann McFly, who starred in the movie as a lead. Kōki Miyata voiced the young Vash.

For Trigun Stampede, Vash is voiced by Yoshitsugu Matsuoka in his adult persona and Tomoyo Kurosawa as a child. Matsuoka used to watch the original Trigun anime during high school years and was grateful for being cast as well as nervous. He claims that Vash's charm comes from his straightforward personality and his hidden shades which makes his work challenging as he has to portray both of the protagonist's seriousness and cheerfulness. Masako Sato was moved to tears when recording one of Matsuoka's lines which made him feel he really fits the character.

Johnny Yong Bosch started his voice acting career by providing Vash's voice in Trigun's English-dubbed version. He had never heard of the series until he was hired for the role. According to Bosch, most of the fan responses to his performance were positive, and Nightow found his performance to be appealing. Bosch attributed his positive reception to the story and casting director. He enjoyed Vash's traits, specifically his pacifist philosophies alongside the catchphrase: "This world is made of love and peace!" Vash's younger self from the flashbacks is voiced by Bryce Papenbrook. Bosch is also reprising his role for the English dub of Stampede expressing gratitude for being able to portray him again.

== Appearances ==
=== Trigun and Trigun Maximum ===
The origins of Vash and his twin brother Millions Knives are explored in flashbacks from the Trigun manga when the children live in a spaceship containing the last few surviving humans who have fled Earth due to its lack of resources. The two are identified as "Plants" since they age at a slower rate. They are raised by a researcher named Rem Saverem in a space ship colony. Through Rem's education, Vash gains a newfound respect for life, but his brother seeks the mayhem in mankind. Knives disrupts the navigation system, triggering an alarm and waking the dormant passengers. When Knives sabotages the fleet, putting it on a crash course with the planet No-man's Land, Rem puts him and Vash in an escape pod to save them. Rem chooses to stay behind and attempts to prevent the crash rather than escaping. As the two children become young adults, they separate, with Knives amputating Vash's left arm in a fight. Vash is found by a group of humans who construct his cybernetic arm. Knives also attempts to activate Vash's dormant supernatural powers, the Angel Arm, but the plan backfires and a blast obliterates the city of July, leaving 200,000 people without food or shelter. The incident earns Vash's reputation as "The Humanoid Typhoon".

When the Trigun manga begins, Vash travels around the planet searching for Knives. He befriends Meryl Stryfe and Milly Thompson, two agents of the Bernardelli Insurance Society, sent to evaluate claims regarding the dangers he has caused and whether or not his bounty should be canceled. He also meets a priest named Nicholas D. Wolfwood, who fights alongside him. Vash is targeted by Legato Bluesummers from the Gung-ho Guns assassins who are followers of Knives. After Legato confronts Vash, Knives reappears. A shocked Vash requests evacuation for Meryl and Milly because of the danger his brother presents. Knives then tries to use Vash's Angel Arm to destroy another city, but Vash resists and redirects the blast upward, where it hits one of No-man's moons.

In the Trigun Maximum manga, which occurs two years after the moon's destruction, Wolfwood discovers Vash relating Knives' exploits in regards to mankind's extinction. In facing Legato's group, Vash fears that they have discovered the location of his home, resulting in the deaths of his friends. Vash learns a ship has made contact with Earth and will be arriving to save them from No-man's Land. Knives uses his powers as a Plant to shut down the satellites used to communicate with Earth. Vash learns of the severed connection and guesses its cause. Gung-ho Guns Hoppered the Gauntlet, a survivor of July, seeks revenge on Vash, but is killed by his partners as Knives ordered them not to kill their target but tormenting him. Vash and Wolfwood continue traveling to Knives' base. However, Vash is defeated and restrained by Legato. Wolfwood, revealed as a member of the Gung-ho Guns, rescues Vash.

Vash rejoins Wolfwood, who fights with Gung-ho Gun Livio to the death. When Wolfwood dies, Livio, Wolfwood's childhood friend, joins Vash' cause while grieving for his friend's death. As Knives approaches the city with the "Ark", a floating ship designed to leave humans without any resources and end life on the planet, Knives begins dueling with Vash. Throughout his past battles that required him to use the Angel's Arm, Vash has transformed into a regular human signified by his blond hair now turned black. Vash breaks his pacifist vow by killing Legato to protect Livio from the last Gung-ho Guns. Knives also starts losing the powers he stored with the Ark through Vash's actions. Vash then saves his brother from the vengeful ships from Earth. Following his defeat, Knives uses his last powers to help his weakened brother by creating a small fruit tree to feed him. After his brother's death, Vash continues his travels on the planet with Meryl and Milly.

=== Adaptations ===
==== In the first anime ====
In the anime, No-Man's Land is an unnamed planet. While wandering the planet with Knives, Vash shoots his brother for trying to kill more people. Vash is rescued by a group of humans from the only remaining functioning ships on the planet and leaves after a few months. He goes to July in the hopes of meeting Rem's friends but finds Knives has killed them. In the ensuing firefight, Knives shoots off Vash's left arm which activates his White Angel Arm, resulting in July's destruction. Throughout the series, Vash feels pressure to avoid killing his enemies. As the two interact, Wolfwood decides to be a pacifist like Vash, but is killed by one of Knives' men. Bringing Vash further grief is Legato who controls the civilians targeting Meryl and Milly. This forces Vash to kill Legato in order to save his friends. Despite being initially shocked by the idea of committing a sin, Vash find peace when Meryl says any person can find redemption regardless of action. Vash faces and defeats Knives whose fate is ambiguous. Vash then decides to adopt a new way of life, discarding the red coat that marked Rem's influences over him. The anime ends as Vash returns with his brother's body to Meryl and Milly.

==== Other works ====
Besides the anime, Vash appears in the 2010 Trigun film, Badlands Rumble, in which he travels to Macca City where he meets a bounty hunter named Amelia Ann McFly. Seeking revenge against a thief named Gasback, Amelia joins Vash and Wolfwood in a quest to capture him. Amelia decides to follow Vash's example and does not kill Gasback, but allows him to be taken into custody. Vash also appears in a manga anthology of alternative stories; Vash being the protagonist who, along with Wolfwood, protects a village from thieves. In the sequel to the manga by Boichi, Vash meets another Plant who seeks her own death.

==== Trigun Stampede and Trigun Stargaze ====
In Trigun Stampede an alternate Vash explains to Meryl and Roberto De Nero that he has been mistakenly accused of stealing plants when it is really Knives who is responsible. After a confrontation with his brother that results in tragedy, Vash takes his leave and heads east towards July City to pursue Knives. As the anime continues, Vash is revealead to be from the human colonization fleet where it is revealed that both Vash and Knives are Independents, human-like beings born from regular plants. He regretted trusting Knives with the command codes for the ships which he used to sabotage and destroy most of the fleet. Suffering from guilt, Vash wandered the desert where he was rescued by the survivors of Ship Three, led by Luida Leitner. As he spends more time with them, Vash is accepted by the humans. Vash is dropped into a tank, where Knives forcefully initiates mental connection with him. Knives intends to synchronize with Vash, using his unique ability to open a two-way gate to the higher dimension. Knives plans to use the core to give every plant a soul, making them all Independents and guaranteeing humanity's extinction. Vash resists as Knives manipulates his memories and shows him that there was a third Independent child on their ship who was used for cruel experiments. Meryl pleads with Vash to wake up, and her voice ultimately causes him to regains his senses, ejecting Knives whom he ends up defeating. In the aftermath, Vash impacts in July City, inadvertently destroying the entire city. Two years later, Vash has become a fugitive again, with the remaining cities posting an unprecedented $$60 billion bounty on his head.

In Trigun Stargaze, Vash is captured by a victim from July who wishes to kills him in revenge. While Vash takes the blame and accepts the idea of being killed, the enemy forces Vash to kill him instead so that he will keep suffering in his life. The more Vash travels, he encounters his friends again who comfort him as they claim he will never be alone. Vash and Wolfwood keep fighting Gun-ho soldiers whose leader Knives is healing after being nearly killed in Stampede. Vash eventually tries to keep one of Knives' soldiers but he is stopped by his brother who has become a stronger Plant following a recovery. Knives absorbs Vash as he uses his powers to kill mankind. However, as Vash tries to fight back, he learns Knives is mourning the death of their sister Tesla whom Rem failed to save. Realizing the pain Knives is hiding, Vash tries to save his brother who is fighting mankind's forces. Knives chooses to die and Vash returns to his No Gun Lands where he happily reunites with his friends.

== Reception ==
Vash's redesign in Stampede resulted in mixed comments from the media.

=== Popularity ===
Vash was ranked second in the 1998 Annual Anime Grand Prix in the Male Character Category behind Spike Spiegel from Cowboy Bebop. In 2000, the Society for the Promotion of Japanese Animation awarded Vash the Best Male Character, U.S. Release award. Anime News Network listed him and Wolfwood as one of the biggest "fiercest frenemies" because of their constant struggles and consistent friendship. AnimeNation considered Vash one of the most popular 1990s characters along with Spike Spiegel and Sakura Kinomoto from Cardcaptor Sakura manga.

In 2009, Vash the Stampede was ranked 17th in IGN's Top Anime Characters of All Time, and Nightow was praised for how well Trigun's lead is designed. IGN ranked him as the 20th greatest anime character of all time in 2014 because of the balance displayed between his goofiness and grief in the narrative. HobbyConsolas listed Vash as one of the coolest characters in anime based on his skills and personality. In another poll, Vash was voted the second-best Masaya Onosaka character after France from Hetalia: Axis Powers. Vash has been the used in merchandise, including action figures, plush dolls, keychains, clothes, and cosplay sunglasses.

The lead singer of Mushroomhead wore a Vash the Stampede coat in many concerts before it was stolen from his dressing room. Vash also made a cameo appearance in Boichi's gangster manga Sun-Ken Rock, when the cast goes to watch the Trigun film.

=== Critical response ===
Critical reception to the character has been positive. Anime News Network stated Vash seems to have been influenced by Western films and compared him with Himura Kenshin from the Rurouni Kenshin manga because of their pacifism. Manga Life compared Vash's way of life with that of the American Midwest in the 1800s. They called his characterization "fantastic" based on the personality he displays when facing enemies as he refuses to murder anybody. When more of the character's past is revealed because of his conflict with his enemies, Manga Life said Vash's true self makes him more engaging, something which is expanded by the artwork. Vash's reintroduction in Maximum drew positive comments with a reviewer from Mania Entertainment saying both new and existing readers would be attracted by the restart of Vash's journey after moments of peace. In a later review, however, Mania Entertainment said some events that happened to Vash might come across as repetitive because his pacifism keeps backfiring and no proper solution has yet been given. As Vash's philosophy was tested in the finale, Fandom Post praised the consequences of his actions. BlerdsOnline noted Vash got so much grief the reader would also feel it when reading the manga. Gun Sword director Goro Taniguchi received feedback about its lead Van being too similar to Vash due to how they avoid fights which he replied that he created Van to be portrayed as a lazy character rather than the pacifist fighter. Website Gizmodo also found similarities between Vash and Vinland Saga protagonist Thorfinn over their similar pacifist natures which led to manga author Makoto Yukimura replying that while their stories are similar, he wanted to start Vinland Saga by portraying his protagonist as a rude and violent character who would change across the narrative obtain the values other pacifists characters show. Kouta Hirano noted that Alucard's design from Hellsing drew comparisons to Vash, leading him to regret adding sunglasses.

Journalists have also commented on Vash's role in Madhouse's adaptation of the manga. Escapist Magazine regarded Vash's characterization as one of the most intriguing aspects of Trigun because while being a pacifist, he fights to protect others and despite his victories, he is never seen as overpowered. AnimeOnDVD enjoyed him for "running a gamut of emotions and attitudes" while displaying multiple skills that made him the most powerful fighter on the planet. The reviewer also said the change in Vash's character makes him more interesting to watch in the darker scenarios. Vash's backstory and its effect on him were described as "really interesting" because it would prompt questions from the audience. T.H.E.M. Anime Reviews called Vash "the poster-child for the misunderstood hero". Similarly, Anime News Network praised Vash's characterization for avoiding cliches often seen in Western stories. AnimeNation compared Vash with Abel Nightroad from the Trinity Blood anime based on their similar traits, saying they might be interpreted as identical characters. In the book Anime Impact: The Movies and Shows that Changed the World of Japanese Animation, Chris Stuckmann compares Vash with John McClane from the Die Hard action films because of the similar misunderstandings the two go through while facing enemies.

Some critics commented on Vash's relationship with Knives. His final fight against Knives was seen as another well-developed scenario by ANN. Escapist compared Vash and Knives to yin and yang because of their contrasting natures, which made their antagonism more appealing. Comic Book Bin also made this comparison, suggesting they subtly parallel Cain and Abel from the Book of Genesis because of how much Knives wants to torment his brother. By the manga's climax, Mania claimed the fight between these two characters was "the stuff of legend." The show's entry in The Encyclopedia of Science Fiction says that Wolfwood is Vash's philosophical counterpoint, being prepared to kill for the greater good in contrast to Vash's pacifist idealism.

Critics also commented on the Badlands Rumble portrayal of Vash. DVD Talk enjoyed it, stating his characterization would appeal to the audience. UK Anime Network said the character delivers the series' original pacifist message despite the attention given to comedy. Otaku USA said that Vash's portrayal in the movie is true to his character in the television series. ANN had mixed thoughts about Vash's movie persona. While finding this portrayal faithful to the original one, ANN said Vash's act as a lazy character takes too much time until his true self is revealed. Bosch's performance was praised nevertheless. BlerdsOnline noted it was one of Nightow's strongest points when writing Trigun Maximum, along with the antagonism Vash has with Knives. Elena M. Aponte from Bowling Green State University said that while Vash is constantly escaping from violence, he is responsible for creating major chaos with his Angel Arm which was compared with the nuclear bomb used to end World War II. Vash's values about wanting to protect others regardless of danger are challenged by Wolfwood due to his remark of his pacifism and it is not only until the manga's climax that Vash decides to use violence for the first time in life to kill a person in order protect Livio from Legato.

Vash's redesign in Stampede was praised by Polygon for its sex appeal as well as how Orange animates him, with FictionHorizon agreeing and adding that his movements were fluid. On the other hand, Anime News Network provided different comments in regards to Vash's design as whether or not he is as appealing as the original created by Nightow. UK Anime Network criticized Vash for coming across as "more of an emo-peacenik" than his iconic persona to the point he feels like a different character.

Reviewers also commented on Vash's voice actors with Escapist praising Bosch's work. On the other hand, DVDTalk found Onosaka's work better than Bosch's. Similarly, despite being praised for his childish take on Vash, Bosch's acting was criticized as unfitting when Vash sounds serious by Japanator. As a result, the reviewer recommended Onosaka instead. UK Anime Network enjoyed Vash's role in Nightow's first one-shot from Multiple Bullets, but criticized Boichi's portrayal of him as childish and almost like a Mary Sue.
