= Brad Hawkins =

American actor

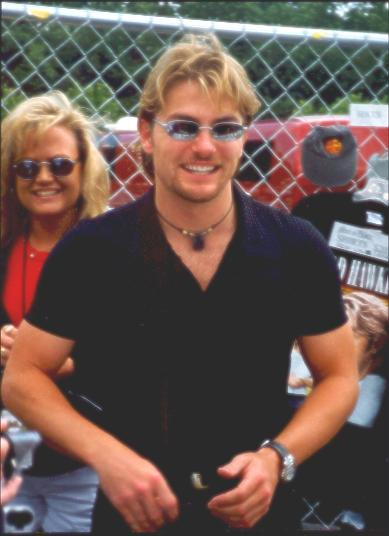
- Hawkins in 1998
- Born: January 13, 1974 (age 52); Summerville, South Carolina, U.S.
- Education: Plano Senior High School
- Occupations: Actor; martial artist; singer
- Years active: 1994–present
- Musical career
- Genre: Country
- Instrument: Vocals
- Label: Curb

Brad Hawkins (born January 13, 1974) is an American actor, martial artist, and country music singer. He is best known for playing Ryan Steele in Saban's action adventure science fantasy series VR Troopers (1994–1996, and with 92 total episode appearances) and for his role in the 2014 film Boyhood. He also provided the (uncredited) voice of Trey of Triforia, the Gold Ranger in Power Rangers Zeo. In 1999, he starred as Tyler Hart in the CBS miniseries Shake, Rattle and Roll: An American Love Story, filmed in North Carolina (Charlotte and Mooresville).

Before becoming an actor, he attended Plano Senior High School in Plano, Texas, graduating in 1992. He was a country music singer for three years in Nashville. He signed to Curb Records in 1997 and charted the single "We Lose". He starred in the slasher film Shredder in 2003. He also provided motion capture for early prototypes of id Software's Doom 2016. He also works as a voice actor, often with Funimation, including roles in D.Gray-man, Dragonaut: The Resonance, and Goblin Slayer.

== Discography ==
=== Singles ===
Year	Single	Peak positions
Year	Single	US Country
1998	"We Lose"	68
1998	"I'm the One"	—
"—" denotes releases that did not chart

=== Music videos ===
Year	Video	Director
1998	"We Lose"	Chris Kraft
1998	"I'm the One"	

== Filmography ==
=== Anime ===
- A Certain Scientific Railgun – Wataru Kurozuma
- Black Clover – Lotus Whomalt
- Blassreiter – Igor
- D.Gray-man – Tyki Mikk
- Dragonaut: The Resonance – Howlingstar
- Fairy Tail – Bloodman
- Fullmetal Alchemist: Brotherhood – Yakovlev
- Future Diary – Marco Ikusaba (7th)
- Goblin Slayer – Goblin Slayer
- Joker Game – Amari
- My Hero Academia – Shikkui Makabe
- One Piece – Vigaro, Diamante (Funimation dub)
- Trigun: Badlands Rumble – Nicholas D. Wolfwood

=== Live-action ===
- Step by Step – Chuck
- VR Troopers – Ryan Steele
- Shake, Rattle and Roll: An American Love Story – Tyler Hart
- Prison Break – Tough Guy No. 2, Cop No. 2
- Monk – Kurt Wolff (Season 3 Episode 'Mr. Monk and the Panic Room')
- Charmed – Vassen
- CSI: Crime Scene Investigation – Tough Guy No. 2, Cop No. 2; Justin Mack (Season 4 Episode 'Turn of the Screws')
- Hope Ranch – Ajax
- The Good Guys – TV Stark
- Chase – SOG Marshall Barnes
- Wire in the Blood – Darius Grady
- Continuum (web series) – Tipton
- Boyhood – Jim

=== Voice over ===
- Power Rangers Zeo – Trey of Triforia/Gold Ranger

=== Video games ===
- Comic Jumper: The Adventures of Captain Smiley – Brad (vocals)
