= Trigun =

Japanese manga series

- First tankōbon volume cover, featuring Vash the Stampede

トライガン (Toraigan)
- Genre: Action; Post-apocalyptic; Space Western
- Manga
- Written by: Yasuhiro Nightow
- Published by: Tokuma Shoten (former); Shōnen Gahōsha
- English publisher: NA: Dark Horse Comics
- Imprint: Shōnen Captain Comics Special (Tokuma Shoten); Young King Comics (Shōnen Gahōsha)
- Magazine: Monthly Shōnen Captain
- Original run: March 25, 1995 – December 26, 1996
- Volumes: 3 (Tokuma Shoten); 2 (Shōnen Gahōsha)
- Manga

Trigun Maximum
- Written by: Yasuhiro Nightow
- Published by: Shōnen Gahōsha
- English publisher: NA: Dark Horse Comics
- Imprint: Young King Comics
- Magazine: Young King OURs
- Original run: October 1997 – March 2007
- Volumes: 14
- Anime television series
- 1998 TV series; Trigun Stampede (2023); Trigun Stargaze (2026)
- Anime film
- Trigun: Badlands Rumble (2010)
- icon

Trigun (Japanese: トライガン, Hepburn: Toraigan) is a Japanese manga series written and illustrated by Yasuhiro Nightow. It was first serialized in Tokuma Shoten's shōnen manga magazine Monthly Shōnen Captain from March 1995 to December 1996, at which time the magazine ceased publication. Its chapters were collected in three tankōbon volumes. The series continued its publication in Shōnen Gahosha's seinen manga magazine Young King OURs, under the title Trigun Maximum, from October 1997 to March 2007. Shōnen Gahosha republished the Trigun chapters in two volumes and collected the Trigun Maximum chapters in fourteen volumes. Set on the fictional planet known as No Man's Land, the plot follows Vash the Stampede, a famous gunman constantly fighting bounty hunters seeking the immense bounty on his head. Trigun originated from Nightow's fascination with Western movies, with Vash standing out due to his pacifist nature.

Trigun was adapted into a 26-episode anime television series by Madhouse that aired on TV Tokyo from April to October 1998. An anime feature film, Trigun: Badlands Rumble, premiered in Japan in April 2010. Orange produced a reboot anime television series titled Trigun Stampede, premiered in 2023, which was followed by a sequel, Trigun Stargaze, in 2026. In North America, both manga series have been licensed by Dark Horse Comics.

In 2009, Trigun Maximum won the Best Comic category at the 40th Seiun Awards. Critical response to the manga has been generally positive, with praise for Vash and his friends' actions and relationships as well as the handling of action scenes. However, criticism has been directed to the art that sometimes makes it hard to distinguish what is going on during reading.

== Plot ==
In a distant future, a man known as Vash the Stampede has earned a bounty of $$60 billion ("double dollar") on his head and the nickname "The Humanoid Typhoon" (人間台風) after accidentally destroying a city with his supernatural powers. However, whenever he is attacked, Vash displays a pacifist personality, as noted by two Bernardelli Insurance Society employees, Meryl Stryfe and Milly Thompson, who follow him around to minimize the damages inevitably caused by his appearance. Most of the damage attributed to Vash is caused by bounty hunters in pursuit of his bounty. However, he cannot remember the incident due to retrograde amnesia, being able to recall fragments of the destroyed city and memories of his childhood. Throughout his travels, Vash tries to save lives using non-lethal force. He is occasionally joined by a priest, Nicholas D. Wolfwood, who, like Vash, is a superb gunfighter with a mysterious past. As the series progresses, more about Vash's past and the history of human civilization on the planet is revealed.

Vash and his twin brother Knives were originally two children with a slow-aging process found in a spaceship who escaped from Earth after mankind had exhausted all its resources. Rem raised them, but Knives became nihilistic and had most of the people in the ship disposed of. As a result, Vash lives to find his twin and have revenge. Vash is targeted by Legato Bluesummers from the Gung-ho Guns assassins who are followers of Knives. Vash and Knives both possess the Angel Arm, which Knives forced Vash to use to destroy the city of July, ending the Trigun manga in a cliffhanger as the true nature behind Vash's identity is questioned by Wolfwood after seeing the power.

In Trigun Maximum, Wolfwood finds the missing Vash and both continue their fight against the Gung-go Guns, which often causes the two clash with each other over Vash's obsession with pacifism. Hoppered the Gauntlet, a survivor of July, seeks revenge on Vash, but is killed by his partners as Knives ordered them not to kill their target but tormenting him. Vash eventually fights Knives, but is defeated. However, Wolfwood, revealed to be one of Knives' subordinates, betrays him and saves Vash. In the aftermath, Wolfwood dies after using a drug during fighting one of the Gung-Hos; his friend, Livio, joins Vash's cause as he grieves for his friend's death. As Knives approaches the city with the Ark, a floating ship designed to leave humans without any resources and end life on the planet, Knives begins dueling with Vash. Following his past battles that required him to use the Angel's Arm, Vash has transformed into a regular human, as signified by his blond hair turning black. Vash breaks his pacifist vow by killing Legato to protect Livio. Knives also starts losing the powers he stored with the Ark through Vash's actions. Vash then saves his brother from the vengeful ships from Earth. Following his defeat, Knives uses his remaining power to help his weakened brother by creating a small fruit tree to feed him. After his brother's death, Vash continues his travels on the planet with Meryl and Milly.

== Production ==
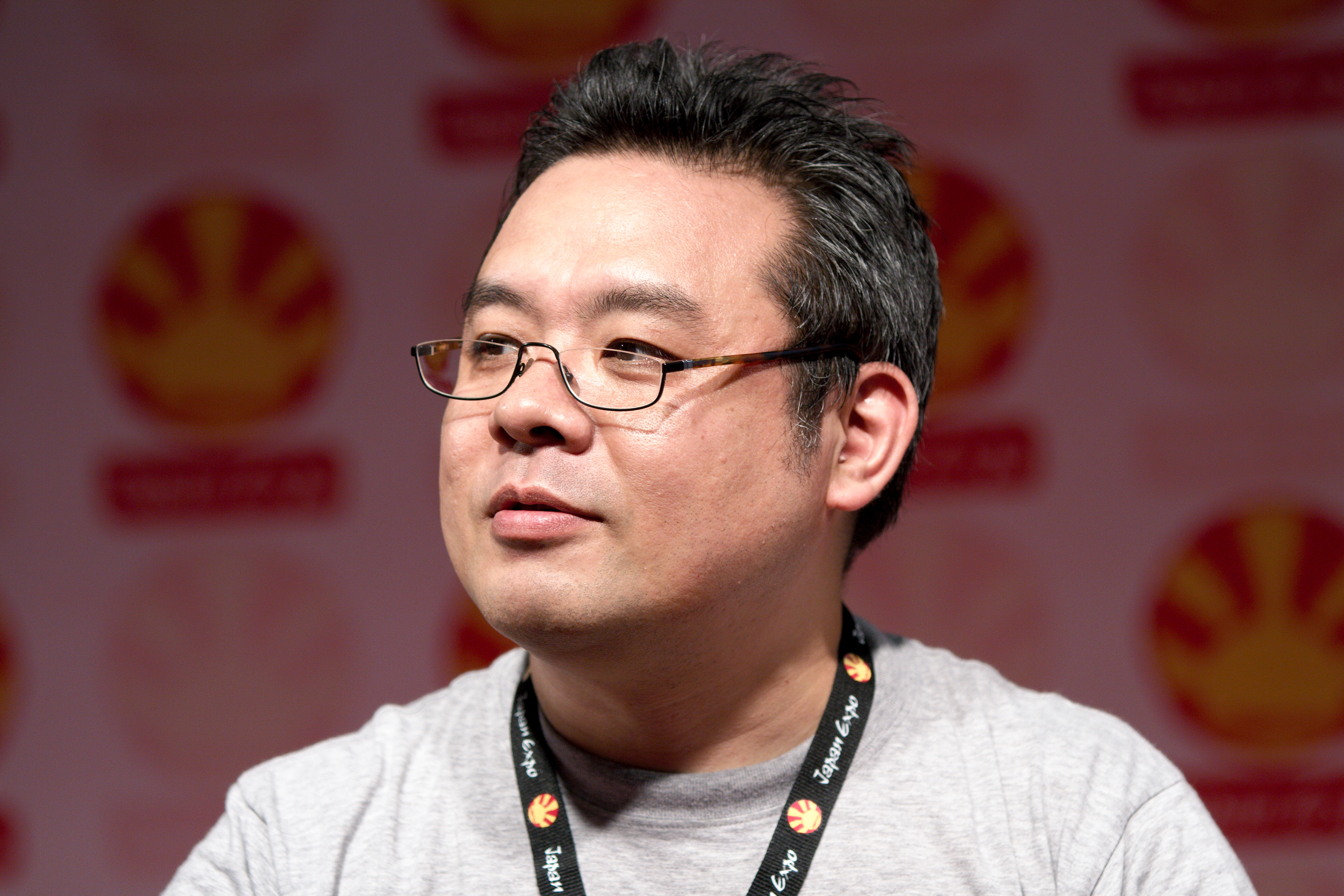
Yasuhiro Nightow, writer and illustrator of Trigun

After leaving college, Yasuhiro Nightow worked selling apartments for the housing corporation Sekisui House, but struggled to keep up with his manga drawing hobby. Reassured by some successes, including a serialized manga based on the popular video game franchise Samurai Spirits for Family Computer Magazine, he quit his job to draw full-time. With the help of a publisher friend, Nightow published a one-shot of Trigun in Tokuma Shoten's shōnen manga magazine Monthly Shōnen Captain on January 26, 1995; this eventually led to the creation of a serialized work. (Note: The one-shot was released in the March 1995 issue (cover date), released on January 26, 1995.)

The series was conceptualized as a mix of the Western and science fiction genres, as Nightow realized it was a previously unseen combination of genres in Japan. To distinguish Vash from the typical heroes in action films, Nightow portrayed him as a pacifist since he did not want his lead character to be a murderer. As such, throughout the story, Vash avoids killing enemies by disarming them and avoids inflicting mortal wounds during combat. His cheerful personality was used to highlight this trait. The title Trigun originated from Vash's multiple weapons he uses in combat including his normal gun, the prosthetic, and the supernatural Angel Arm. Other elements of the manga were based on real life. For example, Wolfwood's name was taken from the lead singer as his image for the priest. He is also modeled on Tortoise Matsumoto from the band Ulfuls. In order to create "warm" environments, Nightow drew several eating scenes.

To make Vash's appearance distinctive, Nightow often changed the character's hair color throughout the serialization. Fans questioned if this was relevant to the story; Nightow chose not to reveal his reason for it. In the series' climax, it is revealed that Vash's blond hair turning black is a secondary effect of overusing his supernatural powers. Despite his efforts in the designs, Nightow regrets giving Vash and antagonist Legato Bluesummers detailed eyes because he drew them inconsistently in the manga. In addition, Nightow had trouble designing Vash's gun as he aimed for it to look visually attractive and effective to use. He originally wanted to create a gun with unlimited bullets; he replaced it with a traditional one after consulting a picture of an upside-down barrel for inspiration. Besides Vash's guns, Nightow portrayed him as having a supernatural power known as Angel Arms, where his arms mutate to form a weapon. The Angel Arms adopt a feminine form and can create or give birth to matter.

As Nightow was making the manga, he attempted to draw the fight scenes carefully as he imagined characters moving and posing in the ways he thought, but with difficulty. In regards to the narrative, Nightow used a "logical and intuitive manner" as his modus operandi to allow readers to follow it.

== Media ==
=== Manga ===
First tankōbon volume cover of Trigun Maximum

Written and illustrated by Yasuhiro Nightow, Trigun started its serialization in Tokuma Shoten's shōnen manga magazine Monthly Shōnen Captain on March 25, 1995. (Note: It started in the May 1995 issue (cover date), released on March 25.) Monthly Shōnen Captain ceased publication on December 26, 1996, (Note: The magazine finished with its February 1997 issue (cover date), released on December 26, 1996.) and the series was put on hiatus. Tokuma Shoten collected the Trigun chapters in three tankōbon volumes released from April 25, 1996, to January 20, 1999; Shōnen Gahōsha republished the Trigun chapters in two volumes released on June 2, 2000.

When Nightow was approached by Shōnen Gahōsha's seinen manga magazine Young King OURs, they were interested in him beginning a new work. Nightow, however, was troubled by the idea of leaving Trigun incomplete, and requested to be allowed to finish the series. The manga resumed its publication in the magazine, under the title Trigun Maximum (トライガンマキシマム, Toraigan Makishimamu), in the October 1997 issue. Nightow said that there was no difference in the story between the two titles, and that the reason for the change was because of the switch of publishing house. Trigun Maximum finished in March 2007. Shōnen Gahōsha collected its chapters in fourteen tankōbon volumes released from May 23, 1998, to February 27, 2008.

In North America, the manga was licensed for an English release by Dark Horse Comics, which announced its publication in June 2003; it released the two volumes of Trigun, based on Shōnen Gahosha's edition and translated by Justin Burns, on October 15, 2003, and January 7, 2004. In March 2004, Dark Horse Comics announced that it would also publish Trigun Maximum; the fourteen volumes were released from May 26, 2004, to April 8, 2009. In September 2012, Dark Horse Comics announced that it would release the series in an omnibus edition. Trigun was released in a single omnibus volume on October 9, 2013, and Trigun Maximum was released in five volumes from November 21, 2012, to November 5, 2014.

An anthology manga titled Trigun: Multiple Bullets, featuring short stories written by manga artists such as Boichi, Masakazu Ishiguru, Satoshi Mizukami, Ark Performance, Yusuke Takeyama, Yuga Takauchi, and Akira Sagami, was released by Shōnen Gahosha in Japan on December 28, 2011. The volume was released by Dark Horse Comics on March 6, 2013.

In May 2023, Dark Horse Comics announced deluxe hardcover editions of Trigun and Trigun Maximum. The volume collecting Trigun was released on September 10, 2024, and the five volumes collecting Trigun Maximum were released from October 8, 2024, to June 17, 2025.

=== Anime ===
==== 1998 series ====
Trigun was adapted into an anime television series animated by Madhouse, with direction by Satoshi Nishimura, writing by Yōsuke Kuroda, and production by Shigeru Kitayama. The music was composed by Tsuneo Imahori. The 26-episode series aired on TV Tokyo from April 2 to October 1, 1998.

==== Film ====
A Trigun film was originally announced in February 2008 to be released in 2009. The film, titled Trigun: Badlands Rumble, opened in theaters in Japan on April 24, 2010, and was first shown to an American audience at the Sakura-Con 2010 in Seattle, Washington on April 2, 2010. At Anime Expo 2010, Funimation announced that it had licensed the film and planned to release it in theaters. The film made its US television premiere on Saturday, December 28, 2013, on Adult Swim's Toonami block.

==== Trigun Stampede ====
A second anime television series adaptation, animated by Orange and titled Trigun Stampede, aired from January 7 to March 25, 2023, on TV Tokyo and other networks. A sequel, titled Trigun Stargaze, was broadcast from January 10 to March 28, 2026.

=== Novel ===
In November 2026, it was announced that Nightow and Trigun Stampede writer Takehiko Oxi would write a novel titled Trigun Manuscript, set for release in Q4 2026.

== Reception ==
Trigun Maximum won the Best Comic category at the 40th Seiun Awards in the 48th Japan Science Fiction Convention in 2009. In October 2003, the manga's first volume by Digital Manga Publishing and Dark Horse Comics sold 30,000 units upon release in English regions, leading to a reprint of 15,000 copies. The second volume concluded the original series early the next year, and went on to be the top-earning manga release of 2004. The series has sold 5 million copies.

=== Critical response ===
Critical response to the manga has been positive. Hannah King of Manga Life praised the setting, likening it to the American Midwest of the 1800s, and described the protagonist's characterization as "fantastic" due to the personality he displayed when refusing to kill enemies. Jason Thompson of Anime News Network compared the series to Rurouni Kenshin, based on both series' pacifist themes and the challenges they posed to those themes, which he felt were explored similarly to those of the comic book hero Batman. He also commended the handling of the fight scenes and the character designs of the villains. Vash's characterization drew parallels with Thorfinn from Vinland Saga, created by Makoto Yukimura, and Van from Gun Sword. Kouta Hirano noted that Alucard's design in Hellsing drew comparisons to Vash, which led him to regret having added sunglasses.

However, Eduardo Chavez of Mania Entertainment felt that some events involving Vash became repetitive, as his pacifism frequently backfired and the narrative lacked a clear resolution. As Vash's philosophy was tested in the finale, Fandom Post praised the consequences of his actions. Knives' characterization was praised by Escapist Magazine as a strong villain, largely due to how his personality contrasted with Vash's. Mania referred to their final fight as "the stuff of legend." Regarding the Gung-ho Guns group, Anime News Network and Anime UK News claimed that the original manga explored these villains in greater depth, even if at times they received excessive screen time.

Conversely, the book Manga: The Complete Guide criticized parts of the narrative as difficult to follow, but enjoyable overall. Anime News Network also found the artwork hard to discern, noting that dialogue balloons were sometimes difficult to distinguish, and lamented that Milly and Meryl did not have major roles in the manga compared with the adaptations. Nevertheless, Mania felt that Nightow was skilled at drawing fight scenes in the finale; and Manga Life praised the art, particularly the detailed outfit Vash wore, which contrasted with the manga's setting. Manga Life also praised the execution and artwork of the clash between Vash and the antagonist.

=== Themes ===
Álvarez Salas of the University of Lima drew a comparison between the series and Rurouni Kenshin, noting that both works establish similar conflicts in how the main characters encounter opponents and seek to resolve them. In "What boys will be: A study of shonen manga", Trigun was described as an outstanding manga within the demographic for blending Wild West stories with science fiction and portraying Vash as a misunderstood hero. Despite multiple characters seeking his death, he was aided by Meryl and Milly, who chased him throughout the series, with the former showing appreciation for the protagonist. The same study also praised the manga for its thematic depth and its naming conventions, which provided hints about the relationship between Vash and Knives.

Elena M. Aponte of Bowling Green State University argued that Vash was responsible for causing major chaos with his Angel Arm, which she compared to the nuclear bomb used to end World War II. Vash's commitment to protecting others regardless of danger was challenged by Wolfwood, and it was at the manga's climax that Vash used violence for the first time in his life, killing a person to protect Livio from Legato. Aponte added that Wolfwood's characterization served to contrast Vash's values, a dynamic made evident when Wolfwood killed one of Knives' men confronting him and claimed that Vash's desire to save others was incoherent without the willingness to commit violence.
