= Nicholas D. Wolfwood =

Fictional character from Trigun

- Trigun character
- First appearance: Chapter 18: "Demon Squad" (November 30, 1996)
- Created by: Yasuhiro Nightow
- Voiced by: Japanese; Shō Hayami; Yoshimasa Hosoya (Trigun Stampede); English; Jeff Nimoy; Brad Hawkins (Trigun: Badlands Rumble); David Matranga (Trigun Stampede)

Nicholas D. Wolfwood (Japanese: ニコラス・D・ウルフウッド, Hepburn: Nikorasu Dī Urufūddo), also known as Nicholas the Punisher, is a major character in the Trigun manga series created by Yasuhiro Nightow, as well as its anime adaptation. He is a priest who wields a large cross-shaped gun named the Punisher, which he and his former colleagues use either in saving people or for complete destruction. After showing potential in the orphanage in which he was raised, Chapel trained and modified him, giving him enhanced abilities and the ability to regenerate from heavy injuries using special vials. He was given a special large cross-shaped gun called the Punisher, which contains two machine guns and a rocket launcher. Wolfwood is found nearly dead in the desert by protagonist Vash the Stampede. They become recurring allies despite acting on different morals when fighting.

Wolfwood was created by Nightow using as a major model the singer Tortoise Matsumoto from the band Ulfuls. The character has been voiced by several actors in both Japanese and English.

Wolfwood's characterization was praised for his portrayal that acts as a foil to the protagonist's morals and backstory related with the villains.

== Concept and creation ==
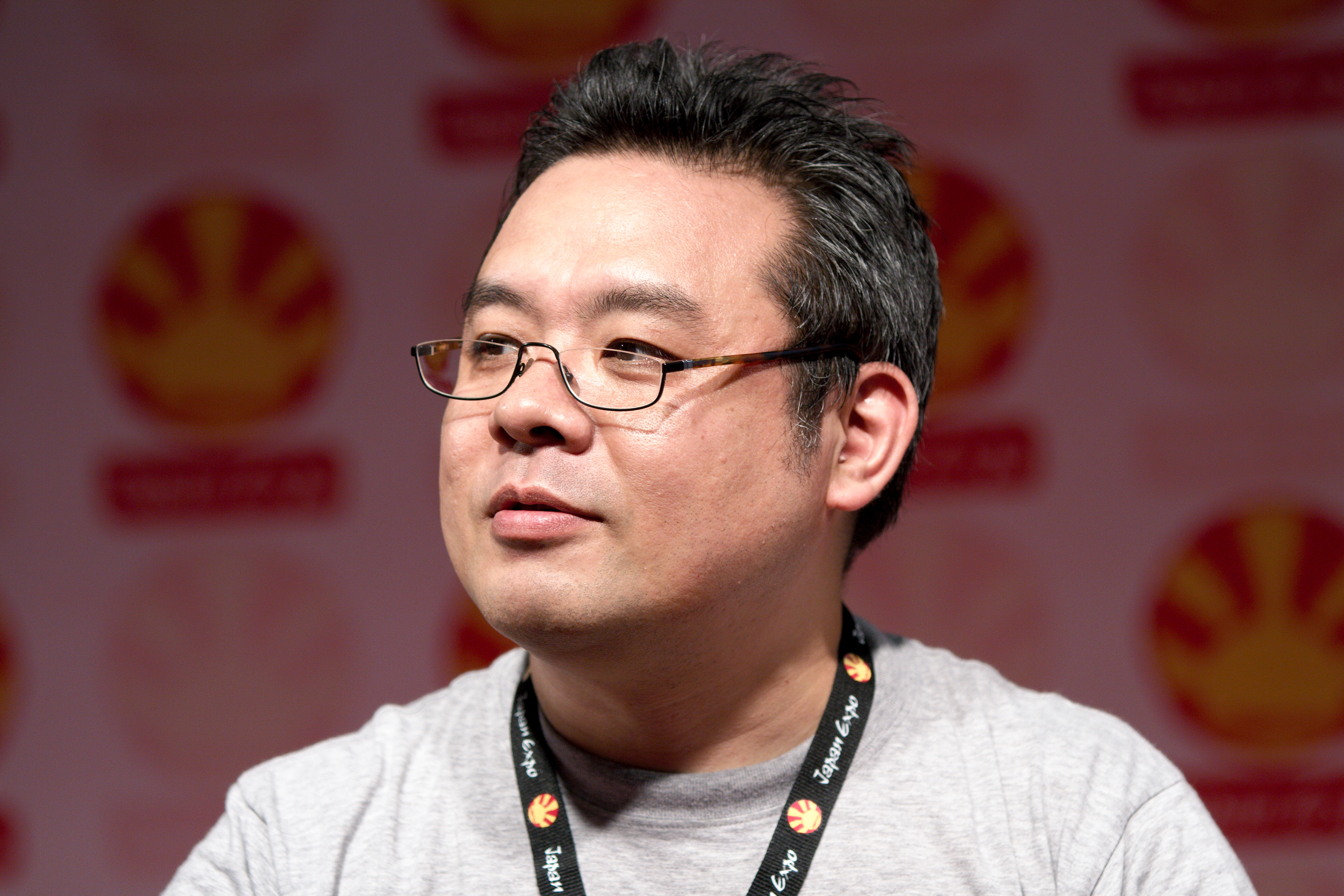
Yasuhiro Nightow created Wolfwood.

Though Vash the Stampede, the protagonist of Trigun, was Yasuhiro Nightow's original creation, Wolfwood on the other hand came from an outside inspiration. There's a band named "Wolfwood," and he took the lead singer as his image for the priest. He is also modeled on Tortoise Matsumoto from the band Ulfuls. Nightow really liked the shape of his sharp, curved down nose. Nightow jokes that as some of us might have noticed, he spent a lot of time sculpting Wolfwood's nose.

Nightow noted that the project he is really proud of is Wolfwood's life and death, and the storyline around it. His outfit was made simple and Nightow prevented himself from adding a lot of stuff, commenting that if he did, he'll be hard to draw. The Punisher is a large cross-shaped gun wielded by the best members of the Eye of Michael, of which the most commonly seen member is Nicholas D. Wolfwood. His Punisher has two machine guns in front and a rocket launcher in the back. In the anime, the side arms of the cross open up to reveal storage racks for several semiautomatic pistols. Nightow commented on the Punisher being around a "hundred-and-so" kilograms and Wolfwood having an "incredible sense of balance".

=== Casting ===
In the first Trigun animated adaptation, Wolfwood was voiced by Shō Hayami. In retrospect, he cherishes his early work, claiming he felt loved, especially when interacting with Vash's actor. For Stampede he was replaced by Yoshimasa Hosoya who talked about the various layers of Wolfwood's appeal, such as the shady Kansai dialect, his tingling danger, and the various sides of emotions he expresses between dangerous or caring.

Jeff Nimoy voiced Wolfwood in the original Trigun anime though he was first cast for Vash. After failing to dub one of Vash's lines, a Japanese man asked him if he smoked cigarettes but still fit for the Wolfwood as his character smokes. This led to Nimoy being instead cast for Wolfwood. After recording for Digimon, Nimoy met director Joe Romersa for the cast of Trigun. In eleven hours, Nimoy did the recording of all of Wolfwood's lines including his death which left him tired. Nimoy was surprised by how famous he became in the next years as people were shocked to hear his voice in and feel Wolfwood's voice. As time went on, Nimoy took a liking to his work as Wolfwood and befriended Vash's actor.

For the film, Wolfwood was voiced by Brad Hawkins. He was replaced by David Matranga for the Stampede anime.

== Appearances ==
=== Manga ===
He is a priest; however, he spent the greater part of his life training to be an assassin under a priest he looked up to. He hardly ever feels any remorse for killing, especially when it's to protect the innocent. He and Vash have some minor disagreements on this matter, which is somewhat ironic due to their occupations as gunfighters. He frequently shows his frustration at an inability to live up to Vash's non-killing lifestyle, demonstrating the guilt he has for taking others’ lives, even while doing it for good purposes. He particularly looks out for kids, making sure that none ever suffer like he did, and his primary objective has always been to make money for his orphanage.

After Wolfwood showed potential in the orphanage in which he was raised, Chapel (also known as Master C) took him into the Eye of Michael, an organization of assassins founded by a plant worshipper, and trained and modified Wolfwood to be a killer. The modifications gave him enhanced abilities and the ability to regenerate from heavy injuries using special vials, but as a result caused his body to age at an accelerated rate, giving him the appearance of being middle-aged though he is a young adult by the start of the series.

His potential was recognized as exceptional, and so he was given the tenth incarnation of the organization's most powerful weapon, a special large cross-shaped gun called the Punisher, which becomes his official title within the Eye of Michael. Wolfwood later betrayed and shot Chapel, impersonating Chapel to gain entry into the Gung-Ho-Guns in an attempt to kill Millions Knives. He failed, and was instead sent by Knives to guide and protect Vash on the latter's travels to Knives's base, thus killing fellow Guns Rai-Dei the Blade and Gray the Ninelives. After Vash is taken prisoner in the Ark, Wolfwood rescues him and later departs to December to protect the orphanage from the retaliation. He battles his childhood friend, Livio the Double Fang, and his crippled master in a confrontation that spans two volumes. He manages to mortally wound Chapel and defeat both Livio and Razlo the Tri-Punisher of Death, Livio's alternate personality, but must take a fatal overdose of his regenerative vials in order to do so. Soon after the battle is over, he dies while having a last drink with Vash.

=== Anime ===
In the anime, Wolfwood is raised by an abusive guardian, whom he later shoots and kills at the age of seven. He is taken in by Chapel the Evergreen, who trains him to become his eventual successor in the Gung-Ho Guns. He meets Vash while he is stranded in the desert, and the two join forces. During the course of the series, Wolfwood develops a relationship with Milly Thompson that crosses from close friendship into romance. Wolfwood's purpose is to raise money for the children in the orphanage he runs, trying to keep other children from suffering as he did in his own childhood. He initially holds the ideals that he must kill, though he eventually comes to accept Vash's ideals. He eventually fights his master, but spares him after defeating him. Legato Bluesummers controls Chapel and forces him to shoot Wolfwood, who stumbles into a church. He spends his last moments reflecting on his life and making a final confession, then shouts, "I did not want to die this way!" Wolfwood smiles faintly as he dies leaning against his Punisher, his pose similar to the one in which Vash first found him. Vash later carries the Punisher as a way of honoring Wolfwood's memory, and uses it against Knives after hearing the priest's voice urging him to do so during the brothers' battle.

== Reception ==
Anime Source ranked Wolfwood #75th in their Top 100 Anime Characters Survey based on 19 votes. Saying that "Wolfwood is the father of all badass, gun-toting priests. He is completely unorthodox in his methods, but still dedicated to his ministry in his own absurd way. Totally respecting this guy because not everyone can mesh coolness and priesthood with such finesse." Wolfwood ranked number 10 in the 1998 Annual Anime Grand Prix for Male Character.

Mania.com listed him in 9th place in their 10 Biggest Bad Ass Anime Gunslingers, commenting that "Wearing the clothes of a priest and carrying a cross on his back Wolfwood roams the desert planet of Gunsmoke. His cross truly represents death not only in its symbolic meaning but also in the fact that it is one giant arsenal itself. It contains a machine gun function and rocket launcher as well as containing a rack of handguns in the anime. Before Wolfwood met Vash, he was a do whatever it takes individual who had no problem with dispensing lead as for his sacraments and introducing those in his way to God in a very up close manner." The site also listed him as the best supporting character in an anime series. Jian DeLeon of Complex magazine named him sixth on a list of "The 25 Most Stylish Anime Characters," labeling him "The epitome of "speak softly and carry a big stick." Anime News Network referred to Wolfwood as a foil to Vash due to how he challenges his pacifists methods while working together. DVD Talk agreed with the handling of Wolfwood, finding him to be the opposite of Vash's character, while also commenting him to be an entertaining supporting character. Shō Hayami's performance as Wolfwood's Japanese actor was also praised by DVD Talk due to appearing to have fun with his work and how he retains a cool personality when talking about him. Elena M. Aponte from Bowling Green State University wrote that Wolfwood's characterization serves to contrast Vash's values which is heavily displayed when Wolfwood kills one of Knives' men confronting him and claims that Vash's desire to save others does not make sense if he does not want to execute violence.

Anime News Network enjoyed the handling of Wolfwood in Stampede due to how more expanded are his relationships and backstory. Anime Corner acclaimed Wolfwood's backstory episode as one of the best ones in the entire season for the execution and visuals. The sci-fi novel This Is How You Lose the Time went viral as commented by Trigun Stampede Producer Yoshihiro Watanabe with the writers noting its rise of sales following comments by a user that kept parodying Wolfwood. Toussaint Egan from Polygon expressed joy in this acknowledgment as he was both a fan of El-Mohtar and Gladstone's novel and the Trigun.

=== Analysis ===
Wolfwood continually insinuates confession is part of his purpose, Wolfwood's primary occupation is being a Christian priest, and his clothes and main weapon is of Christian themes. Nightow is generally known as one of the few successful Christian manga artists. Most of the Japanese population is not Christian, but Trigun itself is full of themes and ideas that have connections to Christianity. In the show's entry in The Encyclopedia of Science Fiction says that Wolfwood is Vash's philosophical counterpoint, being prepared to kill for the greater good in contrast to Vash's pacifist idealism.

These elements of Western Christianity and Catholicism are found throughout the manga and anime. Wolfwood takes his faith greatly in mind, despite being a gunman, but unlike Vash who is much of pacifist, Wolfwood believes himself to be a realist and that violence and killing is a part of life. When questioned about these conflicting ideals by Vash, Wolfwood laments and confesses at the church altar before his death stating, "I've always chosen the right path, haven't I?" Wolfwood actions can be seen with other of his Biblical predecessors. There is John the Baptist, a non-conforming ambassador for Christ, who walked around in the wilderness, much like Wolfwood hiked through the desert. St. Peter used gratuitous violence to save Jesus, rather like Wolfwood perhaps unnecessarily shooting down Zazie the Beast to save Vash. Jesus rebuked Peter by saying, "He who lives by the sword dies by the sword". In the manga and anime that is also how Wolfwood was killed, dying beside his weapon. Samson from the Old Testament lived life wildly and violently, killing because of grudges, and carrying on outside of marriage with the two-faced Delilah. Yet God used him as a Judge for His people. Wolfwood also lives wildly and violently, yet is able to be used for good. The Book of Judges remarks about Samson's time that "in those days there was no king in Israel, but every man did that which was right in his own eyes." Sometimes seen as Wolfwood is taking that verse to heart in a lawless land. He can also be referenced to St. Paul, who traveled through unknown land to spread Christianity, just like Wolfwood travelling through a harsh planet to save his orphanage and people he came across.
