= Genki Muro =

Japanese voice actor

- 室元気
- Born: May 31, 1989 (age 37); Miyagi Prefecture, Japan
- Occupation: Voice actor
- Years active: 2010–present
- Agent: Remax

Genki Muro (室元気, Muro Genki) (born May 31, 1989) is a Japanese voice actor from Miyagi Prefecture. He is best-known for playing Magna Swing in Black Clover.

== Filmography ==
=== Television animation ===
- Inazuma Eleven GO (2011) – Hayabusa Hideki
- Log Horizon (2013) – (Taro)
- Dragonar Academy (2014) – Maximillian Russell
- Re:Zero − Starting Life in Another World (2016) – Rachins
- Black Clover (2017) – Magna Swing, Baro
- Nana Maru San Batsu (2017) – Nakazawa Touichirou
- Ninja Girl & Samurai Master Season 3 (2018) – Nagayoshi Mori
- Dr. Stone (2019) – Ganen
- Kono Oto Tomare! (2019) – Matsunaga
- Beastars (2019) – Dom, Sunaga
- The Water Magician (2025) – Nils

=== Original video animation ===
- Code Geass: Akito the Exiled (2013) – Alan Necker

=== Dubbing ===
- Smash (2012) – (Ellis Boyd) (Jaime Cepero)
