= Gungrave (disambiguation) =

Gungrave is a 2002 video game.

Gungrave may also refer to:

- Gungrave: Overdose, a 2004 video game
- Gungrave VR, a 2017 video game
- Gungrave G.O.R.E, a 2022 video game
- Gungrave (TV series), a 2003 anime television series based on the 2002 video game
- "Gungrave", a song by Erra from their 2021 self-titled album
