= Fumihiko Tachiki =

Japanese actor and narrator (born 1961)

- 立木 文彦
- Born: April 29, 1961 (age 65); Minami-Matsuura District, Nagasaki, Japan (Currently Gotō, Nagasaki, Japan)
- Status: Married
- Other names: Bun (ぶんちゃん, Bun-chan); Fūmin (ふーみん)
- Occupations: Voice actor; actor; narrator
- Years active: 1982–present
- Agent: Office Osawa
- Notable credits: Case Closed as Vodka Bleach as Kenpachi Zaraki; Neon Genesis Evangelion as Gendo Ikari; Fullmetal Alchemist Brotherhood as Sloth; Hunter x Hunter as Menthuthuyoupi; Mob Psycho 100 as Terada; Gintama as Taizo Hasegawa (Madao); One Piece as Akainu
- Website: Official profile

Fumihiko Tachiki (立木 文彦, Tachiki Fumihiko; born April 29, 1961) is a Japanese voice actor, actor, and narrator.

== Career ==
Tachiki is known for his low voice. He serves as the narrator for Pride Fighting Championships and Dream. He and Toshiyuki Morikawa formed the band "2HEARTS" in 2003. Their song, "Ever Free", served as the ending theme for Dynasty Warriors 4: Empires. Tachiki and Ami Mimatsu formed a previous band, "Takada Band". One of their works is the opening theme for Blue Seed.

In 2022, Tachiki received the Best Supporting Actor Award at the 16th Seiyu Awards.

== Filmography ==
=== Television animation ===
1990

- Be-Bop High School (Nakama, Tooru)

1991

- Anime Himitsu no Hanazono (Mr. Pitcher)

1994

- Brave Police J-Decker (Shadow Maru)

1995

- Neon Genesis Evangelion (Gendo Ikari)

1996

- Case Closed (Vodka)
- Those Who Hunt Elves (Judge)

1997

- Pokémon (Matis, Anoki)

1999

- Eden's Bowy (Vilog)
- Turn A Gundam (Muron Muron)

2000

- Hajime no Ippo (Fujiwara Yoshio)
- Inuyasha (Gamajiro, Tsukumo no Gama, Sō'unga)
- Weekly Story Land (Yakuza, Delinquent D, Kurokawa, Cameraman)

2001

- A Little Snow Fairy Sugar (Joe the crow)
- Super GALS! Kotobuki Ran Ginzō Matsuo (Taizo Kotobuki)

2002

- Ghost in the Shell: Stand Alone Complex (A criminal, episode 16)
- Pocket Monsters: Advanced Generation (Dr. Odamaki, Takeshi's Runpappa)

2003

- Ashita no Nadja (Count Harcourt)
- Fullmetal Alchemist (Middle-aged Detective in ep10)

2004

- Basilisk (Hattori Hanzo 1st (Ogen & Danjo Youngs: Hattori Hanzo 4th "Masahiro" (Ogen & Danjo Oldest)
- Gravion Zwei (President)
- Monster (Reporter in Episode 22)

2005

- Bleach (Kenpachi Zaraki)
- Naruto (Gatsu, bounty hunter in episode 159-160)

2006

- Aria the Natural (Apa-jiisan)
- Gintama (Taizo Hasegawa/MADAO, Narrator)
- Higurashi no Naku Koro ni (Tatsuyoshi Kasai)
- Zegapain (Talbot)

2007

- D.Gray-man (Narrator, Mana Walker)
- El Cazador de la Bruja (Ricardo)
- Kaiji (Narrator)
- Hidamari Sketch (Kishi's father, janitor, others)

2008

- Hidamari Sketch x365 (Narrator)

2009

- Bakemonogatari (Hitagi Senjougahara's father)
- Fullmetal Alchemist: Brotherhood (Homunculus Sloth)
- Queen's Blade (Setra)

2010

- Arakawa Under the Bridge (Billy)

2011

- Level E (Narrator)
- Nichijou (Peso, 10 Yen, and Wadōkaichin)

2012

- Campione! (Narrator)
- High School DxD (Ddraig)

2013

- Hunter × Hunter (2011) (Menthuthuyoupi)
- Tamako Market (Gohei Ōji)

2014

- Barakamon (Ikkō Sakamoto)
- Captain Earth (Bartender)
- Nisekoi (Tachibana's dad)

2015

- Blood Blockade Battlefront (Osmerald)

2016

- Big Order (Benkei Narukami)
- The Morose Mononokean (Gigigi no Oyabun)
- Cardfight!! Vanguard G: Stride Gate (Rive Shindou)
- Mob Psycho 100 (Terada)

2017

- The Idolm@ster SideM (Takashi Saito)
- Restaurant to Another World (Alphonse)
- In Another World with My Smartphone (God)
- Atelier Lydie & Suelle: The Alchemists and the Mysterious Paintings (Hagel Boldness)

2018

- March Comes in Like a Lion (Kokubu)
- Golden Kamuy (Narrator)
- Gakuen Basara (Otani Yoshitsugu)

2021

- Getter Robo Arc (McDonald)
- Resident Evil: Infinite Darkness (Jason)

2022

- Love After World Domination (Narrator)

2023

- Chibi Godzilla Raids Again (Chibi Hedorah)
- The Yuzuki Family's Four Sons (Kojirō Kirishima)

2024

- Brave Bang Bravern! (Popalchipum)
- Go! Go! Loser Ranger! (Masurao Nadeshiko)

2025

- Ameku M.D.: Doctor Detective (Ōwashi Ameku)
- Ganglion (Colonel Shadow/Jin Kageyama)

2026

- Akane-banashi (Zenshō Arakawa)

Unknown date

- Ghost Hound (Ryōya Komori)
- Gungrave (Bunji Kugashira)
- Hyakka Ryouran Samurai Girls (Narrator)
- Jushin Enbu Hero Tales (Kouchou)
- La storia della Arcana Famiglia (Mondo)
- Letter Bee (Hazel Valentine)
- Little Snow Fairy Sugar (The Elder)
- Lucky Star (over 60 extra characters)
- Mobile Suit Victory Gundam (Wattary Gilla)
- Nana (Ginpei Shiroboshi)
- Night Warriors: Darkstalkers' Revenge (Jon Talbain)
- Nogizaka Haruka no Himitsu (Gentō Nogizaka)
- One Piece (Don Krieg, Akainu)
- Ore no Imoto ga Konna ni Kawaii Wake ga Nai, (Daisuke Kosaka)
- Ouran High School Host Club (Yoshio Ootori)
- Samurai Champloo (Riki)
- Sengoku Basara: End of Judgement (Ōtani Yoshitsugu)
- Shinreigari/Ghost Hound (Ryōya Komori)
- SoltyRei (Joseph)
- Space Brothers (Jason Butler)
- Tales of Symphonia: The Animation (Kratos)
- Trigun (Minor roles)
- Trinity Blood (Václav Havel)
- Weiss Kreuz (Botan)
- Yakitate!! Japan (Kirisaki Yuuichi)
- Zan Sayonara Zetsubō Sensei (General Frost, Episode 7)

=== Theatrical animation ===
- Patlabor 2: The Movie (1993) (Buchiyama)
- Slam Dunk Movie 2: National Champions, Sakuragi Hanamichi! (1994) (Koichiro Nango)
- Crayon Shin-chan: The Storm Called: The Battle of the Warring States (2002) (Naotaka Magara Tarozaemon)
- The Girl Who Leapt Through Time (2006) (Fukushima-sensei)
- Saint Young Men (2013) (Ryuuji)
- Crayon Shin-chan: Intense Battle! Robo Dad Strikes Back (2014) (Akogidesu)
- Cyborg 009 Vs. Devilman (2015) (Professor Adams)
- Fireworks (2017) (Fireworks technician)
- Dream Animals: The Movie (2025) (Crocodile)
- Miss Kobayashi's Dragon Maid: A Lonely Dragon Wants to Be Loved (2025) (Kimun Kamui)

=== Original net animation (ONA) ===
- Tomica Heroes Jobraver: Tokusō Gattai Robo (2022) (Professor)
- Dandelion (2026) (Streaked Pork Man)

=== Video games ===
Year	Title	Role	Console	Source
1998	Crash Bandicoot 3: Warped	Tiny Tiger	PlayStation	Japanese dub
1998	Ehrgeiz	Dasher Inoba	Arcade, PlayStation, PlayStation Network	
1999	Crash Team Racing	Tiny Tiger	PlayStation	
2001	Inuyasha	Tsukumo no Gama	PlayStation	
2003	Tales of Symphonia	Kratos Aurion	GameCube, PlayStation 2, PlayStation 3, Microsoft Windows	
2005	Namco x Capcom	Arthur, Druaga	PlayStation 2	
2005	Soulcalibur III	Nightmare	PlayStation 2, Arcade	
2005	Kingdom Hearts II	Lexaeus	PlayStation 2	
2007	Kingdom Hearts Re: Chain of Memories	Lexaeus	Game Boy Advance, PlayStation 2	
2008	Tales of Symphonia: Dawn of the New World	Kratos Aurion	Wii, PlayStation 3	
2009	Kingdom Hearts 358/2 Days	Lexaeus	Nintendo DS	
2010	Kingdom Hearts Birth by Sleep	Aeleus	PlayStation Portable	
2010	Nier	Grimoire Noir	PlayStation 3, Xbox 360	
2010	Yakuza 4	Isao Katsuragi	PlayStation 3, PlayStation 4	
2010	Sonic Colors	Wisp Announcer	Wii, Nintendo DS	
2011	The Last Story	General Trista	Wii	
2011	Sonic Generations	Wisp Announcer	PlayStation 3, Xbox 360, Nintendo 3DS	
2012	Rhythm Kaito R: Kotei Napoleon no Isan	Napoleon	Nintendo 3DS, iOS	
2012	Kingdom Hearts 3D: Dream Drop Distance	Aeleus, Beagle Boys	Nintendo 3DS	
2012	Devil Summoner: Soul Hackers	Finnegan	Sega Saturn, PlayStation, Nintendo 3DS	
2013	Metal Gear Rising: Revengeance	Dolzaev	PlayStation 3, Xbox 360, Microsoft Windows, OS X, Shield Android TV	
2013	Dragon's Dogma: Dark Arisen	Asalam		
2013	Sonic Lost World	Wisp Announcer	Wii U, Nintendo 3DS	
2014	Granblue Fantasy	Vaseraga	Android, IOS	
2014	Sonic Boom: Rise of Lyric	Cliff	Wii U	
2015	Bloodborne	Father Gascoigne	PlayStation 4	
2016	Street Fighter V	Gill	PlayStation 4, Microsoft Windows, Arcade	
2016	Zero Time Dilemma	Zero	Nintendo 3DS, PlayStation Vita, Microsoft Windows, PlayStation 4, Xbox One	
2019	Team Sonic Racing	Wisp Announcer	Nintendo Switch, PlayStation 4, Xbox One	

==== Unknown date ====
- Angelique (Victor)
- Anubis: Zone of the Enders / Zone of the Enders: The 2nd Runner (Lt. Volkovo, Zakat Runners, Doctor)
- Atelier Rorona: The Alchemist of Arland (Hagel Baldness)
- Atelier Totori: The Adventurer of Arland (Hagel Baldness, Gerhard)
- Atelier Meruru: The Apprentice of Arland (Hagel Baldness)
- Bleach Wii (Zaraki Kenpachi)
- Call of Duty: Modern Warfare 3 (Overlord, Japanese dub)
- Dragon Quest (Yangus)
- Dragon Quest: Heroes (Yangus)
- Drakengard 2 (Gismor)
- Duke Nukem Forever (Duke Nukem, Japanese dub)
- Fist of the North Star: Ken's Rage (Raoh)
- Gungrave (Bunji Kugashira)
- Gungrave Overdose (Bunji Kugashira)
- Kamen Rider: Climax Heroes W (Gaia Memory)
- Kessen III (Shibata Katsuie)
- Magical Drop III (Emperor, Hermit)
- Majou Ou (Edgar Lang)
- Odin Sphere (Odin, Verdo, Wagner)
- Perfect Dark Zero (Jack Dark, Japanese dub)
- Persona 4 Arena (Announcer)
- Phantasy Star Online 2 (Zig)
- PlayStation All-Stars Battle Royale (Sweet Tooth, Japanese dub)
- Sengoku Basara: Samurai Heroes (Otani Yoshitsugu)
- School of Ragnarok (Balharades)
- Splinter Cell: Blacklist (Majid Sadiq, Japanese dub)
- Summon Night X: Tears Crown (Seitz Endorge)
- Tales of Vesperia (Kratos Aurion)
- Vampire Hunter D (Borgoff)

=== Drama CD ===
- 110 Ban wa Koi no Hajimari series 2: 110 Ban wa Amai Kodou (xxxx) (Saburou Aramaki)
- Aka no Shinmon (xxxx) (Keigo Watanabe)
- Lesson XX (xxxx) (Takoyakushi)
- Miscast series (xxxx-xx) (Masashi Kogure)
- Ouchou Haru no Yoi no Romance (xxxx) (Takuson)
- Saint Seiya (xxxx) (Taurus Aldebaran)
- Saredo Futeki na Yatsura (xxxx) (Nobuaki Kutani)

=== Tokusatsu ===
- Chōriki Sentai Ohranger (1995) (Bara Printer)
- Kamen Rider Kuuga (2000) (Narrator)
- Kamen Rider Blade (2004) (King Rouzer)
- Kamen Rider Decade (2009) (N-Gamio-Zeda)
- Kamen Rider W (2009) (Narrator, Gaia Memory)
- Kamen Rider × Kamen Rider OOO & W Featuring Skull: Movie War Core (2010) (Kamen Rider Core)
- Kamen Rider: Beyond Generations (2021) (Shocker Executive)

=== Live-action dramas ===
- Gintama 2 (2018) (Taizo "Madao" Hasegawa)

=== Live-action films ===
- Bayside Shakedown N.E.W. (2026) (Commissioner-General)

=== Music singles ===
- Momoiro Clover Z - "Z Densetsu: Owarinaki Kakumei" (xxxx) (Announcer)

=== Dubbing ===
==== Live-action ====
- Forest Whitaker
  - Panic Room (Burnham)
  - The Last King of Scotland (Idi Amin)
  - Street Kings (Captain Jackie "Jack" Wander)
  - Criminal Minds (Sam Cooper)
  - Criminal Minds: Suspect Behavior (Sam Cooper)
  - The Butler (2016 BS Japan edition) (Cecil Gaines)
  - The Last Stand (Agent John Bannister)
  - Zulu (Ali Sokhela)
  - Taken 3 (Inspector Franck Dotzler)
  - Southpaw (Titus "Tick" Wills)
  - Rogue One (Saw Gerrera)
  - Arrival (Colonel Weber)
  - How It Ends (Tom)
  - Godfather of Harlem (Ellsworth "Bumpy" Johnson)
  - Respect (C. L. Franklin)
  - Extrapolations (August Bolo)
- Tom Sizemore
  - Enemy of the State (2003 Fuji TV edition) (Boss Paulie Pintero)
  - Bringing Out the Dead (Tom Wolls)
  - Pearl Harbor (Sergeant Earl Sistern)
  - Black Hawk Down (2004 TV Tokyo edition) (LTC Danny McKnight)
  - Big Trouble (Snake Dupree)
- Shawn Roberts
  - Resident Evil: Afterlife (Albert Wesker)
  - Resident Evil: Retribution (Albert Wesker)
  - Resident Evil: The Final Chapter (Albert Wesker)
- 12 Years a Slave (Solomon Northup / Platt (Chiwetel Ejiofor))
- Apollo 13 (2003 Fuji TV edition) (Fred Haise (Bill Paxton))
- Armageddon (2002 Fuji TV edition) (Colonel Davis (Marshall Teague))
- Armageddon (2004 NTV edition) (Chick (Will Patton))
- Black Rain (Masahiro Matsumoto (Ken Takakura))
- Bob Roberts (John Alijah "Bugs" Raplin (Giancarlo Esposito))
- Born on the Fourth of July (VHS edition) (Marine Lieutenant (David Warshofsky))
- Cliffhanger (1997 NTV edition) (Ryan (Gregory Scott Cummins))
- The Dark Knight (2012 TV Asahi edition) (James Gordon (Gary Oldman))
- Die Another Day (Damian Falco (Michael Madsen))
- Digger (Fitzgerald (Robert John Burke))
- Dr. Quinn, Medicine Woman (Hank Lawson (William Shockley))
- Dragon Blade (Rat (Wang Taili))
- Dreamer (Everett Palmer (David Morse))
- Drop Zone (Ty Moncrief (Gary Busey))
- Duets (Reggie Kane (Andre Braugher))
- Dune (Glossu Rabban (Dave Bautista))
- Dune: Part Two (Glossu Rabban (Dave Bautista))
- End of Days (2001 TV Asahi edition) (Albino (Victor Varnado))
- Exit Wounds (2004 NTV edition) (Sergeant Lewis Strutt (Michael Jai White))
- Furious 7 (Jakande (Djimon Hounsou))
- Godzilla x Kong: The New Empire (Lewis (Greg Hatton))
- Gone in 60 Seconds (Donny Astricky (Chi McBride))
- Guardians of the Galaxy (Yondu Udonta (Michael Rooker))
- Guardians of the Galaxy Vol. 2 (Yondu Udonta (Michael Rooker))
- Halo: Nightfall (Aiken (Steven Waddington))
- Happy Gilmore (Shooter McGavin (Christopher McDonald))
- Hatfields & McCoys (Randolph "Randall" McCoy (Bill Paxton))
- Haywire (John Kane (Bill Paxton))
- Independence Day: Resurgence (General Joshua T. Adams (William Fichtner))
- Iron Will (Ned Dodd (August Schellenberg))
- Disney's The Kid (Kenny (Chi McBride))
- Kill Bill (Budd (Michael Madsen))
- Musa (Dae-Jung (Ahn Sung-ki))
- Lord of the Rings trilogy (Gamling (Bruce Hopkins))
- Octopus (Casper (Ravil Isyanov))
- Out of Sight (2002 NTV edition) (Buddy Bragg (Ving Rhames))
- Pulp Fiction (Jimmie (Quentin Tarantino))
- Pushing Daisies (Emerson Cod (Chi McBride))
- Ray (Joe Adams (Harry Lennix))
- Rebel Moon (General Titus (Djimon Hounsou))
- Resident Evil: Extinction (Albert Wesker (Jason O'Mara))
- Sphere (Dr. Harry Adams (Samuel L. Jackson))
- Star Trek: Deep Space Nine (Kor (John Colicos))
- The Suicide Squad (Savant (Michael Rooker))
- Ted (Guy (Patrick Warburton))
- Ted 2 (Guy (Patrick Warburton))
- The Thirteenth Floor (Detective Larry McBain (Dennis Haysbert))
- The Three Musketeers (Porthos (Ray Stevenson))
- Transformers: Dark of the Moon (Dino (Francesco Quinn))
- Turbulence (Stubbs (Brendan Gleeson))
- Ultraman: Rising (Dr. Onda (Keone Young))
- Vinyl (Richie Finestra (Bobby Cannavale))
- War (John Crawford (Jason Statham))

==== Animation ====
- The Boss Baby (Eugene Francis)
- Cars (Mack)
- Cars 2 (Mack)
- Cars 3 (Mack)
- Coco (Juan Ortodoncia)
- Finding Dory (Bill)
- The Garfield Movie (Roland)
- The Good Dinosaur (Earl)
- Kung Fu Panda 2 (Master Thundering Rhino)
- Minions: The Rise of Gru (Stronghold)
- Monsters University (Abominable Snowman)
- Onward (Fenwick)
- Planes (Harland)
- Planes: Fire & Rescue (Brodie)
- Puss in Boots (Raoul)
- Smallfoot (Stonekeeper)
- Storks (Jasper)
- Tarzan II (Kago)
- Transformers: Adventure (Megatronus)
- Trolls World Tour (Smidge)
- WALL-E (John)
- What If...? (Nick Fury, Yondu)

=== Commercials ===
- Sushiro

== Interviews ==
- Fumihiko Tachiki and Daisuke Sato Interview - 11/28/2006
- Fumihiko Tachiki and Daisuke Sato Interview - 11/29/2006
- Fumihiko Tachiki and Daisuke Sato Interview - 11/30/2006
- Fumihiko Tachiki and Daisuke Sato Interview - 12/01/2006
