= List of Naruto episodes =

Episodes of Japanese anime series

Naruto is an anime television series based on Masashi Kishimoto's manga series of the same name. It follows Naruto Uzumaki, a young ninja who seeks recognition from his peers and dreams of becoming the Hokage, the leader of the village. The series was directed by Hayato Date, and produced by Pierrot and TV Tokyo. The episodes are based on the first twenty-seven volumes in Part I of the manga, while some episodes feature original, self-contained storylines.

The 220 episodes that constitute the series were aired between October 3, 2002, and February 8, 2007, on TV Tokyo in Japan. The English version of the series was released in North America by Viz Media, and began airing on September 10, 2005, on Cartoon Network's Toonami programming block in the United States. On September 20, 2008, Cartoon Network ended its Toonami block, but the channel continued sporadically airing episodes of Naruto in the time slots originally occupied by Toonami's programming until January 31, 2009, when episode 209, the last episode to air in the United States was shown, due to the closure of Toonami Jetstream.

On March 23, 2009, Viz stated that they were still dubbing new episodes and intended to see them aired on television. Ultimately, the final eleven episodes of the series never aired in the United States, but they were collected on DVD by Viz, which was released on September 22, 2009. The remaining eleven episodes of the English version aired on YTV's Bionix programming block in Canada from October 25 to December 6, 2009. Adult Swim's relaunched Toonami block reran the first 52 episodes in a completely uncut format from December 1, 2012, to November 30, 2013. After the 52nd episode, the series was removed from the schedule rotation to make room for its successor series, Naruto: Shippuden.

== Series overview ==
Season	Episodes	Originally released	
Season	Episodes	First released	Last released
1	35	October 3, 2002	May 28, 2003
2	48	June 4, 2003	May 12, 2004
3	48	May 19, 2004	April 20, 2005
4	48	April 27, 2005	April 5, 2006
5	41	April 12, 2006	February 8, 2007

== Episodes ==
=== Season 1 (2002–03) ===
No. overall	No. in season	Title	Directed by	Written by	Animation directed by	Original release date	English air date
Prologue
1	1	"Enter: Naruto Uzumaki!"; Transliteration: "Sanjō! Uzumaki Naruto" (Japanese: 参上！うずまきナルト)	Hayato Date	Katsuyuki Sumisawa	Yuji Moriyama	October 3, 2002	September 10, 2005
2	2	"My Name Is Konohamaru!"; Transliteration: "Konohamaru da Kore!" (Japanese: 木ノ葉丸だ コレ！)	Directed by : Rion Kujo; Storyboarded by : Hitoyuki Matsui	Akatsuki Yamatoya	Yukimaro Ōtsubo	October 10, 2002	September 10, 2005
3	3	"Sasuke and Sakura: Friends or Foes?"; Transliteration: "Shukuteki!? Sasuke to Sakura" (Japanese: 宿敵!? サスケとサクラ)	Directed by : Yuki Hayashi; Storyboarded by : Hitoyuki Matsui	Satoru Nishizono	Yasuhiko Kanezuka	October 17, 2002	September 17, 2005
4	4	"Pass or Fail: Survival Test"; Transliteration: "Shiren! Sabaibaru Enshū" (Japanese: 試練！サバイバル演習)	Directed by : Kyōsuke Mikuriya; Storyboarded by : Takaaki Ishiyama	Michiko Yokote	Takako Onishi, Yukiko Ban & Takeshi Ōsaka	October 24, 2002	September 24, 2005
5	5	"You Failed! Kakashi's Final Decision"; Transliteration: "Shikkaku? Kakashi no Ketsuron" (Japanese: 失格？カカシの結論)	Yasunori Urata	Michiko Yokote	Mariko Aoki	October 31, 2002	October 1, 2005
Land of Waves Escort
6	6	"A Dangerous Mission! Journey to the Land of Waves!"; Transliteration: "Jūyō Ninmu! Nami no Kuni e Chō-shuppatsu" (Japanese: 重要任務！波の国へ超出発)	Masahiko Murata	Kou Hei Mushi	Yukiko Ban	November 7, 2002	October 8, 2005
7	7	"The Assassin of the Mist!"; Transliteration: "Kiri no Ansatsusha!" (Japanese: 霧の暗殺者！)	Directed by : Masayuki Iimura; Storyboarded by : Hitoyuki Matsui	Michiko Yokote	Naoki Aisaka	November 14, 2002	October 15, 2005
8	8	"The Oath of Pain"; Transliteration: "Itami ni Chikau Ketsui" (Japanese: 痛みに誓う決意)	Rion Kujo	Akatsuki Yamatoya	Yukimaro Ōtsubo	November 21, 2002	October 22, 2005
9	9	"Kakashi: Sharingan Warrior!"; Transliteration: "Sharingan no Kakashi" (Japanese: 写輪眼のカカシ)	Directed by : Yuki Hayashi; Storyboarded by : Toshiya Niidome	Satoru Nishizono	Yasuhiko Kanezuka	November 28, 2002	October 29, 2005
10	10	"The Forest of Chakra"; Transliteration: "Chakura no Mori" (Japanese: チャクラの森)	Directed by : Kazuyoshi Yokota; Storyboarded by : Hitoyuki Matsui	Katsuyuki Sumisawa	Atsushi Aono	December 5, 2002	November 5, 2005
11	11	"The Land Where a Hero Once Lived"; Transliteration: "Eiyū no Ita Kuni" (Japanese: 英雄のいた国)	Yasunori Urata	Akatsuki Yamatoya	Takako Onishi	December 12, 2002	November 12, 2005
12	12	"Battle on the Bridge! Zabuza Returns!"; Transliteration: "Kyōjō Kessen! Zabuza Futatabi!!" (Japanese: 橋上決戦！ザブザ再び!!)	Directed by : Masaaki Kumagai; Storyboarded by : Hitoyuki Matsui	Michiko Yokote	Yukiko Ban	December 19, 2002	November 19, 2005
13	13	"Haku's Secret Jutsu: Demonic Mirroring Ice Crystals"; Transliteration: "Haku no Hijutsu: Makyō Hyōshō" (Japanese: 白の秘術・魔鏡氷晶)	Directed by : Masayuki Iimura; Storyboarded by : Hiroki Kawashima	Satoru Nishizono	Naoki Aisaka	December 26, 2002	November 26, 2005
14	14	"The Number One Hyperactive, Knucklehead Ninja Joins the Fight!"; Transliteration: "Igaisei Nanbā Wan, Naruto Sansen!" (Japanese: 意外性No.1(ナンバー・ワン)、ナルト参戦！)	Directed by : Rion Kujo; Storyboarded by : Hitoyuki Matsui	Satoru Nishizono	Yukimaro Ōtsubo	January 9, 2003	December 3, 2005
15	15	"Zero Visibility: The Sharingan Shatters"; Transliteration: "Shikai Zero no Tatakai: Sharingan Kuzushi" (Japanese: 視界ゼロの戦い・写輪眼崩し)	Directed by : Yuki Hayashi; Storyboarded by : Hitoyuki Matsui	Satoru Nishizono	Yasuhiko Kanezuka	January 16, 2003	December 10, 2005
16	16	"The Broken Seal"; Transliteration: "Kaihō Sareta Fūin" (Japanese: 解放された封印)	Directed by : Masaaki Kumagai; Storyboarded by : Hidehito Ueda	Katsuyuki Sumisawa	Takako Onishi & Yukimaro Ōtsubo	January 23, 2003	December 17, 2005
17	17	"White Past: Hidden Ambition"; Transliteration: "Shiroi Kako: Himeta Omoi" (Japanese: 白い過去・秘めた想い)	Toshiyuki Tsuru	Michiko Yokote	Hirofumi Suzuki & Masaru Hyodo	January 30, 2003	December 31, 2005
18	18	"The Weapons Known as Shinobi"; Transliteration: "Shinobi Toiu na no Dōgu" (Japanese: 忍という名の道具)	Directed by : Yasunori Urata; Storyboarded by : Hiroki Kawashima	Akatsuki Yamatoya	Yuji Moriyama	February 6, 2003	January 7, 2006
19	19	"The Demon in the Snow"; Transliteration: "Zabuza Yuki ni Chiru..." (Japanese: ザブザ雪に散る...)	Toshiyuki Tsuru	Akatsuki Yamatoya	Hirofumi Suzuki & Masaru Hyodo	February 13, 2003	January 14, 2006
Chūnin Exams
20	20	"A New Chapter Begins: The Chūnin Exam!"; Transliteration: "Shinshō Totsunyū! Chūnin Shiken Dattebayo" (Japanese: 新章突入！中忍試験だってばよ)	Directed by : Mitsutaka Noshitani; Storyboarded by : Satoru Iriyoshi	Kou Hei Mushi	Akihiro Tsuda	February 20, 2003	January 21, 2006
21	21	"Identify Yourself: Powerful New Rivals"; Transliteration: "Nanore! Arawareta Kyōteki Tachi!!" (Japanese: 名乗れ！現れた強敵たち!!)	Directed by : Matsuo Asami; Storyboarded by : Ryō Yasumura	Katsuyuki Sumisawa	Kazuhisa Kosuge	February 27, 2003	January 28, 2006
22	22	"Chūnin Challenge: Rock Lee vs. Sasuke!"; Transliteration: "Kiai Hyaku-Nijū Pāsento Nau de Rokku na Chōsenjō!" (Japanese: 気合120%(ひゃくにじゅうパーセント) ナウでロックな挑戦状！)	Directed by : Rion Kujo; Storyboarded by : Hitoyuki Matsui	Akatsuki Yamatoya	Yukimaro Ōtsubo	March 6, 2003	February 4, 2006
23	23	"Genin Takedown! All Nine Rookies Face Off!"; Transliteration: "Kechirase Raibaru! Rūkī Nain Zenin Shūgō" (Japanese: 蹴散らせライバル！新人9人(ルーキーナイン)全員集合)	Directed by : Yuki Hayashi; Storyboarded by : Toshiya Niidome	Michiko Yokote	Yasuhiko Kanezuka	March 13, 2003	February 11, 2006
24	24	"Start Your Engines: The Chūnin Exam Begins!"; Transliteration: "Ikinari Shikkaku? Chō-nankan no Daiichi Shiken" (Japanese: いきなり失格？超難関の第一試験)	Mashu Itō	Satoru Nishizono	Takako Onishi	March 20, 2003	February 18, 2006
25	25	"The Tenth Question: All or Nothing!"; Transliteration: "Deta-toko Shōbu! Funbari Dokoro no Jū Monme" (Japanese: 出たとこ勝負！踏ん張りどころの10(じゅう)問目)	Directed by : Masaaki Kumagai; Storyboarded by : Toshiyuki Shimazu	Kou Hei Mushi	Yukiko Ban	March 27, 2003	February 25, 2006
26	26	"Special Report: Live from the Forest of Death!"; Transliteration: "Zettai Hikken! Shi no Mori Chokuzen Rupo! Konoha no Gakkyū Shinbunda Kore!" (Japanese: 絶対必見！死の森直前ルポ！木ノ葉の学級新聞だコレ！)	Hayato Date	Katsuyuki Sumisawa	Hiromi Okazaki	April 2, 2003	March 4, 2006
27	27	"The Chūnin Exam Stage 2: The Forest of Death"; Transliteration: "Daini Shiken Sutāto! Mawari wa Minna Teki Darake!" (Japanese: 第二試験スタート！周りはみんな敵だらけ！)	Directed by : Mitsutaka Noshitani; Storyboarded by : Ryō Yasumura	Akatsuki Yamatoya	Akihiro Tsuda	April 2, 2003	April 15, 2006
28	28	"Eat or Be Eaten: Panic in the Forest"; Transliteration: "Kū ka Kuwareru ka! Esa ni Natta Naruto" (Japanese: 喰うか喰われるか！エサになったナルト)	Masahiko Murata	Satoru Nishizono	Masaru Hyodo	April 9, 2003	April 15, 2006
29	29	"Naruto's Counterattack: Never Give In!"; Transliteration: "Naruto Hangeki! Nigenēndattebayo!" (Japanese: ナルト反撃！逃げねーんだってばよ！)	Directed by : Takeyuki Sadohara; Storyboarded by : Hitoyuki Matsui	Michiko Yokote	Jong Ki Choi	April 16, 2003	April 15, 2006
30	30	"The Sharingan Revived: Dragon-Flame Jutsu!"; Transliteration: "Yomigaere Sharingan! Hissatsu: Katon Ryūka no Jutsu!" (Japanese: 蘇れ写輪眼！必殺・火遁龍火の術！)	Atsushi Wakabayashi	Kou Hei Mushi	Atsushi Wakabayashi	April 23, 2003	April 22, 2006
31	31	"Bushy Brow's Pledge: Undying Love and Protection!"; Transliteration: "Gekimayu Puratonikku! Boku wa Shinu Made Anata o Mamoru!!" (Japanese: 激まゆプラトニック！僕は死ぬまでアナタを守る!!)	Directed by : Hiroshi Kimura; Storyboarded by : Yuichiro Miyake	Satoru Nishizono	Kazuhisa Kosuge	April 30, 2003	April 29, 2006
32	32	"Sakura Blossoms!"; Transliteration: "Sakura Saku! Ketsui no Ushiro Sugata" (Japanese: サクラ咲く！決意の後ろ姿)	Masahiko Murata	Michiko Yokote	Yukiko Ban	May 7, 2003	May 6, 2006
33	33	"Battle Formation: Ino–Shika–Chō!!"; Transliteration: "Muteki no Fōmēshon! Ino–Shika–Chō!!" (Japanese: 無敵のフォーメーション！いのシカチョウ!!)	Rion Kujo	Katsuyuki Sumisawa	Yukimaro Ōtsubo	May 14, 2003	May 13, 2006
34	34	"Akamaru Trembles: Gaara's Cruel Strength!"; Transliteration: "Akamaru Bikkuri! Gaara, Kyōi no Jitsuryoku" (Japanese: 赤丸ビックリ！我愛羅、驚異の実力)	Directed by : Mitsutaka Noshitani; Storyboarded by : Yasuhiro Minami	Akatsuki Yamatoya	Akihiro Tsuda	May 21, 2003	May 20, 2006
35	35	"The Scroll's Secret: No Peeking Allowed"; Transliteration: "Nozokimi Genkin! Makimono no Himitsu" (Japanese: のぞき見厳禁！巻き物の秘密)	Directed by : Masaaki Kumagai; Storyboarded by : Hidehito Ueda	Kou Hei Mushi	Yasuhiko Kanezuka	May 28, 2003	May 27, 2006

=== Season 2 (2003–04) ===
No. overall	No. in season	Title	Directed by	Written by	Animation directed by	Original release date	English air date
Chūnin Exams
36	1	"Clone vs. Clone: Mine Are Better Than Yours!"; Transliteration: "Bunshin Taiketsu! Ore ga Shuyakudattebayo!" (Japanese: 分身対決！オレが主役だってばよ！)	Yuki Hayashi	Kou Hei Mushi	Hiromi Okazaki	June 4, 2003	June 3, 2006
37	2	"Surviving the Cut! The Rookie Nine Together Again!"; Transliteration: "Daini Shiken Toppa! Seizoroi Rūkī Nain!" (Japanese: 第二試験突破！勢ぞろいルーキーナイン！)	Directed by : Takeyuki Sadohara; Storyboarded by : Hitoyuki Matsui	Akatsuki Yamatoya	Jong Ki Choi	June 11, 2003	June 10, 2006
38	3	"Narrowing the Field: Sudden Death Elimination!"; Transliteration: "Gōkakusha Nibun no Ichi!? Ikinari Shiai Dattebayo!!" (Japanese: 合格者二分の一!? イキナリ試合だってばよ!!)	Directed by : Hayato Date; Storyboarded by : Hitoyuki Matsui	Satoru Nishizono	Masaru Hyodo	June 18, 2003	June 17, 2006
39	4	"Bushy Brow's Jealousy: Lions Barrage Unleashed!"; Transliteration: "Gejimayu Jerashī! "Shishi Rendan" Tanjō!" (Japanese: ゲジまゆジェラシー！｢獅子連弾｣誕生！)	Directed by : Hiroshi Kimura; Storyboarded by : Ryō Yasumura	Akatsuki Yamatoya	Kazuhisa Kosuge	July 2, 2003	June 24, 2006
40	5	"Kakashi and Orochimaru: Face-to-Face!"; Transliteration: "Isshokusokuhatsu!! Kakashi tai Orochimaru" (Japanese: 一触即発!! カカシVS(たい)大蛇丸)	Rion Kujo	Kou Hei Mushi	Yukimaro Ōtsubo	July 9, 2003	July 1, 2006
41	6	"Kunoichi Rumble: The Rivals Get Serious!"; Transliteration: "Raibaru Gekitotsu! Otome Gokoro wa Honki Mōdo" (Japanese: ライバル激突！オトメ心は本気モード)	Directed by : Mitsutaka Noshitani; Storyboarded by : Yasuhiro Minami	Michiko Yokote	Akihiro Tsuda	July 16, 2003	July 8, 2006
42	7	"The Ultimate Battle: Cha!"; Transliteration: "Besuto Batoru wa Shānnarō!!" (Japanese: ベストバトルはしゃーんなろー!!)	Masahiko Murata	Michiko Yokote	Yukiko Ban	July 23, 2003	July 15, 2006
43	8	"Killer Kunoichi and a Shaky Shikamaru"; Transliteration: "Shikamaru Tajitaji!? Kunoichi-tachi no Atsuki Tatakai" (Japanese: シカマルタジタジ!? くの一達の熱き戦い)	Yuki Hayashi	Katsuyuki Sumisawa	Yasuhiko Kanezuka	July 30, 2003	July 15, 2006
44	9	"Akamaru Unleashed! Who's Top Dog Now?"; Transliteration: "Akamaru Sansen!! Makeinu wa Dotchida?" (Japanese: 赤丸参戦!! 負け犬はどっちだ？)	Directed by : Masaaki Kumagai; Storyboarded by : Hitoyuki Matsui	Tamotsu Mizukoshi	Hiromi Okazaki	August 6, 2003	July 22, 2006
45	10	"Surprise Attack! Naruto's Secret Weapon!"; Transliteration: "Hinata Sekimen! Kankyaku Anguri, Naruto no Oku no Te" (Japanese: ヒナタ赤面！観客あんぐり、ナルトの奥の手)	Takeyuki Sadohara	Akatsuki Yamatoya	Jong Ki Choi	August 13, 2003	July 29, 2006
46	11	"Byakugan Battle: Hinata Grows Bold!"; Transliteration: "Byakugan Kaigen!! Uchiki na Hinata no Daitan Ketsui!" (Japanese: 白眼開眼!! 内気なヒナタの大胆決意！)	Rion Kujo	Akatsuki Yamatoya	Yukimaro Ōtsubo	August 20, 2003	August 5, 2006
47	12	"A Failure Stands Tall!"; Transliteration: "Akogare no Hito no Me no Maede!!" (Japanese: 憧れの人の目の前で!!)	Directed by : Hiroshi Kimura; Storyboarded by : Ryō Yasumura	Akatsuki Yamatoya	Kazuhisa Kosuge	August 27, 2003	August 12, 2006
48	13	"Gaara vs. Rock Lee: The Power of Youth Explodes!"; Transliteration: "Gaara Funsai!! Wakasa da! Pawā da! Bakuhatsu da!" (Japanese: 我愛羅粉砕!! 若さだ！パワーだ！爆発だ！)	Toshiyuki Tsuru	Satoru Nishizono	Hirofumi Suzuki	September 3, 2003	August 19, 2006
49	14	"Lee's Hidden Strength: Forbidden Secret Jutsu!"; Transliteration: "Nekketsu Ochikobore! Tsuini Sakuretsu, Kindan no Ōgi!" (Japanese: 熱血落ちこぼれ！遂に炸裂、禁断の奥義！)	Directed by : Hayato Date; Storyboarded by : Noriyuki Nakamura	Satoru Nishizono	Yasuhiko Kanezuka	September 10, 2003	August 26, 2006
50	15	"The Fifth Gate: A Splendid Ninja Is Born"; Transliteration: "Aa Rokku Rī! Kore ga Otoko no Ikizamayo!!" (Japanese: 嗚呼ロック・リー！これが男の生き様よ!!)	Mitsutaka Noshitani	Satoru Nishizono	Akihiro Tsuda	September 17, 2003	September 2, 2006
51	16	"A Shadow in Darkness: Danger Approaches Sasuke"; Transliteration: "Yami ni Ugomeku Kage – Sasuke ni Semaru Kiki!" (Japanese: 闇にうごめく影 サスケに迫る危機！)	Yuki Hayashi	Kou Hei Mushi	Hiromi Okazaki	September 24, 2003	September 9, 2006
52	17	"Ebisu Returns: Naruto's Toughest Training Yet!"; Transliteration: "Ebisu Futatabi! Harenchi wa Watashi ga Yurushimasenzo!" (Japanese: エビス再び！ハレンチは私が許しませんぞ！)	Rion Kujo	Akatsuki Yamatoya	Yukimaro Ōtsubo	October 1, 2003	September 16, 2006
53	18	"Long Time No See: Jiraiya Returns!"; Transliteration: "Aiyashibaraku! Ero-sennin Tōjō!!" (Japanese: あいやしばらく！エロ仙人登場!!)	Directed by : Shūji Miyahara; Storyboarded by : Hayauma Ippaku	Michiko Yokote	Akira Matsushima	October 8, 2003	September 30, 2006
54	19	"The Summoning Jutsu: Wisdom of the Pervy Sage!"; Transliteration: "Ero-sennin Jikiden – Kuchiyose no Jutsu Dattebayo!!" (Japanese: エロ仙人直伝 口寄せの術だってばよ!!)	Directed by : Keiichiro Kawaguchi; Storyboarded by : Hayauma Ippaku	Katsuyuki Sumisawa	Jong Ki Choi	October 15, 2003	October 7, 2006
55	20	"A Feeling of Yearning, a Flower Full of Hope"; Transliteration: "Setsunai Omoi – Negai o Kometa Ichirin" (Japanese: 切ない思い 願いを込めた一輪)	Directed by : Hiroshi Kimura; Storyboarded by : Ryō Yasumura	Satoru Nishizono	Kazuhisa Kosuge	October 22, 2003	October 21, 2006
56	21	"Live or Die: Risk It All to Win It All!"; Transliteration: "Seika Shika!? Menkyokaiden wa Inochigake!" (Japanese: 生か死か!? 免許皆伝は命懸け！)	Directed by : Masaaki Kumagai; Storyboarded by : Toshiya Niidome	Akatsuki Yamatoya	Chikara Sakurai	October 29, 2003	October 28, 2006
57	22	"He Flies! He Jumps! He Lurks! Chief Toad Appears!"; Transliteration: "Tonda! Haneta! Mogutta! Gama Oyabun Tōjō!!" (Japanese: 飛んだ！跳ねた！潜った！ガマ親分登場!!)	Directed by : Hayato Date; Storyboarded by : Noriyuki Nakamura	Satoru Nishizono	Yasuhiko Kanezuka	November 5, 2003	November 4, 2006
58	23	"Hospital Besieged: The Evil Hand Revealed!"; Transliteration: "Shinobi Yoru Ma no Te! Nerawa-reta Byōshitsu" (Japanese: しのび寄る魔の手！狙われた病室)	Rion Kujo	Kou Hei Mushi	Yukimaro Ōtsubo	November 12, 2003	November 11, 2006
59	24	"The Final Rounds: Rush to the Battle Arena!"; Transliteration: "Mō Retsu Mō Tsui Mō Dasshu – Hansen Kaishi Dattebayo" (Japanese: モー烈モー追モーダッシュ 本選開始だってばよ)	Mitsutaka Noshitani	Yuka Miyata	Hideyuki Yoshida	November 19, 2003	November 18, 2006
60	25	"Byakugan vs. Shadow Clone Technique!"; Transliteration: "Byakugan tai Kage Bunshin! Ore wa Zettē Katsu!!" (Japanese: 白眼VS(たい)影分身！オレはぜってー勝つ!!)	Directed by : Yuki Hayashi; Storyboarded by : Shinji Satō	Michiko Yokote	Marie Tagashira & Chiyuki Tanaka	November 26, 2003	November 18, 2006
61	26	"Ultimate Defense: Zero Blind Spot!"; Transliteration: "Shikaku Zero! Mō Hitotsu no Zettai Bōgyo" (Japanese: 死角ゼロ！もうひとつの絶対防御)	Directed by : Shūji Miyahara; Storyboarded by : Hayauma Ippaku	Akatsuki Yamatoya	Akira Matsushima	December 3, 2003	November 18, 2006
62	27	"A Failure's True Power"; Transliteration: "Ochikobore no Sokojikara!" (Japanese: 落ちこぼれの底力！)	Toshiya Niidome	Akatsuki Yamatoya	Hiromi Okazaki	December 10, 2003	November 18, 2006
63	28	"Hit It or Quit It: The Final Rounds Get Complicated!"; Transliteration: "Shikkaku!? Kiken! Maedaoshi! Haranbukumi no Daihonsen!" (Japanese: 失格!? キケン！前倒し！波乱含みの大本選！)	Directed by : Hiroshi Kimura; Storyboarded by : Ryō Yasumura	Satoru Nishizono	Kazuhisa Kosuge	December 17, 2003	November 25, 2006
64	29	"Zero Motivation: The Guy with Cloud Envy!"; Transliteration: "Kumo wa ī nā... Yaru ki Zero no Otoko" (Japanese: 雲はいいなあ... やる気ゼロの男)	Directed by : Rion Kujo; Storyboarded by : Toshiya Niidome	Michiko Yokote	Yukimaro Ōtsubo	December 24, 2003	December 2, 2006
65	30	"Dancing Leaf, Squirming Sand"; Transliteration: "Gekitotsu! Konoha Mai – Suna Ugomeku Toki" (Japanese: 激突！木の葉舞い 砂うごめく瞬間(とき))	Directed by : Yoshihisa Matsumoto; Storyboarded by : Shinji Satō	Kou Hei Mushi	Jong Ki Choi	December 31, 2003	December 9, 2006
66	31	"Bushy Brow's Jutsu: Sasuke Style!"; Transliteration: "Arashi o Yobu Otoko!! Sasuke no Gejimayu-ryū Taijutsu!" (Japanese: 嵐を呼ぶ男!! サスケのゲジマユ流体術！)	Directed by : Hayato Date; Storyboarded by : Hitoyuki Matsui	Akatsuki Yamatoya	Yasuhiko Kanezuka	January 14, 2004	December 16, 2006
67	32	"Late for the Show, but Ready to Go! The Ultimate Secret Technique Is Born!"; Transliteration: "Date ni Oku-reta Wake Janai! Kyūkyoku Ōgi: Chidori Tanjō!!" (Japanese: だてに遅れたわけじゃない！究極奥義・千鳥誕生!!)	Directed by : Mitsutaka Noshitani; Storyboarded by : Shinji Satō	Akatsuki Yamatoya	Hideyuki Yoshida	January 14, 2004	December 23, 2006
Destruction of Leaf
68	33	"Zero Hour! The Destruction of Leaf Begins!"; Transliteration: ""Konoha Kuzushi" Shidō!" (Japanese: ｢木ノ葉崩し｣始動！)	Directed by : Masaaki Kumagai; Storyboarded by : Hitoyuki Matsui	Satoru Nishizono	Chikara Sakurai	January 28, 2004	January 6, 2007
69	34	"Village in Distress: A New A-Ranked Mission!"; Transliteration: "Matte Mashita! Ē-Ranku Ninmu Dattebayo!!" (Japanese: 待ってました！A(エー)ランク任務だってばよ!!)	Directed by : Shūji Miyahara; Storyboarded by : Toshiya Niidome	Kou Hei Mushi	Akira Matsushima	February 4, 2004	January 13, 2007
70	35	"A Shirker's Call to Action: A Layabout No More!"; Transliteration: "Nigegoshi Nanbā Wan – Mendokusē ga Yarukkyanē!!" (Japanese: 逃げ腰NO．1(ナンバー・ワン) めんどくせーがやるっきゃねえ!!)	Rion Kujo	Michiko Yokote	Yukimaro Ōtsubo	February 11, 2004	January 20, 2007
71	36	"An Unrivaled Match: Hokage Battle Royale!"; Transliteration: "Kokon Musō! "Hokage" Toiu Reberu no Tatakai" (Japanese: 古今無双！｢火影｣というレベルの戦い)	Atsushi Wakabayashi	Akatsuki Yamatoya	Atsushi Wakabayashi	February 18, 2004	January 27, 2007
72	37	"A Mistake from the Past: A Face Revealed!"; Transliteration: "Hokage no Ayamachi – Kamen no Shita no Sugao" (Japanese: 火影の過ち 仮面の下の素顔)	Directed by : Hiroshi Kimura; Storyboarded by : Ryō Yasumura	Kou Hei Mushi	Kazuhisa Kosuge	February 25, 2004	January 27, 2007
73	38	"Forbidden Secret Technique: Reaper Death Seal!"; Transliteration: "Kinjutsu Ōgi! "Shiki Fūjin"" (Japanese: 禁術奥義！｢屍鬼封尽｣)	Yuki Hayashi	Michiko Yokote & Yuka Miyata	Yasuhiko Kanezuka	March 3, 2004	February 3, 2007
74	39	"Astonishing Truth! Gaara's Identity Emerges!"; Transliteration: "Kyōgaku! Gaara no Shōtai" (Japanese: 驚愕！我愛羅の正体)	Toshiya Niidome	Satoru Nishizono	Masaru Hyodo	March 10, 2004	February 10, 2007
75	40	"Sasuke's Decision: Pushed to the Edge!"; Transliteration: "Genkai o Koete... Sasuke no Ketsudan!!" (Japanese: 限界を越えて... サスケの決断!!)	Directed by : Mitsutaka Noshitani; Storyboarded by : Toshiya Niidome	Akatsuki Yamatoya	Hideyuki Yoshida	March 17, 2004	February 17, 2007
76	41	"Assassin of the Moonlit Night"; Transliteration: "Tsukiyo no Ansatsusha" (Japanese: 月夜の暗殺者)	Directed by : Rion Kujo; Storyboarded by : Tetsurō Amino	Akatsuki Yamatoya	Yukimaro Ōtsubo	March 24, 2004	February 24, 2007
77	42	"Light vs. Dark: The Two Faces of Gaara"; Transliteration: "Hikari to Yami – Gaara Toiu na" (Japanese: 光と闇 我愛羅という名)	Directed by : Shūji Miyahara; Storyboarded by : Toshiya Niidome	Kou Hei Mushi	Akira Matsushima	March 31, 2004	March 3, 2007
78	43	"Naruto's Ninja Handbook"; Transliteration: "Bakuhatsu! Korezo Naruto Ninpōchō~~!!" (Japanese: 爆発！これぞナルト忍法帖～～っ!!)	Masaaki Kumagai	Satoru Nishizono	Hiromi Okazaki	April 7, 2004	March 10, 2007
79	44	"Beyond the Limit of Darkness and Light"; Transliteration: "Rimitto Bucchigiri! "Hikari to Yami"" (Japanese: リミットぶっちぎり！～光と闇～)	Directed by : Hiroshi Kimura; Storyboarded by : Ryō Yasumura	Satoru Nishizono	Kazuya Saitō	April 14, 2004	March 17, 2007
80	45	"The Third Hokage, Forever..."; Transliteration: "Sandaime yo, Towa ni......!!" (Japanese: 三代目よ、永久に......!!)	Directed by : Akira Shimizu; Storyboarded by : Junya Koshiba	Akatsuki Yamatoya	Chikara Sakurai	April 21, 2004	March 24, 2007
Search for Tsunade
81	46	"Return of the Morning Mist"; Transliteration: "Asagiri no Kikyō" (Japanese: 朝霧の帰郷)	Yuki Hayashi	Kou Hei Mushi	Yasuhiko Kanezuka	April 28, 2004	March 31, 2007
82	47	"Eye to Eye: Sharingan vs. Sharingan!"; Transliteration: "Sharingan tai Sharingan!!" (Japanese: 写輪眼VS(たい)写輪眼!!)	Directed by : Rion Kujo; Storyboarded by : Toshiya Niidome	Yuka Miyata	Yukimaro Ōtsubo	May 5, 2004	April 7, 2007
83	48	"Jiraiya: Naruto's Potential Disaster!"; Transliteration: "Ō, Nō~! Jiraiya no Jonan, Naruto no Sainan" (Japanese: おお、のォ～っ！自来也の女難、ナルトの災難)	Directed by : Mamoru Enomoto; Storyboarded by : Tetsurō Amino	Michiko Yokote	Hideyuki Yoshida	May 12, 2004	April 14, 2007

=== Season 3 (2004–05) ===
No. overall	No. in season	Title	Directed by	Written by	Animation directed by	Original release date	English air date
Search for Tsunade
84	1	"Roar, Chidori! Brother vs. Brother!"; Transliteration: "Unare Chidori - Hoero Sasuke!" (Japanese: 唸れ千鳥 吠えろサスケ！)	Directed by : Tsuyoshi Matsumoto; Storyboarded by : Junya Koshiba	Satoru Nishizono	Akira Matsushima	May 19, 2004	April 21, 2007
85	2	"Hate Among the Uchihas: The Last of the Clan!"; Transliteration: "Orokanaru Otōto yo - Urame, Nikume!" (Japanese: 愚かなる弟よ 恨め、憎め！)	Masahiko Murata	Akatsuki Yamatoya	Hiromi Okazaki	May 26, 2004	April 28, 2007
86	3	"A New Training Begins: I Will Be Strong!"; Transliteration: "Shūgyō Kaishi - Ore wa Zettē Tsuyoku-naru!" (Japanese: 修業開始 オレはぜってー強くなる！)	Toshiya Niidome	Kou Hei Mushi	Masaru Hyodo	June 2, 2004	May 5, 2007
87	4	"Keep on Training: Pop Goes the Water Balloon!"; Transliteration: "Konjō!!! Warero Mizufūsen!" (Japanese: 根性!!! 割れろ水風船！)	Directed by : Hiroshi Kimura; Storyboarded by : Ryō Yasumura	Michiko Yokote	Masafumi Yamamoto	June 9, 2004	May 12, 2007
88	5	"Focal Point: The Mark of the Leaf"; Transliteration: "Konoha Māku to Hitaiate" (Japanese: 木ノ葉マークと額当て)	Directed by : Rion Kujo; Storyboarded by : Hayauma Ippaku	Satoru Nishizono	Yukimaro Ōtsubo	June 16, 2004	May 19, 2007
89	6	"An Impossible Choice: The Pain Within Tsunade's Heart"; Transliteration: "Hamon" (Japanese: 波紋)	Directed by : Masaaki Kumagai; Storyboarded by : Tetsurō Amino	Akatsuki Yamatoya	Yasuhiko Kanezuka	June 23, 2004	May 26, 2007
90	7	"Unforgivable! A Total Lack of Respect!"; Transliteration: "Ikari Bakuhatsu! Yurusanēttebayo" (Japanese: 怒りバクハツ！許さねーってばよ)	Directed by : Tsuyoshi Matsumoto; Storyboarded by : Shinji Satō	Akatsuki Yamatoya	Akira Matsushima	July 7, 2004	June 9, 2007
91	8	"Inheritance! The Necklace of Death!"; Transliteration: "Shodai Hokage no Isan - Shi o Yobu Kubikazari" (Japanese: 初代火影の遺産 死を呼ぶ首飾り)	Directed by : Mitsutaka Noshitani; Storyboarded by : Junya Koshiba	Kou Hei Mushi	Hideyuki Yoshida	July 14, 2004	June 16, 2007
92	9	"A Dubious Offer! Tsunade's Choice!"; Transliteration: "Iessu ka Nō ka! Tsunade no Kaitō" (Japanese: YES(イェス)かNO(ノー)か！ツナデの回答)	Masahiko Murata	Michiko Yokote	Chikara Sakurai	July 21, 2004	June 23, 2007
93	10	"Breakdown! The Deal Is Off!"; Transliteration: "Kōshō Ketsuretsu!!" (Japanese: 交渉決裂!!)	Toshiya Niidome	Satoru Nishizono	Masaru Hyodo	July 28, 2004	June 30, 2007
94	11	"Attack! Fury of the Rasengan!"; Transliteration: "Kurae! Ikari no Rasengan" (Japanese: くらえ！怒りの螺旋丸)	Directed by : Yuki Hayashi; Storyboarded by : Hayauma Ippaku	Akatsuki Yamatoya	Yasuhiko Kanezuka	August 4, 2004	July 7, 2007
95	12	"The Fifth Hokage! A Life on the Line!"; Transliteration: "Godaime Hokage - Inochi o Kaketa Tatakai!" (Japanese: 五代目火影 命を賭けた闘い！)	Directed by : Yoshinori Odaka; Storyboarded by : Ryō Yasumura	Katsuyuki Sumisawa	Masafumi Yamamoto	August 11, 2004	July 7, 2007
96	13	"Deadlock! Sannin Showdown!"; Transliteration: "Sansukumi no Tatakai" (Japanese: 三すくみの戦い)	Directed by : Tsuyoshi Matsumoto; Storyboarded by : Toshiya Niidome	Katsuyuki Sumisawa	Akira Matsushima	August 11, 2004	July 14, 2007
97	14	"Kidnapped! Naruto's Hot Spring Adventure!"; Transliteration: "Naruto no Yukemuri Chin Dōchū" (Japanese: ナルトの湯けむり珍道中)	Directed by : Masaaki Kumagai; Storyboarded by : Junya Koshiba	Satoru Nishizono	Yukiko Ban	August 18, 2004	July 21, 2007
98	15	"Tsunade's Warning: No More Ninja!"; Transliteration: "Ninja o Yamero! Tsunade no Tsūkoku" (Japanese: 忍者を辞めろ！ツナデの通告)	Shinji Satō	Michiko Yokote	Hiromi Okazaki	August 25, 2004	July 28, 2007
99	16	"The Will of Fire Still Burns!"; Transliteration: "Hi no Ishi o Tsugu Mono" (Japanese: 火の意志を継ぐもの)	Directed by : Mitsutaka Noshitani; Storyboarded by : Toshiya Niidome	Michiko Yokote	Hideyuki Yoshida	September 1, 2004	August 4, 2007
100	17	"Sensei and Student: The Bond of the Shinobi"; Transliteration: "Nekketsu Shitei no Kizuna: Otoko ga Nindō wo Tsuranuku Toki" (Japanese: 熱血師弟の絆～男が忍道を貫くとき～)	Directed by : Rion Kujo; Storyboarded by : Toshiya Niidome	Michiko Yokote	Yukimaro Ōtsubo	September 8, 2004	August 19, 2007
Standalone side story
101	18	"Gotta See! Gotta Know! Kakashi-sensei's True Face!"; Transliteration: "Mitai, Shiritai, Tashikametai - Kakashi-sensei no Sugao" (Japanese: 見たい、知りたい、確かめたい カカシ先生の素顔)	Masahiko Murata	Akatsuki Yamatoya	Chikara Sakurai	September 15, 2004	August 25, 2007
Land of Tea Escort
102	19	"Mission: Help an Old Friend in the Land of Tea"; Transliteration: "Iza Shin Ninmu - Giri to Ninjō to Cha-kuni o Sukue!" (Japanese: いざ新任務 義理と人情と茶國を救え！)	Directed by : Tsuyoshi Matsumoto; Storyboarded by : Toshiya Niidome	Akatsuki Yamatoya & Katsuyuki Sumisawa	Akira Matsushima	September 22, 2004	September 1, 2007
103	20	"The Race Is On! Trouble on the High Seas!"; Transliteration: "Naruto Gekichin!? Inbau Uzumaku Ōunabara" (Japanese: ナルト撃沈!? 陰謀うずまく大海原)	Directed by : Yoshinori Odaka; Storyboarded by : Ryō Yasumura	Michiko Yokote, Satoru Nishizono & Katsuyuki Sumisawa	Masafumi Yamamoto	September 29, 2004	September 15, 2007
104	21	"Run Idate Run! Nagi Island Awaits!"; Transliteration: "Hashire Idate! Arashi o Yubi Haran no Nagitō!!" (Japanese: 走れイダテ！嵐を呼ぶ波乱のナギ島!!)	Yuki Hayashi	Katsuyuki Sumisawa, Akatsuki Yamatoya & Kou Hei Mushi	Seiko Asai & Yasuhiko Kanezuka	October 13, 2004	September 22, 2007
105	22	"A Fierce Battle of Rolling Thunder!"; Transliteration: "Gōru Chokuzen! Raimei Todoroku Daigekitō" (Japanese: ゴール直前！雷鳴とどろく大激闘)	Masaaki Kumagai	Akatsuki Yamatoya, Satoru Nishizono & Katsuyuki Sumisawa	Yasuhiko Kanezuka & Hiromi Okazaki	October 20, 2004	September 29, 2007
106	23	"The Last Leg: A Final Act of Desperation"; Transliteration: "Todoku ka Idate! Shūnen no Rasuto Supāto!!" (Japanese: 届くかイダテ！執念のラストスパート)	Directed by : Mitsutaka Noshitani; Storyboarded by : Hayauma Ippaku	Katsuyuki Sumisawa	Hideyuki Yoshida	October 27, 2004	October 6, 2007
Sasuke Retrieval
107	24	"The Battle Begins: Naruto vs. Sasuke"; Transliteration: "Omae to Tatakaitai! Tsui ni Gekitotsu, Sasuke tai Naruto" (Japanese: オマエと戦いたい！ついに激突、サスケVS(たい)ナルト)	Toshiya Niidome	Katsuyuki Sumisawa	Masaru Hyodo	November 3, 2004	October 13, 2007
108	25	"Bitter Rivals and Broken Bonds"; Transliteration: "Mienai Kiretsu" (Japanese: 見えない亀裂)	Directed by : Tsuyoshi Matsumoto; Storyboarded by : Hayauma Ippaku	Akatsuki Yamatoya	Akira Matsushima	November 10, 2004	October 20, 2007
109	26	"An Invitation from the Sound"; Transliteration: "Oto no Izanai" (Japanese: 音の誘い)	Shinji Satō	Michiko Yokote	Yukiko Ban	November 17, 2004	October 20, 2007
110	27	"Formation! The Sasuke Retrieval Squad"; Transliteration: "Kessei! Teppeki Fōmēshon" (Japanese: 結成！鉄壁のフォーメーション)	Masahiko Murata	Kou Hei Mushi	Chikara Sakurai	November 24, 2004	October 27, 2007
111	28	"Sound vs. Leaf"; Transliteration: "Sesshoku: Oto Yoninshū no Jitsuryoku" (Japanese: 接触～音四人衆の実力～)	Directed by : Yoshinori Odaka; Storyboarded by : Ryō Yasumura	Kou Hei Mushi	Masafumi Yamamoto	November 24, 2004	October 27, 2007
112	29	"Squad Mutiny: Everything Falls Apart!"; Transliteration: "Ikinari Nakamaware!? Shikamaru Shōtai Daipinchi" (Japanese: イキナリ仲間割れ!? シカマル小隊大ピンチ)	Yuki Hayashi	Akatsuki Yamatoya	Yasuhiko Kanezuka	December 1, 2004	November 3, 2007
113	30	"Full Throttle Power! Chōji, Ablaze!"; Transliteration: "Pawā Zenkai! Moero Chōji" (Japanese: パワー全開！燃えろチョウジ)	Directed by : Akira Shimizu; Storyboarded by : Toshiya Niidome	Satoru Nishizono	Hideyuki Yoshida	December 8, 2004	November 3, 2007
114	31	"Good-bye Old Friend...! I'll Always Believe in You!"; Transliteration: "Saraba Tomo yo...! Soredemo Ore wa Shinjiteru" (Japanese: さらば友よ…！それでもオレは信じてる)	Directed by : Masaaki Kumagai; Storyboarded by : Toshiya Niidome	Satoru Nishizono	Hiromi Okazaki	December 15, 2004	November 10, 2007
115	32	"Your Opponent Is Me!"; Transliteration: "Omae no Aite wa Kono Ore da!" (Japanese: お前の相手はこのオレだ！)	Directed by : Tsuyoshi Matsumoto; Storyboarded by : Hayauma Ippaku	Michiko Yokote	Hideki Hashimoto	December 22, 2004	November 10, 2007
116	33	"360 Degrees of Vision: The Byakugan's Blind Spot"; Transliteration: "Shikai Sanbyaku-Rokujū Do - Byakugan no Shikaku" (Japanese: 視界360(さんびゃくろくじゅう)度 白眼の死角)	Shinji Satō	Kou Hei Mushi	Yukiko Ban	January 5, 2005	November 24, 2007
117	34	"Losing Is Not an Option!"; Transliteration: "Makerare-nai Riyū" (Japanese: 負けられない理由)	Toshiya Niidome	Akatsuki Yamatoya	Masaru Hyodo	January 5, 2005	November 24, 2007
118	35	"The Vessel Arrives Too Late"; Transliteration: "Dakkan - Ma ni Awanakatta Utsuwa" (Japanese: 奪還～間に合わなかった器)	Directed by : Yuki Hayashi; Storyboarded by : Ryō Yasumura	Katsuyuki Sumisawa	Yasuhiko Kanezuka	January 12, 2005	December 1, 2007
119	36	"Miscalculation: A New Enemy Appears!"; Transliteration: "Shissaku! Arata-naru Teki" (Japanese: 失策！新たなる敵)	Directed by : Akira Shimizu; Storyboarded by : Hayauma Ippaku	Katsuyuki Sumisawa	Hideyuki Yoshida	January 19, 2005	December 1, 2007
120	37	"Roar and Howl! The Ultimate Tag-Team!"; Transliteration: "Unare! Hoero! Kyūkyoku no Taggu" (Japanese: 唸れ！吼えろ！究極のタッグ)	Masahiko Murata	Katsuyuki Sumisawa	Chikara Sakurai	February 2, 2005	December 8, 2007
121	38	"To Each His Own Battle"; Transliteration: "Sorezore no Tatakai" (Japanese: それぞれの闘い)	Directed by : Tsuyoshi Matsumoto; Storyboarded by : Hayauma Ippaku	Akatsuki Yamatoya	Hideki Hashimoto	February 9, 2005	December 8, 2007
122	39	"Fakeout: Shikamaru's Comeback!"; Transliteration: "Feiku! Otoko Shikamaru - Kishikaisei no Kake" (Japanese: フェイク！男シカマル 起死回生の賭け)	Directed by : Akira Shimizu; Storyboarded by : Hitoyuki Matsui	Michiko Yokote	Hiromi Okazaki	February 16, 2005	December 15, 2007
123	40	"The Leaf's Handsome Devil!"; Transliteration: "Konoha no Aoki Yajū Kenzan!" (Japanese: 木ノ葉の碧き野獣 見参！)	Masaaki Kumagai	Kou Hei Mushi	Yasuhiko Kanezuka	February 23, 2005	December 15, 2007
124	41	"The Beast Within"; Transliteration: "Yajū Sakuretsu! Hajikero Futtobe Tsukinukero!" (Japanese: 野獣炸裂！弾けろ吹っ飛べ突き抜けろ！)	Directed by : Shinji Satō; Storyboarded by : Toshiya Niidome	Satoru Nishizono	Yukiko Ban	March 2, 2005	December 22, 2007
125	42	"The Sand Shinobi: Allies of the Leaf"; Transliteration: "Konoha Dōmei-kuni - Suna no Shinobi" (Japanese: 木ノ葉同盟国 砂の忍)	Directed by : Yuki Hayashi; Storyboarded by : Hitoyuki Matsui	Akatsuki Yamatoya	Hideyuki Yoshida	March 9, 2005	December 22, 2007
126	43	"Showdown: Gaara vs. Kimimaro!"; Transliteration: "Saikyō Taiketsu! Gaara tai Kimimaro!!" (Japanese: 最強対決！我愛羅VS(たい)君麻呂!!)	Toshiya Niidome	Katsuyuki Sumisawa	Masaru Hyodo	March 16, 2005	December 29, 2007
127	44	"Vengeful Strike! The Bracken Dance!"; Transliteration: "Shūnen no Ichigeki! Sawarabi no Mai" (Japanese: 執念の一撃！早蕨の舞)	Shigenori Kageyama	Katsuyuki Sumisawa	Kwang Seok Yang	March 30, 2005	December 29, 2007
128	45	"A Cry on Deaf Ears"; Transliteration: "Todokanai Sakebi" (Japanese: 届かない叫び)	Tsuyoshi Matsumoto	Katsuyuki Sumisawa	Haruo Sotozaki	March 30, 2005	January 5, 2008
129	46	"Brothers: Distance Among the Uchiha"; Transliteration: "Ani Itachi to Otōto Sasuke - Tōsugiru Sonzai" (Japanese: 兄(イタチ)と弟(サスケ) 遠すぎる存在)	Masahiko Murata	Katsuyuki Sumisawa	Chikara Sakurai & Seiko Asai	April 6, 2005	January 5, 2008
130	47	"Father and Son, the Broken Crest"; Transliteration: "Chichi to Ko - Hibiwa-reta Kamon" (Japanese: 父と子 ひび割れた家紋)	Directed by : Akira Shimizu; Storyboarded by : Toshiya Niidome	Katsuyuki Sumisawa	Hiromi Okazaki	April 13, 2005	January 12, 2008
131	48	"The Secrets of the Mangekyō Sharingan"; Transliteration: "Kaigan - Mangekyō Sharingan no Himitsu" (Japanese: 開眼 万華鏡写輪眼の秘密)	Directed by : Masaaki Kumagai; Storyboarded by : Toshiya Niidome	Katsuyuki Sumisawa	Yasuhiko Kanezuka	April 20, 2005	January 12, 2008

=== Season 4 (2005–06) ===
No. overall	No. in season	Title	Directed by	Written by	Animation directed by	Original release date	English air date
Sasuke Retrieval
132	1	"For a Friend..."; Transliteration: "Tomo yo!" (Japanese: 親友(とも)よ！)	Shinji Satō	Katsuyuki Sumisawa	Yukiko Ban	April 27, 2005	January 19, 2008
133	2	"A Plea from a Friend"; Transliteration: "Namida no Hōkō! Omae wa Ore no Tomodachi da" (Japanese: 涙の咆哮！オマエはオレの友達だ)	Atsushi Wakabayashi	Katsuyuki Sumisawa	Atsushi Wakabayashi	May 4, 2005	January 19, 2008
134	3	"The End of Tears"; Transliteration: "Namida Ame no Ketsumatsu" (Japanese: 涙雨の結末)	Directed by : Yasuyuki Honda; Storyboarded by : Shinji Satō	Katsuyuki Sumisawa	Kenichiro Ogata	May 11, 2005	January 26, 2008
135	4	"The Promise That Could Not Be Kept"; Transliteration: "Mamorenakatta Yakusoku" (Japanese: 守れなかった約束)	Toshiya Niidome	Katsuyuki Sumisawa	Masaru Hyodo	May 18, 2005	January 26, 2008
Land of Rice Fields Investigation
136	5	"Deep Cover?! A Super S-Ranked Mission!"; Transliteration: "Sennyū Sōsa!? Tsui ni Kitakita Chō Esu-Kyū Ninmu" (Japanese: 潜入捜査!? 遂にきたきた超S(エス)級任務)	Shigenori Kageyama	Junki Takegami	Kwang Seok Yang	May 25, 2005	February 2, 2008
137	6	"A Town of Outlaws, the Shadow of the Fūma Clan"; Transliteration: "Muhōmono no Machi - Fūma Ichizoku no Kage" (Japanese: 無法者の街 ふうま一族の影)	Directed by : Yuki Hayashi; Storyboarded by : Shinji Satō	Junki Takegami	Yasuhiko Kanezuka	June 1, 2005	February 2, 2008
138	7	"Pure Betrayal and a Fleeting Plea"; Transliteration: "Kiyoki Uragiri - Hakanaki Negai" (Japanese: 清き裏切り はかなき願い)	Directed by : Masaaki Kumagai; Storyboarded by : Toshiya Niidome	Junki Takegami	Hiromi Okazaki	June 8, 2005	February 9, 2008
139	8	"Pure Terror! The House of Orochimaru!"; Transliteration: "Kyōfu! Orochimaru no Yakata" (Japanese: 恐怖！大蛇丸の館)	Masahiko Murata	Junki Takegami	Seiko Asai	June 15, 2005	February 9, 2008
140	9	"Two Heartbeats: Kabuto's Trap"; Transliteration: "Futatsu no Kodō - Kabuto no Wana" (Japanese: 二つの鼓動 カブトの罠)	Directed by : Yasuyuki Honda; Storyboarded by : Yasuaki Kurotsu	Junki Takegami	Kenichiro Ogata	June 22, 2005	February 16, 2008
141	10	"Sakura's Determination!"; Transliteration: "Sakura no Ketsui" (Japanese: サクラの決意)	Shinji Satō	Junki Takegami	Yukiko Ban	June 29, 2005	February 16, 2008
Mizuki Tracking
142	11	"The Three Villains from the Maximum Security Prison"; Transliteration: "Genkai Shisetsu no San Akunin" (Japanese: 厳戒施設の三悪人)	Shigenori Kageyama	Kou Hei Mushi	Kwang Seok Yang	July 6, 2005	February 23, 2008
143	12	"Tonton! I'm Counting on You!"; Transliteration: "Hashire Tonton! Omae no Hana ga Tayori Dattebayo" (Japanese: 走れトントン！お前の鼻が頼りだってばよ)	Directed by : Yuki Hayashi; Storyboarded by : Toshiya Niidome	Kou Hei Mushi	Yasuhiko Kanezuka	July 13, 2005	February 23, 2008
144	13	"A New Squad! Two People and a Dog?!"; Transliteration: "Shin'sei Surī-Man Seru - Futari to Ippiki!" (Japanese: 新生三人一組(スリーマンセル) 二人と一匹！)	Masaaki Kumagai	Kou Hei Mushi	Hiromi Okazaki	July 20, 2005	March 1, 2008
145	14	"A New Formation: Ino–Shika–Chō!"; Transliteration: "Sakuretsu! Nyū Fōmēshon Ino–Shika–Chō" (Japanese: 炸裂！ニューフォーメーションいのシカチョウ)	Directed by : Hayato Goda; Storyboarded by : Toshiya Niidome	Kou Hei Mushi	Kenichiro Ogata	July 27, 2005	March 1, 2008
146	15	"Remaining Ambition: Orochimaru's Shadow"; Transliteration: "Nokosa-reta Yabō - Orochimaru no Kage" (Japanese: 残された野望 大蛇丸の影)	Masahiko Murata	Yuka Miyata	Seiko Asai	August 10, 2005	March 8, 2008
147	16	"A Clash of Fate: You Can't Bring Me Down!"; Transliteration: "In'nen no Taiketsu! Omae ni Ore wa Taosenee" (Japanese: 因縁の対決！オマエにオレは倒せねえ)	Directed by : Tsuyoshi Matsumoto; Storyboarded by : Tsubute Hyakuno	Yuka Miyata	Yukiko Ban	August 17, 2005	March 8, 2008
Bikōchū Search
148	17	"The Search for the Rare Bikōchū Beetle"; Transliteration: "Chō Tsuibiryoku ni Akamaru mo Shitto! Maboroshi no Bikōchū o Sagase" (Japanese: 超追尾力に赤丸も嫉妬！幻の微香虫を探せ)	Chiyuki Tanaka	Satoru Nishizono	Yasuhiko Kanezuka	August 17, 2005	March 15, 2008
149	18	"What's the Difference? Don't All Insects Look Alike?"; Transliteration: "Doko ga Chigau no Sa!? Mushitte Onaji Mienaika" (Japanese: どこが違うのさ!? 虫って同じに見えないか)	Shigenori Kageyama	Satoru Nishizono	Jin Gu Kim	August 24, 2005	March 15, 2008
150	19	"A Battle of Bugs! The Deceivers and the Deceived!"; Transliteration: "Damashite Bakashite Damasarete! Sōzetsu Mushimushi Dai Batoru" (Japanese: だまして化かしてだまされて！壮絶ムシムシ大バトル)	Toshiya Niidome	Satoru Nishizono	Masaru Hyodo	August 31, 2005	March 22, 2008
151	20	"Blaze Away, Byakugan! This Is My Ninja Way!"; Transliteration: "Moe yo Byakugan! Kore ga Watashi no Nindō yo" (Japanese: 燃えよ白眼！これが私の忍道よ)	Toshiyuki Tsuru	Satoru Nishizono	Hirofumi Suzuki	September 14, 2005	March 22, 2008
Kurosuki Family Removal
152	21	"Funeral March for the Living"; Transliteration: "Sei Aru Mono e no Sōsōkyoku" (Japanese: 生あるものへの葬送曲)	Directed by : Hayato Goda; Storyboarded by : Shinji Satō	Yasuyuki Suzuki	Kenichiro Ogata	September 21, 2005	March 29, 2008
153	22	"A Lesson Learned: The Iron Fist of Love!"; Transliteration: "Kokoro no Todoke! Ai no Tekken" (Japanese: 心に届け！愛の鉄拳)	Directed by : Masaaki Kumagai; Storyboarded by : Tsubute Hyakuno	Junki Takegami	Hiromi Okazaki	September 28, 2005	March 29, 2008
154	23	"The Enemy of the Byakugan"; Transliteration: "Byakugan no Tenteki" (Japanese: 白眼の天敵)	Directed by : Yuki Hayashi; Storyboarded by : Toshiya Niidome	Yasuyuki Suzuki	Zenjirō Ukulele	October 5, 2005	April 5, 2008
155	24	"The Dark Creeping Clouds"; Transliteration: "Shinobi Yoru An'un" (Japanese: 忍び寄る暗雲)	Shigenori Kageyama	Junki Takegami	Jin Gu Kim & Ik Hyun Eum	October 12, 2005	April 5, 2008
156	25	"Raiga's Counterattack"; Transliteration: "Gyakushū no Raiga" (Japanese: 逆襲の雷牙)	Directed by : Hayato Goda; Storyboarded by : Shinji Satō	Yasuyuki Suzuki	Zenjirō Ukulele	October 19, 2005	April 12, 2008
157	26	"Run! The Curry of Life!"; Transliteration: "Hashire!!! Inochi no Karē" (Japanese: 走れ!!! 生命(いのち)のカレー)	Masahiko Murata	Junki Takegami	Seiko Asai	October 26, 2005	April 12, 2008
Standalone side story
158	27	"Follow My Lead! The Great Survival Challenge"; Transliteration: "Minna Ore ni Tsuite Koi! Ase to Namida no Takurami Dai Sabaibaru" (Japanese: みんなオレについて来い！汗と涙のタクラミ大サバイバル)	Directed by : Tsuyoshi Matsumoto; Storyboarded by : Toshiya Niidome	Kou Hei Mushi	Hidehiko Okano & Takenori Tsukuma	November 2, 2005	April 19, 2008
Gosunkugi Capture
159	28	"The Bounty Hunter from the Wilderness"; Transliteration: "Teki ka Mikata ka!? Kōya no Shōkin Kasegi" (Japanese: 敵か味方か!? 荒野の賞金稼ぎ)	Directed by : Masaaki Kumagai; Storyboarded by : Tsubute Hyakuno	Yasuyuki Suzuki	Hiromi Okazaki	November 9, 2005	April 19, 2008
160	29	"Hunt or Be Hunted?! Showdown at the O.K. Temple!"; Transliteration: "Eru ka Erareru ka!? Okkē Tera no Kettō" (Japanese: 獲るか獲られるか!? オッケー寺の決斗)	Directed by : Yuki Hayashi; Storyboarded by : Toshiya Niidome	Yasuyuki Suzuki	Zenjirō Ukulele	November 16, 2005	April 26, 2008
Standalone side story
161	30	"The Appearance of Strange Visitors"; Transliteration: "Chinkyaku Kenzan - Ao no Yajū? Mōjū? ...Chinjū?" (Japanese: 珍客見参 碧の野獣？猛獣？…珍獣？)	Directed by : Hayato Goda; Storyboarded by : Chiyuki Tanaka	Yasuyuki Suzuki	Akihiro Tsuda & Shinmei Saito	November 23, 2005	April 26, 2008
Cursed Warrior Extermination
162	31	"The Cursed Warrior"; Transliteration: "Shiroki Noroi Musha" (Japanese: 白き呪い武者)	Directed by : Kiyomu Fukuda; Storyboarded by : Shigenori Kageyama	Junki Takegami	Jin Gu Kim & Ik Hyun Eum	November 30, 2005	May 3, 2008
163	32	"The Tactician's Intent"; Transliteration: "Sakushi: Kōmei no Omowaku" (Japanese: 策士・紅明の思惑)	Directed by : Yoshihiro Sugai; Storyboarded by : Tsubute Hyakuno	Junki Takegami	Minoru Morita	December 7, 2005	May 3, 2008
164	33	"Too Late for Help"; Transliteration: "Ososugita Suketto" (Japanese: 遅すぎた助っ人)	Directed by : Tsuyoshi Matsumoto; Storyboarded by : Shinji Satō	Junki Takegami	Hidehiko Okano & Takenori Tsukuma	December 14, 2005	May 10, 2008
165	34	"The Death of Naruto"; Transliteration: "Naruto Shisu" (Japanese: ナルト死す)	Directed by : Masaaki Kumagai; Storyboarded by : Toshiya Niidome	Junki Takegami	Hiromi Okazaki	December 21, 2005	May 10, 2008
166	35	"When Time Stands Still"; Transliteration: "Tomatta Mama no Jikan" (Japanese: 止まったままの時間)	Directed by : Taiki Nishimura; Storyboarded by : Ichizō Kobayashi	Junki Takegami	Dae Hoon Kim	January 4, 2006	May 17, 2008
167	36	"When Egrets Flap Their Wings"; Transliteration: "Shirasagi no Habataku Jikan" (Japanese: 白鷺の羽ばたく時間)	Directed by : Hayato Goda; Storyboarded by : Tsubute Hyakuno	Junki Takegami	Zenjirō Ukulele	January 4, 2006	May 17, 2008
Standalone side story
168	37	"Mix It, Stretch It, Boil It Up! Burn Copper Pot, Burn!"; Transliteration: "Moero Zundō! Mazete Nobashite Yude Agero!!" (Japanese: 燃えろ寸胴！混ぜて伸ばして茹で上げろ!!)	Directed by : Kiyomu Fukuda; Storyboarded by : Shigenori Kageyama	Satoru Nishizono	Jin Gu Kim & Ik Hyun Eum	January 18, 2006	May 24, 2008
Kaima Capture
169	38	"Remembrance: The Lost Page"; Transliteration: "Kioku - Ushinawa-reta Pēji" (Japanese: 記憶 失われた頁(ページ))	Toshiya Niidome	Yuka Miyata	Masaru Hyodo	January 25, 2006	May 24, 2008
170	39	"The Closed Door"; Transliteration: "Shōgeki - Tozasa-reta Doa" (Japanese: 衝撃 閉ざされた扉(ドア))	Atsushi Takeyama	Yuka Miyata	Minoru Morita	February 1, 2006	May 31, 2008
171	40	"Infiltration: The Set-Up!"; Transliteration: "Sen'nyū - Shikuma-reta Torappu" (Japanese: 潜入 仕組まれた罠(トラップ))	Directed by : Yūki Kinoshita; Storyboarded by : Tsubute Hyakuno	Yuka Miyata	Yasuhiko Kanezuka	February 8, 2006	May 31, 2008
172	41	"Despair: A Fractured Heart"; Transliteration: "Zetsubō - Hikisaka-reta Hāto" (Japanese: 絶望 引き裂かれた心(ハート))	Directed by : Taiki Nishimura; Storyboarded by : Ichizō Kobayashi	Yuka Miyata & Junki Takegami	Sang Yeob Kim	February 15, 2006	June 7, 2008
173	42	"Battle at Sea: The Power Unleashed!"; Transliteration: "Kaisen - Tokihanata-reta Pawā" (Japanese: 海戦 解き放たれた力(パワー))	Directed by : Masaaki Kumagai; Storyboarded by : Toshiya Niidome	Yuka Miyata & Junki Takegami	Hiromi Okazaki	February 22, 2006	June 7, 2008
Standalone side story
174	43	"Impossible! Celebrity Ninja Art: Money Style Jutsu!"; Transliteration: "Arienēttebayo! Serebu Ninpō: Kinton no Jutsu" (Japanese: ありえねーってばよ！セレブ忍法・金遁の術)	Tsuyoshi Matsumoto	Kou Hei Mushi	Zenjirō Ukulele & Hidehiko Okano	March 1, 2006	June 14, 2008
Buried Gold Excavation
175	44	"The Treasure Hunt Is On!"; Transliteration: "Koko Hore Wan Wan! Maizōkin o Sagase" (Japanese: ここ掘れワンワン！埋蔵金を探せ)	Directed by : Kiyomu Fukuda; Storyboarded by : Shigenori Kageyama	Satoru Nishizono	Ik Hyun Eum & Seong Beom Kim	March 8, 2006	June 14, 2008
176	45	"Run, Dodge, Zigzag! Chase or Be Chased!"; Transliteration: "Shissō, Meisō, Jiguzagu-sō! Otte Owarete Machigaete" (Japanese: 疾走、迷走、ジグザグ走！追って追われて間違えて)	Directed by : Hayato Goda; Storyboarded by : Shinji Satō	Satoru Nishizono	Chiyuki Tanaka	March 15, 2006	June 21, 2008
Standalone side story
177	46	"Please, Mr. Postman!"; Transliteration: "Ō!? Purīzu ♥ Misutā Posutoman" (Japanese: OH(オー)!? ぷりーず♥みすたーぽすとまん)	Hiroshi Kimura	Yasuyuki Suzuki	Minoru Morita	March 22, 2006	June 21, 2008
Star Guard
178	47	"Encounter! The Boy with a Star's Name"; Transliteration: "Deai "Hoshi" no Na o Motsu Shōnen" (Japanese: 出会い｢星｣の名を持つ少年)	Directed by : Atsushi Nigorikawa; Storyboarded by : Seiji Okuda	Junki Takegami	Sang Yeob Kim	March 29, 2006	June 28, 2008
179	48	"The Remembered Lullaby"; Transliteration: "Natsuhi Boshi - Omoide no Komori Uta" (Japanese: ナツヒボシ 思い出の子守唄)	Directed by : Masaaki Kumagai; Storyboarded by : Toshiya Niidome	Junki Takegami	Yasuhiko Kanezuka	April 5, 2006	June 28, 2008

=== Season 5 (2006–07) ===
No. overall	No. in season	Title	Directed by	Written by	Animation directed by	Original release date	English air date
Star Guard
180	1	"Hidden Jutsu! The Price of Ninja Art: Kujaku"; Transliteration: "Hijutsu - Kujaku Myōhō no Daishō" (Japanese: 秘術 孔雀妙法の代償)	Toshiya Niidome	Junki Takegami	Masaru Hyodo	April 12, 2006	July 5, 2008
181	2	"Hoshikage: The Buried Truth"; Transliteration: "Hoshikage - Hōmurisa-rareta Shinjitsu" (Japanese: 星影 葬り去られた真実)	Directed by : Kiyomu Fukuda; Storyboarded by : Shigenori Kageyama	Junki Takegami	Ik Hyun Eum	April 19, 2006	July 5, 2008
182	3	"Reunion: The Remaining Time"; Transliteration: "Saikai - Nokosa-reta Jikan" (Japanese: 再会 残された時間)	Yūki Kinoshita	Junki Takegami	Zenjirō Ukulele	April 26, 2006	July 26, 2008
183	4	"The Star's Radiance"; Transliteration: "Hoshi wa Kagayaki o Mashite" (Japanese: 星は輝きを増して)	Directed by : Hiroshi Kimura; Storyboarded by : Takafumi Hayashi	Junki Takegami	Minoru Morita	May 3, 2006	July 26, 2008
Standalone side stories
184	5	"Kiba's Long Day"; Transliteration: "Inuzuka Kiba no Naga~i Ichinichi" (Japanese: 犬塚キバのなが～い一日)	Directed by : Hayato Goda; Storyboarded by : Rion Kujo	Kou Hei Mushi	Hidehiko Okano & Takenori Tsukuma	May 10, 2006	August 2, 2008
185	6	"A Legend from the Hidden Leaf: The Onbaa!"; Transliteration: "Konohagakure no Densetsu - Onbaa wa Jitsuzai Shita!!" (Japanese: 木ノ葉隠れの伝説 オンバアは実在した!!)	Directed by : Atsushi Nigorikawa; Storyboarded by : Seiji Okuda	Yasuyuki Suzuki	Sang Yeob Kim	May 17, 2006	August 2, 2008
186	7	"Laughing Shino"; Transliteration: "Warau Shino" (Japanese: 笑うシノ)	Directed by : Masaaki Kumagai; Storyboarded by : Shinji Satō	Satoru Nishizono	Hiromi Okazaki	May 24, 2006	August 9, 2008
Peddlers Escort
187	8	"Open for Business! The Leaf Moving Service"; Transliteration: "Kaigyō!! Konoha Hikkoshi Sentā" (Japanese: 開業!! 木ノ葉引越センター)	Directed by : Kiyomu Fukuda; Storyboarded by : Shigenori Kageyama	Shin Yoshida	Ik Hyun Eum	May 31, 2006	August 9, 2008
188	9	"The Mystery of the Targeted Merchants"; Transliteration: "Fukakai - Nerawa-reta Gyōshōnin" (Japanese: 不可解 狙われた行商人)	Yūki Kinoshita	Shin Yoshida	Yasuhiko Kanezuka	June 7, 2006	August 16, 2008
189	10	"A Limitless Supply of Ninja Tools"; Transliteration: "Chikasui - Mujinzō no Ningu" (Japanese: 地下水 無尽蔵の忍具)	Directed by : Hiroshi Kimura; Storyboarded by : Takafumi Hayashi	Shin Yoshida	Minoru Morita	June 14, 2006	August 16, 2008
190	11	"The Byakugan Sees the Blind Spot!"; Transliteration: "Byakugan wa Mita! Jiki Tsukai no Shikaku" (Japanese: 白眼は見た！磁気使いの死角)	Directed by : Yuki Hayashi; Storyboarded by : Toshiya Niidome	Shin Yoshida	Zenjirō Ukulele	June 21, 2006	August 23, 2008
191	12	"Forecast: Death! Cloudy with Chance of Sun!"; Transliteration: "Shi no Senkoku "Kumori Tokidoki Hare"" (Japanese: 死の宣告｢くもり時々晴れ｣)	Directed by : Atsushi Nigorikawa; Storyboarded by : Seiji Okuda	Shin Yoshida	Sang Yeob Kim	June 28, 2006	August 23, 2008
Standalone side stories
192	13	"Ino Screams! Chubby Paradise!"; Transliteration: "Ino Zekkyō! Pocchari ♥ Paradaisu" (Japanese: いの絶叫！ポッチャリ♥パラダイス)	Directed by : Kiyomu Fukuda; Storyboarded by : Shigenori Kageyama	Yuka Miyata	Ik Hyun Eum	July 5, 2006	August 30, 2008
193	14	"Viva Dojo Challenge! Youth Is All About Passion!"; Transliteration: "Biba Dōjōyaburi! Seishun wa Bakuhatsuda" (Japanese: ビバ道場破り！青春はバクハツだ)	Directed by : Hayato Goda; Storyboarded by : Toshiya Niidome	Satoru Nishizono	Hidehiko Okano & Takenori Tsukuma	July 12, 2006	August 30, 2008
194	15	"The Mysterious Curse of the Haunted Castle"; Transliteration: "Kaiki - Norowa-reta Yūrei-jō" (Japanese: 怪奇 呪われた幽霊城)	Directed by : Akira Shimizu; Storyboarded by : Kei Jūmonji	Yasuyuki Suzuki	Yasuhiko Kanezuka	July 19, 2006	September 6, 2008
Third Super-Beast
195	16	"The Third Super-Beast!"; Transliteration: "Daisan no Chōjū - Saidai no Raibaru" (Japanese: 第三の超獣 最大のライバル)	Directed by : Hiroshi Kimura; Storyboarded by : Shinji Satō	Junki Takegami	Minoru Morita	July 26, 2006	September 6, 2008
196	17	"Hot-Blooded Confrontation: Student vs. Sensei"; Transliteration: "Namida no Gekitotsu! Nekketsu Shitei Taiketsu" (Japanese: 涙の激突！熱血師弟対決)	Masaaki Kumagai	Junki Takegami	Hiromi Okazaki	August 9, 2006	September 13, 2008
Recapture Plans of Leaf
197	18	"Crisis: The Hidden Leaf 11 Gather!"; Transliteration: "Daipinchi! Konoha no Jūichi-nin Zen'in Shūgō" (Japanese: 大ピンチ！木ノ葉の11(じゅういち)人全員集合)	Directed by : Atsushi Nigorikawa; Storyboarded by : Seiji Okuda	Satoru Nishizono	Dae Hoon Kim	August 16, 2006	September 13, 2008
198	19	"The Anbu Gives Up? Naruto's Recollection"; Transliteration: "Anbu Mō Teage - Naruto no Kioku" (Japanese: 暗部もお手上げ ナルトの記憶)	Directed by : Yūki Kinoshita; Storyboarded by : Toshiya Niidome	Satoru Nishizono	Zenjirō Ukulele	August 23, 2006	September 20, 2008
199	20	"The Missed Target"; Transliteration: "Matohazure - Mietekita Hyōteki" (Japanese: 的外れ 見えてきた標的)	Directed by : Kiyomu Fukuda; Storyboarded by : Shigenori Kageyama	Satoru Nishizono	Ik Hyun Eum	August 30, 2006	September 20, 2008
200	21	"The Powerful Helper"; Transliteration: "Gen'eki Baribari! Saikyō no Suketto" (Japanese: 現役バリバリ！最強の助っ人)	Directed by : Hayato Goda; Storyboarded by : Kei Jūmonji	Satoru Nishizono	Kumiko Horikoshi & Takenori Tsukuma	September 13, 2006	October 4, 2008
201	22	"Multiple Traps! Countdown to Destruction"; Transliteration: "Tajū Torappu - Hōkai no Kauntodaun" (Japanese: 多重トラップ 崩壊のカウントダウン)	Directed by : Mitsutaka Noshitani; Storyboarded by : Toshiya Niidome	Satoru Nishizono	Shinichi Suzuki	September 20, 2006	October 18, 2008
Battles recap special
202	23	"The Top 5 Ninja Battles!"; Transliteration: "Honjitsu Happyō! Ninja-tachi no Ase to Namida no Meishōbu Besuto Faibu! Otanoshimi no Bangai-hen Moaruttebayo Supesharu" (Japanese: 本日発表！忍者たちの汗と涙の名勝負ベスト5(ファイブ)！お楽しみの番外編もあるってばよスペシャル)	Hayato Date	Yuka Miyata	Seiko Asai	September 27, 2006	November 1, 2008
Yakumo Rescue
203	24	"Kurenai's Decision: Team 8 Left Behind"; Transliteration: "Kurenai no Ketsudan - Torinokosa-reta Daihappan" (Japanese: 紅の決断 とり残された第八班)	Directed by : Akira Shimizu; Storyboarded by : Kei Jūmonji	Junki Takegami	Yasuhiko Kanezuka	October 5, 2006	November 15, 2008
204	25	"Yakumo's Sealed Power"; Transliteration: "Nerawa-reta Yakumo - Fūinsa-reta Nōryoku" (Japanese: 狙われた八雲 封印された能力)	Directed by : Hiroshi Kimura; Storyboarded by : Tetsuji Takayanagi	Junki Takegami	Minoru Morita	October 5, 2006	November 22, 2008
205	26	"Kurenai's Top Secret Mission: The Promise with the Third Hokage"; Transliteration: "Kurenai no Gokuhi Ninmu: Sandaime to no Yakusoku" (Japanese: 紅の極秘任務～三代目との約束～)	Directed by : Masaaki Kumagai; Storyboarded by : Chiyuki Tanaka	Junki Takegami	Hiromi Okazaki	October 5, 2006	December 27, 2008
206	27	"Genjutsu or Reality?"; Transliteration: "Genjutsu ka Genjitsu ka - Gokan o Seisuru Mono" (Japanese: 幻術か現実か 五感を制するもの)	Directed by : Atsushi Nigorikawa; Storyboarded by : Seiji Okuda	Junki Takegami	Dae Hoon Kim	October 19, 2006	January 3, 2009
207	28	"The Supposed Sealed Ability"; Transliteration: "Fūji-rareta Hazu no Nōryoku" (Japanese: 封じられたはずの能力)	Directed by : Yūki Kinoshita; Storyboarded by : Toshiya Niidome	Junki Takegami	Zenjirō Ukulele	October 26, 2006	January 10, 2009
Standalone side story
208	29	"The Weight of the Prized Artifact!"; Transliteration: "Meiki - Kachōfūgetsu no Omosa" (Japanese: 名器 花鳥風月の重さ)	Directed by : Kiyomu Fukuda; Storyboarded by : Shigenori Kageyama	Kou Hei Mushi	Ik Hyun Eum	November 2, 2006	January 24, 2009
Gantetsu Escort
209	30	"The Enemy: Ninja Dropouts"; Transliteration: "Teki wa "Shinobazu"" (Japanese: 敵は｢不忍｣)	Directed by : Hayato Goda; Storyboarded by : Kei Jūmonji	Yasuyuki Suzuki	Takenori Tsukuma & Kumiko Horikoshi	November 9, 2006	January 31, 2009
210	31	"The Bewildering Forest"; Transliteration: "Mayoi no Mori" (Japanese: 迷いの森)	Directed by : Mitsutaka Noshitani; Storyboarded by : Mamoru Sasaki	Yasuyuki Suzuki	Shinichi Suzuki	November 16, 2006	October 25, 2009 (Note: English air dates for Naruto episodes 210–220 refer to its first television broadcast on YTV's Bionix programming block in Canada. Cartoon Network cancelled its run of the series after episode 209 and the final eleven episodes of Naruto remain unaired on U.S. television.)
211	32	"Memory of Flames"; Transliteration: "Honō no Kioku" (Japanese: 炎の記憶)	Directed by : Akira Shimizu; Storyboarded by : Kei Jūmonji	Yasuyuki Suzuki	Yasuhiko Kanezuka	November 30, 2006	October 25, 2009
212	33	"To Each His Own Path"; Transliteration: "Sorezore no Michi" (Japanese: それぞれの道)	Directed by : Hiroshi Kimura; Storyboarded by : Tetsuji Takayanagi	Yasuyuki Suzuki	Minoru Morita	December 7, 2006	November 8, 2009
Menma Memory Search
213	34	"Vanished Memories"; Transliteration: "Ushinawa-reta Kioku" (Japanese: 失われた記憶)	Directed by : Masaaki Kumagai; Storyboarded by : Kei Jūmonji	Shin Yoshida	Hidehiko Okano & Gorou Sessha	December 14, 2006	November 8, 2009
214	35	"Bringing Back Reality"; Transliteration: "Torimodoshita Genjitsu" (Japanese: 取り戻した現実)	Atsushi Nigorikawa	Shin Yoshida	Dae Hoon Kim	December 21, 2006	November 15, 2009
215	36	"A Past to Be Erased"; Transliteration: "Keshi Saritai Kako" (Japanese: 消し去りたい過去)	Directed by : Yūki Kinoshita; Storyboarded by : Toshiya Niidome	Shin Yoshida	Zenjirō Ukulele	December 21, 2006	November 15, 2009
Support of Sand
216	37	"The Targeted Shukaku"; Transliteration: "Kieta Takumi - Nerawa-reta Shukaku" (Japanese: 消えた匠 狙われた守鶴)	Directed by : Kiyomu Fukuda; Storyboarded by : Shigenori Kageyama	Junki Takegami	Ik Hyun Eum	January 11, 2007	November 22, 2009
217	38	"Sand Alliance with the Leaf Shinobi"; Transliteration: "Suna no Dōmeikoku - Konoha no Shinobi" (Japanese: 砂の同盟国 木ノ葉の忍)	Directed by : Hayato Goda; Storyboarded by : Kei Jūmonji	Yasuyuki Suzuki	Kumiko Horikoshi & Takenori Tsukuma	January 18, 2007	November 22, 2009
218	39	"Sealed Sand: The Counterattack!"; Transliteration: "Fūji-rareta Suna - Suiko no Hangeki" (Japanese: 封じられた砂 水虎の反撃)	Directed by : Yukio Okazaki; Storyboarded by : Toshiya Niidome	Yasuyuki Suzuki	Shinichi Suzuki	January 25, 2007	November 29, 2009
219	40	"The Ultimate Weapon Reborn"; Transliteration: "Yomigaetta Kyūkyoku Heiki" (Japanese: よみがえった究極兵器)	Directed by : Akira Shimizu; Storyboarded by : Kei Jūmonji	Junki Takegami	Gorou Sessha & Hidehiko Okano	February 1, 2007	November 29, 2009
220	41	"The Departure"; Transliteration: "Tabidachi" (Japanese: 旅立ち)	Directed by : Hiroshi Kimura; Storyboarded by : Tetsuji Takayanagi	Junki Takegami	Minoru Morita	February 8, 2007	December 6, 2009

== Releases ==
=== DVD ===
Naruto Uncut (USA)
Vol.	Date	Discs	Episodes	Reference
1	July 4, 2006	3	1–13	
2	December 5, 2006	3	14–25	
3	May 29, 2007	3	26–38	
4	August 7, 2007	3	39–52	
5	December 4, 2007	3	53–65	
6	February 12, 2008	3	66–78	
7	May 6, 2008	3	79–92	
8	June 10, 2008	3	93–106	
9	August 12, 2008	3	107–120	
10	October 14, 2008	3	121–135	
11	December 16, 2008	3	136–149	
12	February 10, 2009	3	150–163	
13	April 7, 2009	3	164–177	
14	May 26, 2009	3	178–191	
15	July 21, 2009	3	192–205	
16	September 22, 2009	3	206–220	

Naruto Season Box Set (USA)
Box Set	Date	Discs	Episodes	Reference
Season 1, Vol. 1	October 6, 2009	6	1–25	
Season 1, Vol. 2	November 24, 2009	6	26–52	
Season 2, Vol. 1	February 16, 2010	6	53–78	
Season 2, Vol. 2	April 27, 2010	6	79–106	
Season 3, Vol. 1	June 29, 2010	6	107–135	
Season 3, Vol. 2	August 31, 2010	6	136–163	
Season 4, Vol. 1	October 26, 2010	6	164–191	
Season 4, Vol. 2	December 14, 2010	6	192–220	

Naruto Unleashed (UK)
Volume	Date	Box Set Release	Disc	Episodes	Reference
Series 1 Part 1	August 21, 2006	September 3, 2007	3	1–13	
Series 1 Part 2	December 26, 2006	September 3, 2007	3	14–26	
Series 2 Part 1	May 21, 2007	December 24, 2007	3	27–39	
Series 2 Part 2	September 3, 2007	December 24, 2007	3	40–52	
Series 3 Part 1	April 7, 2008	October 20, 2008	3	53–65	
Series 3 Part 2	May 26, 2008	October 20, 2008	3	66–78	
Series 4 Part 1	August 25, 2008	February 23, 2009	3	79–91	
Series 4 Part 2	October 20, 2008	February 23, 2009	3	92–104	
Series 5 Part 1	December 15, 2008	June 29, 2009	3	105–117	
Series 5 Part 2	February 23, 2009	June 29, 2009	3	118–130	
Series 6 Part 1	April 20, 2009	October 26, 2009	3	131–143	
Series 6 Part 2	June 29, 2009	October 26, 2009	3	144–156	
Series 7 Part 1	August 24, 2009	February 1, 2010	3	157–169	
Series 7 Part 2	October 26, 2009	February 1, 2010	3	170–182	
Series 8 Part 1	December 14, 2009	June 14, 2010	3	183–195	
Series 8 Part 2	February 1, 2010	June 14, 2010	3	196–208	
Series 9	April 19, 2010		3	209–220	

Naruto Uncut (AUS/NZ)
Collection	Episodes	DVD release date	Reference
1	1–13	May 14, 2008	
2	14–25	June 11, 2008	
3	26–38	July 23, 2008	
4	39–53	August 20, 2008	
5	54–65	September 17, 2008	
6	66–78	October 22, 2008	
7	79–92	November 12, 2008	
8	93–106	December 3, 2008	
9	107–120	January 14, 2009	
10	121–135	February 18, 2009	
11	136–149	April 15, 2009	
12	150–163	June 24, 2009	
13	164–177	August 19, 2009	
14	178–191	October 21, 2009	
15	192–205	December 16, 2009	
16	206–220	February 17, 2010	
Jump Festa	2003 and 2004 Specials	June 11, 2008	

Naruto Origins (AUS/NZ)
Collection	Episodes	DVD release date	Reference
1	1–52	May 24, 2017	
2	53–106	May 24, 2017	
3	107–163	May 24, 2017	
4	164–220	May 24, 2017	
Complete	1–220	December 5, 2018	

=== Blu-ray ===
Viz Media (Region 1/A)
Set	Date	Discs	Episodes	References
1	November 3, 2020	4	1–27	
2	February 16, 2021	4	28–55	
3	May 11, 2021	4	56–82	
4	August 24, 2021	4	83–110	
5	October 19, 2021	4	111–137	
6	March 1, 2022	4	138–165	
7	June 14, 2022	4	166–192	
8	October 18, 2022	4	193–220	
Complete	January 7, 2025	32	1–220	
