= Gungrave G.O.R.E =

2022 video game

- Developer: Studio IGGYMOB
- Publishers: Prime Matter; Studio IGGYMOB (NS)
- Composer: Tetsuya Shibata; (Note: Others composers who worked in the soundtrack are Yoshino Aoki, Shoya Kitagawa, Ren Tsukagoshi and Jong-Soo We)
- Engine: Unreal Engine 4
- Platforms: PlayStation 4; PlayStation 5; Windows; Xbox One; Xbox Series X/S; Nintendo Switch
- Release: PS4, PS5, Windows, Xbox: WW: November 22, 2022; Nintendo Switch: EU: October 4, 2023; NA: October 18, 2023; JP: January 11, 2024
- Genre: Third-person shooter
- Mode: Single-player

Gungrave G.O.R.E (Gunslinger of REsurrection) is a 2022 third-person shooter video game developed by Studio IGGYMOB and published by Prime Matter. It is the sequel to Gungrave (2002), Gungrave: Overdose (2004), and Gungrave VR (2017). The game received mixed reviews on launch. In 2023, it was released on Nintendo Switch as Gungrave G.O.R.E Ultimate Enhanced Edition, featuring over 100 changes to the base game. A remake with the subtitle Blood Heat in Unreal Engine 5 was announced for the PlayStation 5 and Xbox Series line of consoles.

== Gameplay ==
Seed, a drug that was thought to be eradicated, returns and transforms its users into monsters. Players control Beyond the Grave as he attempts to kill the Raven Clan, who are distributing the drug. Gungrave G.O.R.E is a third-person shooter. Players can shoot enemies with dual pistols, swing Beyond the Grave's coffin to hit nearby enemies, and use several special abilities, such as grabbing enemies to use them as a human shield. If Beyond the Grave avoids moving, he can do extra damage. Additional attacks are unlocked if players continue killing enemies without any pauses in the action. It is not necessary to have played the previous games in the series.

== Development ==
Studio IGGYMOB, a South Korean developer, were fans of the original Japanese video game. They initially struggled to find investors because mobile games were more popular in South Korea. Early designs included an open world element, but they abandoned this after finding it did not fit their vision. Influences included the films Equilibrium and Desperado. Prime Matter released it for Windows, PlayStation 4 and 5, and Xbox One and X/S on November 22, 2022.

A version with "more than 100 gameplay improvements" was announced for Nintendo Switch in September 2023, titled Gungrave G.O.R.E Ultimate Enhanced Edition. It was released in Europe on October 4, 2023, and launched in North America on October 18, 2023. Unlike the original game published by Prime Matter, it was self-published by Studio IGGYMOB. Beep Japan co-published the game in Asia for release on January 11, 2024.

== Reception ==
Reception

Aggregate score
Aggregator	Score
Metacritic	(PC) 57 (PS5) 57 (XSXS) 56

Review scores
Publication	Score
Destructoid	(PS5) 70
Edge	(PS5) 40
IGN	(PC) 6/10
PC Games (DE)	(PS5) 50
Play	(PS5) 40

Gungrave G.O.R.E received mixed reviews on Metacritic. Although praising its style and combat, IGN said it does not live up to its potential because of too-similar enemies, difficulty spikes, and "often-frustrating design decisions". Hardcore Gamer said it can be "basic and repetitive" but recommended it for players who are looking for something they can play without thinking. Push Square said it "genuinely feels like a lost PS2 game" but recommended it only to fans of the series. Digitally Downloaded's reviewer found it to live up a longtime fantasy of playing a nearly-immortal protagonist in a series of highly stylistic action sequences but found the result to be a terrible game.
