= Gungrave (TV series) =

2003 Anime

- DVD cover art for volume 1 released by Geneon

ガングレイヴ (Gangureivu)
- Genre: Crime; Supernatural thriller
- Anime television series
- Directed by: Toshiyuki Tsuru
- Produced by: Hideki Gotō; Masao Morosawa; Shigeru Kitayama; Tōru Kubo
- Written by: Yōsuke Kuroda
- Music by: Tsuneo Imahori
- Studio: Madhouse
- Licensed by: AUS: Madman Entertainment; NA: Funimation; UK: MVM Films
- Original network: TV Tokyo
- English network: CA: G4techTV (Anime Current); US: G4 (Anime Unleashed), Funimation Channel
- Original run: October 7, 2003 – March 30, 2004
- Episodes: 26

Gungrave (ガングレイヴ, Gangureivu) is a Japanese anime television series based on the video game of the same name, created by Yasuhiro Nightow. The series follows Brandon Heat and Harry MacDowell as they rise through the ranks of the Millennion crime syndicate. It was produced and animated by Madhouse, directed by Toshiyuki Tsuru, written by Yōsuke Kuroda, with music composed by Tsuneo Imahori. It was broadcast on TV Tokyo from October 2003 to March 2004, totaling twenty-six episodes.

The series was first licensed in North America by Geneon Entertainment and later by Funimation. It was broadcast on the Funimation Channel in 2011.

== Plot ==
Gungrave opens thirteen years after Brandon Heat is betrayed and killed by his best friend Harry MacDowell. He is reborn through the use of necrolyzation as Beyond The Grave, and begins a quest of revenge against the crime syndicate. The series then backtracks to Brandon's youth, and follows him and Harry as they rise through the criminal underworld, detailing the circumstances that led to their eventual falling-out.

== Characters ==
Brandon Heat / Beyond the Grave
Voiced by: Tomokazu Seki (Japanese); Kirk Thornton (English)
A small-time criminal who was in a gang with his best friend, Harry McDowell, along with three other close friends. After their friends were killed, Brandon and Harry joined the crime syndicate Millennion, led by Big Daddy. After joining Millennion, Brandon was assigned to a small collection crew in the West District, where they collected the organization's income from its illegal race track betting and black market operations. After being proven by a special assignment recommended by Harry, his affiliation with Maria, and risking his life for Big Daddy, Brandon began to move up within the ranks of the organization. Brandon was trained by Millennion's Bear Walken to be a sweeper (assassin), eventually forming his own elite sweeper unit within Millennion called "True Graves".
As Harry rose to power, Brandon remained loyal to the syndicate. Brandon confronted Harry for betraying the organization, but found himself unable to kill his friend. Instead, Harry kills Brandon during his moment of hesitation. Brandon was resurrected by Dr. Tokioka as "Beyond the Grave". His purpose is to destroy the syndicate that he once worked for and the friend who betrayed him. At the end of the anime, Brandon chose to protect Harry instead of killing him out of respect for their old friendship. It's unknown whether he lives or dies when Mika finally arrives, however, he does live and appear in multiple sequels in the canon of the game series. He acts like a parental figure to Mika, and told her to move on as he no longer belongs to the living.
Harry McDowell
Voiced by: Tsutomu Isobe (old), Kenji Hamada (young) (Japanese); Tom Wyner (old), Tony Oliver (young) (English)
Harry McDowell always wanted true freedom. Even when he was young, he could not stand being held back or put in his place. He used his ambition to rise in the ranks of Millennion with the help of his best friend, Brandon Heat. Impatient by nature, Harry began to plot the murder of Millennion's leader, Big Daddy, when he could not advance any further in the syndicate.
As Harry's dreams become reality, he grows insane. The slightest sign of hesitation is taken as betrayal, and betrayal is punished with death. Harry succeeded in killing Big Daddy as well as hundreds of others in his quest for freedom, earning him the name "Bloody Harry". One of his victims was Brandon Heat. Now, thirteen years later, Harry targets Big Daddy's daughter, Mika Asagi, as his next victim. However, Brandon has returned as Beyond the Grave to protect her against Harry's push to destroy the last piece of Big Daddy's legacy.
Maria Asagi
Voiced by: Kikuko Inoue (Japanese); Michelle Ruff (English)
Maria is the sweet, clean-cut girl down the street, a contrast of Brandon's bad-boy image. Throughout the series, Maria makes her feelings for Brandon very clear. When she accepts Mr. Asagi's offer to live with him after her Uncle Jester dies, Maria is unaware that she is moving into the home of Big Daddy, head of Millenion. Brandon follows her and joins Millenion in hopes of being close to her, and for a while it works out.
It is when Brandon becomes a sweeper that their relationship crumbles. He finds it harder and harder to face Maria with every person he kills, and soon he stops visiting her altogether. Maria eventually figures out what is going on, and once she does, the strong-willed woman decides to confront the man she loves. However, vowing to follow Big Daddy, he refuses to give up his life as a hit man for the mob and calmly but coldly rejects Maria, who then marries Big Daddy.
Mika Asagi
Voiced by: Kumi Sakuma (Japanese); Kari Wahlgren (English)
The daughter of Big Daddy by Maria. After the incident at her home, her mother tells her to seek protection from Brandon. Throughout the series, she goes through many hardships as she sees those close to her pass away one by one. Her personality is similar to Maria's.
In order to stop Brandon from going out and wearing out his body in episode 24, she confesses that she cares for and loves him and asks if he thinks of her as family, and she tells him they should just give up on revenge and runaway together. However, Brandon tells her to move on without him since he is no longer among the living, and knocks her out. In the final episode, Millenion is no longer trying to kill her, and she is seen searching desperately for Brandon. She eventually finds Brandon in the end.
Dr. Tokioka
Voiced by: Motomu Kiyokawa (Japanese); William Frederick Knight (English)
A scientist who developed the necrolyzation process (a process in which dead bodies are brought back to life as nearly invincible zombie-like beings). When Mika came to him, he used the process to bring Grave back to life.
Big Daddy
Voiced by: Iemasa Kayumi (Japanese); Michael McConnohie (English)
Millennion's founder and leader. He started the organization to protect his city and his "Family". He developed a bond with Brandon early in the latter's career in Millenion, which resulted in Brandon giving up Maria to Big Daddy out of loyalty to the man and the organization. Big Daddy was killed by Harry; due to a mental breakdown when Big Daddy revealed that Brandon knew of his betrayal all along. Shaken and angered by the news, Harry vowed to erase every trace of him; including Mika.
Bear Walken
Voiced by: Ryūzaburō Ōtomo (Japanese); Beau Billingslea (English)
A sweeper for Millennion, and one of the oldest members of Big Daddy's inner circle. He stays with the organization after Harry becomes the leader of Millennion for the sake of his daughter (who is married to Harry). Although his vow to protect his daughter and Harry forced him to take sides, he still held some form of loyalty to Big Daddy - as he was the only member of Millenion that Big Daddy confided to about Maria's pregnancy with his child, and he most likely kept it from Harry. Due to his own way of thinking, Big Daddy was no longer a member, thus had no reason to talk of it. He is later killed by a resurrected Brandon, after inviting Brandon to his home for a duel to the death. His last thoughts were of his daughter.
Bob Poundmax
Voiced by: Chafurin (Japanese); Doug Stone (English)
A formerly skinny man, Bob is now a portly, morbidly obese intelligence operative. He rose through the ranks of Millenion with Brandon and Harry. After Harry's ascension to the head of the organization, Bob sat as one of the Big Four under Harry. He became the second "Superior" created after the procedure was perfected and the first to confront Beyond the Grave. He was killed by Brandon after begging for mercy, only to attack Brandon when his back was turned.
Balladbird Lee
Voiced by: Takehito Koyasu (Japanese); Steven Blum (English)
Bob Poundmax's best friend. He owes his life to Harry after it was discovered that he was working with Lightning (a rival group which his older brother Cannon Vulcan was a member of) while in Millennion. However, Harry forgave Balladbird, allowing him to stay in Millennion in exchange for his loyalty. After learning of Bob's death, Lee kidnaps Mika and kills her two friends in the process. Lee is eventually killed in the subway by Brandon's Anti-Superior bullets.
Bunji Kugashira
Voiced by: Fumihiko Tachiki (Japanese); Lex Lang (English)
Bunji Kugashira earned the nickname "Madness" for his skills as a killer. He is an expert both with guns and unarmed. He also has a strange sense of morals. He deems it fine to kill others as a hitman, but he has a strong sense of loyalty to his friends and coworkers.
Bunji first meets Harry MacDowell on a job to kill him. Harry tells Bunji that he is being used, and both men confirm it. Although Harry wants to recruit Bunji for Millennion, it is actually Brandon that persuades him to join. Brandon beats Bunji in unarmed combat, and Bunji has considered Brandon a close companion ever since. Bunji calls a lot of people "brother," but there is a sense that he truly means it when he calls Brandon that. It is this bond that makes facing Grave so difficult. Bunji is killed by Brandon in battle.
Maggie
Voiced by: Komina Matsushita (Japanese); Dorothy Elias-Fahn (English)

== Reception ==
During the series' beginning, Anime News Network panned Brandon's silent attitude displayed in the series' primitive, comparing him negatively with characters with a similar design. When the anime focused on his Brandon's younger persona, Brandon Heat, ANN still felt it was hard to sympathize with him due to his calm demeanor and the anime's slow pace. Nevertheless, ANN looked forward to the time he and his best friend, Harry MacDowel, become enemies as foreshadowed. By the next review, the same site enjoyed how the character has taken action in Millennium organization alongside Harry while also finding his relationship with love interest Maria appealing. DVD Talk enjoyed the early tragic setting the cast are initially put into and, like how ANN, the two become invested in becoming powerful people. Mania Entertainment enjoyed the backstory due to how such friendly people, Brandon and Harry, would become enemies in the series, making it enjoyable. By a following DVD, Mania enjoyed Brandon's darker characterization as a result of being involved in Millennium and how his loyalty for his boss, Big Daddy, results in his tragedy that would later turn him into Grave. In the final review where Grave's lifespan is reaching its limit while facing Harry's forces was praised by the same site due to how the narrative further explores the friendship between the two main characters despite their current situation.

In a more general review, DVD Talk enjoyed the handling of Brandon and Harry's story due to how it changes their personalities while going for enjoyable character arcs. Manga.Tokyo commented that the friendship between Brandon and Harry were the biggest appeal in the anime despite the setting being chaotic due to the quest the two characters face when becoming mafia. Hardcore Gaming 101 enjoyed how the anime corrupts the young Brandon and Harry when working for Millennium leading to the scene in which the former becomes Grave. IGN compared Brandon to Terminator due to his deadly skills but questioned how depressed he is about his job as a gangster and why he would not quit Millennium alongside his love interest. Tomokazu Seki's vocal performance as the two personas was also praised by Mania over the English dub, with Famitsu offering similar comments.
