= Yasuhiro Nightow =

Japanese manga artist

Yasuhiro Nightow 内藤 泰弘
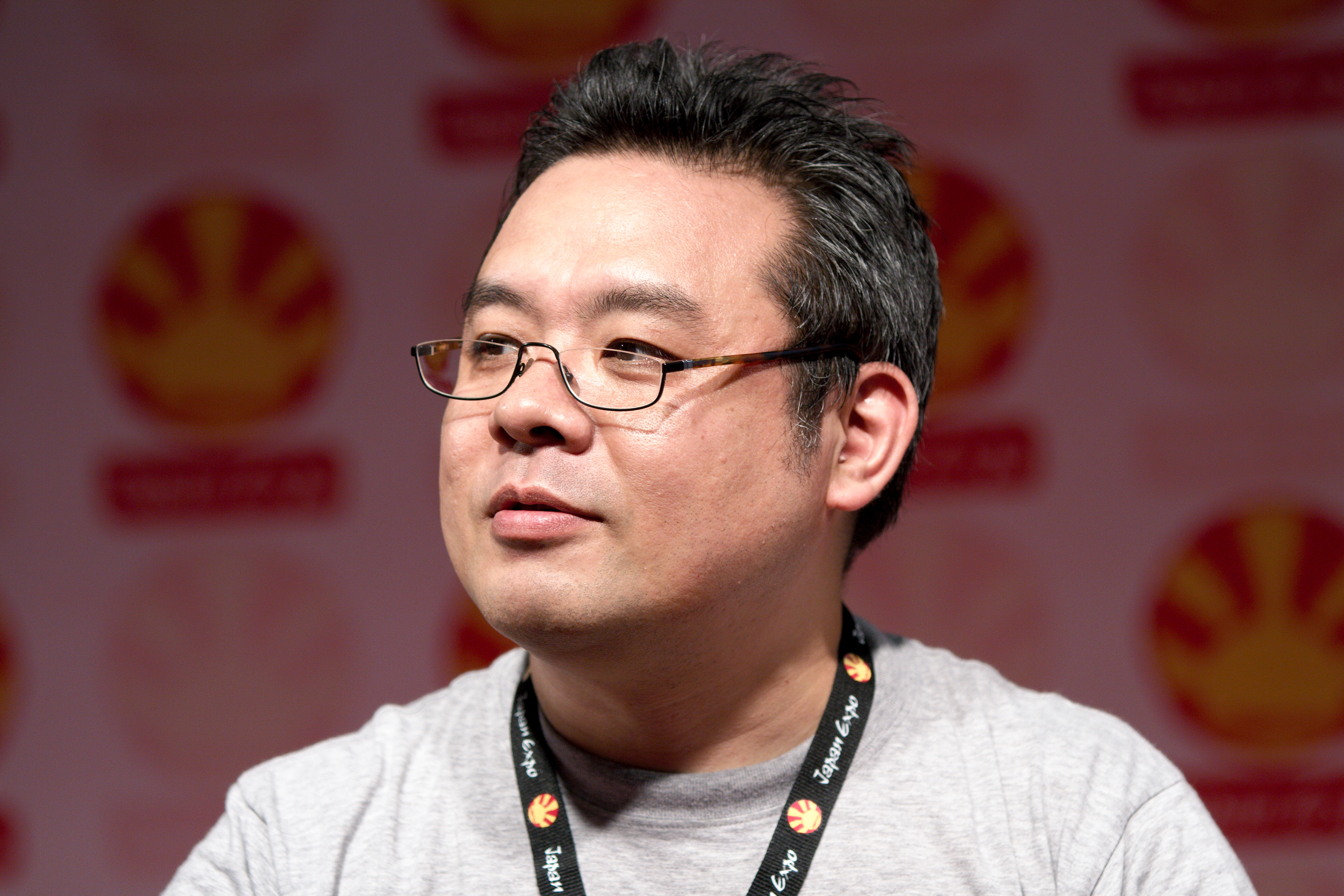
- Yasuhiro Nightow at Japan Expo 2011
- Born: April 8, 1967 (age 59) Yokohama, Japan
- Areas: Manga artist, video game artist, character designer
- Notable works: Trigun, Gungrave, Blood Blockade Battlefront

Yasuhiro Nightow (内藤 泰弘, Naitō Yasuhiro; born April 8, 1967, in Yokohama, Japan) is a Japanese manga artist. His major work Trigun was adapted into an anime series and film. He also designed the characters for the video game and anime series Gungrave, and has been working on the manga Blood Blockade Battlefront.

== Biography ==
Nightow was born in Yokohama, and moved to Yokosuka when he was in elementary school, and spent his junior high and high school years in Shizuoka. His first exposure to comics was through Fujio Akatsuka's Tensai Bakabon, and he was also influenced by the comics of Leiji Matsumoto such as Cosmoship Yamato, Captain Harlock and Galaxy Express 999. He also was drawn to the work done in Shogakukan's Weekly Shōnen Sunday which included artists Rumiko Takahashi and Fujihiko Hosono. Regarding "new wave" artists, he liked Katsuhiro Otomo from Sayonara Nippon, and Fumiko Takano.

He studied social science and then majored in media studies at Housei University. While there, he drew manga as a hobby, and made some dojinshi. After graduation, he worked Sekisui House where he sold apartments. After three and a half years, he quit his job to draw full-time. His first one-shot manga was based on the popular video game franchise Samurai Spirits. He had also developed a story titled "Call XXXX" which was published in Super Jump magazine.

With the help of a publisher friend, he submitted a Trigun story for the February 1995 issue of the Tokuma Shoten magazine Shōnen Captain, and began regular serialization two months later in April. However, Shōnen Captain was canceled early in 1997, and when Nightow was approached by the magazine Young King Ours, published by Shōnen Gahōsha, they were interested in him beginning a new work. Nightow was troubled by the idea of leaving Trigun incomplete, and requested to be allowed to finish the series. The publishers were sympathetic, and the manga resumed in 1997 as Trigun Maximum (トライガンマキシマム, Toraigan Makishimamu). The story jumps forward two years with the start of Maximum. Despite this, Nightow has stated that the new title was purely down to the change of publishers. Trigun Maximum ran until 2007 and generated 14 tankōbon volumes. The Trigun series was adapted into an anime series by Madhouse and had a limited broadcast run in 1998. It received an English adaptation which aired on Cartoon Network. Its popularity in the United States resulted in creation of a feature film Trigun: Badlands Rumble in 2010.

Nightow created the characters and story for the Sega/Red Entertainment third-person shooter video game series Gungrave. The series also received an anime adaptation.

In 2009, Nightow started a new manga series Blood Blockade Battlefront, which was serialized in Jump Square various magazines from Jump SQ.19 to Jump SQ. Crown. The series follows the adventures of a photographer who acquires supernatural visions and gets involved in an organization to fight monsters and terrorists.

== Works ==
Title	Year	Notes	Refs
Samurai Spirits	1994–95	Serialized in Family Computer Magazine; Published by Tokuma Intermedia Comics in a single volume. Later reprinted in 2013 with a new cover in a deluxe edition.	
Trigun	1995–97	Serialized in Monthly Shōnen Captain; Published by Tokuma Shoten in 3 volumes Later reprinted by Shōnen Gahōsha in 2 volumes.	
Energy Breaker	1996	Character design, video game	
Trigun Maximum	1997–2007	Serialized in Young King Ours; Published by Shōnen Gahōsha in 14 volumes	
Gungrave	2002	Character design, video game	
Samurai Shodown V	2003	Character design of Kusaregedo, video game	
Gungrave: Overdose	2004	Character design, video game	
Pen & Ink	2006	Published by Digital Manga. A guide to penning and inking manga Book, with Satoshi Shiki and Oh! Great	
Blood Blockade Battlefront (Kekkai Sensen)	2009–15	Serialized in Jump SQ.19, Jump SQ. Crown; Published by Shueisha in 10 volumes	
Blood Blockade Battlefront Back 2 Back (Kekkai Sensen Back 2 Back)	2015–22	Serialized in Jump SQ. Crown, Jump SQ. RISE; Published by Shueisha in 10 volumes	
S.Flight	2018	Published by Kadokawa Shoten. A collection of six one-shots done by Yasuhiro Nightow from 1989 to 1997.	
Blood Blockade Battlefront Beat 3 Peat (Kekkai Sensen Beat 3 Peat)	2022–ongoing	Serialized in Jump SQ. RISE	
