= Toshiyuki Tsuru =

Japanese anime director

- 都留 稔幸
- Occupation: Director

Toshiyuki Tsuru (都留 稔幸) is an anime director known for his work on the feature film Naruto the Movie 3: The Animal Riot of Crescent Moon Island. He also directed the anime series Gungrave.

== Filmography ==
| Year | Title | Crew role | Notes | Source |
|---|---|---|---|---|
| 1994 | Darkside Blues | Key Animation | | |
| 1998 | Serial Experiments Lain | OP Key Animation | | |
| 1998 | Cowboy Bebop | Storyboards (ep 14) | | |
| 1998–1999 | Neo Ranga | Chief Director (eps 25–48) | | |
| 2003–2004 | Gungrave | Director | | |
| 2006 | Naruto the Movie: Guardians of the Crescent Moon Kingdom | Director | | |
| 2007 | Kaiji: Ultimate Survivor | Storyboards (ep 8) | | |
| 2007–2017 | Naruto Shippuden | Series Director (eps 290–295) | | |
| 2009 | Kurokami: The Animation | Storyboards (ep 13) | | |
