= Gungrave: Overdose =

2004 video game

- North American cover art
- Developers: Ikusabune Co., Ltd.
- Publishers: JP: Red Entertainment; NA: Mastiff; EU: Play-It
- Director: Naohito Hanai
- Producer: Tōru Kubo
- Designers: Tomohiro Maruyama; Takashi Hata
- Programmer: Naohito Hanai
- Artist: Yasuhiro Nightow
- Writers: Hidenori Tanaka; Takashi Hino; Tomohiro Maruyama
- Composer: Tsuneo Imahori
- Series: Gungrave
- Platform: PlayStation 2
- Release: JP: March 4, 2004; NA: September 13, 2004; PAL: October 7, 2005
- Genre: Third-person shooter
- Mode: Single-player

Gungrave: Overdose (Note: Japanese: ガングレイヴO.D., Hepburn: Gangureivu Ōbādōsu) is a PlayStation 2 third-person shooter video game developed by animation studio Ikusabune and published by Red Entertainment in Japan and by Mastiff in North America, and a direct sequel to Gungrave. The game was released on March 4, 2004, in Japan, September 15, 2004, in North America and October 7, 2005, in the PAL regions. Gungrave: Overdose picks up where its predecessor left off, and follows its main character through a variety of stages on a path of revenge. It is the only known title fully developed by animation studio Ikusabune, as the previous title was developed by Red Entertainment. (Ikusabune provided animation and cinematics in the first game.)

Two years after the original, Gungrave, and just approaching of that game's anime adaptation, Gungrave: Overdose was released. Preserving Yasuhiro Nightow's flair and artistic style, this outing adds new playable characters to the series and a new story, in which Grave resumes his tale as an unlikely anti-hero tracking down the sadistic son of a Mafia boss who has struck a deal with a symbiotic seed bent on taking over the Earth.

== Reception ==
Reception

Aggregate score
Aggregator	Score
Metacritic	68/100

Review scores
Publication	Score
Edge	4/10
Electronic Gaming Monthly	4/10
Eurogamer	5/10
Famitsu	26/40
Game Informer	4.25/10
GameSpot	7.8/10
GameSpy	3/5
GameZone	7.9/10
IGN	7.8/10
Official U.S. PlayStation Magazine	3.5/5

The game was received more favorably by critics than the first game, but still received mixed reviews according to the review aggregation website Metacritic. Many critics praised the game's longer length, IGN citing that the game can easily last for more than 6 hours, which they say is in stark comparison to the first game's 2 hour length. The game received similar praise for the art and visual style as the first game did, and critics also praised the game's value, GameSpot's Greg Kasavin stating "its good-sized series of action-packed missions, multiple difficulty settings, three different playable characters, and dirt-cheap $15 retail price make it an excellent value." However, the game's graphics were criticized for being simpler in order to prevent the slowdown present in the first game, and the game's lock-on system was criticized for being too unwieldy and confusing. In Japan, Famitsu gave it a score of one six, two sevens, and one six for a total of 26 out of 40.
