= Gungrave =

2002 video game

- Developer: Red Entertainment
- Publishers: JP: Red Entertainment; NA: Sega; PAL: Activision; KR: Sony Computer Entertainment Korea
- Designers: Naohito Hanai; Tomohiro Maruyama; Hidenori Tanaka
- Programmer: Naohito Hanai
- Artist: Yasuhiro Nightow
- Composer: Tsuneo Imahori
- Platform: PlayStation 2
- Release: JP: July 18, 2002; NA: September 17, 2002; EU: November 29, 2002
- Genre: Third-person shooter
- Mode: Single-player

Gungrave (ガングレイヴ, Gangureivu) is a 2002 Japanese third-person shooter video game developed and published by Red Entertainment (Sega in North America and Activision in Europe) for the PlayStation 2. Gungrave follows its main character through a variety of stages on a path of revenge.

While the gameplay received moderate reviews, Gungrave received acclaim for the character designs provided by series creator Yasuhiro Nightow (Trigun) and mechanical designs provided by Kōsuke Fujishima (Oh My Goddess! series, You're Under Arrest series, Sakura Wars series). Both artists' respective styles helped give the game a distinct feel, which (along with fan support) helped Gungrave translate from a video game to an anime series as well as a video game sequel for the PlayStation 2 entitled Gungrave: Overdose in 2004. Cinematics were provided by Ikusabune Co., Ltd., which developed the sequel with Red Entertainment's supervision.

== Gameplay ==
As a third-person shooter, Gungrave focuses on combat. The player advances through hallway-like stages, but has a free range of motion in these areas. The player confronts wave after wave of fighters en route to an end-level boss. Combat varies between gunplay with enemies at a distance and simple melee combat at close range, and the game rates the amount of flair the player uses to destroy everyone and everything in sight.

Players control Beyond the Grave, who is equipped with a damage-absorbing energy shield that can absorb a large amount of damage in addition to his life bar. This shield appears as a blue bar alongside Beyond the Grave's life bar in the game's heads-up display. When the shield is fully depleted, the player is highly vulnerable and further damage reduces the character's health level rapidly. However, the shield will recharge fully if no damage is sustained for a brief period of time.

By performing well during stages, the player can unlock special attacks such as machine guns or rockets launched from the coffin on Beyond the Grave's back. These can be used by charging the beat meter which is represented by a skull on the top left corner of the game's heads-up display. To build the beat meter, Beyond the Grave must perform combos sometimes numbering in hundreds of hits (destroying enemies or practically anything in the game environment). Strategy is required in setting up combos that are as long and devastating as possible, which helps to carry on the over-the-top action of the game.

Stages and some important events within stages are separated by anime cutscenes featuring art by Nightow. This is where the game's story takes place. Characters are expanded on and the player is given a back-story that is not obvious through gameplay alone.

== Story ==
=== Setting ===
The game takes place in an unknown city that is controlled by the Millennion organization. The city is overrun by crime and a mysterious drug known as seed. The story follows Grave as he sets out on a course for revenge against the man who killed him, his former best friend and colleague from Millenion, Harry Macdowell.

Stages in the game are presented as missions issued by Dr. T, and follow Grave as he hunts down the boss of that stage. Settings include a bar, a lab, the subway, and even a traditional Japanese dojo set atop a sky scraper. These environments are complemented or contrasted by the urban environment that surrounds them.

=== Plot ===
The game opens with the young girl dragging an oversized attaché case toward a warehouse with difficulty. "Bloody" Harry Macdowell has just carried out a coup against Big Daddy, the leader of the Millennion organization, and his daughter Mika needs to find someone that can protect her and stop Harry's mad plans. The occupants of this warehouse include a kindly looking old doctor, and a man with a notable scar on his face. Mika arrives, and the man with the scar claims the contents of the case: two massive handguns. That man is revealed to be the game's title character Grave, and now that he is armed he can start his mission.

Gungrave first approaches its stages as a series of missions issued by Dr. T, first to gather information on the current makeup of Millennion from a low-level street gang, and next destroying a research facility that creates Harry's undead soldiers. In the third stage, while attempting to pump information from an informant, Grave comes into contact with the leadership of the Millenion organization—once friends and allies that he now faces as enemies. Each have used the research Harry supported to give themselves inhuman powers. From here on, Grave is hounded by each member as he makes his way to Harry's tower at the heart of the city.

As the player progresses, the game uses anime cutscenes to reflect on the history of young Brandon and Harry, gradually bringing the pair's back story into focus. Close friends, the two had both become lieutenants in the Millennion organization, working directly under Big Daddy, the group's leader. Brandon shared a bond with Big Daddy and some flashbacks show the two sharing more of a father-son relationship. Brandon even let Big Daddy marry the woman he loved so that she could find a better life, but the two remained close. Not content with the power he had been given, Harry asked Brandon to help him kill Big Daddy so that he could take over. When Brandon refused, Harry shot his friend in the left eye, killing him. Fifteen years later, Harry carried out his coup. His actions as leader inspired Dr. T to revive Brandon who was the only person capable of stopping Harry. Dr. T's connection to all of this is not made clear, but he often makes comments that indicate some connection to Brandon's former life.

Grave picks apart the leadership of Millennion to make his way to Harry. At the top of the tower that Harry uses as a headquarters, it is revealed that Big Daddy still lives in the form of a twisted monster. Harry forces Grave to fight his creation, and following the final battle, Harry accepts his defeat graciously and allows his friend to kill him.

With Harry defeated, Mika's protection becomes Grave's only concern, and to keep his promise to Big Daddy of protecting the family, Grave protects Mika while they drive away from this tragedy.

== Development ==
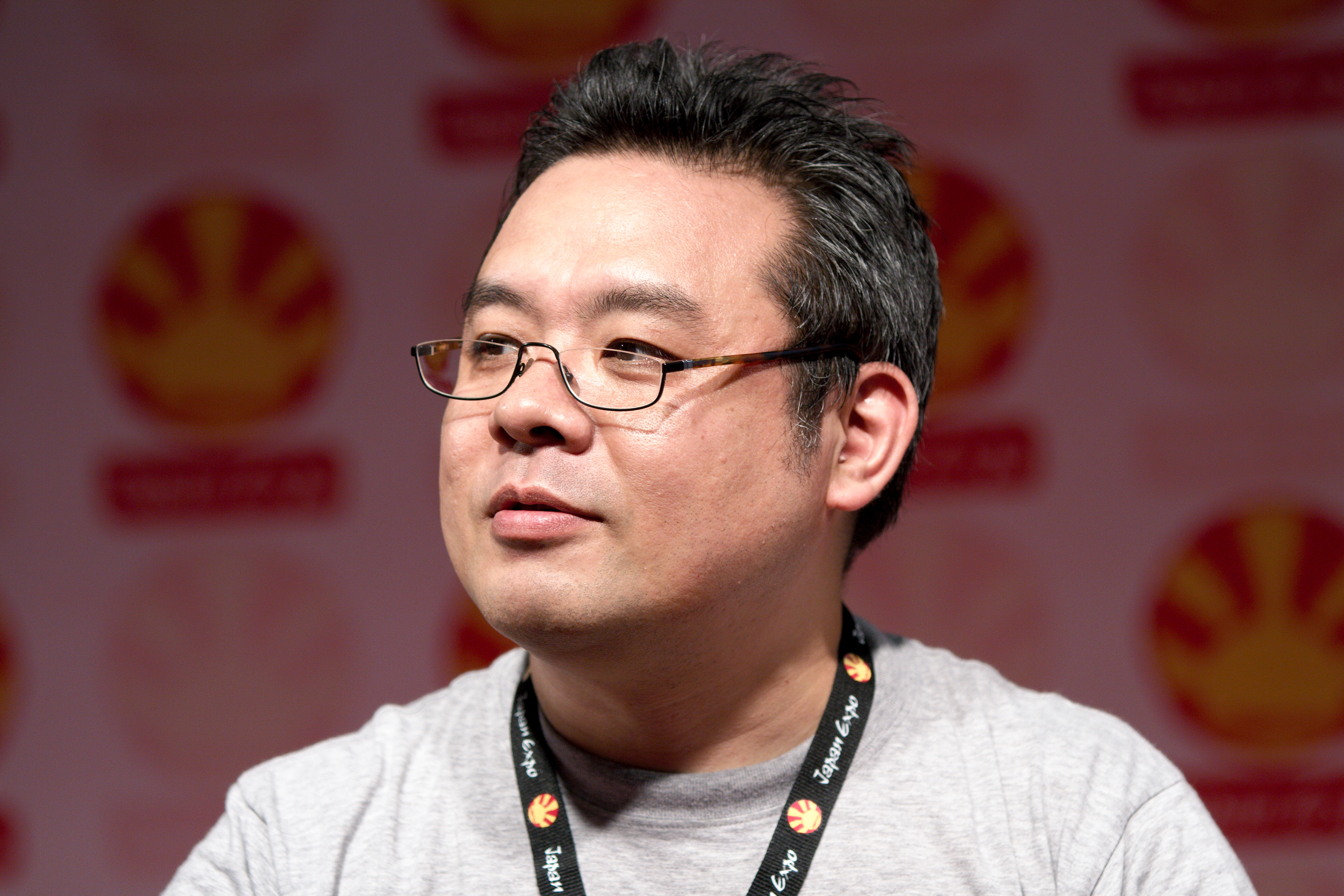
Yasuhiro Nightow created Beyond the Grave

Beyond the Grave was created by manga artist Yasuhiro Nightow. During a convention in America he was approached by game developer Red Entertainment, who asked if there was a certain type of game he was interested in making. In creating Grave, Nightow elaborated he wanted him to be a silent person as he does not enjoy games where the main character talks too much. Nightow explained further influences in the making of the character and believed he was satisfied with the final result. He created Grave from his backside due to how the game would be designed and never thought about how hard it would be to animate him. When the Gungrave anime was released, Nightow noted the issues he made and made a brief plot summary for the staff. Nightow also took a liking to Grave's younger persona, Brandon Heat, being excited in a convention when he met a cosplayer of him. In Gungrave: Overdose the developers wanted to keep showing people Beyond the Grave, as "just how great" he is based on response from the original game. The character is voiced in Japanese by Tomokazu Seki and Kirk Thornton in English.

The game was inspired by multiple action films, most notably those by John Woo. The gameplay was developed in order to be unique rather than a typical action game. Character designer Nightow was attending a convention in the United States and was approached by Red Entertainment during conception of the game which highly influenced their title.

== Reception ==
Reception

Aggregate score
| Aggregator | Score |
|---|---|
| Metacritic | 65/100 |

Review scores
| Publication | Score |
|---|---|
| Edge | 5/10 |
| Electronic Gaming Monthly | 6.83/10 |
| Eurogamer | 4/10 |
| Famitsu | 30/40 |
| Game Informer | 7/10 |
| GamePro | 3.5/5 |
| GameRevolution | D+ |
| GameSpot | 5.1/10 |
| GameSpy | 3/5 |
| GameZone | 7.6/10 |
| IGN | (US) 8/10 (JP) 5/10 |
| Official U.S. PlayStation Magazine | 3.5/5 |
| Entertainment Weekly | A− |
| Playboy | 65% |

The game received "mixed" reviews according to the review aggregation website Metacritic.

Critical reception to Beyond the Grave has been mixed in his introduction. Game Revolution regarded him as a "true hero" due to the skills he possesses, something the players would like control while describing him as an "arthritic Frankenstein" due to experiments have affected his nearly dead body. Nevertheless, his narrative was found common due to his journey to defeat mafia members with supernatural powers. GameSpot drew a similar statement, considering his looks as mix between "cowboy and a vampire" while still keeping a stylish look and liking his interactions with Mika. IGN enjoyed his main design, comparing it with Nightow's Trigun manga but more gothic and labelled him as "cool" due to the intense firepower he displays. In another review, IGN described Grave as "the one notably detailed character model on screen at any given time, since most of the cannon fodder are given comparatively short shrift in the modeling department" and lamented his lack of more diverse moves. In a further analysis of the game while detailing the revenge story arcs as common in fiction, GameSpy found there is a common misinterpretation of Grave as an anti-hero but instead is portrayed as "the reformed gangster, whose loyalty and caring feelings toward those he loves gives him a type of nobility that allows him to somewhat transcend his bloodthirsty one-man war." GamePro enjoyed the character, but describing him as a "low-rent Max Payne".

== Sequels ==
Two years later, Gungrave: Overdose was released and adds new playable characters to the series and a new story.

In 2017, Korean developers Iggymob and Blueside, under the supervision of Red Entertainment, revived the Gungrave series and released Gungrave VR for the PlayStation VR in late 2017 in Japan and late 2018 in North America and Europe. Gungrave VR serves as a prologue to a new sequel titled, Gungrave G.O.R.E (Gunslinger of REsurrection), which was released on November 22, 2022, for PlayStation 4, PlayStation 5, Xbox Series X/S, Xbox One, and PC.
