= List of Blood Blockade Battlefront chapters =

Tenth and final volume cover of the series' first part

The Blood Blockade Battlefront manga is written and illustrated by Yasuhiro Nightow. It originally started in 2008 as a one-shot chapter called Kekkai Sensō, which only featured very few members of the final cast and had a much different tone, with more emphasis on it being a vampire hunting story in a contemporary city. The publication originally began on January 5, 2009, in the Jump Square magazine with the title Kekkai Sensen − Mafūgai Kessha (血界戦線 -魔封街結社-) where it ran until March 4, 2009, followed by another one-shot in October of the same year in Jump SQ-M magazine. The plot revolves around a young photographer named Leonardo Watch, who obtains 'the All Seeing Eyes of the Gods' at the cost of his sister's eyesight. After the incident, Leonardo moves to the city of Hellsalem's Lot to join an organization known as Libra to fight several monsters as well as terrorists.

In May 2010 the manga switched to Jump SQ19 magazine for serial publication. Jump SQ19 magazine ceased publication on February 19, 2015. The first tankōbon volume was released on January 4, 2010; ten volumes have been released as of April 3, 2015. In 2010, the series was licensed for an English release by Dark Horse Comics. In 2025, Dark Horse announced an omnibus edition line, which completed on March 5, 2026, with the release of its third volume.

A direct sequel, Blood Blockade Battlefront: Back 2 Back, started in Jump SQ Crown magazine on July 17, 2015. In 2018, the series was transferred to Jump SQ Rise. The series finished on April 28, 2022. Shueisha collected its chapters in ten volumes, released from January 4, 2016, to August 4, 2022.

A third series Blood Blockade Battlefront: Beat 3 Peat began publishing on October 26, 2022. The first tankōbon volume was released on July 4, 2023. As of July 3, 2026, four volumes have been released.

== Volumes ==
=== Blood Blockade Battlefront ===
No.	Original release date	Original ISBN	English release date	English ISBN
1	January 4, 2010	978-4-08-874723-1	September 27, 2011	978-1-59582-718-0
1. "Those Shrouded In Fog" (霧に烟ぶるものども, Kiri ni Kemuri Buru Monodomo); 2. "Watchman Leo"; 3. "Catastrophe"; 4. "Follow That Phantom Ghost Wagon!" (幻のゴーストワゴンを追え, Maboroshi no gosuto wagon o oe)
2	November 4, 2010	978-4-08-870109-7	May 22, 2012	978-1-59582-912-2
5. "A Game Between Worlds" (二つの世界の間のゲーム, Futatsu no sekai no ma no gēmu); 5.5. "Tonio Andretti's Final Nineteen Hours"; 6. "Bloodline Fever"
3	May 2, 2011	978-4-08-870228-5	November 27, 2012	978-1-59582-913-9
7. "Day In, Day Out"; 7.5. "Pandorum Asylum Rhapsody"; 8. "The Tremorous Blood Hammer" (震撃の血槌, Shingeki no Blood Hammer)
4	December 2, 2011	978-4-08-870339-8	September 17, 2013	978-1-61655-223-7
9. "E-den of Master Fighters"; 10. "One Butler's Blitzkrieg"; 10.5. "Cherchez L'idole"
5	June 4, 2012	978-4-08-870435-7	February 25, 2014	978-1-61655-224-4
11. "Don't Forget To Don't Forget Me"; 12. "Zap's Longest Day Part 1" (Zの一番長い日 前編); 13. "Zap's Longest Day Part 2" (Zの一番長い日 後編)
6	December 4, 2012	978-4-08-870558-3	September 9, 2014	978-1-61655-557-3
14. "Lunge!! Launch!! Lunch!!"; 15. "Werewolf Mission (Chain Possible)"; 16. "The Outlaw Of Green"
7	June 4, 2013	978-4-08-870868-3	February 17, 2015	978-1-61655-568-9
17. "Desperate Fight In The Macro Zone Part 1"; 18. "Desperate Fight In The Macro Zone Part 2"; 19. "Escape From Pain: Chain Reaction"
8	December 4, 2013	978-4-08-870869-0	December 12, 2017	978-1-61655-583-2
20. "King of the King of Restaurants" (王様のレストランの王様, Ōsama no Resutoran no Ōsama); 21. "Phantom World Ward Rises Part 1" (幻界病棟ライゼズ（前編）, Maboroshi-kai Byōtō Raizezu (Zenpen)); 22. "Phantom World Ward Rises Part 2" (幻界病棟ライゼズ（後編）, Maboroshi-kai Byōtō Raizezu (Kōhen))
9	June 4, 2014	978-4-08-880078-3	April 10, 2018	978-1-5067-0705-1
23. "Gill Breathing Blues Part 1" (鰓呼吸ブルース（前編）, Era Kokyū Burūsu (Zenpen)); 24. "Gill Breathing Blues Part 2" (鰓呼吸ブルース（後編）, Era Kokyū Burūsu (Kōhen)); 25. "Bratatat Mom"
10	April 3, 2015	978-4-08-880233-6	August 7, 2018	978-1-5067-0704-4
26. "Spectral Eyes, Phantom Vision Part 1" (妖眼幻視行 Chapter-1, Yōme Genshikō Chapter-1); 27. "Spectral Eyes, Phantom Vision Part 2" (妖眼幻視行 Chapter-2, Yōme Genshikō Chapter-2); 28. "Spectral Eyes, Phantom Vision Part 3" (妖眼幻視行 Chapter-3, Yōme Genshikō Chapter-3); 29. "Spectral Eyes, Phantom Vision Part 4" (妖眼幻視行 Chapter-4, Yōme Genshikō Chapter-4); 30. "Spectral Eyes, Phantom Vision Part 5" (妖眼幻視行 Chapter-5, Yōme Genshikō Chapter-5)

=== Blood Blockade Battlefront: Back 2 Back ===
No.	Release date	ISBN
1	January 4, 2016	978-4-08-880542-9
1.1 "Lights, Camera, Action!" Part 1; 1.2 "Lights, Camera, Action!" Part 2; 1.5. "Great Escape Handcuff" Part 1; 1.6. "Great Escape Handcuff" Part 2; 1.7. "Wacky Jive in HL"; 1.8. "One Butler's Gold Blend"
2	September 2, 2016	978-4-08-880783-6
2. "Get The Lock Out!!" Part 1; 3, "Get The Lock Out!!" Part 2; 3.5. "Baccadio's Drop"; 4. "Midnight Blue"
3	September 4, 2017	978-4-08-881174-1
5. "Dead of Night Warfare" Part 1; 6. "Dead of Night Warfare" Part 2; 7. "Dead of Night Warfare" Part 3
4	December 4, 2017	978-4-08-881294-6
8. "Angry Young Merman"; 8.5. "Zapp Renfro Retribution In"; 9. "V-Dimension Lineage"
5	July 4, 2018	978-4-08-881517-6
10. "The Prisoner Inside the Imprisoned Saint"; 11.1 "My Life as a Doc" Part 1; 11.2 "My Life as a Doc" Part 2
6	March 4, 2019	978-4-08-881770-5
12. "Sonic Speed Disaster!"; 13. "Be Quiet and Follow Me" Part 1; 14. "Be Quiet and Follow Me" Part 2
7	December 4, 2019	978-4-08-882151-1
15. "Calamity Auction" Part 1; 16. "Calamity Auction" Part 2; 17. "Calamity Auction" Part 3
8	September 4, 2020	978-4-08-882501-4
18. "Calamity Auction" Part 4; 19. "Calamity Auction" Part 5; 20. "Calamity Auction" Part 6
9	June 4, 2021	978-4-08-882672-1
21. "Calamity Auction" Part 7; 22. "Calamity Auction" Part 8; 23. "Calamity Auction" Part 9
10	August 4, 2022	978-4-08-883202-9
24. "Calamity Auction" Part 10; 25. "Calamity Auction" Part 11; 26. "Calamity Auction" Part 12; 27. "Calamity Auction" Part 13

=== Blood Blockade Battlefront: Beat 3 Peat ===
No.	Release date	ISBN
1	July 4, 2023	978-4-08-883571-6
2	April 4, 2024	978-4-08-883853-3
3	February 4, 2025	978-4-08-884291-2
4	July 3, 2026	978-4-08-885081-8
