= List of Blood Blockade Battlefront characters =

The primary members of Libra (from left to right): Gilbert F. Altstein, K.K., Dog Hummer, Steven A. Starphase, Klaus Von Reinherz, Leonardo Watch, Zapp Renfro, Chain Sumeragi, and Zed O'Brien

This is a list of characters for the manga and anime series Blood Blockade Battlefront.

== Libra ==
=== Leonardo Watch ===
Voiced by: Ryōta Ōsaka (vomic), Daisuke Sakaguchi (anime) (Japanese); Aaron Dismuke (English)

Leonardo Watch (レオナルド・ウォッチ, Reonarudo Wotchi) is a kind and humble young photographer who came to Hellsalem's Lot to help his ailing sister. A mysterious entity gave him the "All Seeing Eyes of the Gods" (神々の義眼, Kamigami no Gigan), granting him a variety of powerful ocular powers, at the cost of his sister's sight. His eyes have their limits; when overused, they have a tendency to "shatter", causing his eyes to bleed. He tends to be bullied by Zapp and his lack of fighting skills usually puts him in danger, especially against those who covet his power.

=== Klaus Von Reinherz ===
Voiced by: Tarusuke Shingaki (vomic), Rikiya Koyama (anime) (Japanese); Phil Parsons (English)

Klaus Von Reinherz (クラウス・V(フォン)・ラインヘルツ, Kurausu Fon Rainherutsu) is the leader of Libra. A large, very powerful man with a distinctive underbite, he is actually very well composed and gentlemanly and honest to a fault, with an unshakable will. Master of the Brain Grid Blood Battle Technique (ブレングリード流血闘術, Buren Gurīdo-ryū Kettō Jutsu), which he can use to create large cross-shaped weaponry and seal away enemies. Klaus is also very intelligent, being able to play a chess-like called Prosfair for a period of ninety-nine hours against a being that has studied the game for thousands of years.

His ultimate technique allows him to imprison the Blood Breeds, as they can not be killed due to their immortal nature, but to do so, he must learn the enemy's true name, thus requiring Leo using his powers to reveal it.

=== Zapp Renfro ===
Voiced by: Yoshimasa Hosoya (vomic), Kazuya Nakai (anime) (Japanese); Ian Sinclair (English)

Zapp Renfro (ザップ・レンフロ, Zappu Renfuro) is a hot-blooded, womanizing Libra member and master of the Big Dipper Blood-Fighting Style (斗流血法, Hikitsuboshiryū Keppō)'s Kagutsuchi branch, which allows him to manipulate his blood into blades and explosions. He is very well trained, being able to keep up with beings much faster than what the human eye can normally follow. His juvenile actions often get him and the rest of Libra into trouble. He is Leonardo's partner and despite his usual attitude, he cares about him in some way. He is always trying to defeat Klaus in a battle but is always the one to lose.

=== Chain Sumeragi ===
Voiced by: Seiko Yoshida (vomic), Yū Kobayashi (anime) (Japanese); Trina Nishimura (English)

Chain Sumeragi (チェイン・皇(すめらぎ), Chein Sumeragi) is a suit-clad werewolf with the power of invisibility and collaborator from the Loups-Garous from Nowhere (人狼局特殊諜報課(ルー・ガルーズフロムノーウェア), Rū-Garūzu furomu Nōuea) organization. She can move at high speeds (being able to keep up with Zapp's chain of explosions from one end of the real world to deep into the alter-world) and does a large portion of Libra's reconnaissance work. Her personality is sadistic, often causing physical harm to others or showing indifference to those in peril (mainly to Zapp for his womanizing tendencies). However, she is shown to be somewhat caring of her teammates at certain points in the series, mostly evidenced towards Leo. Her power is erasing her presence, which needs a link (a chain) to connect her to the world in order to counter the effect of her ability or she will cease to exist.

=== Steven A. Starphase ===
Voiced by: Kenji Hamada (vomic), Mitsuru Miyamoto (anime) (Japanese); J. Michael Tatum (English)

Steven A. Starphase (スティーブン・A・スターフェイズ, Sutībun Ē Sutāfeizu) is Libra's second-in-command. A shady man with many connections, and a genius of deception and intuition. Master of the Esmerelda Blood Freeze (エスメラルダ式血凍道, Esumeraruda-shiki Kettōdō), a kick-based fighting style that freezes enemies on contact. He is a gentleman, like Klaus.

=== K.K. ===
Voiced by: Ai Orikasa (Japanese); Stephanie Young (English)

A lively and confident Libra member who sports an eye patch, who can be very impatient at times, but also motherly. She is very devoted to her husband and two young sons and fights with 954 Blood Bullet Arts (954血弾格闘技(ブラッドブレットアーツ), Nain Faibu Fō Buraddo Buretto Ātsu) using high-power guns that electrocute enemies.

=== Gilbert F. Altstein ===
Voiced by: Shinya Fukumatsu (vomic), Banjō Ginga (anime) (Japanese); Francis Henry (English)

Gilbert F. Altstein (ギルベルト・F・アルトシュタイン, Giruberuto Efu Arutoshutain) is Klaus' butler and member of Libra. His face is covered with bandages, making him appear similar to a mummy. He is known for being a famous combat butler, and has regenerative powers. He drives a custom vehicle with many weapons, and is very fierce despite his even demeanor. Handles most of Libra's intelligence work.

=== Deldro Brody and Dog Hummer ===
Voiced by: Keiji Fujiwara (Japanese); Mike McFarland (English) (Deldro Brody)
Voiced by: Mamoru Miyano (Japanese); Orion Pitts (English) (Dog Hummer)

Deldro Brody (デルドロ・ブローディ, Derudoro Burōdi) and Dog Hummer (ドグ・ハマー, Dogu Hamā) are two men in one body. Dog Hummer is a handsome man who had his blood replaced with the liquefied body of the serial killer and "bad boy" Deldro Brody. Brody can materialize as a gigantic living armor that surrounds Hummer called Exocrimson (殖装甲血槌のハマー(エキソクリムゾン), Ekisokurimuzon), granting him immense physical strength. The two are often kept sealed away in the deepest part of Hellsalem's Lot's largest prison but are sometimes called up to aid Libra in dire situations, due to their raw power.

=== Zed O'Brien ===
Voiced by: Hikaru Midorikawa (Japanese); Alex Organ (season 1), Christopher Wehkamp (season 2) (English)

Zed O'Brien (ツェッド・オブライエン, Tseddo Oburaien) is a stern merman with similar powers to Zapp, as they were both taught by the same master. However, Zed's ability is wind-based, unlike Zapp, who is fire-based. Joins Libra after being abandoned by his master in Hellsalem's Lot. Zed is trained to use the Shinatobe branch of the Big Dipper blood-fighting style, which generates tridents and threads from his blood.

=== Blitz T. Abrams ===
Voiced by: Akio Otsuka (Japanese); Mark Stoddard (English)

Blitz T. Abrams (ブリッツ・T・エイブラムス, Burittsu Tī Eiburamusu) is Klaus' former mentor and world-famous vampire hunter. His nickname Lucky Abrams (豪運のエイブラムス, Gōun no Eiburamusu) is the result of the many curses placed on him by his vampire enemies that he has made over the years. Whether it's due to his luck or the curses counteracting each other, Abrams has never actually been harmed from it. However, countless people have fallen victim to the curse in his stead which has left him to be rightly feared by some of his colleagues at Libra.

=== Patrick ===
Voiced by: Unshō Ishizuka (Japanese); Major Attaway (season 1), Ray Hurd (season 2) (English)

Patrick (パトリック, Patorikku) is Libra's arms craftsman, dealer and occasional combatant.

=== Neyka ===
Voiced by: Reina Ueda (Japanese); Alexis Tipton (English)

Neyka (ニーカ, Nīka) is Patrick's ponytailed assistant, very skilled and also gluttonous, having spent an entire Libra office party just eating food.

=== Sonic Speed Monkey ===
Voiced by: Yūma Uchida (Japanese); Monica Rial (English)

Sonic Speed Monkey (音速猿, Onsokuzaru) is a monkey that is capable of moving at the speed of sound, also known simply as Sonic. It steals Leonardo's camera, but eventually becomes his pet after Leo saves him.

== Others ==
=== Femt ===
Voiced by: Akira Ishida (Japanese); Jessie James Grelle (English)

Femt (フェムト, Femuto) is the self-proclaimed King of Depravity (堕落王, Daraku-ō), ruler of Hellsalem's lot, and the ringleader of a powerful crime syndicate operating in the city known as the Thirteen Kings. Known for his sadistic personality and tendency to stir havoc in Hellsalem's lot merely for the sake of excitement. To this end, he is always willing to give his enemies a chance to win (though he'll often throw temper tantrums when they do).

=== Aligura ===
Voiced by: Satomi Kōrogi (Japanese); Tia Ballard (English)

Aligura (アリギュラ, Arigyura) is the Queen of Monomania (偏執王, Henshū-ō). She is the one who fused Dog and Deldro in order to create her "ideal boyfriend" with the power and ruthlessness of the latter and the handsomeness of the former. As her title of monomania implies, when Aligura finds something she wants, she'll devote everything she has to get it without any regard for whatever may stand in her way.

=== Theodora ===
Theodora (ゼオドラ, Zeodora) is the Queen of Hypersensitivity (過敏王, Kabin-ō), considered the hardest of the Thirteen Kings to handle. Theodora is said to reside in the deepest part of Hellsalem's Lot. She possesses such a sensitive nervous system that it is able to detect almost all activity in the city. Through contracts, she is also capable of improving the nervous systems of others to a similar level provided they can handle the stress of it.

=== Michella Watch ===
Voiced by: Nana Mizuki (Japanese); Sarah Wiedenheft (English)

Michella Watch (ミシェーラ・ウォッチ, Mishēra Wotchi) is Leonardo's little sister whose sight was stolen by a demon who forcibly implanted the "All Seeing Eyes" on her brother. The events of the series are narrated to her by Leonardo.

=== Vivian ===
Voiced by: Miyuki Sawashiro (Japanese); Lindsay Seidel (English)

Vivian (ビビアン, Bibian) is a girl working at Diannes Diner, a local that Leonardo usually frequents. She cares about him quite a bit, comforting him with food or drink when he needs it.

=== Master ===
Voiced by: Riki Kagami

Master (マスター, Masutā) is the owner and proprietor of Diannes Diner and Vivian's father.

=== Don Arlelelle Eruca Fulgrouche ===
Voiced by: Shōzō Iizuka (Japanese); Kenny Green (English)

Don Arlelelle Eruca Fulgrouche (ドン・アルルエル・エルカ・フルグルシュ, Don Arurueru Eruka Furugurushu) is a powerful mob boss of the alterworld, and huge fan of Prosfair. Being made out of various brains, and with the ability to bend space and time, Arlelelle's skill on Prosfair is insurmountably high. Because of this, he does favors to humans who win Prosfair endurance matches against him; losers give the "remainder of their lives" to him, their minds incorporated into Arlelelle's brains so as to continue playing the game against him until life's end. Klaus is a friend of Arlelelle's, having endured 5 matches against him, and thus Arlelelle is much more lenient and accepting of Klaus' requests.

=== Amagranoff Luozontam Ouv Lee Neji ===
Voiced by: Ikue Ōtani (Japanese); Alison Viktorin (English)

Amagranoff Luozontam Ouv Lee Neji (アマグラナフ・ルォゾンタム・ウーヴ・リ・ネジ, Amaguranafu Rozontamu Ūvu Ri Neji), nicknamed "Neji", is a Beyondian with a huge affinity for hamburgers from the segregated franchise Jack & Rocket's (a take on Johnny Rockets). He has physical characteristics similar to a mushroom, and releases memory-erasing spores when put through heavy stress. The power of the spores is evident: he does not remember his mother and neither does his mother remember him. Leonardo bought hamburgers for Neji, and the two became friends; however, after certain events happened in the series with people trying to sell Neji's spores as weapons, Neji releases spores that are too powerful, and thus he and Leonardo must restart their friendship, as they have forgotten each other.

"Neji" means "screw" in Japanese, and his design resembles a short plus screw shape.

=== Raju Jugei Shizuyoshi ===
Voiced by: Hidekatsu Shibata (Japanese); R. Bruce Elliott (English)

Raju Jugei Shizuyoshi (裸獣汁外衛賤厳, Rajū Jūgē Shizuyoshi) is a legendary blood fighter, considered a "Blood Battle God" (血闘神, Kettōshin), founder of the Big Dipper style blood technique and the master of Zapp and Zed. It is not known if he is alien or human, as he lost most of his body during blood training, being only an arm and a barely visible face under a tattered robe and a wild boar skull. With a biting personality and brutal discipline of training, he and Zapp stood on acrimonious terms. Known for disappearing for decades at a time and taking down high-ranked Blood Breeds, he comes to Hellsalem's Lot while fighting the Blood Breed Herlelle Lucando Lozo Thietkaua gi Murmhavat, along the way rigorously testing Zapp and leaving Zed at the hands of Libra, before a sudden disappearance.

=== Lieutenant Daniel Low ===
Voiced by: Yūya Uchida (Japanese); Justin Cook (English)

Lieutenant Daniel Low (ダニエル・ロウ警部補, Danieru Rō Keibuho) is a police officer who requests cooperation from Libra on risky situations in exchange for not arresting the organization.

=== Angelica ===
Voiced by: Rina Kitagawa (Japanese); Jamie Marchi (English)

Angelica (アンジェリカ, Anjerika) is a code name used by the secretary of the League of High Order Spirituals. She can use her powers to teleport. Zapp develops feelings for her when he first meets her at a KDFC restaurant.

=== Elder ===
Voiced by: Ikuya Sawaki (Japanese); Duncan Brannan (English)

Elder (長老, Chōrō) is the ode name used by the general manager of the NY branch of the League of High Order Spirituals. He acts as a fixer for the league, and also works as a hospital doctor. He is a mastermind of bai sema. In the anime, he asks for Libra's help in tracing the whereabouts of Black and White.

== Anime-only characters ==
=== White ===
Voiced by: Rie Kugimiya (Japanese); Megan Emerick (English)

White (ホワイト, Howaito) is a mysterious girl that appears before Leo and becomes friends with her. She is, in reality, not a human, but a sentient barrier, one of the many (not sentient ones) holding back the Great Collapse from happening. The reason for her still being on the Earth is by her parents' sacrifice to make her part of the barriers. At the end of the first season, she sacrifices herself to completely reseal the Great Collapse again, as the rest had been destroyed by her brother. Her brother aids her in this feat, being repentant of his actions. Though she dies at the climax of the first season, the second season strongly implies that her spirit is watching out for Leo. Her real name is Mary Macbeth (メアリー・マクベス, Mearī Makubesu).

=== Black ===
Voiced by: Rie Kugimiya (Japanese); Micah Solusod (English)

Black (ブラック, Burakku) is White's older twin brother who shares his body with the King of Despair (絶望王, Zetsubō-ō), one of the Thirteen Kings who has an interest in Leo. Black had taken up the mantle of a blood breed host in order to save his sister. His Blood Breed also tries to cause the Great Collapse a second time but at the end he rebels against his Blood Breed and accepts his sister's wish to sacrifice herself in order to save the world, and helps her with it. His real name is William Macbeth (ウィリアム・マクベス, Uiriamu Makubesu).

=== Benjamin and Emma Macbeth ===
Voiced by: Hidenobu Kiuchi (Japanese); Chris Hury (English) (Benjamin)
Voiced by: Yukana (Japanese); Jessica Cavanagh (English) (Emma)

Benjamin Macbeth (ベンジャミン・マクベス, Benjamin Makubesu) and Emma Macbeth (エマ・マクベス, Ema Makubesu) are the deceased parents of William and Mary, both of them came from families of pureblood psychic casters and were investigators for the League of High Order Spirituals. Benjamin and Emma also worked, respectively, on a whiskey factory and as a housewife, and both were shepherds. The family's story is based on the play of the same name.
