= Daisuke Sakaguchi =

Japanese voice actor (born 1973)

- 阪口 大助
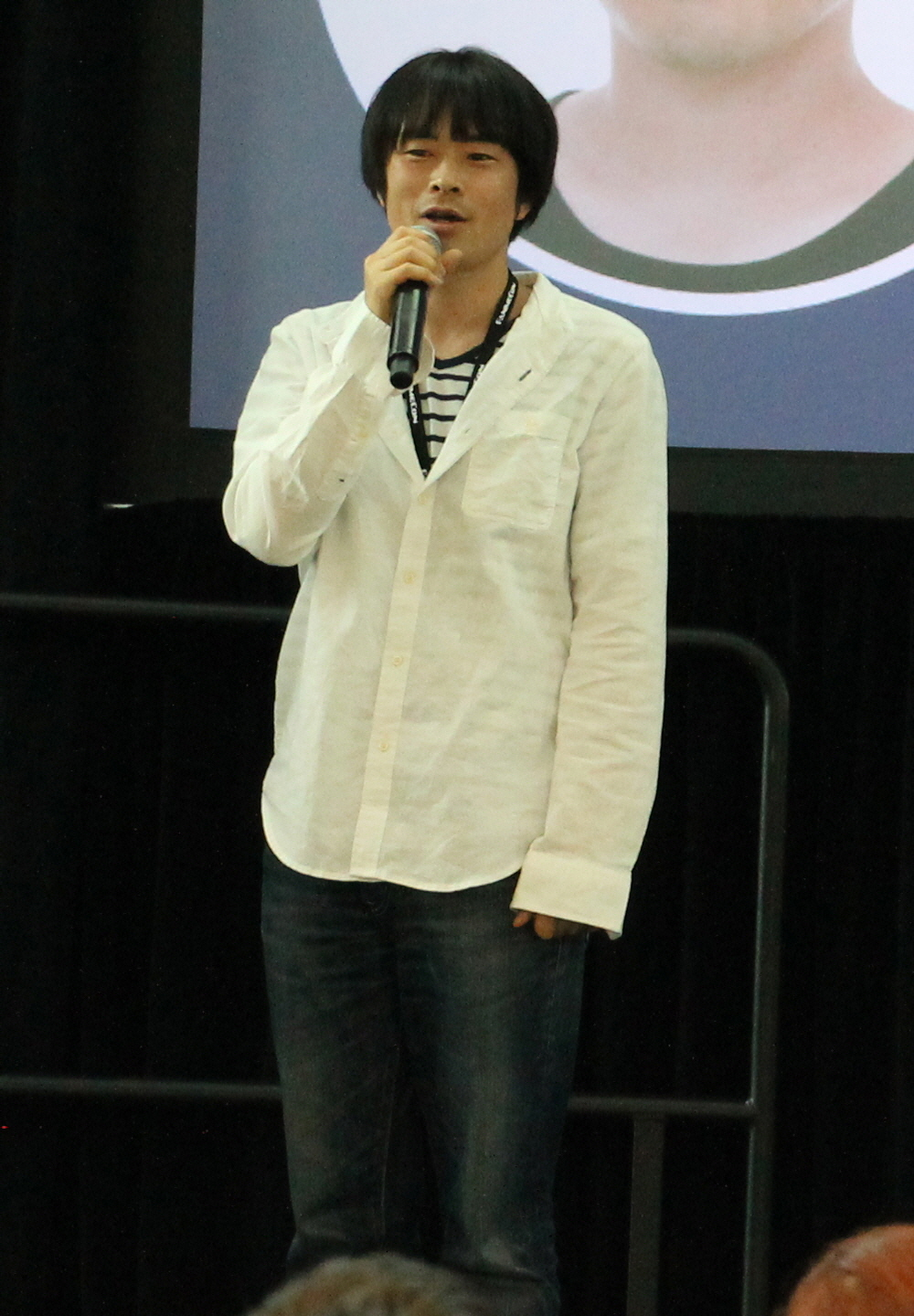
- Daisuke Sakaguchi at FanimeCon 2016
- Born: October 11, 1973 (age 52); Kashiwazaki, Niigata, Japan
- Occupation: Voice actor
- Years active: 1992–present
- Agent: Aoni Production
- Notable work: Mobile Suit Victory Gundam as Üso Ewin; Gintama as Shinpachi Shimura; Clannad as Youhei Sunohara; Blood Blockade Battlefront as Leonardo Watch; Hyouka as Satoshi Fukube; Guilty Crown as Souta Tamadate; God Eater as Kōta Fujiki; Atashinchi as Yuzuhiko Tachibana; Fire Force as Victor Licht; One Piece as Portgas D. Ace (Young); Dynasty Warriors 8 as Zhang Bao
- Height: 166 cm (5 ft 5 in)

Daisuke Sakaguchi (阪口 大助, Sakaguchi Daisuke; born October 11, 1973) is a Japanese voice actor, born in Kashiwazaki, Niigata. He is best known for his roles in Mobile Suit Victory Gundam as Üso Ewin, Gintama as Shinpachi Shimura, Clannad as Youhei Sunohara, Blood Blockade Battlefrontas Leonardo Watch, Paprika as Kei Himuro, Atashinchi as Yuzuhiko Tachibana, Hyouka as Satoshi Fukube, Guilty Crown as Souta Tamadate, Persona 5 as Yuki Mishima, Paranoia Agent as Lil' Slugger, Ragnarok The Animation as Roan, God Eater as Kōta Fujiki, and Fire Force as Viktor Licht.

He was a member of the voice actor unit E.M.U (Entertainment Music Unit) with fellow voice actors Hikaru Midorikawa, Hideo Ishikawa, Nobutoshi Hayashi, and Ryōtarō Okiayu.

== Filmography ==
=== Television animation ===
1992

- Sailor Moon (cat)

1993

- Mobile Suit Victory Gundam (Üso Ewin)
- Ghost Sweeper Mikami (Male Student)

1994

- Kiteretsu Daihyakka (Kiteretsu Sai (Young))
- Ginga Sengoku Gun'yūden Rai (Toramaru)
- Aoki Densetsu Shoot! (Kiyotaka Hirose)
- Captain Tsubasa J (Yuzo Morisaki)
- Marmalade Boy (Yamaguchi)

1995

- Kyōryū Bōkenki Jura Tripper (Beso)
- Sailor Moon S (Boy A, Young Man, MC)
- Sailor Moon SuperS (Kyuusuke Sarashina)
- Dragon Ball Z (Obake)
- World Fairy Tale Series (Much, Fritz)

1996

- Ganbarist! Shun (Shun Fujimaki)
- Sailor Moon SuperS Special (Dummy)
- Famous Dog Lassie (Billy Monaghan)

1997

- Crayon Shin-chan (Yoshirin Hatogaya)
- Cooking Master Boy (Tan Sanche)
- In The Beginning – The Bible Stories (Asaph)

1998

- Gakkyu-oh Yamazaki (Hikaru Butada)
- Kindaichi Shounen no Jikenbo (Channeler Sakuraba, Yōichi Takatō (Young))
- Nazca (Keita Seino/Amaro)
- Orphen (Killing Doll)
- Mamotte Shugogetten (Tasuke Shichiri)
- Yu-Gi-Oh! (Hamada Haiyama)
- Yoiko (Kenji Amimoto)
- Record of Lodoss War: Chronicles of the Heroic Knight (Marle)
- DT Eightron (Kyle)

1999

- The Big O (Jeff Meyers)
- Hoshin Engi (Taiitsu Shinjin)
- Shin Hakkenden (Abu)
- Burst Ball Barrage!! Super B-Daman (Shuji)

2000

- Ghost Stories (Reiichirou Miyanoshita (Young))

2001

- Shingu: Secret of the Stellar Wars (Jirō Narita)
- Super GALS! (Naoki Kuroi)
- PaRappa the Rapper (Jonathan the Police Dog)
- The Family's Defensive Alliance (Shoichi Masui)
- Beyblade (Giancarlo)
- Hajime no Ippo (Masahiko Umezawa, Naomichi Yamada)
- Magical Meow Meow Taruto (Geppei Ogaki)
- Sanrio Anime World Masterpiece Theater: Hello Kitty's The Little Match Girl (Dog Brother)
- Pocket Monsters Crystal: Raikou—Kaminari no Densetsu (Vincent)

2002

- Atashinchi (Yuzuhiko Tachibana)
- Soreike! Anpanman (Hamigakiman)
- Tokyo Mew Mew (Quiche)
- Heat Guy J (Claire Leonelli)
- Digimon Frontier (Trailmon)
- Daigunder (Susumu)
- Pokémon (Jackson)

2003

- Astro Boy (Butch, Maru-chan)
- Air Master (Reiichi Mishima)
- The Twelve Kingdoms (Hakuchi, Suguru Takasato)
- Tantei Gakuen Q (Masashi Tominaga)
- The World of Narue (Kazuto Iizuka)
- Pokémon Advance (Takeshi's Usohachi, Tom Pei)
- Bobobo-bo Bo-bobo (Halon Oni, Youngest Dynamite Brother)
- Maburaho (Kazuki Shikimori)
- Gad Guard (Arashi's brother)
- Human Crossing (Kiyoshi Kurata)
- Pocket Monsters: Side Stories (Tsutomu)

2004

- Agatha Christie no Meitantei Poirot to Marple (Alex Crackenthorpe)
- Mars Daybreak (Kato Takigawa, Jr.)
- Croquette! (Pirozhki)
- Hamtaro (Kitsune-san)
- Fullmetal Alchemist (Man A)
- Black Jack (Mitsuo)
- Paranoia Agent (Shonen Bat, Makoto Kozuka)
- Ragnarok The Animation (Roan)
- Rockman EXE Stream (TomahawkMan)
- Pocket Monsters: Side Stories (Caserin)
- Onmyō Taisenki (Hanmo no Ninkurou)
- Kaiketsu Zorori (Card kun A, Chipori)
- Sgt. Frog (Desk)
- Duel Masters Charge (Kuroyanagi)

2005

- Air (TV Hero)
- Aquarion (Jun Lee)
- Suki na Mono wa Suki Dakara Shouganai!! (Hiromu Sakura)
- Shinshaku Sengoku Eiyū Densetsu – Sanada Jū Yūshi The Animation (Chunagon Hideaki Kobayakawa)
- Tide-Line Blue (Keel)
- D.I.C.E. (Jet Siegel)
- Major (Tokashiki)
- MÄR (Jack)
- Rockman EXE Beast (TomahawkMan)
- One Piece (Rittonto)
- Pocket Monsters: Advanced Generation (Takeshi's Usohachi)

2006

- Welcome to the NHK (Kaoru Yamazaki)
- Gintama (Shinpachi Shimura, Kobayashi)
- Kiba (Ginga)
- .hack//Roots (Silabus)
- Bleach (Hou, Ban)
- Pocket Monsters: Diamond & Pearl (Hajime, Satoshi's Fukamaru, Takeshi's Usohachi/Usokkie, Kojirou's Masukippa)
- Rockman EXE Beast+ (TomahawkMan)
- Yomigaeru Sora – RESCUE WINGS (Kotaro Kumata, Takefumi Inoue)
- La Corda D'Oro ~primo passo~. (Yu Ogata)

2007

- Clannad (Youhei Sunohara)
- Gegege no Kitarō (Tofu-Kozou, Kinkichi, Kobayashi)
- Baccano! (Jacuzzi Splot)
- Bamboo Blade (Yūji Nakata)
- Bokurano (Takashi Waku)
- Mokke (Arita)
- Mononoke (Hyoue Sasaki)
- Moyashimon (Tadayasu Sawaki)
- Tokyo Majin Gakuen Kenpuchō: Tō (Ryoichi Karasawa)
- Pokémon Mystery Dungeon: Explorers of Time and Explorers of Darkness (Chatot)

2008

- Kamen no Maid Guy (Kōsuke Fujiwara)
- Clannad After Story (Youhei Sunohara)
- Linebarrels of Iron (Riku Ousei)
- Golgo 13 (Steve)
- Antique Bakery (Young Man A)
- The Telepathy Girl Ran (Yamashita)
- Sands of Destruction (Kumagoro)
- Hatara Kizzu Maihamu Gumi (Mezamachine)

2009

- Chrome Shelled Regios (Harley Sutton)
- Hell Girl: Three Vessels (Fumio Mizuhara)
- Doraemon (Pilon)
- Kaidan Restaurant (Hiroshi Itō, Reiko's brother)
- Sgt. Frog (Chief)
- Battle Spirits: Shōnen Gekiha Dan (Hideto Suzuri, Bodyguard 3)
- Hajime no Ippo: New Challenger (Hammer Nao/Naomichi Yamada)
- White Album (Akira Nanase)

2010

- Katanagatari (Chouchou Maniwa)
- Naruto Shippūden (Komushi, Samidare)
- Heartcatch Precure! (Hideo Saitani)
- One Piece (Portgas D. Ace (Young))
- Hime Chen! Otogi Chikku Idol Lilpri (Yuzukoji Kurimaro)

2011

- The Idolmaster (Host)
- Guilty Crown (Sōta Tamadate)
- Gintama' (Shinpachi Shimura, Teppei Sugihara)
- Sket Dance (Shinpachi Shimura, Teppei Sugihara)
- Chihayafuru (Futoshi Mochida)
- Battle Spirits: Brave (Hideto Suzuri)
- Detective Conan (Yoshinari Hashimoto)
- BB Senshi Sangokuden (Cao Pi Gundam)
- Digimon Fusion (Ignitemon, FlameWizardmon)

2012

- EUREKA SEVEN AO (Salesman)
- The Knight in the Area (Ichirō Yamanashi)
- Mobile Suit Gundam AGE (Max Hartway)
- Smile Precure! (Pop)
- Battle Spirits: Sword Eyes (Suō)
- Hyouka (Satoshi Fukube)
- Pretty Rhythm: Dear My Future (Yū Hirōmi)
- Moyashimon Returns (Tadayasu Sawaki)

2013

- Senyū. Dai 2 Ki (Juli)
- Tanken Driland (Evil Calvary God Seado, Kamikaze Kassim)
- Danball Senki Wars (Celede Chrysler)
- Chihayafuru 2 (Futoshi Mochida)
- Namiuchigiwa no Muromi-san (Giant Oarfish)
- Naruto Shippuden (Komushi)

2014

- Amagi Brilliant Park (Kimura)
- Kamigami no Asobi: Ludere deorum (Zeus Keraunos (child))
- Shōnen Hollywood – Holly Stage for 49 (Minoru Tomii)
- Hamatora (Yuuki Katsuragi)
- Hero Bank (Masahiro Mikeda)
- One Piece 3D2Y (Portgas D. Ace (Young))

2015

- Gintama° (Shinpachi Shimura)
- Amagi Brilliant Park (Kimura)
- Blood Blockade Battlefront (Leonardo Watch)
- God Eater (Kōta Fujiki)
- Shōnen Hollywood – Holly Stage for 50 (Minoru Tomii)
- Shin ATASHIn'CHI (Yuzuhiko Tachibana)
- Battle Spirits Burning Soul (Norihide Kongo)
- Pretty Guardian Sailor Moon Crystal Season II (Ittō Asanuma)
- One Piece: Episode of Sabo – 3 (Portgas D. Ace (Young))
- Danchi Tomoo (Yuto)
- World Trigger (Zeno)

2016

- Myriad Colors Phantom World (Shosuke Morohashi)
- Puzzle & Dragons X (Donny)
- Pretty Guardian Sailor Moon Crystal Season III (Ittō Asanuma)
- Digimon Universe: Appli Monsters (Hackmon, Watson Schneider)
- Summer Days with Coo (Crow, Onlookers)
- Dimension W (Harrison Eastriver)

2017

- Gintama (Shinpachi Shimura)
- Clean Freak! Aoyama kun (Jin Tsukamoto)
- Blood Blockade Battlefront & Beyond (Leonardo Watch)
- March Comes in Like a Lion (Okuyasu Yokomizo)
- Inuyashiki (Satoru Hamada)
- Knight's & Magic (Tsubasa Kurata)
- Time Bokan 24 (Sun Wukong)
- Kado: The Right Answer (Utamaru)

2018

- The Disastrous Life of Saiki K. (Shinpachi Shimura (cameo), Fudekichi Shiragami)
- Gintama. Shirogane no Tamashi-hen (Shinpachi Shimura)
- Touken Ranbu: Hanamaru (Fudō Yukimitsu)
- Persona 5: The Animation (Yuki Mishima)
- GeGeGe no Kitarō (Tarōmaru, Kojirō)
- Bakutsuri Bar Hunter (Tonpei Tachitsute)
- Mr. Tonegawa: Middle Management Blues (Keiichiro)
- Hoshi no Shima no Nyanko (Kotetsu)

2019

- JoJo's Bizarre Adventure: Golden Wind (Carne / Notorious B.I.G)
- RobiHachi (JPS-19)
- Midnight Occult Civil Servants (Shōta Shimizu)
- Fire Force (Victor Licht)
- Hi Score Girl (Mamezō)

2020

- If My Favorite Pop Idol Made It to the Budokan, I Would Die (Fujikawa)
- Fire Force (season 2) (Victor Licht)
- Genie Family 2020 (Tetsupan)

2021

- Ex-Arm (Beta)
- Motto! Majime ni Fumajime Kaiketsu Zorori (Gramo)
- Digimon Ghost Game (Kōtarō Nomura)
- Kaginado (Yōhei Sunohara)

2022

- Auto Boy – Carl from Mobile Land (Dorobon)
- Urusei Yatsura (Akira)
- Aoashi (Aki Tsukishima)
- Duel Masters WIN (Unchiku)
- Reincarnated as a Sword (Dungeon Master)

2023

- Synduality: Noir (Michael)
- You Were Experienced, I Was Not: Our Dating Story (Ren Nishina)

2024

- Run for Money: The Great Mission (Beaver, Tanuki)
- Touken Ranbu Kai: Kyoden Moyuru Honnōji (Fudō Yukimitsu)
- Blue Lock vs. U-20 Japan (Atsuto Tereasa)

2025

- Gintama: Mr. Ginpachi's Zany Class (Shinpachi Shimura)
- I Want to Escape from Princess Lessons (Dale)
- Blue Exorcist (Egyn)
- Mashin Creator Wataru (Tsukuyomi)
- New Saga (Carenas)
- A Wild Last Boss Appeared! (Kross)
- Tojima Wants to Be a Kamen Rider (Daisuke Satō)
- Nohara Hiroshi Hirumeshi no Ryūgi (Yoshirin (cameo))

2026

- Champignon Witch (Beast Magician)
- Digimon Beatbreak (Commandramon)
- Ojarumaru (June Beetle)

2027

- Gacha Girls Corps (Heihachi Okura)

=== Theatrical animation ===
1997

- Noiseman Sound Insect (Susumu)

1999

- Crayon Shin-chan: Explosion! The Hot Spring's Feel Good Final Battle (Yoshirin)

2000

- Crayon Shin-chan: Jungle That Invites Storm (Yoshirin)

2002

- A Tree of Palme (Shatta)
- 6 Angels(Akira Canyon)

2003

- Crayon Shin-chan: Fierceness That Invites Storm! Yakiniku Road of Honor (Yoshirin)
- Atashinchi the Movie (Yuzuhiko Tachibana)

2005

- Pokémon: Lucario and the Mystery of Mew (Weavile)
- Rockman EXE Hikari to Yami no Program (TomahawkMan)
- One Piece: Baron Omatsuri and the Secret Island (Rick)

2006

- Crayon Shin-chan: The Legend Called: Dance! Amigo! (Yoshirin)
- Pocket Monsters Advanced Generation the Movie – Pokémon Ranger and the Prince of the Sea: Manaphy (Tamanta, Buoysel)
- Paprika (2006) (Kei Himuro)

2007

- Genesis of Aquarion: Wings of Genesis (Jun Lee)
- Clannad The Movie (Youhei Sunohara)
- Pocket Monsters Diamond & Pearl the Movie – Dialga VS Palkia VS Darkrai (Takeshi's Usokkie, Tonio (young))
- Summer Days with Coo(Crow, Onlookers)

2008

- Tamagotchi: Happiest Story in the Universe! (Happy)
- Pocket Monsters Diamond & Pearl the Movie – Giratina and the Sky's Bouquet: Shaymin (Takeshi's Usokkie)

2009

- Space Battleship Yamato: Resurrection (Sho and So Tenma)
- Pocket Monsters Diamond & Pearl the Movie – Arceus: To a Conquering Spacetime (Takeshi's Usokkie)

2010

- Kaidan Restaurant (Pierre)
- Gintama The Movie: Shinyaku Benizakura-hen (Shinpachi Shimura)
- Pocket Monsters Diamond & Pearl the Movie – Supreme Ruler of Illusions: Zoroark (Takeshi's Usokkie, Kuruto's Bronzor)
- Atashinchi 3D (Yuzuhiko Tachibana)

2012

- Ashura (Kure)
- Crayon Shin-chan: Fierceness That Invites Storm! Me and the Space Princess (Yoshirin)
- the movie Kaikethu Zorori Da DA daibouken! (Zorondo's Android)

2013

- Pretty Cure All Stars New Stage 2: Friends of the Heart (Pop)
- Crayon Shin-chan: Very Tasty! B-class Gourmet Survival!!(Yoshirin)
- Gintama The Movie: The Final Chapter: Be Forever Yorozuya (Shinpachi Shimura)

2015

- Crayon Shin-chan: My Moving Story! Cactus Large Attack! (Yoshirin)

2016

- Crayon Shin-chan: Fast Asleep! The Great Assault on Dreamy World! (Yoshirin)
- Yowamushi Pedal Spare Bike (Shunsaku Itokawa)

2018

- Crayon Shin-chan: Burst Serving! Kung Fu Boys ~Ramen Rebellion~ (Yoshirin)

2019

- Bakutsuri Bar Hunter MSovie: Nazo no Barcode Trial! Bakutsure! Shinkaigyo Poseidon (Tonpei Tachtute)

2021

- Gintama The Final (Shinpachi Shimura)

2022

- Kaiketsu Zorori: Lalala♪ Star Tanjō (Chun-kun)

2023

- Pretty Guardian Sailor Moon Cosmos The Movie (Ittō Asanuma)
- Crayon Shin-chan The MOVIE (Yoshirin)

2026

- New Gintama Movie: Yoshiwara in Flames (Shinpachi Shimura)

=== OVA/ONA ===
1996

- Apocalypse Zero (Ponta Takada)
- Kekkon: Marriage (Mikimaro Shimura)

1999

- Sotsugyou M: Ore-tachi no Carnival (Mikimaro Shimura)

2000

- Denshin Mamotte Shugogetten (Tasuke Shichiri)

2002

- 6 Angels (Akira Canyon)
- Ichi the Killer 1 THE ANIMATION EPISODE 0 (Hirose)
- Psychic Academy (Ai Shiomi)

2003

- Submarine 707R (Senta Unno)

2004

- Great Yamato No. Zero (Tomtom)

2005

- Gintama jump festa 2005 (Shinpachi Shimura)

2007

- Genesis of Aquarion (Jun Lee)
- .hack // GU Returner (Silabus)
- Fist of the North Star 2: Legend of Yuria (Ryuga)

2009

- Tokimeki Memorial 4 Original Animation: Hajimari no Finder (Manabu Kobayashi)

2010

- Agukaru (Mellorine)

2011

- Supernatural: The Anime Series (Danny)
- VitaminX Addiction (Masaki Sanada)

2012

- Detective Conan: The Miracle of Excalibur (Fujio)

2013

- Transformers Go! (Hishoumaru)

2016

- Blood Blockade Battlefront (Leonardo Watch) (2 OVA 2016–2018)
- Gintama°: Love Incense Arc (Shinpachi Shimura)

2019

- 7SEEDS (Sakuya Yamaki)
- Battle Spirits Saga Brave (Hideto Suzuri)
- Gintama: Monster Strike-hen (Shinpachi Shimura)

2021

- Gintama: The Semi-final (Shinpachi Shimura)
- Aoi hane mituketa! (thumi)

2023

- Elemon (Aquro)

2026

- Dandelion (Raymond Honda)

=== Mobile games ===
2016

- Touken Ranbu (Fudo Yukimitsu)
- Record of Lodoss War Online (Eto)

2018

- Granblue Fantasy (Rintaro, Shinpachi Shimura)
- Star Ocean: Anamnesis (Ashton Anchors, Noel Chandler)

2019

- Langrisser Mobile (Hain)

2020

- Pokémon Masters EX (Clemont)
- Shadowverse
- Sdorica (Clark)

2021

- Puyopuyo!! Quest (Shimura Shinpachi)

2022

- Your Majesty (Jikkyo)

2023

- Girl Friend Beta (waruBboy)
- Live a hero (Yohack)

2024

- Arknights (Bryophyta)

=== Video games ===
- .hack//G.U. (Silabus)
- Airforce Delta Strike (Pierre Gallo)
- Atelier Annie: Alchemists of Sera Island (Kyle Eugrald)
- Battle Arena Toshinden (Fang)
- Battle Fantasia (Cedric Ward)
- Bouken Katsugeki Mono Mono (Gen)
- Cosmic Break (Jikun Hu, Hot Blooded Hero)
- CV: Casting Voice (Toru Saotome)
- Dragon Ball Heroes (Saiyan Avatar [Elite Type])
- Dynasty Warriors 8 (Zhang Bao)
- Gintama DS: Yorozuya Riot (Shinpachi Shimura)
- Gintama: Gintoki vs. Hijikata!? The Kabuki District Silver Ball Competition!! (Shinpachi Shimura)
- Gintama Rumble (Shinpachi Shimura)
- Gintama: Silver Ball Quest: Gin-san Changes His Job and Saves the World (Shinpachi Shimura)
- Gintama Sugoroku (Shinpachi Shimura)
- Gintama: With Gin-san! My Kabuki District Diary (Shinpachi Shimura)
- Gintama: Yorozuya Tu~be! Tsukkomable Video (Shinpachi Shimura)
- God Eater series (Kouta Fujiki)
- Gunparade March (Daisuke Akane)
- JEWEL GARDEN (Ruby)
- JoJo's Bizarre Adventure: Phantom Blood (Poco)
- J-Stars Victory Vs (Shinpachi Shimura)
- Kessen (Tokugawa Hidetada)
- Keriotosse! (Shade)
- Lunar: Silver Star Story (Nash)
- Mobile Suit Gundam: Gundam vs. Gundam (Üso Ewin)
- Money Puzzle Exchanger (Bill Bank / Coquetrybouncer)
- Ore no Shita de Agake (Shin Shimizu)
- Persona 5 (Yuki Mishima)
- Puyo Puyo! 15th Anniversary (Nasu Grave)
- Soshite Bokura Wa, (Koki Kurisu)
- SpellDown, (Yousuke Ohtani)
- Star Fox 64 (NUS, Andrew Oikonny, Bill Grey)
- Star Ocean: The Second Story (Ashton Anchors and Noel Chandler)
- Super Dragon Ball Heroes World Mission (Saiyan elite type)
- Super Robot Wars X-Ω (Uso Ewin)
- Super Smash Bros. Brawl (Usohachi)
- Tales of Symphonia (Gnome)
- Tales of the World: Radiant Mythology (Mormo)
- Tokimeki Memorial 4 (Manabu Kobayashi)
- Tokyo Mew Mew – Enter the New Mew Mew! – Serve Everyone Together (Quiche)
- Tomoyo After: It's a Wonderful Life (Youhei Sunohara)
- True Love Story 2 (Kenta Kazama)
- Valkyrie Profile: Lenneth (Rouly)
- VitaminR (Marco Lagrange)
- VitaminX Evolution (Masaki Sanada)
- Xenoblade Chronicles X (Tatsu)

=== Tokusatsu ===
- Moero!! Robocon (1999) (Robokero)
- Hyakujuu Sentai Gaoranger (2001) (Human body Specimen Org) (ep. 21)
- Ressha Sentai ToQger (2014) (Keeper Knight) (ep. 37)
- Kikai Sentai Zenkaiger (2021) (Omikuji Wald) (ep. 45)
- Ohsama Sentai King-Ohger (2023) (Zarigajim) (ep. 24)
- Bakuage Sentai Boonboomger (2024) (Senro Grumer) (ep. 32)

=== Drama CDs ===
- Abunai series 3: Abunai Bara to Yuri no Sono
- Abunai series 4: Abunai Campus Love (Yuu Kasai)
- Aitsu no Daihonmei (Yoshio Yoshida)
- AGNOIA Drama CD II–III (Akira Kazusa)
- Akatsuki-tei Monogatari (Loic)
- Cutie Angel (Yoze)
- Nijuurasen series (Yuuta Shinomiya)
- Oujisama no Obenkyou (Yuu)
- Ourin Gakuen series 2: Ai no Sainou (Junya Shiraishi)
- Princess Princess (Akira Sakamoto)
- True Love Story Vol.2 (Keiichi Hasegawa)
- Valkyrie Profile Voice Mix Arrange (Fuyuki)

=== Japanese Voice-Over ===
- Splash Mountain (Br'er Vulture 2) -->

=== Live-action roles ===
- Death Note: New Generation (2016) (voice of Near)

=== Dubbing roles ===
==== Live-action ====
- American Reunion, Kevin Myers (Thomas Ian Nicholas)
- Baywatch Season 6, Conner
- Beethoven's 5th, Garrett (Sammy Kahn)
- Dykkerne, Ask (Ralf J. Hollander)
- Free Willy, Perry (Michael Bacall)
- Free Willy 2, Jesse (Jason James Richter)
- Funky Monkey, Michael Dean (Seth Adkins)
- Growing Pains, Luke Brower (Leonardo Dicaprio)
- Halloween H20: 20 Years Later, Charlie Deveraux (Adam Hann-Byrd)
- Home Alone, Jeff McAllistor (Michael C. Maronna)
- H_{2}O: Just Add Water (Lewis McCartney)
- Malèna, Renato Amoroso (Giuseppe Sulfaro)
- Prayer of the Rollerboys, Miltie (Devin Clark)
- Shazam!, Freddy Freeman (Jack Dylan Grazer)
- Shazam! Fury of the Gods, Freddy Freeman (Jack Dylan Grazer)
- Superbad, Fogell / McLovin (Christopher Mintz-Plasse)
- Unaccompanied Minors, Spencer Davenport (Dyllan Christopher)

==== Animation ====
- Babar (TV series) (Young Arthur)
- Dragon Tales (1999-2006) (Zak)
- Drawn Together (2004-2007) (Xandir P. Wifflebottom)
- Elliot Moose (1999-2000) (Elliot)
- Sabrina: The Animated Series (Harvey Kinkle)
- Shirt Tales (Figby from "Figby the Spoiled Brat Cat")
- South Park (Stan Marsh (FOX dub) (Trey Parker))
- Teen Titans (Larry/Nosyarg Kcid (Dee Bradley Baker))
