= Gintama: The Movie: The Final Chapter: Be Forever Yorozuya =

2013 Japanese animated film

- Theatrical release poster
- Directed by: Yoichi Fujita
- Screenplay by: Akatsuki Yamatoya
- Story by: Hideaki Sorachi
- Based on: Gin Tama by Hideaki Sorachi
- Produced by: Susumu Hieda; Yasuyuki Ban; Hiromitsu Higuchi
- Starring: Tomokazu Sugita; Daisuke Sakaguchi; Rie Kugimiya; Susumu Chiba; Kazuya Nakai; Kenichi Suzumura; Akira Ishida; Kōichi Yamadera
- Cinematography: Ei Rouhei
- Edited by: Takeshi Seyama
- Music by: Audio Highs
- Production company: Sunrise
- Distributed by: Warner Bros. Pictures
- Release date: July 6, 2013 (Japan)
- Running time: 110 minutes
- Country: Japan
- Language: Japanese
- Box office: ¥1.7 billion (Japan)

Gintama: The Movie: The Final Chapter: Be Forever Yorozuya (劇場版 銀魂 完結篇 万事屋よ永遠なれ, Gekijōban Gintama Kanketsu-hen: Yorozuya yo Eien Nare) is a 2013 Japanese animated film produced by Sunrise based on the Gintama manga and anime series. It was directed by the director from the anime series Yoichi Fujita and based on a story by Hideaki Sorachi, Gintama's original author. It stars Tomokazu Sugita, Daisuke Sakaguchi, Rie Kugimiya among others. The film focuses on the freelancer samurai Gintoki Sakata in a time travelling story where he encounters older personas of the people he met in Edo.

The Final Chapter was first announced August 2012 although major details were not released until early 2013. Although the film has been marketed as "Final Chapter" Sorachi and Fujita did not confirm it was the last anime production from Gintama; the former wrote the story with the concept of the series' ending. Two themes were provided by the bands Spyair and Tommy heavenly6, with latter's song having already been used in the television series.

== Plot ==
While working in a cinema, Gintoki comes upon a "movie thief" (a figure in Japanese culture often depicted as a man with a video camera as a head, stand in as someone who illegally film in cinemas). After scolding the movie thief for his actions, he finds himself warped into another world via the camera lens. In this world, 5 years have passed, and not only has the land of Edo changed into an apocalyptic wasteland, but it is stated Gintoki has died. The movie thief, or Time Thief the time machine, explains mankind is close to extinction, and gives Gintoki an item to disguise himself. After the Time Thief is damaged by criminals, Gintoki encounters his freelancer comrades: Shinpachi Shimura, who has turned into a cool samurai with no trace of tsukkomi, and Kagura, who has changed into a beautiful woman with no Chinese speech pattern. The future's Gintoki is assumed to have died as a result of the "White Curse". Kagura and Shinpachi have been trying to deal with their leader's disappearance and Gintoki, disguised thanks to the Time Thief, tries to help them overcome their sadness.

Gintoki, Kagura and Shinpachi go to the execution of the Shinsengumi leader Isao Kondo, Joi terrorist Kotaro Katsura and mechanic Gengai Hiraga. Kondo and Katsura are saved by their underlings Sogo Okita, Toshiro Hijikata and Elizabeth who have joined forces to form a new group opposing the bakufu while Gengai is revealed to be an imposter. Interacting with the new group Gintoki learns the White Curse was started by a group of sorcerers known as Enmi (厭魅) who Gintoki's Joi faction fought in a previous war. Gintoki was infected with a virus which had undergone an incubation period and the future's Gintoki disappeared while fighting it. One victim of the White Curse is Shinpachi's sister, Tae, who is close to her death. In order to cure her, Gintoki's friends go to search for the Emmi. Gintoki finds and kills the Emmi who is revealed to be the future's Gintoki who set this series of events off to be killed by his past self.

Despite the death of the future Gintoki, the White Curse does not stop. Gintoki used the repaired Time Thief to go back to the past and kill his past self from the war, the White Demon, before the virus goes into incubation. However, the White Demon is actually Taizo Hasegawa in disguise. It is revealed that Tama is the Time Thief who was used by the people from the future to stop Gintoki from erasing his existence and help him defeat the Emmi before the curse starts. Together with his friends and the last generation of the old Jouishi (Katsura, Takasugi, Sakamoto, and the white demon otherwise known as the Gintoki from the past) fight against the Emmi. Finally, Gintoki and the white demon defeat the Emmi, stopping them from starting the curse. Gintoki reunites with the Yorozuya and then him and his friends return to their own timeline, all promising to meet again. The ending scene consists of the original members of the Jōi watching from a cliff. At the end of the story, after the credits end, it shows that Gintoki, Shinpachi, and Kagura meeting together even after the past is changed.

== Cast ==
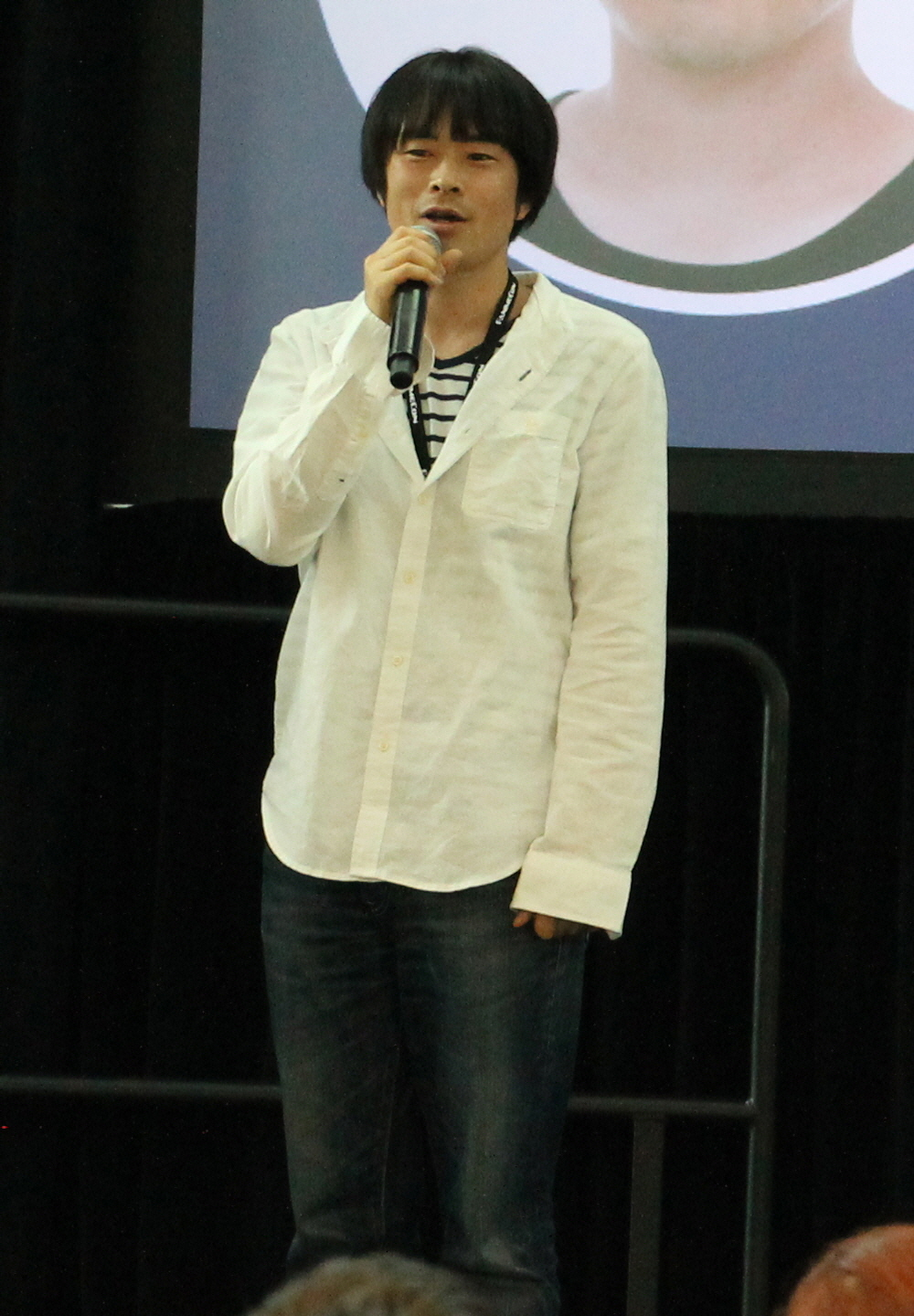
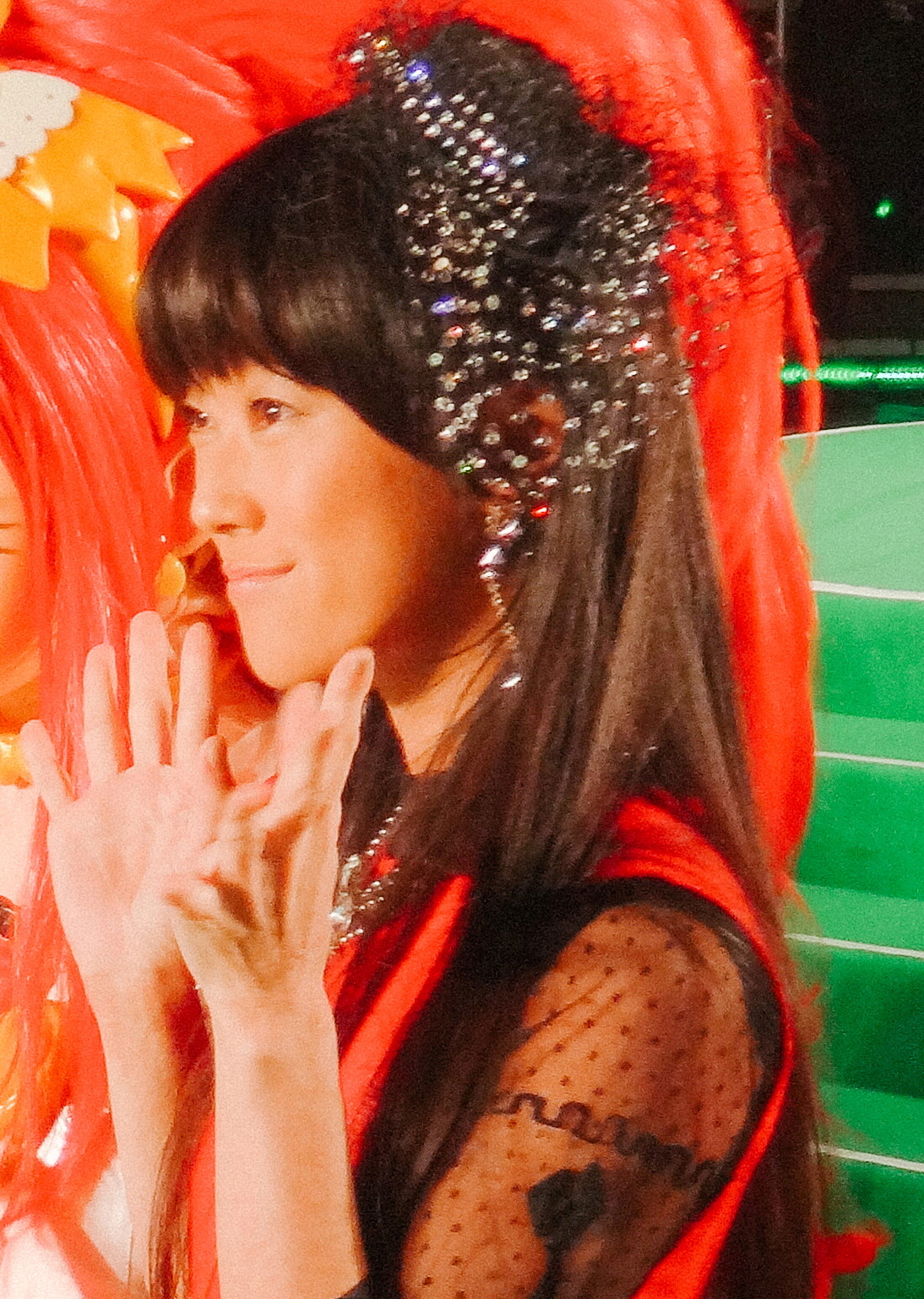
Daisuke Sakaguchi (left) and Rie Kugimiya expressed difficulties with their alternative incarnations of Shinpachi and Kagura, respectively.

The cast from the TV series returned to voice the characters with:

- Tomokazu Sugita as Gintoki Sakata. A freelancer samurai travelling across time to find the source of the virus. Sugita expressed satisfaction with the script.
- Daisuke Sakaguchi as Shinpachi Shimura. Gintoki's apprentice of samurai who has grown into a skilled warrior in the future. Sakaguchi found it felt like the story fitted the series. Due to Shinpachi's portrayal as a stronger character, Sakaguchi commented it was difficult voicing him for the movie.
- Rie Kugimiya as Kagura. A young girl who grew into a quite skilled fighter in the future. Kugimiya shared similar feelings about her work as the older Kagura based on her calm dialogue despite sharing several traits from her common persona.
- Mikako Takahashi as Sadaharu / Otsuu-chan
- Susumu Chiba as Isao Kondo
- Kazuya Nakai as Toshiro Hijikata
- Kenichi Suzumura as Sogo Okita
- Tetsuharu Ōta as Sagaru Yamazaki
- Akira Ishida as Kotaro Katsura
- Satsuki Yukino as Tae Shimura
- Fumiko Orikasa as Kyubei Yagyu
- Yū Kobayashi as Ayame "Sacchan" Sarutobi
- Yūko Kaida as Tsukuyo
- Kujira as Otose
- Omi Minami as Tama
- Yū Sugimoto as Catherine
- Fumihiko Tachiki as Taizo Hasegawa
- Bin Shimada as Gengai Hiraga
- Kōji Yusa as Ayumu Tojo
- Kōichi Sakaguchi as Musashi-Like Man
- Takehito Koyasu as Shinsuke Takasugi
- Shinichirō Miki as Tatsuma Sakamoto
- Akira Kamiya as Future Elizabeth
- Tsutomu Isobe as Emmi
- Kōichi Yamadera as Time Bandit

== Production ==
The movie was announced in August 2012 in Shueisha's Weekly Shonen Jump magazine where the manga was published. The announcement came alongside the confirmation the story was being written by Hideaki Sorachi. The television series used to show part of its logo until revealing the full title during March 2013. Although it was titled "Final Chapter", Sorachi said the manga series was not ending and he believed it could refer to the film being Sunrise's last production based on the series. Having been told by Sunrise about the film's title and material, Sorachi wrote a story that could be considered the end of the series. Additionally, director Yoichi Fujita commented they would make a continuation if it became a hit.

=== Music ===
The film uses two musical themes: the insert theme "Genjō Destruction" (現状ディストラクション; lit. 'Present state Destruction') by Spyair and the ending theme "Pray" by Tommy heavenly6. While "Pray" was previously used as the series' first opening theme, "Genjō Destruction" was composed for this movie and its single was released on July 3, 2013. Spyair had previously contributed with two other themes for the TV series. Spyair read the script of the movie and later had a talk with Fujita in order to get an idea for "Genjō Destruction." They learned the theme was going to be used in a fight scene and thus worked to compose a high quality song in order to make it match with the movie. A twenty-three theme CD soundtrack was released on July 3, 2013, by Aniplex.

=== Changes ===
The Anime Book for the 2nd Gintama movie had a bonus part where it showed off the storyboards of the original version of movie 2 where there were 3 additional scenes that were cut from the final version. These scenes include: all the future versions of the Gintama characters, with the exception of Gintoki, Tae, and the ones who don't feature in the film having dialog. A conversation with Gintoki and Gengai after Gintoki met his future self, and the most important one, a cut scene that would have explained how the memories of Gintoki came back to the others, with Tama, having saved pictures of Gintoki and using it to show everyone around giving them back the memories of Gintoki. Additionally, there were two further changes made, a different version of the opening and a different version of how Gintoki and Future Gintoki talk would have gone down.

== Release ==
In December 2012 at Jump Festa the cast from the Gintama anime series commented they were not sure when the film was going to be released due to delays from the script. The delay to Summer 2013 was confirmed in January 2013 in an episode from the TV series. An anime event titled "Soul of Silver" was made to promote the movie in Osaka. The DVD featuring videos and interviews from event was released on October 23, 2013. A novelization of the film by Ohsaki Tomohito was released by Shueisha on July 8, 2013.

The film premiered in theaters on July 6, 2013. A preopening was made at Ryogoku Kokugikan on June 29, 2013, with a fan event featuring appearances by the voice actors from the series. Movie goers can buy special flavored popcorn representing the characters of Gintoki Sakata, Kagura and Toshiro Hijikata. Additionally, all of them are given notepads with "Volume 0-style" cover made by Hideaki Sorachi.

=== Box office and sales ===
The movie debuted in the Japanese box office fourth earning ¥281,776,256 (US$2,821,707) on 127 screens. Oricon reported in August 2013 that it sold over one million tickets surpassing the ticket sales from the previous Gin Tama film. By the end of 2013, the film grossed ¥1.7 billion ($17.42 million) at the Japanese box office.

It was released in DVD and Blu-ray format on December 18, 2013, by Aniplex. The two are available in both regular and limited editions, the latter including a bonus extra CD. A week after its release, the Blu-ray sold 38,783 units in Japan, while in mid-January 2014 it reached a total of 44,778 units sold.
