= Kyousougiga =

Japanese original net animation (ONA) and TV series

- Promotional image featuring, counter clockwise, the protagonist, Koto, Inuyama the dog, Head priest Yakushimaru, Kurama, Shoko, A and Un, Yase and her posse, and Lady Koto

京騒戯画
- Genre: Action, fantasy
- Created by: Izumi Todo
- Original net animation
- Directed by: Rie Matsumoto
- Written by: Izumi Todo
- Music by: Hiroshi Takaki
- Studio: Toei Animation
- Licensed by: NA: Discotek Media
- Released: December 6, 2011
- Runtime: 26 minutes
- Manga
- Written by: Izumi Todo
- Illustrated by: Mercre
- Published by: ASCII Media Works
- Magazine: Dengeki Maoh
- Original run: December 27, 2011 – January 27, 2014
- Volumes: 2
- Original net animation
- Directed by: Rie Matsumoto
- Written by: Izumi Todo
- Music by: Go Shiina
- Studio: Toei Animation
- Licensed by: NA: Discotek Media
- Released: August 31, 2012 – December 22, 2012
- Runtime: 7–12 minutes
- Episodes: 5
- Anime television series
- Directed by: Rie Matsumoto
- Written by: Rie Matsumoto; Izumi Todo
- Music by: Go Shiina
- Studio: Toei Animation
- Licensed by: NA: Discotek Media
- Original network: Tokyo MX, BS Asahi
- Original run: October 2, 2013 – December 25, 2013
- Episodes: 10 + 3 extras
- icon

Kyousougiga (京騒戯画, Kyōsōgiga; lit. "Capital Craze Caricature") is a Japanese original net animation (ONA) series created by Izumi Todo and produced by Toei Animation in collaboration with Banpresto. The animation was released on Nico Nico Douga and YouTube in December 2011. Five additional episodes were streamed between August and December 2012. An anime television series aired between October and December 2013.

== Plot ==
Long ago, high priest Myōe had the ability to make anything he drew come to life. This ability scared the villagers of his town, and made him an outcast. In his mountain home he drew a variety of things, not least of which was a surreal town called Kyoto (鏡都; lit. Mirror Capital). One of his drawings, a rabbit named Koto, whom he drew as the God of the Mirror Capital, came to life upon striking a deal with a Bodhisattva. Lady Koto managed to win the love of Myōe. After finding a war orphan, Yakushimaru, and taking him under their wing as an adoptive child, the family dimension hop to Kyoto for a better life. Myōe draws two siblings for Yakushimaru, one named Yase and the other Kurama. The five of them live happily together until Lady Koto, having fulfilled her end of the deal with the Bodhisattva, has to be taken away. With their time as a family at its end, Myōe leaves Yakushimaru the title of high priest and his prayer beads, telling him that he will return with the beginning and the end in tow.

Years later, Yakushimaru runs Kyoto as part of the Council of Three with Yase and Kurama as they await the return of their mother and father. A girl named Koto, who resembles both Myōe and Lady Koto, finds her way into Kyoto, a feat never before achieved. Koto spends her days in Kyoto living with Myōe, searching for a way to return home and clues about her own family. Kurama eventually hatches a plan with the use of the adamantine giant Bishimaru and Koto to force open the gate leading to Kyoto, allowing Lady Koto to return. Her return however threatens to destroy the entire multiverse, and draws the negative attention of the Shrine, a mysterious organization that acts to keep the peace of the multiverse.

== Characters ==
Koto (コト)
Voiced by: Rie Kugimiya
The main protagonist, a 14-year-old girl who fights with a variable size hammer, named Aratama (荒魂). Koto is a carefree and hyperactive girl who is searching for a black rabbit in order to return home with her familiars, while also searching for clues that will reunite her with her family. She spent her childhood as a student in the Shrine, and is very adept at combat.
A (阿) and Un (吽)
Voiced by: Noriko Hidaka (A), Ryoko Shiraishi (Un)
A and Un are two brothers who are Koto's familiars whom she inherited from her master. Their name means 'the beginning' and 'the end', respectively. Koto refers to both of them as "Ah-un". A, like Koto, is hyperactive, while Un, on the other hand, is much more reserved. They both appear as chibi middle school students, but can transform into red and blue monsters who can fly and possess supernatural strength. They both wear black blazers over red hoodies, black pants and black shoes.
Myōe (明恵) / Yakushimaru (薬師丸)
Voiced by: Kenichi Suzumura, Chiwa Saito (young)
A young but grumpy Buddhist monk who looks after Koto and her familiars while waiting for his adopted father and mother, the original Myōe and Lady Koto, to return. He is one of the members of the Council of Three. Before the original Myōe had left and granted him the title of Myōe, his name was Yakushimaru. Yakushimaru had committed suicide upon the death of his family when the original Myōe found him. Determined to make Yakushimaru a part of their family, the original Myōe drew him a pomegranate that revived and bestowed him with immortality, and siblings, Yase and Kurama, to make him feel better. However, after his parents left, Myōe became detached from his new life and responsibilities, and his sole wish became to finally die. He uses the prayer beads his father had given him alongside the title of Myōe to fight.
Yase (八瀬)
Voiced by: Eri Kitamura
An oni who often hosts tea parties at her estate in the forbidden zone outside of the city. Though generally having the appearance of a polite, refined and very wealthy young lady, she will shape shift into a raging monster if she becomes irritated. Yase is one of the members of the Council of Three. She is originally a drawing by the original Myōe. She adores her mother Lady Koto, and awaits her return.
Kurama (鞍馬)
Voiced by: Shigeru Nakahara, Ryoko Shiraishi (young)
An elderly looking Buddha who is usually seen levitating on a large sake saucer. Kurama carries out most administrative duties in Kyoto. As a child Kurama wished to see the world outside of Kyoto, but Myōe, knowing how humans might treat Kurama, forbade it. For this reason Kurama actively seeks to find a way out of Kyoto. Kurama is Shōko's boss and one of the members of the Council of Three. He is originally a drawing by the original Myōe.
Professor Shōko (ショーコ博士, Shōko Hakase)
Voiced by: Chiwa Saitō
A young girl who wears goggles and a white lab coat. She works under Kurama and is in charge of safekeeping Bishamaru, the adamant giant. Shōko is head of Kyoto's forces, who are all drone like men who wear white suits and resemble mafia. She is cocky and often uses her authority in large and obstructive ways, such as mobilizing her entire force and blockading much of Kyoto to find the replaceable controller for Bishamaru. Shōko also dislikes Koto, or anyone who disrespects her authority, or touches anything of hers.
Fushimi (伏見)
Voiced by: Eiji Takemoto
Shoko's assistant. Fushimi frequently puts up with Shōko's antics, but is secretly amused by them. He is also a close friend and confidant of Kurama. Although he works for Kurama, he is related to the Shrine in some way.
Myōe (明恵) / Inari (稲荷)
Voiced by: Akira Ishida
A priest with the strange ability to make anything he draws come to life. Myōe is a caring man, but was ostracized by the villagers for his supernatural powers. Myōe moves into the mountains and eventually into the Looking Glass City before he has to leave his family. After Myōe leaves Kyoto, he relinquishes his title to Yakushimaru, and later becomes Inari. Inari has the appearance of a younger Myōe, and wears a fox mask and carries a katana. After Koto is born, Lady Koto had given her all her strength as a Bodhisattva, and as a result, she is unable to sustain herself well on different planes. Inari is forced to take care of Koto alone, and teaches and guides her as she grows. Although Myōe loves his family dearly, he has little love for himself, and hopes to eventually disappear. He later identifies himself as "God" given that he can create entire worlds, reveals that his brother is the High Priest, and that their father was previously acting as God as well. What he means is not that he is God, but to the denizens of the worlds he creates, he might as well be and because he recognized he was human and imperfect, he felt the responsibility was too great.
Lady Koto (古都, Koto)
Voiced by: Aya Hisakawa
A black rabbit born from the original Myōe's drawings who fell in love with him and accepted the offer of a female Bodhisattva to lend her a human body in order to confess her feelings for him. She then lived with Myōe and adopted Yakushimaru. She also took Yase and Kurama as her children and together, they moved to the Looking Glass City. Koto eventually has to be confined to a desolate moon because she cannot sustain her presence anywhere else very well after her daughter Koto inherits all her powers.

== Media ==
=== Anime ===
Kyousougiga was created by Toei Animation's Izumi Todo writing staff and was directed by Rie Matsumoto. The animation was released on Nico Nico Douga on December 6, 2011, followed by a release on YouTube on December 10 of that same year. Five additional episodes were streamed between August 31 and December 22, 2012. An anime television series began airing from October 2 to December 25, 2013, The series is named after the Chōjū-giga scrolls. consisting a total of 13 episodes: 10 regular, 2 summary and 1 special episode. The ONA and television series has been licensed by Discotek Media, and was released sub-only on Blu-ray + DVD Combo Pack on February 28, 2017. The Blu-ray has the ONA series, the DVD does not.

=== Manga ===
The original ONA series was adapted as a two-volume manga illustrated by Mercre and serialized in ASCII Media Works' Dengeki Maoh magazine from February 2012 to March 2014 issues. Another manga adaptation following the TV series was serialized from November 2013 to March 2014 issues. Both manga were drawn by Mercre.

=== Video games ===
Koto and Yase appear as playable characters in the crossover strategy game, Super Heroine Chronicle, for PlayStation 3 and PlayStation Vita.
