= Leonardo Watch =

- Blood Blockade Battlefront character
- Leonardo Watch alongside Sonic as illustrated by Yasuhiro Nightow
- First appearance: Chapter 1: "Those Shrouded In Fog" (2009)
- Created by: Yasuhiro Nightow
- Voiced by: Japanese; Daisuke Sakaguchi; Ryōta Ōsaka (Vomic); English; Aaron Dismuke

In-universe information
- Relatives: Michella Watch (sister)

Leonardo Watch (Japanese: レオナルド・ウォッチ, Hepburn: Reonarudo Wotchi) is a fictional character from Yasuhiro Nightow's manga and anime series Blood Blockade Battlefront. Leonardo is a kind and humble young photographer who came to alien Hellsalem's Lot to help his ailing sister. An unknown entity gave him the "All Seeing Eyes of the Gods" (神々の義眼, Kamigami no Gigan), granting him a variety of powerful ocular powers, at the cost of his sister's sight. In order to provide for his sister, Leonardo finds a new job as member of the Libra Organization who are to clear the streets of trouble and prevent the horrors of this city from spreading to the outside world. He is voiced by Ryōta Ōsaka in the vcomic, Daisuke Sakaguchi in the anime series and Aaron Dismuke in the English dub.

Nightow created Leonardo with the idea of him being a normal observant of a clash between supernatural heroes, with Marvel Comics Spider-Man's civilian side being a major basis. Leonardo has earned mixed responses in regards to his characterization by publications for manga, anime and other media for his constant need of help and weakness in general when compared to the members from Libra. Nevertheless, his relationship with White and Black during the climax of the first anime as well his how his relationship with them is portrayed earned positive response.

== Creation and design ==
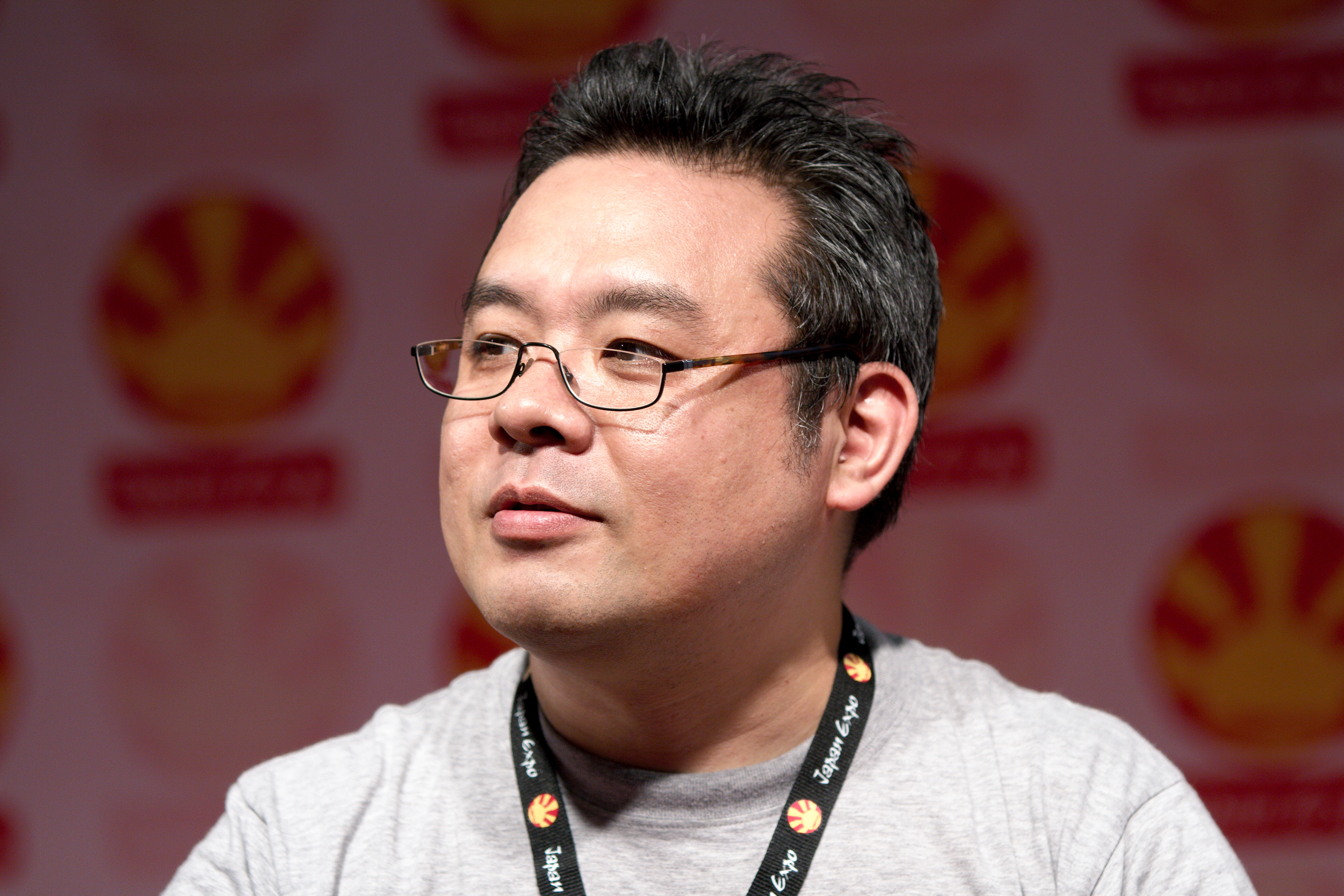
Yasuhiro Nightow created Leonardo Watch.

Leonardo Watch was created by manga author Yasuhiro Nightow. When asked if he were to "summarise Leo with one sentence, he is "the one who sees'". Nightow claimed that the one who get role to "watch" Hellsalem's Lot with the perspective of an ordinary citizen, which inspired his last name, Watch. In a further analysis he claims it is important role for the place a place that has many abnormal person and things. His characterization as self-proclaimed as reporter, that character role was inspired by Sam Raimi's character Peter Parker from the 2002 film Spider-Man.

Anime director Rie Matsumoto found issues with adapting the Blood Blockade Battlefront manga due to its narrative lacking an overreaching structure. As a result, she used Leonardo's and Michella's relationship as a basis in the first anime adaptation. This led to the creation of the siblings White and Black who would meet Leonardo as friends and in the climax they are involved in a conflict. Manga artist Yasuhiro Nightow give his approval when heard of this storyline.

The character is voiced by Ryōta Ōsaka in the vcomic, Daisuke Sakaguchi in the anime series and Aaron Dismuke in the English dub. Sakaguchi recalls being excited when learning of role of a Leonardo due to how attractive is the city from Blood Blockade Battlefront. Owing to his character having multiple lines, Sakaguchi noted his work was challenging and thus wanted to give and outstanding performance. He compared Leonardo with the viewer in the way the story told to both of them and thus found interesting this work. He further commented that while the series might be solid, there are some comical scenes that he wanted to appeal to the audience.

== Appearances ==
=== In Blood Blockade Battlefront ===
Leonardo Watch is a young man whose special power, the "All Seeing Eyes" catches the attention of Libra, a special organization that enforces order on Hellsalem's Lot, a region of New York where all sort of supernatural beings coexist with humans. Upon entering the Lot, Leonardo tries to find Libra but loses his camera which is stolen by a monkey. Leonardo then hears of a terrorist attack and discovers through the All Seeing Eyes that the monkey carried the bomb. Once he deactivates the bomb, Leonardo becomes a member of Libra. He pets the monkey, naming it Sonic. He starts working with the group to provide for his sister.

Throughout the series, Leonardo meets multiple citizens and befriends his colleagues from Libra, Leonardo learns Michella is getting married and she wants him to see her future husband. Despite being initially glad that her sister is getting married, Leo is taken for a loop when he discovers the groom has a dangerous secret of his own; one directly connected to the All-Seeing Eyes of the Gods. With his sister being held hostage, and no backup from Libra, Leonardo has no choice but to follow Dr. Gamimozu's orders. Leo uses his intelligence and perseverance to distract Dr. Gamimozu long enough for Libra to save them. Upon recovery, Klaus tells the wounded Leonardo that he has become a stronger man ever since he joined Libra and has made him proud.

=== In the anime adaptation ===
In the anime series, Leonardo meets and befriends White, an enigmatic girl whom he often visits in a hospital from Lot. White's brother, Black, is controlled by the spirit of an entity known as the King of Despair uses the power of Leo's eyes to ignite a huge catastrophe on Hellsalem's Lot during Halloween. Upon seeing the chaos the King of Despair has caused, Leonardo travels across the city constantly being aided by the members from Libra in order to reach the siblings. Upon reaching the King of Despair, Leonardo sees Black standing behind crying while saying he does not want to die, but wants to live. When Leo forces his eyesight upon King of Despair, he pushes Leo away angrily while telling Black to go back to sleep. White effectively banishes King of Despair from Black, but also becomes a part of the seal that protects the city. Black is shown watching Leo cry from a distance, talking to White as if she were still there. He calls Leo their hero, commenting on how he looked brave even while crying.

In an original video animation Libra courts some extremely wealthy potential sponsors at an otherworldly restaurant, only to discover the food served there is so delicious it drives them insane. Leonardo finds an unlikely ally in Femt when the kitchen staff is imperiled by an outside threat.

== Reception ==
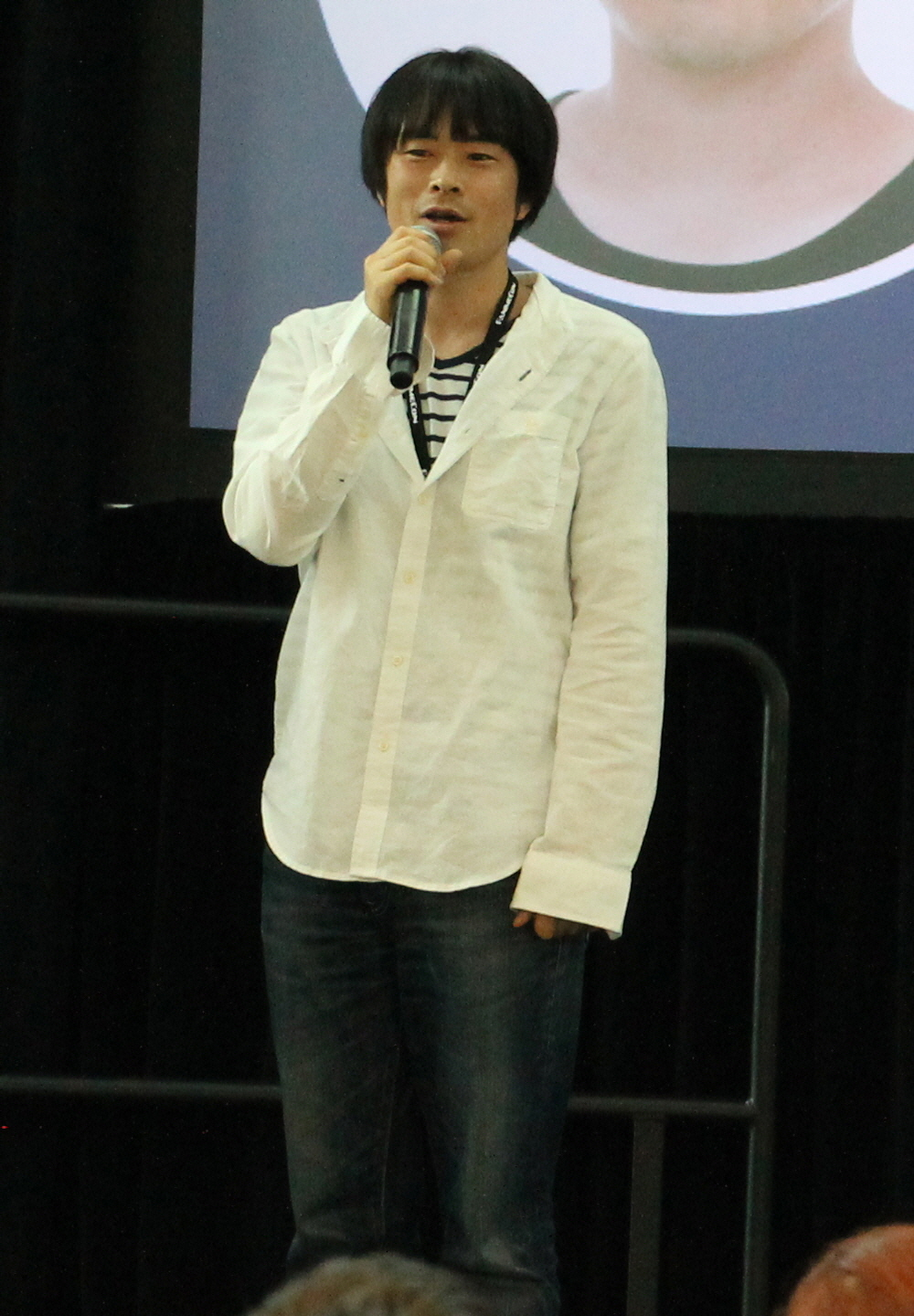
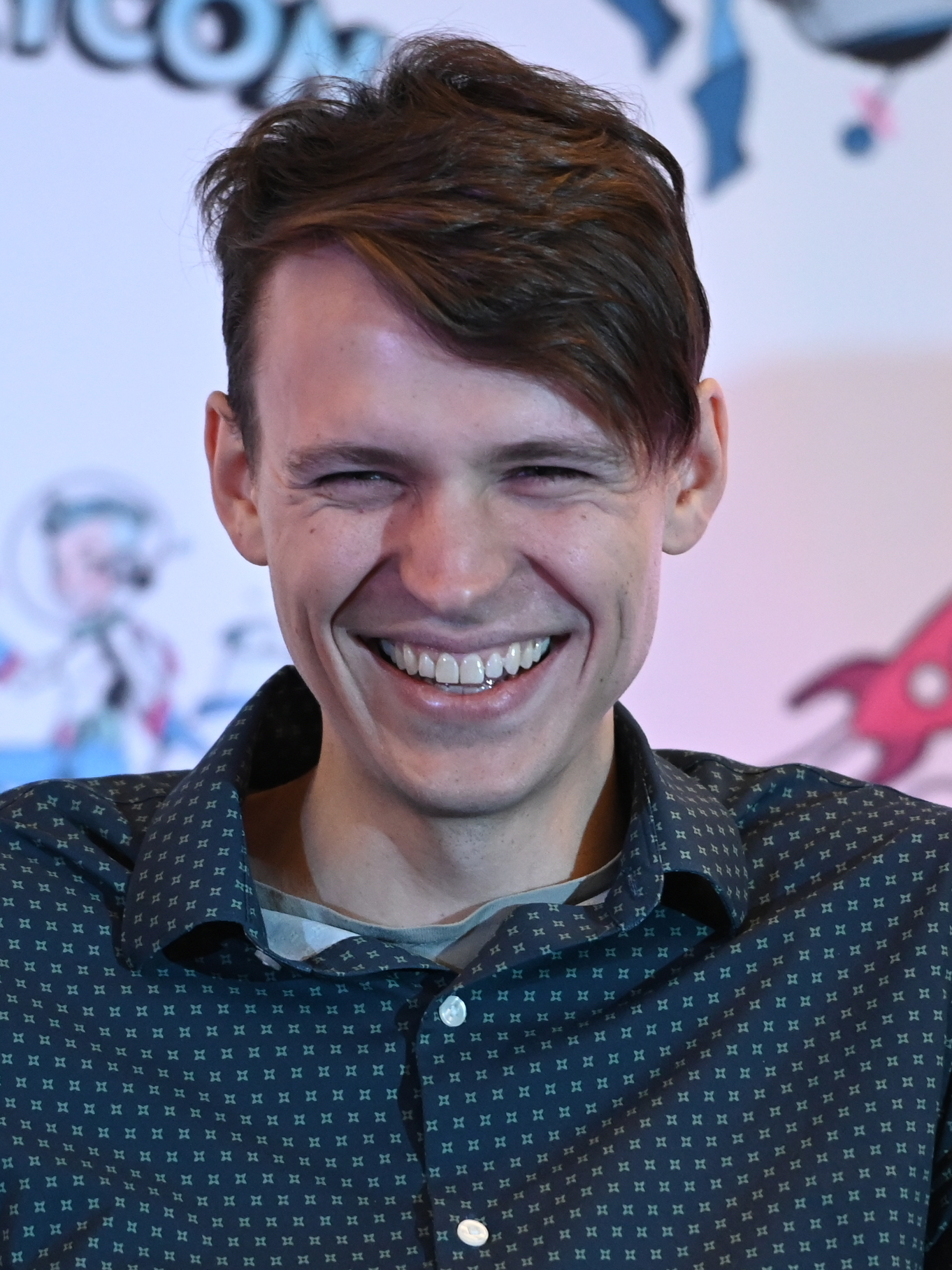
Daisuke Sakaguchi (left) and Aaron Dismuke (right) voiced Leonardo in Japanese and English, respectively.

Critical response to Leonardo's role in the manga was mixed. While in the first volumes of the series, Anime News Network regarded him as an audience surrogate rather than his own character, his story with the hamburger fanatic alien was felt to be the most charming chapter of the entire series so far due to how they become friends and at the same time enjoyed the comical scenario where he, Zapp, and Zed spend 60 chapters looking for a safe restaurant making and fail at it, it stand out Nightow's writing. Comic Bastards was disappointed by how weak Leonardo is presesnted in the narrative mainly due to how impressive are the Libra members in terms of fighting. MTV Geek found compared him initially with a shonen manga lead character due to how incompetent he is presented as, with how his supernatural skills bring parallels with other members from Libra. While noting the character tends to have a poor luck, The Fandom Post enjoyed how Leonardo can still solve issues whenever he find himself alone. Otaku USA found in general Leonardo to be a common character within series whose cast involves fighters possessing supernatural powers.

The Fandom Post criticized Leonaro's role in the anime for often being in the need of help or suffering, but still felt that thanks to the eyes, the character is given his own appealing scenes, most notably the first anime's finale where he takes a more heroic role seemingly inspired by Klaus, and the rest members of Libra, in order to save White and Black from the King of Despair while still giving a major message to the audience during his final confrontation. Anime News Network enjoyed Rie Matsumoto's work in the anime series due how, besides expanding Leonardo's role in the narrative, he also forms a romantic bond with White. The same site said that despite Leonardo's constant grief for making Michella's lose her eyesight, the anime gives him a more optimistic personality, and establishes a good relationship with Klaus. Manga.Tokyo was more negative to the character, stating that while the staff aims to be likable, his constant need of help due to his weakeness made him difficult to be enjoyable. Nevertheless, the reviewer claimed that Leonardo's supernatural eyes help the character to stand out.

Despite Leonardo's take in the original series, his role in the sequel Beyond was met with praise most notably when dealing with his comical due to his first panic attack upon hearing about her marriage which causes him to possess civilians during his shock. Nevertheless, when the Leonardo meets her person for first time in the series, Manga.Tokyo said Leonardo came across as more caring due to how he treats his sister. His role in the final episode from Beyond earned more positive response since he fights for Michella, developing a form of technique for the first time in his life. Anime News Network agreed in the way how Leonardo interacts with his sister and tries to give handle his enemy of on his own due to the threat of his sister being almost killed. In a more general overview of the Beyond, Manga.Tokyo claimed that while the final episode managed to bring more information about the characters' eyes, there were not major changes in the story due to the lack of an overreaching narrative.

Despite general mixed response, Leonardo has been a popular character. In the February 2017 issue of Newtype, Leonardo was voted as the second best male anime character behind Code Geass's Lelouch Lamperouge. In November from the same year, the character was also voted as the 15th best older brother in anime in a poll by Anime!Anime. In another poll by Anime!Anime, Leonardo was voted as the third best Daisuke Sakaguchi character.

== See also ==
- List of Blood Blockade Battlefront characters
