= Rie Matsumoto =

Japanese anime director and storyboard artist

- Born: 1985 (age 40–41)
- Occupations: Director, storyboard artist
- Years active: 2006–present

Rie Matsumoto (松本 理恵, Matsumoto Rie; born 1985) is a Japanese anime director and storyboard artist.

== Career ==
Matsumoto has risen to prominence for being one of the youngest anime directors and one of the few women directors in the industry. She first began working as assistant and episode director for several anime based on the Pretty Cure franchise in the late 2000s. In 2010, she directed the film HeartCatch PreCure The Movie: Fashion Show in the Flower Capital... Really?!, her first work as head director. She directed the ONA Kyōsōgiga in 2012, which was well received. More recently, her direction of 2015's Blood Blockade Battlefront earned her praise.

== Filmography ==
Year	Title	Role	Notes
2006	Futari wa Pretty Cure Splash Star	Assistant director (18 episodes)	Television series
2007	Yes! PreCure 5	Episode director (2 episodes), assistant episode director (9 episodes)	Television series
2007	Yes! PreCure 5 The Movie: Great Miraculous Adventure in the Mirror Kingdom!	Assistant director	Film
2008	Yes! PreCure 5 GoGo!	Episode director (7 episodes), storyboard (4 episodes)	Television series
2009	Fresh Pretty Cure!	Episode director, storyboard, and unit director (5 episodes)	Television series
2009	Marie & Gali	Episode director and storyboard (1 episode)	Television series
2010	Pretty Cure All Stars DX2: Light of Hope☆Protect the Rainbow Jewel!	Storyboard, unit director	Film
2010	HeartCatch PreCure The Movie: Fashion Show in the Flower Capital... Really?!	Director	Film
2011	Pretty Cure All Stars DX3: Deliver the Future! The Rainbow-Colored Flower That Connects the World	Storyboard, unit director	Film
2011	Kyōsōgiga	Director	ONA
2012	Kyōsōgiga Dainidan	Series director, episode director (2 episodes), storyboard (3 episodes)	ONA
2012	Saint Seiya Omega	Episode director and storyboard (2 episodes)	Television series
2013	Kyōsōgiga	Series director, episode director and script (3 episodes), storyboard (7 episodes), series composition	Television series
2015	Blood Blockade Battlefront	Series director, episode director (1 episode), storyboard (12 episodes, OP/ED), sound director	Television series
2016	Blood Blockade Battlefront: King of the Restaurant of Kings	Director, screenplay, storyboard	OVA
2017	Blood Blockade Battlefront & Beyond	Storyboard (ED), episode director (ED)	Television series
2018	"Baby I Love You Daze"	Director	Music video
2020	"Gotcha!"	Director	Music video
2027	Fate Rewinder	Series director	Television series
