= HeartCatch PreCure! =

Japanese anime television series

- Cover of the 15th volume by Marvelous Entertainment, featuring the four main Cures and Cure Flower. In clockwise order: Cure Sunshine, Cure Blossom, Cure Marine, Cure Moonlight and Cure Flower in the center (except for Chypre, Coffret, Potpourri and Cologne)

ハートキャッチプリキュア! (Hātokyatchi PuriKyua!)
- Genre: Magical girl, action
- Created by: Izumi Todo
- Anime television series
- Directed by: Tatsuya Nagamine
- Produced by: Atsutoshi Umezawa
- Written by: Takashi Yamada
- Music by: Yasuharu Takanashi
- Studio: Toei Animation
- Original network: ANN (ABC, TV Asahi)
- Original run: February 7, 2010 – January 30, 2011
- Episodes: 49
- Manga
- Written by: Izumi Todo
- Illustrated by: Futago Kamikita
- Published by: Kodansha
- Magazine: Nakayoshi
- Original run: March 2010 – February 2011
- Volumes: 1
- Video game

HeartCatch PreCure! Oshare Collection
- Developer: Namco Bandai Games
- Publisher: Namco Bandai Games
- Genre: Minigame
- Platform: Nintendo DS
- Released: August 5, 2010
- Anime film

HeartCatch PreCure! the Movie: Fashion Show in the Flower Capital... Really?!
- Directed by: Rie Matsumoto
- Produced by: Gyarmath Bogdan
- Written by: Takashi Yamada
- Music by: Yasuharu Takanashi
- Studio: Toei Animation
- Released: October 30, 2010
- Runtime: 71 minutes
- Video game

Koe de Asobu! HeartCatch PreCure!
- Developer: Toei Animation
- Publisher: Toei Animation
- Genre: Non-game
- Platform: Nintendo DS
- Released: November 11, 2010
- Light novel
- Written by: Takashi Yamada
- Illustrated by: Yoshihiko Umakoshi
- Published by: Kodansha
- Imprint: Kodansha Character Bunko
- Published: September 16, 2015

HeartCatch PreCure! (ハートキャッチプリキュア!, Hātokyatchi PuriKyua!), or HeartCatch Pretty Cure!, is a Japanese anime television series and the seventh installment in the Pretty Cure metaseries by Izumi Todo, featuring the fifth generation of Cures. The series is produced by Toei Animation, directed by Tatsuya Nagamine, and written by Takashi Yamada. Character designs were done by Yoshihiko Umakoshi who previously worked Ojamajo Doremi. The series premiered on February 7, 2010 before Octonauts, on TV Asahi's ANN network, succeeding Fresh Pretty Cure!, and ended on January 30, 2011, where it was succeeded by Suite PreCure.

The series has three topics: the language of flowers, which is an important element in the plot; the second is fashion, as Tsubomi joins the fashion club; and the third is music, as some of the Cures' attacks are named after musical terms and the series has several music-themed episodes. Overall, the Cures' main motifs are related to flowers, nature, and music, which are prominent in the names of characters and items, as well as the main storyline.

== Story ==
In each person resides a Heart Flower, which is connected to the great Heart Tree that watches over everyone. Protecting this tree are the HeartCatch Pretty Cures, who defend it against the Desert Apostles, who plan to wilt everything and turn the world into a desert. However, when the current Pretty Cure, Cure Moonlight, is defeated in battle and the Heart Tree loses its flowers, she sends twin fairies, Chypre and Coffret, to the surface to seek out her replacement. They find Tsubomi Hanasaki, a shy flower-loving girl who recently moved to Kibougahana with her family who is given the power to become Cure Blossom. Alongside her new friend, Erika Kurumi, who becomes Cure Marine, they fight against the Desert Apostles, who transform the wilting Heart Flowers inside people into monsters known as Desertians. By defeating these monsters, they gain Heart Seeds, which allow the Heart Tree to become healthier again.

== Characters ==
=== HeartCatch Pretty Cures ===
Tsubomi Hanasaki (花咲 つぼみ, Hanasaki Tsubomi) / Cure Blossom (キュアブロッサム, Kyua Burossamu)
Voiced by: Nana Mizuki
The main protagonist. Tsubomi is a shy and introverted 14-year-old girl and a second-year student at Myōdōu Academy. She loves to plant flowers and initially plans to join the Gardener's Club, but Erika convinces her to join the Fashion Club instead. Her family's house is also a flower shop called the "Hanasaki Flower Shop", and her grandmother Kaoruko runs a botanical garden. She sees her change of schools as a chance to change herself, and after meeting Erika she starts to change. In the first fight, when Erika is targeted and turned into a Desertian, her desire to save Erika convinces the fairies she has the potential to become a Pretty Cure. As Cure Blossom, her dark red hair becomes light pink. Her powers are related to flowers and she can use auxiliary attacks such as Blossom Flower Storm and Blossom Double Impact in addition to her finishing attack. Her catchphrase is "I've had enough!" or "I've now cut off my cord of patience!" (私、堪忍袋の緒が切れました!, Watashi, kan-nin-bukuro no o ga kiremashita!). Unlike most Pretty Cure protagonists, she has a shy personality, is not greedy with food, and enjoys studying.
She introduces herself as "The flower spreading throughout the land, Cure Blossom!" (大地に咲く一輪の花、キュアブロッサム!, Daichi ni saku ichirin no hana, Kyua Burossamu!) Her theme color is pink and her flower symbol is the cherry blossom.
Erika Kurumi (来海 えりか, Kurumi Erika) / Cure Marine (キュアマリン, Kyua Marin)
Voiced by: Fumie Mizusawa
Erika is a 13-year-old girl and a second-year student at Myōdō Academy who is Tsubomi's classmate, neighbor, and friend. Her father is a cameraman and her mother is the owner of a fashion shop called "Fairy Drop". In addition, she loves fashion and designing her own clothing, and is the president of the academy's Fashion Club. She is jealous of her older sister Momoka, who is a model despite still being in high school. She is an energetic girl who bluntly says what she is thinking, although she also begins to change after meeting Tsubomi and convincing her to join the Fashion Club after its old members left. After she is informed of the qualifications of being a Pretty Cure, she agrees to help Tsubomi. As Cure Marine, her dark blue hair becomes light blue. She has powers related to the ocean and can use auxiliary attacks such as Marine Shoot and Marine Dynamite in addition to her finishing attack. Her catchphrase is "Even me, with a heart wider than the ocean, has reached her limits!" (海より広いあたしの心も、ここらが我慢の限界よ!, Umi yori hiroi atashi no kokoro mo, kokora ga gaman no genkai yo!).
She introduces herself as "The flower fluttering in the ocean winds, Cure Marine!" (海風に揺れる一輪の花、キュアマリン!, Umikaze ni yureru ichirin no hana, Kyua Marīn!) Her theme color is blue, and her flower symbol is the blue daisy.
Itsuki Myoudouin (明堂院 いつき, Myōdōin Itsuki) / Cure Sunshine (キュアサンシャイン, Kyua Sanshain)
Voiced by: Houko Kuwashima
Itsuki is a kind and calm-tempered 14-year-old girl and a second-year student at Myōdō Academy. She is brave and compassionate, and she is the president of the academy's student council and the granddaughter of its current principal. She has many fans, and initially Tsubomi had a temporary admiration for her until discovering her gender. She crossdresses to substitute as the heir of the school and dojo in place of her ailing older brother Satsuki. She also has a fondness for cute and girly things, but is she not convinced to join Fashion Club. In Episode 22, she finds Potpourri, and later becomes Cure Sunshine to rescue Tsubomi and Erika and save Satsuki's Heart Flower. As Cure Sunshine, her short brown hair becomes longer and becomes golden. Her powers are related to the sun and tcan use auxiliary attacks such as Sunflower Aegis and Sunshine Flash, in addition to her finishing attack. Her catchphrase is "I will heal the darkness in your heart with my light!" (その心の闇、私の光で照らしてみせる!, Sono kokoro no yami, watashi no hikari de tera shitemiseru!). Her theme color is yellow and her secondary colour is gold, and her flower symbol is the sunflower.
She introduces herself as "The flower bathing in the sunlight, Cure Sunshine!" (陽の光浴びる一輪の花、キュアサンシャイン!, Hi no hikari abiru ichirin no hana, Kyua Sanshain!)
Yuri Tsukikage (月影 ゆり, Tsukikage Yuri) / Cure Moonlight (キュアムーンライト, Kyua Mūnraito)
Voiced by: Aya Hisakawa
A 17-year-old girl and Momoka's best friend, who is a second-year student at Myōdō Academy's high school branch. She shares class notes with Momoka when the latter cannot attend classes because of her job and heads the list of successful candidates in the grade. Her father went missing while investigating the Heart Tree in France. As revealed in the novel, she met Cologne while searching for her father, and as Cure Moonlight, she protected the Tree of Hearts and knew Kaoruko when she was Cure Flower. Prior to the beginning of the series, she was defeated during her fight against the Dark Precure, and as result her Pretty Cure Seed broke and the Heart Tree withered. During the fight, Cologne sacrificed himself to protect her. As a result of her past trauma, she is not willing to help the new Pretty Cures, but later on the power of the Heart Tree and the Heart Pot allows her to regain her Pretty Cure Seed and become Cure Moonlight once more. As Cure Moonlight, her dark purple hair becomes lighter. She has powers related to the moon and can use auxiliary attacks in addition to her finishing attack. Her catchphrase is "I'll keep fighting, for everyone's heart!" (全ての心が満ちるまで、私は戦い続ける!, Subete no kokoro ga michi rumade, watashi wa tatakai tsuzukeru !). Her theme color is purple and her secondary colour is silver and her flower symbol is the rose.
She introduces herself as "The flower glistening in the light of the moon, Cure Moonlight!" (月光に冴える一輪の花、キュアムーンライト!, Gekkou ni saeru ichirin no hana, Kyua Mūnraito!)

=== Fairies ===
Unlike other fairies in the franchise, the fairies in this series are born from the Heart Tree and can separately find their own partner to become a Pretty Cure. They are also different from previous mascots in that they all end their sentences with "desu".

Chypre (シプレ, Shipure)
Voiced by: Taeko Kawata
One of the twin fairies who protects the Heart Tree. To save it from danger, she has come to look for the Pretty Cure, the legendary warriors chosen by the Heart Tree. She gives Tsubomi a Pretty Cure Seed and Heart Perfume, allowing her to transform into Cure Blossom. She often disguises herself as a stuffed animal. She has the power to give birth to Heart Seeds, which are said to cause a miracle if collected. Chypre tends to be calmer than her fellow mascot, Coffret. She often behaves as if she is Tsubomi's big sister. She is named after the floral perfume family chypre.
Coffret (コフレ, Kofure)
Voiced by: Motoko Kumai
One of the twin fairies that protect the Heart Tree, and gives Erika a Pretty Cure Seed and Heart Perfume, allowing her to transform into Cure Marine. He also tends to disguise himself as a stuffed animal and can give birth to Heart Seeds. He is rather bold and nice to others, and is like a little brother to Erika. He is named after a French term for a jewelry box or casket.
Potpourri (ポプリ, Popuri)
Voiced by: Kokoro Kikuchi
First appearing in episode 20, Potpourri is a baby fairy born from the Heart Tree, who is colored orange-white rather than cyan-white like Chypre and Coffret. Potpourri carries an orange Heart Seed in their bag, which acts as the key to the Pretty Cure Palace, and has the ability to create barriers to protect others. Potpourri can be rash and bratty at times, but has a strong desire to protect the Pretty Cure. In Episode 22, Potpourri becomes Itsuki's partner and allows her to transform into Cure Sunshine. Potpourri is named after potpourri, a mixture of dried plants used to provide fragrance. Being younger than both Chypre and Coffret, Potpourri tends to end their sentences with 'de-chu' instead of 'desu'.
Cologne (コロン, Koron)
Voiced by: Akira Ishida
Cologne was Yuri's partner fairy, who sacrificed himself to protect her. He had nursed Chypre and Coffret since their birth, behaving calmly as their elder brother. His spirit now resides in the Heart Tree and keeps watch over her, and reappears in episode 30 to speak to her. He is also colored differently from other fairies, being lavender-white instead of cyan-white like Chypre and Coffret. He is named after cologne, a type of perfume for men.
Coupé (コッペ, Koppe)
Voiced by: Ken'yū Horiuchi
A giant fairy who resides in the botanical garden that Tsubomi's grandmother Kaoruko cares for. He does not talk, but is always watching over Tsubomi and Erika. He is a legendary fairy that is said to have supported Kaoruko in the past when she was Cure Flower. The younger fairies admired him. He also has the ability to transform into a human, usually taking the form of Kaoruko's late husband, Sora Hanasaki. He saves the Pretty Cures several times, but they are unaware of his identity as Couple until he guards the Heartcatch Mirage to test the Pretty Cures. He is named after Coupé, a type of closed car body style used on hardtop sports cars.

=== Kibougahana residents ===
Kaoruko Hanasaki (花咲 薫子, Hanasaki Kaoruko) / Cure Flower (キュアフラワー, Kyua Furawā)
Voiced by: Chika Sakamoto
Tsubomi's grandmother and Yoichi's widowed mother, who is a famous botanist and owner of the Flower Shop. Kaoruko is considered to be wise and kind, and cares deeply for her granddaughter, who she helped to take care of when she was younger. She loves flowers, which inspired Tsubomi's love for them. When she was younger, she became the youngest champion in the history of the national judo contest and met Sora during her time living in Kamakura. In her youth, she became Cure Flower in her youth after she met Coupe while studying the Tree of Hearts, and was the previous senior of Cure Moonlight. She once defeated Dune using the Heartcatch Mirage, but at the cost of her own Pretty Cure Seed being destroyed in the aftermath. In Episode 44, her Christmas wish is to become Cure Flower again for one day to help Tsubomi and the others, which she succeeds in. Like Tsubomi, her attacks are related to flowers, but she lacks the power to conjure up stronger attacks. As Cure Flower, her theme color is pink and her flower symbol is the Lotus Flower.
She introduces herself as "The flower shining in holy light, Cure Flower!" (聖なる光に輝く一輪の花、キュアフラワー!, Seinaru Hikari kagayaku ichirin no hana, Kyua Furawā!)
Mizuki Hanasaki (花咲 みずき, Hanasaki Mizuki)
Voiced by: Yoko Kato
Tsubomi's mother, a florist at the Hanasaki Flower Shop. She was once an officer of a famous florist chain supplier called "Red Florian". After the events of the series, she gives birth to a second daughter, Futaba Hanasaki (ふたば, Hanasaki Futaba).
Yoichi Hanasaki (花咲 陽一, Hanasaki Youichi)
Voiced by: Nobuaki Kanemitsu
Tsubomi's father and Kaoruko's only son, who is a florist at Hanasaki Flower Shop and a part-time professor.
Sora Hanasaki (花咲 空, Hanasaki Sora)
Voiced by: Ken'yū Horiuchi
Tsubomi's late grandfather, Kaoruko's husband, and Yoichi's father, who died after his son's birth. He was a cellist living in Kamakura, who met his future wife at his cabin in a lavender forest.
Sakura Kurumi (来海さくら, Kurumi Sakura)
Voiced by: Hyo-sei
Erika's mother, who is one of the owners of Fairy Drop and was a famous former model.
Ryūnosuke Kurumi (来海 流之助, Kurumi Ryunosuke)
Voiced by: Kōichi Tōchika
Erika's father, a famous photographer who likes to take pictures.
Momoka Kurumi (来海 ももか, Kurumi Momoka)
Voiced by: Shizuka Itō
Erika's older sister, who is a second-year student at Myōdō Academy's Senior High School branch, and is nicknamed Momo-nee by Erika. She is a popular part-time model, which caused Erika to be jealous of her. In Episode 8, she was revealed to be equally jealous of Erika's ability to easily make friends.
Tsubaki Myoudouin (明堂院 つばき, Myōdōin Tsubaki)
Voiced by: Atsuko Yuya
Itsuki's mother and Gentarou's daughter.
Satsuki Myoudouin (明堂院 さつき, Myōdōin Satsuki)
Voiced by: Tomoaki Maeno
Itsuki's older brother, an outstanding fighter who was originally the heir to the Myoudouin family's dojo. But as a result of his health condition, Itsuki began crossdressing to take his place. In contrast to his sister's masculine appearance, Satsuki exhibits an effeminate appearance.
Gentarou Myoudouin (明堂院 厳太郎, Myōdōin Gentarou)
Voiced by: Hiroshi Naka
Itsuki's grandfather, who is the principal of Myōdō Academy and the leader of Kibougahana's local dojo.
Haruna Tsukikage (月影 はるな, Tsukikage Haruna)
Voiced by: Rei Sakuma
Yuri's mother, who has worked at a convenience store near the local train station since her husband disappeared.
Ms. Tsurusaki (鶴崎先生, Tsurusaki-sensei)
Voiced by: Hiroko Ushida
Tsubomi and Erika's homeroom teacher at Myōdō Academy, who is strict but reliable. She is afraid of ghosts, which she thinks is interfering with her teaching.
Nanami Shiku (志久 ななみ, Shiku Nanami)
Voiced by: Yukiyo Fujii
Tsubomi and Erika's classmate, who is secretly a fan of Itsuki. Ever since her mother died, she has acted as a mother to her younger sister Rumi, leaving her little time for outside activities such as the Fashion Club. However, she changes her mind in Episode 14.
Tatsuya Ozuka (大塚 たつや, Ozuka Tatsuya), Naomi Sawai (沢井 なおみ, Sawai Naomi), Rumiko Kuroda (黒田 るみこ, Kuroda Rumiko), Toshiko Sakuma (佐久間 としこ, Sakuma Toshiko)
Voiced by: Naoki Mizutani, Yukiko Hanioka, Tomo Adachi, Seiko Yoshida
Tsubomi and Erika's classmates.
Kanae Tada (多田 かなえ, Tada Kanae)
Voiced by: Sachiko Kojima
Tsubomi and Erika's classmate, who likes photography and is eager to take pictures of the Pretty Cure.
Ban Kenji (蛮ケンジ, Kenji Ban)
Voiced by: Ryōtarō Okiayu
A student at Myōdō Academy, who despite his intimidating appearance and reputation as a supposed delinquent, is an aspiring manga artist and fan of the Pretty Cure.

=== Desert Apostles ===
The Desert Apostles (砂漠の使徒, Sabaku no Shito) are the main antagonists of the series. They serve and take orders from Dune, and aim to take over the world and turn it into a giant desert, a process which they aim to speed up by taking peoples' wilted Heart Flowers. They are also responsible for the withering of the Great Tree of Hearts.

Dune (デューン, Dyūn)
Voiced by: Hikaru Midorikawa
Dune is the leader of the Desert Apostles and the main antagonist, who aims to destroy the Tree of Hearts and has fought against previous generations of Pretty Cure. His backstory is revealed in the novel. His father, the previous Desert King, killed his birth mother, then met and married another woman, who became Dune's stepmother. Dune's father wanted to kill him, and his nanny sacrificed herself to allow him to escape. Two years later, a then 9-year-old Dune made a contract with a devil to obtain power in exchange for killing his father. After doing so, he inherited his father's status as the Desert King. 50 years before the series' events, he was defeated by Cure Flower, who used the Heartcatch Mirage to seal him away. He is first shown as a shadow on a video screen, talking to Sabark about Potpourri's recent birth, and in flashbacks. Dune arrives on Earth after regaining his strength and sends a Desert Seed down to Earth, which turns into a Desert Devil. He is eventually defeated by the Pretty Cure after they achieve the Infinity Silhouette form and died peacefully while liberating him from his long hatred.
Hideaki Tsukikage (月影 英明, Tsukikage Hideaki) / Professor Sabark (サバーク博士, Sabāku-hakase)
Voiced by: Taiten Kusunoki
Dune's right-hand man who is later revealed to be Yuri's long-lost father, Hideaki Tsukikage. He was a brilliant scientist and researcher who went missing while investigating the Tree of Hearts and was brainwashed into becoming Professor Sabark after Baron Salamander gave him a mask. He is usually seen sitting on a chair on a high level in the Desert Apostles' base, with the Dark Precure by his side. He wishes to finish off the newest generation of Pretty Cure and take down the Tree of Hearts. In episode 48, his mask shatters and he is freed from the Desert Apostles' control. He then confronts Dune and is ultimately killed saving Cure Blossom and Moonlight. The ashes from his remains are later buried in Yuri's hometown in Yamanashi Prefecture, and Yuri chooses to keep the circumstances of his death a secret from her mother.
Dark Precure (ダークプリキュア, Dāku Purikyua)
Voiced by: Minami Takayama
An artificially created Pretty Cure who acts as Sabark's second-in-command and is with him whenever a Desert Apostle has an audience with him. Prior to the series' events, she fought against Cure Moonlight in front of the Heart Tree and won her half-broken Pretty Cure Seed. She has overwhelming strength, as she was able to easily defeat Cure Blossom and Cure Marine and revert their transformations. She also often fights against Cure Moonlight, who is her rival. It is hinted that Dark Precure and Cure Moonlight are related in episode 47, where she refers to the recently unmasked Professor Sabark as her father. In the following episode, this is confirmed when Sabark reveals that some of Yuri's DNA was used in her creation. In episode 47, she was defeated by Moonlight's Floral Power Fortissimo, and died the next episode.
Kumojacky (クモジャキー, Kumojakī)
Voiced by: Eiji Takemoto
Kumojacky is the leader of Sabark's three generals, whose name is derived from kumo, meaning spider. In the novel, it is revealed that Sabark created him using the genes of a spider and the wilted Heart Flower of a young man who wanted to become a professional martial artist, but was barred from martial arts schools because of his harsh and self-centered mindset. He likes to see other people's pain and is also arrogant, claiming that not even one hundred Cures can defeat him. Despite this, he is well-mannered, and always introduces himself to others. He is also passionate about fighting and has a sense of honor, as he believes in fair fights and does not fight weak enemies. He also does not hesitate to tell people their weaknesses, and even encourages them to become stronger. He first appears in episode 4 and is defeated in episode 46 along with Cobraja. He last appears in episode 49, where he is shown to have returned to his original self and joined the Myoudouin Dojo under the name Kumamoto.
Sasorina (サソリーナ, Sasorīna)
Voiced by: Urara Takano
Sasorina is one of Sabark's three generals, whose name is derived from sasori, meaning scorpion. In the novel, it is revealed that Sabark created her using the genes of a scorpion and the wilted Heart Flower of a nursery school teacher who was hospitalized after suffering a mental breakdown as a result of an accident that killed one of her students. She is the first to appear before the heroines, first appearing in episode 1. She speaks with a foreign accent and can use her hair like a scorpion's tail. Most of the time, she has a calm aura around her, but becomes angered when provoked. Sasorina looks down on weak people, but will acknowledge strong foes. She is defeated in episode 40 and last appears in episode 49, where she is shown to have returned to her original self and become a kindergarten teacher.
Cobraja (コブラージャ, Koburāja)
Voiced by: Hirofumi Nojima
Cobraja is one of Sabark's three generals, whose name is derived from the cobra. In the novel, it is revealed that Sabark created him using the genes of a cobra and the wilted Heart Flower of a fashion coordinator who became an outcast as a result of abusing models who were not as beautiful as he was and fighting with designers who did not meet his standards. He is a narcissistic man who believes he is the most beautiful man in the universe. He often makes the Snackey take pictures of him or make people give him attention. While fighting the Pretty Cures, he hesitates to fight to avoid damaging his appearance and wants them to admire him. He can also throw lethal autographs to attack others. He first appears in episode 5 and is defeated in episode 46 along with Kumojacky. He last appears in episode 49, where he is shown to have returned to his original self and become a fashion designer.
Snackey (スナッキー, Sunakkī)
Voiced by: Chado Hori, Ryou Iwasaki
The Snackeys are the Desert Apostles' minions, who take various forms and work to fulfill their orders and requests. They cannot talk properly and instead use the word "Ki" when talking.
Desertrian (デザトリアン, Dezatorian)
Voiced by: Tomoko Kaneda
Monsters formed by fusing stolen wilted Heart Flowers with objects. Unlike other monsters in the franchise, they are capable of speech, voicing the worries of the person's Heart Flower which caused it to wilt. They get stronger as the person's Heart Flower wilts. Later in the series, Sabark's generals gain Dark Bracelets that enable them to take direct control of a Desertrian if its motives waver, making them more powerful in the process.

=== Film-only characters ===
Olivier (オリヴィエ) / Loup-Garou (ルー・ガルー, Rū・garū)
Voiced by: Ikue Ōtani
Olivier is the adoptive child of Baron Salamander, who can take the form of a werewolf. He appeared in the series in Dune's flashback in episode 48. In the film, he is adopted by Baron Salamander after he unsealed him from his 400-year prison. He and Baron Salamander were the only surviving members of the Desert Apostles after the organization's defeat.
Baron Salamander (サラマンダー男爵, Saramandā Danshaku)
Voiced by: Keiji Fujiwara
Baron Salamander is a lost member of the Desert Apostles who was originally Dune's right-hand man before Professor Sabark took his place. He appeared in the series in Dune's flashback in episode 48, and was responsible for giving Hideaki the mask that caused him to become Sabark. He is the main antagonist of the film, who was defeated by Cure Ange and sealed inside the abbey on Mont Saint-Michel in France, but was unsealed by Olivier 400 years later.
Cure Ange (キュアアンジェ, Kyua Anje)
A Cure who is mentioned as the first Pretty Cure in the series' chronology. 400 years ago, she defeated Baron Salamander and sealed him in the abbey on Mont Saint-Michel in France. She is said to be connected to the creation of the Pretty Cure Palace and the Heartcatch Mirage.

== Media ==
=== Anime ===
The anime, directed by Tatsuya Nagamine and produced by Toei Animation, aired in Japan on ABC and other ANN stations between February 7, 2010, and January 30, 2011. The series uses three pieces of theme music, one opening and two ending themes. The opening theme is "Alright! HeartCatch PreCure!" (Alright!ハートキャッチプリキュア!, Alright! Hātokyatchi Purikyua) by Aya Ikeda. The ending theme for episodes 1–24 is "HeartCatch☆Paradise!" (ハートキャッチ☆パラダイス!) by Mayu Kudou, whilst the ending theme for episodes 25–49 is "Tomorrow Song ~Ashita no Uta~" (Tomorrow Song ～あしたのうた～) by Kudou.

=== Print ===
A manga adaptation by Futago Kamikita began serialization in Kodansha's Nakayoshi magazine From March 2010 until February 2011. A novel adaptation, which expands the series was then released on September 16, 2015, under Kodansha's Character Bunko label. It is written by Takashi Yamada and illustrated by Yoshihiko Umakoshi.

=== Films ===
The heroines also appear in all Pretty Cure All Stars films, starting with Pretty Cure All Stars DX2: Light of Hope☆Protect the Rainbow Jewel! (プリキュアオールスターズDX2 希望の光☆レインボージュエルを守れ！, PuriKyua Ōru Sutāzu Dirakkusu Tsū: Kibō no Hikari☆Reinbō Jueru o Mamore!) The DX2 film was released on March 20, 2010.

A film based on the HeartCatch PreCure series titled HeartCatch PreCure The Movie: Fashion Show in the Flower Capital... Really?! (ハートキャッチプリキュア!花の都でファッションショー・・・ですか!?, HātoKyatchi PuriKyua! Hana no Miyako de Fasshon Shō... desu ka!?) was released in Japan on October 30, 2010. It follows the Pretty Cures as they go to France and encounter a mysterious boy named Olivier, who is being manipulated by the mysterious villain, Baron Salamander. The French-language version released by Imagine in France on January 26, 2011, under the title HeartCatch Pretty Cure! Le film: Mission défilé à Paris (HeartCatch Pretty Cure! The Movie: The Paris Show Mission). The film has been nominated for a Kidscreen Award for Best One-off, Special or TV Movie for Kids.

Tropical-Rouge! Pretty Cure the Movie: The Snow Princess and the Miraculous Ring! (映画 トロピカル～ジュ！プリキュア 雪のプリンセスと奇跡の指輪！, Eiga Toropikarūju Purikuya Yuki no Purinsesu to Kiseki no Yubiwa!), was released on October 23, 2021.

=== Video games ===
There are currently three video games based on the series produced by Bandai. An educational game, Fashionable Transformation★HeartCatch PreCure! (おしゃれにへんしん★ハートキャッチプリキュア！, Oshare ni Henshin★HātoKyatchi PuriKyua!), was released for the Sega Beena on July 22, 2010. HeartCatch PreCure! Fashion Collection (ハートキャッチプリキュア！おしゃれコレクション, HātoKyatchi PuriKyua! Oshare Korekushon) is a minigame collection for the Nintendo DS and was released on August 5, 2010. Another DS title, Let's Play with Voices! HeartCatch PreCure! (こえであそぼう! ハートキャッチプリキュア!, Koe de Asobō! HātoKyatchi PuriKyua!), released on November 11, 2010, allows players to record their own voices over scenes from the anime.

== Reception ==
The series' success received a cult following by fans and praises of the series' overall presentation and story. The series' character designer, Yoshihiko Umakoshi, was also awarded as best Character Designer in the 2010 Tokyo Anime Awards and the 2011 Tokyo International Anime Fair.

It was also one of the selected anime series of the year in the December 2010 issue of British magazine Impact.

Preceded by Fresh Pretty Cure!	HeartCatch PreCure! 2010-2011	Succeeded by Suite PreCure
