= Blood Blockade Battlefront =

Japanese manga series and its franchise

- First tankōbon volume cover, featuring Klaus V. Reinherz

血界戦線 (Kekkai Sensen)
- Genre: Action; Science fiction; Urban fantasy
- Manga
- Written by: Yasuhiro Nightow
- Published by: Shueisha
- English publisher: NA: Dark Horse Comics
- Imprint: Jump Comics SQ.
- Magazine: Jump Square (January 5 – March 4, 2009); Jump SQ.19 (May 19, 2010 – February 19, 2015)
- Original run: January 5, 2009 – February 19, 2015
- Volumes: 10
Further information
Anime television series
Directed by	Rie Matsumoto
Produced by	Wakana Okamura; Daisuke Furuya; Ryōsuke Mori; Naoki Amano; Mai Murakami; Ryū Hashimoto; Toshiaki Kaneko
Written by	Kazunao Furuya
Music by	Taisei Iwasaki
Studio	Bones
Licensed by	Crunchyroll (formerly): SEA: Plus Media Networks Asia; UK: Anime Limited
Original network	MBS
English network	SEA: Aniplus Asia
Original run	April 5, 2015 – October 4, 2015
Episodes	12 + OVA
Manga
Blood Blockade Battlefront: Back 2 Back
Written by	Yasuhiro Nightow
Published by	Shueisha
Imprint	Jump Comics SQ.
Magazine	Jump SQ.Crown (July 17, 2015 – February 19, 2018); Jump SQ.Rise (April 16, 2018 – April 28, 2022)
Original run	July 17, 2015 – April 28, 2022
Volumes	10
Anime television series
Blood Blockade Battlefront & Beyond
Directed by	Masato Takayanagi
Produced by	Wakana Okamura; Daisuke Furuya; Ryōsuke Mori; Yoshihiro Otsuki; Fumihito Fukino; Hiroshi Kamei
Written by	Yasuko Kamo
Music by	Taisei Iwasaki
Studio	Bones
Licensed by	Crunchyroll: SEA: Plus Media Networks Asia
Original network	MBS
English network	SEA: Aniplus Asia
Original run	October 8, 2017 – December 24, 2017
Episodes	12 + OVA
Manga
Blood Blockade Battlefront: Beat 3 Peat
Written by	Yasuhiro Nightow
Published by	Shueisha
Imprint	Jump Comics SQ.
Magazine	Jump SQ.Rise
Original run	October 26, 2022 – present
Volumes	4
- icon

Blood Blockade Battlefront (Japanese: 血界戦線, Hepburn: Kekkai Sensen; lit. 'Bloodline Battlefront') is a Japanese manga series written and illustrated by Yasuhiro Nightow. It revolves around a young photographer named Leonardo Watch, who obtains 'the All Seeing Eyes of the Gods' at the cost of his sister's eyesight. After the incident, Leonardo moves to the city of Hellsalem's Lot to join an organization known as Libra to fight several monsters as well as terrorists.

Nightow first published a one-shot chapter in Shueisha's shōnen manga magazine Jump Square in May 2008. A three-chapter series, with the subtitle Mafūgai Kessha, was published in the same magazine from January to March 2009. Blood Blockade Battlefront was later serialized in Jump SQ.19 from May 2010 to February 2015, when the magazine ceased publication; Shueisha collected its chapters in ten tankōbon volumes. A direct sequel, titled Blood Blockade Battlefront: Back 2 Back was serialized in Jump SQ.Crown from July 2015 to January 2018, when the magazine ceased publication, and the series was transferred to Jump SQ.Rise, where it ran from April 2018 to April 2022; its chapters were collected in ten tankōbon volumes. A third series, titled Blood Blockade Battlefront: Beat 3 Peat started in Jump SQ.Rise in October 2022.

A 12-episode anime television series produced by Bones was broadcast from April to October 2015. A 12-episode second season was broadcast from October to December 2017.

In North America, the first manga series has been licensed for English language release by Dark Horse Comics, while the anime series has been licensed by Funimation (later Crunchyroll). Both the manga and anime were well received by publications due to its story and characters.

== Plot ==
Blood Blockade Battlefront centers around the crime fighting organization "Libra" and their battles in Hellsalem's Lot, formerly known as New York City. Hellsalem's Lot was created when a portal to the "Beyond" opened, becoming a paranormal melting pot of monsters, magic and the everyday mundane life, and it is up to Libra to clear the streets of trouble and prevent the horrors of this city from spreading to the outside world.

== Media ==
=== Manga ===
Blood Blockade Battlefront is written and illustrated by Yasuhiro Nightow. Nightow first published a one-shot chapter in Shueisha's shōnen manga magazine Jump Square on May 2, 2008. It only featured very few members of the final cast and had a much different tone, with more emphasis on it being a vampire hunting story in a contemporary city. A three-chapter series, titled Kekkai Sensen − Mafūgai Kessha (血界戦線 -魔封街結社-), was serialized in Jump Square from January 5 to March 4, 2009. Another one-shot chapter was published in the second volume of Jump SQ.M (Jump Square Masterpiece) on October 23, 2009. Blood Blockade Battlefront was then serialized in the then brand new quarterly magazine Jump SQ.19 starting on May 19, 2010. The series finished with the 18th and last issue of the magazine on February 19, 2015. Shueisha collected its chapters in ten tankōbon volumes, released from January 4, 2010, to April 3, 2015.

In 2010, the series was licensed for English release by Dark Horse Comics. The ten volumes were released from September 14, 2011, to July 25, 2018. On January 28, 2025, Dark Horse Comics announced that it would publish the series in a 3-in-1 omnibus edition. The three-volume edition was released from September 2, 2025, to March 10, 2026.

==== Sequels ====
A direct sequel, titled Blood Blockade Battlefront: Back 2 Back, started in the first issue of Jump SQ.Crown on July 17, 2015. The magazine ceased publication on January 19, 2018, and the series continued publication in the first issue of Jump SQ.Rise, released on April 16 of that same year. The series finished on April 28, 2022. Shueisha collected its chapters in ten tankōbon volumes, released from January 4, 2016, to August 4, 2022.

A third series, titled Blood Blockade Battlefront: Beat 3 Peat, started in Jump SQ.Rise on October 26, 2022. The first tankōbon volume was released on July 4, 2023. As of July 3, 2026, four volumes have been released.

=== Anime ===
An anime television series adaptation was announced in May 2014. It was produced by studio Bones and directed by Rie Matsumoto. The series was broadcast for 12 episodes on MBS from April 5 to October 4, 2015. (Note: MBS listed the air dates for the series on Saturday at 26:28, which is effectively Sunday at 2:28 a.m. JST.) (Note: The final episode was originally scheduled for broadcast on July 5, 2015, but was delayed further due to exceeding the length of its normal 30 minute timeslot. It was eventually broadcast on October 4 of that same year.) A 25-minute original video animation (OVA) titled "King of the Restaurant of Kings" was bundled with the official Blood Blockade Battlefront guidebook, released on June 3, 2016.

A second season was announced in December 2016. Titled Blood Blockade Battlefront & Beyond (血界戦線 & Beyond), the series was broadcast on MBS from October 8 to December 24, 2017. (Note: MBS listed the air dates for the series on Saturday at 27:08, which is effectively Sunday at 3:08 a.m. JST.) A 24-minute original animation DVD (OAD) was bundled with the fifth volume of the Blood Blockade Battlefront Back 2 Back manga, released on July 4, 2018.

Funimation licensed the series for streaming on its official website. Following Sony's acquisition of Crunchyroll, the series was moved to the platform; the series was removed from the platform in July 2026. The series was licensed by Madman Entertainment and AnimeLab for an English release in Australia and New Zealand.

==== Music ====
The music for the series was composed by Taisei Iwasaki. The original soundtrack album for the series was released on July 15, 2015. The original soundtrack album for Blood Blockade Battlefront & Beyond was released on December 13, 2017. Bump of Chicken performed the first opening theme, "Hello, World!", while Unison Square Garden performed the ending theme "Sugar Song and Bitter Step" (シュガーソングとビターステップ, Shugā Songu to Bitā Suteppu). For Blood Blockade Battlefront & Beyond, Unison Square Garden performed the opening theme "Fake Town Baby", while Daoko and Yasuyuki Okamura (credited as Daoko × Yasuyuki Okamura) performed the ending theme "Step Up Love" (ステップアップ LOVE, Suteppu Appu Rabu).

=== Stage play ===
In the sixth volume of Blood Blockade Battle Front Back 2 Back, it was revealed that a live action stage play inspired by the manga was being produced. It ran at The Galaxy Theatre in Tokyo from November 2–10, 2019, and at Umeda Arts Theater Dramacity from November 14–17 of that same year. Daisuke Nishida directed and wrote the play.

== Reception ==
The manga series of Blood Blockade Battlefront received generally good critical response. Brigid Alverson from MTV Geek criticized the artwork for being hard to follow and stated "it boils down to a matter of taste. Blood Blockade Battleground is a good choice for readers who like a lot of action and don't mind being dropped into the middle of the story, without a lot of setup." On the other hand, The Fandom Post's John Rose praised the artwork more specifically the monsters' designs. He highly recommended it to Trigun's readers as well as superhero comic reader, sci-fi hero and Futurama fans. Several of the volumes have also appeared in rankings for bestselling manga.

The anime adaptation of the series has received generally positive reviews. Jacob Hope Chapman from Anime News Network praised the cast and studio Bones' work. Additionally, he liked the consistency in quality and commented "The contiguous threads laced through these episodic adventures are beginning to converge fast, and while I can't see the full picture yet, I know Rie Matsumoto is building the anime-original material of Leo's romance into something special. The animation continues to be jaw-dropping. The music continues to be soul-warming. There's never enough time in one writeup to talk about everything that makes the episode so damn good. Blood Blockade Battlefront continues to be The Very Best." Jarius Taylor from the Fandom Post called it "both ridiculously cool and ridiculously weird" and praised the cast like Chapman. In a later review he said "It's still not entirely clear what this show is going for yet but for now it's a good ride and I have more than enough faith in the people behind it to believe the destination will be worthwhile." Rachael Verret, a writer from The Mary Sue, gave the series a perfect score having pointed out its "energy and joviality" seen through the cast and the ending sequences which reminded her of another series, Baccano!. Similarly, Chapman wrote an article titled "Three Reasons Why Blood Blockade Battlefront is the Best Show of the Spring" commenting "It's the coolest, cutest, and cleverest anime I've seen in a long time, easily the best new show of the Spring 2015."

The first DVD of the series sold 4,784 units during its debut. Meanwhile, the first Blu-ray sold 12,171 units in its first week of release. For the Newtype preliminary awards for 2015, the series was sixth in the category "Sound" while fourth in the category "Theme Song" for "Sugar Song to Bitter Step." In the category "Best Mascot", Sonic ranked first. In another poll by the Japanese magazine Entermix, the series was voted as the second most popular one.
