= 2010 in anime =

Events in 2010 in anime.

== Accolades ==
At the Mainichi Film Awards, Colorful won the Animation Film Award. Arrietty won the Japan Academy Prize for Animation of the Year. Internationally, King of Thorn, Mai Mai Miracle and Oblivion Island: Haruka and the Magic Mirror were nominated for the Asia Pacific Screen Award for Best Animated Feature Film.

== Releases ==
=== Films ===
A list of anime that debuted in theaters between January 1 and December 31, 2010.

Release date	Title	Studio	Director	Running time (minutes)	Alternate title	Ref
January 23	Fate/stay night: Unlimited Blade Works	Studio Deen	Keizō Kusakawa	105	Gekijō-ban feito/ stay night UNLIMITED burēdo WORKS	
January 23	Magical Girl Lyrical Nanoha: The Movie 1st	Seven Arcs	Yuji Yamaguchi	130	Mahō shōjo ririka runanoha The mūbī 1 st	
January 23	Yu-Gi-Oh!: Bonds Beyond Time	Gallop	Kenichi Takeshita	49	Gekijō-ban Yū ☆ gi ☆ Ō ~ chō yūgō! Jikū o koeta kizuna ~	
February 6	The Disappearance of Haruhi Suzumiya	Kyoto Animation	Tatsuya Ishihara (chief); Yasuhiro Takemoto	161	Suzumiya haruhi no shōshitsu	
February 18	Welcome to the Space Show	A-1 Pictures	Koji Masunari	136	Uchū shō e yōkoso	
February 27	Keroro Gunso the Super Movie: Creation! Ultimate Keroro, Wonder Space-Time Island	Sunrise	Junichi Satō (chief); Susumu Yamaguchi	74	Chō gekijō-ban keroro gunsō tanjō! Kyūkyoku keroro kiseki no jikū shima de arimasu!!	
March 6	Doraemon: Nobita's Great Battle of the Mermaid King	Shin-Ei Animation	Kōzō Kusuba	99	Eiga Doraemon Nobita no ningyo dai kaisen	
March 6	Time of Eve: The Movie	Studio Rikka	Yasuhiro Yoshiura	106	Ivu no jikan	
March 13	Eden of The East: Paradise Lost	Production I.G	Kenji Kamiyama	92	Higashi no eden gekijō-ban II Paradise Lost	
March 20	Pretty Cure All Stars DX2: Kibō no Hikari— Rainbow Jewel o Mamore!	Toei Animation	Takashi Otsuka	70	Eiga purikyua ōru sutāzu DX 2 kibō no hikari ☆ reinbō jueru o mamore!	
April 2	Trigun: Badlands Rumble	Madhouse	Satoshi Nishimura	90	Toraigan	
April 17	Crayon Shin-chan: Super-Dimension! The Storm Called My Bride	Shin-Ei Animation	Akira Shigino	100	Kureyon shin-chan chō jikū! Arashi o yobu ora no hanayome	
April 17	Detective Conan: The Lost Ship in the Sky	Tokyo Movie Shinsha	Yasuichiro Yamamoto	102	Meitantei konan tenkū no nanbasen	
April 24	Gintama: The Movie	Sunrise	Shinji Takamatsu	95	Gekijō-ban Gintama shin'yaku benisakura-hen	
May 1	Book Girl	Production I.G	Shunsuke Tada	100	Gekijō-ban "bungaku shōjo"	
May 11	Junod	Studio Hibari	Shinichiro Kimura	64	Junō	
May 22	Planzet	CoMix Wave Films	Jun Awazu	53	Puranzetto	
May 29	Broken Blade	Production I.G; Xebec	Tetsuro Amino (Chief); Nobuyoshi Habara	51	Bureiku bureido kakusei no koku	
June 5	Hetalia Axis Powers: Paint it, White	Studio Deen	Bob Shirohata	80	Ginmaku hetaria Axis Powers peinto it, White (shiroku nure!)	
June 26	Broken Blade 2	Production I.G; Xebec	Tetsuro Amino (Chief); Nobuyoshi Habara	51	Bureiku bureido ketsubetsu no michi	
July 10	Pokémon: Zoroark: Master of Illusions	OLM	Kunihiko Yuyama	96	Poketto monsutā daiyamondo & pāru gen'ei no hasha zoroāku	
July 17	Anne of Green Gables: Road to Green Gables	Nippon Animation	Isao Takahata	99	Akage no an gurīngē buruzu e no michi	
July 17	Arrietty	Studio Ghibli	Hiromasa Yonebayashi	94	Karigurashi no arietti	
July 17	Young Alive!: iPS Cells for a New Future	Madhouse	Tai Kase	90	Yangu Alive! ~ IPS saibō ga hiraku mirai ~	
July 31	Hutch the Honeybee	Tatsunoko Production	Tetsuro Amino	100	Konchū monogatari mitsubachihatchi ~ yūki no merodi ~	
July 31	Naruto Shippuden the Movie: The Lost Tower	Pierrot	Masahiko Murata	85	Gekijō-ban naruto - naruto - shippuden za rosuto tawā	
August 21	Colorful	Ascension; Sunrise	Keiichi Hara	127	Karafuru	
August 21	Metal Fight Beyblade vs the Sun: Sol Blaze, the Scorching Hot Invader	SynergySP	Kunihisa Sugishima	76	Gekijō-ban metaru faito beiburēdo VS taiyō ~ shakunetsu no shinryaku-sha soru bureizu ~	
August 28	Loups=Garous	Production I.G; Trans Arts	Junichi Fujisaku	98	Rū = garū kihi subeki ōkami	
September 11	Kowarekake no Orgel	Actas	Keiichiro Kawaguchi	30	Koware kake no orugōru	
September 18	Mobile Suit Gundam 00 the Movie: A Wakening of the Trailblazer	Sunrise	Seiji Mizushima	120	Gekijō-ban kidō senshi Gandamu 00 - A wakening of the Trailblazer -	
September 25	Broken Blade 3	Production I.G; Xebec	Tetsuro Amino (Chief); Nobuyoshi Habara	47	Bureiku bureido daisanshō kyōjin no ato	
October 8	Mardock Scramble: The First Compression	GoHands	Susumu Kudo	69	Marudoukku sukuranburu asshuku	
October 30	Broken Blade 4	Production I.G; Xebec	Tetsuro Amino (Chief); Nobuyoshi Habara	49	Bureiku bureido daiyonshō sanka no ji	
October 30	Heart Catch Pretty Cure! The Movie: Fashion Show in Paris!	Toei Animation	Rie Matsumoto	73	Eiga hāto kyatchi puri kyua! Hana no miyako de fasshon shō desu ka!?	
December 4	Bleach: Hell Verse	Pierrot	Noriyuki Abe	94	Gekijō-ban burīchi jigoku-hen	
December 23	Inazuma Eleven: Saikyō Gundan Ōga Shūrai	OLM	Yoshikazu Miyao	90	Gekijō-ban inazuma irebun saikyō gundan ōga shūrai	
December 25	Fafner: Heaven and Earth	Xebec	Takashi Noto (Chief); Toshimasa Suzuki	92	Sōkyū no fafunā Dead Aggressor hevun AND āsu	

=== Television series ===
A list of anime television series that debuted between January 1 and December 31, 2010.

First run start and end dates	Title	Episodes	Studio	Director	Alternate title	Ref
January 2 – March 27	Cobra the Animation	13	Magic Bus	Keizō Shimizu	COBRA THE ANIMATION	
January 4 – March 22	Chu-Bra!!	12	Zexcs	Yukina Hiiro	Chi ~yu bura!!	
January 5 – March 23	Ladies versus Butlers!	12	Xebec	Atsushi Ōtsuki	Rede~i × bato!	
January 5 – March 23	Sound of the Sky	12	A-1 Pictures	Mamoru Kanbe	So ra no o to	
January 5 – June 29	Gyagu Manga Biyori+	12	Studio Deen	Akitarō Daichi	Masuda kōsuke gekijō gyagu manga biyori+	
January 7 – March 25	Omamori Himari	12	Zexcs	Shinji Ushiro	Omamori himari	
January 7 – April 1	Baka and Test	13	SILVER LINK.	Shin Ōnuma	Baka to tesuto to shōkanjū	
January 7 – April 1	Dance in the Vampire Bund	12	Shaft	Masahiro Sonoda; Akiyuki Simbo	Dansu in za vuanpaia bando	
January 8 – March 26	Hidamari Sketch × Hoshimittsu	12	Shaft	Kenichi Ishikura; Akiyuki Simbo	Hidamari suketchi × ☆ ☆ ☆	
January 8 – March 26	Ōkami Kakushi	12	AIC	Yoshihiro Takamoto	Ookami kakushi	
January 8 – June 25	Durarara!!	24	Brain's Base	Takahiro Ōmori	Deyurarara!!	
January 9 – March 27	Kaitou Reinya	12	Stingray	Something Yoshimatsu	Kaitō rēnya	
January 10 – April 4	Unko-san: Tsuiteru Hito ni Shika Mienai Yousei Junjou Ha	13	Kachidoki Studio		Unko-san tsui teru hito ni shika mienai yōsei junjō-ha	
January 10 – June 20	The Qwaser of Stigmata	24	Hoods Entertainment	Hiraku Kaneko	Seikon no kueisā	
January 11 – March 29	Hanamaru Kindergarten	12	Gainax	Seiji Mizushima	Hanamaru yōchien	
January 12 – April 1, 2011	Keshikasu-kun	44	Shogakukan Music & Digital Entertainment	Takao Kato	Keshikasu-kun	
January 15 – March 26	Nodame Cantabile: Finale	11	J.C.Staff	Chiaki Kon	No dame kantābire fināre	
January 26 – December 11	Katanagatari	12	White Fox	Keitaro Motonaga	Ken-go	
February 7 – January 30, 2011	HeartCatch PreCure!	49	Toei Animation	Tatsuya Nagamine	Hāto kyatchi purikyua!	
March 2 – March 5, 2011	Bakugan Battle Brawlers: New Vestroia	52	TMS Entertainment	Mitsuo Hashimoto	Bakugan batoru burōrāzu nyū Vestroia	
March 20 – August 20	Doubutsu Kankyou Kaigi	20	Studio Deen	Junji Nishimura	Dōbutsu kan kyō kaigi	
March 20 – March 22, 2011	Marie & Gali ver. 2.0	30	Toei Animation	Kōhei Kureta; Yukio Kaizawa	Marī & garī ver. 2. 0	
March 26 – June 11	Ikki Tousen: Xtreme Xecutor	12	TNK	Kōichi Ōhata	Ikkitōsen Xtreme Xecutor	
March 26 – June 17	Shin Koihime Musō: Otome Tairan	12	Doga Kobo	Nobuaki Nakanishi	Ma kohime† musō ~ otome tairan ~	
March 29 –	Hanakappa		OLM; Xebec	Kazumi Nonaka	Hana kappa	
April 1 – May 31	Ketsuinu	13	Toei Animation	Haruki Kasugamori	Ketsu inu	
April 1 – September 23	Heroman	26	Bones	Hitoshi Nanba	Hīrōman	
April 2 – June 17	Ring ni Kakero 1: Kage Dou-hen	6	Toei Animation	Toshiaki Komura	Ringu ni kakero 1 kage-dō-hen	
April 2 – June 18	B Gata H Kei	12	HAL Film Maker	Yūsuke Yamamoto	Bī taipu H shirīzu	
April 2 – September 24	Maid Sama!	26	J.C.Staff	Hiroaki Sakurai	Kaichō ha meido sama	
April 2 – June 25	Ōkiku Furikabutte: Natsu no Taikai-hen	13	A-1 Pictures	Tsutomu Mizushima	Ōkiku furikabutte 〜 natsu no taikai-hen 〜	
April 3 – June 19	Demon King Daimao	12	Artland	Takashi Watanabe	Ichiban ushiro no daimaō	
April 3 – June 26	Angel Beats!	13	P.A. Works	Seiji Kishi	Enjeru bītsu!	
April 3 – September 25	Major (Season 6)	25	SynergySP	Riki Fukushima	Mejā dai 6 shirīzu	
April 3 – March 19, 2011	SD Gundam Sangokuden Brave Battle Warriors	51	Sunrise	Kenichi Suzuki; Kunihiro Mori	Esudī gandamu sangokuden Brave batoru Warriors	
April 3 – March 26, 2011	Duel Masters Cross Shock	50	Shogakukan Music & Digital Entertainment	Waruo Suzuki	Deyueru masutāzu kurosu shokku	
April 3 – March 26, 2011	Penguin no Mondai MAX	50	Shogakukan Music & Digital Entertainment		Pengin'nomondai Max	
April 3 – April 2, 2011	Jewelpet Twinkle	52	Studio Comet	Takashi Yamamoto	Juerupetto tinkuru ☆	
April 3 – April 10, 2011	Gokujō! Mecha Mote Iinchō Second Collection	51	Shogakukan Music & Digital Entertainment	Masatsugu Arakawa	Gokujō!! Mecha mote iinchō sekando korekushon	
April 4 – June 20	Hakuōki	12	Studio Deen	Osamu Yamasaki	Hakuōki	
April 4 – June 27	Working!!	13	A-1 Pictures	Yoshimasa Hiraike	Wākingu!!	
April 4 – September 26	Giant Killing	26	Studio Deen	Yuu Kou	Jaianto kiringu	
April 4 – March 27, 2011	Beyblade: Metal Masters	51	SynergySP	Kunihisa Sugishima	Metaru faito beiburēdo ~ baku ~	
April 4 – March 27, 2011	Lilpri	51	TMS Entertainment	Makoto Moriwaki	Hime chen! Oto gichikku aidoru rirupuri~tsu	
April 5 – June 21	Kissxsis	12	feel.	Munenori Nawa	Kisushisu	
April 5 – June 28	Arakawa Under the Bridge	13	Shaft	Yukihiro Miyamoto; Akiyuki Simbo	Arakawa andā za burijji	
April 5 – March 26, 2012	Shimajirou Hesoka	99	Pierrot Plus	Akari Shigino	Shimajirō Hesoka	
April 6 – June 29	Mayoi Neko Overrun!	13	AIC	Akitarō Daichi; Junichi Satō; Keizō Kusakawa; Kenichi Yatagai; Manabu Ono; Michio Fukuda; Rion Kujo; Shin Itagaki; Takashi Ikehata; Takuya Satō; Tomohiro Hirata; Yoshimasa Hiraike	Mayoi neko ōbāran!	
April 6 – June 29	Night Raid 1931	13	A-1 Pictures	Jun Matsumoto	Senkō no naito reido	
April 7 – September 29	K-On!!	26	Kyoto Animation	Naoko Yamada	Ke ion!!	
April 7 – September 29	Rainbow: Nisha Rokubō no Shichinin	26	Madhouse	Hiroshi Koujina	Rainbow: Nisha Rokubou no Shichinin	
April 12 – September 20	The Betrayal Knows My Name	24	J.C.Staff	Katsushi Sakurabi	Uragiri ha boku no namae wo shitteiru	
April 16 – July 2	House of Five Leaves	12	Manglobe	Tomomi Mochizuki	Sarai-ya Goyō	
April 23 – July 2	The Tatami Galaxy	11	Madhouse	Masaaki Yuasa	Yojouhan Shinwa Taikei	
July 1 – September 16	Okami-san and Her Seven Companions	12	J.C.Staff	Yoshiaki Iwasaki	Ōkami-san to nana-ri no nakama-tachi	
July 2 – September 17	Black Butler (season 2)	12	A-1 Pictures	Hirofumi Ogura	Kuro shitsuji II	
July 2 – December 17	The Legend of the Legendary Heroes	24	Zexcs	Itsurō Kawasaki	Densetsu no yūsha no densetsu	
July 2 – December 24	Amagami SS	25	AIC	Yoshimasa Hiraike	Amagami SS	
July 3 – September 18	Shukufuku no Campanella	12	AIC	Shinji Ushiro	Shukufuku no kanpanera	
July 3 – September 26	Mitsudomoe	13	Bridge	Masahiko Ōta	Mitsudomo e	
July 4 – September 26	Seitokai Yakuindomo	13	GoHands	Hiromitsu Kanazawa	Seitokai yakuindomo	
July 4 – September 26	Sekirei: Pure Engagement	13	Seven Arcs	Keizō Kusakawa	Sekirei ~ pyua Engagement ~	
July 5 – September 20	Highschool of the Dead	12	Madhouse	Tetsuro Araki	Gakuen mokushiroku haisukūru obu za deddo	
July 6 – September 21	Tono to Issho: Ippunkan Gekijou	12	Gathering	Mankyū	Tonotoissho 1-funkan gekijō	
July 6 – September 28	Occult Academy	13	A-1 Pictures	Tomohiko Ito	Seikimatsu okaruto gakuin	
July 6 – December 21	Nura: Rise of the Yokai Clan	24	Studio Deen	Junji Nishimura	Nurarihyon'no mago	
July 6 – March 8, 2011	Digimon Fusion	30	Toei Animation	Tetsuya Endō	Dejimon kurosuu ōzu	
July 6 – March 8, 2011	Stitch: Season 3	29	Shin-Ei Animation	Tetsuo Yasumi	Sutitchi!~ Zutto saikō no tomodachi ~	
July 8 – September 23	Strike Witches 2	12	AIC Spirits	Kazuhiro Takamura	Sutoraikuu~itchīzu 2	
July 9 – December 31	Shiki	22	Daume	Tetsuro Amino	Shikabane oni	
July 11 – September 26	Asobi ni Iku yo!	12	AIC PLUS+	Yōichi Ueda	Asobi nī kuyo!	
July 11 – September 26	Sengoku Basara II	12	Production I.G	Kazuya Nomura	Sengoku basara Ni	
August 9 – March 29, 2011	Scan2Go	52	SynergySP	Mitsuo Hashimoto	Sukyan 2-kō	
August 23 – November 16	Kkoma Bus Tayo	26	Iconix Entertainment; Studio Gale		Chibi basu tayō 1	
September 4 – December 20	Hyakka Ryōran Samurai Girls	12	Arms	KOBUN	Hyakka ryōran samurai gāruzu	
September 12 – September 11, 2011	Battle Spirits: Brave	50	Sunrise	Akira Nishimori	Batoru supirittsu bureivu	
September 23 – June 14, 2012	Pokemon Best Wishes!	84	OLM	Kunihiko Yuyama (Chief); Norihiko Sudo	Poketto monsutā besuto uisshu	
October 1 – December 17	Iron Man	12	Madhouse	Yūzō Satō	Aian man	
October 2 – December 18	Heaven's Lost Property: Forte	12	AIC ASTA	Hisashi Saito	Sora no oto shimo no f (forute)	
October 2 – December 18	MM!	12	Xebec	Tsuyoshi Nagasawa	E muemu~tsu!	
October 2 – December 25	Panty & Stocking with Garterbelt	13	Gainax	Hiroyuki Imaishi	Panti & sutokkingu uizu gātāberuto	
October 2 – April 2, 2011	Bakuman	25	J.C.Staff	Kenichi Kasai; Noriaki Akitaya	Bakuman.	
October 2 – April 2, 2011	Super Robot Wars Original Generation: The Inspector	26	Asahi Production	Masami Ōbari	Sūpā robotto taisen OG - ji insupekutā -	
October 3 – December 19	Oreimo	12	AIC Build	Hiroyuki Kanbe	Ore no imōto ga kon'nani kawaii wake ga nai	
October 3 – December 26	Psychic Detective Yakumo	13	Bee Train	Tomoyuki Kurokawa	Shinrei tantei yakumo	
October 3 – December 26	Yumeiro Patissiere SP Professional	13	Studio Hibari	Iku Suzuki	Yumeiro patishiēru SP (supesharu) purofesshonaru	
October 3 – March 26, 2011	Tegami Bachi Reverse	25	Pierrot Plus	Akira Iwanaga	Tegami bachi REVERSE	
October 3 – April 3, 2011	Star Driver	25	Bones	Takuya Igarashi	Sutā DRIVER kagayaki no takuto	
October 4 – October 29	Miyanishi Tatsuya Gekijō: Omae Umasō da na	20	Ajia-do	Masaharu Takizawa	Miyanishi tatsuya gekijō omae uma-sōda na	
October 4 – December 6	Hakuouki: Hekketsuroku	10	Studio Deen	Osamu Yamasaki	Hakuōki hekketsu-roku	
October 4 – December 20	Yosuga no Sora	12	feel.	Takeo Takahashi	Yosuga no sora	
October 4 – December 27	Arakawa Under the Bridge *2	13	Shaft	Yukihiro Miyamoto; Akiyuki Simbo	Arakawa andā zaburijji × burijji	
October 5 – December 21	Squid Girl	12	Diomedéa	Tsutomu Mizushima	Shinryaku! Ikako	
October 5 – December 28	Otome Yōkai Zakuro	13	J.C.Staff	Chiaki Kon	Otome yōkai zakuro	
October 6 – December 22	Motto To Love-Ru	12	Xebec	Atsushi Ōtsuki	Motto To LOVEru - tora buru -	
October 7 – December 23	Tantei Opera Milky Holmes	12	J.C.Staff	Makoto Moriwaki	Tantei opera mirukyi hōmuzu	
October 7 – December 23	The World God Only Knows	12	Manglobe	Shigehito Takayanagi	Kami nomi zo shiru sekai	
October 8 – December 23	Togainu no Chi	12	A-1 Pictures	Naoyuki Konno	Togainu no chi	
October 8 – December 24	And Yet the Town Moves	12	Shaft	Akiyuki Simbo	Soredemo machi ha mawatteiru	
October 8 – April 1, 2011	A Certain Magical Index II	24	J.C.Staff	Hiroshi Nishikiori	Toaru majutsu no kinsho mokuroku II	
October 9 – December 25	Fortune Arterial: Akai Yakusoku	12	feel.; Zexcs	Munenori Nawa	Fōchun'ateriaru akai yakusoku	
October 15 – December 31	Princess Jellyfish	11	Brain's Base	Takahiro Ōmori	Umi tsukihime	
November 26 – September 14, 2012	Shin-Men	13	Shin-Ei Animation	Masaaki Yuasa	SHIN-MEN	
December 11 – February 26, 2011	Haiyore! Nyaruko: Remember My Mr. Lovecraft	11	DLE	Azuma Tani	Hai yoru! Nyaruani rimenbā Mai rabu (kurafuto sensei)	

=== Original net animations ===
A list of original net animations that debuted between January 1 and December 31, 2010.

First run start and end dates	Title	Episodes	Studio	Director	Alternate title	Ref
March 14	Reborn! Here Comes a Vongola Family-Style School Trip!	1	Artland	Kenichi Imaizumi	Katei kyōshi Hittoman ribon! Bongore famirī sō tōjō! Bongore-shiki shūgakuryokō, kuru!!	
March 26 – March 11, 2011	Hetalia World Series	48	Studio Deen	Bob Shirohata	Hetaria World Series	
April 7	Hipira-kun ONA	2	Sunrise		Hipira-kun	
May 14	Nanchatte!	2	Shin-Ei Animation		Nanchatte!	
May 17 – September 4	Potecco Babies	2	Shin-Ei Animation		Potekko beibīzu	
June 2	Susume! Gachimuchi Sankyoudai	1	TMS Entertainment		Susume! Gachimuchi 3 kyōdai	
July 17	Cat Shit One	1	Anima	Kazuya Sasahara	Kyatto shitto wan	
July 24 – September 24	Ginga Tetsudou 999: Jikuu wo Koeta Energy no Tabi	5	Toei Animation		Ginga tetsudō 999 jikū o koeta enerugī no tabi	
August 12 – February 10, 2012	Joshikousei Nobunaga-chan!!	10	MooGoo; Studio Ranmaru; WAO World	Hiroshi Kubo	Mesukōsei Nobunaga-chan!!	
August 29	Baka to Test to Shoukanjuu: Matsuri - Sentaku ni Yotte Tenkai ga Kawaru "LIPS Eizou"	1	SILVER LINK.	Shin Ōnuma	Baka to tesuto toshōkanjū ~-sai ~ sentaku ni yotte tenkai ga kawaru 'rippusu eizō'	
September 17 – April 1, 2014	Agukaru	5	Studio PuYUKAI	Minoru Ashina	A gukaru	
September 24	Ichirin-sha	1	Nomad	Ushio Tazawa	Raundā ichirin-sha	
December 23 – June 16, 2011	Starry☆Sky	26	Studio Deen	Yoshihiro Takamoto	Suta ☆ suka	

=== Original video animations ===
A list of original video animations that debuted between January 1 and December 31, 2010.

First run start and end dates	Title	Episodes	Studio	Director	Alternate title	Ref
January 17	Fate/stay night TV Reproduction	2	Studio Deen		Fate/stay night	
February 11	Issho ni Sleeping: Sleeping with Hinako	1	Studio Hibari	Shinichiro Kimura	Issho ni suri ̄ pingu	
February 11	Quiz Magic Academy: The Original Animation 2	1	AIC PLUS+	Keitaro Motonaga	Kuizu majikku akademī ~ orijinaru animēshon 2 ~	
February 23 – June 23, 2014	Yondemasuyo, Azazel-san	4	Production I.G	Tsutomu Mizushima	Yondemasu yo, Azazeru-san.	
February 26	Mudazumo Naki Kaikaku	3	TYO Animations	Tsutomu Mizushima	Mudadzumo naki kaikaku	
March 12 – June 6, 2014	Mobile Suit Gundam Unicorn	7	Sunrise	Kazuhiro Furuhashi	Kidō senshi Gandamu UC (yunikōn)	
March 17	Haiyoru! Nyaruani	9	DLE	Azuma Tani	Hai yoru! Nyaruani	
March 17	One Piece Recap	1	Toei Animation		Wan pīsu	
March 17	Shin Koihime†Musou: Live Revolution	1	Doga Kobo	Nobuaki Nakanishi	Ma kohime† musō raivu revuoryūshon	
March 24	Ookiku Furikabutte: Natsu no Scorebook	2	A-1 Pictures		Ōkiku furikabutte	
March 25	Ashiaraiyashiki no Juunin-tachi.	1	GARDEN LODGE	Yoshihide Ibata	Ashiaraiyashiki no jūnintachi	
March 25	Tono to Issho	1	Gathering	Mankyū	Tono to issho	
March 25 – February 25, 2011	Tales of Symphonia: The Animation Tethe'alla Episode	4	ufotable	Haruo Sotozaki	Teiruzu obu shinfonia THE animēshon teseara-hen	
March 26 – October 27	Soukou Kihei Votoms: Genei-hen	6	Sunrise	Ryousuke Takahashi	Sōkō kihei botomuzu gen'ei-hen	
April 2	GA: Geijutsuka Art Design Class - Aozora ga Kakitai	1	AIC PLUS+		GA geijutsu-ka āto dezain kurasu aozora ga kakitai	
April 14	Detective Conan: Kid in Trap Island	1	TMS Entertainment	Kōjin Ochi	Meitantei konan ~ kiddo in torappu ISLAND ~	
April 16	One Piece Film: Strong World Episode 0	1	Toei Animation	Naoyuki Itō	Wan pīsu firumu sutorongu wārudo episōdo zero	
April 16	Peeping Life: The Perfect Emotion	10	CoMix Wave Films	Ryōichi Mori	Peeping Life (pīpingu raifu) - The Perfect Emotion -	
April 16	Zettai Karen Children: Gentei Kaikin!! OVA Chou Sakidori Special!!	1	SynergySP	Keiichiro Kawaguchi	Zettai karen chirudoren gentei kaikin!! Ovua chō sakidori supesharu!!	
April 17	Detective Conan Magic File 4: Osaka Okonomiyaki Odyssey	1	Tokyo Movie	Yasuichiro Yamamoto	Meitantei konan MAGIC FILE 4 ~ Ōsaka okonomiyaki odessei ~	
April 22	Peeban	6	GARDEN LODGE		Pīban	
April 23	Chi's Sweet Home: Chi to Kocchi, Deau.	1	Madhouse	Morio Asaka	Chīzu suīto hōmu chī to kotchi, deau.	
April 23 – March 9, 2011	xxxHOLiC Rou	2	Production I.G	Tsutomu Mizushima	XxxHOLiC no ori	
April 26	Nodame Cantabile Finale OVA	1	J.C.Staff		No dame kantābire ovua 2	
April 28	Super Street Fighter IV	1	Gonzo	Fuminori Kizaki	Sūpā sutorīto faitā IV	
May 25	Hetalia Axis Powers Fan Disc	1	Studio Deen		Hetaria Axis Powers fan disuku	
June 10	Himitsukessha Taka no Tsume The Movie 4: Kaspersky wo Motsu Otoko	1	DLE	Ryo Ono	Himitsukessha taka no tsume THE mūbī 4 〜 kasuperusukī o motsu otoko 〜	
June 25 – October 23	Kyō, Koi o Hajimemasu	2	J.C.Staff	Shigeyasu Yamauchi	Kyō, koi o hajimemasu	
June 25 – December 24	Book Girl Memoir	3	Production I.G	Shunsuke Tada	"Bungaku shōjo" memowāru	
June 27 – June 22, 2011	Black Lagoon: Roberta's Blood Trail	5	Madhouse	Sunao Katabuchi	BLACK LAGOON Roberta's Blood Trail	
July 2 – December 3	Kure-nai	2	Brain's Base		Reddo ovu~a	
July 6	Je T'aime	1	Production I.G	Mamoru Oshii	Je t'aime	
July 6	Moyashimon CGI Anime	1	Shirogumi		Moyashi mon	
July 7	Shin Koihime†Musou: Gunyuu, Minami no Shima de Bakansu wo Suru no Koto - Ato, Porori mo Aru yo!	1	Doga Kobo		Ma kohime† musō gun'yū, minami no shima de bakansu o suru no koto ~ ato, porori mo aru yo! ~	
July 16	Zettai Karen Children OVA: Aitazousei! Ubawareta Mirai?	1	SynergySP	Keiichiro Kawaguchi	Zettai karen chirudoren ovu~a 〜 aitazōsei! Ubawareta mirai?〜	
July 23 – March 23, 2011	Hen Semi	2	Xebec	Ryouki Kamitsubo	Hen zemi	
July 24	Black Rock Shooter	1	Ordet	Shinobu Yoshioka	Burakku ★ rokkushūtā	
July 24	Toaru Kagaku no Railgun: Entenka no Satsuei Model mo Raku Ja Arimasen wa ne.	1	J.C.Staff		Toaru kagaku no rērugan (rērugan) 13'-banashi "entenka no satsuei moderu mo raku jaarimasen wa ne. "	
July 30 – November 17	Aki Sora: Yume no Naka	2	Hoods Entertainment	Takeo Takahashi	Aki sora ~ yume no uchi ~	
August 8 – March 14, 2011	Queen's Blade: Beautiful Warriors	6	Arms	Kinji Yoshimoto	Kuīnzu bureido utsukushiki tōshi-tachi	
August 16	Robotica*Robotics	1	CoMix Wave Films	Soubi Yamamoto	Robotika* robotikusu	
August 16 – May 11, 2012	Kuttsukiboshi	2	Primastea	Naoya Ishikawa	Kuttsuki boshi	
August 27	Loups=Garous #Overture	2	Production I.G		Rū = garū# ōbāchua	
August 27	Prism Magical: Prism Generations!	1	Asahi Production	Masami Ōbari	Purizumu ☆ ma ~ji karu purizumu jenerēshonzu!	
September 6 – December 6	Tamayura	4	HAL Film Maker	Junichi Satō	Tamayura	
September 9	Sora no Otoshimono: Project Pink	1	AIC ASTA	Hisashi Saito	Sora no oto shimo no purojekuto tōgenkyō [pinku]	
September 17	Kami nomi zo Shiru Sekai: Flag 0	1	Manglobe		Kami nomi zo shiru sekai: Furagu 0	
September 23 – December 22	To Heart 2 AD Next	2	Chaos Project	Junichi Sakata	ToHeart2 adnext	
September 26	Toaru Kagaku no Railgun: Misaka-san wa Ima Chuumoku no Mato desu kara	1	J.C.Staff	Tatsuyuki Nagai	Toaru kagaku no rērugan Misaka-san wa ima chūmoku no-tekidesukara	
October 8 – November 9, 2011	Yozakura Quartet: Hoshi no Umi	3	Purple Cow Studio Japan; Tatsunoko Production	Ryo-timo	Yozakura shijūsō ~ hoshi no umi ~	
October 20	The Qwaser of Stigmata: Portrait of the Empress	1	Hoods Entertainment	Hiraku Kaneko	Seikon no kueisā nyotei no shōzō	
October 28	D.C. I&II P.S.P. Re-Animated	1	Zexcs	Shinji Ushiro	D.C.I&II P.S.P. RE-ANIMATED	
November 6	Armored Trooper Votoms: Case; Irvine	1	Sunrise	Shishō Igarashi	Sōkō kihei botomuzu Case; IRVINE	
November 11	Dragon Ball Z: Plan to Eradicate the Super Saiyans	1	Toei Animation	Yoshihiro Ueda	Doragon bōru chō saiyahito zetsumetsu keikaku	
November 17	Mahou Sensei Negima!: Mou Hitotsu no Sekai Extra - Mahou Shoujo Yue♥	1	Shaft; Studio Pastoral	Akiyuki Simbo (Chief); Tatsufumi Itō	Mahō sensei negima mō hitotsu no sekai Extra mahō shōjo Yue ♥	
November 17 – May 11, 2011	Koe de Oshigoto!	2	Studio Gokumi	Naoto Hosoda	Koe de oshigoto! The animēshon	
November 17 – June 17, 2011	Air Gear: Kuro no Hane to Nemuri no Mori - Break on the Sky	3	Satelight	Shinji Ishihira	Ea Gia kuro no hane to nemurinomori - bureiku on the Sky -	
November 22	G-Taste (2010)	1	AIC PLUS+	Katsuhiko Nishijima	G - Best - jīteisuto besuto serekushon -	
November 25	Megane na Kanojo	4	AIC Takarazuka	Kōji Itō	Megane na kanojo	
November 26	Mayo Elle Otokonoko	1	Actas	Keiichiro Kawaguchi	Elle Otoko no musume	
November 27	Koi☆Sento	1	Sunrise	Shuhei Morita	Koi ☆ sento	
November 27 – April 7, 2011	Mazinkaiser SKL	3	Actas	Jun Kawagoe	Majinkaizā SKL	
December 4	Votoms Finder Armored Trooperoid	1	Sunrise	Atsushi Shigeta	Botomuzu faindā	
December 9	The Future Diary OVA	1	asread.	Naoto Hosoda	Miku nikki	
December 9 – October 7, 2011	Princess Resurrection	3	Tatsunoko Production	Keiichiro Kawaguchi	Kaibutsu ōjo	
December 17	Major: Message	1	SynergySP	Riki Fukushima	Mejā messēji	
December 18	Yuri Seijin Naoko-san	1	ufotable	Tetsuya Takeuchi	Yuri seijin'naoko-san	
December 21 – August 19, 2014	Ghost Messenger	2	Studio Animal		Gōsuto messenjā	
December 24	Issho ni Training Ofuro: Bathtime with Hinako & Hiyoko	1	Studio Hibari	Shinichiro Kimura	Issho ni tore ningu 026 [o furo] BATHTIME WITH HINAKO& HIYOKO	
December 25	Goulart Knights: Evoked the Beginning Black	1	Studio Blanc.	Masahiro Sonoda	Gurāru kishi-dan Evoked the Beginning Black	
December 28 – April 3, 2012	Hime Gal Paradise	9	SynergySP		Hime gyaru ♥ paradaisu	

== Deaths ==
=== January ===
- January 17: Daisuke Gōri, Japanese voice actor (voice of Heihachi Mishima in Tekken), dies at age 57 from suicide.

== See also ==
- 2010 in animation
