= 2010 in animation =

2010 in animation is an overview of notable events, including notable awards, list of films released, television show debuts and endings, and notable deaths.

== Events ==
=== January ===
- January 3: The Simpsons' 450th episode "Thursdays with Abie" premieres on Fox, guest starring famed author Mitch Albom as himself. The episode was seen by over 8.5 million viewers that night.

=== February ===
- February 15: The Penguins of Madagascar concludes its first season on Nickelodeon with the half-hour special "Dr. Blowhole's Revenge". The season's finale was seen by nearly 4 million viewers that night.
- February 16: The Scooby-Doo direct-to-video film Scooby-Doo! Abracadabra-Doo is released on DVD.

=== March ===
- March 7: 82nd Academy Awards:
  - For the second time in the history of the Academy of Motion Picture Arts and Sciences, an animated feature film is nominated for Best Picture but loses: Up by Pete Docter. However, it did win the Academy Award for Best Animated Feature and the Academy Award for Best Original Score (by Michael Giacchino).
  - Logorama by Nicolas Schmerkin wins the Academy Award for Best Animated Short Film.
- March 13: Season 2 of The Penguins of Madagascar begins on Nickelodeon with the premiere of the episodes "The Red Squirrel/It's About Time". The season's premiere was seen by over 4 million viewers that morning.
- March 17: Season 14 of South Park begins on Comedy Central with the premiere of the episode "Sexual Healing". This was the first episode to premiere in the 2010s.
- March 25: The SpongeBob SquarePants episode "One Coarse Meal" premieres on Nickelodeon, fans of the show consider this episode to be the worst one in the entire series due to Mr. Krabs constantly scaring Plankton to the point where the copepod tries to commit suicide.
- March 26: The DreamWorks film How to Train Your Dragon premieres in theaters to critical acclaim by both fans & critics.

=== April ===
- April 5:
  - The first episode of Adventure Time is broadcast, gaining generally positive attention. This is the first Cartoon Network original series outside Adult Swim to perceive the LGBT representation in general.
  - The first episode of Scooby-Doo! Mystery Incorporated airs on Cartoon Network as a sneak peek (officially premiered on July 12th). This marks the first in the pre-2023 Scooby-Doo series where one of the original characters comes out.
- April 6: Total Drama Action airs its final episode on Cartoon Network in the united states, thus concluding the second season series of Total Drama.
- April 7: Cartoon Network already renews Adventure Time for a second season due to its instant & high-rated success.
- April 14: The South Park episode "200" is broadcast, which portrays Muhammad, though as a censored image. The episode leads to serious controversy, riots and death threats.
- April 21: The South Park episode "201" is broadcast, which continues the Muhammad storyline from "200" but is notably censored, with several lines of dialogue muted. It was revealed in this episode that Scott Tenorman's father, Jack Tenorman was also Cartman's biological father (who Cartman killed & fed him to Scott back in Season 5's "Scott Tenorman Must Die", along with Scott's mother).
  - After their broadcast, both episodes are pulled from syndication, removed from the series' website, and unaired outside the United States.
- April 25: South Park is banned in Sri Lanka due to controversy over the episode "200", which depicted Gautama Buddha snorting cocaine.

=== May ===
- May 3: The first episode of Everything's Rosie airs.
- May 6: After more than 12 years of being on the air, King of the Hill aired its final episode in syndication.
- May 16: American Dad! concludes its sixth season on Fox with the episode "Great Space Roaster". The finale was seen by just nearly 5.9 million viewers that night.
- May 20: Shrek receives a star at the Hollywood Walk of Fame.
- May 23:
  - The Simpsons concludes its 21st season on Fox with the episode "Judge Me Tender", which includes the following guest stars: Simon Cowell, Randy Jackson, Ellen DeGeneres, Kara DioGuardi, Ryan Seacrest, & Rupert Murdoch. The finale was seen by over 5.7 million viewers that night.
  - The Cleveland Show concludes its first season on Fox with the episode "You're the Best Man, Cleveland Brown". The finale was seen by over 4.9 million viewers that night.
  - The second episode in the Family Guy Star Wars trilogy parody "Something, Something, Something, Dark Side" premiered on Fox. The episode was seen by just over 6.3 million viewers that night.
- May 21: Shrek Forever After is released.
- May 26: The final episode of Kabouter Wesley is broadcast.

=== June ===
- June 9: Pierre Coffin and Chris Renaud's Despicable Me premieres. The Minions characters will prove so popular that they'll eventually receive a spin-off film 5 years later.
- June 10: Total Drama both concluded its second season (Total Drama Action) and began its third season (Total Drama World Tour) in Canada on Teletoon. Season 3/World Tour later premiered in the US on Cartoon Network on June 21st.
- June 16: Sylvain Chomet's The Illusionist, based on a script by Jacques Tati, is first released.
- June 18: Pixar's Toy Story 3 is released in theaters to critical acclaim and became a hard-earned box-office success.
- June 20: Family Guy concludes its eighth season on BBC Three in the UK with the episode "Partial Terms of Endearment", Fox refused to air this episode & ended up banning it in the US due to the episode's portrayal of abortion, however the episode released on DVD in the US 3 months later. This was also the last episode to be produced in Standard-definition.
- June 24: The Futurama revival premieres on Comedy Central after a seven-year cancellation on Fox. The same evening, another episode, "In-A-Gadda-Da-Leela", premieres, guest starring actor and comedian Chris Elliott.

=== July ===
- July 1: The Futurama episode "Attack of the Killer App" premieres, guest starring actor and comedian Craig Ferguson. The episode also spawned the "shut up and take my money" meme.
- July 8: The Futurama episode "Proposition Infinity" premieres, guest starring actor George Takei. This was his third guest star appearance in the series.
- July 17: Hiromasa Yonebayashi's Arrietty, based on the children's fantasy novel The Borrowers by Mary Norton, is first released.
- July 22: The Futurama episode "Lethal Inspection" premieres, in which Bender must cope with Hermes to help track down the mysterious Inspector 5.
- July 29: The Futurama episode "The Late Philip J. Fry" premieres, in which Professor Farnsworth invents a time machine, which only goes forward in time. The series won its second Emmy Award for Outstanding Animated Program (Programming Less Than One Hour) in 2011 and received critical acclaim.

=== August ===
- August 17: Former Disney and Don Bluth animator Jeffrey J. Varab is arrested for fraud.
- August 19: The Futurama episode "The Prisoner of Benda" premieres, in which Professor Farnsworth and Amy build a machine that allows them to switch minds so that they may each pursue their lifelong dreams. The episode was notable for a theorem created by the episode's writer Ken Keeler that provided a mathematical explanation for how the characters could return to their original bodies.
- August 23: The first episode of Tayo the Little Bus airs.
- August 26: The Futurama episode "Lrrreconcilable Ndndifferences" premieres, guest starring actress Katee Sackhoff, Spanish cartoonist Sergio Aragonés and series creators Matt Groening and David X. Cohen.
- August 28: Disney and Pixar's Toy Story 3 becomes the first animated film to gross over $1 billion.
- August 31: After more than 11 years on the air, Dragon Tales airs for the last time on the PBS Kids block.

=== September ===
- September 6: The first episodes of The Cat in the Hat Knows a Lot About That!, NFL Rush Zone, Regular Show and Mad air.
- September 14: The Scooby-Doo direct-to-video film Scooby-Doo! Camp Scare releases on DVD.
- September 21: Tinker Bell receives a star at the Hollywood Walk of Fame.
- September 26:
  - Season 22 of The Simpsons begins on Fox with the premiere of the episode "Elementary School Musical", which features the following guest stars: Flight of the Conchords (Jemaine Clement and Bret McKenzie), Ira Glass, Stephen Hawking, Lea Michele, Cory Monteith, & Amber Riley. The season's premiere brought in a total of over 7.8 million viewers that night.
  - Season 2 of The Cleveland Show begins on Fox with the premiere of the episode "Harder, Better, Faster, Browner". The season's premiere brought in a total of just over 6.6 million viewers that night.
  - Season 9 of Family Guy begins on Fox with the premiere of the hour-long special "And Then There Were Fewer", the season's premiere brought in a total of over 9.1 million viewers that night. Beginning with this season, episodes would start being produced in High-definition.

=== October ===
- October 2: The first episodes of the Jimmy Neutron spin-off series Planet Sheen and T.U.F.F. Puppy both premiered on Nickelodeon.
- October 3: Season 7 of American Dad! begins on Fox with the premiere of the episode "100 A.D.". The season's premiere brought in a total of over 6.1 million viewers that night.
- October 8: Discovery Kids's preschool block, Ready Set Learn, is discontinued.
- October 10:
  - Discovery Kids relaunched to The Hub.
  - The first episode of My Little Pony: Friendship Is Magic premiered, which becomes an unexpected success.
- October 25: The first episode of Dragons et Princesses is broadcast.

=== November ===
- November 5: The DreamWorks Animation film, Megamind, premieres.
- November 7: Anime producer Yoshinobu Nishizaki drowns at age 75 after falling off the research steamboat Yamato.
- November 8: Film critics protest against MPAA for the irrelevant movie ratings that were given to films years ago, including All Dogs Go to Heaven, The Hunchback of Notre Dame and South Park: Bigger, Longer & Uncut, and urged the association to make their change in the future. After controversies with Cars 2 and Rango in 2011, subsequent films are not rated the same again. G-rating became much less frequently used in family-oriented films.
- November 15: Total Drama World Tour airs its final episode on Cartoon Network in the united states, thus concluding the third season of Total Drama. The season finale later premiered in Canada next year on Teletoon.
- November 17: South Park concludes its 14th season on Comedy Central with the episode "Crème Fraîche". It was seen by over 2.4 million viewers that night.
- November 19: Fernando Trueba, Javier Mariscal and Tono Errando's Chico and Rita premieres.
- November 21:
  - The Family Guy episode "Brian Writes a Bestseller" premieres on Fox, this episode was disliked by fans due to Brian's new self-absorbed ego and harsh treatment towards Stewie. However, the episode ratings were a success, reeling in a total of over 6.5 million viewers that night.
  - The Futurama episode "The Futurama Holiday Spectacular" premieres on Comedy Central, guest starring rapper Coolio and environmentalist Al Gore. This was Coolio's third appearance in the series as Kwanzaabot and Al Gore's fourth appearance in the series.
- November 24: Tangled, the 50th animated feature from Walt Disney Animation Studios, is released.
- November 26: The first episode of Young Justice is broadcast.
- November 29:
  - The first episode of Transformers: Prime is broadcast.
  - Cartoon Network renews Adventure Time for a third season.

=== December ===
- December 15: The film A Cat in Paris by Jean-Loup Felicioli and Alain Gagnol premieres.
- December 17: The live action/animated hybrid film Yogi Bear is released, receiving extremely negative reviews for neglecting the originality from the original Yogi Bear cartoon.

== Awards ==
- Academy Award for Best Animated Feature: Up
- Academy Award for Best Animated Short: Logorama
- Animation Kobe Feature Film Award: The Disappearance of Haruhi Suzumiya
- Annecy International Animated Film Festival Cristal du long métrage: Fantastic Mr. Fox
- Annie Award for Best Animated Feature: How to Train Your Dragon
- Asia Pacific Screen Award for Best Animated Feature Film: Piercing I
- BAFTA Award for Best Animated Film: Toy Story 3
- César Award for Best Animated Film: The Illusionist
- European Film Award for Best Animated Film: The Illusionist
- Goya Award for Best Animated Film: Chico and Rita
- Japan Academy Prize for Animation of the Year: Arrietty
- Japan Media Arts Festival Animation Grand Prize: The Tatami Galaxy
- Mainichi Film Awards - Animation Grand Award: Colorful

== Films released ==
- January 13 - Quantum Quest: A Cassini Space Odyssey (United States)
- January 22:
  - AAA - The Movie (Mexico)
  - Pet Pals: Marco Polo's Code (Italy)
- January 23:
  - Fate/stay night Unlimited Blade Works (Japan)
  - Magical Girl Lyrical Nanoha The Movie 1st (Japan)
  - Yu-Gi-Oh!: Bonds Beyond Time (Japan)
- January 25 - Daredevils of Sasun (Armenia)
- January 29 - Pleasant Goat and Big Big Wolf – Desert Trek: The Adventure of the Lost Totem (China)
- February 2 - Planet Hulk (United States)
- February 6 - The Disappearance of Haruhi Suzumiya (Japan)
- February 9:
  - Dante's Inferno: An Animated Epic (United States, Japan and South Korea)
  - LeapFrog: Math Adventure to the Moon (United States)
- February 16:
  - Halo Legends (United States and Japan)
  - Scooby-Doo! Abracadabra-Doo (United States)
- February 18 - Plumíferos (Argentina)
- February 23 - Justice League: Crisis on Two Earths (United States)
- February 27 - VeggieTales: Pistachio - The Little Boy That Woodn't (United States)
- March 6 - Doraemon: Nobita's Great Battle of the Mermaid King (Japan)
- March 9 - Barbie in A Mermaid Tale (United States)
- March 13 - Eden of the East – Paradise Lost (Japan)
- March 18 - Space Dogs (Russia)
- March 20 - Pretty Cure All Stars DX2: Light of Hope☆Protect the Rainbow Jewel! (Japan)
- March 26 - How To Train Your Dragon (United States)
- April 17:
  - Crayon Shin-chan: Super-Dimension! The Storm Called My Bride (Japan)
  - Detective Conan: The Lost Ship in the Sky (Japan)
- April 20 - The Drawn Together Movie: The Movie! (United States)
- April 24 - Trigun: Badlands Rumble (Japan)
- May - A Jewish Girl in Shanghai (China)
- May 1 - Book Girl (Japan)
- May 11 - Kung-Fu Magoo (United States and Mexico)
- May 21 - Shrek Forever After (United States)
- May 22 - Planzet (Japan)
- May 28:
  - Godkiller: Walk Among Us (United States)
  - Space Chimps 2: Zartog Strikes Back (United States)
- June 5 - Hetalia: Axis Powers – Paint it, White! (Japan)
- June 12 - Piercing I (China)
- June 16 - The Illusionist (France and United Kingdom)
- June 18 - Toy Story 3 (United States)
- June 23 - Lost Planet (Russia)
- June 26 - Welcome to the Space Show (Japan)
- July 9 - Despicable Me (United States)
- July 10 - Pokémon: Zoroark: Master of Illusions (Japan)
- July 17 - The Secret World of Arrietty (Japan)
- July 27 - Batman: Under the Red Hood (United States)
- July 31:
  - Hutch the Honeybee (Japan)
  - Naruto Shippuden The Movie: The Lost Tower (Japan)
  - VeggieTales: Sweetpea Beauty: A Girl After God's Own Heart (United States)
- August 6 - Moomins and the Comet Chase (Finland)
- August 11 - A Turtle's Tale: Sammy's Adventures (Belgium and France)
- August 15 - Care Bears: Share Bear Shines (United States)
- August 21 - Colorful (Japan)
- August 22 - Kayıp Armağan (Turkey)
- August 24 - Tom and Jerry Meet Sherlock Holmes (United States)
- August 28 - Loups=Garous (Japan)
- September 9 - Gaturro The Movie (Argentina, India and Mexico)
- September 14:
  - Barbie: A Fashion Fairy Tale (United States)
  - Scooby-Doo! Camp Scare (United States)
- September 16 - The Ugly Duckling (Russia)
- September 17 - Alpha and Omega (United States)
- September 18 - Mobile Suit Gundam 00 the Movie: A Wakening of the Trailblazer (Japan)
- September 21 - Tinker Bell and the Great Fairy Rescue (United States)
- September 24:
  - Héroes verdaderos (Mexico)
  - Legend of the Guardians: The Owls of Ga'Hoole (United States and Australia)
  - True Heroes: Independence (Mexico)
- September 28 - Superman/Batman: Apocalypse (United States)
- October 5:
  - Bratz: Pampered Petz (United States)
  - VeggieTales: It's a Meaningful Life (United States)
- October 7 - Animals United (Germany)
- October 8 - Lava Kusa: The Warrior Twins (India)
- October 13 - Arthur 3: The War of the Two Worlds (France)
- October 14:
  - The Legend of Secret Pass (United States)
  - Olsen Gang Gets Polished (Denmark)
  - Tigers and Tattoos (Denmark)
- October 15 - Ramayana: The Epic (India)
- October 20 - The Storytelling Show (France)
- October 21 - Open Season 3 (United States)
- October 23 - The Trashmaster (France)
- October 29:
  - La tropa de trapo en el país donde siempre brilla el sol (Spain)
  - Winx Club 3D: Magical Adventure (Italy)
- October 30 - HeartCatch PreCure! the Movie: Fashion Show in the Flower Capital... Really?! (Japan)
- November 5:
  - Megamind (United States)
  - El tesoro del rey Midas (Spain)
- November 6 - Mardock Scramble: The First Compression (Japan)
- November 13 - Green Days (South Korea)
- November 19 - Chico and Rita (Spain and United Kingdom)
- November 24:
  - Firebreather (United States)
  - Santa's Apprentice (France, Australia and Ireland)
  - Tangled (United States)
- November 26 - Las aventuras de Don Quijote (Spain)
- November 28 - Sky Song (Estonia)
- December 3 - Mars (United States)
- December 4 - Bleach: Hell Verse (Japan)
- December 10 - Elias and the Treasure of the Sea (Norway)
- December 13 - Ultramarines: A Warhammer 40,000 Movie (United Kingdom)
- December 15 - A Cat in Paris (France, Switzerland, Netherlands and Belgium)
- December 23 - Inazuma Eleven Saikyō Gundan Ōga Shūrai (Japan)
- December 25 - RPG Metanoia (Philippines)
- December 30 - How Not to Rescue a Princess (Russia)
- Specific date unknown:
  - Minnaminni 2 (India)
  - Shock Invasion (United States)

== Television series debuts ==
| Date | Title | Channel | Year |
|---|---|---|---|
| January 1 | Angelo Rules | France 3, France 4, Télétoon+, Cartoon Network | 2010–present |
| January 1 | Battle for Dream Island | YouTube | 2010–present |
| January 25 | Team Umizoomi | Nick Jr. | 2010–2015 |
| January 25 | Handy Manny's School for Tools | Playhouse Disney | 2010–2011 |
| February 13 | Kick Buttowski: Suburban Daredevil | Disney XD | 2010–2012 |
| February 13 | SciGirls | PBS Kids Go! | 2010–2015 |
| February 19 | The Ricky Gervais Show | HBO, Channel 4 | 2010–2012 |
| February 27 | Dance-A-Lot Robot | Playhouse Disney | 2010 |
| March 1 | Hero: 108 | Cartoon Network | 2010–2012 |
| March 7 | Pink Panther and Pals | Cartoon Network | 2010 |
| March 17 | Ugly Americans | Comedy Central | 2010–2012 |
| April 5 | Adventure Time | Cartoon Network | 2010–2018 |
| April 5 | Scooby-Doo! Mystery Incorporated | Cartoon Network | 2010–2013 |
| April 23 | Ben 10: Ultimate Alien | Cartoon Network | 2010–2012 |
| April 23 | Generator Rex | Cartoon Network | 2010–2013 |
| May 5 | Monster High | YouTube | 2010–2015 |
| June 5 | Pokémon: DP Sinnoh League Victors | Cartoon Network | 2010–2011 |
| June 7 | Neighbors from Hell | TBS | 2010 |
| June 24 | Futurama | Comedy Central | 2010–2013 |
| June 27 | Mary Shelley's Frankenhole | Adult Swim | 2010–2012 |
| September 3 | Sidekick | YTV | 2010–2013 |
| September 3 | Fish Hooks | Disney Channel | 2010–2014 |
| September 6 | The Cat in the Hat Knows a Lot About That! | PBS Kids | 2010–2018 |
| September 6 | Regular Show | Cartoon Network | 2010–2017 |
| September 6 | Mad | Cartoon Network | 2010–2013 |
| September 6 | NFL Rush Zone | Nicktoons | 2010–2014 |
| September 17 | Sym-Bionic Titan | Cartoon Network | 2010–2011 |
| September 22 | The Avengers: Earth's Mightiest Heroes | Disney XD | 2010–2013 |
| October 2 | Planet Sheen | Nickelodeon | 2010–2013 |
| October 2 | T.U.F.F. Puppy | Nickelodeon | 2010–2015 |
| October 10 | The Twisted Whiskers Show | The Hub | 2010 |
| October 10 | Cosmic Quantum Ray | The Hub | 2010 |
| October 10 | My Little Pony: Friendship Is Magic | The Hub | 2010–2019 |
| October 10 | Pound Puppies | The Hub | 2010–2013 |
| October 10 | Strawberry Shortcake's Berry Bitty Adventures | The Hub | 2010–2015 |
| October 11 | Zevo-3 | Nicktoons | 2010–2011 |
| October 11 | Maryoku Yummy | The Hub | 2010 |
| October 15 | The Adventures of Chuck and Friends | The Hub | 2010–2012 |
| October 25 | Robotomy | Cartoon Network | 2010–2011 |
| November 18 | Dick Figures | Mondo, YouTube | 2010–2015 |
| November 22 | Babar and the Adventures of Badou | YTV, Treehouse TV | 2010–2015 |
| November 26 | G.I. Joe Renegades | The Hub | 2010–2011 |
| November 26 | Young Justice | Cartoon Network, DC Universe | 2010–2022 |
| November 29 | Transformers: Prime | The Hub | 2010–2013 |
| December 3 | Take Two with Phineas and Ferb | Disney Channel | 2010–2011 |
| December 21 | Zig & Sharko | Canal+ | 2010–present |

== Television series endings ==
| Date | Title | Channel | Year | Notes |
|---|---|---|---|---|
| January 28 | SuperNews! | Current TV | 2005–2010 | Ended |
| January 30 | The Secret Saturdays | Cartoon Network | 2008–2010 | Ended |
| February 11 | 6teen | Teletoon | 2004–2010 | Ended |
| February 21 | Wow! Wow! Wubbzy! | Nick Jr. | 2006–2010 | Ended |
| February 25 | Fantastic Four: World's Greatest Heroes | Cartoon Network | 2006–2010 | Ended |
| March 13 | Chaotic | TheCW4Kids, Teletoon | 2006–2010 | Ended |
| March 26 | Ben 10: Alien Force | Cartoon Network | 2008–2010 | Ended |
| May 6 | King of the Hill | Fox | 1997–2010, 2025–present | Ended |
| May 15 | Pokémon: DP Galactic Battles | Cartoon Network | 2009–2010 | Ended |
| July 26 | Neighbors from Hell | TBS | 2010 | Cancelled |
| August 7 | Chowder | Cartoon Network | 2007–2010 | Ended |
| August 23 | Pink Panther and Pals | Cartoon Network | 2010 | Cancelled |
| August 30 | The Marvelous Misadventures of Flapjack | Cartoon Network | 2008–2010 | Ended |
| September 24 | Tasty Time with ZeFronk | Playhouse Disney | 2008–2010 | Ended |
| October 9 | My Friends Tigger & Pooh | Playhouse Disney | 2007–2010 | Ended |
| November 4 | Fetch! With Ruff Ruffman | PBS Kids Go! | 2006–2010 | Ended |
| November 13 | Angelina Ballerina: The Next Steps | PBS Kids | 2009–2010 | Ended |
| November 15 | Maryoku Yummy | The Hub | 2010 | Cancelled |
| November 22 | Between the Lions | PBS Kids | 2000–2010 | Ended |
| December 1 | The Twisted Whiskers Show | The Hub | 2010 | Cancelled |
| December 9 | Cosmic Quantum Ray | The Hub | 2010 | Cancelled |

== Television season premieres ==
| Date | Title | Season | Channel |
|---|---|---|---|
| February 27 | Mickey Mouse Clubhouse | 3 | Playhouse Disney (Disney Channel) |
| March 13 | The Penguins of Madagascar | 2 | Nickelodeon |
| March 17 | South Park | 14 | Comedy Central |
| June 10 | Total Drama | 3 | Teletoon (Note: Season later premiered in the US on Cartoon Network on June 21st.) |
| June 24 | Futurama | 6 | Comedy Central |
| July 5 | The Marvelous Misadventures of Flapjack | 3 | Cartoon Network |
| September 26 | The Cleveland Show | 2 | Fox |
| September 26 | Family Guy | 9 | Fox |
| September 26 | The Simpsons | 22 | Fox |
| October 3 | American Dad! | 7 | Fox |
| October 11 | Adventure Time | 2 | Cartoon Network |
| November 29 | Regular Show | 2 | Cartoon Network |

== Television season finales ==
| Date | Title | Season | Channel |
|---|---|---|---|
| February 15 | The Penguins of Madagascar | 1 | Nickelodeon |
| February 20 | Mickey Mouse Clubhouse | 2 | Playhouse Disney (Disney Channel) |
| April 6 | Total Drama | 2 | Cartoon Network (Note: Season later concluded in Canada on Teletoon on June 10th.) |
| May 16 | American Dad! | 6 | Fox |
| May 23 | The Cleveland Show | 1 | Fox |
| May 23 | The Simpsons | 21 | Fox |
| June 20 | Family Guy | 8 | BBC Three (Note: The episode "Partial Terms of Endearment" was banned from airing on Fox in the United States due to its controversial portrayal about abortion.) |
| June 21 | The Marvelous Misadventures of Flapjack | 2 | Cartoon Network |
| July 5 | SpongeBob SquarePants | 6 | Nickelodeon |
| September 27 | Adventure Time | 1 | Cartoon Network |
| November 4 | Fanboy & Chum Chum | 1 | Nickelodeon |
| November 15 | Total Drama | 3 | Cartoon Network (Note: Season later premiered in Canada on Teletoon on April 24, 2011.) |
| November 17 | South Park | 14 | Comedy Central |
| November 22 | Regular Show | 1 | Cartoon Network |
| December 10 | Ben 10: Ultimate Alien | 1 | Cartoon Network |
| December 10 | Generator Rex | 1 | Cartoon Network |

== Video games based on animated films, series, etc. ==
| Initial Release Date | Title | Platforms | Publisher | Developer |
|---|---|---|---|---|
| January 9 | Kingdom Hearts Birth by Sleep | PlayStation Portable | Square Enix | Square Enix Product Development Division 5 |
| March 2 | SpongeBob's Boating Bash | Wii, Nintendo DS | THQ | Imulsive Games (Wii) Firebrand Games (DS) |
| March 23 | How to Train Your Dragon | Xbox 360, PlayStation 3, Wii, Nintendo DS | Activision | Étranges Libellules (Console) Griptonite Games (DS) |
| May 12 | Shrek Forever After | Mobile, Xbox 360, PlayStation 3, Wii, Nintendo DS, Microsoft Windows, iOS | Activision | Gameloft (Mobile & iOS) XPEC Entertainment (Console & Windows) Griptonite Games (DS) |
| May 26 | Ben 10: Alien Force – The Rise of Hex | Xbox 360, Wii | Konami Digital Entertainment | Black Lantern Studios |
| June 15 | Toy Story 3 | Xbox 360, PlayStation 3, Wii, Nintendo DS, PlayStation Portable, Microsoft Windows, Mac OS X, iOS, PlayStation 2 | Disney Interactive Studios Disney Mobile Studios (iOS) | Avalanche Studios (Console & Windows) Asobo Studios (PSP & PS2) N-Space (DS) TransGaming (OS X) |
| July 6 | Despicable Me: The Game | PlayStation 2, Wii, PlayStation Portable | NA: D3 Publisher EU: Namco Bandai Games | Monkey Bar Games |
| July 6 | Despicable Me: The Game - Minion Mayhem | Nintendo DS | NA: D3 Publisher EU: Namco Bandai Games | Wayforward Technologies |
| July 29 | Dora's Big Birthday Adventure | iOS, Wii, PlayStation 2, Nintendo DS Microsoft Windows | MTV Networks (iOS) Take-Two Interactive (Console & DS) Avanquest Software (Windows) | MTV Networks (iOS) High Voltage Software (Wii) 2K Play (PS2 & Windows) Black Lantern Studios (DS) |
| August 10 | Galatic Taz Ball | Nintendo DS | Warner Bros. Interactive Entertainment | Wayforward Technologies |
| September 7 | Batman: The Brave and the Bold – The Videogame | Wii, Nintendo DS | Warner Bros. Interactive Entertainment | Wayforward Technologies |
| September 14 | Alpha and Omega | Nintendo DS | Storm City Games | Sparkworkz |
| September 14 | Legend of the Guardians: The Owls of Ga'Hoole | Xbox 360, PlayStation 3, Wii, Nintendo DS | Warner Bros. Interactive Entertainment | Krome Studios Tantalus Media (DS) |
| September 14 | Phineas and Ferb: Ride Again | Nintendo DS | Disney Interactive Studios | Altron |
| September 14 | Scooby-Doo! and the Spooky Swamp | PlayStation 2, Wii, Nintendo DS, Microsoft Windows | Warner Bros. Interactive Entertainment | Torus Games |
| October 5 | Ben 10: Ultimate Alien – Cosmic Destruction | PlayStation 2, Xbox 360, PlayStation 3, Wii, Nintendo DS, PlayStation Portable | NA: D3 Publisher EU: Namco Bandai Games | Papaya Studio Griptonite Games (DS) |
| October 19 | Cars Toon: Mater Tall Tales | Wii | Disney Interactive Studios | Papaya Studio |
| October 26 | Disney Channel All Star Party (Note: Phineas and Ferb is the only animated series featured in this game.) | Wii | Disney Interactive Studios | Page 44 Studios |
| October 26 | Dora's Cooking Club | Nintendo DS | Take-Two Interactive | 2K Play |
| November 2 | Megamind: Mega Team Unite | Wii | THQ | THQ Studio Australia |
| November 2 | Megamind: The Blue Defender | Nintendo DS, PlayStation Portable | THQ | Tantalus |
| November 2 | Megamind: Ultimate Showdown | Xbox 360, PlayStation 3 | THQ | THQ Studio Australia |
| November 2 | The Penguins of Madagascar | Nintendo DS | THQ | Griptonite Games |
| November 8 | Nickelodeon Fit | Wii | 2K Games | High Voltage Software |
| November 23 | Tangled | Wii, Nintendo DS, Microsoft Windows | Disney Interactive Studios | Planet Moon Studios GameStar (Windows) |
| November 25 | Epic Mickey | Wii | Disney Interactive Studios | Junction Point Studios |

== Births ==
=== December ===
- December 15: Zion Broadnax, American actress (voice of Morgan Malto in Transformers: EarthSpark).

== Deaths ==
=== January ===
- January 1: John Freeman, American animator (Walt Disney Company, Peanuts specials, Hanna-Barbera, Ruby-Spears, DePatie-Freleng), dies at age 93.
- January 8: Art Clokey, American animator, director (Gumby, Davey and Goliath) and actor (voice of Pokey in Gumby), dies at age 88.
- January 10: Barry Blitzer, American television writer (Hanna-Barbera), dies at age 80.
- January 22: Jean Simmons, English actress (voice of Old Sophie in Howl's Moving Castle, Council Member #2 in Final Fantasy: The Spirits Within), dies at age 80.
- January 27: Zelda Rubinstein, American actress and human rights activist (voice of Atrocia Frankenstone in The Flintstone Comedy Show, Psychiatrist in The Flintstones: On the Rocks, Darkwing Duck's Mother and Negaduck's Mother in the Darkwing Duck episode "The Secret Origins of Darkwing Duck", Madame Zeldarina in the Goof Troop episode "Rally Round the Goof", Patty's mother in the Hey Arnold! episode "Polishing Rhonda"), dies from a heart attack at age 76.

=== February ===
- February 4: Te Wei, Chinese comics artist and animator (The Proud General), dies at age 94.
- February 11: Marvin Stein, American comics artist, animator and illustrator, dies at age 85.
- February 18: Fernando Krahn, Chilean artist, comics artist, illustrator and animator (El Crimen Perfecto), dies at age 75.
- February 19: Rudy Larriva, American animator and director (Warner Bros. Cartoons, UPA, the opening credits of The Twilight Zone), dies at age 94.
- February 24: Dawn Brancheau, American senior animal trainer (guest starred in the Fetch! with Ruff Ruffman episode "Ruff Pigs Out and Has a Whale of a Time"), drowns from an orca attack at age 40.

=== March ===
- March 3: Anatoly Petrov, Russian film director and animator (Happy Merry-Go-Round, Polygon), dies at age 72.
- March 14:
  - Cherie DeCastro, American singer (Bird and Animal voices in Song of the South), dies at age 87.
  - Peter Graves, American actor (voice of General Warning and the Narrator in The Angry Beavers episode "The Day the World Got Really Screwed Up", Instructor Voice in the Mickey Mouse Works episode "How To Be A Spy", Sheldon Miller in the Minoriteam episode "Tax Day", Mr. Pibb in the American Dad! episode "A.T. the Abusive Terrestrial"), dies from a heart attack at age 83.
- March 16: David J. Steinberg, American actor (portrayed the SpongeBob Hallucination in the live-action segment of the SpongeBob SquarePants episode "Atlantis SquarePantis"), commits suicide at age 45.
- March 29: János Kass, Hungarian animator, illustrator, graphic designer and film director (Dilemma), dies at age 82.
- March 30: Jane Webb, American film, radio, and voice actress (Filmation), dies at age 84.

=== April ===
- April 6:
  - Tom Ray, American animator and film director (Warner Bros. Cartoons, John Sutherland Productions, MGM, DePatie-Freleng, Ralph Bakshi, Chuck Jones, Filmation, Hanna-Barbera, Film Roman) at age 90.
  - Eddie Carroll, Canadian actor (voice of Jiminy Cricket since 1973), dies at age 76.
- April 7: Betty Paraskevas, American writer and lyricist (co-creator of The Kids from Room 402, Maggie and the Ferocious Beast and Marvin the Tap-Dancing Horse), dies from pancreatic cancer at age 80.
- April 15: Michael Pataki, American actor (voice of The Cow in Mighty Mouse: The New Adventures, George Liquor in Ren & Stimpy, the Chief in Boo Boo Runs Wild, Sewer King in the Batman: The Animated Series episode "The Underdwellers"), dies from cancer at age 72.
- April 17: Carl Macek, American actor, writer, and producer (Robotech), dies at age 58.
- April 18: Allen Swift, American actor (voice of Simon Bar Sinister and Riff-Raff in Underdog, third voice of Mighty Mouse), dies at age 86.
- April 23: Eiji Kusuhara, Japanese-born British actor (voice of Dr. Kamikazi in Robotboy), dies from cancer at age 63.

=== May ===
- May 21: Howard Post, American animator, cartoonist, and comic strip and comic book writer-artist (Famous Studios), dies at age 83.
- May 26:
  - Pat Stevens, American actress (second voice of Velma Dinkley in the Scooby-Doo franchise, additional voices in Dynomutt, Dog Wonder and Captain Caveman and the Teen Angels), dies from breast cancer at age 64.
  - Art Linkletter, Canadian-American radio and television personality (portrayed himself in the prologue of The Snow Queen), dies at age 97.
- May 27:
  - Peter Keefe, American television producer (Voltron, Denver the Last Dinosaur, Widget) and co-founder of Zodiac Entertainment, dies at age 57 from throat cancer.
  - Payut Ngaokrachang, Thai animator and film director (The Adventure of Sudsakorn), dies at age 81.
- May 28:
  - Eddie Barth, American actor (voice of Champ in Rover Dangerfield, Detective Kurt Bowman in Superman: The Animated Series, Frank the Pug in Men in Black: The Series, Louie and Referee in As Told by Ginger, Gorgonzola in the Biker Mice from Mars episode "A Scent, a Memory, a Far Distant Cheese"), dies from heart failure at age 78.
  - Gary Coleman, American actor and comedian (voice of Andy Le Beau in The Gary Coleman Show, Kevin and 42nd Street in Waynehead, various characters in Robot Chicken, voiced himself in The Simpsons episodes "Grift of the Magi", "A Tale of Two Springfields" and "Day of the Jackanapes", and Night of the Living Doo), dies from a brain hemorrhage at age 42.
- May 30: Robert O. Smith, American voice actor (voice of Genma Saotome and Sasuke Sarugakure in Ranma ½, Kaijinbō in Inuyasha), dies at age 67.

=== June ===
- June 3: Rue McClanahan, American actress and comedian (voice of Scarlett in Annabelle's Wish, Anastasia Hardy in the Spider-Man episode "Doctor Octopus: Armed and Dangerous", Bunny in the King of the Hill episode "Hair Today, Gone Today"), dies from a brain hemorrhage at age 76.

=== July ===
- July 1: Ilene Woods, American actress and singer (voice of the title character in Cinderella), dies at age 81.
- July 15: Peter Fernandez, American actor, voice director and writer (voice of the title character in Alakazam the Great, Buttons Brilliant and Johnny in Gigantor, the title character and Racer X in Speed Racer, Dr. Mariner and Piper in Marine Boy, various characters in Superbook, Max and Grimm the Dragon in Princess Gwenevere and the Jewel Riders, Benton Tarantella, Robot Randy, Conway the Contaminationist, The Shadow and Rich Guy in Courage the Cowardly Dog, Headmaster Spritle and Speed Racer Sr. in Speed Racer: The Next Generation, additional voices in Astro Boy, Ace Ventura: Pet Detective and Kenny the Shark), dies from lung cancer at age 83.
- July 17:
  - Pres Romanillos, American animator and film producer (Walt Disney Company, DreamWorks), dies at age 47.
  - Shirley Silvey, American animator (worked for UPA, Jay Ward), dies at age 82.
- July 24: John Callahan, American cartoonist (creator of Pelswick and John Callahan's Quads!), dies at age 59.

=== August ===
- August 7: Alex Johns, American production coordinator (The Ren & Stimpy Show) and producer (Futurama, Olive, the Other Reindeer, The Ant Bully), dies at age 43.
- August 9: George DiCenzo, American actor (voice of Hordak in She-Ra: Princess of Power, the title character in Blackstar, Otar in Galtar and the Golden Lance, Lou Albano in Hulk Hogan's Rock 'n' Wrestling, Ubu in the Batman: The Animated Series episode "Avatar", Commander in the Animaniacs episode "Puttin' on the Blitz"), dies at age 70.
- August 10: Ben Hurst, American television writer (DIC Entertainment, Tiny Toon Adventures), dies at age 59.
- August 19: Christopher Shea, American former child actor (voice of Linus Van Pelt in A Charlie Brown Christmas, Charlie Brown's All Stars!, It's the Great Pumpkin, Charlie Brown, You're in Love, Charlie Brown and He's Your Dog, Charlie Brown), dies at age 52.
- August 23:
  - George David Weiss, American songwriter (Fun and Fancy Free, Melody Time), dies at age 89.
  - Kihachirō Kawamoto, Japanese puppet designer, animator and film director (The Book of the Dead), dies at age 85.
- August 24:
  - Mitsuyo Seo, Japanese animator and film director (Momotarō no Umiwashi, Momotarō: Umi no Shinpei), dies at age 98.
  - Satoshi Kon, Japanese manga artist and animator (Perfect Blue, Millennium Actress, Tokyo Godfathers, Paranoia Agent, Paprika), dies at age 46 from pancreatic cancer.
- August 31: Mick Lally, Irish stage, film and television actor (voice of Brother Aidan in The Secret of Kells), dies at age 64.

=== September ===
- September 1: Cammie King, American actress (voice of young Faline in Bambi), dies at age 76.
- September 3: Robert Schimmel, American comedian (voice of Prisoner in The Simpsons episode "Pokey Mom", himself in the Dr. Katz, Professional Therapist episode "Wild Weekend"), dies in a car accident at age 60.
- September 7: Glenn Shadix, American actor (voice of the Mayor of Halloween Town in The Nightmare Before Christmas, Brain and Monsieur Mallah in Teen Titans, Cluemaster in The Batman episode "Q&A"), dies at age 58.
- September 10: Billie Mae Richards, Canadian actress (voice of the title character in Rudolph the Red-Nosed Reindeer, and Tenderheart Bear in The Care Bears), dies at age 88.
- September 11: Harold Gould, American actor (voice of Old Denahi in Brother Bear, Shiro Nishi in Whisper of the Heart, Benjamin in The Greatest Adventure: Stories from the Bible episode "The Miracle of Jesus"), dies at age 86.
- September 17: Bill Littlejohn, American animator (worked for and at Van Beuren Studio, Tom & Jerry, Walter Lantz, Jay Ward Productions, Animation Inc., Fine Arts Films, The Ink Tank, the Peanuts Christmas specials), dies at age 96.
- September 22: Jackie Burroughs, English-born Canadian actress (voice of the Spirit in The Care Bears Movie, Katherine in Heavy Metal, Morag in Star Wars: Ewoks, Frau Rottenmeier in Heidi), dies at age 71.
- September 29: Tony Curtis, American actor (voice of Stony Curtis in The Flintstones episode "The Return of Stoney Curtis", TV Interviewer in Sparky's Magic Piano, Bernard in Roxanne's Best Christmas Ever), dies at age 85.

=== October ===
- October 2: Daria Paris, American production assistant (The Simpsons), dies from cancer at age 60.
- October 16:
  - Barbara Billingsley, American actress (voice of Nanny in Muppet Babies), dies at age 94.
  - Chao-Li Chi, Chinese actor (voice of Yoru in the Batman: The Animated Series episode "Night of the Ninja"), dies at age 83.
- October 19: Tom Bosley, American actor (voice of Harry Boyle in Wait Till Your Father Gets Home, B.A.H. Humbug, Esq. in The Stingiest Man in Town, the title character in The World of David the Gnome, Geppetto in Pinocchio and the Emperor of the Night, Mr. Winkle in The Tangerine Bear, Howard Cunningham in the Family Guy episode "The Father, the Son, and the Holy Fonz", Santa Claus in the Johnny Bravo episode "Twas the Night"), dies at age 83.
- October 20: Bob Guccione, American photographer and publisher (voiced himself in the Duckman episodes "Pig Amok" and "Love! Anger! Kvetching!"), dies at age 79.
- October 22: Alex Anderson, American cartoonist (co-creator of Rocky and Bullwinkle, Dudley Do-Right, Crusader Rabbit), dies at age 90.
- October 29: Takeshi Shudo, Japanese scriptwriter and novelist (Pokémon), dies at age 61.

=== November ===
- November 4: Michelle Nicastro, American actress, singer and musician (voice of Odette in The Swan Princess), dies at age 50 from breast and brain cancer.
- November 7: Yoshinobu Nishizaki, Japanese animator (Mushi Production), and film producer (Space Battleship Yamato), drowns at age 75 after falling off the research steamboat Yamato.
- November 25: Michel Douay, French comics artist, illustrator and animator (worked for Paul Grimault's studio) dies at age 95.
- November 28: Leslie Nielsen, Canadian-American producer (The Secret World of Benjamin Bear), actor and comedian (voice of the Narrator in The Railway Dragon and Katie and Orbie, Boomer in Pumper Pups, the title character in Zeroman), dies from pneumonia at age 84.

=== December ===
- December 1: Heidi Guedel Garofalo, American animator (Walt Disney Animation Studios, Sullivan Bluth Studios, The Chipmunk Adventure, Space Jam, Quest for Camelot, The King and I, Futurama), dies at age 62.
- December 6: Mark Dailey, American-born Canadian actor, television journalist and announcer (voice of Crag in The Ripping Friends, Rokusho, Roks and Eddie in Medabots, Brad Best in Beyblade, Omega Steed in the Spliced episode "Stupid Means Never Having To Say I'm Sorry"), dies at age 57.
- December 15: John Sparey, American animator (Walt Disney Animation Studios, Crusader Rabbit, Calvin and the Colonel, The Funny Company, Underdog, Tennessee Tuxedo and His Tales, Hanna-Barbera, Bakshi Animation, Tom and Jerry: The Movie, The Swan Princess, animated the main titles for Bobby's World), scene planner (Starchaser: The Legend of Orin, The Chipmunk Adventure) and director (Mighty Mouse: The New Adventures, Film Roman), dies at age 83.
- December 25: Aron Abrams, American television producer and writer (King of the Hill, Glenn Martin, DDS, Bob's Burgers), dies at age 50.
- December 30: Michael Allinson, English-American actor (additional voices in Courage the Cowardly Dog), dies at age 90.

== See also ==
- 2010 in anime
