= 9th Visual Effects Society Awards =

Award for the best visual effects in film and television

9th Visual Effects Society Awards

February 1, 2011

Best Visual Effects in a Visual Effects Driven Motion Picture:
Inception

The 9th Visual Effects Society Awards, held on February 1, 2011 at the Beverly Hilton Hotel in Beverly Hills, California, honored the best visual effects in film and television of 2010. The show was hosted by Patton Oswalt and broadcast, in an edited version, on the ReelzChannel on February 19, 2011.

== Winners and nominees ==
(winners in bold)

=== Honorary Awards ===
Lifetime Achievement Award:

- **Ray Harryhausen**

VES Visionary Award:

- **Christopher Nolan**

=== Film ===
Outstanding Visual Effects in a Visual Effects-Driven Feature Motion Picture	Outstanding Supporting Visual Effects in a Feature Motion Picture
**Inception** – Paul Franklin, Chris Corbould, Mike Chambers, Matthew Plummer: Alice in Wonderland – Ken Ralston, Tom Peitzman, David Schaub, Carey Villegas; Harry Potter and the Deathly Hallows – Part 1 – Tim Burke, Emma Norton, John Richardson; Iron Man 2 – Ben Snow, Ged Wright, Janek Sirrs, Susan Pickett; Tron: Legacy – Eric Barba, Lisa Beroud, Steve Gaub, Steve Preeg	**Hereafter** – Michael Owens, Joel Mendias, Bryan Grill, Danielle Plantec: Black Swan – Dan Schrecker, Colleen Bachman, Michael Capton, Brad Kalinoski; Green Zone – Peter Chiang, Charlie Noble, Michael Capton, Matthew Plummer; Robin Hood – Richard Stammers, Allen Maris, Jessica Norman, Max Wood; Salt – Robert Grasmere, Camille Cellucci, Mark Breakspear, Ivan Moran
Outstanding Animation in an Animated Feature Motion Picture	Outstanding Animated Character in a Live Action Feature Motion Picture
**How to Train Your Dragon** – Simon Otto, Craig Ring, Bonnie Arnold: Legend of the Guardians: The Owls of Ga'Hoole – Zareh Naibandian, Simon Whiteley, Eric Leighton, Alex Wright; Shrek Forever After – Jason Reisig, Doug Cooper, Gina Shay, Teresa Cheng; Tangled – Clay Kaytis, John Kahrs, Glen Keane, Roy Conli; Toy Story 3 – Lee Unkrich, Darla K. Anderson, Guido Quaroni, Michael Fong	**Harry Potter and the Deathly Hallows – Part 1** - **Dobby** – Matthieu Vig, Ben Lambert, Laurie Brugger, Marine Poirson; Cats & Dogs: The Revenge of Kitty Galore - Kitty Galore – William Groebe, Brian Medenhall, Aharon Bourland, Steve Reding; The Chronicles of Narnia: The Voyage of the Dawn Treader - Reepicheep – Gabriele Zucchelli, Catherine Mullan, Benoit Dubuc, Pete Bayley; Harry Potter and the Deathly Hallows – Part 1 - Kreacher – Laurent Laban, Will Brand, Matthieu Goutte, Jason Baker
Outstanding Animated Character in an Animated Feature Motion Picture	Outstanding Models in a Feature Motion Picture
**How to Train Your Dragon** – **Toothless** – Gabe Hordos, Cassidy Curtis, Mariette Marinus, Brent Watkins: Legend of the Guardians: The Owls of Ga'Hoole - Digger – Josh Murtack, James Cunliffe, Jessica Groom, Andrew Hunt; Megamind - Minion – David Cross, Rani Naamani, Dick Walsh, Adrian Tsang; Tangled - Rapunzel – Tony Smeed, Amy Smeed, Becky Bresee, Kira Lehtomaki	**Inception** - **Hospital Fortress Destruction** – Ian Hunter, Scott Beverly, Forest Fischer: The Expendables - The Palace Explodes – Bruce Holcomb, Ron Woodall, John Goodson, John Walker; Iron Man 2 - Hammer Military Drones – Bruce Holcomb, Ron Woodall, John Goodson, John Walker; Shutter Island - Ward-C, Lighthouse – Matthew Gratzner, Scott Schneider, Adam Gelbart, Richard A. F. Ewan
Outstanding Created Environment in a Feature Motion Picture	Outstanding Effects Animation in an Animated Feature Motion Picture
**Inception** - **Paris Dreamscape** – Bruno Baron, Dan Neal, Graham Page, Per Mork-Jensen: Iron Man 2 - Stark Expo – Giles Hancock, Richard Bluff, Todd Vaziri, Aaron McBride; Prince of Persia: The Sands of Time - Sand Room – Alex Rothwell, Chris Zeh, Laurent Hugueniot, Kevin Jenkins; Tron: Legacy - Disc Game – Jonathan Litt, Juan S. Gomez, Kevin Sears, Sonja Burchard	**How to Train Your Dragon** – Andy Hayes, Laurent Kermel, Jason Mayer, Brett Miller: Legend of the Guardians: The Owls of Ga'Hoole – Sebastien Quessy, Kevin Blom, Jerome Escobar; Shrek Forever After – Jeff Budsberg, Andrew Kim, Yancy Lindquist, Can Yuksel; Toy Story 3 – Jason Johnston, Eric Froemling, David Ryu, JD Northrup
Outstanding Compositing in a Feature Motion Picture	Outstanding Achievement in an Animated Short
**Inception** – Astrid Busser-Casas, Scott Pritchard, Jan Maroske, George Zwier: Alice in Wonderland- Stolen Tarts – Aaron Kupferman, Lisa Deaner, Orde Stevanoski, Ruben Flores; Hereafter - Tsunami Sequence – Joseph Farrell, Nick Crew, Jamie Hallett, Christine Lo; Tron: Legacy – Paul Lambert, Sonja Burchard, Kym Olsen, Sarajane Javelo Chase	**Day & Night** – Teddy Newton, Kevin Reher, Michael Fu, Tom Gately: Cat Shit One: The Animated Series – Kazuya Sasahara, Junya Okabe, Tomohisa Ishikawa, Yoshiyuki Okada; Looney Tunes - Coyote Falls – Bryan Engram, Greg Lyons, Josh Carey, Harry Michalakeas; Paths of Hate – Tomasz Bagiński, Jaroslaw Sawko, Damian Nenow, Marta Staniszewska; Tick Tock Tale – Dorothy McKim, John Murrah, Adolph Lusinsky, Wayne Unten

=== Television ===
Outstanding Visual Effects in a Broadcast Series	Outstanding Supporting Visual Effects in a Broadcast Program
**Caprica** – Michael Gibson, Gary Hutzel, Davey Morton, Jesse Mesa Toves: The Event – Victor Scalise, Jason Spratt, Diego Galtieri, Mike Enriquez; No Ordinary Family – Andrew Orloff, Curt Miller, Paul Linden, Scott Tinter; Stargate Universe – Mark Savela, James Rorick, Craig Vanden Biggelaar, Adam de Bosch Kemper; V – Andrew Orloff, Nathan Overstrom, Karen Czukerberg, Roberto Biagi	**Boardwalk Empire** – Robert Stromberg, Dave Taritero, Richard Friedlander, Paul Graff: Human Target – Andrew Orloff, Raoul Yorke Bologini, Nathan Overstrom, Charlene Eberle; Lost – Adam Avitabile, Melinka Thompson-Godoy, Michael Capton, Michael Degtjarewsky; Undercovers – Jay Worth, Andrew Waisler, Ron Thornton, Andrew Kramer; The Walking Dead – Sam Nicholson, Jason Sperling, Kent Johnson, Chris Martin
Outstanding Visual Effects in a Broadcast Miniseries, Movie or Special	Outstanding Visual Effects in a Live Action Commercial
**The Pacific** – John Sullivan, David Taritero, William Mesa, Marco Requay: America: The Story of Us – Philip Dobree, Sophie Orde, Eloi Brunelle, Hasraf Dulull; Inside the Perfect Predator – Philip Dobree, Richard Costin, Sam Meisels; The Last Day of the Dinosaurs – Arnaud Brisebois, Louis Desrocher, Alain Lachance, Marc-Antoine Rousseau; Prep & Landing: Operation: Secret Santa – Dorothy McKim, Kyle Odermatt, Andy Harkness, Adolph Lusinsky	**Halo: Reach** – Dan Glass, Dan Seddon, Matt Dessero, Stephanie Gilgar: Barclaycard - Rollercoaster – Angus Kneale, Ben Smith, Dan Williams, Ruben Vanderbroek; DirecTV - Ice Cream – Franck Lambertz, Andrew Bell, Mike Wynd, Ross Denner; Verizon - Towers – Robert Sethi, Arielle Davis, Chris Knight, Andre Desouza; Wrigley's 5 Gum - React – Robert Sethi, Chris Knight, Arielle Davis, Gawain Liddiard
Outstanding Animated Commercial	Outstanding Animated Character in a Broadcast Program or Commercial
**Cadbury's Spots V Stripes** – Jake Mengers, Julie Evans, Jorge Montiel Meurer, Michael Gregory: Andrex – Abby Orchard, Antoine Moulineau, Mike Mellor, Russell Dodgson; Dante's Inferno - Hell Awaits – Tim Miller, Kevin Margo, Lindsey Zaplas, Kirby Miller; Target - A Better Bullseye – Chris Riehl, Javier Jimenez, Daniel Zobrist, Charles Paek; World of Warcraft – Marc Messenger, Phillip Hillenbrand Jr., Michael Kelleher, Brian LaFrance	**Citron C3 The Spacebox - Citro** – Michael Nauzin, Anne Chatelian, Gregory Mougne, Cedric Nicolas: Cadbury - Freida Steer – Raphael Pimentel, Thana Siripopungul; Logitech - Robot – Tony Smeed, Chad Sellers, Patrick Osborne, John Wong; Prep and Landing: Operation Secret Santa - Lanny – Tony Smeed, Chad Sellers, Patrick Osborne, John Wong
Outstanding Created Environment in a Broadcast Program or Commercial	Outstanding Models in a Broadcast Program or Commercial
**The Pacific - The Battle of Iwo Jima** – Marco Recuay, Morgan McDermott, Nick Lund-Ulrich: Boardwalk Empire - Boardwalk – Robert Stromberg, Paul Graff, Brian Sales, Brian Pace; Boardwalk Empire - Family Limitation – J. John Corbett, Matthew Conner, Brendan Fitzgerald, Jun Zhang; The Event - To Keep Us Safe – Michael Cook, Jon Rosenthal, Ragui Hanna, Ryan Wieber	**Boardwalk Empire - The Ivory Tower** – J. John Corbett, Matthew Conner, Brendan Fitzgerald: Family Guy - Brian Griffin's House of Payne – Andrew Karr, Alex McClymont, Daniel Osaki, Paul Hegg
Outstanding Compositing in a Broadcast Program or Commercial	
**The Pacific - Peleliu Landing** – Jeremy Nelson, John P. Mesa, Dan Novy, Tyler Cote: Boardwalk Empire - Boardwalk Empire – Paul Graff, Brian Sales, Jesse Siglow, Merysa Nichols; Drench Cubehead – Matthew Unwin, Lisa Ryan, Michael Gregory; Travelers - Watering Hole – Franck Lamberts, Ryan Kowles	

=== Other categories ===
Outstanding Real-Time Visual Effects in a Video Game	Outstanding Visual Effects in a Video Game Trailer
**Halo: Reach** – Marcus Lehto, Joseph Tung, Stephen Scott, CJ Cowan: Kinectimals – Jorg Neumann, Brian Moore, John Laws, Jonny Watts; Need for Speed – Henry LaBounta, Fiona Sperry, Johannes Soderqvist, Alex Fry; Starcraft II – Scott Goffman, Phillip Hillenbrand Jr., Nick Carpenter, James McCoy	**World of Warcraft** – Marc Messenger, Phillip Hillenbrand Jr.: Deus Ex: Human Revolution – Barbara Brennan, Jay Cooper, Kimberly Lashbrook, Dorne Huebler; Star Wars: The Force Unleashed – Dave Wilson, Corey Butler, Keith Luczywo, Seung Jae Lee; Star Wars: The Old Republic 2 – Tim Miller, Dave Wilson, Lindsey Zamplas, Brandon Riza
Outstanding Animated Character in a Video Game	Outstanding Visual Effects in a Special Venue Project
**Starcraft II - Sarah Kerrigan** – Fausto De Matini, Xin Wang, Glenn Ramos, Scott Lange: Halo: Reach - Kat – Lee R. Wilson, Jason Robertson, David Hunt, Joe Spataro; Kinectimals - Cub – Joel Mongeon, Kenneth Lammers, Felix Ilsley, Andrew Matthews	**King Kong: 360 3-D** – Matt Aitken, Kevin Sherwood, Eric Reynolds, R. Christopher White: City Of Ruins – Marcin Kobylecki, Piotr Sliwowski, Michal Gryn, Damian Nenow; Flight of the Dragon – Brent Young, Dina Benadon, Charlotte Huggins, Michael "Oz" Smith; Harry Potter and the Forbidden Journey – Adam Howard, Richard Mann, Matt Hendershot, James Strauss
Outstanding Visual Effects in a Student Project	
**LOOM** – Regina Welker, Jan Bitzer, Ilija Brunck, Csaba Letay: Das Tub – Rupert Ashton, Priyan Jayamaha, Jun Ying Xu, Kirsten Dale Pretorious; Nuisible(s) – Erick Hupin, Baptiste Ode, Philippe Puech, Pierre Nahoum; Time For Change – Rupert Ashton, Priyan Jayamaha, Jun Ying Xu, Kirsten Dale Pretorious	
