= Sasahara =

Sasahara (written: 笹原 lit. "bamboo field") is a Japanese surname. Notable people with the surname include:

- Fumio Sasahara (笹原 富美雄; born 1945), Japanese judoka
- Hiroki Sasahara (笹原 廣喜; born 1974), Japanese Paralympic athlete
- Kazuya Sasahara (笹原 和也), Japanese anime director
- Shozo Sasahara (笹原 正三; born 1929), Japanese sport wrestler
- Shuhei Sasahara (笹原 脩平; born 1996), Japanese footballer
- Ukyo Sasahara (笹原 右京; born 1996), Japanese racing driver
- Yū Sasahara (篠原 侑), Japanese voice actress
- Yuki Sasahara (笹原 友希; born 1994), Japanese skeleton racer

== Fictional characters ==
- Kenji Sasahara (笹原 完士), protagonist of the manga series Genshiken
