= Motofumi Kobayashi =

Japanese manga artist

Motofumi Kobayashi 小林源文
- Born: January 28, 1951 (age 75) Fukushima Prefecture
- Area: Artist

Motofumi Kobayashi (小林 源文, Kobayashi Motofumi; born January 28, 1951 in Fukushima Prefecture) is a Japanese manga artist. His works include military manga such as Panzergrenadier (装甲擲弾兵), Warrior in Flames -Jochen Peiper (炎の騎士 ヨーヘン・パイパー戦記) & Unternehmen Blau (ブラウ作戦).

== Works ==
Works about World War II:

- The Black Knight Story (黒騎士物語), 1985
- Panzer Vor! (パンツァーフォー！), 1986
- Panzergrenadier (装甲擲弾兵), 1987
- Panzer Krieg (パンツァークリーク), 1988
- Death of the Steel (鋼鉄の死神), 1989 - The biography of Michael Wittmann.
- Warrior in Flames - Jochen Peiper (炎の騎士 ヨーヘン・パイパー戦記), 1990 - The biography of Jochen Peiper.
- Kampfgruppe Zbv (カンプグルッペZbv), 1993
- Happy Tiger (ハッピータイガー), 1993
- Japanisch Frw. Bataillon der Waffen SS (東亜総統特務隊), 1995. - 'Japanese foreign legion of the Waffen-SS.' It's a comedy.
- Unternehmen Barbarossa (バルバロッサ作戦), 2001. - Operation Barbarossa
- Unternehmen Taifun (タイフーン作戦), 2002. - Operation Typhoon
- Unternehmen Blau (ブラウ作戦), 2003. - Operation Blue
- Unternehmen Zitadelle (ツィタデル作戦), 2005. - Operation Zitadelle
- Deutschland Afrika Korps (アフリカ軍団), 2006. - Afrika Korps and the biography of Erwin Rommel.
- Samland 1945 (ザームラント1945), 2007. - Battle of Sambia.

Works about the Vietnam War:

- Cat Shit One (キャットシットワン), 1998
- Vietnam War (ヴェトナムウォー), 1999

Alternate history:

- World War III (第3次世界大戦), 1988
- Battle over Hokkaidō (バトルオーバー北海道), 1989 - Set in 1995, Soviet hardliners assassinate Mikhail Gorbachev and launch a war against NATO and Japan. In the Far East, the Soviet military fights the JSDF in a battle over control of Hokkaidō.
- Raid on Tokyo/Tokyo Wars (トウキョウウォーズ), 1991 - This is a story of the JSDF fighting against the Soviet Army in Tokyo and Niigata.
- Korean War II (第2次朝鮮戦争 ユギオII), 1996
- Samurai Soldier (サムライ・ソルジャー), 1999
- Omega 7 (オメガ7), 2002
- Omega J (オメガJ), 2003

Science Fiction:

- Gatse (ワンマン・アーミー ゲイツ), 1987
- The Time Troopers (タイム・トルーパー), 1989
- HYDT (士官候補生ハイト), 1989

American comic books:

- Psychonauts (with writer Alan Grant, 4-issue mini series, Epic Comics, 1993–1994)

Video games:

- Accele Brid (Character Designer)
