= Planzet =

- Japanese movie poster

Japanese name
- Kana: プランゼット
- Directed by: Jun Awazu
- Written by: Jun Awazu
- Produced by: Jun Awazu; Kazuki Sunami
- Starring: Mamoru Miyano; Kaori Ishihara; Masami Iwasaki; Kenjiro Tsuda; Yuka Terasaki; Junko Takeuchi; Yusaku Yara
- Narrated by: Yusaku Yara
- Music by: Shingo Terasawa
- Production company: CoMix Wave Films
- Distributed by: CoMix Wave; Media Factory
- Release date: May 22, 2010
- Running time: 53 minutes
- Country: Japan
- Language: Japanese

Planzet (プランゼット) is a 2010 Japanese animated film written and directed by Jun Awazu.

== Plot ==
In 2047, an unknown, alien life-form, codenamed FOS, attacks Earth, destroying the world's major cities in one fell swoop. The survivors unite to fight back, and three years later they erect a world shield, the Diffuser, to stop further invasions. Now in 2053, a last, desperate counterattack is being mounted against the FOS. Taishi Akejima, a soldier in the Planetary Defense Forces Alliance, would like nothing better than a shot at the aliens responsible for his father's death six years ago. However, the new offensive requires a powerful weapon to be deployed and the Diffuser to be disabled, leaving the entire planet terribly vulnerable once more. Will humanity regain the stars or lose everything in the final, ultimate gamble?

== Cast ==
In the different language versions, some of the character's names were changed.

=== Taishi Akejima ===
Character name: Taishi Akejima (Japanese), Hiroshi Akishima (English), Hiroshi (French)
Voiced by: Mamoru Miyano (Japanese); Blake Shepard (English), Tony Marot (French)

=== Koyomi Akejima ===
Character name: Koyomi Akejima (Japanese), Koyomi Akishima (English), Koyomi (French)
Voiced by: Kaori Ishihara (Japanese); Brittney Karbowski (English), Jennifer Fauveau (French)

=== Kōshirō Akejima ===
Character name: Kōshirō Akejima (Japanese), Koshiro Akishima (English), Kôshiro (French)
Voiced by: Masami Iwasaki (Japanese); Rob Mungle (English), Marc Brétonnière (French)

=== Ken Tazaki ===
Voiced by: Kenjiro Tsuda (Japanese); Illich Guardiola (English), Jochen Haegele (French)

=== Kaori Sagawa ===
Voiced by: Yuka Terasaki (Japanese); Luci Christian (English), Magali Rosenzweig (French)

=== Yūra Yoshizawa ===
Voiced by: Junko Takeuchi (Japanese); Tiffany Grant (English), Virginie Ledieu (French)

=== Commissioner Yoshizawa ===
Character name: Commissioner Yoshizawa (Japanese), Area Commander Yoshizawa (English), Seiji (French)
Voiced by: Yusaku Yara (Japanese); John Swasey (English), Frédéric Souterelle (French)

=== Nakamura ===
Voiced by: Greg Ayres (English), Grégory Laisné (French)

=== Narrator ===
Voiced by: Yusaku Yara (Japanese); David Wald (English), Bruno Meyere (French)

== Music ==
The ending theme is "Ryūgū no Tsukai" (竜宮の使い) by Chitose Hajime.

== Home media ==
The film was released on Blu-Ray in 2012.
