= Virginie Ledieu =

French voice actress

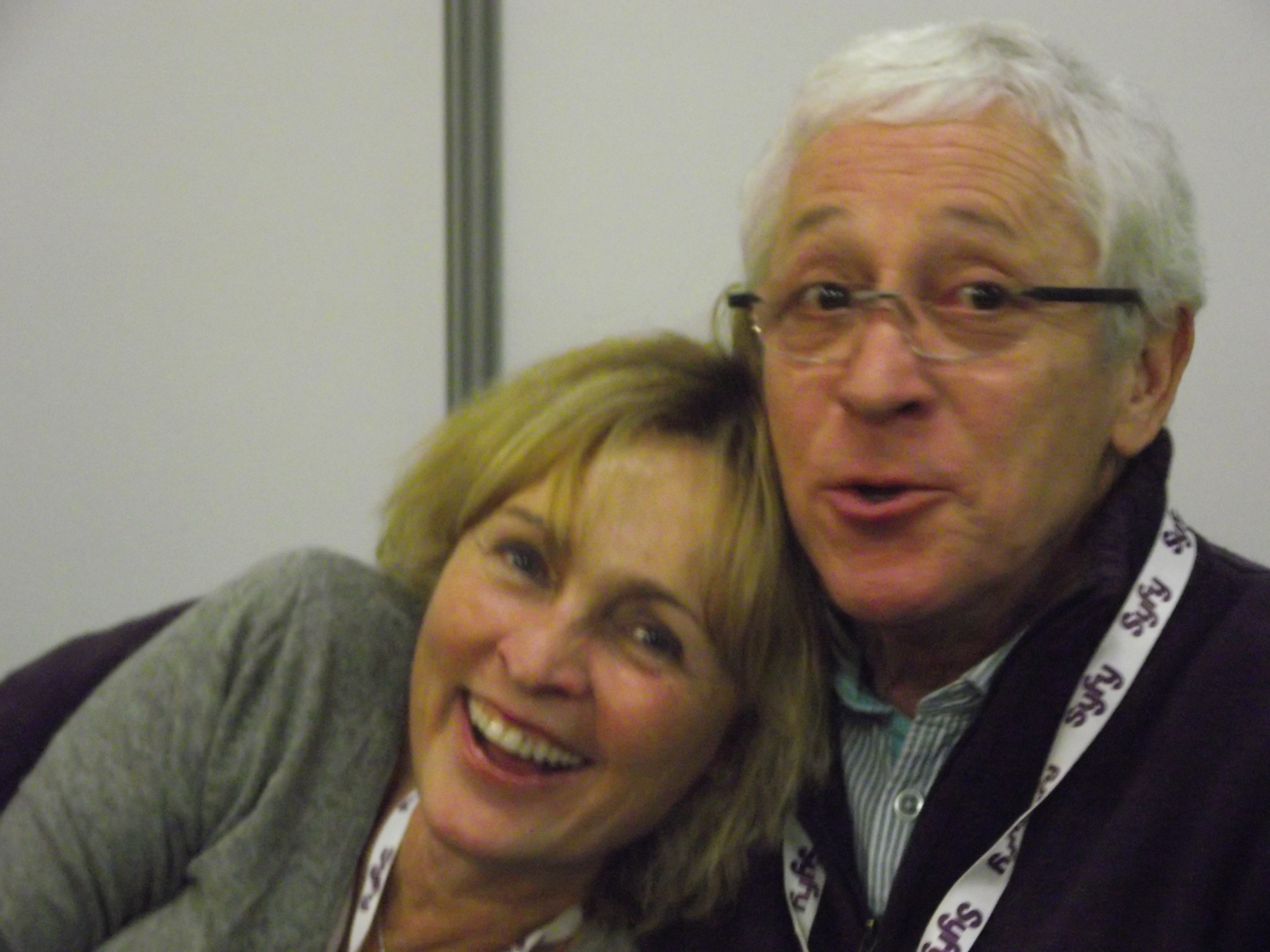
image of Virginie Ledieu

Virginie Ledieu (born August 2, 1960) is a French actress who specializes in dubbing. She is the daughter of Marion Game. She is the official dubbing voice of Alyson Hannigan.

== Voice roles ==
=== Television animation ===
- Chip 'n Dale Rescue Rangers (Gadget Hackwrench (Tress MacNeille))
- Jem (Kimber Benton (Cathianne Blore))
- Love Hina (Mutsumi Otohime (Satsuki Yukino))
- Saint Seiya (Athena (Keiko Han, Fumiko Orikasa))

=== Video games ===
- Crash Bandicoot: The Wrath of Cortex (Coco Bandicoot)
- The Longest Journey (Emma)
- Neverwinter Nights (Linu La'neral)

=== Live action ===
- American Pie (Michelle Flaherty (Alyson Hannigan))
- City of Angels (Maggie (Meg Ryan))
- Dead Calm (Rae Ingram (Nicole Kidman))
- Die Hard 2 (Samantha Coleman (Sheila McCarthy))
- D.O.A. (Sydney Fuller (Meg Ryan))
- Innerspace (Lydia Maxwell (Meg Ryan))
- Lethal Weapon 2 (Rika van den Haas (Patsy Kensit))
