= Cat Shit One =

Japanese manga series

- Cover of Cat Shit One volume 1 as published by Softbank Publishing

キャットシットワン (Kyatto Shitto Wan)
- Manga
- Written by: Motofumi Kobayashi
- Published by: SB Creative
- English publisher: NA / UK: ADV Manga
- Magazine: GameSpot
- Original run: 1998 – 2005
- Volumes: 4
- Original net animation

Cat Shit One: The Animated Series
- Directed by: Kazuya Sasahara
- Produced by: Junya Okabe
- Studio: Studio Anima
- Released: July 17, 2010
- Runtime: 23 minutes
- Episodes: 1
- Manga

Cat Shit One '80
- Written by: Motofumi Kobayashi
- Published by: SB Creative
- Original run: 2008 – 2013
- Volumes: 4

Cat Shit One (Japanese: キャットシットワン, Hepburn: Kyatto Shitto Wan) is a three volume manga series written and illustrated by Motofumi Kobayashi. It was published in North America and the United Kingdom (printed in Canada) in 2004 by ADV Manga. It was also released in Poland in 2006, also under the title Cat Shit One. It has been released in France, Belgium and Spain, as Cat Shit One, by Glénat in 2006.

In 2008, Kobayashi released a follow-up to Cat Shit One – Cat Shit One '80. Currently four volumes have been published in Japan.

A computer-generated original net animation series of Cat Shit One by Studio Anima began release on IDA Entertainment's YouTube channel in Japan from July 17, 2010, and in North America, Australia and New Zealand on February 5, 2011. The animated version is set in the Middle East rather than Vietnam, and a trailer indicates that the action takes place after 1991.

The manga follows three American soldiers (who are anthropomorphic animals) in the Vietnam War named Botasky, Perky and Rats. All three are in the Specialrecon team called "Cat Shit One". Each mission (or chapter) shows the daily activities of the reconnaissance group in Vietnam. There are sections of the manga which give brief history and truths behind the war, such as the types of weapons used by different countries and the activities of forces in the war. At the end of volume one there is a chapter called "Dog Shit One"—separate from the main story—showing human characters.

In Cat Shit One '80, the story continues to follow the three main protagonists as they became involved in various low-intensity conflicts in the 1980s. Perky, now a member of the elite US Army Delta Force, was attached to the British Army Special Air Service and was involved in various SAS operations while Rats and Bota were involved with the US covert operation in Afghanistan against the Soviet invasion.

An animated adaptation of Cat Shit One was released in 2010 and set in the 21st century Middle East during Global War on Terror events; however, it follows the Cat Shit One '80 storyline.

== Character depiction ==
The manga depicts the characters as different animals according to their nationality as follows:

- American – rabbit (from the Japanese word for rabbit: Usagi ("うさぎ"): USA G.I.)
- Vietnamese – Siamese cat
- French – domestic pig (from pigs used to hunt truffles)
- Chinese – panda
- Japanese – Japanese macaque and gorilla
- Russian – brown bear
- Korean – nureongi (from the dog dish bosintang)
- British – rat (from The Desert Rats)
- Australian – kangaroo and koala

The following are new animals depicted in Cat Shit One '80:

- German – Fennec fox (from Desert Fox) and wolf
- Middle Eastern and Pakistan – goat and sheep
- Afghan - camel
- Latin Americans – cow
- Italians - Common raccoon dog

== Main characters ==
- Sergeant Perkins (aka Perky) Voiced by: Hiroshi Tsuchida (Japanese); Will Prescott (English)

An American fuzzy lop soldier and leader of the Cat Shit One recon team, later receiving the rank of Captain. In Cat Shit One '80, Perky, now a major, continues to serve in the Army under Beck with the newly formed Delta Force. He is attached to the British Special Air Service under the command of Sir Michael Rose as the American exchange officer and develops a close personal and professional relationship with GSG 9 commander Ulrich Wegener and GIGN commander Christian Prouteau. Perky is heavily involved in the SAS operations during the Iranian Embassy Siege and the Falklands War.

- Sergeant White (aka Rats)

A Netherland Dwarf rabbit soldier, sniper, and interpreter of English and Vietnamese. Rats, who was born in the Bronx, comes from a humble background and is sympathetic to the plight of those displaced by the war. In Cat Shit One '80, Rats is recruited into the CIA and was sent to Afghanistan to serve as liaison and military advisor for General Massoud and the Mujahideen under his command against the Soviet forces.

- Botasky (aka Bota) Voiced by: Satoshi Hino (Japanese); Tom Flynn (English)

A Dutch rabbit soldier and the radio operator for the group. In the story he is often portrayed as cowardly and racist. After the war, Botasky made a fortune selling fast food and became the chairman of a multinational fast food chain. In Cat Shit One '80, Botasky begins to expand his business to the Asian market and uses his influence with the Chinese government to smuggle Chinese-made weapons into Afghanistan to Rats and Massoud's Mujahideens.

- Chico

A Montagnard (or "Yard") trained by the Americans. He is featured frequently in the story, often bailing Cat Shit One out of jams.

- Beckwith

Major Charlie Beckwith, the commander for the Special Force Detachment B-52, is in charge of the recon team operations. Cat Shit One always receives their orders directly from Beckwith himself. In Cat Shit One '80, Beckwith becomes the commander of Delta Force and is forced to retire due to the failure of Operation Eagle Claw.

- Misha

Introduced in Cat Shit One '80. Misha is a young brown bear that is an inexperienced Soviet VDV second lieutenant sent to Afghanistan to reinforce the Soviet forces in the region. His position was under heavy suicide attack by the Taliban, and he was rescued by Perky and a small SAS detachment. Due to his bravery, he was assigned to a Spetsnaz unit. It's later revealed that Misha is the son of a high-ranking KGB general which his former VDV job was possibly granted through Nepotism.

== Media ==
=== Anime ===
A CG animated ONA adaptation of Cat Shit One was developed by IDA Entertainment. So far, only 1 episode has been released on Japan's YouTube channel on July 17, 2010, with plans for a 12-episode series currently in production, but as of 2023, no further news about this sequel was published. An English dub was released on YouTube on February 5, 2011, and will be independently distributed on DVD and Blu-ray Disc via Amazon in North America. In December 2022, a Kickstarter was launched for a DVD/Blu-Ray/3D Blu-ray set. However the Kickstarter failed to accomplish its goal as it made US$17,350 (approximately 2,246,447 yen) out of its US$77,227 (10,000,000 yen).

No.	Title	Original release date	English release date
1	TBA	July 17, 2010	February 5, 2011
Sergeant "Perky" Perkins and his companion Botasky as private military contractors under CP's orders are sent to a Middle East settlement to retrieve 3 hostages (1 camel and 2 rabbits, one of the male rabbits called Bowen) from a local terrorist group. Yet from each of their binocular view see one of the rabbit hostages tried to escape then got executed by one of the terrorists. As Perkins infiltrates the camp and manages to reach the remaining 2 hostages, Botasky panics after coming under attack when his sniper position is compromised while using his Mk 14 marksman rifle to provide Perkins support, requiring Perkins to help him clear out the remaining terrorists with his KAC SR-47 assault rifle, M1911 pistol and an M67 grenade. After rescued both hostages, Perky and Botasky received CP's intel that enemy reinforcement on trucks will arrive before an Mil Mi-24 helicopter gunship codename "Angel 1" support can, so Perkins orders Botasky to get the hostages to safety while he uses available resources he brought with and the acquired weapons in the settlement to fend off terrorists single-handedly at the time to buy time for Botasky with the hostages. Although Botasky afterwards regathers his courage and returns to Perkins' aid at the critical moment, both of them then end up being pinned down by enemy fire. Just as all hope seems lost, a friendly "angel" arrives in time to provide air support to help save the day as both contractors finished their mission.

== Reception ==
The recent Cat Shit One adaptation was nominated for Outstanding Achievement in an Animated Short category in the 9th Annual VES Awards.

== Notes ==
For the US release, it was retitled as Apocalypse Meow to parody the title of the film Apocalypse Now, which also took place during the Vietnam War.
