= Crayon Shin-chan: Super-Dimension! The Storm Called My Bride =

- Directed by: Akira Shigino
- Written by: Michiko Yokote
- Starring: Akiko Yajima; Keiji Fujiwara; Miki Narahashi; Satomi Kōrogi; Rie Kugimiya; Kenji Utsumi; Nobutoshi Canna
- Production company: Shin-Ei Animation
- Distributed by: Toho
- Release date: 17 April 2010
- Running time: 100 minutes
- Country: Japan
- Language: Japanese
- Box office: $13,723,427

Crayon Shin-chan: Super-Dimension! The Storm Called My Bride (Japanese: クレヨンしんちゃん 超時空！嵐を呼ぶオラの花嫁, Hepburn: Kureyon Shinchan: Chōjikū! Arashi o Yobu Ora no Hanayome), also known as My Bridge Through Space and Time, is a 2010 Japanese anime film. It is the 18th film based on the popular comedy manga and anime series Crayon Shin-chan.

== Plot ==
While playing at the local park, five-year-old Shinnosuke and his four friends Kazama, Nene, Masao and Bo encounter a woman named Tamiko, who claims to be Shinnosuke's fiancée from the future. She says that, twenty years in the future, Shinnosuke had been converted into a stone statue by Tamiko's father, but before being converted into stone, Shinnosuke asked Tamiko to fetch his five-year-old self. Tamiko takes the children into the future via a time machine in order to save the adult Shinnosuke. After reaching the future, Tamiko is ambushed by the bride corps employed by his father Masuzo Kaneari, who take her back to her house. The children seek refuge at the Shinnosuke's house. Here they meet Shinnosuke's parents Hiroshi and Misae.

Hiroshi explains that a few years ago, a large meteorite collided with the Earth, resulting in an impact winter that permanently blocked out the Sun from Earth's skies. Under these circumstances, business magnate Masuzo Kaneari, the founder and president of Kaneari Organic Electronics consolidated political power by providing energy security to the people, leading to him becoming the de-facto ruler of Japan in a corporatocratic environment, where he enjoys absolute monopoly over the markets. Masuzo forcibly shut down all other business establishments in an attempt to uproot competition, which also included Hiroshi's marketing firm 'Futaba Corporation'. The stress caused by the loss of employment caused Hiroshi to become bald and Misae to stress eat, becoming obese.

The adult Shinnosuke Nohara, who retains the care-free nature of his five-year-old self, initially worked under Kaneari, but not feeling satisfied working as a typical salaryman, resigns from his job, bluntly stating to Kaneari that he didn't enjoy working under him. This earned him the hatred of Kaneari, who being accustomed to wielding absolute power, couldn't swallow such defiance of his authority. Kaneari's daughter Tamiko, a rebellious girl who had no interest in participating in her father's business, was attracted to Shinnosuke due to his soft demeanor towards her in contrast to her father, who viewed her as a mere product and him daring to defy her dictatorial father, which also displeased Kaneari. In order to prevent Shinnosuke from wielding his invention, Masuzo had him bio-coated into stone by the action of a beam. He then coerced Tamiko to marry his assistant, the adult Kazama, threatening to destroy the petrified Shinnosuke if she refused to marry the groom of his choice.

The children get to know about Tamiko's engagement to Kazama via television and decided to infiltrate the wedding venue with the help of Hiroshi and Misae. However, they are caught by the bride corps, who try to escort them out. As the civil ceremony progresses while the children are being heckled by the guards, five-year-old Shin-chan is deeply angered and accuses Tamiko of betraying the adult Shinnosuke. Deeply stung at this accusation, Tamiko walks out of the wedding aisle, despite her father's attempts to restrain her and helps the five-year-old Shin-chan identify the petrified adult Shinnosuke out of the many statues of Action Kamen in the site. Kaneari, angered at her daughter's defiance, triggers the exlosion of the pedestal of the petrified Shinnosuke. While everybody, including the adult Kazama were shocked at the turn of events, thinking that Kaneari had genuinely killed Shinnosuke, the five-year-old Shin-chan continued to remain resolute, in spite witnessing the death of his own adult self, insisting that the adult Shinnosuke is unharmed. At this point the adult Bo, now a scientist, who had seen all the events on television, arrives on the spot and confirms that the adult Shinnosuke is alive. He reveals the footage from his cameras, showing that the five-year-old Shin-chan had accidentally unlocked the locks holding down the feet of petrified Shinnosuke to the pedestal and the explosion's impact hadn't blown him out, but actually had him displaced from the spot, resulting him ending up in Kaneari-land, an amusement park owned by Kaneari (a parody of Disneyland), situated far away from the wedding venue.

Kaneari tries to restrain them from leaving the venue by destroying the site through a giant robot. The adult Kazama tries to restrain Kaneari, after the latter sacks him for telling him to relax, but to no avail. At this point, they are joined by the adult Nene (who is now a kindergarten teacher employed at the same Futaba Kindergarten where she used to study at the age of five), adult Masao (a retail store owner who draws manga at his spare time and is married to Nene) and adult Himawari. While Tamiko and the five-year-old Shin-chan go to Kaneari-land on Himawari's motorbike, the rest of them board inside Bo's giant robot and duel Kaneari lodged inside his robot.

At Kaneari-land, Tamiko and the five-year-old Shin-chan find the petrified adult Shinnosuke on an empty roller coaster car. Shin-chan is unable to revive the petrified Shinnosuke. Seeing that the car was travelling on an unfinished line abruptly ending at a high altitude, a steep drop from where meant a certain death, Tamiko drops the five-year-old Shin-chan at a safe spot and decides to remain in the car in order to die side-by-side her love, the petrified Shinnosuke. The five-year-old Shin-chan however held on to the car. Later, the petrified Shinnosuke begins to reanimate. In the meantime, Bo's robot, now manned by Hiroshi, defeats Kaneari's robot and saves the three of them.

After landing back to ground, the adult Shinnosuke combines his Obaka power (an energy which according to the adult Bo, develops only in those people who defy the norms, thereby granting them unusual supernatural powers) with that of the five-year-old Shin-chan to disperse the layer of dust on the sky, bringing an end to the long impact winter. He then explains to his own five-year-old self, that the reason he asked Tamiko to summon him, was because he realised that the Obaka power of his adult self wasn't enough to end the winter and the reason he wanted the winter to end was simply to see beautiful young women wearing skimpy swimming costumes basking under sunshine, thereby revealing that the adult Shinnosuke continued to hold on to this trait also possessed by his five-year-old self, father and grandfather. The end of the winter meant the end of Masuzo Kaneari's rule over Japan. Meanwhile, the adult Himawari revealed herself to be a police officer, who then proceeds to arrest Kaneari on charges of kidnapping, criminal conspiracy and other charges.

As Shin-chan and his friends return to the present, he is relieved to see his parents in their original state, while they are watching a news report about a forthcoming dangerous meteorite with a low chance of collision. The film ends with shooting stars visible in the sky.

== Cast ==
- Akiko Yajima - Shinnosuke Nohara alias Shin-chan, Tamiko's fiancé/husband
- Keiji Fujiwara - Hiroshi Nohara
- Miki Narahashi - Misae Nohara
- Satomi Kōrogi - Himawari Nohara
- Rie Kugimiya - Tamiko Kaneari/Tamiko Nohara, Shinchan's fiancé/wife
- Kenji Utsumi - Masuzo Kaneari, Tamiko's father and Shinchan's father-in-law
- Nobutoshi Canna - Adult Shinnosuke/Shinchan, Tamiko's husband.
- Mari Mashiba as Toru Kazama and Shiro
- Tamao Hayashi as Nene Sakurada
- Teiyū Ichiryūsai as Masao Sato
- Chie Satō as Bo Suzuki

== International release ==
It was released in India on 28 September 2013 on Hungama TV as Shin Chan The Movie Villain aur Dulhan.
