= Kazuya Sasahara =

Japanese film director

- 笹原和也
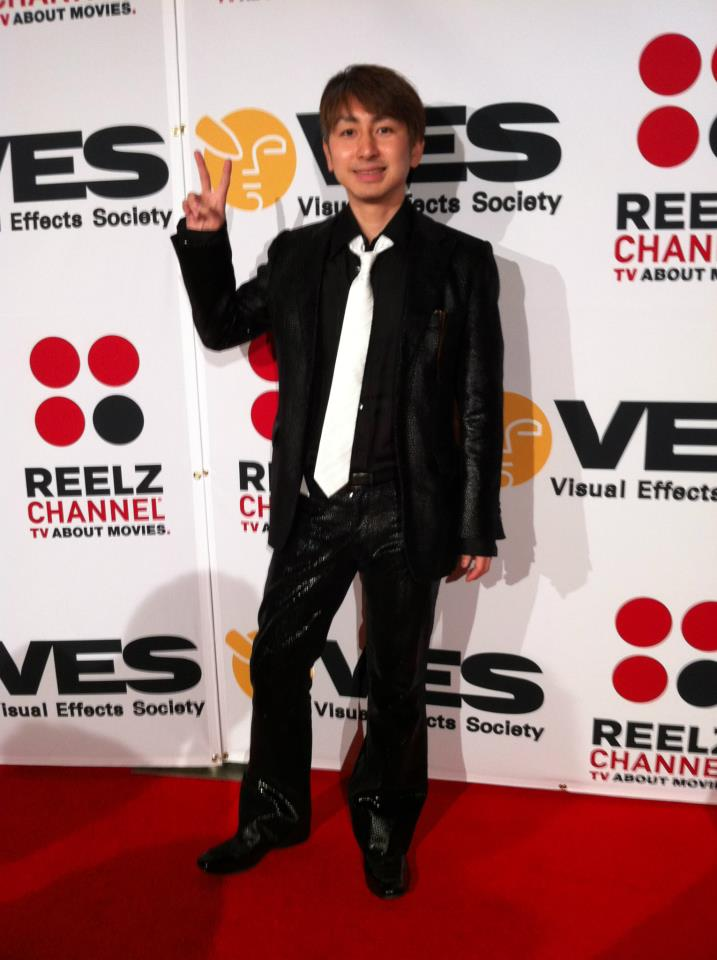
- Occupations: Animation director and CG designer
- Notable work: Cat Shit One

Kazuya Sasahara (笹原和也, Sasahara Kazuya) is a Japanese animation director, CG designer, CG director.

== Career ==
After dropping out from Musashino Art University, he started his career in 3DCG, inspired by his teacher Mitsuru Kaneko. In 1995, he received Best Award in Digital Entertainment Program, sponsored by Sony Music Entertainment Japan.

In 1997, he founded Sasahara Gumi Ltd., which will change its name to Anima Inc.

In December 2012, he left Anima Inc. and moved to a movie production company, ILCA Inc.

He uses LightWave 3D for production, and through his interest in education of 3DCG artists, made significant effect in the popularity of the software in Japan.

In 2011, his work Cat Shit One as director was nominated for 9th Annual VES Awards in Animated Short category, sponsored by Visual Effects Society.

In 2014, his project Dai-Shogun - Great Revolution was decided to be adopted as TV animation series. He took the role of CG Movie Director for the Pachinko arcade machines based on the anime.

In November 2015, the 3D animation project for the Dai-Shogun series has been announced. The project is planned to be crowdfunded through Kickstarter.

== Works ==
=== Video games ===
- Biohazard Code: Veronica (Movie, Production)
- Drag-on Dragoon (In-game Movie Direction)
- Dororo (film) (Opening Movie Direction)
- Berserk: Millennium Falcon Hen Seima Senki no Shō (Production)
- BelleIsle MMORPG (Movie Direction)
- Heavy Metal Thunder (video game) (Movie Production)
- Shinobido: Way of the Ninja (Opening Movie Direction)
- Project Sylpheed (Movie Direction)
- Oneechanbara VorteX (Movie Direction)

=== Film ===
- Cat Shit One (Script, Direction)

=== Anime ===
- Dai-Shogun - Great Revolution (Original Project planning)

=== Television ===
- Choukou Senshi Changéríon (CG)
