= Loop8: Summer of Gods =

2023 role-playing video game

- Developers: Marvelous; Sieg Games
- Publisher: Marvelous Entertainment: NA: Xseed Games
- Producer: Yoichi Miyaji
- Composer: Noriyuki Iwadare
- Platforms: Nintendo Switch, PlayStation 4, Xbox One, Windows
- Release: PS4, Switch, Xbox One, Windows: JP: June 1, 2023; WW: June 6, 2023
- Genre: Role-playing
- Mode: Single-player

Loop8: Summer of Gods is a role-playing video game developed by Sieg Games and published by Marvelous Entertainment and XSeed Games. It released in June 2023 for Nintendo Switch, PlayStation 4, Xbox One, and Windows.

== Gameplay ==
Loop8 plays as a story-heavy JRPG with turn-based battles. The story is advanced through reading text and selecting response options through a dialogue tree. Multiple paths and endings occur based on said choices. Time management is also an aspect of gameplay - the game plays out on a calendar system, with various actions and choices taking up units of time. Character's moods and reactions vary based on when in the story they are addressed by the player.

== Story ==
The game takes place in the fictional Japanese town of Ashihara in 1983 in an alternate reality where humanity is fighting for its survival against demons called Kegai. The game follows the main character Nini, a male teenager who grew up in a space station that was destroyed by the Kegai. He is the sole survivor, and after it, becomes gifted with the special ability "demon sight", the ability to see what other characters are thinking and how they are feeling. Nini can also reset events and try them again, either by failing to save the world, or manually resetting by speaking to a certain character. Nini finds refuge in Ashihara in August, and spends his time making connections in the town in efforts to find the Kegai before they destroy Ashihara as well. The game's title of Loop8 refers to its premise, as Nini continually relives ("loops") his time in the month of August (the eighth month) to find and eliminate the Kegai.

=== Plot ===
On August 1, 1983, Nini arrives in Ashihara and is welcomed by Konoha, a relative from his Earth family, the Oyama, an ancient clan of sorcerers that holds major political power in Japan. The next day, Konoha takes Nini to school to finalize his enrollment paperwork, where he is introduced to Kuni, his homeroom teacher.

On August 3, Nini heads to school for supplementary classes. He notices a gigantic, transparent sphere floating in the sky over the town's mountain, which no one else seems to acknowledge. At the beginning of the first period, a student with fox ears and tail, Beni, announces that a Kegai will soon launch a full-scale attack on the town. Kuni and Micchi, a girl in class, don't seem to acknowledge Beni, while the only other boy in class, Saru, drags Beni away. Konoha handwaves the announcement as Beni's "quirk." Kuni then comes to her senses and introduces the other new student, Ichika, who claims to be here to protect everyone's peaceful lives. Konoha reacts negatively to Ichika's arrival. After school, Nini visits the shrine and meets Musasa, a flying squirrel god and a messenger of higher-ranking Shinto gods of the Celestial Realm, who delivers to him a blessing from the goddess Sakuya and tells him to check mini-shrines scattered around town often to receive more blessings.

On August 4, a Kegai infiltrates the town, leaving behind a trail of shredded paper talismans. Nini investigates and finds that a gateway to Yomotsu Hirasaka, the underworld, has opened up at the shrine. Beni and Ichika also arrive, and Beni identifies Ichika as the Oyama clan's "God Slayer," an anti-Kegai warrior deliberately possessed by a god who enables her to wield divine power. Beni reveals that she herself is a fox goddess who has come to combat the Kegai, and proposes that they act together. The three enter Yomotsu Hirasaka and manage to vanquish a minor Kegai, but are easily killed by Kukunochi, a gigantic plant-based Kegai and a former god of trees. Kukunochi conjures a forest that engulfs the whole world, killing all humans.

In the afterlife, a voice tells Nini to continue the "mission" he himself has willed to carry out, and Nini reawakens on August 1, at the moment he arrives in Ashihara.

The second loop onward begins with Konoha making an offhanded comment on how they "meet again." August 1 and 2's events proceed mostly as they did the first loop, but once Nini goes to school on August 3 or later, some details start to diverge such as him meeting Kuni for the first time then instead of on August 2, and Ichika already being present as a student rather than a new arrival. The school is also visited by several people who weren't there before: Nanachi, a geeky boy who offers to help Nini out with anything he might need in exchange for stories about his life in space; Takako, a younger girl from another school who immediately considers Nini a sort of brother figure she could boss around; Hori, a slightly older boy who seems to think Nini is his father; Max, a German teacher who expresses condolences to Nini's loss of family and encourages him to be strong; Hazuchi-Machina, Max's daughter and an eccentric girl who enjoys people's reactions to her antics; and Terasu, a mysterious woman who can manually loop Nini back to August 1.

At this point, the player is free to decide Nini's activities however they wish, with the only mandatory activity being to enter Yomotsu Hirasaka and combat the Kegai before each one destroys Earth. Building relationships with characters and triggering events will reveal not only details about their personal lives but also explanations about the Kegai conflict, the roles and interventions of the gods, the nature of the Oyama clan, and Nini's self-imposed "mission," among other things.

=== Endings ===
Depending on the relationships Nini has built, whether or not everyone survives, if Nini is killed in battle, or if the Kegai threat is ignored, the story can reach 14 different good endings and 6 bad endings:

- If Nini is killed in any Kegai battle, or if the player fails to reach any of the six major Kegai battles before the deadline, the Kegai will destroy humanity and threaten the Celestial Realm, at which point time is automatically looped back to August 1.
- At the end of the final Kegai battle, if the player chooses to save Konoha, the Kegai threat will overrun the Celestial Realm, freeing Earth from the time loop and the interventions of the gods, but most of humanity is destroyed and the dead reemerge in the world of the living. Nini and Konoha live on, happy that they have each other, and Konoha reassures that they can salvage the situation somehow.
- If the player chooses to save the world and Nini is close to Konoha or not particularly close with any of the other characters, the Kegai threat on humanity will be completely eliminated but Konoha is killed. Nini finds that he is alone with no particular purpose in life, so he leaves Ashihara to find purpose elsewhere.
- If the player chooses to save the world and Nini is close with any character aside from Konoha, he will reach one of the 11 character endings where he continues his friendship or romantic relationship with them. Micchi, Nanachi, Kuni, Max, and Takako have special epilogues that depict their lives and relationships with Nini further into the future if their endings are achieved.
- If every character is alive and Nini is close to Konoha, the player has the option to "resist fate." If chosen, Nini severs the "thread of fate" connecting Earth to the Celestial Realm, freeing Earth from the time loop and the interventions of the gods. Konoha is saved, and the Kegai are eventually wiped out. Nini and Konoha leave Ashihara unannounced to live elsewhere. Some time later, Terasu and Musasa are about to go track them down when they cross paths at the train station, back for a visit. A special epilogue is also unlocked, which depicts Nini and Konoha's relationship further into the future.

== Characters ==
=== Main characters ===
Referred to as Warriors of Hope, individuals with strong spiritual powers or special connections to the divinity, chosen by the gods of the Celestial Realm as proxies for their interventions in the course of Earth's history. Their actions and motivations are influenced by the gods (and in Nini's case, the player) via the OVERS System, a fictional software with which extradimensional entities partially control individuals via processes akin to possession or hypnotic suggestion. In effect, they are compelled to defend Earth as well as the Celestial Realm from destruction.

Nini (ニニ, Nini) / Novus Nemo (ノウス ネモ, Nōsu Nemo) / Taichiro Oyama (大山 太一郎, Ōyama Taichirō)
Voiced by: Gakuto Kajiwara (JP), Griffin Puatu (EN)
The game's protagonist. A boy born on a space station known as the Hope, and the sole survivor of the Kegai attack that destroyed his home. After spending some time in physical rehabilitation to acclimate himself to Earth's gravity, he transfers to Ashihara High as a freshman, and must now navigate the unfamiliar customs of Earth and Japan. He possesses the Demon Sight, which lets him see spirits and the Celestial Realm, among other things normal people wouldn't see.
His actions are influenced by two extradimensional entities: Ninigi no Mikoto, his ancestral god who has possessed him since birth; and the player, who takes over at the start of the game. In the web novel, it is revealed that he and the other Warriors of Hope have been unsuccessfully fighting the Kegai for an unspecified number of loops before the player comes into the picture.
In combat, he wields a spear and can summon lightning strikes via sorcery. With the Demon Sight, he can sense his allies and enemies' emotional states and predict the actions they will take.

Ichika (イチカ, Ichika) / Ichika Oyama (大山 朔夜, Ōyama Ichika)
Voiced by: Aoi Koga (JP), Cristina Vee Valenzuela (EN)
A girl who transfers to Ashihara High at the same time as Nini. A prim and proper young lady, she was raised from childhood to serve as a God Slayer, the Oyama clan's anti-Kegai weapon. Her isolated upbringing, lack of real-world experience, and initial no-nonsense attitude mean that she's often misunderstood by those around her.
She is possessed by Konohanasakuya-hime, her ancestral goddess and wife of Ninigi no Mikoto, who gradually influences her personality to be more gentle and open-minded, and enhances her combat capabilities with divine power. In combat, she wields a katana.
Initially, she claims not to have a surname, but towards the end of the game and if Nini develops a relationship with her, he learns that she is Konoha's sister, separated when they were little due to Konoha's lacking divine power and compatibility with her god. In the web novel, it is revealed that she is under a mind control spell to make sure she doesn't stray from the Oyama clan's mission, though it is dispelled following an encounter with Terasu.

Saru (サル, Saru) / Kunihiko Sawada (沢田 邦彦, Sawada Kunihiko)
Voiced by: Ryota Suzuki (JP), Griffin Burns (EN)
An athletic boy born and raised in Ashihara, currently a freshman at Ashihara High. Lost his father when he was very young. His ability to climb trees faster than any monkey earned his nickname, Saru, which means "monkey" in Japanese. While great at sports, his grades leave something to be desired.
Since birth, he has been possessed by Sarutahiko Ōkami, his family's ancestral god, whose influence causes him to feel duty-bound to defend Ashihara. In combat, he wields an oversized staking mallet, which he borrows from the school's gardening club.
In the web novel, it is shown that he's the captain of the school's baseball club, though the only members are him and an unnamed girl who insists on calling him a senpai despite them being the same age. The night the Hope space station was destroyed, he watched it fall to pieces and burn upon falling through Earth's atmosphere, thinking it was a meteor shower. As a result, he feels guilty toward Nini and is determined to make the latter feel welcome in Ashihara.

Hori (ホオリ, Hōri) / Sachi Hori (火折 幸, Hōri Sachi)
Voiced by: Taku Yashiro (JP), Daman Mills (EN)
A freshman at Ashihara High, who transferred earlier in the year. He is a year older than the others due to an accident that caused him to miss a year of school. Surfs well enough to participate in national competitions. While quite handsome, he seems uninterested in women, and is always meddling in Nini's affairs.
Since birth, he has been possessed by Hoori no Mikoto, son of Ninigi no Mikoto, whose influence causes him to call Nini his "dad" (in the English localization, he calls him by his god's name, Ninigi) and Ichika his "mom," and wish for his "family" to be reunited. In combat, he wields a bow and arrows.
In the web novel, it is shown that Hoori no Mikoto's influence on him was minimal until the bus accident that caused his injury, after which he starts to act on Hoori no Mikoto's suggestions, misinterpreting them as memories of a past life.

Machina (マキナ, Makina) / Hazuchi-Machina Rothborden (ハヅチ＝マキナ・ロートボーデン, Hazuchi Makina Rōtobōden)
Voiced by: Maki Kawase (JP), Jennifer Losi (EN)
Max's "daughter," and an eccentric robot girl who struggles to act fully human. She empathizes with Nini's outsider-ness and failure to fully integrate into Earth's society. Fights the Kegai every night under her father's orders. When not battling the Kegai, she spends her free time knitting.
In combat, she uses her fists, firearms, and laser blasts.
In the web novel, it is revealed that she is possessed by the goddess Takehazuchi, who contacted her shortly after she gained self-awareness but before her body could move. When Max failed to set up a miniature nuclear power source to generate enough energy for Machina's functions, Takehazuchi sent knowledge of advanced technology from another world to Machina via the OVERS System, enabling her to successfully set herself up. In another chapter, it is revealed that she was initially largely emotionless, and her cheerful, eccentric personality was created following her interaction with Terasu, who advises her to act more friendly.

=== Civilians ===
Inhabitants of Ashihara Nakatsu, a fictional port town in western Japan facing the Seto Inland Sea. They are acquainted with the Warriors of Hope, and throughout August, each of them (except for Terasu) is possessed by a powerful Kegai who takes advantage of their insecurities or desires. Whether or not they can be saved depends on their relationships with the Warriors of Hope who face them in combat, with Nini having an especially large influence.

Konoha (コノハ, Konoha) / Konoha Oyama (大山 木葉, Ōyama Konoha)
Voiced by: Azumi Waki (JP), Xanthe Huynh (EN)
A freshman at Ashihara High and a member of the Oyama clan. Claims to be Nini's cousin, but is actually a more distant relative. A warm, motherly figure who takes care of Nini when he moves into her home.
As a child, she was trained to be a God Slayer, but was passed over and sent away to live with Teruko in Ashihara due to her weak divine power and the apparent lack of combat capabilities of her goddess, Iwanaga Hime. Though most individuals possessed by god have a name that represents their divine entity, Konoha does not due to Iwanaga Hime influencing events to make her have a name that represents Konohanasakuya-hime instead.
After five major Kegai are defeated, Iwanaga Hime deliberately turns herself into a Kegai, using Konoha as her vessel in a bid to physically manifest on Earth and claim Ninigi no Mikoto for herself. As Iwanaga Hime is the game's final boss, Konoha's fate depends on her relationship with Nini and the decision the player makes at the end of the final battle.

Micchi (ミッチ, Micchi) / Michiko Hiume (飛梅 三智子, Hiume Michiko)
Voiced by: Mina Nakazawa (JP), Erin Yvette (EN)
A freshman at Ashihara High and a bookworm who has always studied hard to secure a bright future for herself. When the Kegai threat closed the library, her only sanctuary, she began to feel ostracized by society at large.
Family circumstances forced her to move to Ashihara earlier in the year, leaving her bitter and angry to the point where she wishes the whole world would just disappear. The Kegai Kukunochi takes advantage of this desire for destruction to possess her.
If Nini develops a relationship with her, her yandere tendencies will start to show, possibly culminating in her stabbing Nini to death so she can keep him to herself forever. Unlike Nini's deaths in battle initiating a new time loop, dying this way results in a game over, sending the player back to the game's title screen.

Nanachi (ナナチ, Nanachi) / Nanachi Suhisa (須久 那那智, Suhisa Nanachi)
Voiced by: Yu Miyazaki (JP), Caleb Yen (EN)
A freshman at Ashihara High and self-described otaku. His parents meant to name him Nachi (那智, Nachi), but they accidentally wrote the first kanji character twice on his birth certificate, resulting in "Nanachi" instead. His many hobbies include building railroad models, making dioramas, and researching the occult. When Nini arrived in Ashihara, he was genuinely delighted to have an actual extraterrestrial attending his school. In the English localization, he gives Nini a nickname, "Starman." Although he comes across as a typical otaku, he has a sensitive side only seen by those he considers close friends. He dreams of reincarnating into another world and finding true love there.
Learning of Nini and the Warriors of Hope's ongoing battle against the Kegai, he takes it upon himself to assist them. Though he makes decent progress in researching the occult and discovers that his spiritual power is surprisingly high, a botched summoning experiment results in him being possessed by the Kegai Shinatsuhiko.

Takako (タカコ, Takako) / Takako Wakakuni (若国 高子, Wakakuni Takako)
Voiced by: Yuna Taniguchi (JP), Yolis Arroyo (EN)
A 6th grader who hangs out at Ashihara High, who seeks friends outside of her age group due to being teased by classmates for her height and extraordinary academic performance, even going so far as to call herself a junior high school student in spirit. In her eagerness to be treated more like a grown-up, she often acts out, and describes herself as the baddest girl in town. She also demands that everybody treat her like their little sister and shower her with affection. In fact, she's desperately lonely and latched onto Nini because he seemed like a real pushover. After claiming him as her big brother, she quickly becomes a cheerful presence in his everyday life.
As she witnesses Nini develop relationships with other people aside from her, the growing feeling of jealousy becomes a vulnerability that the Kegai Izanami exploits to possess her.

Kuni (クニ, Kuni) / Kunie Enan (江南 邦江, Enan Kunie)
Voiced by: Tomo Muranaka (JP), Suzie Yeung (EN)
A single woman in her late 20s who lives alone in Ashihara, and one of the few remaining teachers at Ashihara High. Even as the Kegai threaten humanity's very existence, she pushes her students to achieve academic excellence. Although many of them have grown fed up with her pushy behavior, her passion stems from a genuine concern for their futures. As a firm believer in science, she thinks that a giant conspiracy or freak phenomenon is to blame for the current state of the world.
Her growing frustration with the state of the world eventually results in her being possessed by the Kegai Kagutsuchi. Unlike the 4 other major Kegai who wish to destroy the Celestial Realm or have ulterior motives, Kagutsuchi genuinely wanted to help Kuni but only ran rampant due to his inability to control his strength.
In the web novel, it is revealed that her family is descended from Kuninotokotachi no Mikoto, which is partially the cause of her unusually high resistance against spiritual and divine powers.

Max (マックス, Makkusu) / Baldur Max (バルドゥル・マックス, Baruduru Makkusu)
Voiced by: Daiki Hamano (JP), Crispin Freeman (EN)
A single thirty-something German native who teaches at Ashihara High alongside Kuni. Designed and created Machina, who recognizes him as her father. Lost his younger sister to the Kegai while living in Germany, and seeks to avenge her death by secretly designing a mechanical weapon that combines science and sorcery. As a fellow outsider, he empathizes with Nini's struggle to adapt to a new country and culture.
His research into sorcery eventually leads him to dabble in necromancy, though his attempt to bring back his family only results in him summoning, and getting possessed by, the Kegai Wadatsumi instead.

Terasu (テラス, Terasu) / Teruko Oyama (大山 照子, Ōyama Teruko)
Voiced by: Atsumi Tanezaki (JP), Kimberly Woods (EN)
Sister of the head of the Oyama clan. Used to live with Konoha, but now drifts around Ashihara as an unemployed camper. Since time flowed differently on Nini's space station compared to Earth, she's Nini's grandmother at a youthful 29 years of age. Her husband and daughter left for space a mere two years ago, so discovering she had a grandson was quite a shock. She's fond of calling Nini "Sonny Boy."
She is possessed by Amaterasu, her ancestral goddess who, as one of the most powerful Shinto deities, has the ability to revert the universe to an earlier point in time. She was also trained to be a God Slayer from childhood, but when the Oyama clan found that Amaterasu lacked combat capabilities, she was relieved of her duties and sent away to live in Ashihara.

=== Gods ===
Beni (ベニ, Beni) / Benihime Tenno (紅姫天王, Benihime Tennō)
Voiced by: Megu Umezawa (JP), Risa Mei (EN)
A fox goddess sent by her mentor, Ukanomitama no Mikoto, to defend Ashihara against the Kegai. "Benihime" was her original human name, and she still remembers some of her old life. Looks like an ordinary girl to most people, but Nini's Demon Sight lets him see her fox form. After learning that Nini has this ability, she decides to weaponize it in the battle against the Kegai.
In combat, she wields a bladed hand fan and invokes divine sorcery via ceremonial dances.

Musasa (ムササ, Musasa)
Voiced by: Atsumi Tanezaki (JP), Paula Rhodes (EN)
A mischievous flying squirrel god who acts as an envoy for gods who avoid communicating directly with humanity. Delivers blessings to Nini and the other townsfolk.

== Development and release ==
Loop8 was first announced for the Nintendo Switch in a Japanese Nintendo Direct in February 2022. It was later revealed to be coming to the PlayStation 4, Xbox One, and Windows platforms as well. The game is being developed by Sieg Games and published by XSeed Games and Marvelous Entertainment. The game is being produced by Yoichi Miyaji, who previously worked on entries in the Lunar and Grandia games. The game's designer and scenario writer, Yuri Shibamura, went to great lengths to capture the nostalgic and iconic aspects of Japan and its culture, particularly from the 1980s. Loop8 is considered a spiritual successor to Shibamura's previous game for the PlayStation Gunparade March. The game's soundtrack, along with theme song, "Love's Sweet Sorrow", was composed by music veteran Noriyuki Iwadare.

Originally, the game was announced for a late 2022 release only in Japan. It was later delayed into March 2023, and then another time to June 1, 2023. An English version of the game was later announced, and was scheduled to release days later on June 6, 2023. The delays were to add extra time to polish gameplay.

27 chapters of Loop8-related web novels were published on the game's Japanese website to promote the game. 7 chapters of the web novel were translated into English and came in a booklet included with the game's physical copies for Nintendo Switch, Playstation 4, and Xbox One.

== Reception ==
Reception

Aggregate score
Aggregator	Score
Metacritic	(NS) 49/100 (PS4) 49/100

Review scores
Publication	Score
Destructoid	5/10
Nintendo Life	5/10

According to review aggregator Metacritic, Loop8 received "generally unfavorable" reviews for both the Nintendo Switch and PlayStation 4 versions. Destructoid favorably compared Loop8 to the Persona series of video games prior to release. Scott Adams of The OuterHaven who reviewed the full game described it as fantastic, praising the visuals, sound, and relationship mechanic, despite some issues with the game design.

Several other publications were less positive, with Cullen Black of RPG Site describing it as full of great ideas that never come together. George Yang of Nintendo Life's view was that it fails to leave an emotional impact towards the end and is repetitive and frustrating. Thomas Knight of NookGaming and Jenny Jones of Push Square echoed the criticism of its repetitive nature, mentioning going over the same conversations repeatedly. Thomas Knight also mentioned issues with inconsistency in conversations too, with events happening earlier than they should or in the wrong order.

The Nintendo Switch version of Loop8: Summer of Gods was the ninth bestselling retail game during its first week of release in Japan, with 5,796 physical copies being sold. The PlayStation 4 version was the sixteenth bestselling retail game in Japan throughout the same week, selling 2,775 physical copies.
