= Megu Umezawa =

Japanese actress

- 梅澤 めぐ
- Born: May 12; Hokkaido, Japan
- Occupations: Actress; voice actress
- Years active: 2020-present
- Agent: Tokyo Actor's Consumer's Cooperative Society
- Height: 154 cm (5 ft 1 in)

Megu Umezawa (梅澤 めぐ, Umezawa Megu; born May 12) is a Japanese voice actress from Hokkaido, Japan, who is affiliated with the Tokyo Actor's Consumer's Cooperative Society.

== Biography ==
In April 2020, she joined the Tokyo Actor Consumers' Cooperative Association. In the same year, she moved to Tokyo from Hokkaido. In September of the same year, her official Twitter account was opened, and on the same day, she announced on Twitter that she would be playing the role of Akari Tsujino in The Idolmaster Cinderella Girls. The character she played, "Akari Tsujino", won the Top 20 Words Award (18th place) in the "Internet Buzzwords 100 2020", and she appeared at the awards ceremony on behalf of the character.

In December, she announced on Twitter that her own program, Megu Umezawa's Encounters, would start on Niconico Channel in 2021. The program began in February 2021.

== Personality ==
In her official profile, she lists soccer and ball-jumping as her special skills, and drawing, making french fries, and listening to and answering people's problems as her hobbies. She has been playing soccer for about 7–8 years since she was in the second grade of elementary school, and even served as captain of her club. When she was a soccer girl, she had a very short haircut and was tanned, so she was sometimes mistaken for a boy. She was the weekly narrator for DAZN's "Yabechi Stadium," which aired on June 26, 2022, and was able to work on soccer-related jobs.

Her first work as a voice actress was The Idolmaster Cinderella Girls. According to her co-star Miyu Tomita, she came to the set shaking, and her hands were shaking even when reading the script.

== Filmography ==
=== Anime ===
2020

- Chimimo as Schoolgirl A, Nui's friend

2025

- Mashin Creator Wataru as Maro
- Watari-kun's ****** Is About to Collapse as Makina Umezawa

=== Web animation ===
2020

- The Idolmaster Cinderella Girls Theater Extra Stage as Akari Tsujino

2022

- Taiko no Tatsujin Anime Version! as Kumokyun
- Cinderella Girls 10th Anniversary Celebration Animation Eternity Memories as Akari Tsujino
- iRonas as Kanade Sonozaka

=== Video games ===
- The Idomaster Cinderella Girls and The Idomaster Cinderella Girls: Starlight Stage as Akari Tsujino
- Brave Nine as Moi

2021

- Sen no Kaizoku as Rinlee
- Shirohime Project: Re ~Castle Defense~ as Oka Castle (second voice)
- Shadowverse as Akari Tsujino
- Monster Strike as Hamaji/Hamajime, Tropiel
- Kemono Friends 3 as De Brazza's monkey

2022

- Gyakuten Othellonia as Tepuru
- Kantai Collection as Ume, Abyssal Plum Princess
- Taiko no Tatsujin: Rhythm Festival as Kumokyun
- Infinity Souls as Akira Mitani
- BraveSword x BlazeSoul as Steam Gun Baden

2022

- Quiz RPG: Wizard and the Black Cat Wiz as Ussana Usami
- Loop8: Summer of Gods as Beni

2024

- Granblue Fantasy as Bonnie

2025

- Honkai Impact 3rd as Bailu Youyun

2026

- Blue Archive as Kinui Rena
