= List of The Laughing Salesman episodes =

The anime television series The Laughing Salesman is based on the Japanese manga series of the same name created by Fujiko A. Fujio. The first animated series was produced by Shin-Ei Animation and commenced screening on TBS as part of the Gimme a Break variety show on 17 October 1989 and extended for three seasons with a total of 117 episodes which included 9 specials and 1 prologue pilot. The series consists of stories adapted from the manga as well as brand new original stories created for the anime.

The series began with a short 4 minute prologue and each episode is 10 minutes in length. A number of specials were also released, often double-length and containing two separate self-contained stories. The names of the characters in the summaries are written in the Japanese order to obtain the alternate meaning or reference when both names are read aloud.

== Season 1 ==
The first animated series was produced by Shin-Ei Animation and commenced screening on TBS as part of the Gimme a Break variety show on 17 October 1989. The series was directed by Toshirō Kuni with scripts by Yasuo Tanami and music by Kōhei Tanaka.

No. overall	No. in series	Title	Directed by	Original release date
0	0	"Prologue"; Transliteration: "Purorōgu" (Japanese: プロローグ)	Yoshitomo Yonetani	October 10, 1989
A company man is drinking in the Demon's Nest bar and complains about his unhappy life and work at home. The traveling salesman Moguro Fukuzou introduces himself and offers to "fill your empty soul". Moguro offers an opportunity for the man to abandon his current lifestyle and enter another world by using a key to pass through a special door. He refuses, but Moguro is sure that he will return later and take the key.
1	1	"A Face You Can Depend On"; Transliteration: "Tanomoshii kao" (Japanese: たのもしい顔)	Sōichirō Zen	October 17, 1989
Tanomo Yuusuke is a handsome company manager who crumbles under the pressure of the expectations of those around him and seeks comfort in the bosom of a Buddha-like woman.
2	2	"Easy Driver"; Transliteration: "Ījī doraibā" (Japanese: イージー・ドライバー)	Sōichirō Zen	October 24, 1989
Company man Uranari Heiichi takes driving lessons but he is a terrible driver. Moguro gives Uranari private lessons, letting him drive however Moguro likes and enjoys the joke when Uranari causes a huge amount of damage.
3	3	"The Friend Salesman"; Transliteration: "Tomodachi-ya" (Japanese: ともだち屋)	Kazuya Miyazaki	October 31, 1989
Moguro sets up Aoi Tatsuo, an unpopular and lonely salesman with a lady by correspondence. When they meet in a park at night frequented by perverts, she turns out to be a mannequin whom Moguro causes to scream for help. Aoi is then beaten up by citizens and arrested.
4	4	"The Man Who Transformed"; Transliteration: "Baketa otoko" (Japanese: 化けた男)	Sōichirō Zen	November 7, 1989
Isobe Kinichi is a company man who has a mundane life with a wife and child and wishes for some adventure. Moguro encourages him to wear a disguise and have nights out on the town, but then gives him a new life, in a small apartment with a wife and four children.
5	5	"The View from the 47th Floor"; Transliteration: "47-kai kara no nagame" (Japanese: 47階からの眺め)	Sōichirō Zen	November 21, 1989
Moguro encourages student, Uki Mamoru, to observe life from the top of a building and he falls in love with a woman he sees in an apartment building. Moguro sets up a meeting between them, but he also tells her husband the gang boss who arrives and beats up Uki.
6	6	"In Valor There is Waste"; Transliteration: "Yūki wa sonki" (Japanese: 勇気は損気)	Sōichirō Zen	November 28, 1989
A cowardly illustrator, Kumai Isamu, dreams of being a hero so Moguro encourages him to be brave while wearing a very flamboyant outfit. The young cartoonist eventually summons enough courage to stop a robber, but is stabbed in his right arm, preventing him from ever drawing again.
7	7	"Sloth"; Transliteration: "Namakemono" (Japanese: ナマケモノ)	Yoshihide Kuriyama	December 5, 1989
A slothful salesman, Saho Tamio, is very unsuccessful so Moguro offers to help. Moguro sells many properties on his behalf but he must pray to a special magical sloth statue Moguro gave him. However he keeps the deposits which causes his boss to charge Saho with embezzlement. Moguro then condemns the salesman to have a breakdown and really behave like a sloth.
8	8	"The Separator"; Transliteration: "Tegire-ya" (Japanese: 手切れ屋)	Kazuya Miyazaki	December 12, 1989
A young celebrity, Bouda Shinichi, does not want to marry his girlfriend Senko, so Moguro says he will convince her to stay away, but he must never see her again. However Bouda misses Senko and sees her again so Moguro joins them together permanently.
9	9	"The Woman on the Platform"; Transliteration: "Purattohōmu no on'na" (Japanese: プラットホームの女)	Sōichirō Zen	December 19, 1989
A dull young bank employee, Naoki Junichi, falls in love with a woman wearing a medical face mask he sees every day on the train. Moguro arranges a meeting, but demands that Naoki does not love her only for her looks. The banker agrees, but then is horrified when she reveals her true disfigured face that is the result of failed plastic surgery.
10	10	"The Sure Winner"; Transliteration: "Tekichū-ya" (Japanese: 的中屋)	Yoshihide Kuriyama	December 26, 1989
Student Nakayama Buichi bets away his allowance at the horse races. After helping Nakayama win once, Moguro offers to help him one more time, as long as he never bets again. Later, after bragging about his win, Nakayama is forced to accept ten million yen from a gangster in a bar to bet at the races. However, before he meets Moguro on the next race day to place the bet, Nakayama gambles all the money and loses.
11	11	"Closet Man"; Transliteration: "Oshiire otoko" (Japanese: 押入れ男)	Yoshikata Nitta	January 9, 1990
Struggling manga writer Hikage Hisatoshi is having trouble creating and paying his rent. Moguro offers to move in to his apartment as long as Hikage stays in the new closet. Hikage is so happy in the closet that he creates very popular and successful manga. Moguro then moves him to an all purpose-built closet that has everything he needs. Eventually, Hikage wants to leave and enjoy his success but finds that he can no longer live in the sunlight as he had developed heliophobia, breaking Moguro's rule. Moguro condemns Hikage to live under his desk for rest of his life.
12	12	"Daydream"; Transliteration: "Hakuchūmu" (Japanese: 白昼夢)	Sōichirō Zen	January 16, 1990
Company man Nakajima Kenichi always eats last night's leftovers for lunch. Moguro treats him to and exotic lunch at the Daydream Club in the basement. Nakajima enjoys it so much he and a workmate spend all afternoon the next day drinking there, but they return to work after 5 pm and are both fired.
SP 1 (13)	SP–1	"Pitfalls of Blackmail"; Transliteration: "Yusuri no otoshiana" (Japanese: ユスリの落とし穴)	Yoshitomo Yonetani	January 23, 1990
Workaholic Tsutomu Erito works at the prestigious Elite Company but is jealous of womanizing co-worker Asobita. Asobita has been granted leave to study abroad but Erito believes it is because he has proposed to the boss' daughter. Moguro gives Erito a listening device to record Asobita's phone conversations, and he gathers evidence that Asobita is having an affair with the Boss' mistress. Moguro uses the evidence to blackmail Asobita into withdrawing from studying abroad. Later, a schoolgirl from the classy Shiroyuki Academy is pursued by two men and takes refuge in the Demon's Nest Bar but Moguro saves her. Later, Erito catches the same girl shoplifting and blackmails her into going to a hotel with him. Moguro sees him and saves the girl and then he demands money from Erito which he gives to the girl. However, she then begins to extort more money from Erito and reveals that she is known as Razorblade Orei, a gang leader at Shiroyuki. Erito realizes in despair he is now in the pits of a protection racket.
14	13	"Golf 101"; Transliteration: "Gorufu nyūmon" (Japanese: ゴルフ入門)	Shinichi Watanabe	January 30, 1990
Unconfident company man Maido Chiyorou feels left out at work, so he tries to learn golf after hours. He improves after lessons from Moguro where he learns to imagine the ball as someone he hates. Later, Maido joins in the work golf competition but under pressure he hits the co-worker he hates instead of the ball.
15	14	"The Woman Who Wants to Marry"; Transliteration: "Kekkon shitai onna" (Japanese: 結婚したい女)	Yoshikata Nitta	February 6, 1990
The ambitious woman office-worker, Tsumanari Taiko, is only interested in tall, educated, wealthy men to the exclusion of all others. Moguro sends her on an island trip for singles where she meets and falls for a man who fits her criteria, however he is a fake and Tsumanari is horrified when she finds out.
16	15	"Cutting"; Transliteration: "Kiru" (Japanese: 切る)	Sōichirō Zen	February 13, 1990
Trainee hairdresser Debuno Fuuta is too scared to hold a razor, so Moguro gives him a box of medicated cigarettes to increase his confidence. Debuno improves his shaving skills, but is distraught when the other hairdressers smoke them all during a mahjong night, not realizing that only the first cigarette was medicated. When called on to shave his colleague, he makes a fatal slip.
17	16	"Mr. Pervert"; Transliteration: "Chikan-san" (Japanese: チ漢さん)	Kazuya Miyazaki	February 20, 1990
Fuyuki Hanae, a grumpy and conservative old man is encouraged by Moguro to be a pervert.
18	17	"Part-Time Confidential"; Transliteration: "Arubaito (hi) jōhō" (Japanese: アルバイト(秘)情報)	Shinichi Watanabe	February 27, 1990
College student Tsutsui Shinichi is offered high-paying part-time jobs by Moguro and takes one offered by an old man to go out and have a good time on his behalf, as long as the money is not spent on something pointless. Unfortunately Tsutsui loses a fortune to some thugs at a mahjong club and when he goes back to the old man's house with the thugs to get more money, they find that he's gone.
19	18	"After the Dream"; Transliteration: "Yume no ato" (Japanese: 夢のあと)	Yoshikata Nitta	March 6, 1990
Urashima Taichi, a middle-aged company man has a dream of to stay in a deluxe hotel at least once. Moguro convinces him to try it, and tricks him into going with a young woman who he thinks is his wife. When he finally leaves and goes home, he finds that a long time has passed, and someone else has been living in his house for the past 10 years. The story is based on the legend of Urishima Tarō.
20	19	"The Guardsman"; Transliteration: "Za gādoman" (Japanese: ザ・ガードマン)	Shinichi Watanabe	March 13, 1990
Company man Ishino Takashi calculates how much he has lost playing mahjong and decided to quit. Moguro offers to protect him from ever playing again, but Ishino relapses and Moguro finds him playing mahjong again. The next night when Ishino comes home, he finds Moguro has turned his wife into a mahjong addict.
21	20	"Her First Love"; Transliteration: "Hatsukoi no hito" (Japanese: 初恋の人)	Yūichi Shinpo	March 20, 1990
Housewife Koino Yumemi regrets not marrying a potter in her youth and complains about her neglectful husband and disobedient daughter. Moguro reunites Koino with the potter and they run away to live together, however their new life together is not as idyllic as they imagined.
SP 2 (22, 23)	Sp–2	"Out of Bounds Spouses: The Husband's Case / The Wife's Case"; Transliteration: "OB Fūfu -otto no kēsu- / OB fūfu -tsuma no kēsu-" (Japanese: OB夫婦-夫のケース- / OB夫婦-妻のケース-)	Yoshikata Nitta; Sōichirō Zen	March 27, 1990
(1) A married company worker, Mushimi Ichirou, has a dull existence and his wife is often out in the evenings. Moguro encourages him to take up golf, and gives him a valuable classic golf club, but make him promise not to obtain any other classic clubs. However the man becomes obsessed and buys other clubs, eventually breaking into a golf store to steal one and is caught. (2) Mushimi Chouko, Ichirou's wife, takes up golf and Moguro promises to find her a coach to improve her game. The coach, Hiyodori Shinako, is a young attractive woman who greatly improves her game such that spends more time golfing. However, Moguro warns her not to neglect her wifely duties. When her husband is sick, she decides to play golf instead of staying home, but feels guilty and plays badly so Shinako dumps her. When she arrives home, she finds her husband has left.
24	21	"The Path to Karate"; Transliteration: "Karatedō" (Japanese: 空手道)	Shinichi Watanabe	April 10, 1990
Moguro saves the young company man, Karasumori Kiichi, from being beaten by thugs and convinces him to learn karate every day with a tough master. Karasumori finds it difficult but perseveres for a few lessons. When he meets the same thugs in an alley, he tries to fight them, but is badly beaten up.
25	22	"The Man-Hater"; Transliteration: "Otoko-girai" (Japanese: 男ぎらい)	Yoshikata Nitta	April 17, 1990
A career woman, Kariya Asako, is harassed by her boss and Moguro arranges for him to be fired for sexual harassment on a train. In return, Kariya must focus on her work and not become involved with a man, but she does. When Kariya's new boyfriend surprises her on a railway platform, she overreacts and accidentally pushes him in front of a train.
26	23	"House Lights"; Transliteration: "Ie no hi" (Japanese: 家の灯)	Sōichirō Zen	April 24, 1990
Middle-aged company man, Kaeri Takunai, has an unhappy home life, so spends his evenings aimlessly killing time. Moguro offers him an apartment as long as invites no women there, however he lets a female neighbour in, and so breaks his promise. Kaeri's family finds out and he is thrown out, but then is also prevented from entering the new apartment. Eventually he is back home, in the doghouse.
27	24	"The Man in the Back Seat"; Transliteration: "Kōbu zaseki no otoko" (Japanese: 後部座席の男)	Shinichi Watanabe	May 1, 1990
Moguro convinces a company driver, Ohkuri Yukumi, to give him stock tips so that he can buy shares and split the profits on the condition that the driver must not trade himself. However Ohkuri gets a hot tip, and uses company money to buy shares himself, but is then arrested for fraud and embezzlement.
28	25	"Lady Killer Warning"; Transliteration: "Motemote gochūi" (Japanese: モテモテご注意)	Sōichirō Zen	May 8, 1990
Office worker Musai Toshio leads a dull life and women ignore him, so Moguro gives him a makeover but Moguro makes him promise to be prudent in his relationships with women. Musai finally dates a woman at work, but then takes another woman out to lunch. Moguro then calls Musai's girlfriend who turns up at the restaurant and makes a scene.
29	26	"Belly of the Tanuki"; Transliteration: "Tanuki no onaka" (Japanese: 狸のオナカ)	Yoshitomo Yonetani	May 15, 1990
The handsome actor, Debara Nayami, must lose his pot belly to appear in a play beside a beautiful co-star. Moguro gives Debara a tanuki ornament to pray to if he feels tempted by sweets. The technique works and Debara becomes trim again while the tanuki becomes fatter. However, on opening night Debara receives a box of his favourite daifuku and eats them, causing his fat belly to reappear while he is on stage.
30	27	"The Executive and the Window"; Transliteration: "Jūyaku to madogiwa" (Japanese: 重役と窓際)	Yoshikata Nitta	May 22, 1990
Overworked company executive, Higama Hoshiya, is envious of Madobe, a company man in the adjacent building who has no work to do because he is approaching retirement. Moguro arranges for them to exchange places, but warns Higama that he must not do any work. Unfortunately, Higama travels to Kyushu on a business and pleasure trip and when he returns he finds that Madobe has died while in his job. Higama is thus seen as an impostor and is condemned to spend the rest of his working life in Madobe's job.
31	28	"The May Blues"; Transliteration: "Satsukibyō" (Japanese: 五月病)	Sōichirō Zen	May 29, 1990
Katsuta Rui, a young company man who still lives with his mother, has lost interest in his job because of his demanding boss named Oniyama. Moguro suggests that he practice knitting during lunch breaks and discovers that Oniyama also knits which makes his life easier, but Oniyama warns him to keep it a secret. However, Katsuta's mother finds out and exposes Oniyama who has to resign and he begins teaching knitting assisted by Katsuta, much to his mother's horror.
32	29	"Message Dialing"; Transliteration: "Dengon daiyaru" (Japanese: 伝言ダイヤル)	Shinichi Watanabe	June 5, 1990
Young company employee Ikuji Naiya is extremely shy and lonely, and spends his spare time and money using a phone message service. Moguro gives him the message phone number of a lonely young woman and they happily exchange messages. Moguro tells Naiya that he must never contact her in person, but Naiya succumbs and arranges to meet her, only to find that she's a little girl.
33	30	"The Single Life"; Transliteration: "Shinguru raifu" (Japanese: シングルライフ)	Shinichi Watanabe	June 12, 1990
Otokoya Moume is a divorced company worker who lives alone and his apartment is a mess. Moguro offers him a free housekeeper, Shigeko, who has a young daughter, but he prefers living alone and sacks her. However, he then misses her housekeeping and her cooking. He asks Moguro to bring her back, but Otokoya must promise not become romantically involved with her. However, Otokoya proposes marriage, only to find that Shigeko has reconciled with her burly husband and Otokoya's ex-wife has left their small children at his doorstep. They all then move into his small apartment with him.
34	31	"Early Stopover"; Transliteration: "Tochūgesha" (Japanese: 途中下車)	Shinichi Watanabe	June 19, 1990
Married company man Hande Oshita is enticed by a woman sitting above a bar he sees from the train each evening. One night, Moguro convinces Hande to leave the train and meet her. He enters the bar but he is drugged and then presented with a huge bill. Moguro bails him out, but when Hande catches a taxi home, he finds his house has gone, leaving him stranded.
35	32	"Kissing Fortune"; Transliteration: "Kissu uranai" (Japanese: キッス占い)	Yoshikata Nitta	June 26, 1990
Osaki Makkura is a college preparatory student who wants to enter Tokyo University. Moguro takes him to a kissing fortune teller who predicts he will be successful if he studies hard, however he is not allowed to kiss anyone else before the exams. Unfortunately, his girlfriend kisses him and Moguro tells him that he will never go to Tokyo University and even his girlfriend rejects him.
36	33	"Refusal of Service"; Transliteration: "Jōsha kyohi" (Japanese: 乗車拒否)	Sōichirō Zen	July 3, 1990
Taxi driver Ooi Takushi does poorly because he seems to only pick up short fares and he is too meek to refuse the client. Moguro gives Ooi a paper tiger which he says will bring long fares, but he must never refuse to pick up a passenger. Ooi begins making more money, but on night he refuses to take a woman a short distance to hospital. Moguo causes him to have an accident, and then no taxis stop to pick up the injured Ooi.
37	34	"Bullpen Ace"; Transliteration: "Burupen ēsu" (Japanese: ブルペンエース)	Shinichi Watanabe	July 10, 1990
Baseball pitcher Nomino plays well at practice in the bullpen but plays badly in the real games. Moguro gives Nomino a cap to wear but he must also abstain from drinking alcohol until he is pitching in the major league. Nomino improves his pitching, but he cannot sleep on the night before a big game, and resorts to drinking sake. The next morning he is hung over and rushes to the game without his lucky cap and ruins his chance to play in the major league.
SP–3	SP–3	"The Laughing Salesman Encyclopedia"; Transliteration: "Warau seerusuman daizukan" (Japanese: 笑ゥせぇるすまん大図鑑)	N/A	July 17, 1990
Series recap.
38	35	"Wife Photo"; Transliteration: "Aisai shashin" (Japanese: 愛妻写真)	Sōichirō Zen	July 24, 1990
Photo lab worker Kako Shinobu shows around a photo of his attractive young wife and son, but the photo is quite old and his home life is unhappy. Moguro lures him back to his old apartment where he meets his wife and son as they were 15 years ago and he is finally happy.
39	36	"Collector"; Transliteration: "Korekutā" (Japanese: コレクター)	Shinichi Watanabe	July 31, 1990
Company man Kichide Maniya is an addicted stamp collector and Moguro offers him an extremely rare Hawaiian 2 cents stamp in exchange for his entire collection. Kichide is happy to hand over his collection to overcome his addiction, but Moguro says he must never sell the stamp. Later, Kichide's mother reveals that she owes millions of Yen after playing the stock market, so he tries to sell the stamp but is killed by a front-end loader as he rushes across the road.
40	37	"Queen of the Night"; Transliteration: "Gekkabijin" (Japanese: 月下美人)	Tetsushi Takayanagi	August 7, 1990
Freeter Ubuna Yatsuda has a crush on Megumi, a girl working in a flower shop, but he is too shy to speak to her. Moguro offers Ubuna a Queen of the Night flower to woo Megumi. She accepts, and As Ubuna and Megumi wait for the flower to bloom during the night, Megumi's boyfriend arrives home and pushes Ubuna over the balcony and into a pond.
41	38	"Pet-in-a-Can"; Transliteration: "Kanzume no petto" (Japanese: カンヅメのペット)	Sōichirō Zen	August 14, 1990
Young animator Koh Arao has a pet myna bird in his apartment against the building's rules. Tachiki from next door notifies the landlord and the bird is allowed to escape. As compensation, Moguro gives Arao a eucalyptus tree in a can and promises that if Arao talks to it, it will bring him happiness. Arao finds the tree fascinating and it prompts him to create a successful pitch for an animated series about a koala and a eucalyptus tree. However, Tachiki discovers the tree and cuts it to pieces. Moguro then regenerates the tree whose branches grow and deposit Tachiki on top of a telegraph pole.
42	39	"Owl Eyes"; Transliteration: "Fukurō no me" (Japanese: フクロウの目)	Shinichi Watanabe	August 21, 1990
Mimizu Kunio is a photographer obsessed with owls, but Moguro suggests that he photograph "night owls" in the city to support his family and fund his hobby. Mimizu becomes financially successful, but is still obsessed with owls so Moguro turns him into an owl.
43	40	"Youthful Pride"; Transliteration: "Wakasa jiman" (Japanese: 若さ自慢)	Yoshitomo Yonetani	August 28, 1990
The youthful looking and married company manager Wakasa Manjirou is concerned that he is beginning to look his age. Moguro give him a Rudolph Valentino doll and tells him to wish upon it for youth, and it proves successful. Later, Moguro warns Wakasa not to overdo it, however after meeting a beautiful woman, Wakasa overexerts himself and dies on the dance floor.
44	41	"Gourmand in Waiting"; Transliteration: "Gurume shigan" (Japanese: グルメ志願)	Hiroshi Matsuzono	September 4, 1990
Struggling company man Kurume Hoshio is saving for his wedding, but he yearns to eat at three star restaurants. Moguro treats him to dinner at a high-class restaurant, then offers him a membership card but warns that it should be used in moderation. However, Kurume becomes addicted to the point he becomes obsessed so Moguro condemns him to enjoy eating garbage.
45	42	"Karaoke Addict"; Transliteration: "Karaoke-shō kanja" (Japanese: カラオケ症患者)	Shinichi Watanabe	September 11, 1990
Karao Keiichi company man dislikes karaoke nights, but Moguro gives him a karaoke set to practice at home and he becomes a convert. At an important business dinner, he embarrasses the client with his good singing, ruining the business deal. Then refuses to return to work and continues singing at home to the point his voice became hoarse.
46	43	"Relocated Husband"; Transliteration: "Tanshinfunin" (Japanese: 単身赴任)	Sōichirō Zen	September 18, 1990
Company man Tanami Kazuhito is relocated to a remote branch office but he misses his wife and home back in Tokyo. Moguro takes him to a friendly bar with the charming young hostess Tsuyu and he begins to frequent the establishment. Moguro encourages Tanami's friendship with the lonely Tsuyu and end up spending a night together. However, the next morning Tanami wife visits his hotel and discovers his transgression.
47	44	"Moonlit Orchid"; Transliteration: "Tsukiyo no ōkiddo" (Japanese: 月夜のオーキッド)	Yoshitomo Yonetani	September 25, 1990
Company man Hanahata Komatta always delays returning home because his unhappy home life. Moguro gives him a potted orchid to care for. However his wife becomes jealous and cuts off the blossoming flowers and serves them in tempura which devastates Hanahata. As compensation, Moguro makes an orchid flower bloom from Hanahata's mouth in the moonlight.

== Season 2 ==
No. overall	No. in series	Title	Directed by	Original release date
SP 5 (48)	SP–5	"Snow Mountain Devil Song"; Transliteration: "Setsuzan sanka" (Japanese: 雪山惨歌)	Yoshitomo Yonetani	January 22, 1991
Kokeru Mijime, a young manga artist who writes about based on his own life as a pathetic loser, is under pressure from his editor to submit his work before he goes on a skiing school. However, Mijime leaves the unfinished draft for the editor to catch the bus to the ski fields. Moguro appears and distracts the editor and then gives Mijime a replacement ticket for another tour. Mijime is captivated by two beautiful young women on the tour, Yuko and Atsuko, and accepts a wager with three other men that he will hook up with Yuko or pay their tab if he fails. When it appears that Mijime will lose the bet, Moguro gives him special ski equipment to improve his ability. The equipment works and Mijime impresses Yuko, who invites him to her cabin, but it turns out to be a practical joke leaving Mijime devastated.
SP 6 (49)	Sp–6	"Hot Spring Requiem"; Transliteration: "Yukemuri aika" (Japanese: 湯けむり哀歌)	Yoshitomo Yonetani	March 12, 1991
Salaryman Rei Ochikubo is charged with organizing his class reunion at a hot springs retreat, and is pressured into inviting two young women guests to join them. Meanwhile, other former students such as Mr. Fuyuki, Tanomo Yuusuke, Tanami Kazuhito, Kako Shinobu, Kaeri Takunai, Hanahata Komatta, Mushimi Ichirou, Tanami Kazuhito and Higama Hoshiya relate their individual experiences with Moguro and his particular brand of salesmanship which have been presented in other episodes of the series. Ochikubo sees the girls, Yuko Miyajiri and Atsuko Kurokawa bathing in the hot spring, but is too shy to approach them so Moguro grants him the confidence he lacks. He appears to charm them, but they pull a prank and trick him into jumping into a frozen pond. Moguro promises to make things right, but plies Ochikubo with so much sake that he happily spends the night with two maneki-neko figurines.
50	45	"Kefir"; Transliteration: "Kēfia" (Japanese: ケーフィア)	Sōichirō Zen	March 19, 1991
Scriptwriter, Nashiya Sutami, is addicted to energy drinks and Moguro offers him Kefir instead, but he must care for the culture and keep it alive. Sutami's health improves, but he develops a writer's block. He blames the kefir and destroys it. Before he can apologize, the kefir consumes him.
51	46	"Man Who Looks Down"; Transliteration: "Miorosu otoko" (Japanese: 見おろす男)	Sōichirō Zen	April 9, 1991
Kazuo Uwame is a middle-aged company man who is always apologizing for his behavior. Moguro takes him to the top of a skyscraper to live for a week so he can look down on everyone else instead of always looking up at others. His attitude changes and he gains more respect at work, however when he returns home, his domineering wife beats him back into the submissive man he was before.
52	47	"Golf Freak"; Transliteration: "Gorufu furīku" (Japanese: ゴルフフリーク)	Yūichi Shinpo	April 16, 1991
Company man Kyouichi Shiratama is obsessed by golf, but he is a terrible player. Moguro offers to make him a super golfer, and gives him a magic golf club, but he must not let anyone else use it. However, after Shiratama's boss insists on using it, Shiratama's next ball hits a gangster in the head and his associates take their revenge on the unlucky Shiratama.
53	48	"Old Face, Young Body"; Transliteration: "Rōgan wakakarada" (Japanese: 老顔若体)	Sōichirō Zen	April 23, 1991
Company President, Izumo Wakashi is 73 years old and feels his age, but he looks much younger. Moguro gives him a special dumbbell for training which he must use with a special incantation 13 times morning and night to recover his youthful strength. However, it only works if he sticks to golf and does not pursue women. Wakashi ignores the warning and spends the night with a young woman, which does not effect his muscular body, but causes his face to decay rapidly into that of an old man.
54	49	"The Chair-Man"; Transliteration: "Isu otoko" (Japanese: 椅子男)	Yūichi Shinpo	April 30, 1991
Printer Anraku Kazuhisa often works late and sleeps on uncomfortable office chairs at work. Moguro offers him a large comfortable bed above the Demon's Nest Bar and he takes the bed home for his family. However, his family all sleep in the bed so he goes back to the factory to sleep and Moguro turns him into an armchair.
55	50	"Decision Stick"; Transliteration: "Ketsudan sutekki" (Japanese: 決断ステッキ)	Sōichirō Zen	May 7, 1991
Mayoi Oushi, a 25 year-old company man has difficulty making decisions and exasperates his co-workers. Moguro gives him a "decision stick" with an arrow head to help him make decisions, but he must always follow the stick's decision. Things go well when he follows the stick, however when he goes against its decision, the next time he throws the stick into the air, it kills him when it falls.
56	51	"Hot Spring Eccentricity"; Transliteration: "Onsen kikō" (Japanese: 温泉奇行)	Yūichi Shinpo	May 14, 1991
Company man Kibara Shisao decides to take a side trip on his way home from a business trip, and Moguro takes him to a Mystery Onsen. They spend the night drinking with geishas, but to Kibara they look like his wife except a beautiful young woman named Chi. Moguro arranges for Kibara to spend the night with her, but in the morning he awakes with a geisha who looks like his wife and an expensive bill.
57	52	"Security Capsule"; Transliteration: "Anshin kapuseru" (Japanese: 安心カプセル)	Sōichirō Zen	May 21, 1991
Company man Heiichi Uranari (from episode 2) feels more comfortable living in his old car than staying at home, but the car breaks down so Moguro takes him to a capsule hotel. Uranari sleeps badly because of hearing others snoring, so Moguro takes him to another hotel with security capsules that seals out the outside world. Uranari sleeps so well, that when he emerges he finds a post-apocalyptic world where he is the only survivor.
58	53	"Pride in My Work"; Transliteration: "Jigajisan" (Japanese: 自画自賛)	Yūichi Shinpo	May 28, 1991
Ban Moriyasu is a struggling artist and Moguro takes him to the wealthy Mr Narugane who commissions him to paint a van Gogh replica for his office. Narugane then sponsors Moriyasu to paint, but Moguro warns Ban that he must not lose his artistic integrity. However, Ban reluctantly agrees to copy a Gauguin painting rather than lose his sponsorship and Moguro condemns him to be like van Gogh. Ban severs his ear and spends the rest of his life painting self-portraits.
59	54	"Home Vegetable Garden"; Transliteration: "Kateisaien" (Japanese: 家庭菜園)	Sōichirō Zen	June 4, 1991
Company man Deri Keita is extremely fussy and always brings his tea and food from home. He is asked out for a business dinner but he finds the food inedible and drinks too much. Moguro offers Deri a device which will detect if food contains harmful substances and sends him fresh organic food which soothes his conscience. However, Deri becomes suspicious of the quality and Moguro condemns him to survive alone by turning his apartment into an organic farm.
60	55	"Mean Drunk"; Transliteration: "Karami-zake" (Japanese: からみ酒)	Yūichi Shinpo	June 11, 1991
Company man Yotte Sourou is meek and incompetent, but after drinking alcohol he becomes loud and obnoxious. Moguro shows Yotte video footage of his behavior and Yotte vows to give up alcohol. Moguro does not trust him, and gives him a bag into which Yotte can vent his pent up rage. The arrangement works fine until he arrives home late one night. An angry drunk accosts Yotte and pulls open the bag to receive a tirade of abuse. Insulted, the drunk pushes Yotte down a flight of steps and he ends up in hospital.
61	56	"Paradise Bath"; Transliteration: "Gokuraku furo" (Japanese: 極楽風呂)	Sōichirō Zen	June 18, 1991
Yuami Yoshio is a waterworks agent who enjoys bath houses and Moguro promises to take him to one of his favorite ones, the Edo style ukiyo Paradise bath house. Moguro gives Yuami a free entry pass, but warns Yuami that he will be banned if he takes any modern devices inside. One day Yuami takes in his pager and Moguro gives him the choice of never going again or never leaving. Yuami chooses never to leave and he becomes an attendant in Paradise.
62	57	"Rental Girlfriend"; Transliteration: "Rentaru kanojo" (Japanese: レンタル彼女)	Yūichi Shinpo	June 25, 1991
TV production staff member, Tsunei Kazuto, is invited to a function with the other crew members and must bring a girlfriend, but he doesn't have one. Tsunei asks Moguro to find him a partner for the night and he agrees, although Tsunei must not fall in love with her. On the night, Eri, a beautiful woman in a sports car picks him up and takes him to the dinner, making his colleagues jealous. Tsunei pleads with Moguro for a chance to see Eri again, but this time she arrives with her pushy manager who demands money for the service.
63	58	"Memory Bar"; Transliteration: "Omoide sakaba" (Japanese: 想い出酒場)	Sōichirō Zen	July 2, 1991
Ageing company man, Kaikou Sumitarou, longs for his younger days out at night before bars became dominated by noisy karaoke. Moguro takes him to the Taishō era Akaneko bar where he meets the beautiful hostess Etsuko. Kaikou becomes a regular, but Moguro warns him not to fall in love as the bar is for nostalgia visits only and there will be dire consequences if he continues to flirt with Etsuko. Unfortunately, Kaikou falls for Etsuko and when he visits again, he discovers that the bar is a ruin after being abandoned for decades, and the Etsuko who greets him is undead.
64	59	"My Wife's Lunch"; Transliteration: "Aisaibentō" (Japanese: 愛妻弁当)	Sōichirō Zen	July 9, 1991
Wagatsuma Tsuyoshi's wife Hanako always prepares lunch for him. Although her cooking is inedible, he does not have the courage to tell her and instead, he always eats sandwiches bought from a store. Moguro offers to provide a delicious lunch in exchange for Wagatsuma's at a jizo statue each day. The arrangement is successful, but Wagatsuma is not allowed to know who eats Hanako's lunches. One day, Wagatsuma sees that it is a homeless man who eats the lunches which breaks the deal. When Tsuyoshi returns home he finds the homeless man in his place, being fed by Hanako.
65	60	"Divorce Club"; Transliteration: "Rikon kurabu" (Japanese: 離婚倶楽部)	Yūichi Shinpo	July 16, 1991
Bon Fukumizu is a hotel banquet host, but has a lifeless and miserable married life himself, living with his wealthy wife and her mother. Moguro offers to help him with a divorce, and introduce him to a divorce club where he must choose someone regardless of looks or wealth. The club is on a cruise ship and he meets a beautiful woman and they marry, even though his wife is a cross-dressing man.
66	61	"Dream My Home"; Transliteration: "Yume no maihōmu" (Japanese: 夢のマイホーム)	Sōichirō Zen	July 23, 1991
Moguro offers to help Ikko Tateo find his dream home, but finding something suitable within his price range proves impossible. Eventually he finds the perfect home for Ikko's family, a free concept home which is modern, spacious, close to transport and the sea. The only drawback is that it is built out from the side of a cliff.
67	62	"Love's Parting Gifts"; Transliteration: "Ai no okurimono" (Japanese: 愛の贈りもの)	Yūichi Shinpo	July 30, 1991
Moguro catches up with married travelling salesman Uwaki Shirou who, three years earlier, met and became infatuated with the attractive Ubuna Yoshiko. Moguro reminds Uwaki that he helped him woo Yoshiko, but Uwaki was supposed to reveal that he was already married. instead, Uwaki deserted Yoshiko and now as his punishment, Uwaki discovers that Yoshiko has moved in next door to his family, and she has a baby.
68	63	"The Ideal Family"; Transliteration: "Kazoku awase" (Japanese: 家族あわせ)	Sōichirō Zen	August 6, 1991
Moguro meets company worker Yanai Samushi who is unhappy at home with his wife and son and he suggests that Yanai change families. Initially Yanai refuses, but after another fight at home, he agrees. Yanai finds himself outside another house with his name, and is welcomed home by a woman and daughter he met previously at a blood bank. Yanai's wife and son begin to miss him, so Moguro takes them to his other home where they find him being sucked dry by a vampire mother and daughter.
69	64	"Love Across the Glass"; Transliteration: "Garasugoshi no ai" (Japanese: ガラス越しの愛)	Yūichi Shinpo	August 13, 1991
Computer programmer Kouda Kametarou is obsessed by turtles and Moguro offers him a chance to swim with his favorite sea turtle Kamejirou at the local aquarium. Moguro releases Kamejirou but Kouda takes it home against Moguro's instructions, so Moguro turns Kouda into a turtle.
70	65	"Barhopper"; Transliteration: "Hashigozake" (Japanese: はしご酒)	Sōichirō Zen	August 20, 1991
Novelist Koshiba Shousuke is an inveterate bar-hopper, but he has trouble meeting his deadlines. After a night on the town, Moguro introduces Koshiba to his attractive drinking partner Sakai Nomiko, but warns Koshiba that he must not make a pass at Nomiko. They agree on a bar-hopping expedition along the Yamanote circle, and Nomiko outlasts Koshiba who ends up a drunken wreck. In his stupor, Koshiba ends up molesting Nomiko who gets angry and abandons him. He then passes out on the road amongst a few homeless drunks and misses his last train.
71	66	"Long-Term Break"; Transliteration: "Chōkikyūka" (Japanese: 長期休暇)	Sōichirō Zen	August 27, 1991
Mature company man Nagai Yasumi is forced to take four weeks vacation, but has no idea what to do with his time so he rides trains and sits in parks during the day. Moguro offers to help by introducing him to volunteering, however Nagai must expect nothing in return or become personally involved with the people he helps. He helps with the rehabilitation of a young woman which he enjoys, but he becomes attracted to her. When Nagai returns to the apartment, instead of the young woman, he finds an aged version of himself needing home care.
SP 7 (72)	Sp–7	"Wanio's Bizzare Cuisine"; Transliteration: "Wanio no kaiki ryōri" (Japanese: ワニオの怪奇料理)	Naoyuki Kuzuya	September 3, 1991
Elementary schoolboy and son of a restaurant owner, Ageru Kikata, is bullied by fellow student Gorita Gorio because he has goldfish instead of a real pet. Moguro offers to provide a pet acceptable to a restaurant owning family, a small alligator. He convinces Ageru's father to keep it and Ageru names it Wanio. One day, while walking Wanio, Ageru encounters Gorita and Wanio scares off his fierce bulldog, Brassy. Gorita's father angrily demands Wanio in return for Brassy which has become too frightened to be an effective guard dog. When Mr. Gori's younger, but much larger adventurer brother Hihio arrives in town, he decides to eat Wanio. Mr. Gori pressures Mr. Kikata into killing and preparing it, however Moguro takes control of Wanio which kills and eats Hihio, then Moguro returns it to Ageru.
73	67	"House Lady"; Transliteration: "Hausu redi" (Japanese: ハウスレディ)	Shinichi Watanabe	September 10, 1991
Wagama Machiko is a fashion designer, but never has time to tidy her apartment, so she is reluctant to let her boyfriend Bonchi see the mess. One evening when Bonchi arrives to pick her up, Moguro has the apartment tidied beforehand by the housekeeper Catherine Baker then tells Machiko she will be happy as long as she values Catherine's worth and mustn't fire her for anything trivial and petty. Catherine proves invaluable for not only she keeps her apartment clean but gives her fashion ideas that bolster her career, but Machiko thinks Bonchi finds her attractive so Machiko fires Catherine out of petty jealousy. However, Bonchi realizes that it was Catherine who cooked and cleaned so he dumps the messy Machiko and marries Catherine.
74	68	"Sleep Pillow"; Transliteration: "Anmin makura" (Japanese: 安眠まくら)	Sōichirō Zen	September 17, 1991
Muneri Kiyoshi is a company man supervisor who has trouble getting a good night's sleep. Moguro gives him a small electronic pillow to attach to his neck which will allow him to sleep while appearing to be awake. However, Muneri must remove the device when a buzzer sounds to avoid overuse, but he ignores the buzzer and it overloads during a business meeting. He then finds his inability to sleep ideal for his new position, as night watchman.
75	69	"The Mystery Star"; Transliteration: "Maboroshi no sutā" (Japanese: 幻のスタア)	Shinichi Watanabe	September 24, 1991
Moguro restores Katte Ryouzou, the former film actor known as Hoshi Shinzaburou back to stardom on the condition he must keep his real identity a secret. But when another actor emerges claiming that he is the former actor, this causes Katte with immense anger and jealousy to revealing his secret to the public breaking his promise with Moguro. They both appear on TV for the audience to identify the real star by having the original director of the film that Katte starred in to point out the who the real Hoshi is but Katte loses and Moguro sentences him to acting out his role in his retirement village.
76	70	"Germaphobia"; Transliteration: "Kurīn shōkōgun" (Japanese: クリーン症候群)	Sōichirō Zen	October 8, 1991
Young female office worker Seike Tsuzuki is health conscious and obsessed with cleanliness. Moguro offers to help her find a boyfriend and she encounters an unpolished, capricious man. She is attracted to him, but Moguro warns her that the relationship may become physical. When her boyfriend tries to kiss her, she is revolted and pushes him away, and condemns herself to living in an antibacterial suit.
77	71	"Switched Organizers"; Transliteration: "Surikawatta techō" (Japanese: すりかわった手帳)	Shinichi Watanabe	October 15, 1991
Young married freelance writer, Memo Matarou, notes everything he finds interesting in his electronic organizer, but loses it after a night out drinking. Moguro returns one to him, but it although it is not his, Memo finds the data inside useful, especially the contact details of many women. Moguro later returns the original organizer, but Memo had already downloaded the address book and begins a series of sexual encounters with the women listed in it. Moguro punishes him for his transgression, so when he returns home, Memo finds that Moguro has switched his beautiful wife Tsukiyo for an unattractive woman and her demanding son.
78	72	"Red or Black?!"; Transliteration: "Aka ka kuro ka!?" (Japanese: 赤か黒か!?)	Sōichirō Zen	October 22, 1991
Photographer Kakei Kazuya enjoys playing roulette in games parlors so Moguro encourages him to play for real money. Moguro takes Kakei to a secret illegal casino for a once only experience and Kakei has a good win. However, Kakei's work suffers because of his desire for easy money, and he returns a number of times to the casino with a chip that remained in his pocket. However, Kakei loses all his money, including some he borrowed from a loan shark after he does not bet on the winning number suggested by Moguro.
79	73	"Sunday Club"; Transliteration: "Nichiyō kurabu" (Japanese: 日曜クラブ)	Hiroshi Matsuzono	October 29, 1991
Uchinaki Yousuke has developed a loathing for Mondays after many years as a company man. Moguro takes Uchinaki through a building site to a secret Sunday Club where he spends a relaxing day instead of going to work. Moguro makes him promise to go only once a month, however Uchinaki returns sooner so Moguro condemns him to stay there forever.
80	74	"Life in the Woods"; Transliteration: "Mori no seikatsu" (Japanese: 森の生活)	Sōichirō Zen	November 5, 1991
Moguro distracts the busy company man Richigi Momoru on his way to work and takes him into the woods for a day off, gathering mushrooms, vegetables and fish and cooking them on an open fire. As the weeks pass, Richigi wants to return home. Moguro send him back, however Richigi also takes some of the psychedelic mushrooms they found which helps him readjust to the city life.
81	75	"Mangania" (Japanese: マンガニア)	Sōichirō Zen	November 12, 1991
Moguro buys the company man and manga addict Chuunen Takuji a valuable classic manga by Osamu Tezuka for which he is extremely grateful. Moguro then asks Chuunen to appraise an old manga titled Last Utopia by a little known artist, Ashizuka Mushio. Chuunen discovers that it is extremely rare but he offers to buy it from Moguro for only 10,000¥. Because Chuunen lied to Moguro about the value, Chuunen returns home to discover that his wife has given his entire manga collection to waste recyclers in exchange for rolls of toilet paper. Note: The rare comic Last Utopia is a reference to the manga UTOPIA the Final World War (UTOPIA 最後の世界大戦) by Fujiko A. Fujio.
82	76	"Sandlot in the Sky"; Transliteration: "Sora no ue no kūchi" (Japanese: 空の上の空地)	Shinichi Watanabe	November 26, 1991
Company man Gaki Hiromasa visits the sandlot where he used to play as a child. He recalls that he left a box of his treasures in a disused pipe, but the land is scheduled for redevelopment. Moguro offers to take Gaki to a very special sandlot which is located on the roof of a skyscraper. The place is filled with adults playing in children's clothes as they recapture their childhoods. Moguro warns him that he must not take any "adult impurities" there. Gaki makes friends with Shizu, but then he meets her later in the street. He is shocked when she says that she works as a prostitute to pay her father's debts. Gaki embezzles money to help her, and takes it to the sandlot for her which breaks his promise to Moguro. Gaki then loses access to the sandlot, and the money. Meanwhile, Shizu is revealed to not only have a boyfriend — but also be lavishly wealthy.
83	77	"Homeless Proposal"; Transliteration: "Hōmuresu no susume" (Japanese: ホームレスのすすめ)	Shinichi Watanabe	December 3, 1991
Moguro promises to take stressed company man Sudoh Reiju to a stress free environment and takes him to spend time with some homeless people. Sudoh enjoys the change and abandons his family and job. He begins to live a carefree life with his new friends and refuses to return to his former life. Instead, he sells his house and goes to live on an island with his wife and son who also embrace the carefree lifestyle.
84	78	"Super Luxury Solution"; Transliteration: "Chōgōka kāshon" (Japanese: 超豪華カーション)	Sōichirō Zen	December 10, 1991
Unmarried factory worker Tomariba Nashio has trouble finding places to park his car, and he often parks illegally. Moguro offers to provide a free parking space in a condominium where tenants park their cars inside apartments, but he must follow the rule that the building is exclusively for cars; he must not stay there nor allow anyone else to do so. Tomariba breaks Moguro's rule when he shows his condo to a woman and, too embarrassed to take her back to his messy room, spends the night with her there. Moguro condemns him never to be able to park his car again, leaving Tomariba to share his original room with it.
85	79	"Elm Tree of the Valley"; Transliteration: "Tanima no keyaki" (Japanese: 谷間のケヤキ)	Tetsushi Takayanagi	December 17, 1991
Artist, Kigami Mamoru, is confronted by a land owner who wants to cut down an old Japanese elm tree. Moguro scares them off and he encourages Kigami to live in the tree and the artist promises to defend it to the end. Kigami becomes a local celebrity and he has an exhibition of his woodland paintings which enables him to earn enough money to stay in the tree. The landowner returns and makes Kigami the offer that if he lets the tree be cut down, the developer will provide a comfortable studio and Kigami can paint an everlasting mural of the tree on the side of the building. Kigami agrees, but Moguro cannot accept his change of heart, and makes Kigami part of the tree which is about to be cut down.
SP 8 (86, 87)	SP–8	"Eerie Antiques Episode 1: MIRROR / Eerie Antiques Episode 2: DOLL"; Transliteration: "Ayashī antīku dai ichi wa MIRROR / Ayashī antīku dai ni wa DOLL" (Japanese: 妖しいアンティーク 第一話 MIRROR / 妖しいアンティーク 第二話 DOLL)	Akitaro Daichi	December 24, 1991
At Christmas time Moguro wishes blessings and joy to all the people in the world before heading out to "fill their empty souls". (1) Lonely 28 year old office worker, Kyouko Hibino, enters a strange antique shop where she is startled by Moguro and accidentally breaks an antique mirror. Moguro pays for it, and when she arrives home she finds it unbroken. Gazing into it, she feels that it makes her look more attractive and her outlook changes, increasing her popularity. Later, Moguro tells her that the mirror is cursed and she must return it to him, however she returns a facsimile and keeps the original. Moguro confronts when he discovers the deception, and when she returns home she accidentally breaks the mirror destroying her life. (2) Lonely 32 year old salaryman, Takuji Himeno, shares every Christmas eve with his collection of female dolls which he finds better company than real women. Moguro takes Himeno to the strange antique shop where he is impressed by some expensive European bisque dolls. Moguro buys him the one he desires and makes him promise to be forever faithful. It becomes his favorite and he calls it Micheline. Meanwhile, a female co-worker has taken an interest in Himeno and after a romantic dinner, he sleeps over at her apartment. As he leaves, Moguro reminds him of his promise, and when Himeno returns home, he discovers that Micheline and the other dolls have come alive. Micheline takes her revenge and kills him for his betrayal.
88	80	"The Pinkie Ring"; Transliteration: "Koyubi no koyori" (Japanese: 小指のコヨリ)	Sōichirō Zen	January 7, 1992
Company man Ishii Hirowaka is a heavy drinker, but must quit to avoid liver damage. However, he succumbs to pressure from his workmates and goes out drinking again, ignoring the paper pinkie ring on his finger from his wife to remind him not to drink. Moguro offers to help him quit and gives him a gold ring that painfully squeezes his finger if he drinks alcohol. initially it is effective, however Ishii is invited to drink with his boss and a client, so he removes the ring. When Ishii puts it back on, Moguro makes the ring shrink so tightly that it severs Ishii's finger.
89	81	"The Illusionary Amusement Park"; Transliteration: "Maboroshi no yūenchi" (Japanese: 幻の遊園地)	Shinichi Watanabe	January 14, 1992
Middle-aged unemployed man Yuchi Shuuruo is unable to find work, and spends a day at an amusement park trying to distract himself from the stress of unemployment. Moguro introduces him to an adult amusement park so that he can enjoy himself before dedicating himself to his job search. Against Moguro's instructions, Shuuruo sneaks back for another visit so Moguro sentences him to stay at an amusement park for the rest of his life by turning him into a carousel horse.
90	82	"IV Patient"; Transliteration: "Tenteki-shō kanja" (Japanese: 点滴症患者)	Sōichirō Zen	January 21, 1992
Salaryman Amae Taiji is put off by hospitals, but after being mistaken for a patient and being comforted by a nurse starts he appreciating the experience. He's admitted several more times after collapsing from overwork and becomes addicted to hospital life. Moguro lets him spend the rest of his life in a hospital being cared for, by reducing him to an infantile state of mind.
91	83	"The Billboard Girl"; Transliteration: "Kanban gāru" (Japanese: 看板ガール)	Shinichi Watanabe	January 28, 1992
Moguro arranges for the illustrator, Yumemi Douta to meet Linda, his dream billboard model. They spend the evening together in his apartment where he produces many illustrations of her. Later his boss sees the illustrations and uses one for a magazine cover. Douta wants to see Linda again and Moguro agrees as long as Douta keeps the situation platonic. Unfortunately Douta tries to grab Linda and she leaves. Douta next wants to be with a different woman on a new billboard and Moguro so inserts him into the poster.
92	84	"After 5 Club"; Transliteration: "Afutā 5 CLUB" (Japanese: アフター5CLUB)	Hiroshi Matsuzono	February 4, 1992
Salaryman, Temochi Fusata is bored with his life in a corporate town where everyone is forced to use the company facilities for recreation. Moguro takes him to the exclusive underground "After 5 Club" wearing a disguise where he meets a co-worker Michiyo who he has been wanting to date. They get on well, but whenever Temochi returns to the club, Michiyo is always with another client and he becomes jealous. He confronts her in the office and reveals the existence of the club, so Moguro turns Temochi into a hostess so that he can stay in the club forever.
93	85	"Golf Domino Toppling"; Transliteration: "Gorufu domino-taoshi" (Japanese: ゴルフ・ドミノ倒し)	Sōichirō Zen	February 11, 1992
Company CEO, Awate Taizou, is invited to a pro golf tournament but is anxious about his game and hitting bystanders with a wayward shot. Moguro helps him gain confidence, but he must only use the five iron supplied by Moguro. On the day of the game, under peer pressure, Awate switches to a driver, and hits the ball astray, knocking down the bystanders like dominos.
94	86	"Silver Bank"; Transliteration: "Shirubā banku" (Japanese: シルバーバンク)	Sōichirō Zen	February 18, 1992
Salaryman, Katei Nobumitsu, wants to enter a grandfather and son home video competition but his father is dead. Moguro offers to provide an old man for the video from the "Silver Bank" of elderly volunteers. The aged Mr Ohkubo fills the position too well, and Nobumitsu's son Tarou wants him to stay on which is against Moguro's rules. Ohkubo then takes ill and Nobumitsu has to care for him for the rest of the man's life.
95	87	"Lamp in the Valley"; Transliteration: "Tanima no tomoshibi" (Japanese: 谷間の灯)	Shinichi Watanabe	February 25, 1992
Salaryman, Usagi Oishi, finds his house too small for his growing children. Moguro offers him a vacant house in the countryside, but they are warned not to enter a foggy valley. His family like it, so they move there and he visits on weekends. However when he stays in the city on weekend, his family are lured into the valley. When he arrives home his family are gone, but he joins them on a farm in the valley which exists in the past where life was much more simple.
96	88	"Eternal Residence"; Transliteration: "Eien no sumika" (Japanese: 永遠のすみか)	Sōichirō Zen	March 3, 1992
Middle aged salaryman, Hakaba Motomu, collapses at work and begins to think about his own mortality. Unfortunately, he cannot find an affordable burial plot in the city, so Moguro provides a solution where Motomu and his wife move into a combined apartment building and graveyard on the outskirts of the city.
97	89	"The Man in the Food Section"; Transliteration: "Shokuhin uriba oji-san" (Japanese: 食品売場おじさん)	Hiroshi Matsuzono	March 10, 1992
Salaryman, Ukai Yorimichi, likes window shopping in food sections. However, he is criticized by his wife if he spends money on pre-prepared food after she has spent time cooking for him. Moguro offers Yorimichi free use of an apartment where he can indulge his food desires, but his wife tracks him to the apartment and makes a scene. Moguro decides to switch their residences, so the wife enjoys store-bought food in the apartment while Yorimichi is left at home, suffering malnutrition from eating only store-bought food instead of home cooking.
98	90	"Blue-Eyed Japanese"; Transliteration: "Burū ai japanīzu" (Japanese: ブルー・アイ・ジャパニーズ)	Hiroshi Matsuzono	March 17, 1992
Kent Pincarton, an American trading firm worker in Japan, is having trouble balancing time with his wife and the work demands of after hours socializing. Moguro offers to teach him how to be more like a Japanese businessman, but Moguru only makes the situation with his wife even worse. However, one evening when he brings some co-workers home late, he finds his wife has fully embraced Japanese culture and has become the perfect Japanese hostess.
99	91	"Night Train"; Transliteration: "Yakōressha" (Japanese: 夜行列車)	Yoshitomo Yonetani	March 24, 1992
Salaryman Komiya Tomoo takes Moguro's advice to take a spontaneous train ride out of the city to leave his oppressive life behind. Stopping for a drink at the end of the line, he meets a beautiful innkeeper. She invites him to stay with her and help out at her business and he agrees instead of leaving. Some time later, Moguro tells Tomoo to call home and he learns that his wife has been hospitalized, prompting him to return. As he tearfully catches the train home, the innkeeper stands on the platform crying as she watches him leave.

== Season 3 ==
No. overall	No. in series	Title	Directed by	Original release date
SP 9 (100)	SP–9	"Imani Miterou's Secret Revenge Sheet"; Transliteration: "Imani Miterō no himitsu fukushū keikaku hyō" (Japanese: 今仁見手郎の秘密復讐計画表)	Akitaro Daichi	July 7, 1992
Near-sighted and accident-prone 12 year old Elementary schoolboy, Imani Miterou, writes down everything that happens to him in his small notebook – this includes when he is invited by cute Shiruko to watch the fireworks on Tanabata with her, when other students bully or insult him, or when Moguro saves him from being scratched by the local stray cat. Each evening above his father's fishing shop, Miterou marks black or white stars against those on his list based on their interactions with him. If a tormentor earns ten black stars, Miterou takes revenge on them, also making a gyotaku of them as a trophy. When the cat earns ten black stars, Miterou catches it and prepares to take his revenge, but Moguro interrupts him, earning him black stars. Moguro challenges Miterou to stop his actions after he traps the bully Gamaguchi in a deep hole and then dupes two bikers into taking revenge for him on the local bulldog, Dosu. Instead Miterou plans to get rid of Moguro because he knows too much, but Moguro is too cunning and he turns the tables on Miterou making the boy into a gyotaku of himself.
101	92	"Sneak Member"; Transliteration: "Mogurimenbā" (Japanese: モグリメンバー)	Sōichirō Zen	July 14, 1992
Moguri Irizou sneaks onto an expensive golf course to enjoy his game, since he can't afford membership fees. Moguro offers him a VIP membership, as long as he plays on the third Monday of each month and plays alone. Irizou's boss finds out he's a member at the country club and pressures Irizou to take him. However while on the course, the two are apprehended and beaten up for playing with a fake membership card.
102	93	"Energy Mushroom"; Transliteration: "Sutamina kinoko" (Japanese: スタミナ茸)	Tetsushi Takanayagi	July 21, 1992
Warui Kanzou is a middle-aged man who is advised to stop exerting himself because of liver damage. Moguro offers Kanzuo an extract from a rare mushroom in Okuhida extract to restore his vitality, but warns him one bottle must last a month. After using it up too soon, Kanzou travels to Okuhida to find more, but after eating the wrong mushrooms, he turns into a mushroom himself.
103	94	"Long-Distance Commute"; Transliteration: "Chōkyori tsūkin" (Japanese: 長距離通勤)	Sōichirō Zen	July 28, 1992
Office worker Nagai Michinori has a four-hour commute to work. Moguro offers him a lavish condo that's extremely close to his office, but he's forbidden from using it during the weekend or on holidays. He gets drunk celebrating his good fortune with his boss and accidentally visits on a holiday, and soon after Nagai's co-workers find his corpse in his office locker.
104	95	"The Paradise of Dreams"; Transliteration: "Yume no rakuen" (Japanese: 夢の楽園)	Hiroshi Matsuzono	August 4, 1992
Hideo Otaku is fascinated by the island of Tahiti, hoping to visit there somebody. Moguro shows him a VR nightclub that authentically recreates a visit to the island, but warns Hideo to only enjoy the club's pleasures inside its intended environment. Hideo falls in love with a beautiful server named Marie and invites her to a real beach resort, but is horrified when the sun and water reveal she's made of paint and melts.
105	96	"Kindergarten President"; Transliteration: "Shachō yōchien" (Japanese: 社長幼稚園)	Sōichirō Zen	August 11, 1992
The busy CEO of a Kindergarten business, Oyamano Taizou desires the freedom that children enjoy. Moguro enrols him to a kindergarten for adults, but warns that he must not bring in any external power imbalances. After being victimised by a bully in the kindergarten, Taizou later discovers that the man is head of a construction company seeking a building contract. Taizou agrees to the contract on the condition that the man allows Taizou to bully him in the kindergarten. For breaching the conditions, Moguro turns Taizou back into a child.
106	97	"The Fixer"; Transliteration: "Jidan-ya" (Japanese: 示談屋)	Akitaro Daichi	August 18, 1992
Moguro offers to protect the married celebrity Mizuno Shouhei who is photographed while dating a young idol from the same agency. He sends the elderly fixer Uma to deal with the photographer. However, Mizuno gets into trouble again and Moguro agrees to help only if he stops his philandering and cherishes his wife Taeko. Mizuno soon falls for Keiko, a woman in a bar and divorces Taeko to demonstrate his love. However, when he proposes to Keiko, she rejects him and reveals that she's the younger sister of a woman who committed suicide after Mizuno rejected her. Uma then presents Mizuno with many incriminating photographs to blackmail him.
107	98	"Class Reunion"; Transliteration: "Dōsōkai" (Japanese: 同窓会)	Tetsushi Takanayagi	August 25, 1992
Douki Manabu, one of a quartet of aging men who are drinking buddies since their school days is excited at Moguro's recommendation they invite a beautiful female classmate, Yoshiko the Class Madonna, to attend one of their reunion parties but Moguro tells Douki he must never monopolize and make a move on her risk damaging his friendship with his drinking buddies. Unfortunately, he ignores Moguro's condition and had a one night stand with her. She then swindles them all by pretending to have financial difficulties within her business, ruining the men's friendships and costing them their jobs. Moguro rekindles their friendship by turning them into a group of homeless drunks hanging out in their old ragged school uniforms.
108	99	"Private Tutor"; Transliteration: "Kateikyōshi" (Japanese: 家庭教師)	Sōichirō Zen	September 1, 1992
Yokomichi Yukio is concerned about his son Manabu's academic ability, and Moguro sends in a tutor who teaches Manabu to play and have fun. Manabu's grades improve and Yukio agrees to him joining a mahjong game with his friends and Manabu wins. However Manabu is so successful, he then becomes a professional mahjong player.
109	100	"Remaining Years"; Transliteration: "Yosei" (Japanese: 余生)	Hiroshi Matsuzono	September 8, 1992
Elderly Mukai Osamu leads a quiet life, but he is browbeaten by those around him such as his family and a fellow croquet player. Moguro advises him to be more assertive and when he changes his behaviour, people are surprised by his new attitude but Moguro advises him to be still respectful to his fellow elders and must not defy their wishes too. However, he takes it too far and pushes over the croquet player who has been bullying him, exposing his baldness and false teeth. He also becomes too demanding with his daughter-in-law so Moguro commits him to living totally alone.
110	101	"Self-service Drink Area"; Transliteration: "Dorinkubā" (Japanese: ドリンクバー)	Sōichirō Zen	September 15, 1992
The lyricist Nikken, is not feeling well and Moguro introduces him to special drinks made from exotic ingredients, however he is not allowed drink anywhere else. The drinks not only improve his health, but improve his work output and he creates a successful drink campaign. However, after he drinks some of the product delivered to his home from the sponsor who used his work in the commercial, he turns into a root vegetable.
111	102	"Luck With Men"; Transliteration: "Otokoun" (Japanese: 男運)	Akitaro Daichi	September 22, 1992
Moguro gives a scarf to office lady Norie who has had no luck with men, but he warns her to always wear the scarf when she is dating and must never take it off. After she wears the scarf she is proposed by two different men. Norie accepts a diamond necklace from the president of a business partner but takes off the scarf. When she returns to her apartment, the necklace gets caught in the elevator doors and she chokes to death.
112	103	"The Way of the Husband and Wife"; Transliteration: "Shufu dō" (Japanese: 主夫道)	Sōichirō Zen	September 29, 1992
Newlyweds Kaji Daisuke and his wife are both working full-time and although he wants to share the housework, he is completely useless at cooking and laundry. Moguro enrols Kaji in a housework culture school and he is completely changed, surprising his wife with his new skills and rekindling their romance. Kaji's wife is later appointed to a section chief position with a higher salary, so Kaji resigns his job so that he can focus on the housework. However, Kaji becomes so domestic, that Moguro sentences him to become pregnant with their baby.

== Special Programming ==
These episodes aired together on three specific days as 2 hour specials.

No. overall	No. in series	Title	Directed by	Original release date
113	1	"Love Me Terrible"; Transliteration: "Rabumī tondā" (Japanese: ラブミー・トンダー)	Akitaro Daichi	December 26, 1992
Dazai Kurashi, a young salaryman, is infatuated with Ms. Kawabe Mari. However, he finds that she is dating Mr. Kisada from their workplace and is distraught when she invites him back to her apartment. Moguro offers to help and creates situations where all of Dazai's rivals at work find themselves in compromising situations. Dazai eventually wins Mari, but when he uses Moguro's technique to separate other women from their lovers, Moguro turns the tables on him.
114	2	"Karaoke Palace"; Transliteration: "Karaoke paresu" (Japanese: カラオケパレス)	Hiroshi Matsuzono	December 26, 1992
Moguro treats a karaoke addict with poor social skills, salaryman Hatame Kazuhisa, to a night out at Karaoke Palace where he can sing to his heart's content to an appreciative holographic audience. Hatame enjoys it so much that Moguro gives him a membership card, although he must not take anyone else there. However one night, Hatame takes his workmates who do not believe it exists, and that night the audience boos him offstage.
115	3	"The Waiting Woman"; Transliteration: "Matsu onna" (Japanese: 待つ女)	Sōichirō Zen	December 26, 1992
Moguro enters the Evening Primrose bar managed by the lonely 31 year old Yoi Machiko and orders champagne. She opens the bottle that she was saving for the return her former lover, Mr. Handa, her married supervisor at another bar. Moguro offers her a position at a rehabilitation center in the Shinshu mountains, but reminds her that she must not develop an emotional relationship with anyone. She is happy there, however when Handa is admitted after a car accident, she falls in love with him again and Moguro turns her into an elderly woman.
116	4	"The Illusionary Super Racer"; Transliteration: "Maboroshi no sūpārēsā" (Japanese: 幻のスーパーレーサー)	Akitaro Daichi	December 26, 1992
Kurumao Takuo, a young auto mechanic, wants to be a race car driver but is unable to get a license. Moguro sends him a VR capsule where he becomes a champion racer but is warned not to bring anyone else into it. When his girlfriend Naoko wants to know what he's been doing, Takuo brings her into the capsule as his navigator in a rally race. They kiss during the winning lap, believing they'll be safe since it's not real, but drive off a cliff and are killed.
117	5	"Troublesome Love"; Transliteration: "Taihen ai" (Japanese: 大変愛)	Akitaro Daichi	April 6, 1993
Moteuchi Gajirou, a high school student with a heart-shaped head, is mocked by his peers for being unattractive. When he is invited to a party and told he must bring a plus one, Gajirou stumbles upon the antique shop from "A Strange Antique" and finds Cupid's bow and a heart locket, which Moguro buys for him. Gajirou uses the items to make his favorite idol fall in love with him and brings her to the party. But, in a scene out of his romance manga, he ends his relationship with her, saying that she belongs to her fans and he can't keep her all to himself. However, this endears all of Gajirou's female classmates, who swarm him.
118	6	"Survival of the Fittest"; Transliteration: "Jakunikukyōshoku" (Japanese: 弱肉強食)	Akitaro Daichi	April 6, 1993
Aona is a worker who is constantly bullied by his co-workers, especially Ushikawa, a childhood bully turned co-worker who still bullies Aona at adulthood. Moguro gives Aona a voodoo doll to get revenge on Ushikawa. Moguro even gets Aona to start eating "special" meat, as he becomes encouraged to be "strong" after Ushikawa forces him to eat meat, due to Aona's vegetarianism. Aona starts to feel wary about using the doll to hurt Ushikawa, but his co-workers humiliate him once more. Aona uses the doll to kill Ushikawa, and as he eats the "special" meat, Aona begins to resemble Ushikawa.
119	7	"Beloved Dog Story"; Transliteration: "Aiken monogatari" (Japanese: 愛犬物語)	Sōichirō Zen	April 6, 1993
Inuki's new job offers him an apartment to stay in, but is unable to take his pet dog, due to the apartment having a no pet policy. Moguro hypnotizes the dog to disguise itself as a person, so Inuki can keep him. But Moguro tells Inuki that he must disguise his dog only out of necessity. Unfortunately, he gets too comfortable with his dog being "human" making his dog do all his work and chores, breaking Moguro's rule. Inuki is turned into a dog and is sent away to the pound, while his dog takes his place at the apartment as its new tenant permanently.
120	8	"Dummy"; Transliteration: "Damii" (Japanese: ダミイ)	Sōichirō Zen	April 6, 1993
Yawai Kazuo is constantly walked on by his girlfriend Kinuko. Moguro gives him Ginny, a dummy girlfriend to make her jealous. It works but Yawai ends up falling in love with Ginny and begs to see her again. Kinuko later finds Yawai in an S&M dungeon with Ginny as his dominatrix.
121	9	"The Division That Does Nothing"; Transliteration: "Nanimo shinai ka" (Japanese: 何もしない課)	Akitaro Daichi	April 6, 1993
Oohito Yoshio is transferred to the Munin division at work, where the men do nothing all day. Moguro helps him by sending a beautiful woman named Machiko to liven up the division's environment, he tells him that Machiko was sent to help the whole division, not only Oohito and must never approach her for personal reasons. Yoshio sees his fellow worker, Hosoi being rude to Machiko then he tells her not to help him telling her he was going to leave soon which Machiko reluctantly does, breaking Moguro's condition. When Hosoi is promoted to section chief of Munin while Mr. Tadokoro, the previous chief was given amnesty and got transferred, he kills himself and stating his reason for his act is that he couldn't wait for another amnesty anymore. Machiko leaves tearfully for being unable to help with Hosoi's depression and Yoshio tries to go after her, he's stopped by Moguro. Moguro accuses Yoshio of wanting to keep Machiko for himself and condemns him to stay at the Munin division forever, which becomes even worse with Machiko gone.
122	10	"The Pillow of Vain Dreams"; Transliteration: "Kantan no yume makura" (Japanese: 邯鄲の夢枕)	Yoshitomo Yonetani	December 28, 1993
Kasumi Bousaku is abused at both home and work, his only respite being dreams about a girl named Yumeko. Moguro gives him the pillow from the play "The Handan Dream" but warns him against using it too much. The pillow gives Kasumi good dreams but he is always rudely snapped back to reality. He eventually begs Moguro to let him sleep and dream forever, so Moguro puts him in a shack on top of a skyscraper where he is with Yumeko in his dreams but is a withered old man in reality.
123	11	"Turn-Around Golfer"; Transliteration: "Hyōhen gorufā" (Japanese: 豹変ゴルファー)	Sōichirō Zen	December 28, 1993
Oshii Shinobu is a quiet salaryman whose pent-up stress turn him into a monster on the golf course. After a disastrous game with his new boss, Moguro hypnotizes him into remaining calm while holding a golf club but warns him not to bottle up his anger all the time or risk letting his stress explode elsewhere. After a much better game, Oshii drives his boss home, only to develop road rage.
124	12	"Old Cinema Paradise"; Transliteration: "Ōrudo shinema paradaisu" (Japanese: オールド・シネマ・パラダイス)	Sōichirō Zen	December 28, 1993
Katsudo Daisuke is a gekiga artist who is a huge fan of old historical dramas but his manga are constantly rejected due to publishers saying samurai stories are old-fashioned. Moguro takes Daisuke to a movie theater exactly like the one Daisuke's late father owned that plays only old movies. When told to modernize his latest story and suffering more abuse from his wife, Daisuke goes back to the theater and asks Moguro to let him stay forever. Later, Daisuke's wife comes to Moguro to ask what became of him and Moguro takes her to the theater, now run-down and abandoned, where the movies are still playing but Daisuke now in them.
125	13	"The Man Whose Business Downsized manga" Transliteration: "Risutora no otoko" (Japanese: リストラの男)	Akitaro Daichi	December 28, 1993
Kareki Shouhei is made a salesman at the car company he works at due to restructuring but is terrible at it. Moguro introduces him to a coach to help him but warns him not be hasty in landing sales. Shouhei ends up ruining a sale his coach had been building up and Moguro gives him a new job selling tricycles to children.
126	14	"Invitation to the Down-Train"; Transliteration: "Kudari densha e no shōtai" (Japanese: 下り電車への招待)	Akitaro Daichi	December 28, 1993
Yumeno Douta fantasizes about the opposite train he passes and his morning commute and Moguro puts him on it. He arrives in a town called Kazedomari where he falls in love with Kanako, the owner of the bar. After a while, Moguro tells Douta to go back home but he refuses to leave. That night, Kanako's older brother drives him out of town. However, it's revealed Kanako had asked him to do it, having sensed Douta's feelings and believing that she's too old to start a new life.

== New Laughing Salesman ==
No.	Titles	Directed by	Written by	Original airdate
1	"Daydream / Make A Budget And Stick To It"; Transliteration: "Hakuchūmu / Goriyō wa keikakuteki ni" (Japanese: 白昼夢 / ご利用は計画的に)	Yoshihiko Iwata	Naohiro Fukushima	April 3, 2017
(1) A young company man Nakajima Kenichi is introduced to a hidden Daydream Club by his workmates and Moguro encourages him to spend more time there which costs a fortune and makes him and his friend risk their jobs. (2) An office lady Takashima Mitsuko who is unpopular and unhappy at work loves shopping but runs out of money. Moguro gives her an unlimited credit card, although anything purchased with the card will be repossessed the next day. When she uses the card for beauty treatments, she wakes up the next day as an ugly hag.
2	"Hot Spring Eccentricity / Fantasy Company"; Transliteration: "Onsen kikō / Maboroshi gaisha" (Japanese: 温泉奇行 / マボロシガイシャ)	Nobuyoshi Arai	Naohiro Fukushima	April 10, 2017
(1) A mature company man Kihara Shisao with a liking for hot springs is encouraged by Moguro to indulge his passion but it ends up costing a fortune. (2) A young employee Deyashiro Iyata quits his job after being bullied by his boss. Moguro introduces him to a Fantasy Company where people change roles each day. He ends up behaving just as badly as his former boss, so Moguro condemns him to work there forever as an example of a tyrannical boss.
3	"Lunchbox Wars / Ah, My Beloved 583-series" Transliteration: "Bentō sensō / Ā, itoshino 583-kei" (Japanese: 弁当戦争 / ああ、愛しの583系)	Yū Kino	Naohiro Fukushima	April 17, 2017
(1) A young company man Amae Masao lives with his mother, who makes a traditional bento lunch each day but his girlfriend also makes one for him. Moguro gives him a magic powder that makes his mother's bento taste delicious to his girlfriend. However, when it runs out he is forced to finally decide between his mother and his girlfriend. (2) A middle-aged salesman Kamera Tetsuya is a train fanatic, but his sales estimates are poor. Moguro gives him a once-only chance to ride on his favorite 583 series train, however after he boards the train again he is condemned to stay on it forever.
4	"The Woman On The Platform / Runner's Paradise"; Transliteration: "Purattohōmu no onna / Sōkōsha tengoku" (Japanese: プラットホームの女 / 走行者天国)	Hiroyuki Ōshima	Asami Ishikawa; Midori Natsu	April 24, 2017
(1) A dull young banker Naoki Junichi falls in love with a woman wearing a medical face mask he sees every day on the train. Moguro arranges a meeting with her, but demands that he does not love her only for her looks. He agrees, but then is horrified when she reveals her true ugly face that is the result of failed plastic surgery. (2) A company man Michihara Kakeru runs to relieve stress, but is continually frustrated by obstacles and pedestrians. He runs into Moguro who offers him Runners' Paradise pass to keep his path clear, however he must keep it a secret. When he meets a beautiful woman runner who wants to run with him he makes a copy of the pass for her, but she shares it on social media rendering his copy invalid.
5	"Sunday Club / The Woman Who Throws Away"; Transliteration: "Nichiyō / Sutechau onna" (Japanese: 日曜クラブ / 捨てちゃう女)	Yoshiaki Okumura	Naohiro Fukushima; Midori Natsu	May 1, 2017
(1) An old company man Uchinaki Yousuke is tired of his boring existence, so Moguro introduces him to a Sunday Club where he is treated like a king, but is only allowed to go once a month. When he returns to the club too soon, Moguro makes him an eternal member. (2) A housewife Monomochi Tomie has a house full of clutter from her husband's train collection and her son's trophies. Moguro helps her to start de-cluttering, but she ends up throwing out almost everything, so her husband and son leave home.
6	"I'll Lease This Monster / Tonight's Another Awesome Night"; Transliteration: "Kaibutsu kashimasu / Konya mo saikō" (Japanese: かいぶつかします / 今夜も最高)	Yoshihiko Iwata	Hirofumi Ogura; Naohiro Fukushima	May 8, 2017
(1) A physically huge actor Udo Taizou has trouble getting work. Moguro provides a scary disguise so that he can get work in monster roles, but when he goes back to his greedy former manager with the promise of a big movie role, Moguro curses him so that the mask won't come off. (2) A night-owl college student Doraki Tomoyoshi gets a sleeping potion from Moguro so he can enjoy the daytime with his girlfriend. Unfortunately he lapses and stays out all night with his friends so Moguro makes him a permanent day person, however his girlfriend tells him she has just got a night job.
7	"The Man Who Transformed / The Rule of Mommy Friends"; Transliteration: "Baketa otoko / Mama-tomo no okite" (Japanese: 化けた男 / ママ友のおきて)	Nobuyoshi Arai; Fumio Itō	Asami Ishikawa; Naohiro Fukushima	May 15, 2017
(1) A company man Isobe Kinichi with a wife and child has a mundane life and wishes for some adventure. Moguro encourages him to wear a disguise and have nights out on the town, but then Moguro really gives him a new life, in a small apartment with a wife and four children. (2) A housewife and part-time worker Shizuoka Nozomi is unhappy about Oniyo, a domineering head of their mothers' group in her apartment building. Moguro grants Nozomi's wish to make Oniyo's proposals come true to keep her placated, but then Oniyo suggests that Nozomi move out because her son is too boisterous.
8	"A Man Chased By His Dreams / Mustache Taxi"; Transliteration: "Yume ni owareru otoko / Hige takushī" (Japanese: 夢に追われる男 / ひげタクシー)	Yū Kino; Park Kyong-sun	Asami Ishikawa	May 22, 2017
(1) A middle-aged scriptwriter Yumemi Ashi has nightmares of being chased, so Moguro gives him some Pleasant Dreams Candy, but warns him to take only one per night. However, in his new dream he meets a beautiful young woman who falls in love with him. He takes more candy to complete the dream, but it turns into another type of nightmare, witch becomes a reality killing Yumeshi. (2) A timid young taxi driver Yowagoshi Sugiru has difficulty in dealing with troublesome customers and is the lowest earner. Moguro gives him a mustache to make him look less timid, but warns him to only use it when necessary. However, he leaves the mostache on and becomes too aggressive. When he picks up two bank robbers who say they are in a hurry, he drives aggressively and is arrested for helping them escape.
9	"The Nostalgic Bathhouse Tour / The Researcher's Melancholy"; Transliteration: "Natsukashi no sentō tsuā / Kenkyūsha wa yūutsu" (Japanese: 懐かしの銭湯ツアー / 研究者はユウウツ)	Hiroyuki Ōshima	Asami Ishikawa; Naohiro Fukushima	May 29, 2017
1) An unemployed man Bandai Mamoru has a passion for old style bathhouses with classic paintings, and meets Moguro who offers to help him in his quest. Moguro takes him to a members-only bathhouse, which is not only in the classic style, has a painting with three key visual elements, but also a beautiful young female attendant. The man pleads to go again saying that he is only interested in the painting, so Moguro gives him the entry pass. However when the man enters, the place shows all the signs of being abandoned, and instead of the young attendant he is confronted by a ghost of the long-dead attendant. (2) A mature part-time researcher Towani Manabu is frustrated by the lack of time to produce results and is bitter that his ex-girlfriend submitted his research before he did. Moguro offers him and his team a modern lab in which he can stay if he can produce results in 3 months but he must concentrate on his research. After 3 months, his research shows no positive results, but he overhears that one of his team has better results by using a more radical approach. He accesses the research and publishes it in his own name, however he can't explain the experimental process to the media and loses all credibility.
10	"The Person in the Acquired Film / Fake Grandchild"; Transliteration: "Hirotta firumu no hito / Uso mago" (Japanese: 拾ったフィルムのヒト / ウソ孫)	Yoshiaki Okumura	Naohiro Fukushima; Asami Ishikawa	June 5, 2017
(1) A building foreman Tayori Naiichi wants to meet a woman, Michiko, whose photographs were processed instead of his own when their cameras were accidentally switched. Moguro arranges a meeting with Michiko, but the foreman ends up with her pushy, overweight friend Nobue instead. The foreman continues seeing Nobue hoping to connect with Michiko, but Moguro warns him to stop if he still desires Michiko. However, lonely after a drinking late, he spends the night with Nobue. Moguro then arranges for him to spend the rest of his life with Nobue. (2) A recently retired grandfather Oite Kazuhito misses his grandchild. Moguro puts a messaging service on his mobile phone that appears to be about his grandson but warns him not to try to contact the family. After initial skepticism, he embraces the service and it becomes part of his life. However after he tries to approach the family, Moguro sentences him to become just one more lonely man in a long line of grandfathers delivering presents to the family.
11	"Destructive Tendencies / I'm An Idol"; Transliteration: "Hametsu-shō kanja / Watashi wa aidoru" (Japanese: 破滅症患者 / 私はアイドル)	Nobuyoshi Arai; Fumio Itō	Asami Ishikawa; Hirofumi Ogura	June 12, 2017
(1) A high-performing company man Ochiiri Matsuo with a perfect home life secretly desires some risk in his life and has self-destructive thoughts. Moguro encourages him to test his resolve, but, confronted with the reality of real risk in a bar in a seedy part of town, he realizes that it endangers his current happy life. However he goes to the bar again and then has to be taken home by his wife after becoming extremely drunk. (2) A stage mom Mamano Ari with high ambitions for her performing daughter is horrified when her daughter wants to be a normal girl instead of an idol. Moguro gives the mother charms that will make her daughter obey her, but they have a time limit. When the mother exceeds the time limit Moguro condemns her to be an over-age eternal idol contestant herself.
12	"The King of the Chat Room / Japan Overseas Trip"; Transliteration: "Chattorūmu no ōsama / Nippon gaigairyokō" (Japanese: チャットルームの王様 / ニッポン海外旅行)	Shōko Shiga; Hirofumi Ogura	Naohiro Fukushima; Hirofumi Ogura	June 19, 2017
(1) A young freelancer Amikumo Tsuyoshi is banned from a chat room after flaming with an internet troll. He joins another chat room where he meets Moguro who gives him some software to track any user's comments in other Chat Rooms, but is cautioned to only use it if being attacked. However he uses it excessively and becomes a Troll himself. Moguro then exposes all of his personal data online, forcing him out of Chat Rooms forever. (2) A lonely office lady Shimai Chikako wants to go on an overseas trip where she hopes to meet a boyfriend but cannot afford it. Moguro offers her a very cheap trip and she jumps at the offer. However, she finds that he misled her and they just dine in a French restaurant in Tokyo, but she does meet a charming French man there. Who is later revealed to be a scammer, stealing all of her money.
