= Shin-Ei Animation =

Japanese animation studio

Shin-Ei Animation Co., Ltd.
- Logo used since 2026

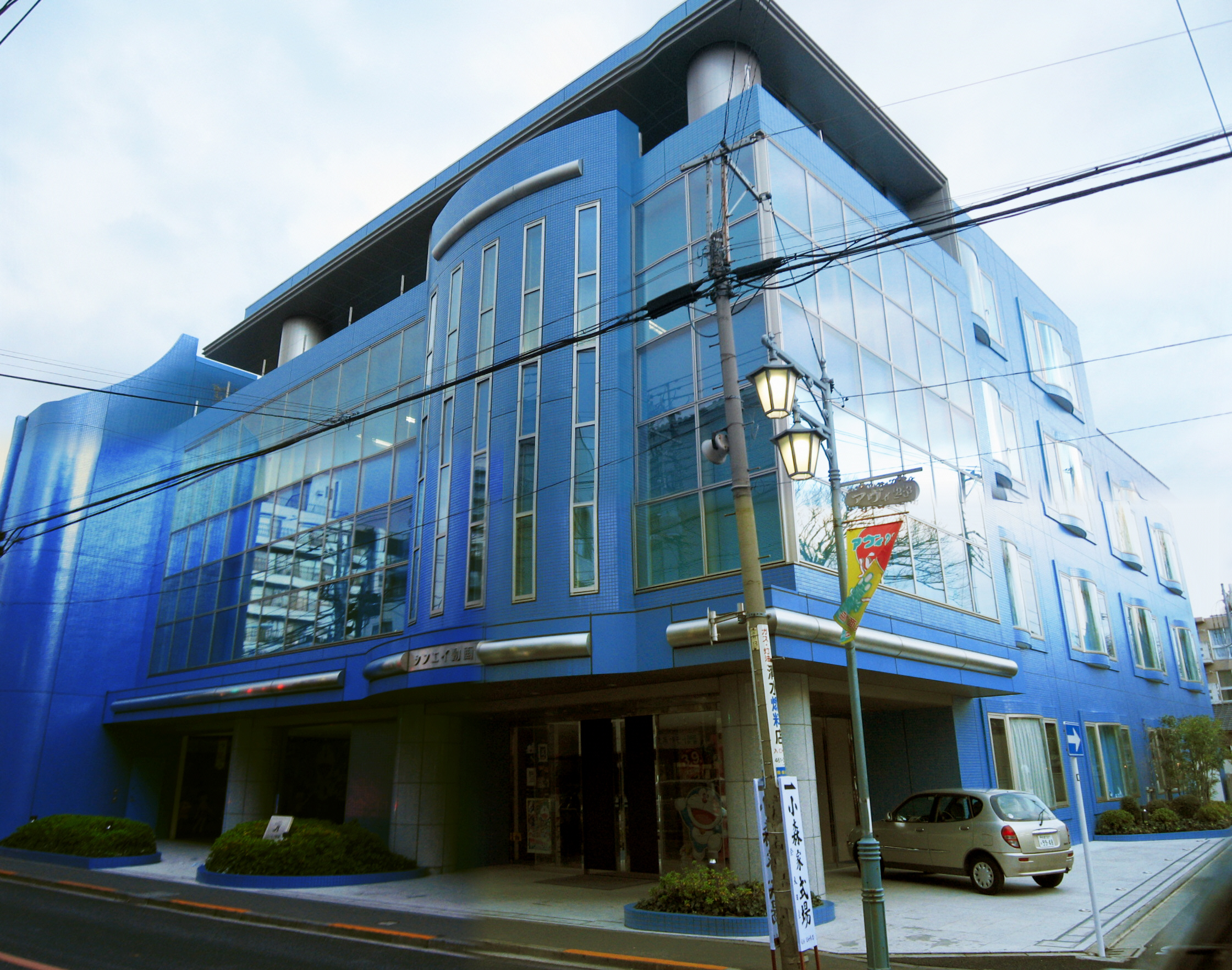
- Headquarters in Nishitōkyō, Tokyo
- Native name: シンエイ動画株式会社
- Romanized name: Shīn'eī Dōga Kabushiki-gaisha
- Formerly: A Production, Limited (1965–1976)
- Type: Subsidiary
- Industry: Japanese animation; Character licensing
- Founded: December 1965; 60 years ago (as A Production); September 9, 1976; 50 years ago (as Shin-Ei Animation)
- Founder: Daikichirō Kusube
- Headquarters: Tanashichō, Nishitōkyō, Tokyo, Japan
- Key people: Michiko Umezawa (president)
- Number of employees: 182 (as of March 1, 2026)
- Parent: TV Asahi Corporation
- Subsidiaries: SynergySP; Gathering Holdings
- Website: shin-ei-animation.jp

Shin-Ei Animation Co., Ltd. (Japanese: シンエイ動画株式会社, Hepburn: Shīn'eī Dōga Kabushiki-gaisha), also simply known as Shin-ei (シンエイ, Shīn'eī) is a Japanese animation studio founded in 1965 as A Production by Daikichirō Kusube, who was previously an animator for Toei Animation. In 1976, the studio was refounded as Shin-Ei Animation when Kusube split from Tokyo Movie.

Shin-Ei Animation is headquartered in Tanashichō, Nishitōkyō, Tokyo and has an additional studio in Chūō-ku, Kobe, Hyogo Prefecture.

== History ==
Logo used from 1976 to 2021.

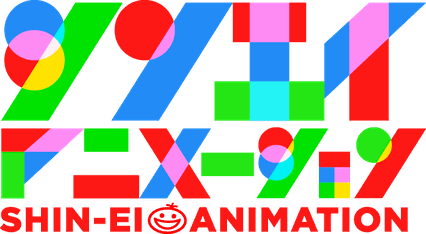
Logo used from 2021 to 2026.

Shin-Ei Animation's history began in December 1965 as A Production (Aプロダクション, Ei Purodakshon) by Daikichirō Kusube who was then a former animator at Toei Animation.

Disgruntled by the rigid hierarchy prevalent in Toei Animation he, and a couple of his colleagues, formed A Production, and immediately got into a partnership with the newly-formed Tokyo Movie, under the condition that Kusube would remain independent.

For ten years, A Production served as Tokyo Movie's primary subcontractor for animation as well as co-production.

In 1976, after Tokyo Movie founded Telecom Animation Film, they offered Kusube to lead the division. However, knowing he would lose his independence, he refused, cut all ties with Tokyo Movie and restructured his company to Shin-Ei Animation (シンエイ動画, Shin-ei Douga).

Shin-Ei Animation is best known as the animation studio behind two widely famous Japanese anime series, Doraemon and Crayon Shin-chan, which have aired on TV Asahi since 1979 and 1992 respectively; Shin-Ei Animation has since produced television series and films of the two anime series.

In 2010, TV Asahi announced it had officially acquired the animation studio.

In April 2017, SynergySP became a subsidiary of the company.

== Work list ==
Works currently airing on Japanese television are in bold.

=== Television ===
As A-Production (i.e. co-produced with Tokyo Movie)

==== 1960s ====
- Obake no Q-Tarō
- Perman
- Kyojin no Hoshi
- Kaibutsu-kun (1968)
- Roppō Yabure-kun
- Moomin
- Attack No. 1

==== 1970s ====
(Co-produced with Tokyo Movie)

- Shin Obake no Q-Tarō
- Tensai Bakabon
- Lupin The Third Part I
- Akado Suzunosuke
- Dokonjō Gaeru
- Jungle Kurobee
- Kōya no Shōnen Isamu
- Karate Baka Ichidai
- Samurai Giants
- Judo Sanka
- First Human Giatrus
- Gamba no Bouken
- Ganso Tensai Bakabon
- Hana no Kakarichō
- Ore wa Teppei (1977–78, co-production with Nippon Animation)
- Highschool Baseball Ninja (1978)

As Shin-Ei Animation

==== 1970s ====
- Doraemon (1979–2005)
- Heart of the Red Bird (1979)

==== 1980s ====
- Kaibutsu-kun (September 2, 1980 – September 28, 1982)
- Ninja Hattori-kun (September 28, 1981 – December 25, 1987)
- Game Center Arashi (1982)
- Fuku-chan (1982–84)
- Perman (April 4, 1983 – March 31, 1985) (co-production with TMS Entertainment)
- Oyoneko Boonyan (1984)
- Pro Golfer Saru (1985–88, co-produced with Studio Deen)
- Obake no Q-Tarō (April 1, 1985 – March 29, 1987)
- Esper Mami (April 7, 1987 – October 26, 1989)
- Ultra B (1987–89)
- Tsurupika Hagemaru-kun (1987–89)
- New Pro Golfer Saru (1988)
- Biriken (1988–89)
- Oishinbo (October 17, 1988 – March 17, 1992)
- Obotchama-kun (1989–92)
- Biriken Nandemo Shokai (1989)
- The Laughing Salesman (October 10, 1989 – September 29, 1992)
- Chimpui (November 2, 1989 – April 18, 1991)

==== 1990s ====
- Gatapishi (1990–91)
- Fujio Fujiko A's Mumako (1990)
- 808 Cho Hyori Kewaishi (1990)
- Dororonpa! (1991)
- 21 Emon (May 2, 1991 – March 26, 1992)
- **Crayon Shin-chan** (April 13, 1992 – present)
- Sasurai-kun (1992)
- Manmaru the Ninja Penguin (1997–98)
- Yoshimoto Muchikko Monogatari (1998)
- Weekly Storyland (1999–2001)

==== 2000s ====
- Haré+Guu (2001)
- Atashin'chi (2002–09)
- Ninja Hattori-kun (2004–08)
- **Doraemon** (2005–present)
- Futatsu no Kurumi/Two Walnuts (2007)
- Gokyoudai Monogatari (2009–10)

==== 2010s ====
- Stitch! Best Friends Forever (2010–11, co-produced by Disney)
- The Knight in the Area (2012)
- Ninja Hattori-kun Returns (2013–2015, co-produced with Reliance MediaWorks)
- Here Comes The Black Witch!! (2012–2014)
- My Neighbor Seki (2014)
- The Electric Town's Bookstore (2014)
- Mysterious Joker (2014–2016)
- Trickster (2016, co-produced with TMS Entertainment)
- Shin Atashin'chi (2016)
- The Laughing Salesman NEW (2017)
- Elegant Yokai Apartment Life (2017)
- Pochitto Hatsumei: Pikachin-Kit (2018–2020, co-produced with OLM)
- Teasing Master Takagi-san (2018–2022)
- Barangay 143 (2018–2019, co-produced with ASI Studios, Inc. and credited as TV Asahi)
- Null & Peta (2019)

==== 2020s ====
- The 8th Son? Are You Kidding Me? (2020)
- Kin Daa Terebi (2020, co-produced with Lesprit)
- Super Spy Ryan (2020, Animated segments, co-produced with Sunlight Entertainment and Pocket.watch)
- Pui Pui Molcar / Pui Pui Molcar Driving School (2021–2022, co-produced with Japan Green Hearts)
- Idolls! (2021)
- Those Snow White Notes (2021)
- iii Icecrin (2021–present, co-produced with TIA)
- The World Ends with You the Animation (2021, co-produced with Domerica)
- A Couple of Cuckoos (2022, co-produced with SynergySP)
- Chimimo (2022)
- The Dangers in My Heart (2023–2027)
- Mr. Villain's Day Off (2024, co-produced with SynergySP)
- The Wrong Way to Use Healing Magic (2024, co-produced with Studio Add)
- Rakuten Panda! (2024)
- Milky Subway: The Galactic Limited Express (2025)
- Draw This, Then Die! (2026)

=== Films ===
==== 1980s ====
- Tenguri, Boy of the Plains (December 21, 1977)
- Doraemon: Nobita's Dinosaur (March 15, 1980)
- Doraemon: The Records of Nobita, Spaceblazer (March 14, 1981)
- Kaibutsu-kun: Invitation to Kaibutsu Land (March 14, 1981)
- 21 Emon: Uchū e Irasshai! (August 1, 1981)
- Doraemon: What Am I for Momotaro (August 1, 1981) - short film
- Doraemon: Ken-chan's Adventure (1981) - short film
- Doraemon: Nobita and the Haunts of Evil (March 13, 1982)
- Kaibutsu-kun: The Demon Sword (March 13, 1982)
- Ninja Hattori-kun: Nin Nin Ninpo Enikki no Maki (March 13, 1982)
- Ninja Hattori-kun: Nin Nin Furusato Daisakusen no Maki (March 12, 1983)
- Doraemon: Nobita and the Castle of the Undersea Devil (March 12, 1983)
- Perman: The Birdman Has Arrived!! (March 12, 1983)
- Ninja Hattori-kun + Perman: ESP Wars (March 17, 1984)
- Doraemon: Nobita's Great Adventure into the Underworld (March 17, 1984)
- Doraemon: Nobita's Little Star Wars (March 16, 1985)
- Ninja Hattori-kun + Perman: Ninja Beast Jippō vs. Miracle Egg (March 16, 1985)
- Doraemon: Nobita and the Steel Troops (March 15, 1986)
- Obake no Q-Taro: Tobidase! Bake Bake Daisakusen (March 15, 1986) - short film
- Pro Golfer Saru: Super Golf World e no Chōsen!! (March 15, 1986)
- Pro Golfer Saru: Kōga Hikyō! Kage no Ninpō Golfer Sanjō! (March 14, 1987)
- Obake no Q-Taro: Susume! 1/100 Daisakusen (March 14, 1987) - short film
- Doraemon: Nobita and the Knights on Dinosaurs (March 14, 1987)
- Doraemon: The Record of Nobita's Parallel Visit to the West (March 12, 1988)
- ESPer Mami: Hoshizora no Dancing Doll (March 12, 1988)
- Ultra B: Black Hole kara no Dokusaisha BB!! (March 12, 1988) - short film
- Doraemon: Nobita and the Birth of Japan (March 11, 1989)
- Dorami-chan: Mini-Dora SOS!!! (March 11, 1989) - short film

==== 1990s ====
- Doraemon: Nobita and the Animal Planet (March 10, 1990)
- Chinpui: Eri-sama Katsudō Daishashin (March 10, 1990)
- Doraemon: Nobita's Dorabian Nights (March 9, 1991)
- Dorami-chan: Wow, The Kid Gang of Bandits! (March 9, 1991) - short film
- Doraemon: Nobita and the Kingdom of Clouds (March 7, 1992)
- 21-Emon: To Space! The Barefoot Princess (March 7, 1992)
- In a Thrilling, Solar Car (March 7, 1992) - short film
- Doraemon: Nobita and the Tin Labyrinth (March 6, 1993)
- Dorami-chan: Hello, Dynosis Kids!! (March 6, 1993) - short film
- The Sun Is Our Friend: Hold Out, the Soraemon! (March 6, 1993) - short film
- Crayon Shin-chan: Action Mask vs. Leotard Devil (July 24, 1993)
- Doraemon: Nobita's Three Visionary Swordsmen (March 12, 1994)
- Dorami-chan: A Blue Straw Hat (March 12, 1994) - short film
- Umeboshi Denka: Uchū no Hate kara Panparopan! (March 12, 1994)
- Crayon Shin-chan: The Secret Treasure of Buri Buri Kingdom (April 23, 1994)
- Doraemon: Nobita to Mirai Note (1994)
- Doraemon: Nobita's Diary of the Creation of the World (March 4, 1995)
- 2112: The Birth of Doraemon (March 4, 1995) - short film
- Crayon Shin-chan: Unkokusai's Ambition (April 15, 1995)
- Doraemon: Nobita and the Galaxy Super-express (March 2, 1996)
- Dorami & Doraemons: Robot School's Seven Mysteries (March 2, 1996) - short film
- Crayon Shin-chan: Great Adventure in Henderland (April 13, 1996)
- Doraemon: Nobita and the Spiral City (March 8, 1997)
- The Doraemons: The Puzzling Challenge Letter of the Mysterious Thief Dorapan (March 8, 1997) - short film
- Crayon Shin-chan: Pursuit of the Balls of Darkness (April 19, 1997)
- Doraemon: Nobita's Great Adventure in the South Seas (March 7, 1998)
- Doraemon Comes Back (March 7, 1998) - short film
- The Doraemons: The Great Operating of Stinging Insects! (March 7, 1998) - short film
- Crayon Shin-chan: Blitzkrieg! Pig's Hoof's Secret Mission (April 18, 1998)
- Doraemon: Nobita Drifts in the Universe (March 6, 1999)
- Doraemon: Nobita's the Night Before a Wedding (March 6, 1999) - short film
- The Doraemons: Funny Candy of Okashinana!? (March 6, 1999)
- Crayon Shin-chan: Explosion! The Hot Spring's Feel Good Final Battle (April 17, 1999)

==== 2000s ====
- Doraemon: Nobita and the Legend of the Sun King (March 4, 2000)
- Doraemon: A Grandmother's Recollections (March 4, 2000) - short film
- The Doraemons: Doki Doki Wildcat Engine (March 4, 2000) - short film
- Crayon Shin-chan: Jungle That Invites Storm (April 22, 2000)
- Doraemon: Nobita and the Winged Braves (March 10, 2001)
- Doraemon: Ganbare! Gian!! (March 10, 2001) - short film
- Dorami & Doraemons: Space Land's Critical Event (March 10, 2001)
- Crayon Shin-chan: Fierceness That Invites Storm! The Adult Empire Strikes Back (April 21, 2001)
- Doraemon: Nobita in the Robot Kingdom (March 9, 2002)
- Doraemon: The Day When I Was Born (March 9, 2002) - short film
- The Doraemons: Goal! Goal! Goal!! (March 9, 2002) - short film
- Crayon Shin-chan: Fierceness That Invites Storm! The Battle of the Warring States (April 20, 2002)
- Doraemon: Nobita and the Windmasters (March 8, 2003)
- Pa-Pa-Pa the Movie: Perman (March 8, 2003)
- Crayon Shin-chan: Fierceness That Invites Storm! Yakiniku Road of Honor (April 19, 2003)
- Pa-Pa-Pa the Movie: Perman: Tako de Pon! Ashi wa Pon! (March 6, 2004)
- Doraemon: Nobita in the Wan-Nyan Spacetime Odyssey (March 6, 2004)
- Doraemon's 25th Anniversary (March 6, 2004)
- Crayon Shin-chan: Fierceness That Invites Storm! The Kasukabe Boys of the Evening Sun (April 17, 2004)
- Crayon Shin-chan: The Legend Called Buri Buri 3 Minutes Charge (April 16, 2005)
- Doraemon: Nobita's Dinosaur 2006 (March 4, 2006)
- Crayon Shin-chan: The Legend Called: Dance! Amigo! (April 15, 2006)
- Doraemon: Nobita's New Great Adventure into the Underworld (March 10, 2007)
- Crayon Shin-chan: Fierceness That Invites Storm! The Singing Buttocks Bomb (April 21, 2007)
- Summer Days with Coo (July 28, 2007)
- Doraemon: Nobita and the Green Giant Legend (March 8, 2008)
- Crayon Shin-chan: Fierceness That Invites Storm! The Hero of Kinpoko (April 19, 2008)
- Doraemon the Movie: Nobita's Spaceblazer (March 7, 2009)
- Crayon Shin-chan: Roar! Kasukabe Animal Kingdom (April 18, 2009)

==== 2010s ====
- Doraemon: Nobita's Great Battle of the Mermaid King (March 6, 2010)
- Crayon Shin-chan: Super-Dimension! The Storm Called My Bride (April 17, 2010)
- Doraemon: Nobita and the New Steel Troops—Winged Angels (March 5, 2011)
- Crayon Shin-chan: Fierceness That Invites Storm! Operation Golden Spy (April 16, 2011)
- Doraemon: Nobita and the Island of Miracles—Animal Adventure (March 3, 2012)
- Crayon Shin-chan: Fierceness That Invites Storm! Me and the Space Princess (April 14, 2012)
- Doraemon: Nobita's Secret Gadget Museum (March 9, 2013)
- Crayon Shin-chan: Very Tasty! B-class Gourmet Survival!! (April 20, 2013)
- Doraemon: New Nobita's Great Demon—Peko and the Exploration Party of Five (March 8, 2014)
- Crayon Shin-chan: Intense Battle! Robo Dad Strikes Back (April 19, 2014)
- Stand by Me Doraemon (with Shirogumi and Robot Communications) (August 8, 2014)
- Doraemon: Nobita's Space Heroes (March 7, 2015)
- Crayon Shin-chan: My Moving Story! Cactus Large Attack! (April 18, 2015)
- Doraemon: Nobita and the Birth of Japan 2016 (March 5, 2016)
- Crayon Shin-chan: Fast Asleep! The Great Assault on Dreamy World! (April 16, 2016)
- Doraemon the Movie 2017: Great Adventure in the Antarctic Kachi Kochi (March 4, 2017)
- Crayon Shin-chan: Invasion!! Alien Shiriri (April 15, 2017)
- Doraemon the Movie 2018: Nobita's Treasure Island (March 3, 2018)
- Crayon Shin-chan: Burst Serving! Kung Fu Boys ~Ramen Rebellion~ (April 13, 2018)
- Doraemon the Movie 2019: Nobita's Chronicle of the Moon Exploration (March 1, 2019)
- Crayon Shin-chan: Honeymoon Hurricane ~The Lost Hiroshi~ (April 19, 2019)

==== 2020s ====
- Doraemon: Nobita's New Dinosaur (August 7, 2020)
- Crayon Shin-chan: Crash! Rakuga Kingdom and Almost Four Heroes (September 11, 2020)
- Stand by Me Doraemon 2 (November 20, 2020)
- Crayon Shin-chan: Shrouded in Mystery! The Flowers of Tenkazu Academy (July 30, 2021)
- Doraemon: Nobita's Little Star Wars 2021 (March 4, 2022)
- Teasing Master Takagi-san: The Movie (June 10, 2022)
- Doraemon: Nobita's Sky Utopia (March 3, 2023)
- New Dimension! Crayon Shin-chan the Movie: Battle of Supernatural Powers ~Flying Sushi~ (August 4, 2023)
- Totto-Chan: The Little Girl at the Window (December 8, 2023)
- Doraemon: Nobita's Earth Symphony (March 1, 2024)
- Ghost Cat Anzu (July 19, 2024) (co-production with Miyu Productions)
- Crayon Shin-chan the Movie: Our Dinosaur Diary (August 9, 2024)
- Ryan's World the Movie: Titan Universe Adventure (August 16, 2024) (animated segments)
- Doraemon: Nobita's Art World Tales (March 7, 2025)
- Crayon Shin-chan the Movie: Super Magnificent! Scorching Kasukabe Dancers (August 8, 2025)
- Toritsukare Otoko (November 7, 2025)
- Peleliu: Guernica of Paradise (December 5, 2025) (co-production with Fugaku)
- Milky Subway: The Galactic Limited Express: Local Train to the Theater (February 6, 2026)
- The Dangers in My Heart: The Movie (February 13, 2026)
- Doraemon: New Nobita and the Castle of the Undersea Devil (February 27, 2026)
- Crayon Shin-chan the Movie: Spooky! My Yokai Vacation (July 31, 2026)
- Doraemon: Nobita's Steam-Powered Time Machine (March 5, 2027)

=== Television specials ===
- Doraemon's Time Capsule for 2001 (January 1, 1980)
- Dora・Q・Perman (April 8, 1980)
- Doraemon Meets Hattori the Ninja (January 3, 1982)
- Kaibutsu-kun: Hiroshi's Betrayal (April 3, 1982)
- Pro Golfer Saru (October 9, 1982)
- Doraemon: Europe Rail Travel (October 18, 1983)
- Sangokushi (March 20, 1985)
- Mr. Pen Pen (March 31, 1986)
- Doraemon: Summer Holiday (April 4, 1986)
- Sangokushi II: Amakakeru Otokotachi (August 22, 1986)
- Mr. Pen Pen II (December 29, 1986)
- Doraemon and Itchy the Stray (January 2, 1987)
- Doraemon: Treasure of the Shinugumi Mountain (August 12, 1988)
- Fujiko Fujio A no Mumako (July 3, 1990)
- Oishinbo: Kyūkyoku Tai Shikō, Chōju Ryōri Taiketsu!! (December 11, 1992)
- The Laughing Salesman Special (December 26, 1992)
- Doraemon: Featherplace (April 2, 1993)
- Oishinbo: Nichibei Kome Sensō (December 3, 1993)
- The Laughing Salesman: Supersize Spring Issue (April 6, 1993)
- The Laughing Salesman: Supersize Forgotten Year Issue (December 28, 1993)
- Tamio Kageyama's Double Fantasy (January 2, 1994)
- Tatsuya Nakazaki's Super Gag Theater (January 16 - August 21, 1994)
- Sensō Dōwa (August 15, 2002 - August 13, 2009)
- Shiroi Koibito (December 23, 2006)
- Stitch and the Planet of Sand (June 16, 2012)
- Stitch! Perfect Memory (August 7, 2015)
