= Crayon Shin-chan the Movie: Super Hot! The Spicy Kasukabe Dancers =

2025 Japanese animated film

- Theatrical release poster

Japanese name
- Kanji: 映画クレヨンしんちゃん 超華麗！灼熱のカスカベダンサーズ
Transcriptions
- Revised Hepburn: Eiga Kureyon Shin-chan Chō Karē! Shakunetsu no Kasukabe Dansāzu
- Directed by: Masakazu Hashimoto
- Screenplay by: Kimiko Ueno
- Based on: Crayon Shin-chan by Yoshito Usui
- Starring: Yumiko Kobayashi; Miki Narahashi; Satomi Kōrogi; Toshiyuki Morikawa; Kento Kaku; Viking
- Production company: Shin-Ei Animation
- Distributed by: Toho
- Release date: 8 August 2025
- Running time: 105 minutes
- Country: Japan
- Language: Japanese

Crayon Shin-chan the Movie: Super Hot! The Spicy Kasukabe Dancers (Note: Japanese: 映画クレヨンしんちゃん 超華麗！灼熱のカスカベダンサーズ, Hepburn: Eiga Kureyon Shin-chan Chō Karei! Shakunetsu no Kasukabe Dansāzu) is a Japanese animated film produced by Shin-Ei Animation. It is overall the 33rd film and 32nd 2D animated film of the anime series Crayon Shin-chan which released on August 8, 2025. The film is set in India.

== Cast ==
- Yumiko Kobayashi as Shinnosuke "Shin-chan" Nohara
- Miki Narahashi as Misae Nohara, Shin-chan's mother
- Toshiyuki Morikawa as Hiroshi Nohara, Shin-chan's father
- Satomi Kōrogi as Himawari Nohara, Shin-chan's younger sister
- Mari Mashiba as Tōru Kazama and Shiro
- Tamao Hayashi as Nene Sakurada
- Teiyū Ichiryūsai as Masao Sato
- Chie Satō as Bo-chan
- Kento Kaku as Wolf

== Plot ==
To celebrate a newly formed sister-city relationship between Kasukabe and the city of Musibai (a parody on the name Mumbai) in the fictional Indian state of Hagasimil, a Kids Entertainment Festival is held. Shinnosuke (Shin-chan) and his friends—Kazama, Masao, Nene, and Bo-chan—form a dance team, win the local competition, and are rewarded with a trip to India to perform on stage. Accompanied by the Nohara family, the enthusiastic group sets off to experience the vibrant, spicy culture and bustling streets of India. While exploring the local sightseeing spots and a mysterious general store, Shinnosuke and the quiet, rock-collecting Bo-chan stumble upon an antique shop. Inside, they pick up a bizarre backpack shaped like a large human nose. Unbeknownst to them, the bag holds a dark, dormant, tyrannical power. When Bo-chan accidentally pokes his nose with strange paper pulled from the backpack, he becomes possessed by this evil force. He transforms into a rampaging alter ego, causing chaos that threatens the entire world. With Bo-chan wreaking havoc, the Kasukabe Defense Force is forced to jump into action. They team up with three Indian locals—Ariana, Kabir, and Dill—to get to the bottom of the backpack's curse. The friends must balance their classic comedic antics and dance moves with genuine fantasy adventure to snap Bo-chan out of his possession and defeat the terrifying tyrant.

== Production ==
This film is the 33rd film of the anime series Crayon Shin-chan. The film was directed by Masakazu Hashimoto, while the script was written by Kimiko Ueno. Danger Zone sang by Toshiyuki Morikawa as Hiroshi Nohara. a Parody from Top Gun.

== Release ==
The film premiered in Japan on 8 August 2025. The film was distributed in Japan by Toho and saw releases in other territories via local distributors. An international theatrical release followed, with an Indian theatrical release titled Shin-chan: The Spicy Kasukabe Dancers in India on 26 September 2025 released in multiple regional languages.

== See also ==
- List of Crayon Shin-chan films
