= Kukunochi =

Japanese deity

Genealogy
- Parents: Izanagi (father); Izanami (mother)

Kukunochi (久久能智神 – Tree Trunk Elder) is the kami of trees, the kami is also called Ki-no-kami, or Kuku-no-shi. He is the brother of Ōyamatsumi, Shimatsuhiko, and Watatsumi.

It is possible Kukunochi was originally a tama that dwelled in trees. Kukunochi is found in older records. Along with Toyoukehime this kami is considered a yafunegami.

Many versions state he was born from Izanami and Izanagi, while others state he is the son of Shinatsuhiko.

He is worshipped today on the occasion of roof raising ceremonies and the blessing of new houses.
