= Mashin Creator Wataru =

Japanese anime television series

- Promotional poster

Japanese name
- Kana: 魔神創造伝ワタル
Transcriptions
- Revised Hepburn: Mashin Sōzōden Wataru
- Genre: Adventure; Comedy; Isekai; Mecha
- Created by: Hajime Yatate
- Developed by: Yoichi Kato
- Directed by: Yumi Kamakura
- Voices of: Mutsumi Tamura; Atsumi Tanezaki; Katsuyuki Konishi; Megu Umezawa; Rie Kugimiya; Aoi Ichikawa; Shunichi Toki; Tomokazu Sugita
- Music by: Ryūichi Takada; Keiichi Hirokawa; Oliver Good; Keita Inoue
- Country of origin: Japan
- Original language: Japanese
- No. of episodes: 24

Production
- Producers: Takuya Okamoto; Toshihiro Maeda
- Animator: BN Pictures
- Production companies: Bandai Namco Filmworks; TV Tokyo

Original release
- Network: TXN (TV Tokyo)
- Release: January 12 – June 22, 2025

Related
- Mashin Hero Wataru

Mashin Creator Wataru (Japanese: 魔神創造伝ワタル, Hepburn: Mashin Sōzōden Wataru; lit. "Magic God Creation Legend Wataru") is a 2025 anime television series produced by BN Pictures. It is the 5th TV entry in Sunrise's Mashin Hero Wataru series, serving as a reboot and starring its own incarnation of Wataru and aired on TV Tokyo and its affiliates from January 12 to June 22, 2025.

== Story ==
Protagonist Wataru Hoshibe, an elementary school student in fourth grade, is a RyuTuber who wants to become a superstar. His adventure begins in the Chubukai parallel world alongside Ryujinmaru, a Mashin Wataru created out of blocks to defeat the final boss, Enjoda!

== Characters ==
=== Main ===
Wataru Hoshibe (星部 ワタル, Hoshibe Wataru)
Voiced by: Mutsumi Tamura
Ryujinmaru (龍神丸, Ryūjinmaru) / Ryujin (龍神, Ryūjin)
Voiced by: Tomokazu Sugita
Kakeru Amabe (天部カケル, Amabe Kakeru)
Voiced by: Atsumi Tanezaki
Offline (御富良院, Ofurain)
Voiced by: Katsuyuki Konishi
Maro (マロ, Maro)
Voiced by: Megu Umezawa
Ryun Ryun (リュンリュン, Ryunryun)
Voiced by: Rie Kugimiya
Uzume (ウズメ, Uzume) / Uzumemaru (ウズメ丸, Uzumemaru)
Voiced by: Atsumi Tanezaki
Sho (ショウ, Shou)
Voiced by: Aoi Ichikawa
Mygah (マイガー, Maigā)
Voiced by: Shunichi Toki

== Production ==
The series was announced by Bandai Namco Filmworks on January 13, 2024. The series was directed by Yumi Kamakura with Yoichi Kato handling series composition, Mayuko Nakano and Yoshinori Yumoto designing the characters and music being composed by Ryūichi Takada, Keiichi Hirokawa, Oliver Good and Keita Inoue. Bandai Namco Pictures animates the series while BNF and TV Tokyo handle production duties.

Medialink licensed the series in Asia-Pacific, with episodes streaming on their Ani-One Asia YouTube Channel the same day they premiere in Japan.

== Episodes ==
The series uses 3 main pieces of theme music, 2 opening themes and 1 ending theme. The opening for the first 12 episodes of the series is "POP UP!" by lol, with it being replaced from episode 13 onwards with "Sō" by SANTA. The ending theme is "Pocket" by FANTASTICS from EXILE TRIBE.

| No. | Title | Directed by | Written by | Original release date |
|---|---|---|---|---|
| 1 | "【The Savior is a RyuTuber】Wataru Hoshibe has Arrived!"; Transliteration: "【Kyuseishu wa Ryutuber】 Hishibe Wataru ga Futtekita!" (Japanese: 【救世主はRyuTuber】星部ワタルがふってきた！) | Yumi Kamakura | Yoichi Kato | January 12, 2025 |
On a stormy night, Wataru Hoshibe and his cousin Kakeru Amabe prepare to livestream on their RyuTube channel, when they are suddenly pulled into, and get separated in the parallel world of Chubukai.
| 2 | "【Here Comes Fuujinmaru】Offline's Forehead is in Danger!"; Transliteration: "【Fūjinmaru Kenzan】 Odeko ga Pinchi no Ofurain!" (Japanese: 【風神丸見参】おでこがピンチの御富良院！) | Harume Kosaka | Yoichi Kato | January 19, 2025 |
| 3 | "【A Big Revelation】Uncovering Maro!"; Transliteration: "【Dai Bakuro】 Maro no Nazo o Sagure!" (Japanese: 【大暴露】マロの謎をさぐれ！) | Yasuhiro Minami, Reiko Nozaki | Yoichi Kato | January 26, 2025 |
| 4 | "【Prank】Reuniting with Kakeru!?"; Transliteration: "【Dokkiri】 Kakeru to no Saikai!?" (Japanese: 【ドッキリ】カケルとの再会！？) | Naoki Kusaka | Yoichi Kato | February 2, 2025 |
| 5 | "【Jumping to the End】Heading to Enjoda's Hideout!"; Transliteration: "【Byō de Saishūkai】 Enjōda no Ajito ni Sanjōda!" (Japanese: 【秒で最終回】エンジョーダのアジトに参上だ！) | Akira Kato | Deko Akao | February 9, 2025 |
| 6 | "【Urgent Apology】Ryun Ryun's Dark Past!?"; Transliteration: "【Kinkyū Shazai】 Ryun Ryun no Kuro Rekishi! ?" (Japanese: 【緊急謝罪】リュンリュンの黒歴史！？) | Satoshi Toba | Toshizo Nemoto | February 16, 2025 |
| 7 | "【Survival】Will Kakeru and Friends Pull Through?"; Transliteration: "【Sabaibaru】 Kakeru-tachi wa dō ikiru ka" (Japanese: 【サバイバル】カケルたちはどう生きるか) | Gahi Imu | Takamitsu Kohno | February 23, 2025 |
| 8 | "【Viewer Discretion Advised】Let's Go to the Haunted House!"; Transliteration: "【Etsuran Chūi】 Yūrei Yashiki e Rettsugō!" (Japanese: 【閲覧注意】幽霊屋敷へレッツゴー！) | Mamoru Enomoto | Toshizo Nemoto | March 2, 2025 |
| 9 | "【Compilation】Offline is Such a Traitor!"; Transliteration: "【Kirinuki】 Ofurain ga Uragirimono Sugita!" (Japanese: 【切り抜き】御富良院が裏切り者すぎた！) | Yasuhiro Minami, Reiko Nozaki | Deko Akao | March 9, 2025 |
| 10 | "【Lifetime Version】100 Ways to Spot a Lie!?"; Transliteration: "【Eikiyuu Hozon-ban】 Uso o Miyaburu 100 no Hōhō! ?" (Japanese: 【永久保存版】ウソを見破る100の方法！？) | Naoki Kusaka | Takamitsu Kohno | March 16, 2025 |
| 11 | "【Real Betrayal】What Will Kakeru Do!"; Transliteration: "【Gachi Uragiri】 Dousuru Kakeru!" (Japanese: 【ガチ裏切り】どうするカケル！) | Akira Toba | Toshizo Nemoto | March 23, 2025 |
| 12 | "【Must-See Recipe】Obtaining the Great Power of God!"; Transliteration: "【Hikken Reshipi】 Ouinaru Kami no Chikara o te ni Irero!" (Japanese: 【必見レシピ】大いなる神の力を手に入れろ！) | Toshikazu Yoshizawa, Youhei Shindou | Toshizo Nemoto | March 30, 2025 |
| 13 | "【Mashin Remodeling】It Became Unfixable After Dismantling LOL"; Transliteration: "【Mashin Kaizō】 Bunkai Shitara Naoranaku Natta Kudan www" (Japanese: 【魔神改造】分解したら直らなくなった件www) | Akira Kato | Yoichi Kato | April 6, 2025 |
| 14 | "【Maro's How-To】You Too Can Be a Popular RyuTuber!"; Transliteration: "【Maro-ryū Hautsū】 Kore de Kimi mo Ninki RyuTuber!" (Japanese: 【マロ流ハウツー】これでキミも人気RyuTuber！) | Mamoru Enomoto | Deko Akao | April 13, 2025 |
| 15 | "【Impersonation Makeup】Maro is Maro and Maro is Maroron"; Transliteration: "【Mono Mane Meiku】 Maro ga Maro de Maro wa Maroron" (Japanese: 【ものまねメイク】マロがマロでマロはマロロン) | Naoki Kusaka | Takamitsu Kohno | April 20, 2025 |
| 16 | "【Highly Effective】Everybody One-Two! Ultimate Training!"; Transliteration: "【Kikime Batsugun】 Min'na de Wantsū! Saikyō-kin Tore!" (Japanese: 【効き目抜群】みんなでワンツー！最強筋トレ！) | Masatoshi Hakata | Toshizo Nemoto | April 27, 2025 |
| 17 | "【Hell】Intense!? Penalty Game Full of Traps!"; Transliteration: "【Jigoku】 Dokkidoki! ? Wana-darake no Batsu Gēmu Taikai!" (Japanese: 【地獄】ドッキドキ！？ワナだらけの罰ゲーム大会！) | Akira Toba | Deko Akao | May 4, 2025 |
| 18 | "【Divine Episode】Asking for the Secret of the World!"; Transliteration: "【Kami-kai】 Sekai no Himitsu o Oshiemasu!" (Japanese: 【神回】世界のヒミツを教えます！) | Yasuhiro Minami, Reiko Nozaki | Yoichi Kato | May 11, 2025 |
| 19 | "【A Brief Explanation】The Creation of Offline"; Transliteration: "【Zakkuri Kaisetsu】 Ofurain no Dekiru Made Toka" (Japanese: 【ざっくり解説】御富良院のできるまでとか) | Takahide Ogata | Yoichi Kato | May 18, 2025 |
| 20 | "【A Battle of Manliness】A Manly Showdown Between Men!"; Transliteration: "【Kan no Otokogi Batoru】 Otoko to Otoko no Otoko Shōbu!" (Japanese: 【漢の男気バトル】オトコとオトコのオトコ勝負！) | Akira Kato | Toshizo Nemoto | May 25, 2025 |
| 21 | "【An Emotional Reunion!?】The Search for Susanoo!"; Transliteration: "【Kandō no Saikai! ?】 Susanō o Sagase!" (Japanese: 【感動の再会！？】スサノオをさがせ！) | Mamoru Enomoto | Toshizo Nemoto | June 1, 2025 |
| 22 | "【Serious Match】Hit Them All or You Can't Go Home!"; Transliteration: "【Gachi Shōbu】 Zenbu Atenakya Kaere Ma 7!" (Japanese: 【ガチ勝負】ぜんぶ当てなきゃ帰れま7！) | Norihiko Sudo | Deko Akao | June 8, 2025 |
| 23 | "【Bad News】A Burning World and A Sudden Parting"; Transliteration: "【Hihō】 Moeru Sekai to Totsuzen no Wakare" (Japanese: 【悲報】燃える世界と突然のわかれ) | Toshikazu Yoshizawa | Takamitsu Kohno | June 15, 2025 |
| 24 | "【The Two Saviors】Let's Create! Our Bright Future!"; Transliteration: "【Futari wa Kyūseishu】 Tsukure! Ore-tachi no Kagayaku Mirai!" (Japanese: 【二人は救世主】創れ！オレたちの輝く未来！) | Yumi Karakura | Yoichi Kato | June 22, 2025 |
