= Chimimo =

Japanese anime television series

- Key visual

ちみも
- Genre: Comedy
- Created by: Kanahei; Shin-Ei Animation
- Manga
- Written by: Tsutsumi Mai
- Published by: Shueisha
- Original run: June 6, 2022 – present
- Volumes: 1
- Anime television series
- Directed by: Pino Aruto
- Written by: Kimiko Ueno
- Music by: Yashikin
- Studio: Shin-Ei Animation
- Licensed by: Sentai Filmworks
- Original network: TV Tokyo, BS Asahi
- Original run: July 7, 2022 – September 30, 2022
- Episodes: 12

Chimimo (ちみも) is an original Japanese anime television series animated by Shin-Ei Animation with cooperation by M2 Animation and DeeDee Animation Studio and directed by Pino Aruto. It is written by Kimiko Ueno, with Yashikin composing the music. It aired from July to September 2022 on TV Tokyo and BS Asahi.

== Characters ==
Mutsumi Onigami (鬼神むつみ, Onigami Mutsumi)
Voiced by: Mamiko Noto
Mei Onigami (鬼神めい, Onigami Mei)
Voiced by: Yuria Kōzuki
Hazuki Onigami (鬼神はづき, Onigami Hazuki)
Voiced by: Ai Kakuma
Jigoku-san (地獄さん)
Voiced by: Junichi Suwabe

== Media ==
=== Manga ===
A four-panel manga adaptation, written and illustrated by Tsutsumi Mai, began serialization online via Twitter and Instagram on June 26, 2022. It has been collected in a single tankōbon volume by Shueisha as of September 2022.

=== Anime ===
The original anime television series was announced on January 31, 2022. Pino Aruto is directing the anime at Shin-Ei Animation, with M2 Animation and DeeDee Animation Studio cooperating the animation, Takashi Aoshima writing the scripts, and Yasuhiro Misawa composing the music. Original character designs are provided by Kanahei, while Mai Tsutsumi adapts the designs for animation. The series aired from July 7 to September 30, 2022, on TV Tokyo and BS Asahi. The opening theme song is "Marukoppa" by Chiaki Mayumura, while the ending theme song is "Nanda Nannan da!" by Mikako Komatsu. Sentai Filmworks has licensed the series.
