= Shinatsuhiko =

Japanese mythological god of wind

Genealogy
- Parents: Izanagi (father); Izanami (mother)

Shinatsuhiko (Kojiki: 志那都比古神 - Long Blowing Lad, Nihon Shoki: 級長津彦命) is a Japanese mythological god of wind (Fūjin). Another name for this deity is Shinatobe, who may originally have been a separate goddess of wind.

== Sources ==
The Nihon Shoki stated that Shinatsuhiko was born after Izanagi no Mikoto and Izanami no Mikoto created the great eight islands of Japan. After these lands were completed, Izanagi blew at the morning mists that obscured them and these became Shinatsuhiko, God of the Wind.

A Shinto liturgical text or ritual incantation called norito addressed the god in this masculine name while a different name – Shinatobe – was ascribed to what is presumed to be his feminine version.

Some sources also called the wind deities Ame no Mihashira (pillar of Heaven) and Kuni no Mihashira (pillar of the Earth/Country) according to the belief that the wind supported the sky. It is noted that these names preceded Shinatsuhiko and Shinatobe.

== Shrines ==
The Ise Grand Shrine contains temples, the Kaze-no-Miya (wind shrines), that hold betsugū (detached shrines) which enshrine the Shinatsuhiko-no-Mikoto and Shinatobe-no-Mikoto. In Yūtō, Shizuoka, the Oki-jinja Shrine is also dedicated to Shinatsuhiko-kami.
