= Crayon Shin-chan (TV series) =

Japanese anime television series

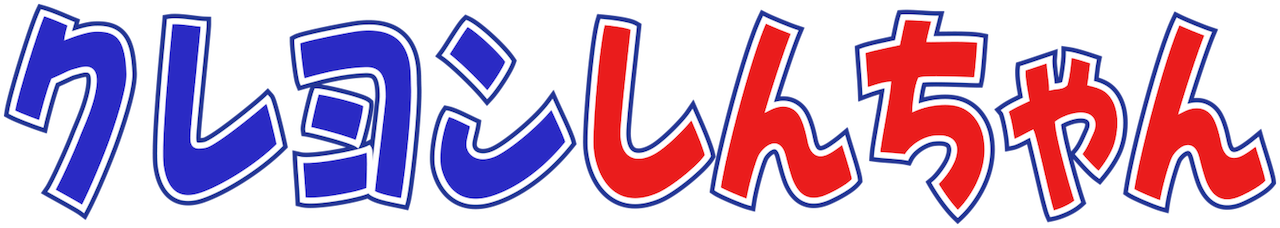
- クレヨンしんちゃん
- Genre: Comedy, slice of life
- Based on: Crayon Shin-chan by Yoshito Usui
- Directed by: Mitsuru Hongo (#1–202); Keiichi Hara (#202–504); Yuji Muto (#505–1328); Wataru Takahashi (#1329–present)
- Voices of: Akiko Yajima (1992–2018); Yumiko Kobayashi (2018–present); Keiji Fujiwara (1992–2016); Toshiyuki Morikawa (2016–present); Miki Narahashi; Satomi Kōrogi; Mari Mashiba
- Music by: Toshiyuki Arakawa
- Country of origin: Japan
- Original language: Japanese
- No. of episodes: 1,358 (list of episodes)

Production
- Production companies: TV Asahi; ADK Emotions (Note: Previously credited as Asatsu from 1992–1999 and Asatsu-DK from 1999–2019); Shin-Ei Animation

Original release
- Network: ANN (TV Asahi)
- Release: April 13, 1992 – present

Crayon Shin-chan (Japanese: クレヨンしんちゃん, Hepburn: Kureyon Shin-chan; also titled internationally as Shin-Chan) is a Japanese anime comedy television series based on the manga series of the same name by Yoshito Usui. Produced by Shin-Ei Animation, the series follows the life of Shinnosuke Nohara, his family and his friends around the town of Kasukabe, Saitama and other locations. Most episodes were adapted from the manga but similar to ongoing shows such as Doraemon at that time, the show later processed into its own original stories which mostly included specials.

The series premiered on TV Asahi and its affiliates on April 13, 1992, leading to tie-in media being produced such as toys, video games, merchandise, a movie series, an eventual non-canon CGI movie, a spin-off live-action film and its success paved the way for the show to be exported to over 85 countries and its international success led to spin-offs such as Crayon Shin-chan Spin-off, Super Shiro and Style of Hiroshi Nohara's Lunch to be produced.

== Cast ==
Character	Japanese voice actor	English voice actor (TV Asahi/Lacey, Vitello Productions, 2002)	English voice actor (TV Asahi/Lacey, Media Concepts, 2004)	English voice actor (Funimation/TV Asahi, 2006)	English voice actor (Luk Internacional, Red Angel Media, 2016)
Shinnosuke Nohara	Akiko Yajima (1992-2018) Yumiko Kobayashi (2018–present)	Kath Soucie	Diane Michelle	Laura Bailey	Jessica de Borja
Misae Nohara	Miki Narahashi	Kath Soucie	Julie Maddalena	Cynthia Cranz	Candice Moore
Hiroshi Nohara	Keiji Fujiwara (1992-2016) Toshiyuki Morikawa (2016-present)	Eric Loomis	Peter Doyle	Chuck Huber	Michael C. Pizzuto
Himawari Nohara	Satomi Kōrogi	Russi Taylor		Colleen Clinkenbeard	Catherine Fu
Shiro	Mari Mashiba	Russi Taylor	Michael Sorich	Chris Cason	

== Production and release ==
The series aired on TV Asahi and its affiliates since April 13, 1992. The series was originally directed by Mitsuru Hongo from 1992 to 1996, and was replaced by Keiichi Hara from 1996 to 2004, Yuji Muto from 2004–2026 and Wataru Takahashi from 2026 onwards. The series was originally going to conclude in 1994 and have its time-slot replaced by a remake of Umeboshi Denka from the same studio. However, as the series became a huge hit in the ratings on TV Asahi, the network decided not to replace it, leading to said adaptation being scrapped with only a theatrical pilot film being completed and released. On August 22, 2018, TV Asahi announced that both Crayon Shin-chan and Doraemon would move from the 2003–2018 Friday night timeslot to the Saturday afternoon Anime Time block starting on October 5 of that year. Following that, the show gained a major format revamp with episode rebroadcast segments being introduced with its audio re-recorded with the show's current voice cast and several edits.

=== Casting ===
From the show's debut until she stepped down in 2018, Akiko Yajima voiced the titular character Shinnosuke Nohara until she departed from the role due to difficulties of processing the voice of the character. She was replaced by Yumiko Kobayashi that same year. Toshiyuki Morikawa took over Hiroshi Nohara as his original voice actor, Keiji Fujiwara, stepped down from the role in 2016 due to health problems, preluding his death in 2020. Miki Narahashi and Mari Mashiba had voiced Misae Nohara and Shiro respectively since the show's debut in 1992, Mashiba also voices Toru Kazama, a classmate at Shin's school and one of the members of the Kasukabe Defense Force. Since her debut in 1996, Satomi Kōrogi has been voicing Himawari Nohara.

=== International releases ===
An English subtitled version of Crayon Shin-chan ran on KIKU in Hawaii from December 18, 1993, until December 2001 when Lacey Entertainment acquired the rights. The episodes were translated by Karlton Tomomitsu.

The series was first dubbed into English by Vitello Productions in Burbank, California through 2001–2002, when TV Asahi and Lacey Entertainment decided to market the series worldwide. During the early 2000s, it ran on Fox Kids (and later Jetix) in the United Kingdom, on Fox Kids in Australia, on Channel i in Singapore and on RTÉ Two in the Republic of Ireland. Subtitled versions also aired on Stöd 2 in Iceland and on Arutz HaYeladim in Israel. RTÉ Two has not shown the series since 2005, and on Jetix UK, the series was eventually relegated to shorts in-between programs, as a slot-filler. The dub is of American origin, with veteran voice actors such as Kath Soucie, Russi Taylor, Grey DeLisle, Pat Fraley, Eric Loomis and Anndi McAfee playing the characters. Soucie voiced Shin and Misae.

Funimation (now Crunchyroll, LLC) acquired the Shin-chan North America license in 2006. As per all international licenses for the series, TV Asahi remained a licensing partner for North America.

The first 52 episodes of the dub aired on Adult Swim. All three seasons, 26 episodes per season, have also been released on DVD. Season 3, released in 2011, culminated in the official finale, effectively ending the Funimation series.

On August 9, 2025, it was announced the FUNimation English dub will be released on Blu-ray by Discotek Media.

A fourth English dub of Crayon Shin-chan has been produced in Hong Kong by Red Angel Media in 2015 and was commissioned by LUK Internacional, the company that produces the Spanish, Portuguese, the second Italian and the second French dubs of Crayon Shin-chan and commissioned the Doraemon dub that aired on Boomerang UK. The dub was translated from LUK Internacional's Spanish dub, which is close to the Japanese original and has no censorship. The first three volumes of the dub were released in the European and South African Nintendo 3DS eShop on December 22, 2016, and the fourth and fifth volumes were released on December 29, 2016. The dub is separated into five volumes, with the first volume being free while the other four cost €1.99/£1.79. The first volume contains two episodes while the other four contain 6 episodes each which makes 26 episodes in total.

In India, Hindi dubs of the anime started airing on Hungama TV on June 19, 2006. Later, it also began airing in Tamil and Telugu dubs. In 2024, Sony YAY! also started airing the Hindi dub, also providing dubbed versions in Bengali, Tamil & Telugu. As of 2025, all films have been dubbed in Hindi, Tamil, and Telugu, and have aired on Hungama TV and Sony YAY!.

The series, which is licensed in Spain by LUK Internacional, made its first airing there on April 23, 2001, coinciding with the launch of K3. Gradually, the series premiered on other autonomous stations and, in 2004, made it to national television, on Antena 3 and Cartoon Network.

=== Crossovers and promotions ===
A special crossover series titled ''Kamen Rider Fourze x Crayon Shin-chan'' was aired in April 2012 featuring Shin-chan and Kamen Rider Fourze to promote Crayon Shin-chan: Fierceness That Invites Storm! Me and the Space Princess. On 2016 an animated crossover episode with Godzilla was broadcast in Japan. The Sanrio character Hello Kitty appeared in the first Reiwa-era episode of Crayon Shin-chan.

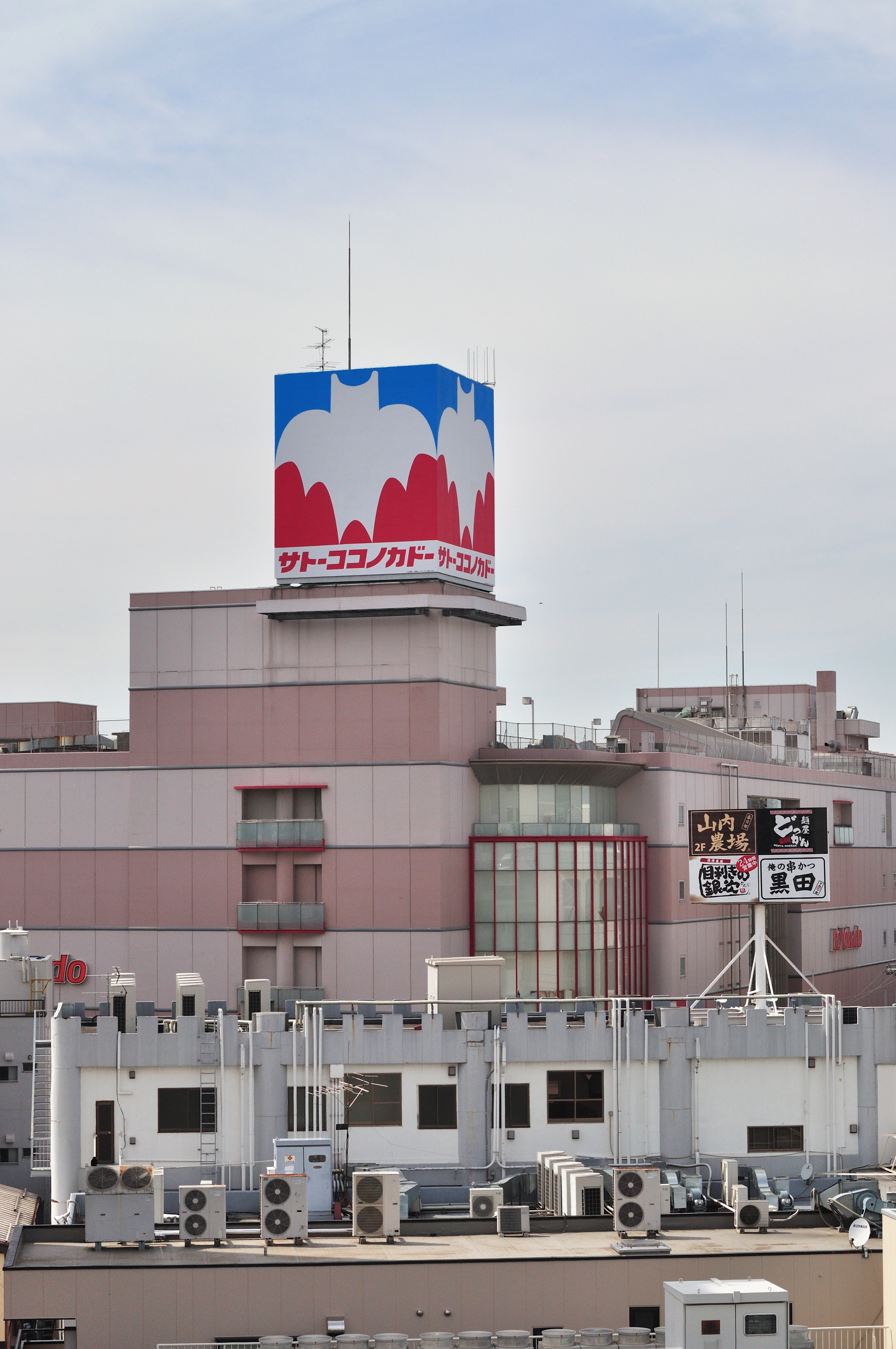
The Ito-Yokado store in Kasukabe displaying the fictional Satō Kokonokadō branding in 2017.

In April 2017, the Ito-Yokado store in Kasukabe temporarily adopted the name and signage of Satō Kokonokadō (サトーココノカドー), a fictional retailer that appears repeatedly in Crayon Shin-chan, as part of the television anime's 25th-anniversary celebrations. The Kasukabe store had served as the model for the fictional location. Shin-chan appeared as the store's manager for one day, and TV Asahi reported that approximately twice the usual number of visitors attended on April 9.

On 23 November 2018, Arashi member Masaki Aiba appeared at the end of episode 983, as his character Tatsuya Kōenji from the drama Sakanoue Animal Clinic Story, in a short called Ora to Shippo to Kagurazaka dazo, where he examines Shinnosuke's dog at the veterinary clinic.

A collaboration with Toei Animation's Wonderful PreCure! began with episode 1233 of Shin Chan on May 18, 2024, followed by episode 16 of Wonderful PreCure the following day.

== Music ==
The music for the series is composed by Toshiyuki Arakawa.

== Other media ==
=== Films ===
There are, as of July 2026, 35 movies overall, 33 in 2D, 1 in 3DCG and 1 in live-action. The 7th 2D film included an 11 minute short.

A live-action film titled Ballad: Song of a Nameless Love, based on the 2002 film, was released in 2009, with the live action film's Kawakami family being the equivalent of the anime's Nohara family.

=== Segments and spin-offs ===
A spin-off titled SHIN-MEN which is set in a parallel world consisting of 13 episodes aired from November 26, 2010, to September 14, 2012, within the show's main timeslot.

Another spin-off series called Crayon Shin-chan Gaiden consisting of four volumes is exclusively streaming on Amazon Prime Video worldwide with English, German, Spanish, French, Italian and Portuguese subtitles.

An anime spin-off series titled Super Shiro was announced on February 3, 2019. The spin-off focuses on Shin-chan's dog Shiro. The series was directed by Masaaki Yuasa and animated at Science Saru. Kimiko Ueno handled series composition, while Tomohisa Shimoyama served as chief director. TV Asahi, Shin-Ei Animation, ADK EM, and Futabasha produced the anime. The series ran for 48 episodes, with each episode being five minutes long. The series premiered on October 14, 2019, on AbemaTV. An English dub premiered on Cartoon Network in Australia and Southeast Asia.

Another spin-off titled Freestyle Shin-chan: The Rappers of Kasukabe aired within the show's main timeslot from January 8, 2022, to June 22, 2024.

Another spin-off titled Nohara Hiroshi Hirumeshi no Ryūgi premiered in October 2025.

== Controversies ==
A Portuguese dub of the anime has also aired on Biggs, with the segment of the 165th episode "Dad's Hospitalized Life" causing major controversy in December 2016, due to a scene where the nurses examine Shinnosuke's anus, and compliment it, all while he acts and looks uncomfortable. Due to complaints from parents over concerns that the show was promoting softcore child pornography, the Portuguese Media Regulatory Authority ordered that the show should only be aired after 10:30 PM. Eventually, the show was slowly faded out of Biggs' schedule, and from Portuguese television. Later, the show returned to television through Portugal's Fox Comedy in June 2021, though on a limited run, with the show being removed from Fox Comedy Portugal after a few months.

The same episode would later be uploaded to the officially run YouTube channel for the series' Portuguese dub, with the controversial scene completely cut out.

Regulators from Indonesia, Vietnam and South Korea have also described the show as 'borderline pornography'. In Brazil, the former mayor of the city of Rio de Janeiro, Cesar Maia, issued a decree on February 24, 2002, calling for the removal of the series, which was being aired on Fox Kids at the time, labeling it incompatible with children's development and arguing that it should be disqualified.

== Merchandise ==
As of March 2021, Bandai Namco has sold 227.02 million Crayon Shin-chan Chocobi food packs.
