= Shin-chan =

Fictional protagonist of Crayon Shin-chan

Shinnosuke Nohara
- Crayon Shin-chan character
- Shin-chan as he appears in the Crayon Shin-chan anime series
- First appearance: Weekly Manga Action (1990)
- Created by: Yoshito Usui
- Voiced by (Japanese): Akiko Yajima (1992–2018); Yumiko Kobayashi (2018–present)
- Voiced by (English): Kath Soucie (Vitello); Diane Michelle (Phuuz); Laura Bailey (Funimation); Jessica de Borja (Red Angel Media); Gil Jopling (Shin-chan Spin-off)

In-universe information
- Nickname: Shin-chan
- Gender: Male
- Occupation: Kindergarten student
- Family: Nohara family
- Nationality: Japanese

Shinnosuke Nohara (野原 しんのすけ, Nohara Shinnosuke), commonly known as Shin-chan (しんちゃん), is the title character and protagonist of Yoshito Usui's manga series Crayon Shin-chan. He is depicted as a five-year-old kindergarten student from Kasukabe, Saitama, and as the eldest child of Hiroshi and Misae Nohara. The original manga began serialization in Weekly Manga Action in 1990, followed by the anime television series in 1992.

Shin-chan is characterized by his carefree behaviour, disruptive humour, attraction to older women, love of the fictional superhero Action Mask, and frequent use of childish or risqué jokes. The character has become one of Japan's most recognizable comic children. Subsequent international spread of the manga and anime gave Shin-chan a broad audience but also exposed the character's style of humour to different regulatory and cultural expectations. This led to criticism and censorship abroad because of the character's antics, including mooning, suggestive language, and adult-oriented jokes.

== Concept and role ==
Shin-chan was created by manga artist Yoshito Usui as the titular protagonist of Crayon Shin-chan. The manga began in Weekly Manga Action in August 1990, and the anime began on the TV Asahi network in April 1992.

Script supervisor Jin Kanai described Shin-chan as an unusual type of protagonist because he does not normally drive the story forward. Kanai said that Shin-chan instead "derails" the plot through jokes and digressions, creating a structure closer to a comedy sketch than to conventional plot-led storytelling. Kanai credited Usui's original manga with establishing this distinctive structure, in which an ordinary premise, such as the family preparing to go out, can be displaced by Shin-chan's interruptions until the planned event never occurs.

Kanai also identified the exchanges between Shin-chan and his mother Misae (Mitzi in some English versions) as the origin of the series' humour, arguing that their everyday mother-and-child conversations and comic timing are widely understood and relatable to Japanese audiences. He said the production staff avoid allowing the comedy to become routine, because viewers should not be able to predict Shin-chan's next line or action.

== Characteristics ==
Shin-chan is a five-year-old kindergarten boy who often behaves inappropriately for his age. He is fond of attractive older women and the snack Chocobi, who remains unfazed by events around him and repeatedly causes incidents wherever he goes. TV Asahi's official character profile describes him as loving Action Mask, and as someone who causes commotions wherever he goes. He lives with his parents, Hiroshi and Misae ("Mitzi" in the CMX/One Peace English version of the manga), his younger sister Himawari, and the family dog Shiro. The official character page describes Shiro as a male mixed-breed dog picked up by Shin-chan, and notes that the two have a friend-like relationship. The character's humour frequently depends on bodily comedy, wordplay, and behaviour that appears adult or socially inappropriate when performed by a child.

== Appearances ==
Shin-chan appears as the protagonist of the Crayon Shin-chan manga and its adaptations. In these, he is usually depicted as a member of the Nohara family and the Kasukabe Defence Force, a group of kindergarten friends. The films often place the Shin-chan, his family, and his friends into larger adventure plots while retaining the television series' combination of comedy, family sentiment, and disruptive behaviour. The 2015 film Crayon Shin-chan: My Moving Story! Cactus Large Attack! revolves around the Nohara family moving from Kasukabe to Mexico; the film's promotion included public events in which Shin-chan filed fictional moving-out and moving-in documents with Kasukabe City.

== Voice portrayal ==
In the original Japanese version, Shin-chan was voiced by Akiko Yajima from the start of the anime until June 2018. Yajima's last episode as Shin-chan aired on June 29, 2018. Since then, Shin-chan has been voiced by Yumiko Kobayashi.

Kobayashi described the role as a major responsibility because Shin-chan was a nationally known character and because Yajima's performance had defined the role for many viewers. In a 2019 interview with Oricon, Kobayashi said she had studied Yajima's voice since early in her career and felt that taking over the same role connected to her own beginnings as a voice actor. She also stated that she did not expect to surpass the memories of viewers who grew up with Yajima's performance, but hoped that her own version of Shin-chan would eventually become accepted.

== Cultural impact and reception ==
=== Public use ===
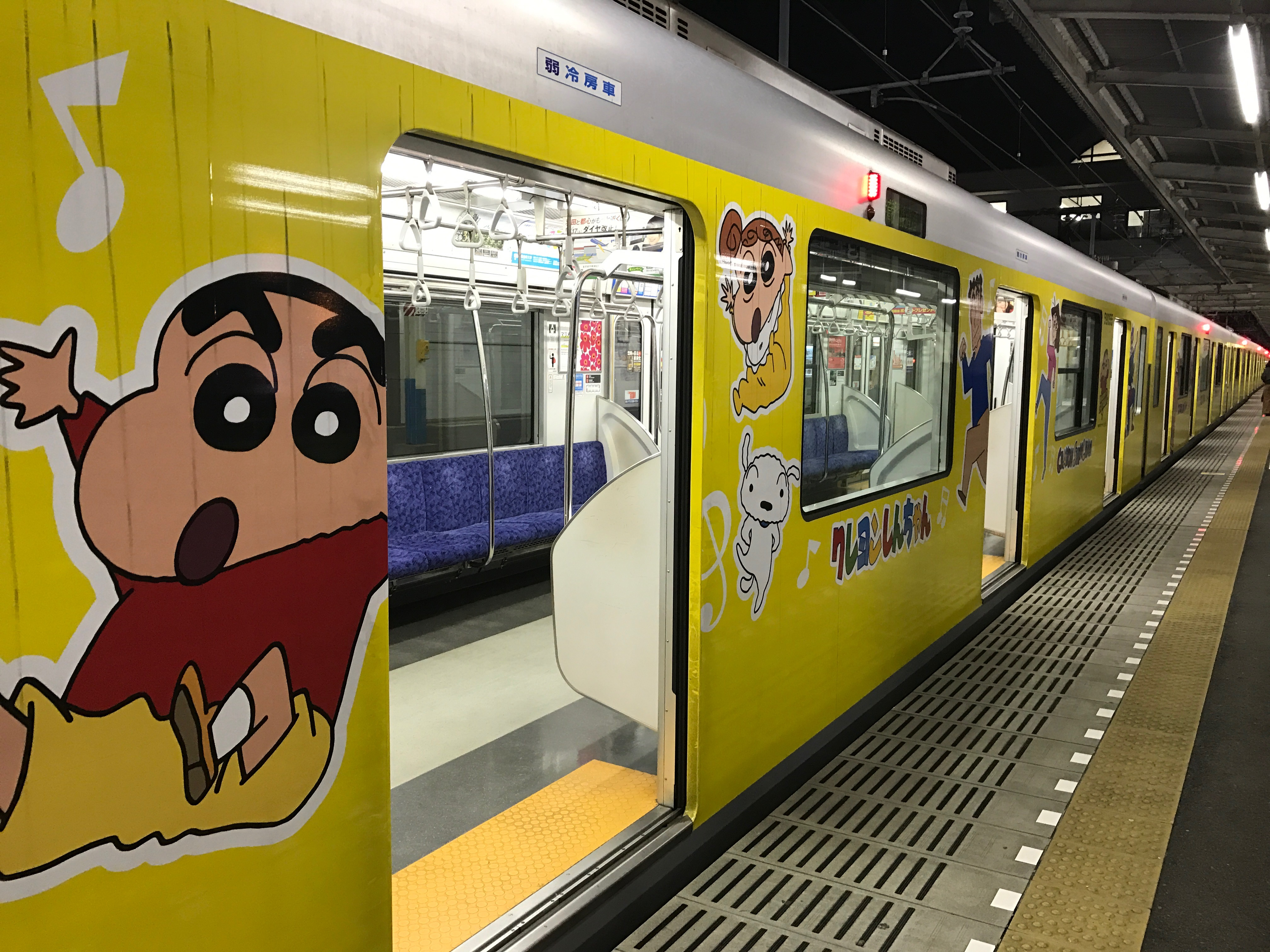
Train in special Crayon Shin-chan vinyl wrapping livery at Kurihashi Station, Japan

Shin-chan and the Nohara family have been used in civic and promotional contexts associated with Kasukabe, Saitama, the city used as their fictional home. In 2004, the Nohara family received a special resident certificate from Kasukabe to commemorate the city's 50th anniversary, with the fictional address listed as Futaba-cho 904. J-CAST reported that Kasukabe later sold a limited set of 10,000 special resident certificates for the family in 2010, with proceeds used for child-rearing support and city promotion. The article also stated that the family had been specially registered in 2004 and had served from 2009 as child-rearing support characters and from 2010 as city guides.

The character's connection with Kasukabe has also been used in film promotion. In 2015, Eiga.com reported that Shin-chan filed a fictional moving-out notice at Kasukabe City Hall as part of the promotion for Crayon Shin-chan: My Moving Story! Cactus Large Attack!, in which the Nohara family moves to Mexico. The report noted that Shin-chan had cooperated in Kasukabe publicity as a child-rearing support character and city guide since the issuance of the special resident registration. Mantan Web later reported that Shin-chan filed a fictional moving-in notice after returning from Mexico, continuing the same city-hall promotion.

Jibanyan was also selected as one of several anime and manga characters used in a Tokyo 2020 Olympics campaign. ICv2 reported that Shin-chan appeared with characters including Goku, Luffy, Naruto, Sailor Moon, Jibanyan and Astro Boy on official merchandise.

Other public uses of Crayon Shin-chan include a Cabinet Office child-abduction prevention campaign, as an image character for the 2004 National Sports Festival in Saitama, and as an example of a nuclear family in a civics textbook.

=== Controversy and international reception ===
Shin-chan's humour has caused controversy outside Japan. In 2017, Julian Ryall of the South China Morning Post described Shin-chan as a "Japanese Bart Simpson", a well known troublemaker character archetype in Western animation. Writing for The Guardian, Justin McCurry described him as a five-year-old known for mooning and blurting out risqué spoonerisms, a combination that delighted Japanese children while frustrating some parents and regulators abroad. The same article noted that the character's irreverent language and onomatopoeic catchphrases contributed to his popularity among both children and adults in Japan.

In 2014, Indonesia's broadcasting commission had warned broadcasters to censor parts of the television anime or air it later because of scenes involving Shin-chan's bare buttocks, scantily clad women, and other "indecent" material. The article described Shin-chan as a precocious five-year-old whose mooning and risqué wordplay had entertained Japanese children for more than two decades while provoking criticism from parents and regulators. The anime began broadcasting in Indonesia in 2000 and became the number-one rated television programme there by 2006.

=== Academic and cultural commentary ===
Academic writing on Crayon Shin-chan has generally treated the character as part of a broader family-anime and popular-culture system. William Lee's chapter "From Sazae-san to Crayon Shin-chan: Family Anime, Social Change, and Nostalgia in Japan", published in Japan Pop!: Inside the World of Japanese Popular Culture, discusses Crayon Shin-chan in relation to Japanese family anime and changing social images of the household. Mary Grigsby's chapter on Sailor Moon and Crayon Shin-Chan in Themes and Issues in Asian Cartooning examines gender as reflected in Japanese culture-industry products, using Shin-chan's depiction in Crayon Shin-Chan as one of its case studies.
