= Super Shiro =

2019 original net animation series

- Promotional poster
- Genre: Comedy
- Created by: Yoshito Usui (story); Masaki Yuasa (concept)
- Original net animation
- Directed by: Masaki Yuasa (chief director); Tomohisa Shimoyama
- Produced by: Eunyoung Choi (animation); Takanobu Sano; Kensuke Suzuki; Rika Tsurusaki; Yuki Yoshida
- Written by: Kimiko Ueno
- Music by: Kenta Higashiohji; Akifumi Tada
- Studio: Science Saru (Note: Animation Production (アニメーション制作) and Planning and Production (企画制作)); Shin-Ei Animation (Note: Planning and Production (企画制作))
- Released: October 14, 2019 – September 7, 2020
- Episodes: 48
- Manga
- Written by: Kenta Aiba
- Published by: Futabasha
- Imprint: Action Comics
- Magazine: Monthly Manga Town
- Original run: August 2020 – December 2021
- Volumes: 2

Super Shiro (stylized in all caps) is a Japanese original net animation series produced by Science Saru who also handles planning and general production duties alongside Shin-Ei Animation. A spin-off of the popular Crayon Shin-chan franchise, based on the manga of the same name by Yoshito Usui, the series focuses on the adventures of Shiro, a seemingly-normal family dog who, when the Earth is threatened, secretly transforms into a canine superhero to protect the planet from nefarious villains. The series, consisting of 48 five-minute episodes, was released in Japan exclusively on the TV Asahi-affiliated streaming platforms AbemaTV and Telasa from October 2019 to September 2020, and was subsequently aired on Cartoon Network in Australia, India, and throughout Southeast Asia as well as Taiwan.

A manga adaptation written and illustrated by Kenta Aiba was serialized in Futabasha's Monthly Manga Town magazine from August 2020 to December 2021 with its chapters being collected into two tankobon volumes.

== Premise ==
Shiro, a seemingly ordinary dog, lives with the Nohara family and leads a seemingly ordinary life. With his human family often involved in various adventures, Shiro is frequently left to his own devices, and it is during these times when he is alone that the secret life of this extraordinary dog is revealed.

For Shiro is no regular hound - he is Super Shiro, a superhero dog tasked with protecting the Earth from nefarious evil-doers. Whenever he puts on his super hero badge, he transforms into an ultra-cool canine protector of justice (complete with a deep, ultra-cool superhero voice). His mission is to find and secure the "Bobobobobone," a legendary dog bone that, it is said, grants its owner the power to rule the world. But Shiro isn't alone in this quest: the scheming canine scientist Dekapoo is also after the bone and hopes to use its powers to make himself World President. Complicating matters is that neither Shiro nor Dekapoo knows what the legendary bone looks like. They only know it by reputation: that it is supposedly "glorious, elegant, and wild" (attributes which can be determined by smelling the bone). Shiro is aided in his search by Bibo, an alien ally stationed at Super Hero Space Headquarters, a space station distant from Earth. Whenever Shiro finds a bone he thinks might be the one, he must send it via a teleporter to Bibo... but if he's gotten it wrong and the bone isn't the right one, it will cause an explosion and Shiro will be sent back to square one on his quest. Before long, the search attracts other doggy attention, including from Can Can, a stylish lady hound who's just as eager to make the "Bobobobobone" hers. Can Shiro get the mysterious bone before it falls into the wrong paws?

== Characters ==
Super Shiro (スーパーシロ)
Voiced by: Mari Mashiba (as Shiro); Akio Otsuka (as Super Shiro)
The titular character of the series. When Shiro is in the form of a normal dog, he speaks/barks in his normal "doggie voice" (played by Mari Mashiba). However, when he transforms into his superhero self, he gains a deeper "hero voice" (played by Akio Otsuka). Shiro's "hero voice" serves as an internal monologue (his inner thoughts, as well as the narration of the story), but whenever he speaks out loud, he still has his normal "doggie voice." Director Masaaki Yuasa noted that his intention with Shiro's "hero voice" was to make him sound like as cool of a character as possible, since this is the voice that Shiro speaks with in his heart. Shiro's task is to find the "Bobobobobone" before any ill-meaning miscreants can use it to oppress or destroy the world. Yuasa described Shiro as "a hero who doesn't cooperate, unless he's asked to."

Dekapoo (デカプー)
Voiced by: Anri Katsu
Super Shiro's nemesis. A mad genius scientist and inventor, he is always using his latest creations to try and defeat Shiro. Dekapoo is obsessed with finding the "Bobobobobone" so that he can rule the world.

Bibo (ビボ)
Voiced by: Yukana
Super Shiro's alien ally, Bibo helps direct Shiro's quest for the "Bobobobobone" and provides helpful advice. According to Yuasa, Bibo has "a coworker's detachment" from Shiro in that he is just someone she has to work with, though the natural kindness in her voice helps balance this out.

Can Can (キャンキャン)
Voiced by: Ibuki Kido
A stylish female dog who has lived a life of privilege: anything she wants, she "can" have. She sets her sights on acquiring the "Bobobobobone" to have even more friends, parties, and luxury. Yuasa identified her as a character he particularly likes.

Aura (オーラ)
Voiced by: Setsuji Satō
A mysterious crow always looking to stir up mischief. Yuasa described him as a character with a particularly interesting appearance and manner of speaking.

== Episodes ==
No.	Title	Written by	Original release date
1	"Shiro is a superhero" (Japanese: シロはスーパーヒーロー)	Kimiko Ueno and Masaaki Yuasa	TBA
2	"The Wack Snack Factory" (Japanese: おかしなおかし工場)	Kimiko Ueno	TBA
3	"A Jewel Is the Bobobobo-bone" (Japanese: 宝石はボボボボボーン)	Kimiko Ueno	TBA
4	"Steal the Eggs!" (Japanese: たまごを奪え!)	Kimiko Ueno	TBA
5	"In the Pond..." (Japanese: 池の中は...)	Kimiko Ueno	TBA
6	"Summer Break Exercises with Shinnosuke" (Japanese: しんのすけと夏休み体操)	Kimiko Ueno	TBA
7	"The Fun Museum" (Japanese: 楽しい博物館)	Kimiko Ueno	TBA
8	"The Rope Bridge Rhapsody" (Japanese: 吊り橋ラプソディ)	Kimiko Ueno	TBA
9	"The Hardworking Ants" (Japanese: 働きもののアリさん)	Kimiko Ueno	TBA
10	"Can't Handle the Cold" (Japanese: 寒いのは苦手)	Kimiko Ueno	TBA
11	"Follow the Balloon!" (Japanese: 風船を追え!)	Kimiko Ueno	TBA
12	"Birth of a Super Hero" (Japanese: スーパーなヒーロー誕生)	TBA	
13	"Wild Canned Food" (Japanese: ワイルドな缶詰)	Kimiko Ueno	TBA
14	"The Beautiful CanCan" (Japanese: 麗しのキャンキャン)	Kimiko Ueno	TBA
15	"Jolly Bowling" (Japanese: ゆかいなボウリング)	Kimiko Ueno	TBA
16	"Forgotten Umbrellas" (Japanese: 傘は忘れがち)	Kimiko Ueno	TBA
17	"The Dangerous Construction Site" (Japanese: きけんな工事現場)	Kimiko Ueno	TBA
18	"Bottles, Bottles, Bottles" (Japanese: ビン・ビン・ビン)	Kimiko Ueno	TBA
19	"Showdown in the Corn Field" (Japanese: 決闘はとうもろこし畑で)	Kimiko Ueno	TBA
20	"CanCan Loves the Swings" (Japanese: キャンキャンはブランコがお好き)	Kimiko Ueno	TBA
21	"Mayhem While Fishing for Sardines" (Japanese: ワカサギ釣りで大騒動)	Kimiko Ueno	TBA
22	"Quiet During Nap Time" (Japanese: お昼寝中はおしずかに)	Kimiko Ueno	TBA
23	"Welcome to the Space Museum" (Japanese: ようこそ宇宙博物館へ)	Kimiko Ueno	TBA
24	"Dekapoo, Aim to Be World President" (Japanese: デカプー、世界大統領をめざす)	Kimiko Ueno	TBA
25	"Sweet Life of Honey Bees" (Japanese: ミツバチの甘い生活)	Kimiko Ueno	TBA
26	"The Scary Professor's Mansion" (Japanese: こわ～い博士の館)	Kimiko Ueno	TBA
27	"Don't Move!" (Japanese: 動いちゃダメ!)	Kimiko Ueno	TBA
28	"Muscles! Muscles! Muscles!" (Japanese: マッスル!マッスル!マッスル!)	Kimiko Ueno	TBA
29	"Take Care of Your Teeth" (Japanese: 歯は大切に)	Kimiko Ueno	TBA
30	"The Doberman's Favorite" (Japanese: ドーベルマンのお気に入り)	Kimiko Ueno	TBA
31	"Having Fun Picking Mushrooms" (Japanese: 楽しいきのこ狩り)	Kimiko Ueno	TBA
32	"The Show-off Sing-off" (Japanese: 自慢ののど自慢)	Kimiko Ueno	TBA
33	"The Trash House in the Pond" (Japanese: 池の中のゴミ屋敷)	Kimiko Ueno	TBA
34	"A Hero's Holiday" (Japanese: ヒーローの休日)	Kimiko Ueno	TBA
35	"Adventures in the Jungle" (Japanese: ジャングルで大冒険)	Kimiko Ueno	TBA
36	"The Daily Life of CanCan" (Japanese: キャンキャンの日常)	Kimiko Ueno	TBA
37	"Shiro Becomes a Ninja" (Japanese: シロ、忍者になる)	Kimiko Ueno	TBA
38	"The Secrets of the Badge" (Japanese: バッジの秘密)	Kimiko Ueno	TBA
39	"The Life of Ants" (Japanese: アリさんの生活)	Kimiko Ueno	TBA
40	"Sunday Golf" (Japanese: 日曜日のゴルフ)	Kimiko Ueno	TBA
41	"One Sleepless Night" (Japanese: 眠れない夜)	Kimiko Ueno	TBA
42	"The Hero Catches a Cold" (Japanese: ヒーロー、風邪をひく)	Kimiko Ueno	TBA
43	"Run, Flee, and Follow" (Japanese: 走って、逃げて、追いかけろ)	Kimiko Ueno	TBA
44	"The Mysterious Bobobobo-bone" (Japanese: 不思議なボボボボボーン)	Kimiko Ueno	TBA
45	"Popopopo-popcorn" (Japanese: ポポポポポップコーン)	Kimiko Ueno	TBA
46	"The Marvelous Laundry" (Japanese: 華麗なる洗濯物)	Kimiko Ueno	TBA
47	"The Big Watermelon" (Japanese: 大きなスイカ)	Kimiko Ueno	TBA
48	"Midnight at the Department Store" (Japanese: 真夜中のデパート)	Kimiko Ueno	TBA

== Production ==
Production of Super Shiro arose out of director Masaaki Yuasa's longstanding affiliation with the Crayon Shin-chan series. Yuasa first became involved with the franchise in 1992 while early in his career as an animator, where he took on a variety of creative roles including key animation, storyboarding, set and background design, prop and vehicle design, and contribution of story concepts and ideas. Over the course of the next decade, he specialized in imagining, designing, and animating the inventive visual climaxes of the annual Crayon Shin-chan films. Crayon Shin-chan was not only an important early work in Yuasa's career, but also provided him with the first project he truly enjoyed and felt he had artistic freedom to express his own style; moreover, his creative success while working on the series inspired his desire to become a director. Even after becoming a director, Yuasa periodically returned to the Crayon Shin-chan franchise, directing Shin-men (2010–12), a group of special episodes embedded within the main Crayon Shin-chan television series, and contributing the production resources of his studio Science Saru to the production of two franchise films, Crayon Shin-chan: Intense Battle! Robo Dad Strikes Back (2014) and Crayon Shin-chan: My Moving Story! Cactus Large Attack! (2015). As such, Yuasa's involvement in the Super Shiro project represented a return to his origins as an animator and creator in the industry.

In addition to Yuasa, the Super Shiro series featured the contributions of other Crayon Shin-chan franchise veterans. Chief director and character designer Tomohisa Shimoyama, who made his series directorial debut with Super Shiro after a long career as an animator, had earlier provided animation on two of the Crayon Shin-chan films. Lead screenwriter Kimiko Ueno previously wrote three films in the franchise, and co-composer Akifumi Tada wrote music for four of the franchise's films.

=== Development ===
Yuasa set out to create a short-format, slapstick comedy series in the style of the American cartoon series Tom and Jerry (1940–present), where (unlike in Crayon Shin-chan), the camera and perspective of the narrative is from a "dog's-eye view" of the world. According to Yuasa, Tom and Jerry was an extremely influential inspiration for the series, not only in regards to the comedic approach, but also in terms of the storytelling. The idea to use a narrator (whom the characters would hear and react to) was inspired by Tom and Jerry, with the American sitcom Bewitched (1964–72) serving as an additional inspiration. With regard to the slapstick format, Shimoyama stated that the series afforded him, Yuasa, and the animators an unusual degree of freedom. Shimoyama and Yuasa described the depiction of movement, particularly fast movement, as the most important thing for determining whether the comedy aspects would succeed.

The music for the series was written early in the development process, which allowed the animation team to create sequences with specific musical cues in mind. This was another inspiration from Tom and Jerry, as the classic shorts were made in this way, with the music existing before the animation.

=== Casting ===
According to Shimoyama, Yuasa initially pitched the idea for Super Shiro as a dog superhero voiced by Akio Ōtsuka. As such, Ōtsuka was always envisioned in the lead role. For the role of Aura, Setsuji Satō was also envisioned from the beginning, as he had previously played a mysterious character in Yuasa's anime series The Tatami Galaxy (2010). Yuasa had been looking to work with him again, and Super Shiro provided an ideal opportunity. Anri Katsu, who played Dekapoo, was identified by Shimoyama as a master of ad-libbing moments which enhanced the visual slapstick; as a result, many of his line additions and alterations were incorporated into the episodes. Shimoyama ultimately decided to keep Dekapoo's scripted lines to a minimum, allowing Katsu to fill in the rest based on the suggestion of the storyboards and animated visuals. Katsu helped inspire the other actors with interpreting the visuals (which were often not finished at the time of dialogue recording) to have a better sense of how to play each scene.

=== Business Development ===
Super Shiro was a joint production between TV Asahi (the longtime broadcaster of Crayon Shin-chan) and Turner Broadcasting System Asia Pacific, with Turner securing broadcast rights for the series across the Asia-Pacific region (excluding China) in exchange for a significant financial investment. The collaboration represented the first regional deal between TV Asahi and Turner.

== Music ==
The series theme song, "Super Shiro Gymnastics" (スーパーシロ体操), was performed by singer-songwriter Mewhan. The music video for the song was a hit on social media, receiving over 16 million views on TikTok. Mewhan subsequently performed the song in a live concert which was filmed and released on Blu-ray in May 2020.

== Release ==
Super Shiro was originally released in Japan on October 14, 2019, on the streaming platforms AbemaTV and Telasa. The release continued with one episode per week and concluded on September 7, 2020. An international release on Cartoon Network throughout Southeast Asia and Australia continued in 2020, and the series premiered on Cartoon Network India on February 22, 2021.

=== Home video release ===
In Japan, the first half of the series was released on DVD on April 27, 2021. The DVD release of the second half, as well as a compilation Blu-ray set of the complete series, are scheduled for release on September 28, 2021.

== Reception ==
The series was nominated in the category of Best 2D Animated Program at the 2020 Asian Television Awards.

== Related media ==
=== Crayon Shin-chan crossover ===
Following the conclusion of Super Shiro, Science Saru and main Crayon Shin-chan production studio Shin-Ei Animation collaborated on a special crossover episode of Crayon Shin-chan. The special, which aired in Japan on TV Asahi on October 10, 2020, consisted of three short mini-episodes which featured the Super Shiro characters interacting with the main series characters.

=== Manga adaptation ===
A manga version of the series, written and illustrated by Kenta Aiba and published by Futabasha in Monthly Manga Town magazine, was released in conjunction with the anime. The first compiled volume of the manga was published in Japan on May 12, 2021.

=== Sanrio crossover ===
In October 2020, character goods company Sanrio entered into a collaboration with the Super Shiro series, featuring Shiro and the Sanrio characters Cinnamoroll, Pompompurin, and Pochacco grouped together on assorted merchandise. Additionally, Sanrio's indoor theme park Sanrio Puroland hosted an online Halloween music festival on October 30, 2020, in which Shiro and series theme song artist Mewhan performed alongside the Sanrio characters.

=== Game ===
In Japan, the content sharing website GIFMAGAZINE posted a Shiro Bobobobobone Catching Game on March 29, 2020, which could be played via a web browser.
