= Crayon Shin-chan: Saikyou Kazoku Kasukabe King Wii =

2006 video game

- Developer: Banpresto
- Publishers: Banpresto (Japan); 505 Games (Spain)
- Platform: Wii
- Release: JP: December 2, 2006; ESP: April 25, 2008
- Genre: Party
- Modes: Single-player, multiplayer

Crayon Shin-chan: Saikyou Kazoku Kasukabe King Wii (クレヨンしんちゃん 最強家族カスカベキング うぃ～, Kureyon Shin-chan: Saikyō Kazoku Kasukabe Kingu Wī) is a video game developed and published by Banpresto for the Wii based upon the manga and anime series Crayon Shin-chan. The game was released in Spain on April 25, 2008, by 505 Games as Shin Chan: Las Nuevas Aventuras para Wii. The game was a launch title for the Wii in Japan.

The game consists of a series of mini-games integrated into the world of Shin-chan.
