= Crayon Shin-chan =

Japanese manga series

- First tankōbon volume cover, featuring Shin-chan (Shinnosuke Nohara)

クレヨンしんちゃん (Kureyon Shin-chan)
- Genre: Comedy, slice of life
- Manga
- Written by: Yoshito Usui
- Published by: Futabasha
- English publisher: NA: One Peace Books; ComicsOne (former); CMX Manga (former)
- Imprint: Action Comics
- Magazine: Weekly Manga Action (1990–2000); Manga Town (2000–2010)
- Original run: August 1990 – February 2010
- Volumes: 50
- Manga

New Crayon Shin-chan
- Written by: UY Team
- Published by: Futabasha
- Imprint: Action Comics
- Magazine: Manga Town (2010–2023); Manga Crayon Shin-chan.com (2024–present)
- Original run: August 2010 – present
- Volumes: 15
- Anime television series
- Crayon Shin-chan (1992-present)
- Spin-off
- SHIN-MEN (anime, 2010–2012); Crayon Shin-chan: SHIN-MEN (manga, 2010–2013); Action Mask (manga, 2013–2015); Nohara Hiroshi Hirumeshi no Ryūgi (manga, 2015–present; anime, 2025); Crayon Shin-chan Spin-off (anime, 2016–2017); Super Shiro (anime, 2019–2020; manga, 2020–2021); Freestyle Shin-chan: Kasukabe no Rapper (anime, 2022–2024)
- Other media
- List of Crayon Shin-chan films; List of Crayon Shin-chan video games
- icon

Crayon Shin-chan (Japanese: クレヨンしんちゃん, Hepburn: Kureyon Shin-chan) is a Japanese manga series written and illustrated by Yoshito Usui. The series revolves around the title character, as well as his family and friends, and their lives in and around the town of Kasukabe, Saitama. It was first serialized in Futabasha's seinen manga magazine Weekly Manga Action from 1990 to 2000, before moving to the monthly magazine Manga Town that year. Following Usui's death, the original manga ended in February 2010. A new manga series by members of Usui's team, titled New Crayon Shin-chan (新クレヨンしんちゃん, Shin Kureyon Shin-chan), began in Manga Town in August 2010; since 2023, it has run on its own website.

The manga spawned a media franchise, which includes an anime television series that has aired on TV Asahi since April 13, 1992, with over 1200 episodes. The anime has been dubbed in 30 languages and aired in 45 countries. The franchise also includes several spin-off anime and manga series, films, and video games. As of 2023, both the Crayon Shin-Chan and New Crayon Shin-Chan manga have over 148 million copies in circulation, making them among the best-selling manga series in history.

== Synopsis ==
Set in the city of Kasukabe in Saitama Prefecture within the Greater Tokyo Area of Japan, the series follows the adventures of the five-year-old Shinnosuke "Shin-chan" Nohara and his parents, baby sister, dog, neighbours, and best friends. Most of the plot is about Shin-chan's daily life, but it is often interspersed with fantastic and incredible elements.

Many of the jokes in the series stem from Shin-chan's occasionally weird, unnatural and inappropriate use of language, as well as from his mischievous behaviour. Consequently, non-Japanese readers and some viewers may find it difficult to understand his jokes. Some gags may require an understanding of Japanese culture and/or language to be fully appreciated; for example, his "Mr. Elephant" impression, while being transparently obvious as a physical gag, also has a deeper resonance with contemporary Japanese culture since it refers to the popular Japanese children's song "Zou-san" (ぞうさん). But after modest translation, it is popular in the rest of Asia due to cultural compatibility. It also contains many sarcastic jokes and stereotype humour.

The series is mainly of a comedy style with a lot of sexual innuendo, leading to parents forbidding their children to watch it. However, due to its popularity, it's also stylistically as family-friendly as possible, although it may not apply everywhere. Most episodes are about the importance of family and friends. On rare occasions, it also has some darker episodes like Miss Matsuzaka's boyfriend dying in the manga, though it was not adapted into an anime episode. It also includes several horror adaptations, for example "The Line of no End", "The Horrible Elevator" and "The Kindergarten Stairs".

Abnormal for his age, Shin-chan regularly becomes besotted with pretty female characters in skimpy clothing who are much older than him, and an additional source of humour is derived from his childlike attempts at flirting with these characters, such as by asking them (inappropriately, on several levels) "Do you like green peppers?" (ピーマン好き?) (because he hates green peppers so much). He continually displays a lack of tact when talking to adults, asking questions such as "Why can't you cook?" to his friend's mom or "How old are you?" to elderly people.

== Media ==
=== Manga ===
Crayon Shin-chan, written and illustrated by Yoshito Usui, debuted in Futabasha's seinen manga magazine Weekly Manga Action in 1990. It started as a spin-off of the character Shinnosuke Nikaido (二階堂信之介) of another series by Yoshito Usui, Darakuya Store Monogatari (だらくやストア物語). The chapters were collected into 50 tankōbon volumes, which were published under Futabasha's Action Comics imprint, from April 11, 1992, to July 10, 2010.

Yoshito Usui died on September 11, 2009, after a fall at Mount Arafune. After Usui died, Futabasha originally planned to end Crayon Shin-chan in November 2009. Upon discovering new manuscripts, Futabasha decided to extend the comic's run until the March 2010 issue of the magazine, which shipped on February 5, 2010. Although the series formally ended on February 5, 2010, it was announced on December 1, 2009, that a new manga would begin in the summer of 2010 by members of Usui's team, titled New Crayon Shin-chan (新クレヨンしんちゃん, Shin Kureyon Shin-chan). This manga moved to a dedicated website after the magazine it was serialized in ended publication in late 2023.

A series of four bilingual Japanese-English manga were released in 1996 in Japan as Shin-chan: The Little Horror! (クレヨンしんちゃんの楽しいゾ英会話).

ComicsOne translated ten volumes of Crayon Shin-chan into English and released it in the United States of America. Occasional pop culture references familiar to Americans, such as Pokémon and Britney Spears, were added to increase the appeal to American audiences. The manga is mirrored from its original to read from left to right. Starting with the sixth volume, many of the names were changed to the ones used in the Vitello and Phuuz English version of the anime, even though the dub never aired in North America. This translation is rated Teen.

Since then, American publisher DrMaster took over the licenses of several manga series, including Crayon Shin-chan, from ComicsOne. No new volumes of Crayon Shin-chan were released under the DrMaster imprint.

On July 28, 2007, DC Comics' manga division CMX announced the acquisition of the Crayon Shin-chan manga. The CMX version is rated Mature instead of Teen from ComicsOne, because of nudity, sexual humor, dirty and bad language. The first volume was released on February 27, 2008, with uncensored art, and the style of jokes that frequent the Adult Swim dub with some throw backs to the original version, such as his original greeting. However, volume 10 omitted a gag which was in the ComicsOne version.

On April 11, 2012, One Peace Books announced their release of the manga, which is a reprint of the CMX version, in an omnibus format. Three omnibus volumes were released simultaneously on October 15, 2012. Volume 4 was released on November 13, 2013, and included the Japanese volume 12, marking the first time that particular volume has an English translation.

The Crayon Shin-chan manga spin-off, Action Mask, is currently available as read-only/print-only subscription from Crunchyroll and Futabasha. The main Shin-chan manga is also available from Crunchyroll using the CMX version, concurrently up to volume 10.

=== Anime ===
==== Television series ====
An anime adaptation of Crayon Shin-chan, produced by Shin-Ei Animation, has aired on TV Asahi since April 13, 1992.

A live-action film titled Ballad: Song of a Nameless Love, based on Crayon Shin-chan's animated film Crayon Shin-chan: Fierceness That Invites Storm! The Battle of the Warring States, was released in 2009, with the live action film's Kawakami family being the equivalent of the anime's Nohara family.

=== Video games ===
==== Console and handheld ====
Many video games were only released in Japan, but there were others released in South Korea, Italy and Spain.

Title	System	Release date
Crayon Shin-chan: Ora to Shiro wa Otomodachi da yo (クレヨンしんちゃん "オラとシロはお友達だよ")	Game Boy	April 9, 1993
Crayon Shin-chan: Arashi o Yobu Enji (クレヨンしんちゃん 嵐を呼ぶ園児)	Super Famicom and Mega Drive	July 30, 1993 (SFC); March 11, 1994 (MD)
Crayon Shin-Chan: Ora to Poi Poi (クレヨンしんちゃん オラとポイポイ)	Famicom	August 27, 1993
Quiz Crayon Shin-chan (クイズ クレヨンしんちゃん)	Arcade	August 1993
Crayon Shin-chan 2: Ora to Wanpaku Gokko da zo (クレヨンしんちゃん2 "オラとわんぱくごっこだゾ")	Game Boy	October 22, 1993
Crayon Shin-chan Ora to Asobo (クレヨンしんちゃん オラと遊ぼ)	Arcade	December 1993
Crayon Shin-chan no Ora to Issho ni Asobou yo! (クレヨンしんちゃんのオラといっしょにあそぼうよ!)	Sega Pico	March 1994
Crayon Shin-chan 3: Ora no Gokigen Athletic (クレヨンしんちゃん3 オラのごきげんアスレチック)	Game Boy	March 26, 1994
Crayon Shin-chan 2: Dai Maou no Gyakushuu (クレヨンしんちゃん2 大魔王の逆襲)	Super Famicom	May 27, 1994
Crayon Shin-chan 4: Ora no Itazura Dai Henshin (クレヨンしんちゃん4 "オラのいたずら大変身")	Game Boy	August 26, 1994
Crayon Shin-chan no Oekaki Note (クレヨンしんちゃんのおえかきノート)	Sega Pico	January 1995
Crayon Shin-chan: Taiketsu! Quantum Panic!! (クレヨンしんちゃん 対決!カンタムパニック!!)	Game Gear	February 24, 1995
Crayon Shin-chan: Puzzle Daimaou no Nazo (クレヨンしんちゃん パズル大魔王の謎)	3DO	March 10, 1995
Crayon Shin-chan: Nagagutsu Dobon (クレヨンしんちゃん 長ぐつドボン)	Super Famicom	September 27, 1996
Crayon Shin-chan: Ora no Gokigen Collection (クレヨンしんちゃん オラのごきげんコレクション)	Game Boy	December 20, 1996
Crayon Shin-chan: Ora no Honto no Kaa-chan Ya~i (クレヨンしんちゃん オラのほんとの母ちゃんやーい)	PC	1997
짱구는 못말려 (Korea)	PC	1997 (Korea)
짱구는 못말려 2 (Korea)	PC	1999
Jjanggu the Unhelpable 3 (짱구는 못말려 3 -돌아온 짱구-) (Korea)	PC/Nuon	2000 (Korea)
짱구는 못말려 4 -부리부리왕국의 비밀 (Korea)	PC	2001
짱구는 못말려 5 -짱구가 줄었어요! (Korea)	PC	2002
짱구는 못말려 6 -원시시대 짱구 (Korea)	PC	2002
짱구는 못말려 7 -흰둥이 구출작전 (Korea)	PC	2003
짱구 스프링스 (Korea)	PC	
Kids Station: Crayon Shin-Chan (キッズステーション クレヨンしんちゃん オラとおもいでつくるゾ!)	PlayStation	November 29, 2001
パソコンやろうよ!マウスでジグソーパズル クレヨンしんちゃん	PC	January 18, 2002
クレヨンしんちゃん オラと一緒に英語する?	PC	August 30, 2002
Crayon Shin-chan: Arashi no Yobu Adventures in Cinemaland! (クレヨンしんちゃん 嵐を呼ぶ シネマランドの大冒険!); Shin chan: Aventuras en Cineland (Spain)	Game Boy Advance	April 16, 2004; December 25, 2005 (Spain)
Crayon Shin-chan: Densetsu o Yobu Omake no To Shukkugaan! (クレヨンしんちゃん 伝説を呼ぶ オマケの都ショックガーン!); Shin chan contra los muñecos de Shock Gahn (Spain)	Game Boy Advance	March 23, 2006; September 18, 2006 (Spain)
Crayon Shin-chan: Saikyou Kazoku Kasukabe King Wii (クレヨンしんちゃん 最強家族カスカベキング うぃ〜); Shin chan: Las nuevas aventuras para Wii (Spain)	Wii	December 2, 2006; April 25, 2008 (Spain)
Crayon Shin-chan DS: Arashi wo Yobu Nutte Crayoon Daisakusen! (クレヨンしんちゃんDS 嵐を呼ぶ ぬってクレヨ〜ン大作戦!) ¡Shin chan flipa en colores! (Spain) 짱구는 못말려 DS 알쏭달쏭 크레용 대작전 (Korea); Shin chan e i colori magici! (Italy)	Nintendo DS	March 21, 2007; November 16, 2007 (Spain); April 5, 2008 (Korea); September 12, 2008 (Italy)
Crayon Shin-chan: Arashi o Yobu Cinema Land (クレヨンしんちゃん 嵐を呼ぶ シネマランド カチンコガチンコ大活劇!); Shin chan: ¡Aventuras de cine! (Spain) 짱구는 못말려 시네마랜드 찰칵찰칵 대소동! (Korea)	Nintendo DS	March 20, 2008; December 5, 2008 (Spain); September 15, 2009 (Korea)
Crayon Shin-chan: Arashi o Yobu – Nendororon Daihenshin (クレヨンしんちゃん 嵐を呼ぶ ねんどろろ〜ん大変身!) ¡Shin chan contra los plastas! (Spain) 짱구는 못말려 말랑말랑 고무찰흙 대변신! (Korea)	Nintendo DS	March 19, 2009; December 4, 2009 (Spain); December 3, 2010 (Korea)
Crayon Shin-chan: Obaka Daininden – Susume! Kasukabe Ninja Tai! (クレヨンしんちゃん おバカ大忍伝 すすめ!カスカベ忍者隊!) 짱구는 못말려 부리부리 떡잎마을 대모험! (Korea)	Nintendo DS	March 18, 2010; October 19, 2012 (Korea)
クレヨンしんちゃんオラとカラオケ大パニック	CROSSO	April 12, 2010
Crayon Shin-chan Shokkugan! Densetsu wo Yobu Omake Daiketsusen!! (クレヨンしんちゃん ショックガ〜ン! 伝説を呼ぶオマケ大ケッ戦!!) 짱구는 못말려 원 플러스 원! 쇼크성랜드 대결전!! (Korea)	Nintendo DS	December 2, 2010; October 27, 2011 (Korea)
クレヨンしんちゃん 恋する47（フォーティーセブン）	Mobage	April 5, 2011
クレヨンしんちゃん シネマDEカード!	Mobage	November 9, 2011
Crayon Shin-chan: Uchu de Achoo!? Yujo no Obakarate (クレヨンしんちゃん 宇宙DEアチョー!? 友情のおバカラテ!!) 짱구는 못말려 판타스틱-! 우주별 대모험!! (Korea)	Nintendo 3DS	December 1, 2011; 2013 (Korea)
짱구는 못말려 온라인 (Korea)	PC	2012 (Korea)
Crayon Shin-chan: Arashi wo Yobu Kasukabe Eiga Stars! (クレヨンしんちゃん 嵐を呼ぶ カスカベ映画スターズ! Crayon Shin-chan: The Storm Called Kasukabe Movie Stars!)	Nintendo 3DS	April 10, 2014
Crayon Shin-Chan Gekiatsu! Oden wa Rudo Dai Konran!! (クレヨンしんちゃん 激アツ！おでんわ～るど大コン乱！)	Nintendo 3DS	November 30, 2017
Crayon Shin-chan: The Storm Called! Flaming Kasukabe Runner!! (クレヨンしんちゃん 嵐を呼ぶ 炎のカスカベランナー!!)	Nintendo Switch	January 14, 2020 (NA); January 24, 2020 (PAL); March 19, 2020 (Japan)
Shin-chan: Me and the Professor on Summer Vacation – The Endless Seven-Day Journey (クレヨンしんちゃん オラと博士の夏休み ～おわらない七日間の旅～)	Nintendo Switch, Nintendo Switch 2, PC	July 15, 2021 (Switch, Japan); August 31, 2022 (PC); March 4, 2027 (Switch 2)
Shin-chan: Shiro and the Coal Town (クレヨンしんちゃん「炭の町のシロ」)	Nintendo Switch, Nintendo Switch 2, and PC	February 22, 2024 (Switch, Japan); October 24, 2024 (PC); March 4, 2027 (Switch 2)

==== Smartphone and tablet ====
Title	Systems	Developers/Publishers	Availability
Shin Chan Kasukabe's Challenge	Android iOS	LUK Internacional; Manduka Games; DoBCN	Discontinued
Crayon Shin-chan: The Storm Called! Flaming Kasukabe Runner! (クレヨンしんちゃん:嵐を呼ぶ!炎のカスカベランナー)	Android iOS	Bushiroad	Discontinued
Crayon Shin-chan: The Storm Called! Flaming Kasukabe Runner! Z (クレヨンしんちゃん ちょ〜嵐を呼ぶ 炎のカスカベランナー!! Z)	Android iOS	Bushiroad	Discontinued
Crayon Shin-chan Operation Little Helper (クレヨンしんちゃんお手伝い大作戦)	Android iOS	Neos	Available
Crayon Shin-chan: Dreaming! Kasukabe Large Battle! (クレヨンしんちゃん 夢みる！カスカベ大合戦)	Android iOS	Nexon Games Japan	Available
Crayon Shin-chan: UFO Panic! Run Kasukabe Guards!! (クレヨンしんちゃん UFOパニック！走れカスカベ防衛隊！)	Android iOS	Nexon Games Japan.	Discontinued on November 11, 2015
Crayon Shin-chan: Sky Fly! Kasukabe Adventure! (クレヨンしんちゃん〜空飛ぶ！カスカベ大冒険〜)	Android iOS	Asakusa Games, in association with Futabasha.	Discontinued
クレヨンしんちゃん 一致団ケツ！ かすかべシティ大開発	Android iOS	Bushiroad	Available
【公式】クレヨンしんちゃん オラのぶりぶりアプリだゾ マンガもゲームもおてんこもりもり 毎日みれば～	Android	Futabasha	Available

Note: The last app isn't a game in itself, rather a Crayon Shin-chan hub with news, manga, and games.

=== Marketing ===
Konami, through Card Connect, has released a series of frames, including a series of colorful holograms, based on the anime's characters.

== Reception ==
As of 2015, the original run of the Crayon Shin-chan manga has sold over 55 million copies, while the New Crayon Shin-chan manga has sold over 3 million copies, surpassing 58 million copies between both, making it one of the best-selling manga series. Including game books, encyclopedic books and other related material, the figure amounts to 148 million. As of 2023, both the Crayon Shin-Chan and New Crayon Shin-Chan series had over 148 million copies in circulation.
