= List of Crayon Shin-chan episodes =

Crayon Shin-chan (Japanese: クレヨンしんちゃん, Hepburn: Kureyon Shin-chan), also known as Shin Chan, is a Japanese manga series written and illustrated by Yoshito Usui. This follows the adventures of the five-year-old Shinnosuke "Shin" Nohara and his parents, baby sister, dog, neighbours, and friends and is set in Kasukabe, Saitama Prefecture of Japan.

An anime adaptation of the series began airing on TV Asahi in 1992 and is still ongoing on several television networks, worldwide. The show has now been dubbed in 36 languages, which aired in 45 countries.

As of July 2026, 1342 episodes of the television series have been broadcast.

== Episodes ==
- List of Crayon Shin-chan episodes (1992–2001)
- List of Crayon Shin-chan episodes (2002–2011)
- List of Crayon Shin-chan episodes (2012–2021)

== English dub episodes ==
=== Vitello dub ===
This is a list of episodes dubbed in English by Vitello Productions in 2002. 52 23-minute episodes (156 5 to 7-minute segments) were dubbed by Vitello. Episodes with segments out of their original Japanese order are indicated by an additional segment number.

English episode no.	Japanese episode no.	Name in English	Japanese (kanji)
1	95	"Playing House"	組長とままごとだゾ
1	95	"Mom Wants to Drive"	母ちゃんは運転免許がないゾ
1	95	"Mom Takes Driving Lessons"	運転免許の教習だゾ
2	68	"Mom's Getting Fat"	母ちゃんのダイエットだゾ
2	68	"I'm a Kiddie Commando"	アスレチックするゾ
2	68	"Dad Lost His Eyebrows"	父ちゃんのマユゲがないゾ
3	61	"P.J. Party with Miss Dori"	よしなが先生の私生活だゾ
3	61	"I Meet a Hishi"	最後のセールスレディだゾ
3	61	"Mom Wants an Air Conditioner"	エアコンを買うゾ
4	81	"I Go Skiing"	スキーバス旅行だゾ
4	81	"Fun at the Ski Lodge"	アフタースキーだゾ
4	81	"Dopes at the Slopes"	家族でスキーだゾ
5	96	"Me Want Cookie"	高級お菓子が食べたいゾ
5	96	"My Date with Miss Uma"	まつざか先生はお疲れだゾ
5	96	"Mom Runs Away"	母ちゃんの家出だゾ
6	87c	"We're Getting a Divorce?!"	野原家のリコンだゾ
6	87a	"Play Ball (Part One)"	ソフトボール大会だゾ その1
6	87b	"Play Ball (Part Two)"	ソフトボール大会だゾ その2
7	140	"I Get Recycled"	チリ紙交換するゾ
7	140	"Mom Killed the TV"	テレビをこわしたゾ
7	140	"Lucky Gets Lucky"	シロとぬいぐるみだゾ
8	58	"Fun with Balloons"	風船をふくらますゾ
8	58	"I Found a Wallet"	おサイフを拾ったゾ
8	58	"I Go to the City"	じいちゃんと東京見物だゾ
9	185	"We Go on Vacation"	オラ達家族で北海道へ行くゾ
9	185	"Vacation Fun"	北海道を食べちゃうゾ
9	185	"Dad Has a Breakdown"	レンタカーがこわれたゾ
10	146	"A Dad-Free Night"	父ちゃんがいない夜だゾ
10	146	"I Hit a Homer"	野球するのも大変だゾ
10	146	"I Clean Up"	プッツンしちゃうゾ
11	115	"Let's Go Fishing"	お船でつりをするゾ
11	115	"Smarty Pants Marti"	天才少女と対決だゾ
11	115	"Driving with Mom"	お車でお迎えするゾ
12	153	"I Make a Man Outta Max"	ナンパの道はきびしいゾ
12	153	"Mom and Dad's Big Night"	食あたりはつらいゾ
12	153	"I Go to the Hospital"	病院にお泊まりだゾ
13	154	"A Visit from Grandpa"	じいちゃんの家出だゾ
13	154	"I Go to Girl-Zoo"	女子大は楽しいゾ
13	154	"Grandpa Won't Leave"	じいちゃんは人騒がせだゾ
14	111	"An Errand to the Post Office"	郵便局におつかいだゾ
14	111	"Going to a Haunted House"	おばけ屋敷に入るゾ
14	111	"Mom Goes on Strike"	母ちゃんのストライキだゾ
15	167c	"Who's Eisenhower?"	シロの愛情物語だゾ
15	167b	"Dad's Secret Admirer"	冬じたくをするゾ
15	167a	"Leaf Me Alone"	枯れ葉のソージだゾ
16	183	"The Late Great Me"	チコクの新記録だゾ
16	183	"Mom's a Shopaholic"	通販はクセになるゾ
16	183	"I Can't Sleep"	平和な眠りだゾ
17	229c	"Me and the Comic Book Guy"	有名マンガ家のタントーだゾ
17	229b	"Cosmo the Germinator"	セイケツ好きの風間くんだゾ
17	229a	"Dad Goes Jogging"	父ちゃんのジョギングだゾ
18	102	"Playing Around with Dad"	父ちゃんと遊んでやるゾ
18	102	"I'm Going Hiking"	山のぼりはつらいゾ
18	102	"Fun with Food"	食品売り場は楽しいゾ
19	141c	"Someone's Got a Boyfriend"	恋のヨカンがするゾ
19	141b	"I Get My Own Room"	オラの部屋が欲しいゾ
19	141a	"Dad Breaks a Promise"	ドライブに行きたいゾ
20	197	"I Climb a Mountain"	遠足で山に登るゾ
20	197	"I'm Mountain Meat"	山でソーナンしちゃったゾ
20	197	"Survival of the Fattest"	みんなでサバイバルするゾ
21	121	"Mom Has a New Dress"	アイスクリームで事件だゾ
21	121	"Bye Bye Cosmo"	風間君とお別れだゾ
21	121	"Mom Leaves Me on the Subway"	忘れられたオラだゾ
22	193	"Mom's Gotta Barf"	母ちゃんはにんしん3カ月だゾ
22	193	"My Cool Collection"	オラのコレクションだゾ
22	193	"I Love Nasty Books"	立ち読みはやめられないゾ
23	139	"I'm on Spring Break"	春の朝はのどかだゾ
23	139	"Lucky Feels Yucky"	シロがお病気だゾ
23	139	"Let's Have a Picnic"	お花見で盛りあがるゾ
24	194	"I Jump-Start the Baby"	胎教にご協力するゾ
24	194	"Cosmo's in Love"	風間君が恋しちゃったゾ
24	194	"I'm a Love Doctor"	恋する風間君をお助けするゾ
25	196	"I Want a New Mom"	新しいママを作ったゾ
25	196	"Playin' in the Pool"	プールで玉さがしだゾ
25	196	"It's Pregnant Mom Month"	妊しん母ちゃんを大切にするゾ
26	168	"Playing Tag"	ボーちゃんと鬼ごっこだゾ
26	168	"I Go on a Date"	デートについてくゾ
26	168	"My Date with Ricky"	デートをもりあげるゾ
27	202	"The Story of Shinocchio"	世界迷作しんのキオだゾ
27	202	"Gimme Back My Ball"	ボールをとりもどすゾ
27	202	"I'm Mom's Bodyguard"	母ちゃんのボディーガードをするゾ
28	122	"Mom Takes a Nap"	お昼寝するのも大変だゾ
28	122	"I Get Free Lunch"	ゴーカにしゃぶしゃぶだゾ
28	122	"Dad's Close Shave"	父ちゃんと散髪だゾ
29	206	"Check Out My Baby"	ひまわりをご紹介するゾ
29	206	"A Picnic with Miss Bono"	おねいさんとピクニックだゾ
29	206	"Fun with the Godfather"	園長先生の家庭訪問だゾ
30	203	"The Baby Comes Home"	赤ちゃんのお帰りだゾ
30	203	"Hanging' Out with the New Baby"	赤ちゃんをあやすゾ
30	203	"I'm Tired"	眠くて眠くて眠たい一日だゾ
31	124a	"Miss Uma's Day Off"	松坂先生の休日だゾ
31	124c	"Mom Lost Her Key"	おうちに入れないゾ
31	124b	"I Swap Moms"	ネネちゃんちの子になるゾ
32	131c	"I Help Dad Shovel Snow"	雪かきは楽しいゾ
32	131b	"Lady Wrestlers Rock"	女子プロレスのファンだゾ
32	131a	"I Get a Love Letter"	おデートをするゾ
33	199	"Am I Getting a Brother or What"	赤ちゃんは男か女だゾ
33	199	"I Help Out the Comic Book Guy"	有名マンガ家のアシスタントだゾ
33	199	"Dad's Stuck with Me"	父ちゃんと公園で遊ぶゾ
34	200	"Dad's Got a Girlfriend"	父ちゃんがラブレターもらったゾ
34	200	"Mom Finds Out"	ラブレターで災難だゾ
34	200	"Debut in the Park"	公園デビューにつきあうゾ
35	251	"Daisy Gets Buzzed"	酔っぱらった？ひまわりだゾ
35	251	"The 3-eyed Dog"	キョーフの三つ目犬だゾ
35	251	"Who Needs Sleep?"	ネムケと戦う父ちゃんだゾ
36	231	"Dad's Last Resort"	父ちゃんのフロク作りだゾ
36	231	"Cosmo Trusts Me"	風間君はオラを信じてるゾ
36	231	"Salesman Shin"	実演販売はオラにおまかせだゾ
37	249	"Max Lost His Snack Money"	遠足のおやつを買うゾ
37	249	"A Trip to the River"	きょうは楽しい遠足だゾ
37	249	"I Get Lost Again"	遠足でまたまた迷子になったゾ
38	222c	"The Godfather Glasses"	勇気の出るサングラスだゾ
38	222b	"Uma the Cat-Lover"	ネコのお世話も大変だゾ
38	222a	"Where's My Sister, Mister?"	ひまわりが消えちゃったゾ
39	250	"The Lovebirds Are Fighting"	ミッチーヨシリンのケンカだゾ
39	250	"Home Alone"	ひとりでのんびりお留守番だゾ
39	250	"We Sleep in the Hallway"	玄関ぐらしも快適だゾ
40	219	"Early Valentine's Day"	野原一家のバレンタインだゾ
40	219	"Little Bigboss Plays Golf"	サラリーマンしんのすけゴルフで遊んじゃうゾ
40	219	"Miss Uma's Valentine"	まつざか先生のバレンタイン勝負だゾ
41	201	"Aunt Minnie Comes to Visit"	マサエおばさんがまた来たゾ
41	201	"The Godfather Is a Cradle Snatcher"	恋するオトメのミホちゃんだゾ
41	201	"We Drill for the Baby"	出産のリハーサルをするゾ
42	216c	"I'm the Boss"	サラリーマンしんのすけ出張に行くゾ
42	216a	"Hey, Remember Me?"	ビデオの主役はオラだゾ
42	216b	"Nobody Loves Me"	お兄ちゃんだって甘えたいゾ
43	255	"The Blowfish Bonus"	ボーナスで少しゼイタクするゾ
43	255	"Fugu Whogu?"	初めてフグを食べちゃうゾ
43	255	"Shin vs the Kung Fu Kid"	さすらいのドラゴンと対決だゾ
44	230	"Mom Gets Malled"	ひまわりと一緒にお買物だゾ
44	230	"Daisy Drives Me Crazy"	ひまわりの相手はつかれるゾ
44	230	"Fun at Skunky's"	ファミリーレストランに行くゾ
45	243	"I Make a Treasure Map"	オラの作った宝の地図だゾ
45	243	"I Make Miss Dori Sick"	かすかべ防衛隊の恩返しだゾ
45	243	"We're Coolie-Oolie"	オラの家にクーラーが付いたゾ
46	198	"I Get Some Class"	お上品はキュークツだゾ
46	198	"The Tortoise and the Hare-Bags"	ウサギとしんちゃん亀の競争だゾ
46	198	"The Kahzu Kamakazes Hit the Pool"	プールでバイトの紅さそり隊だゾ
47	218	"We Ski for Free"	スキー場でリゾートするゾ
47	218	"Uma Whoma?"	謎の美女とスキー教室だゾ
47	218	"Fun at the Arcade"	スキーの後でも遊んじゃうゾ
48	248	"No Train in the Rain"	台風の中でも出勤だゾ
48	248	"There's a Stranger at the Door"	アンケートにご協力するゾ
48	248	"The Lovebirds Move In"	ミッチーとヨシリンが来たゾ
49	233	"What's the Massager For?"	電気マッサージ機で遊ぶゾ
49	233	"Miss Dori Wants to Get Married"	よしなが先生の恋の破局？だゾ
49	233	"Ricky Makes the Pass"	落ちこんだよしなが先生だゾ
50	214c	"Dori's Boyfriend Has a Girlfriend"	よしなが先生の恋の危機だゾ
50	214a	"Daisy Starts Crawling"	ひまわりのハイハイ特訓だゾ
50	214b	"I'm a Mentor Case"	迷子のめんどうを見るゾ
51	104b	"Buttman Saves the Day"	水泳大会がんばるゾ
51	217b	"Hurricane Hannah"	セクシーマリリン台風だゾ
51	217c	"Escape from Planet Kindygarten"	幼稚園から脱出するゾ
52	191	"I'm a Ballerina"	オラと母ちゃんのバレエだゾ
52	191	"Quality Time with Dad"	おねいさんと鬼ごっこだゾ
52	191	"What's Up with Mom?"	母ちゃんが死んじゃうゾ？

=== Phuuz dub ===
This is a list of episodes dubbed in English by phuuz entertainment in 2003. 52 23-minute episodes (156 5 to 7-minute segments) were dubbed by Phuuz with a different voice cast than Vitello used. Episodes with segments out of their original Japanese order are indicated by an additional segment number.

English episode no.	Japanese episode no.	Name in English	Japanese (kanji)
53	117b	"We All Run Away!"	みんなで家出するゾ
53	117c	"I Can Talk to Babies!"	赤ちゃんとお話するゾ
53	117a	"Sharpie, the Tennis Menace!"	テニスで珍プレーだゾ
54	133	"Shin-Chan, Graffiti Man!"	落書きしちゃったゾ
54	133	"Mitsy Gets a Freebie!"	福ぶくろを買うゾ
54	133	"Dotty the Drop-Out!"	受験生に気をつかうゾ
55	128	"We Have a New Year's Party!"	お正月はにぎやかだゾ
55	128	"My Holiday Ski Trip!"	スキーに出かけるゾ
55	128	"Lost in the Frost!"	ゲレンデは大さわぎだゾ
56	129	"I'm a Hero!"	火の用心するゾ
56	129	"Max Gets Famous!"	マサオ君はモテモテだゾ
56	129	"I Can Cook!"	おモチはおいしいゾ
57	59	"Ices is Nices!"	かき氷を食べるゾ
57	59	"Lucky Gets a Shot!"	シロのお注射だゾ
57	59	"We Go Camping!"	家族でキャンプだゾ
58	62	"I Go to the Gas Station!"	ガソリンスタンドへ行くゾ
58	62	"Too Many Watermelons!"	スイカがいっぱいだゾ
58	62	"More Fun with Watermelons!"	スイカ割りをやるゾ
59	76	"I Eat Noodle Soup!"	ラーメンを食べるゾ
59	76	"I Skate Great!"	スケートの天才だゾ
59	76	"I Save a Marriage!"	新婚さんのケンカだゾ
60	71	"There's a New Chick at School!"	ニワトリさんを探すゾ
60	71	"It's Laundry Day!"	お洗濯を手伝うゾ
60	71	"Check Out the New Apartment!"	新婚さんちへ行くゾ
61	98	"New Summer Clothes!"	衣がえをするゾ
61	98	"Wanna Eat Meat!"	ランチは焼肉だゾ
61	98	"A Day at the Races!"	競馬場はおもしろいゾ
62	73a	"Mom's a Teen Queen!"	セーラー服母ちゃんだゾ
62	73b	"I Play House with Miss Grouse!"	モデルハウスで遊ぶゾ
62	77b	"Uma's Dinner with Andre!"	まつざか先生のお見合いだゾ
63	88b	"I Race with Ace!"	三輪車でレースだゾ
63	88c	"It's a Pig-Out!"	バイキングを食べるゾ
63	77a	"I Bake Cookies!"	クッキーを作るゾ
64	72	"I Get a Babysitter!"	学校ごっこをするゾ
64	72	"A Picnic Barbecue!"	バーベキューするゾ
64	72	"Pop's Pooped!"	父ちゃんはお疲れだゾ
65	63a	"Tea for Three!"	まつざか先生のデートだゾ
65	63b	"Sumo Whomo!"	お相撲のけいこだゾ
65	65a	"Hurricane Bruce!"	台風で水害だゾ
66	65c	"I Play Dodgeball!"	ドッジボールで勝負だゾ
66	69b	"We Get Ready for the Fleamarket!"	フリーマーケットに参加だゾ
66	69c	"We Go to the Fleamarket!"	フリーマーケットで商売だゾ
67	123c	"Mom's Part-Time Job!"	母ちゃんのアルバイトだゾ
67	92b	"Mom's Got a Girlfriend!"	長話はメイワクだゾ
67	92c	"I Make Soup!"	ラーメンが急に食べたいゾ
68	215c	"Baby Buggy Bug-Out!"	ベビーカーで競争だゾ
68	215b	"It's Too Cool for School!"	寒い日はにがてだゾ
68	215a	"A Much Better Mom!"	おねいさんの一日母ちゃんだゾ
69	205a	"A Day with Daisy!"	オラはやさしいお兄ちゃんだゾ
69	205c	"We Buy Diapers!"	夜中におむつを買いに行くゾ
69	123a	"I Play Hide and Seek!"	かくれんぼで遊ぶゾ
70	211b	"Daisy Gets a Shot!"	ひまわりの初めての注射だゾ
70	208a	"I Take Care of Mini-Mitz!"	オラは子守上手だゾ
70	211c	"Babysitting with Dad!"	デパートで子守だゾ
71	79a	"I'm a Model!"	ファッションショーに出るゾ
71	208c	"I Have My Own Bank Account!"	オラだけの銀行口座を作ったゾ
71	79c	"I Stay Up for New Year's Eve!"	除夜のカネを聞くゾ
72	75a	"Mom Goes Praisin' Crazy!"	ほめ殺しはつらいゾ
72	84a	"I Hit the Jackpot!"	宝クジを当てるゾ
72	75c	"The Nasty Book Inspector!"	今日も本屋さんで遊ぶゾ
73	84c	"We Have a Snowball Fight!"	雪合戦で勝負だゾ
73	170a	"We're All Sick!"	一家そろって発熱だゾ
73	171a	"Uma's Gonna Quit!"	誘われたまつざか先生だゾ
74	163	"The Crane, the Penguin, and the Little Brown-Nose!"	ペンギンの恩返しだゾ
74	163	"Killer Noodles!"	焼きそばが爆発だゾ
74	163	"The Rain's a Pain!"	雨の日のおむかえだゾ
75	207	"I Run Away with Lucky!"	シロと一緒にカケオチするゾ
75	207	"Pottery Whattery!"	とーげいに挑戦するゾ
75	207	"Mom Goes Bargain Card Cuckoo!"	母ちゃんはポイント好きだゾ
76	209	"Dueling Grampas!"	九州のじいちゃん達が来たゾ
76	209	"A Double Gramps Day!"	二人のじいちゃんと出かけるゾ
76	209	"Boss-Man Shin-Chan!"	オラはサラリーマンしんのすけだゾ
77	107	"Kindergarten Camp-Out!"	夏休みキャンプだゾ
77	107	"Ghosts in the Woods!"	キャンプで肝だめしだゾ
77	107	"A Lotta Yellin' Over Melon!"	メロンで悩んじゃうゾ
78	118	"We Got a Fax Machine!"	FAXはおもちゃだゾ
78	118	"I Hassle Tubasso!"	オラは天才画家だゾ
78	118	"I Broke My Leg!"	オラの足がこわれたゾ
79	173	"Mom's Graduation Party!"	母ちゃんの成人式だゾ
79	173	"The Heater's Broke!"	こたつから出ないゾ
79	173	"Dad Gets a New Suit!"	父ちゃんとデパートだゾ
80	228	"I Missed the Bus Again!"	きょうもバスに乗りおくれたゾ
80	228	"We're All Late!"	なかなかお出かけできないゾ
80	228	"Goin' Crazy with Daisy!"	母ちゃんの苦労はたえないゾ
81	161c	"Mom Learns to Golf!"	母ちゃんのゴルフ体験だゾ
81	161a	"I'm in the Peewee Olympics!"	運動会で活やくだゾ
81	172a	"I'm Tired of Tofu!"	おモチはあきたゾ
82	177a	"Miss Bono Comes for Lunch!"	おねいさんをご招待だゾ
82	195b	"Dori's Got a Dinner Date!"	よしなが先生うれし泣きだゾ
82	195c	"Dad Sees the Dentist!"	歯医者さんはこわくないゾ
83	261a	"I Run an Errand!"	オラのおつかいは大メーワクだゾ
83	261c	"Gimme Them Donuts!"	お風邪をひいてもおつやは欲しいゾ
83	262a	"Daisy Gets a Haircut!"	ひまわりの髪を切るゾ
84	78	"I Knit a Sweater!"	セーターを編むゾ
84	78	"Ridin' the Rush-Hour Train!"	満員電車に乗るゾ
84	78	"I Go to Work with Dad!"	父ちゃんの会社で遊ぶゾ
85	138	"I Find a Snake!"	かわいいシロへびだゾ
85	138	"We Stay at a Hotel!"	一流ホテルの夜だゾ
85	138	"A Day at Rancho Muchacho!"	アクションランドで遊ぶゾ
86	177b	"We Go Rollerblading!"	ローラー初すべりだゾ
86	177c	"Rollerblading with the Gang!"	ローラーで対決だゾ
86	262b	"We Go to the Thrift Store!"	リサイクルショップに行くゾ
87	242a	"Tickets for the Train!"	切符を買うのも行列だゾ
87	242b	"We Take a Train Trip!"	満員こまちで秋田へ行くゾ
87	262c	"We Give a Party!"	野原家のパーティーを開くゾ
88	165c	"Mitsy's Mis-steak!"	高級ステーキ肉を買うゾ
88	166a	"Shinny Baba and the Thieves!"	オラと3人の盗賊だゾ
88	166c	"Fixing Up Lucky's House!"	シロの家を改築だゾ
89	169b	"I Work at the Bookstore!"	立ち読みは許さないゾ
89	169c	"Mom's Secret Cash Stash!"	ヘソクリは秘密だゾ
89	178a	"I'm Going to Miss Bono's!"	おねいさんちへ行くゾ
90	178c	"I Find a Lost Dog!"	たずね犬をさがすゾ
90	192b	"I Want an Autograph!"	有名まんが家のサインが欲しいゾ
90	192c	"I Learn CPR!"	人工呼吸をならうゾ
91	287a	"Superstar Daisy!"	ひまわりの将来に期待するゾ
91	288c	"The Incredible Toenail Roller!"	おそうじ道具で遊んじゃうゾ
91	289c	"Dad's Tape Trouble!"	父ちゃんのないしょのビデオだゾ
92	286b	"The Case of the Strawberry Shortcake!"	ケーキのうらみはこわいゾ
92	286c	"Mom's Locked Out!"	ベランダにしめ出された母ちゃんだゾ
92	284c	"The Air Conditioner's Broken!"	エアコンがこわれちゃったゾ
93	299a	"Plaque's Back!"	アクション仮面のプレゼントだゾ
93	299c	"I Go to the Car Wash!"	コイン洗車場に行くゾ
93	284b	"Brain Freeze!"	夏はやっぱりかき氷が食べたいゾ
94	295a	"Bo Wins a Prize!"	ボーちゃんは埼玉一の園児だゾ
94	296a	"I Got a Magic Thermos!"	オラと魔法の魔法ビンだゾ
94	296c	"I'm a Cat-Sitter!"	あずかった猫で大さわぎだゾ
95	291a	"We Play Airplane!"	父ちゃんとヒコーキごっこだゾ
95	293c	"I Dig Potatoes!"	おイモ掘りに行くゾ
95	294b	"Cosmo Loves Hinky Pinky!"	風間君の好きなアニメキャラだゾ
96	302a	"Hangin' with Daisy!"	オラとひまわりの兄妹愛だゾ
96	302b	"Our Rocks Rock!"	おもしろ石を探すゾ
96	303a	"Uma Digs the Bone-Man!"	デートに燃えるまつざか先生だゾ
97	303b	"Killer Angel vs. Babezilla!"	紅さそり隊の女子プロレスだゾ
97	304b	"Cosmo's Best Buddies!"	オラと風間くんは大親友だゾ
97	304c	"Assault and Batteries!"	乾電池でパニックだゾ
98	305b	"Breakin' the Ice!"	寒い朝は氷で遊んじゃうゾ
98	306b	"Girl Gang in Disguise!"	紅さそり隊の着ぐるみバイトだゾ
98	310a	"Daisy's Secret Stash!"	ひまわりの（秘）コレクションだゾ
99	313a	"Me and My Posse!"	ひまわりはオラの子分だゾ
99	314a	"I Feel Pretty!"	オラもお化粧できれいになるゾ
99	317b	"The Cupid-Killer Curse!"	別れる運命のまつざか先生だゾ
100	318a	"Grampa Goes for Miss Bono!"	じいちゃんは恋のライバルだゾ
100	319b	"Cosmo's Day of Beauty!"	風間くんのオシャレにつきあうゾ
100	319c	"I'm an Asternaut!"	スペースシャトルに乗るゾ
101	320b	"Dad Buys a Present!"	口紅はわざわいのもとだゾ
101	320c	"Lucky Bit Daisy!"	シロがひまわりをかんだゾ
101	323b	"Miss Agnes Hates Heights!"	上尾先生は高いところがこわいゾ
102	333a	"I'm Dumpin' Daisy!"	ひまわりと絶交だゾ
102	333b	"Superdog Lucky!"	名犬シロの入隊訓練をするゾ
102	334b	"Daisy Goes to Kindygarten!"	ひまわりの一日幼稚園だゾ
103	337b	"I Go to Babe College!"	女子大生の学園祭は楽しいゾ
103	336a	"My Old Car!"	おもちゃの車で大暴れだゾ
103	338b	"I Meet Daredevil Debbie!"	マリーちゃんの撮影を見学だゾ
104	339a	"Stuck-Up Sally!"	嵐を呼ぶ園児・酢乙女あい登場だゾ
104	340b	"Stuck-Up Sally!"	あいちゃんのミリョクには逆らえないゾ
104	339b	"Max Loves Sally!"	恋のとりこのマサオくんだゾ
104	342b	"I Fight a Love Duel!"	風間くんと恋の決闘だゾ

=== Gloman Korean-made dub ===
24 episodes were dubbed in English in South Korea and released on learn English VCDs and VHS tapes.

English episode no.	Japanese episode no.	Name in English Korean Japanese (kanji)
1	85a	"I want to change my hairstyle." 머리 모양을 바꿔요 オラ髪形を変えるゾ
1	88c	"Let's eat bacteria." 티슈로 장난하면안돼요 おモチはおいしいゾ
1	107b	"Courage test camp" 짱구가 감기에 걸렸어요 やっぱりカゼをひいたゾ
2	99a	"It's fun riding a bicycle to kindergarten" 자전거 타고 유치원 가기는 재밌어 自転車通園楽しいゾ
2	82a	"Waking up Zzang-gu" 짱구 깨우기 작전 チコク防止作戦だゾ
2	85c	"Housewarming visit to dad's boss" 과장님 댁 집들이 課長の家は新築だゾ
3	98	"Putting the clothes in order" 옷 정리 衣がえをするゾ
3	98	"Beef for lunch" 점심은 갈버 ランチは焼き肉だゾ
3	98	"It's fun going to the racecourse" 경마장은 재밌다 競馬場はおもしろいゾ
4	158b	"Go catch dad" 아빠를 추적하라 父ちゃんを追跡だゾ
4	158c	"Accomplish the delivery mission" 배달의 임무를 완수하라 配達の使命をはたすゾ
4	159c	"Proposal Anniversary" 프로포즈 기념일 プロポーズ記念日だゾ
5	129a	"Fire Prevention" 불조심 火の用心するゾ
5	132a	"The baby is cute" 아가는 귀여워 赤ちゃんは可愛いゾ
5	139b	"White is sick" 흰둥이가 아파요 シロがお病気だゾ
6	134c	"Let's go and see the stars" 별 보러 가자 冬の星座を見るゾ
6	141a	"Let's go for a ride" 드라이브 가자 ドライブに行きたいゾ
6	141b	"I want my own room" 내 방을 갖고 싶어 オラの部屋が欲しいゾ
7	151a	"Playing With A Baby" 아기 랑 놀아요 赤ちゃんと遊ぶゾ
7	152a	"Zzang-gu's Laundry Operation" 짱구의 빨래 지키기 雨ふりザーザーだゾ
7	154a	"Grandfather's Runaway" 할아버지의 가출 じいちゃんの家出だゾ
8	174c	"Mom's Accident" 엄마의 사고 母ちゃんが事故ったゾ
8	175a	"Zzang-gu's Sweet Love" 짱구의 사랑 オラの本気の恋だゾ
8	175b	"Love Confession" 사랑 고백 オラの恋の告白だゾ
9	166a	"Three Thieves And Me" 세 도둑과 나 オラと3人の盗賊だゾ
9	166c	"Remodeling White's House" 흰둥이 집을 고치자 シロの家を改築だゾ
9	167c	"White And Eisenhower" 흰둥이와 아이젠하워 シロの愛情物語だゾ
10	170a	"Zzang-gu's Family Gets A Cold" 감기 든 짱구네 식구들 一家そろって発熱だゾ
10	171a	"The Teacher Gets A Job Offer" 스카웃 제의를 받은 선생님 誘われたまつざか先生だゾ
10	172c	"My Poor Dad" 불쌍한 아빠 父ちゃんのこづかいがないゾ
11	173b	"I Won't Get Out Of The Electric Blanket" 전기 담요 밖으로 나갈 수 없어!! こたつから出ないゾ
11	176a	"Being Home With Dad" 아빠와 단둘이서 父ちゃんと二人だゾ
11	176c	"Get The Panty Thief" 팬티 도둑을 잡아라 おパンツ泥棒が出たゾ
12	177a	"Nami Is Invited" 누 나를 초 대했다 おねいさんをご招待だゾ
12	180a	"I Don't Want To Come Back" 나, 돌아가고 싶지 않아! オラ帰りたくないゾ
12	181a	"A Monkey In Our House" 우 리집에 온 원숭 이 おサルが乱入したゾ
16	194b	"Cheer Up, Cheolsu!" 철수야, 힘내! 風間君が恋しちゃったゾ
16	194c	"Cheolsu Is Falling In Love" 사랑에 빠진 철수 恋する風間君をお助けするゾ
16	195b	"Teacher's Happy Day" 선생님의 기쁜날 よしなが先生うれし泣きだゾ
20	198a	"Pretending To Be Refined Is Too Hard" 고상 떨기는 너무 힘들어 お上品はキュークツだゾ
20	199c	"At The Park With Dad" 아빠와 공원에서 父ちゃんと公園で遊ぶゾ
20	200b	"Dad Gets A Love Letter" 러브레터를 받은 아빠 ラブレターで災難だゾ
24	216b	"Where Is My Love?" ? お兄ちゃんだって甘えたいゾ
24	203a	"A Baby Comes To Our House!" ? 赤ちゃんのお帰りだゾ
24	203c	"Sleepy! Sleepy! Sleepy!" ? 眠くて眠くて眠たい一日だゾ

=== Daekyung Korean-made dub ===
12 segments of episodes were dubbed in English in South Korea and released on learn English VCDs and DVDs.

Japanese episode no.	Name in English Korean Japanese (kanji)
128c	"The ski trip trouble" 스키장 대소동 ゲレンデは大さわぎだゾ
129c	"Rice cakes are yummy" 티슈로 장난하면안돼요 おモチはおいしいゾ
130c	"Zzang-gu has a cold" 짱구가 감기에 걸렸어요 やっぱりカゼをひいたゾ
131a	"Girl friends are too hard" 여자친구는 어려워 おデートをするゾ
131b	"Women pro-wrestling match" 티슈로 장난하면안돼요 女子プロレスのファンだゾ
131c	"Let's clean snow!" 눈을치우자 雪かきは楽しいゾ
133b	"Let's go buy a purse" 복주머니 사러가자 福ぶくろを買うゾ
133c	"Good luck on the test" 수험생에게 용기를 受験生に気をつかうゾ
134a	"Don't use tissues for fun" 티슈로 장난하면안돼요 ティッシュで遊ぶゾ
136a	"Eating with manners" 식사예절은 어려워 食事のマナーは厳しいゾ
136b	"Please Sign the book" 아줌마 서명해 주세요 回らん板をまわすゾ
142a	"Mom the model driver" 엄마는 모범운전사 母ちゃんは運転免許がないゾ

=== Funimation dub ===
Shin Chan is an American adaptation of the Japanese anime television series Crayon Shin-Chan. It was produced by Funimation with a total of 78 episodes. 6 episodes were aired on Cartoon Network's Adult Swim programming block starting on August 21, 2006, and the rest of the 20 episodes of season 1 aired in 2007. Season 2 aired on Adult Swim in 2008. A third season was produced and released to the Hulu/FunimationNow services in 2011.

The series used slightly modified Japanese names of most of the major characters (except for Kazama, who is renamed Georgie Prescott, and Nene, who is renamed Penny Milfer). Episode segments were selected from different Japanese episodes, and scripts rewritten and localized. The show focused on more mature themes and dark humor, and was described as more of a "gag dub".

All three seasons, 26 episodes per season, have also been released on DVD. Season 3, released in 2011, culminated in the official finale, effectively ending the Funimation series. As of October 2025, Discotek Media has released the complete series on a 2 disc Blu-ray set.

The opening theme is "Shin-chan Theme" which is a shortened version of the third opening theme in the Japanese show. The closing theme is "Party Join Us", and is based on the fifth ending theme from the Japanese show. It is sung in English by voice actress Brina Palencia.

==== Series overview ====
Season	Episodes	Originally released	
Season	Episodes	First released	Last released
1	26	August 21, 2006	December 18, 2007
2	26	April 13, 2008	December 14, 2008
3	26	May 27, 2011	September 27, 2011

==== Season 1 (2006–2007) ====
No. overall	No. in season	Title	JP ep no.	U.S. airdates
1	1	"Pee Strike!"	374b / 379b / 456c	August 20, 2006
Episodes: "Shin's Allowance", "A Very Wrong Engagement", "Loopy in the Sky with Demons"
2	2	"To Be a Man..."	374c / 392b / 382a / 377a	August 21, 2006
Episodes: "The Brotherhood of the Groveling Allowance", "Action Bastard Says, 'Put Your Mouth on a Sausage!' ", Hima Nohara in 'Laundry Quandary!' ", "Ench-Man Episode 1: Ench-Man Begins"
3	3	"Safe as a Dry Hump"	378a / 392a / 380a / 379a / 381a	August 18, 2006
Episodes: "Ench-Man Episode 2: Ench-Man Returns!", "Ai Needs a Hero!", "Ench-Man Episode 3: Ench-Man Forever", "Hima Nohara in 'The Creeping Terror!' ", and "Ench-Man Episode 4: Death to the Franchise!"
4	4	"Get Your Hands Off My Happy Cake!"	390a / 390b / 391b / 425a	August 23, 2006
Episodes: ""The Unbearable Sadness of Being (the Happiness Bunny)", "A Fistful of Bunny!", "Curious Georgie Goes to the Zoo", "Action Bastard Busts a Move!"
5	5	"Gigantic One-Eyed Monster"	380c / 410a / 389b	August 27, 2006
Episodes "Needle Mania", "Sister Pact", "A Bootyful Day in the Neighborhood"
6	6	"Gum Is a Good Food to Eat"	381c / 385b / 385c	August 28, 2006
Episodes: "Lactose Overdose!", "Meet the Parasites", "Race for your Life, Georgie Brown!"
7	7	"A Mutha [Bleep]ing Bunny!"	383a / 382b / 472c	April 17, 2007
Episodes "Monkey See, Monkey Poo", "The Dart of War", "Happiness Bunny's Revenge"
8	8	"The Shin Must Poop On..."	393a / 384a / 395b	April 18, 2007
Episodes "Blinging Up Baby", "Hima Nohara in 'How Far Will You Go to Get Juice?' ", "House of Whacks", and "It's the End of the Show as We Know It"
9	9	"Shady Real Estate Office, Ho!"	396b / 397a / 397b	April 22, 2007
Episodes: "Hiro of the Hunt", "Movin' on Down", "A Family that Sleeps Together..."
10	10	"Can't Abort 'Em When they're Not Yours"	398a / 398b / 399a	April 23, 2007
Episodes: "By Dawn's Early Fight", "Bug Thy Neighbors", "Spin Georgie"
11	11	"Irregular Tampons on Sale!"	399b / 400a / 400b	April 24, 2007
Episodes: "Little Morphin' Tranny!", "A Bicycle Built for Poo!", and "The Young and the Eggless"
12	12	"Get Yours, or Die!"	402a / 412a / 406a	April 25, 2007
Episodes: "No Guts, No Glory Hole!", "Action Bastard Says, 'Put Your Hands on My Rod!' ", "The Parasites Are Back!"
13	13	"Swimming, Diving, Scuba Team"	408a / 420a / 380b	April 29, 2007
Episodes: "Everybody, Get Naked!", "White Men Can't Dump", "The Cucumber-Sucking Monster"
14	14	"More of a "Snug" than a "Magnum""	377b / 407a / 418a	May 13, 2007
Episodes: "Untrue Romance?", "The Corpse Whisperer", "Concerto in the Key of Butt-Minor"
15	15	"In the Interest of Increased Ratings..."	406b / 410b / 457a	May 14, 2007
Episodes: "The Itzy Mitzi Spider", "Rainal Leakage", "Shin Chan: The Page One Rewrite!"
16	16	"Sticky's My Favorite Flavor"	411a / 426a / 485c	May 15, 2007
Episodes: "Pink Eye and the Red-Hot Doc", "Door Jam", and "The Adventures of Super Pooper"
17	17	"OK, But I'm a Power Bottom"	376a / 413b / 428b	May 16, 2007
Episodes: "Let's Get Slothed!", "Let's Act Crazy!", "Stakeout of the Closet"
18	18	"The Girls of 34C"	414a / 423a / 431b	May 20, 2007
Episodes: "Break Yo Mama's Back", "Hellion Crawler Baby", "Guess Who's Slumming to Dinner"
19	19	"The Herpes Effect"	437c / 441b / 455a	May 21, 2007
Episodes: "The House Is Officially Unblown!", "Can't Elope", "Whiteface Charcoalpants"
20	20	"Gratuitous Child Nudity"	438a / 475a / 475b	May 22, 2007
Episodes: "Bed, Bath and Pooed On!", "Planet of the Dogs!", and "Planet of the Dogs 2: Holy Shih Tzu!"
21	21	"At Least They Pay for the Ouchie..."	468c / 473a / 488c	December 9, 2007
Episodes: "Penny's Mom's Great Escape", "Between A Rock and a Tard Face", and "Happiness Bunny's Revenge's Revenge"
22	22	"Damn You, Telepathy!"	452b / 372a / 372b / 374a	December 10, 2007
Episodes: "Fatboy Shin! - Chicks don't dig fatties", "How I Went Down Under with my Kindergarten Teacher!", "How I Went Down Under with my Kindergarten Teacher: Part 2!", "Ench's Angels"
23	23	"Your IQ's Like 5, Right?"	special41c / 412b / 482b	December 11, 2007
Episodes: "Mom's Supervillain Super Crush!", "Girls Just Wanna Have Husbands", and "Melvin's Coming to Dinner"
24	24	"Stop Referencing the Show!"	505b / 440a / 404b	December 12, 2007
Episodes: "The Ench Stroke", "Pupin the Turd" and "The Fifth Beetle"
25	25	"Condescending Spanish for Heiresses"	424b / 435b / 484a	December 13, 2007
Episodes: "The Miseducation of Maso's Will", "The Horrible Secret of Count Ench the Magnificent", and "Ai Ya Yi!"
26	26	"Gratuitous Grandparent Nudity"	454a / 454b / 454c	December 16, 2007
Episodes: "The Grandfathers Part I", "The Grandfathers Part II", "The Grandfathers Part.. Sofia Coppola Can't Act"

==== Season 2 (2008) ====
No. overall	No. in season	Title	JP ep no.	U.S. airdates
27	1	"Shin Wars"	special18a / special18e / special18h	April 11, 2008
A parody of the Star Wars original trilogy: "Shin Wars:Episode IV - A Poo Hope!", "Shin Wars: Episode V - The Empire Likes Sprack!", "Shin Wars: Episode VI - Re-turd of the Hentai!"
28	2	"The Stalker Song"	440c / 463b / 233a	April 18, 2008
Episodes: "Kindergarten Pop!", "The Secret Life of Georgie!", and "Action Bastard Says, 'Give Yourself the Shaft!' "
29	3	"Double Fried Flavor"	441c / special22a	April 25, 2008
Episodes: "The Drinky Hiro Show!", "Trading Faces!", and "Trading Faces! Part 2!"
30	4	"Miscarriage Return Policy"	416a / 449a / special23b	May 2, 2008
Episodes: "Tot for Teacher?", "Nice Day for a Whitey Wedding!", "Little Kids Drinking Beer!"
31	5	"Lucky Bastard Fever!"	503b / 494a / 166b	May 9, 2008
Episodes: "Mr. Penny Builds Her Dream House!", "Blowing Me Softly!", and "Lucky Bastard Fever: Episode 1 - Rise of the Pecker!"
32	6	"It's Actually Better for Anal"	491 / 171b	May 16, 2008
Episodes: "Super Happy Fun Time American School Presents: Winter Blunderland!", "Winter Blunderland Part 2", and "Lucky Bastard 2: Inflatable of Doom!"
33	7	"Tummy Clock Says It's Three"	500a / 466c / 174b	May 23, 2008
Episodes: "It Puts the Lotion on the Baby!", "Dildor of Destiny!", and "Lucky Bastard Fever: Episode 3 - Secret of the Bastard!"
34	8	"Green Like Good Boy Pills"	442b / 442c / 178b	June 1, 2008
Episodes: "Ass Got Breezy Being Green!", "Summer Baby!", and "Lucky Bastard Fever: Episode 4 - Fear the Money Shot!"
35	9	"AIDS Is Hilarious"	457c / 502c / 181c	June 7, 2008
Episodes: "Miss Katz Has the AIDS!", "Hos Think They Can Dance!", and "Lucky Bastard Fever: Episode 5 - Gang-Bang, Victorious!"
36	10	"How to Bury a Smack-Addict Clown"	427b / 431a / 429b	June 13, 2008
Episodes: "Crash, Test Dummy!", "Makeup, Little Penny!" and "Fairly Bad Things!"
37	11	"The Emperor's Love"	456a / 444c / 453b	June 20, 2008
Episodes: "The Boy Scouts of Japan!", "The Not-So-Last Temptation of Hiro!", and "Cupid's a Slut!"
38	12	"Her Little Gang-Bang Miracles"	499b / 493b / 442a	June 29, 2008
Episodes: "The Widow Breaker!", "Whitey's Man Burden!", and "Look Who's Stalking!"
39	13	"Childrens Were Our Future"	131b / 452c / 458a	July 5, 2008
Episodes: "Wrestlewomania!", "Wet Dreams May Come!", "Shin chan: The High School Years: Episode 1 - Shin-derella-chan!"
40	14	"Shin Chan: The High School Years"	459a / 460c / 461c	July 12, 2008
Episodes: "Shin chan: The High School Years: Episode 2 - Raging Bull Shin!", "Episode 3 - Million Dollar Boo-by!", and "Episode 4 - The Grade Nine Hope!"
41	15	"Tell the Cops She Looked Eighteen"	253b / 450a / 474a	July 19, 2008
Episodes: "Action Bastard Says, 'I've Got You, Crabs!' ", "Whitey Flight!", and "Fragile Rock!"
42	16	"I Can't Find Your %*#&ing Legs"	429a / 430a / 430b	July 26, 2008
Episodes: "Admission: Impossible!" "Yu Like Me, Yu Really Like... Right? (A Play in Two Acts!)", and "Yu Like Me, Yu Really Like Me... Right? (Act 2!)"
43	17	"An Angel Gets Its Period"	450b / 446c / 469c	August 1, 2008
Episodes: "Along Came a Rider!", "Sleepin' It Real!", "Anything You Kendo, I Kendo Better!"
44	18	"Unlicensed Therapy"	494c / 449b / 470b	August 8, 2008
Episodes: "A Penny for Your Thoughts and Suicidal Tendencies!", "It's Raining Shin!", "Dildor, Sword Receiveth!"
45	19	"A Total Jack Barnes Move"	493c / 500b / 448a	August 23, 2008
Episodes: "The Kiss of Debt!", "Shinja Gaiden!", "Grandfather Knows Best!"
46	20	"Gonna Need More Fingers"	448b / 449c / 472a	August 31, 2008
Episodes: "In Case You Forgot: Grandfather Knows Best", "Pooper Tutor!", and "Trials of Falsemother!"
47	21	"Sexy-Ass Wild Fartin' Cowboy"	419a / 419b / 464a	September 4, 2008
Episodes: "Sh!tty Kickers!", "Sh!tty Kickers 2: The Legend of Girlie Gold!", "The Rise and Fall of Georgie Prescott the Third's Reich!"
48	22	"Morning Vacuuming"	277a / 476	November 8, 2008
Episodes: "Penny's Mom Abhors Shin!", "Beezledrop Returns!", "Beezledrop Returns: Part 2!"
49	23	"Unfortunately for You, I Had Ribs"	462 / 500c / 421b	November 15, 2008
Episodes: "Gotta Gotta Hiccup to Get Down!, "Daddy's Day Scare!", and "Running (to) Mate!"
50	24	"Domestic Abuse Isn't That Funny"	495b / 499c / 481b	November 29, 2008
Episodes: "The Joke Stops Here!", "Book 'em, Shin-o!", and "Disciples for the Truthery!"
51	25	"Box for Hire?"	490b / 447a / 496a	December 6, 2008
Episodes: "The Loser Can't Lose It 'Cause He Lost It So He Loses It", "Lunch Flake!" and "Bitey of Evidence"
52	26	"The Epicish Battle Commenceth!"	492	December 14, 2008
Episode: "The Epicish Battle Commenceth!" 3-part episodes where Shin participates in a tournament

==== Season 3 (2011) ====
After Adult Swim dropped the broadcasting rights to Shin Chan, this season was made available on Hulu, FunimationNow and on home media. The first four episodes were released on Hulu on May 31, 2011, and every Friday through July 26. The first 13 episodes were released by July 26, 2011. The second 13 episodes were released on September 27, 2011.

No. overall	No. in season	Title	JP ep no.	U.S. release dates
53	1	"The After-Breakfast Enema"	507c / 515a / 508a	May 31, 2011
Episodes: "How We Spent Our Two-Year Summer Vacation!", "Anime Is for Children (and Loser Adults)!" and "Soaking Wet Country Club!"
54	2	"The Balls Have Left the Crotchy"	524a / 525a / 523b	May 31, 2011
Episodes: "The Secret Legacy of Ench-Man", "A Star Is Burned", and "Three of Tarts!"
55	3	"Hecilopter Hurts My Brain Part"	511b / 506b / 522a	May 31, 2011
Episodes: "Beater's Digest!", "Love Is (Legally) Blind!", "It's Snot Boo, it's Me!"
56	4	"I Will Not Let You Hurt Hitler"	521b / 520a / 515b	May 31, 2011
Episodes: "Loose Pussy... Cat", "A Brief Satire of the Third Reich's Occupation of France!", "Cupid for Stupid!"
57	5	"Mockery Is So Coastal Elitist"	538a / 531b / 534a	June 3, 2011
Episodes: "Mom's Cavi-Tease", "Beat the New Guy", "Yaz-manian Devil"
58	6	"Running Out of Adult Diapers"	616a / 529a / 541b	June 10, 2011
Episodes: "All the Boo That's Fit to Print", "Bringing up Man-Baby", and "Hate Balls of Fire"
59	7	"Vaginoplasty and a Stepladder"	546b / 600b / 557b	June 17, 2011
Episodes: "Fibromyalgical Mystery Tour!", "Ai'll Be Back!", "The Katz in the Cradle Robbing!"
60	8	"Hold Still While I Glamour You"	526b / 55a / 555b	June 24, 2011
Episodes: "The Real Housewives of Kasukabe!", "True Twilight Diaries, Part 1!", "True Twilight Diaries, part 2!"
61	9	"Food Sex Is Not Your Friend"	536b / 551a / 551b	July 1, 2011
Episodes: "The Truth About Old People", "Miss Polly Amorous", "Earn Nothing Norking from Home!"
62	10	"The Boring Kind of Wet"	533a / 565b / 542a	July 8, 2011
Episodes: "When The Whistlers Blow", "Trains, Trains and Trainomobiles", "Weeding Out The Undesirables"
63	11	"The Upside of Prison Showers"	559a / 532a / 561a	July 15, 2011
Episodes: "Summershine Cleaning", "Georgie Goes Rogue", "The Itzy Bitzy Sister"
64	12	"One, Two, Bunny's Comin for You"	564a / 543a / 578a	July 22, 2011
Episodes: "An Itsy Bitzi Drug Problem!", "Flamernator 3: Elimination Day!", "Happiness Bunny's Revenge's Revenge's Revenge: With a Revengeance!"
65	13	"Losing Your Three-Card"	576b / 567b / 571b	July 26, 2011
Episodes: "Couples Three-Treat!", "Requiem for a Dream Job!", "Cult Fortified!"
66	14	"If You Could Abort Obama, Would You?"	553b / 527b / 545a	September 27, 2011
Episodes: "In Test Anal Fartitude!", "TV Guided Tour!", "Fiery or a Wimpy Kid?"
67	15	"A Blend of Nylon and Panda"	579b / 577	September 27, 2011
Episodes: "Opportunity Knockers!", "Pandamonium, Part 1!", and "Pandamonium, Part 2!"
68	16	"Rubber Gutter Bumpers"	580b / 580a / 546a	September 27, 2011
Episodes: "An Affair to Misremember!", "Shin Chan Origins!", "Oral Hijinks! The Flaming of the Shrew!"
69	17	"Bind, Torture, Make Into Apple Dumplings"	563a / 582b / 574a	September 27, 2011
Episodes: "It's Snot Boo, It's an Alien!", "It's All Relatives", "Kindergarten Chops"
70	18	"Tiny Cock Ring (For Baby Cocks)"	547b / 576a / 594b	September 27, 2011
Episodes: "Mo Bunny, Mo Problems!", "All Your Baseballs Are Belong to Us!", "Everybody Get Naked! (Volume Ten)"
71	19	"Don't Mind the Damp Spot"	605b / 589b / 548a	September 27, 2011
Episodes: "Kids, Stroke Hard at Your Meet!", "Sweat Shop 'til Ya Drop!", "The Audacity of Rope!"
72	20	"Nork Humor"	548b / 591	September 27, 2011
Episodes: "Fight Fire With Firing", "Dolphinfidelity Part 1" and "Dolphinfidelity Part 2"
73	21	"Tell the Stork to Give Me a Fetus"	548b / 601a / 592b	September 27, 2011
Episode "So Long, Fire Well! ", "Don't Tell Mom the Baby Sitter's Dad's Dad!", "Girls Don't Melt!"
74	22	"Monumental Douchebag"	601b / 604a / 611a	September 27, 2011
Episodes: "Kasukabewatch", "Hobby Whores", "Relapse (Don't Do It)"
75	23	"Hardcore Flirting"	611a / 608b / 608a	September 27, 2011
Episodes "Shintervention", "Dog Day Laughtermoon", "Donut Resuscitate"
76	24	"Meanwhile, on the Planet Niptune..."	581b / 605a / 614a	September 27, 2011
Episodes "First, Do No Farming", "Lust in Space", "The Jackson Vibe"
77	25	"Two Corn Dogs at Once"	572a / 618	September 27, 2011
Episodes: "Jam Hanson Presents the Puppets! ", "Little Miss Muff Dive, Part 1", and "Little Miss Muff Dive, Part 2!"
78	26	"This Show Just Jumped the Kappa"	619b / 610a / 610b	September 27, 2011
Episodes: "The Bitzi Saga: Alternate Ending!", "Cancel a Shin!", "Cancel a Shin, Part 2!"

=== LUK Internacional dub ===
English volume	English episode no.	Japanese episode no.	Name in English Japanese (kanji) (rōmaji)
1	8	SPECIAL 18c	"Hey, Himawari Is a Princess!" パフィーも出るの?ひまわりのかぐや姫だゾ (Pafī mo deru no? Himawari no kaguyahime dazo)
1	8	SPECIAL 18d	"Hey, It's Mommy's First Gray Hair!" 母ちゃんにシラガ発見だゾ (Kāchan ni shiraga hakken dazo)
1	8	SPECIAL 18f	"Hey, Michi and Yoshirin Are Moving!" ミッチーヨシリンの引越しだゾ (Mitchīyoshirin no hikkoshi dazo)
1	10	SPECIAL 19a	"Hey, We're Off to Hawaii! (part 1)" 家族みんなでハワイ旅行だゾ 第一章 大当たり (Kazoku min'nade Hawai ryokō dazo daiisshō ōatari)
1	10	SPECIAL 19b	"Hey, We're Off to Hawaii! (part 2)" 家族みんなでハワイ旅行だゾ 第二章 出発 (Kazoku min'nade Hawai ryokō dazo dainishō shuppatsu)
1	10	SPECIAL 19c	"Hey, We're Off to Hawaii! (part 3)" 家族みんなでハワイ旅行だゾ 第三章 巡り合い (Kazoku min'nade Hawai ryokō dazo daisanshō meguriai)
2	1	SPECIAL 14c	"Hey, the Baby Is Coming!" 赤ちゃんが生まれそうだゾ (Akachan ga umare-sō dazo)
2	1	SPECIAL 14d	"Hey, the Baby's Here!" 赤ちゃんが生まれるゾ (Akachan ga umareru zo)
2	1	SPECIAL 14e	"Hey, the Baby Girl Is Born!" 赤ちゃんが生まれたゾ (Akachan ga umareta zo)
2	2	SPECIAL 15b	"Hey, I Know a Cooking Genius!" 少年鉄人と料理対決だゾ (Shōnen tetsujin to ryōri taiketsu dazo)
2	2	SPECIAL 15d	"Hey, It's Time for a Major Cleanup!" みんなで大そうじだゾ (Min'na de ōsōji dazo)
2	2	SPECIAL 15f	"Hey, Looking Back at the Past Year!" 今年一年のふりかえりだゾ (Kotoshiichinen no furikaeri dazo)
2	3	SPECIAL 15a	"Hey, Detective Nohara Comes into Action!" 野原刑事の事件簿だゾ (Nohara keijinojikenbo dazo)
2	3	SPECIAL 15c	"Hey, Detective Nohara Comes into Action! 2" 野原刑事の事件簿2だゾ (Nohara keijinojikenbo 2 dazo)
2	3	SPECIAL 15e	"Hey, Detective Nohara Comes into Action! 3" 野原刑事の事件簿3だゾ (Nohara keijinojikenbo 3 dazo)
2	4	SPECIAL 16a	"Hey, Meet the Shinchan-Terminator!" SF殺人サイボーグだゾ (SF satsujin saibōgu dazo)
2	4	SPECIAL 16e	"Hey, It's New Year With the Matsuzaka Sisters!" まつざか3姉妹のお正月だゾ (Matsu zaka 3 shimai no oshōgatsu dazo)
2	5	SPECIAL 16b	"Hey, It's Time for New Year's Holidays With the Family!" 全員集合のお正月だゾ (Zen'in shūgō no oshōgatsu dazo)
2	5	SPECIAL 16c	"Hey, This Game... Is True To Life!" すごろく勝負で盛り上がるゾ (Sugo ro ku shōbu de moriagaru zo)
2	5	SPECIAL 16d	"Hey, I'm Going Shopping with My Grandpas!" 福袋を買いに行くゾ (Fukubukuro o kai ni iku zo)
2	6	SPECIAL 17a	"Hey, Here Are the Happy Prince and Shinnosuke, the Swallow!" 幸せ王子とツバメのしんちゃんだゾ (Shiawase ōji to tsubame no Shin-chan dazo)
2	6	SPECIAL 17c	"Hey, My Sister Is a Little Rascal!" いたずらヒマリンだゾ (Itazura himarin dazo)
2	6	SPECIAL 17d	"Hey, A Husband for Nene!" ネネちゃんのおムコ選びだゾ (Nene-chan no o Muko erabi dazo)
3	7	SPECIAL 9d	"Hey, Whitey Gets Drunk!" 酔っぱらいシロだゾ (Yopparai shiro dazo)
3	7	SPECIAL 17b	"Hey, We're Going on a Picnic!" お花見に出かけるゾ (O hanami ni dekakeru zo)
3	7	SPECIAL 18–7	"Hey, This Is the Friendship Relay!" 友情のリレーだゾ (Yūjō no rirē dazo)
3	9	SPECIAL 18a SPECIAL 18e SPECIAL 18–8	"Shin chan Wars!" クレヨンウォーズ (Kureyon'u~ōzu) クレヨンウォーズ2 (Kureyon'u~ōzu 2) クレヨンウォーズ3 (Kureyon'u~ōzu 3)
3	11	SPECIAL 19d	"Hey, We're Off to Hawaii! (part 4)" 家族みんなでハワイ旅行だゾ 第四章 フラダンス (Kazoku min'nade Hawai ryokō dazo daiyonshō furadansu)
3	11	SPECIAL 19e	"Hey, We're Off to Hawaii! (part 5)" 家族みんなでハワイ旅行だゾ 第五章 恋心 (Kazoku min'nade Hawai ryokō dazo daigoshō koigokoro)
3	11	SPECIAL 19f	"Hey, We're Off to Hawaii! (part 6)" 家族みんなでハワイ旅行だゾ 第六章 さ・よ・な・ら (Kazoku min'nade Hawai ryokō dazo dairokushō-sa yona-ra)
3	12	SPECIAL 20c	"Hey, Mom and Dad Were Once Teenagers Too!" 青春時代の父ちゃん母ちゃんだゾ (Seishun jidai no tōchan kāchan dazo)
3	12	SPECIAL 23b	"Hey, Statues Are Grateful!" 石像の恩返しだゾ (Sekizō no ongaeshi dazo)
3	13	SPECIAL 20a	"Hey, We're the Three Little Pigs! 1" オラたち三匹の子豚だゾ (Ora-tachi sanbikinokobuta dazo)
3	13	SPECIAL 20b	"Hey, We're the Three Little Pigs! 2" オラたち三匹の子豚だゾ (Ora-tachi sanbikinokobuta dazo)
3	13	SPECIAL 21b	"Going to a Piano Recital" ピアノ発表会に行くゾ (Piano happyōkai ni iku zo)
3	14	SPECIAL 21d	"Hey, We're Going to a Summer House!" 別荘に行くゾ (Bessō ni iku zo)
3	14	SPECIAL 22a	"Hey, I'm Swapping Places With Mommy!" 母ちゃんといれかわちゃったゾ (Haha chi ~yantoirekawachatta zo)
3	14	SPECIAL 22a	"Hey, I'm Swapping Places With Mommy! 2" 母ちゃんといれかわちゃったゾ (Haha chi ~yantoirekawachatta zo)
4	15	SPECIAL 22c	"Hey, It's the Kasukabe Kids Detective Agency!" カスカベ少年探偵社だゾ (Kasukabe shōnen tantei-sha dazo)
4	15	SPECIAL 22c	"Hey, It's the Kasukabe Kids Detective Agency! 2" カスカベ少年探偵社だゾ (Kasukabe shōnen tantei-sha dazo)
4	15	SPECIAL 23b	"Hey, Beer Is for Adults!" ビールは大人の味だゾ (Bīru wa otona no aji dazo)
4	16	SPECIAL 22b	"Hey, I'm Helping a Foreigner!" 外国人をお助けするゾ (Gaikoku hito o o tasuke suru zo)
4	16	SPECIAL 22b	"Hey, I'm Helping a Foreigner! 2" 外国人をお助けするゾ (Gaikoku hito o o tasuke suru zo)
4	16	SPECIAL 23c	"Hey, We're Stuck in Traffic!" 交通渋滞にまきこまれたゾ (Kōtsū jūtai ni makikoma reta zo)
4	17	SPECIAL 23d	"Hey, We Are the Chushingura! 1" クレヨン大忠臣蔵（桜の巻）(Kureyon dai Chūshingura (sakura no maki))
4	17	SPECIAL 23e	"Hey, We Are the Chushingura! 2" クレヨン大忠臣蔵（雪の巻 (Kureyon dai Chūshingura (yuki no maki))
4	18	SPECIAL 24a	"Hey, Here's our story of Grandfather Cherry Blossom!" オラ的な花さかじいさんだゾ (Ora-tekina hanasakajīsan dazo)
4	18	SPECIAL 24c	"Hey, We Want to Go to a Hot Spring!" 福引きで温泉に行きたいゾ (Fukubiki de onsen ni ikitai zo)
4	18	SPECIAL 24d	"Hey, Daddy Is Real Fussy About His Bath!" 温泉にこだわる父ちゃんだゾ (Onsen ni kodawaru tōchan dazo)
4	19	SPECIAL 24b	"Hey, Life Doesn't Always Go As Planned!" 人生は計画どおりにいかないゾ (Jinsei wa keikaku-dōri ni ikanai zo)
4	19	SPECIAL 25a SPECIAL 25b	"Mary, the Mysterious Magician" ふしぎ魔女っ子マリーちゃん☆ (Fushigi majo-kko marī-chan ☆) "Hey, We Watch "Mary, the Magician" on TV!" ふしぎ魔女っ子マリーちゃんだゾ (Fushigi majo-kko marī-chan dazo)
4	20	SPECIAL 25d	"Detective Nohara's Cases: A Star Under Threat" 野原刑事の事件簿 アイドル暗殺計画 (Nohara keijinojikenbo aidoru ansatsu keikaku)
4	20	SPECIAL 25e	"Detective Nohara's Cases: Looking for the Murderers" 野原刑事の事件簿 暗殺団潜入捜査 (Nohara keijinojikenbo ansatsu-dan sen'nyū sōsa)
5	21	SPECIAL 25c	"Hey, I want a Gold Medal!" 金メダルをもらうゾ (Kinmedaru o morau zo)
5	21	SPECIAL 27a	"Treasure Hunter Misae" トレジャーハンターみさえ (Torejāhantā Misae)
5	21	SPECIAL 27a	"Treasure Hunter Misae" トレジャーハンターみさえ (Torejāhantā Misae)
5	22	SPECIAL 10a	"(Shin Chan Special) Hey, I Play Taxi Driver" タクシーごっこするゾ (Takushī-gokko suru zo)
5	22	SPECIAL 26a	"(The Adventures of Brave Pig) Gin Goldfinger" ぶりぶりざえもんの冒険 ゴールドフィンガー銀ちゃん (Buriburi zaemon no bōken gōrudofingā gin-chan)
5	22	SPECIAL 26a	"(The Adventures of Brave Pig) Gin Goldfinger 2" ぶりぶりざえもんの冒険 ゴールドフィンガー銀ちゃん (Buriburi zaemon no bōken gōrudofingā gin-chan)
5	23	372	"Hey, We're Having fun in Australia! 1" オーストラリアは盛り上がるゾ (Ōsutoraria wa moriagaru zo)
5	23	372	"Hey, We're Having fun in Australia! 2" オーストラリアは盛り上がるゾ (Ōsutoraria wa moriagaru zo)
5	23	372	"Hey, We're Having fun in Australia! 3" オーストラリアは盛り上がるゾ (Ōsutoraria wa moriagaru zo)
5	23	391b	"Hey, Himawari Has a Crush On Kazama!" 風間くんはひまわりにモテモテだゾ (Kazama-kun wa himawari ni motemote dazo)
5	24	373	"Hey, We're Still in Australia! 1" オラ達もオーストラリアだゾ (Ora-tachi mo ōsutoraria dazo)
5	24	373	"Hey, We're Still in Australia! 2" オラ達もオーストラリアだゾ (Ora-tachi mo ōsutoraria dazo)
5	24	373	"Hey, We're Still in Australia! 3" オラ達もオーストラリアだゾ (Ora-tachi mo ōsutoraria dazo)
5	24	374a	"Futaba's Angels" フタバエンジェル (Futabaenjeru)
5	25	374b	"Hey, I Want an Allowance!" おこづかいをもらいたいゾ (O kodzukai o moraitai zo)
5	25	374c	"Hey, Daddy Wants an Allowance Too!" 父ちゃんもおこづかいが欲しいゾ (Tōchan mo o kodzukai ga hoshī zo)
5	25	376b	"Hey, Mommy Wants an Electric Bicycle!" 電動自転車が欲しいゾ (Dendō jitensha ga hoshī zo)
5	26	375	"Hey, We're Going on a Picnic! 1" 素敵なピクニックにお出かけだゾ (Sutekina pikunikku ni odekake dazo)
5	26	375	"Hey, We're Going on a Picnic! 2" 素敵なピクニックにお出かけだゾ (Sutekina pikunikku ni odekake dazo)
5	26	375	"Hey, We're Going on a Picnic! 3" 素敵なピクニックにお出かけだゾ (Sutekina pikunikku ni odekake dazo)
5	26	376a	"Hey, We're a Lazy Bunch!" オラ達ナマケモノだゾ (Ora-tachi namakemono dazo)
