= Style of Hiroshi Nohara's Lunch =

Japanese manga series

- First tankōbon volume cover

野原ひろし 昼メシの流儀 (Nohara Hiroshi Hirumeshi no Ryūgi)
- Genre: Gourmet
- Created by: Yoshito Usui
- Manga
- Written by: Yōichi Tsukahara
- Published by: Futabasha
- Imprint: Action Comics
- Magazine: Manga Town (December 4, 2015 – December 5, 2023); Manga Crayon Shin-chan.com (January 2024 – present)
- Original run: December 4, 2015 – present
- Volumes: 15
- Anime television series
- Directed by: Tsukasa Nishiyama
- Written by: Hayashi Mori; Moral
- Music by: Akifumi Tada
- Studio: DLE (animation); Shin-Ei Animation (production)
- Original network: BS Asahi
- Original run: October 3, 2025 – December 19, 2025
- Episodes: 12

Style of Nohara Hiroshi's Lunch (野原ひろし 昼メシの流儀, Nohara Hiroshi Hirumeshi no Ryūgi; lit. 'The Style of Hiroshi Nohara's Lunch') is a Japanese manga series written and illustrated by Yōichi Tsukahara, which is a spin-off of Yoshito Usui's Crayon Shin-chan series, focusing on Hiroshi Nohara, Shin-chan's father and the head of the Nohara family. It was serialized in Futabasha's seinen manga magazine Manga Town from December 2015 to December 2023, before transferring to the series' official website in January 2024. It has been collected in fifteen tankōbon volumes. An anime television series adaptation produced by Shin-Ei Animation and animated by DLE premiered in October 2025.

== Characters ==
Hiroshi Nohara (野原ひろし, Nohara Hiroshi)
Voiced by: Toshiyuki Morikawa
Kawaguchi (川口)
Voiced by: Takuya Masumoto
Haruka Yosugi (四杉遥, Yosugi Haruka)
Voiced by: Kana Ichinose
Akitake Takagiri (高桐あきたけ, Takagi Akitake)
Voiced by: Mahiro Takasugi

== Media ==
=== Manga ===
Written and illustrated by Yōichi Tsukahara, Nohara Hiroshi Hirumeshi no Ryūgi began serialization in Futabasha's seinen manga magazine Manga Town on December 4, 2015. After the final issue of the Manga Town magazine was published on December 5, 2023, the series was transferred to the series' official website in January 2024, where its chapters have been collected into fifteen tankōbon volumes as of July 2026.

| No. | Release date | ISBN |
|---|---|---|
| 1 | October 22, 2016 | 978-4-575-84866-3 |
| 2 | May 12, 2017 | 978-4-575-84971-4 |
| 3 | December 12, 2017 | 978-4-575-85076-5 |
| 4 | July 12, 2018 | 978-4-575-85186-1 |
| 5 | February 12, 2019 | 978-4-575-85271-4 |
| 6 | September 12, 2019 | 978-4-575-85350-6 |
| 7 | August 20, 2020 | 978-4-575-85484-8 |
| 8 | April 12, 2021 | 978-4-575-85564-7 |
| 9 | December 9, 2021 | 978-4-575-85667-5 |
| 10 | September 12, 2022 | 978-4-575-85757-3 |
| 11 | June 12, 2023 | 978-4-575-85852-5 |
| 12 | May 10, 2024 | 978-4-575-85965-2 |
| 13 | March 13, 2025 | 978-4-575-86069-6 |
| 14 | September 11, 2025 | 978-4-575-86135-8 |
| 15 | July 24, 2026 | 978-4-575-86244-7 |

=== Anime ===
An anime television series adaptation was announced on March 12, 2025. It is produced by Shin-Ei Animation, animated by DLE, and directed by Tsukasa Nishiyama, with Hayashi Mori handling series composition and writing the scripts alongside Moral, Koutarou Yamawaki designing the characters, and Akifumi Tada composing the music. Aside from Morikawa as Hiroshi Nohara, the main cast from the Crayon Shin-chan television series reprise their roles in the series. The series aired on BS Asahi from October 3 to December 19, 2025. The opening theme song is "Gohan Tabeyo" (ごはん食べヨ; 'Let's Eat'), performed by Mega Shinnosuke, while the ending theme song is "Kyō no Gohan wa Nan Darō na" (今日のごはんはなんだろな; 'I Wonder What Today's Meal Will Be'), performed by Sabasister.

==== Episodes ====
| No. | Title | Original release date |
|---|---|---|
| 1 | "Curry Style"; Transliteration: "Karē No Ryūgi" (Japanese: カレーの流儀) | October 3, 2025 |
| 1 | "The Style of Tuna Bowl"; Transliteration: "Magurodonburi No Ryūgi" (Japanese: マグロ丼の流儀) | October 3, 2025 |
| 2 | "The Style of Conveyor Belt Sushi"; Transliteration: "Kaitensushi No Ryūgi" (Japanese: 回転寿司の流儀) | October 10, 2025 |
| 2 | "The Style of Hamburgers"; Transliteration: "Hanbāgā No Ryūgi" (Japanese: ハンバーガーの流儀) | October 10, 2025 |
| 3 | "The Style of Deep-Fried Chicken"; Transliteration: "Kara Age No Ryūgi" (Japanese: から揚げの流儀) | October 17, 2025 |
| 3 | "The Style of Okinawa Soba"; Transliteration: "Okinawasoba No Ryūgi" (Japanese: 沖縄そばの流儀) | October 17, 2025 |
| 4 | "The Style of Ekiben"; Transliteration: "Ekiben No Ryūgi" (Japanese: 駅弁の流儀) | October 24, 2025 |
| 4 | "The Style of Kushikatsu"; Transliteration: "Kushikatsu No Ryūgi" (Japanese: 串かつの流儀) | October 24, 2025 |
| 5 | "The Udon Style"; Transliteration: "Udon Suki No Ryūgi" (Japanese: うどんすきの流儀) | October 31, 2025 |
| 5 | "The Pancake Style"; Transliteration: "Pankēki No Ryūgi" (Japanese: パンケーキの流儀) | October 31, 2025 |
| 6 | "The Style of Tonteki"; Transliteration: "Tonteki No Ryūgi" (Japanese: トンテキの流儀) | November 7, 2025 |
| 6 | "The Style of American-Style Chinese Cuisine"; Transliteration: "Amerika-fū Chūkaryōri No Ryūgi" (Japanese: アメリカ風中華料理の流儀) | November 7, 2025 |
| 7 | "The Style of Biryani"; Transliteration: "Biriyani No Ryūgi" (Japanese: ビリヤニの流儀) | November 14, 2025 |
| 7 | "The Style of Squid Ink Pasta"; Transliteration: "Ikasumipasuta No Ryūgi" (Japanese: イカスミパスタの流儀) | November 14, 2025 |
| 8 | "The Style of Wankosoba"; Transliteration: "Wankosoba No Ryūgi" (Japanese: わんこそばの流儀) | November 21, 2025 |
| 8 | "The Style of Kebab Sandwiches"; Transliteration: "Kebabusando No Ryūgi" (Japanese: ケバブサンドの流儀) | November 21, 2025 |
| 9 | "The Style of Rappokki"; Transliteration: "Rappokki No Ryūgi" (Japanese: ラッポッキの流儀) | November 28, 2025 |
| 9 | "The Style of Kamameshi"; Transliteration: "Kamameshi No Ryūgi" (Japanese: 釜めしの流儀) | November 28, 2025 |
| 10 | "The Style of Yakiniku"; Transliteration: "Yakiniku No Ryūgi" (Japanese: 焼肉の流儀) | December 5, 2025 |
| 10 | "The Style of Somen"; Transliteration: "Sō Men No Ryūgi" (Japanese: そうめんの流儀) | December 5, 2025 |
| 11 | "The Style of Roast Beef Bowl"; Transliteration: "Rōsutobīfu Donburi No Ryūgi" (Japanese: ローストビーフ丼の流儀) | December 12, 2025 |
| 11 | "The Style of Paella"; Transliteration: "Paeria No Ryūgi" (Japanese: パエリアの流儀) | December 12, 2025 |
| 12 | "The Style of Okonomiyaki"; Transliteration: "Okonomiyaki No Ryūgi" (Japanese: お好み焼きの流儀) | December 19, 2025 |
| 12 | "The Style of Katsudon"; Transliteration: "Katsudon No Ryūgi" (Japanese: カツ丼の流儀) | December 19, 2025 |
