= Crayon Shin-chan Spin-off =

Japanese anime series

クレヨンしんちゃん外伝 (Kureyon Shin-chan Gaiden)
- Created by: Yoshito Usui
- Original net animation
- Directed by: Michio Mihara
- Studio: Shin-Ei Animation
- Licensed by: Amazon Prime Video (streaming)
- Released: August 3, 2016 – August 23, 2017
- Runtime: 7 minutes
- Episodes: 52

Crayon Shin-chan Spin-off (クレヨンしんちゃん外伝, Kureyon Shin-chan Gaiden) is an anime television series and a spin-off of Crayon Shin-chan. Amazon Japan exclusively streamed the spin-off, with all four volumes consisting of 13 episodes of about seven minutes each.

Unlike the main series, which is set in present-day Kasukabe, each volume of the spin-off explores a different setting and storyline, with the first taking place 100 years in the future aboard a space station.

In May 2022, all four volumes were dubbed into English.

== Episodes ==
=== Series overview ===
Volume	Title	Episodes	Originally aired	
Volume	Title	Episodes	First aired	Last aired
1	Crayon Shin-chan Spin-off: Alien vs. Shinnosuke	13	3 August 2016	26 October 2016
2	Crayon Shin-chan Spin-off: Toy Wars	13	9 November 2016	1 February 2017
3	Crayon Shin-chan Spin-off: Lone Wolf and Family	13	22 February 2017	17 May 2017
4	Crayon Shin-chan Spin-off: O-O-O-No Shinnosuke	13	31 May 2017	23 August 2017

=== Volume 1 (Shin chan Spin-off vol.1 Aliens vs. Shinnosuke) ===
The first volume entitled Crayon Shin-chan Spin-off: Alien vs. Shinnosuke (クレヨンしんちゃん 外伝エイリアンvs.しんのすけ Kureyon Shin-chan Gaiden Eirian vs. Shinnosuke) started streaming exclusively on Amazon Prime Video Japan on August 3, 2016. The first volume became available on December 14 on Amazon Prime Video in various European countries, India, Canada and Australia and on January 12, 2017, worldwide with Japanese audio and English, German, Spanish, French, Italian and Portuguese subtitles as Shin chan Spin-off vol.1 Aliens vs. Shinnosuke.

No. of episodes	English title Japanese	Synopsis	Japanese release date
1	Awakening (目覚め)	10 people and a dog wake up in an unfamiliar spaceship. Why are they there? Nobody knows. Then they hear an eerie roar. What's going on? What will the Nohara family do?	August 3, 2016
2	Passengers (乗客)	100 years had passed while Shinnosuke and the others were hibernating. When they introduce themselves, they discover that the mall's parking lot is the last memory they all have. They cooperate to locate a small ship to get back to Earth.	August 10, 2016
3	Who Did It? (犯人は誰だ？)	The small ship Shinnosuke and Ellen find suddenly explodes. Who blew it up and what for? Was the culprit one of them? Meanwhile, Hiroshi stumbles upon a mysterious door.	August 17, 2016
4	True Identity (正体)	Hiroshi brings back a bottle of 100-year-old Soda Gold. Shinnosuke attempts to drink some out of hunger. Then they find a pillar of sweet jelly-like food. When they tentatively try to eat some...	August 24, 2016
5	Food (食料)	"Mr. Smith" was actually Jiro Jailbreaker, a fugitive sentenced to 800 years in prison. He takes control of all the food. As Takosuke butters up to Jailbreaker and gets some, Hiroshi must beg to be given a small share for his family. Meanwhile, Ellen notices something about the capsules they woke up in.	August 31, 2016
6	10 People and a Dog! (10人と1匹いる！)	Micchi and Yoshirin disappear. Shinnosuke and a few others search for them and find something else. There is one less capsule than the number of humans on board. No human could live for 100 years without being stored in one. Is there an alien among them?	September 7, 2016
7	Proof of Being Human (人間の証明)	Shiro suddenly grows bigger and Jailbreaker suspects that the dog is actually an alien. Hiroshi suggests a way to determine whether someone is human or not. As they take turns taking the test, Shiro changes even further.	September 14, 2016
8	Escape from Prison (脱獄)	Everyone becomes paranoid. Jailbreaker sits before the food with a laser gun in hand. But people become hungry even under such tense circumstances. The situation takes a sudden turn when Shinnosuke mentions the Chocobi snack he saw in a closed-off room.	September 21, 2016
9	Mealtime (食事の時間)	The middle-aged woman among them was actually a robot. She captures Shinnosuke and the others and confines them, but Jailbreaker leads the way and they make a break for it. When Ellen goes to retrieve James, she finds...	September 28, 2016
10	Tonsil (のどちんこ)	The alien called "Buttmen" finally appears before them. The people were brought on board as Buttmen's food. Buttmen attacks them but they manage to escape to the food storage room. There, the robot takes Hima hostage and tells them the surprising truth.	October 5, 2016
11	Butts (おしり)	A "tonsil" robot emerges from the woman-shaped shell. They make the tonsil robot tell them the way to return to Earth. The detonator is activated and the mother ship begins to explode everywhere as they hurry to the cockpit. Led by the tonsil robot, they pass through a chamber where they encounter...	October 12, 2016
12	Buttmen vs. Shinnosuke (オシリアン VS. しんのすけ)	Attacked by Buttmen, they break up and run in different directions. Shinnosuke pulls away from Hiroshi to save Shiro. His parents try to stop him but the boy and his dog are separated from the others by a fire shutter. Meanwhile, Jailbreaker and Takosuke arrive at the cockpit first. Will they take off without the rest of the group?	October 19, 2016
13	To Earth (地球へ)	Shinnosuke and a Buttman face off. The silliest 5-year-old on Earth and the perfect life form clash in a fierce battle of butts. Who will come out victorious? And will Shinnosuke and the others really be able to make it back to Earth?	October 26, 2016

=== Volume 2 (Crayon Shin-chan Spin-off: Toy Wars) ===
The second volume entitled Crayon Shin-chan Spin-off: Toy Wars (クレヨンしんちゃん外伝 おもちゃウォーズ) started streaming on the site on November 9, 2016.

No. of episodes	English title Japanese	Japanese release date
1	Chindarake (ちんだらけ)	November 9, 2016
2	Action Mask Gold (アクション仮面ゴールド)	November 16, 2016
3	Tantrum (DADA)	November 23, 2016
4	Obaan (オバーン)	November 30, 2016
5	Run (逃げろ)	December 7, 2016
6	Middle-Aged Mask (チューコーネン仮面)	December 14, 2016
7	To Chindarake by Train (電車でちんだらけ)	December 21, 2016
8	VS. the Expentables (VS. エクスペンタブルズ)	December 28, 2016
9	The Secret Date (ひみつのデート)	January 4, 2017
10	Seal (ハンコ)	January 11, 2017
11	Action Mask vs. Shinnosuke (アクション仮面 VS. しんのすけ)	January 18, 2017
12	Goodbye, Obaan (さよならオバーン)	January 25, 2017
13	The Finale (最終回)	February 1, 2017

=== Volume 3 (Crayon Shin-chan Spin-off: Lone Wolf and Family) ===
The third volume entitled Crayon Shin-chan Spin-off: Lone Wolf and Family (クレヨンしんちゃん外伝 家族連れ狼 Crayon Shin-chan Gaiden Kazokuzure Ōkami) started streaming on the site on February 22, 2017.

No. of episodes	English title (Japanese)	Japanese release date
1	Butt swordplay (尻剣法)	February 22, 2017
2	Hazumi (はずみ)	March 1, 2017
3	Work (仕事)	March 8, 2017
4	The zillion-dollar woman (一億万両の女)	March 15, 2017
5	Family (家族)	March 22, 2017
6	Mt. Fuji Prefecture (富士山藩)	March 29, 2017
7	True Identity (正体)	April 5, 2017
8	Reunion (再会)	April 12, 2017
9	Armpit swordplay (脇剣法)	April 19, 2017
10	Training (修行)	April 26, 2017
11	To the castle (城へ)	May 3, 2017
12	Secret (秘密)	May 10, 2017
13	Showdown (決戦)	May 17, 2017

=== Volume 4 (Crayon Shin-chan Spin-off: O-O-O-No Shinnosuke) ===
The fourth volume entitled Crayon Shin-chan Spin-off: O-O-O-No Shinnosuke (クレヨンしんちゃん外伝 お・お・お・のしんのすけ) started streaming on the site on May 31, 2017.

No. of episodes	Japanese title	Japanese release date
1	I'm Here! O-O-O-No Shinnosuke (参上！お・お・お・のしんのすけ)	May 31, 2017
2	Go! Monster Busters (出動！ヨーカイバスターズ)	June 7, 2017
3	At School! Monster in the Classroom (登校！教室の怪)	June 14, 2017
4	Hot Spring! Party People (湯けむり！パーリーピーポー)	June 21, 2017
5	Rain is the Serenade for Strays (雨音は迷子のセレナーデ)	June 28, 2017
6	Good Harvest! Forest of Terror (豊作！恐怖の森)	July 5, 2017
7	Part 1! Find Mom (前編！かーちゃんを追え)	July 12, 2017
8	Part 2! Find Mom (後編！かーちゃんを追え)	July 19, 2017
9	Goodbye, And Then (お別れ、そして、)	July 26, 2017
10	Disruption! Monster Panic (崩壊！妖怪パニック)	August 2, 2017
11	Most Evil! Monster President (最凶！妖怪大統領)	August 9, 2017
12	We're Monster Busters (オラたちヨーカイバスターズ)	August 16, 2017
13	Farewell, O-O-O-No Shinnosuke (さらば、お・お・お・のしんのすけ)	August 23, 2017

== Manga adaptation ==
The first volume, "Aliens vs. Shinnosuke", was released as manga in Japan on March 11, 2017 (ISBN 978-4575961911).
