= List of Crayon Shin-chan episodes (2002–2011) =

This is a list of Crayon Shin-chan episodes that aired from 2002 to 2011.

== 2002 ==
No.	Title	Original release date
423	"Quiet Himawari is dangerous" (Japanese: 静かなひまわりは危険だゾ)	January 11, 2002
423	"Nanako Sister’s Kimono" (Japanese: ななこおねいさんの着物姿だゾ)	January 11, 2002
424	"Find a yokan" (Japanese: よーかんを見つけるゾ)	January 18, 2002
424	"Masao-kun's Image Change" (Japanese: マサオくんイメージチェンジだゾ)	January 18, 2002
425	"Action Mask’s new special move" (Japanese: アクション仮面の新必殺技だゾ)	January 25, 2002
425	"A slapstick fuss in the corridor" (Japanese: 廊下でドタバタ大騒ぎだゾ)	January 25, 2002
426	"The door is broken" (Japanese: ドアが壊れちゃったゾ)	February 1, 2002
426	"I want to eat this potato" (Japanese: こっちのおイモが食べたいゾ)	February 1, 2002
427	"I want to see cactus and flowers" (Japanese: サボテンの花が見たいゾ)	February 8, 2002
427	"I can’t sleep before the exam" (Japanese: 試験の前は眠れないゾ)	February 8, 2002
428	"Shopping on a snowy day is hard" (Japanese: 雪の日の買物はたいへんだゾ)	February 22, 2002
428	"The Stakeout Detectives Are Here" (Japanese: 張り込み刑事が来たゾ)	February 22, 2002
429	"A fateful pass announcement" (Japanese: 運命の合格発表だゾ)	March 1, 2002
429	"A big gathering in the apartment" (Japanese: アパートに大集合だゾ)	March 1, 2002
430	"Yu-chan’s audition" (Japanese: 優ちゃんのオーディションだゾ)	March 8, 2002
431	"A make-up artist" (Japanese: メイクアップアーティストだゾ)	March 15, 2002
431	(Japanese: 晩ご飯は内緒だゾ)	March 15, 2002
432	"I will never do it for my bride" (Japanese: 嫁には絶対やらないゾ)	March 22, 2002
432	"Tension including Shinobu tolerant" (Japanese: 張り込みは忍耐だゾ)	March 22, 2002
SPECIAL–31	"Oedo Land Fire (1994) <again>" (Japanese: 大江戸ランド 火の巻だゾ（1994年）〈再〉)	March 29, 2002
SPECIAL–31	"Oedo Land Water (1994) <again>" (Japanese: 大江戸ランド 水の巻だゾ（1994年）〈再〉)	March 29, 2002
SPECIAL–31	"The secret Bo-chan" (Japanese: ヒミツのボーちゃんだゾ)	March 29, 2002
SPECIAL–31	"The drive is throbbing" (Japanese: ドライブはドキドキだゾ)	March 29, 2002
SPECIAL–31	"Red Zukin and Purple Zukin (1997) <again>" (Japanese: 赤ズキンと紫ズキンだゾ（1997年）〈再〉)	March 29, 2002
SPECIAL–32	"Sci-fi murder cyborg (1997) <again>" (Japanese: SF殺人サイボーグだゾ（1997年）〈再〉)	April 20, 2002
SPECIAL–32	"Shiro is a lover" (Japanese: 四郎君に恋人だゾ)	April 20, 2002
SPECIAL–32	"The cherry blossom viewing of the rub villa again" (Japanese: またずれ荘のお花見だゾ)	April 20, 2002
433	"No good and bad" (Japanese: ダメとヤダは禁止だゾ)	April 27, 2002
433	"The house is finally completed" (Japanese: いよいよお家が完成するゾ)	April 27, 2002
434	"Lisa Aspirin is back" (Japanese: リサ・アスピリンが帰って来たゾ)	May 4, 2002
434	"Rice with soup is delicious" (Japanese: つゆかけご飯はおいしいゾ)	May 4, 2002
434	"Hoshi and Deca approach quickly" (Japanese: ホシとデカが急接近だゾ)	May 4, 2002
435	"Take a walk with the supermodel" (Japanese: スーパーモデルとお散歩だゾ)	May 11, 2002
435	"The director’s magic show" (Japanese: 園長先生のマジックショーだゾ)	May 11, 2002
435	"Goodbye Yu-chan" (Japanese: さよなら優ちゃんだゾ)	May 11, 2002
436	"Farewell to Chub rub villa, Chub rub large investigation line" (Japanese: さらばまたずれ荘 またずれ大捜査線だゾ)	May 18, 2002
437	"Come back to my home" (Japanese: 我が家に戻って来たゾ)	May 25, 2002
437	"Shiro is always with me" (Japanese: シロもズーッと一緒だゾ)	May 25, 2002
437	"Start a new home" (Japanese: 新しい家のスタートだゾ)	May 25, 2002
438	"Bath with Dad" (Japanese: 父ちゃんと一緒にお風呂だゾ)	June 1, 2002
438	"Teachers’ joint party" (Japanese: 先生たちの合コンだゾ)	June 1, 2002
438	"I can’t decide on a gift" (Japanese: プレゼントが決まらないゾ)	June 1, 2002
439	"The secret door in the new house" (Japanese: 新しい家のひみつを発見だゾ)	June 8, 2002
439	"Bo-chan’s Important Thing" (Japanese: ボーちゃんの一大事だゾ)	June 8, 2002
439	"I Rely on Mom" (Japanese: 母ちゃんはオラが頼りだゾ)	June 8, 2002
Note: This is the last episode to be animated in cels.
440	"Introducing Nupan IV" (Japanese: ヌパン4世登場だゾ)	June 15, 2002
440	"Clean this time" (Japanese: 今度こそキレイにするゾ)	June 15, 2002
440	"Dad's Kindergarten Visiting Day" (Japanese: 父ちゃんの保育参観日だゾ)	June 15, 2002
441	"This time it’s really beautiful" (Japanese: 今度こそ本当にキレイにするゾ)	June 22, 2002
441	"Masao-kun elopes" (Japanese: マサオくんが駆け落ちするゾ)	June 22, 2002
441	"Midnight Fushigi taste" (Japanese: 真夜中のフシギな味だゾ)	June 22, 2002
442	"A suspicious man appeared" (Japanese: 怪しいオトコが現れたゾ)	July 6, 2002
442	"Go get a frog" (Japanese: カエル取りに行くゾ)	July 6, 2002
442	"Did you come to play?" (Japanese: 遊びに来た?ってカンジだゾ)	July 6, 2002
443	"I’m looking forward to tomorrow’s picnic" (Japanese: 明日のピクニックは楽しみだゾ)	July 13, 2002
443	"I’m a master of obento" (Japanese: オラはおべんとうの達人だゾ)	July 13, 2002
443	"Picnic is a fuss" (Japanese: ピクニックは大騒ぎだゾ)	July 13, 2002
444	"My Tachi Kasukabe Opera Company" (Japanese: オラ達かすかべ歌劇団だゾ)	July 20, 2002
444	"Tutor comes" (Japanese: 家庭教師が来るゾ)	July 20, 2002
444	"Dad's Secret Email Friend" (Japanese: 父ちゃんのヒミツのメル友だゾ)	July 20, 2002
445	"Care for hedges" (Japanese: 生け垣の手入れをするゾ)	July 27, 2002
445	"Uninhabited island survival" (Japanese: 無人島のサバイバルだゾ)	July 27, 2002
445	"Midnight watermelon play" (Japanese: 真夜中のスイカ遊びだゾ)	July 27, 2002
446	"Hot and long day" (Japanese: 暑くて長い一日だゾ)	August 3, 2002
446	"A walk with Shiro is hard" (Japanese: シロとの散歩はハードだゾ)	August 3, 2002
446	"Staying childcare is exciting" (Japanese: お泊まり保育はドキドキだゾ)	August 3, 2002
447	"Welcome everyone" (Japanese: みんなをお迎えするゾ)	August 10, 2002
447	"After all shaved ice in summer" (Japanese: 夏はやっぱりかき氷だゾ)	August 10, 2002
447	"Leave directions" (Japanese: 道案内はおまかせだゾ)	August 10, 2002
448	"Grandpa in Kyushu is tough" (Japanese: 九州のじいちゃんは厳しいゾ)	August 17, 2002
448	"Grandpa stays" (Japanese: じいちゃんがお泊まりするゾ)	August 17, 2002
448	"Same wherever you go" (Japanese: どこへ行っても同じだゾ)	August 17, 2002
449	"Shiro’s wedding" (Japanese: シロの結婚式だゾ)	August 31, 2002
449	"Preparing for a typhoon" (Japanese: 台風の準備だゾ)	August 31, 2002
449	"Part-time job is also difficult" (Japanese: アルバイトも大変だゾ)	August 31, 2002
450	"Shiro’s vaccination" (Japanese: シロの予防注射だゾ)	September 7, 2002
450	"Mom also likes heroes" (Japanese: 母ちゃんもヒーロー好きだゾ)	September 7, 2002
450	"I’ve run out of things to change" (Japanese: 着替える物が無くなっちゃったゾ)	September 7, 2002
451	"I’ll get rid of everything" (Japanese: 何でも片づけちゃうゾ)	September 14, 2002
451	"Shiro and fight" (Japanese: シロとケンカだゾ)	September 14, 2002
451	"Crab tastes like an adult" (Japanese: カニはオトナの味だゾ)	September 14, 2002
SPECIAL–33	"Treasure hunter Misae vinegar maiden clan" (Japanese: トレジャーハンターみさえ 酢乙女家の一族)	September 28, 2002
SPECIAL–33	"Leader Teacher’s strawberry cake (1999) <again>" (Japanese: 組長先生のイチゴケーキだゾ（1999年）〈再〉)	September 28, 2002
SPECIAL–33	"Masao-kun who is good at imitating (1999) <again>" (Japanese: 物まね上手のマサオくんだゾ（1999年）〈再〉)	September 28, 2002
SPECIAL–33	"Petit Petit Himawari 4" (Japanese: プッチプチひまわり4)	September 28, 2002
SPECIAL–33	"Grass baseball tokkun (1997) <again>" (Japanese: 草野球のトックンだゾ（1997年）〈再〉)	September 28, 2002
SPECIAL–33	"Play with an electric massage machine (1999) <again>" (Japanese: 電気マッサージ機で遊ぶゾ（1999年）〈再〉)	September 28, 2002
SPECIAL–33	"Gundam Robo broke (1999) <again>" (Japanese: カンタムロボが壊れたゾ（1999年）〈再〉)	September 28, 2002
452	"Red scorpion corps after a long absence" (Japanese: 久しぶりの紅さそり隊だゾ)	November 2, 2002
452	"I got fat" (Japanese: オラ太っちゃったゾ)	November 2, 2002
452	"Do hair manicure" (Japanese: ヘアマニキュアをするゾ)	November 2, 2002
453	"Preparing to go out is difficult" (Japanese: お出かけの準備は大変だゾ)	November 9, 2002
453	"Nene-chan’s confession" (Japanese: ネネちゃんの告白だゾ)	November 9, 2002
453	"I want to take a nap" (Japanese: 昼寝がしたいゾ)	November 9, 2002
454	"Grandpa’s house in Kyushu is fun" (Japanese: 九州のじいちゃん家は楽しいゾ)	November 16, 2002
455	"Kureshin Unbalance Zone Petit Devil" (Japanese: クレしんアンバランスゾーン プチ悪魔)	November 23, 2002
455	"Stay at Hinabita Hot Spring Inn" (Japanese: ひなびた温泉旅館に泊まるゾ)	November 23, 2002
455	"Mobile phone is convenient" (Japanese: 携帯電話は便利だゾ)	November 23, 2002
456	"Entered the Boy Scout" (Japanese: ボーイスカウトに入ったゾ)	November 30, 2002
456	"Boy Scouts are Fun" (Japanese: ボーイスカウトは楽しいゾ)	November 30, 2002
456	"Kureshin Unbalance Zone Burning Majin" (Japanese: クレしんアンバランスゾーン 灼熱魔人)	November 30, 2002
457	"Kureshin Unbalance Zone Ooo No Shinnosuke" (Japanese: クレしんアンバランスゾーン オオオのしんのすけ)	December 7, 2002
457	"Mom is a cooking teacher" (Japanese: 母ちゃんは料理の先生だゾ)	December 7, 2002
457	"Matsuzaka-sensei’s worries" (Japanese: まつざか先生の悩みだゾ)	December 7, 2002
SPECIAL–34	"Masao-kun’s lost item" (Japanese: マサオ君の落とし物だゾ)	December 21, 2002
SPECIAL–34	"Paid leave gets tired" (Japanese: 有給休暇は疲れるゾ)	December 21, 2002
SPECIAL–34	"I’m a golf coach" (Japanese: オラはゴルフのコーチだゾ)	December 21, 2002
SPECIAL–34	"Mom’s yoga is dangerous (1994) <again>" (Japanese: 母ちゃんのヨガは危険だゾ（1994年）〈再〉)	December 21, 2002
SPECIAL–34	"Courier has a hard time (1994) <again>" (Japanese: 宅配便さんはご苦労だゾ（1994年）〈再〉)	December 21, 2002
SPECIAL–34	"Feeling happy in Hotai (1998) <again>" (Japanese: ホータイでしあわせ気分だゾ（1998年）〈再〉)	December 21, 2002

== 2003 ==
No.	Title	Original release date
458	"This is like youth (Episode 1)" (Japanese: これが!青春らしいゾ（第一話）)	January 11, 2003
458	"Shopping by car with Mom" (Japanese: 母ちゃんと車で買い物だゾ)	January 11, 2003
458	"I want a sports car" (Japanese: スポーツカーが欲しいゾ)	January 11, 2003
459	"This is like youth (Episode 2)" (Japanese: これが!青春らしいゾ（第一話）)	January 18, 2003
459	"Shiro and fight" (Japanese: シロをレンタルするゾ)	January 18, 2003
459	"Aunt Okei’s runaway" (Japanese: おケイおばさんの家出だゾ)	January 18, 2003
460	"I’m full with help" (Japanese: お手伝いでお腹がいっぱいだゾ)	January 25, 2003
460	"Lost in bird watching" (Japanese: バードウォッチングで迷子だゾ)	January 25, 2003
460	"This is like youth (Episode 3)" (Japanese: これが!青春らしいゾ（第三話）)	January 25, 2003
461	"Go buy kerosene" (Japanese: 灯油を買いに行くゾ)	February 1, 2003
461	"Sledding with Masao-kun" (Japanese: マサオ君とそり遊びだゾ)	February 1, 2003
461	"This is like youth (Episode 4)" (Japanese: これが!青春らしいゾ（第四話）)	February 1, 2003
462	"The Hiccoughs Won't Stop" (Japanese: シャックリが止まらないゾ)	February 8, 2003
462	"Soft-soaping Goes Wrong" (Japanese: おねだりはうまくいかないゾ)	February 8, 2003
462	"Keeping Goldfish" (Japanese: 金魚を飼うゾ)	February 8, 2003
463	"Phantom yogurt" (Japanese: 幻のヨーグルトだゾ)	February 15, 2003
463	"Exchange application tickets" (Japanese: 応募券を交換するゾ)	February 15, 2003
463	"Read elegantly" (Japanese: お上品に読書をするゾ)	February 15, 2003
SPECIAL–35	"Dashi Stock Shin-chan" (Japanese: だし取りしんちゃん)	February 22, 2003
SPECIAL–35	"Get pocket tissue" (Japanese: ポケットティッシュをもらうゾ)	February 22, 2003
SPECIAL–35	"Nene-chan is scared when she gets angry (1998) <again>" (Japanese: 怒るとこわいネネちゃんだゾ（1998年）〈再〉)	February 22, 2003
SPECIAL–35	"Shiro was Me (2000) <again>" (Japanese: シロがオラだっただゾ（2000年）〈再〉)	February 22, 2003
SPECIAL–35	"Futaba Angel (2000) <again>" (Japanese: フタバエンジェル（2000年）〈再〉)	February 22, 2003
SPECIAL–35	"Petit Petit Himawari 1 (2000) <again>" (Japanese: プッチプチひまわり1（2000年）〈再〉)	February 22, 2003
SPECIAL–35	"Petit Petit Himawari 2 (2000) <again>" (Japanese: プッチプチひまわり2（2000年）〈再〉)	February 22, 2003
SPECIAL–35	"Petit Petit Himawari 3 (2000) <again>" (Japanese: プッチプチひまわり3（2001年）〈再〉)	February 22, 2003
464	"Kazama-kun will advance" (Japanese: 風間君は出世するゾ)	March 8, 2003
464	"Home visit today" (Japanese: 今日は家庭訪問だゾ)	March 8, 2003
464	"Home visit today" (Japanese: 今日は家庭訪問だゾ)	March 8, 2003
SPECIAL–36	"Flow board Shinnosuke" (Japanese: 流れ板しんのすけだゾ)	April 12, 2003
SPECIAL–36	"Make yakisoba" (Japanese: 焼きそばを作るゾ)	April 12, 2003
SPECIAL–36	"Go to rival kindergarten (1998) <again>" (Japanese: ライバル幼稚園に行くゾ（1998年）〈再〉)	April 12, 2003
SPECIAL–36	"Rival kindergarten children came to scout (1998) <again>" (Japanese: ライバル園児が偵察に来たゾ（1998年）〈再〉)	April 12, 2003
SPECIAL–36	"Confront rival kindergarten children (1998) <again>" (Japanese: ライバル園児と対決するゾ（1998年）〈再〉)	April 12, 2003
465	"Tug of war tournament" (Japanese: 綱引き大会だゾ)	April 19, 2003
465	"Relaxing shopping" (Japanese: のんびりお買い物だゾ)	April 19, 2003
465	"Shut out the bikin" (Japanese: バイキンをシャットアウトするゾ)	April 19, 2003
466	"Leave Gaugetsu" (Japanese: ゲージツを残すゾ)	April 26, 2003
466	"The ideal face of the director" (Japanese: 園長先生の理想の顔だゾ)	April 26, 2003
466	"I'm a Kendo Master" (Japanese: オラは剣の達人だゾ)	April 26, 2003
467	"Boys Be Ambitious" (Japanese: ボーイズ・ビー・アンビシャスだゾ)	May 3, 2003
467	"Matsuzaka-sensei with children" (Japanese: 子連れまつざか先生だゾ)	May 3, 2003
467	"Learn kendo for free" (Japanese: タダで剣道を習うゾ)	May 3, 2003
468	"Masao-kun courage" (Japanese: マサオ君勇気だゾ)	May 10, 2003
468	"Dad’s snacks" (Japanese: 父ちゃんのおつまみだゾ)	May 10, 2003
468	"Absolutely go to bargain" (Japanese: 絶対バーゲンにいくゾ)	May 10, 2003
469	"Misae Nohara, the last-minute housewife" (Japanese: ギリギリの主婦みさえだゾ)	May 17, 2003
469	"Shiro It’s a big strategy of love" (Japanese: 四郎 恋の大作戦だゾ)	May 17, 2003
469	"Sword training is strict" (Japanese: 剣の修行はきびしいゾ)	May 17, 2003
470	"Mysterious glasses" (Japanese: ふしぎなメガネ)	May 24, 2003
470	"First kendo" (Japanese: 初めての剣道だゾ)	May 24, 2003
470	"Last-minute employee Hiroshi" (Japanese: ギリギリの社員ひろしだゾ)	May 24, 2003
471	"Moretsu Attack on Mt. Kasukabe" (Japanese: かすかべ岳にモーレツ アタックだゾ)	May 31, 2003
472	"Musashino Kenta: Introduction to Mom’s Kendo" (Japanese: 武蔵野剣太 母ちゃんの剣道入門)	June 7, 2003
472	"Protect the eggs" (Japanese: たまごをお守りするゾ)	June 7, 2003
472	"Beaten rabbit’s counterattack" (Japanese: 殴られウサギの逆襲だゾ)	June 7, 2003
473	"Bo-chan’s treasure stone" (Japanese: ボーちゃんの宝の石だゾ)	June 14, 2003
473	"Family restaurant and stress" (Japanese: ファミレスでストレスだゾ)	June 14, 2003
473	"I’m Absolutely Byoki" (Japanese: オラは絶対ビョーキだゾ)	June 14, 2003
474	"Masao-kun and Bo-chan broke up" (Japanese: マサオくんとボーちゃんが絶交だゾ)	June 28, 2003
474	"I also want a bed" (Japanese: オラもベッドが欲しいゾ)	June 28, 2003
474	"Mom’s intention savings" (Japanese: 母ちゃんのつもり貯金だゾ)	June 28, 2003
475	"Planet of dog" (Japanese: 犬の惑星)	July 5, 2003
475	"Don’t mess up" (Japanese: 散らかしちゃダメダメだゾ)	July 5, 2003
476	"Musashino Kenta: Introduction to Robert’s Kendo" (Japanese: 武蔵野剣太 ロベルトの剣道入門)	July 12, 2003
476	"Kazama-kun’s premier card" (Japanese: 風間くんのプレミアカードだゾ)	July 12, 2003
477	"Swimming In the Ocean with Nanako" (Japanese: ななこおねいさんと海水浴だゾ)	July 19, 2003
478	"Country life is great" (Japanese: 田舎暮らしはサイコーだゾ)	July 26, 2003
478	"Everyone can’t sleep tonight" (Japanese: 今夜はみんな眠れないゾ)	July 26, 2003
478	"Flowing lunch" (Japanese: 流れるランチだゾ)	July 26, 2003
479	"Misae Nohara, a housewife at the last-minute, pool with children" (Japanese: ギリギリ主婦みさえ 子連れでプール)	August 2, 2003
479	"DoCoMo Ajii" (Japanese: ドコもあじぃ〜ゾ)	August 2, 2003
479	"Doesn’t seem to have a presence" (Japanese: 存在感があるようで無いゾ)	August 2, 2003
480	"Tropical nights are noisy" (Japanese: 熱帯夜はうるさいゾ)	August 16, 2003
480	"Yoshinaga-sensei’s summer vacation" (Japanese: よしなが先生の夏休みだゾ)	August 16, 2003
480	"Musashino Kenta: Dojo Yaburi of the Red Scorpion Corps" (Japanese: 武蔵野剣太 紅さそり隊の道場破り)	August 16, 2003
SPECIAL–37	"Saturday special Nohara Hiroshi Expedition -Follow the legend of golden business cards!-" (Japanese: 土曜スペシャル 野原ひろし探検隊 -黄金の名刺伝説を追え!-)	August 23, 2003
SPECIAL–37	"Last-minute housewife Misae went on a trip" (Japanese: ギギリギリ主婦みさえ 旅行に行きたぁ〜い)	August 23, 2003
481	"Misae Nohara, a housewife at the last-minute, is thrilled on a hot spring trip" (Japanese: ギリギリ主婦みさえ 温泉旅行でドキドキよ)	August 30, 2003
481	"Musashino Kenta vs. Kasukabe Defense Corps" (Japanese: 武蔵野剣太VSカスカベ防衛隊)	August 30, 2003
481	"Lost in car navigation" (Japanese: カーナビで迷子だゾ)	August 30, 2003
482	"Shiro-san SOS" (Japanese: 四郎さんＳＯＳだゾ)	September 6, 2003
482	"Typhoon is coming" (Japanese: 台風が来るゾ)	September 6, 2003
482	"Musashino Kenta: Ryuko’s underwaving love" (Japanese: 武蔵野剣太 竜子の一途な恋)	September 6, 2003
483	"Masao-kun, one in the world" (Japanese: 世界で一人のマサオくんだゾ)	September 13, 2003
483	"Misae Nohara My mistake is your mistake" (Japanese: ギリギリ主婦みさえ 私のミスはあなたのミス)	September 13, 2003
483	"Escort Nanako Sister" (Japanese: ななこおねいさんをエスコートするゾ)	September 13, 2003
SPECIAL–38	"Burglars and tycoons" (Japanese: 空き巣とタイケツだゾ)	September 27, 2003
SPECIAL–38	"Misae Nohara, the last-minute housewife, can’t find any lessons" (Japanese: ギリギリ主婦みさえ 習い事が見つからない)	September 27, 2003
SPECIAL–38	"Pencil Shin-chan Shinnosuke even in elementary school" (Japanese: えんぴつしんちゃん 小学生でもしんのすけだゾ)	September 27, 2003
SPECIAL–38	"Nohara Hiroshi expedition I saw a secretary-only village in an unexplored region!" (Japanese: 野原ひろし探検隊 秘境に秘書だけの村を見た！)	September 27, 2003
SPECIAL–38	"Bo-chan’s love" (Japanese: ボーちゃんの恋心だゾ)	September 27, 2003
484	"Elope with Ai-chan" (Japanese: あいちゃんと駆け落ちだゾ)	November 8, 2003
484	"Shiro’s CM debut" (Japanese: シロのＣＭデビューだゾ)	November 8, 2003
484	"Musashino Kenta: Extreme flow has arrived!" (Japanese: 武蔵野剣太 極端流が来た！)	November 8, 2003
485	"Mom goes to the scenario classroom" (Japanese: 母ちゃんがシナリオ教室に行くゾ)	November 15, 2003
485	"Scenario written by Mom" (Japanese: 母ちゃんが書いたシナリオだゾ)	November 15, 2003
485	"Toilet man is cool" (Japanese: おトイレマンはカッコいいゾ)	November 15, 2003
486	"Nanako’s fiancée" (Japanese: なな子お姉さんの婚約者だゾ)	November 22, 2003
486	"Mom got hooked on a handsome actor" (Japanese: 母ちゃんがイケメン俳優にはまったゾ)	November 22, 2003
486	"Musashino Kenta: Kendo Tournament Special Training" (Japanese: 武蔵野剣太 剣道大会の特訓だゾ)	November 22, 2003
487	"I’m back right now" (Japanese: ただいま工事中だゾ)	November 29, 2003
487	"Good at buttoning" (Japanese: ボタンつけは得意だゾ)	November 29, 2003
487	"Mom’s English conversation" (Japanese: 母ちゃんの英会話だゾ)	November 29, 2003
488	"There is Nanika behind the chest of drawers" (Japanese: タンスの裏にはナニカがあるゾ)	December 6, 2003
488	"Play the train" (Japanese: 電車ごっこをするゾ)	December 6, 2003
488	"Nene-chan’s rabbit talked" (Japanese: ネネちゃんのウサギがしゃべったゾ)	December 6, 2003
SPECIAL–39	"Pencil Shin-chan Do math" (Japanese: えんぴつしんちゃん 算数をするゾ)	December 20, 2003
SPECIAL–39	"Goodbye Ai-chan" (Japanese: さよならあいちゃんだゾ)	December 20, 2003
SPECIAL–39	"Savings can be used" (Japanese: 貯金はつかれるゾ)	December 20, 2003

== 2004 ==
No.	Title	Original release date
489	"Take a photo of your memories" (Japanese: 思い出の写真を撮るゾ)	January 10, 2004
489	"Large sosaku throughout the house" (Japanese: 家中を大ソーサクだゾ)	January 10, 2004
489	"I’m the swordsman Shinnosuke" (Japanese: オラは剣豪しんのすけだゾ)	January 10, 2004
490	"After all it is a kotatsu on a cold day" (Japanese: 寒い日はやっぱりコタツだゾ)	January 17, 2004
490	"Find lost items" (Japanese: 落し物を探すゾ)	January 17, 2004
490	"Special training! Special training! Also special training" (Japanese: 特訓！特訓！また特訓だゾ)	January 17, 2004
491	"Fun ski school" (Japanese: 楽しいスキー教室だゾ)	January 24, 2004
492	"Showdown! Weird Kendo Techniques Grand Assembly" (Japanese: 対決!剣道大会ヘンなわざ大集合)	January 31, 2004
SPECIAL–40	"Dad and Mom swapped" (Japanese: 父ちゃんと母ちゃんが入れ替わったゾ)	February 7, 2004
SPECIAL–40	"Learn table manners" (Japanese: テーブルマナーを身につけるゾ)	February 7, 2004
SPECIAL–40	"Masao-kun is hospitalized" (Japanese: マサオ君が入院だゾ)	February 7, 2004
SPECIAL–40	"Action Mask vs. Baron Flower" (Japanese: アクション仮面対フラワー男爵)	February 7, 2004
493	"Action Mask vs. Baron Flower" (Japanese: アクション仮面対フラワー男爵)	February 21, 2004
493	"Struggle with Shiro" (Japanese: シロに苦労をかけるゾ)	February 21, 2004
493	"Dad is my beloved wife lunch" (Japanese: 父ちゃんは愛妻弁当だゾ)	February 21, 2004
494	"Hair dryer panic" (Japanese: ドライヤーパニックだゾ)	February 28, 2004
494	"Around the age when children want to consult" (Japanese: 子供も相談したい年頃だゾ)	February 28, 2004
494	"My Family will definitely be late" (Japanese: オラん家は絶対遅刻するゾ)	February 28, 2004
495	"Tired of rumbling" (Japanese: ゴロゴロするのは疲れるゾ)	March 6, 2004
495	"Be careful with Nene-chan" (Japanese: ネネちゃんには気を使うゾ)	March 6, 2004
495	"Savings are delicious" (Japanese: 節約はおいしいゾ)	March 6, 2004
496	"Beauty Phantom Beauty Akujo" (Japanese: 美女怪人ビューティーアクージョだゾ)	March 13, 2004
496	"Help Kazama-kun" (Japanese: 風間くんを手伝うゾ)	March 13, 2004
496	"Temptation cake" (Japanese: 誘惑のケーキだゾ)	March 13, 2004
SPECIAL–41	"One grain is missing" (Japanese: 一粒足りないゾ)	April 3, 2004
SPECIAL–41	"I want! Chocolate Rin" (Japanese: ほしいゾ！おチョコりん)	April 3, 2004
SPECIAL–41	"Line up in a procession ramen" (Japanese: 行列ラーメンに並ぶゾ)	April 3, 2004
497 (Special–41)	"Kasukabe: Western in the Wilderness" (Japanese: 荒野のカスカベウエスタンだゾ)	May 1, 2004
498	"Nanako Sister’s part-time job" (Japanese: ななこおねいさんのアルバイトだゾ)	May 8, 2004
498	"Bear’s handkerchief" (Japanese: クマさんハンカチをソーサクするゾ)	May 8, 2004
498	"This is the neighborhood" (Japanese: これがご近所づきあいだゾ)	May 8, 2004
499	"I’m Amanjak" (Japanese: オラ、アマンジャクだゾ)	May 15, 2004
499	"Matsuzaka-woman’s revenge" (Japanese: まつざか女の復讐だゾ)	May 15, 2004
499	"Be quiet in the library" (Japanese: 図書館ではお静かにだゾ)	May 15, 2004
500	"Be quiet in the library" (Japanese: 図書館ではお静かにだゾ)	May 22, 2004
500	"Ninja" (Japanese: 忍者でござるゾ)	May 22, 2004
500	"Play with my Dad" (Japanese: 父ちゃんとむりして遊ぶゾ)	May 22, 2004
501	"Hola! Our Trip to Spain" (Japanese: オーラッ！ スパイン旅行だゾ)	May 29, 2004
502	"My Strawberry" (Japanese: オラのイチゴちゃんだゾ)	June 5, 2004
502	"Aiming for talent" (Japanese: タレントをめざすゾ)	June 5, 2004
502	"Dance special training" (Japanese: ダンスの特訓だゾ)	June 5, 2004
503	"Save money if you buy now" (Japanese: 今買うとおトクだゾ)	June 12, 2004
503	"Anomalous real playhouse" (Japanese: 変則リアルおままごとだゾ)	June 12, 2004
503	"Hey! Taxi" (Japanese: へーい！タクシーだゾ)	June 12, 2004
504	"The walk is delicious" (Japanese: お散歩はオイシイゾ)	June 19, 2004
504	"Make a wood deck" (Japanese: ウッドなデッキを作るゾ)	June 19, 2004
504	"The latest mobile phone is convenient" (Japanese: 最新ケータイは便利だゾ)	June 19, 2004
505	"Is Lara’s Mom a doko?" (Japanese: ララちゃんのママはドコ？だゾ)	July 10, 2004
505	"Mee on the right" (Japanese: 座右のメエ〜だゾ)	July 10, 2004
505	"The grudge of cup ramen is scary" (Japanese: カップラーメンの恨みは恐いゾ)	July 10, 2004
506	"Dad Mom project" (Japanese: パパママプロジェクトだゾ)	July 17, 2004
506	"Glasses are cool" (Japanese: メガネってカッコいいゾ)	July 17, 2004
506	"Supporting Kawaguchi’s love" (Japanese: 川口さんの恋を応援するゾ)	July 17, 2004
507	"Buy easy yosoyuki" (Japanese: やすいよそゆきを買うゾ)	July 24, 2004
507	"Paper robot showdown!" (Japanese: ペーパーロボット対決！だゾ)	July 24, 2004
507	"Tha sea is mufufu..." (Japanese: 海はムフフ･･･だゾ)	July 24, 2004
508	"Everyone goes to the pool" (Japanese: みんなでプールに行くゾ)	August 7, 2004
508	"Park debut companion" (Japanese: 公園デビューのおともだゾ)	August 7, 2004
508	"A walk after the rain" (Japanese: 雨あがりのお散歩だゾ)	August 7, 2004
SPECIAL–42	"Go to Kazama-kun" (Japanese: 風間くんちへ行くゾ)	September 4, 2004
SPECIAL–42	"Kazama-kun Comes Over This Time!" (Japanese: 今度は風間くんが来たゾ)	September 4, 2004
SPECIAL–42	"My Nori Rekisho" (Japanese: オラのりれきしょだゾ)	September 4, 2004
SPECIAL–42	"Micchi’s ex-boyfriend?" (Japanese: ミッチーの元カレ?だゾ)	September 4, 2004
SPECIAL–42	"My lunch is decided by this" (Japanese: オラのお昼はコレに決まりだゾ)	September 4, 2004
SPECIAL–42	"Suddenly the tragedy of Shiro" (Japanese: 突然シロの悲劇だゾ)	September 4, 2004
SPECIAL–43	"Hima, no entry" (Japanese: ひま、お出入り禁止だゾ)	October 16, 2004
SPECIAL–43	"Fishing moat storm is here!" (Japanese: 釣り堀あらし登場！だゾ)	October 16, 2004
SPECIAL–43	"It rains, it’s sunny, it’s cloudy" (Japanese: 降ったり、晴れたり、曇ったりだゾ)	October 16, 2004
509	"Sprinkle doll set" (Japanese: ふりかけ人形セットだゾ)	October 22, 2004
509	"Buy new shoes" (Japanese: おニューの靴を買うゾ)	October 22, 2004
510	"Great Bento" (Japanese: グレイトなおべんとうだゾ)	October 29, 2004
510	"Mom’s nice umbrella" (Japanese: 母ちゃんのステキな傘だゾ)	October 29, 2004
511	"I can’t put out postcards" (Japanese: ハガキが出せないゾ)	November 5, 2004
511	"Take the plunge and throw it away" (Japanese: おもいきって捨てるゾ)	November 5, 2004
512	"Toilet training" (Japanese: トイレトレーニングだゾ)	November 19, 2004
512	"Become a Kamishibaya-san" (Japanese: かみしばいやさんになるゾ)	November 19, 2004
513	"Dad's 24 Minutes" (Japanese: 父ちゃんの24だゾ)	November 26, 2004
513	"Futaba Kindergarten Athletic Meet" (Japanese: ふたば幼稚園大運動会だゾ)	November 26, 2004
514	"The fight of a terrifying woman" (Japanese: おそるべし女の闘いだゾ)	December 3, 2004
514	"Kimono is Beauty Four" (Japanese: 和服はビューティフォーだゾ)	December 3, 2004
515	"Children’s movies are hard" (Japanese: お子様映画はつらいゾ)	December 10, 2004
515	"Is Matsuzaka-sensei finally getting married?" (Japanese: 松坂先生もついに結婚?だゾ)	December 10, 2004
Misae reluctantly takes Shin-chan to a children's matinee and ends up chaperoning some of his kindergarten classmates as well. / English teacher Robert mistakes Ms. Matsuzaka for a ninja and wants to study with her. Misunderstandings arise when Shin-chan "interprets" for him.
516	"I like a cold" (Japanese: オラ、カゼっぽいゾ)	December 17, 2004
516	"I’ll fix it" (Japanese: コッソリ直しちゃうゾ)	December 17, 2004
Shin-chan catches a cold after playing outside naked. Misae does her best to take care of him, but he is not exactly a docile patient. / Masao accidentally destroys Nene's craft project. Can the boys keep her distracted by playing "office" and fix it before she notices?

== 2005 ==
No.	Title	Original release date
517	"I want to eat this for lunch" (Japanese: お昼はコレが食べたいゾ)	January 7, 2005
517	"Warm with Play outside" (Japanese: 外でアソブとあったかいゾ)	January 7, 2005
It's payday, so the Nohara family gets into the car and goes off in search of a restaurant, but every place they try is too crowded. / Dismayed that Shin-chan is just sitting around, Misae tells him to go play outside. He gets involved in playing soccer with Kazama and other friends.
518	"Masao-kun has done it!" (Japanese: マサオくんがやっちゃった!ゾ)	January 14, 2005
518	"Prepare is Ready" (Japanese: 準備はオッケーだゾ)	January 14, 2005
?? / Shin-chan gets a new backpack. Excited to use it, he starts packing for a trip, but the family has no plans to go anywhere for another six months!
519	"Masao-kun's life" (Japanese: マサオ君のカケモチ人生だゾ)	January 21, 2005
519	"Kotatsu's long day" (Japanese: コタツの長い一日だゾ)	January 21, 2005
Shin-chan and friends are playing action hero, but Nene invites them to play house. Masao tries to do both at once. / On a cold winter day, Shin-chan and Hiroshi don’t want to do anything but sit at the heated kotatsu table all day.
520	"Misae detective (deca) innocent school" (Japanese: みさえ刑事（デカ）純情派だゾ)	January 28, 2005
520	"Burning audition" (Japanese: 燃えるオーディションだゾ)	January 28, 2005
Misae plays cops and robbers with Shin-chan and gets caught up in the game, resulting in an embarrassing situation. / Shin-chan’s kindergarten class is going to put on a play. As auditions approach, he and his friends wonder which roles they should try out for.
521	"Picked up a kitten" (Japanese: 子ネコを拾ったゾ)	February 4, 2005
521	"Become an my beauty" (Japanese: オラ美人になるゾ)	February 4, 2005
Shin-chan and his friends find a stray kitten in the park. They try to find it a new home but are unsuccessful. / Shin-chan gets into Misae’s cosmetics and makes up his face. He is so pleased with the result that he tries putting make-up on the dog.
522	"Hana water does not stop" (Japanese: ハナ水が止まらないゾ)	February 18, 2005
522	"Mom makes a cake" (Japanese: 母ちゃんがケーキを作るゾ)	February 18, 2005
Shin-chan has a very runny nose so Misae takes him to an ear, nose and throat specialist, even though he doesn’t want to go. / When Shin-chan hears that other mothers bake cakes, he promises his friends his mother will bake a cake for them -- without asking her.
523	"Joint party" (Japanese: 合コンするゾ)	February 25, 2005
523	"Beware of cute Hima!" (Japanese: かわいいひまにゴ用心!だゾ)	February 25, 2005
Kazama and friends go on a playdate with girls from another kindergarten. They all get along well, but leave it to Shin-chan to cause trouble. / Shin-chan can’t figure out why baby Himawari likes to lick one of his action figures, but he has a plan to stop her.
524	"Thank you sushi" (Japanese: ありがた〜いお寿司だゾ)	March 4, 2005
524	"Teachers' health check" (Japanese: 先生たちの健康診断だゾ)	March 4, 2005
It's payday so the family splurges on some expensive sushi, but a meal with two small children is never easy. / The kindergarten teachers undergo their annual physical. Shin-chan manages to enter the examining room and make a nuisance of himself.
525	"Bento contest" (Japanese: お弁当コンクールだゾ)	March 11, 2005
525	"Answer the interview" (Japanese: インタビューに答えるゾ)	March 11, 2005
The children compete to see who can make the most delicious lunch, but some of the children get help from their mothers. / After Kazama’s mother is interviewed on TV, Misae wants to be interviewed, too. She has Shin-chan pretend to be an interviewer so she can practice.
SPECIAL–44	"I'm a dog!" (Japanese: オラは犬です!だゾ)	April 1, 2005
SPECIAL–44	"There is Nanika behind the chest of drawers (2003) <again>" (Japanese: タンスの裏にはナニカがあるゾ（2003年）〈再〉)	April 1, 2005
SPECIAL–44	"Dad's diet" (Japanese: 父ちゃんのダイエットだゾ)	April 1, 2005
Envious of the way Shiro spends the whole day lying around, Shin-chan decides that he wants to be a dog, but there are disadvantages to a dog’s life. / ?? / ??
526	"Mote Masao-kun" (Japanese: もてもてマサオくんだゾ)	April 22, 2005
526	"I'm tired and rejuvenated" (Japanese: ムリして若返っちゃうゾ)	April 22, 2005
527	"Diet from tomorrow" (Japanese: 明日からダイエットだゾ)	April 29, 2005
527	"Watch TV Asahi" (Japanese: テレビ朝日を見学するゾ)	April 29, 2005
?? / Misae and Shin-chan are touring the TV Asahi studios when Shin-chan raises havoc by intruding on a live broadcast.
528	"Hiroshi's crushing days" (Japanese: ひろしのときめきの日々だゾ)	May 6, 2005
528	"Fluffy Fluffy Fluffy" (Japanese: ふってふってふってだゾ)	May 6, 2005
529	"I love Micchi" (Japanese: アイ・ラブ・ミッチーだゾ)	May 20, 2005
529	"A longing goregous parfait" (Japanese: あこがれのゴージャス・パフェだゾ)	May 20, 2005
530	"Take a walk with Dad" (Japanese: 父ちゃんとお散歩だゾ)	May 27, 2005
530	"I can't use the garage" (Japanese: ガレージが使えないゾ)	May 27, 2005
531	"Dad likes balloons!?" (Japanese: 父ちゃんは風船がお好き！？だゾ)	June 3, 2005
531	"Ageo-sensei will guide you" (Japanese: 上尾先生がご指導するゾ)	June 3, 2005
532	"I'll grate!?" (Japanese: グレてやる！？だゾ)	June 10, 2005
532	"Take turns on your mobile phone" (Japanese: ケータイの番をするゾ)	June 10, 2005
533	"Whistling is huh" (Japanese: 口笛はヒュ〜ゥだゾ)	June 17, 2005
533	"Make okonomiyaki!" (Japanese: お好み焼きを作るゾ！)	June 17, 2005
534	"Transformed into Moe-P" (Japanese: もえPに大変身だゾ)	June 24, 2005
534	"I don't want to see Matsuzaka-sensei" (Japanese: まつざか先生見ちゃいや〜んだゾ)	June 24, 2005
535	"I will sign" (Japanese: サインしちゃうゾ)	July 8, 2005
535	"Himawari goes otolaryngology" (Japanese: ひまわりが耳鼻科に行くゾ)	July 8, 2005
536	"Caring for Mom" (Japanese: 母ちゃんを看病するゾ)	July 15, 2005
536	"Go to a hideaway restaurant" (Japanese: 隠れ家レストランに行くゾ)	July 15, 2005
Misae has a fever, and Shin-chan tries to take care of her, but he only makes things worse. / Misae takes Shin-chan to a “hidden” restaurant. Thinking it’s a “hiding” restaurant, he plays hide-and-seek while the owner and his wife argue.
537	"Troublesome" (Japanese: めんどうくさいゾ)	July 29, 2005
537	"Make stilts and ride" (Japanese: 竹馬作って乗っちゃうゾ)	July 29, 2005
Nobody feels like putting in any effort today. Misae doesn’t want to make a complicated recipe, and Hiroshi lies around on the floor watching TV. / Hiroshi and Shin-chan make a pair of stilts one Sunday morning. They have fun with a hammer and saw but cause trouble when they’re finished.
538	"I want to drink juice" (Japanese: ジュースが飲みたいゾ)	August 5, 2005
538	"Docking with Zuckin!" (Japanese: ズッキンでドッキン!だゾ)	August 5, 2005
A thirsty Shin-chan throws a tantrum while out shopping with Misae, but Misae refuses to spend money on juice. / Misae has toothache and heads to a handsome dentist’s surgery. But she ends up waiting so long in the waiting room that she misses him altogether.
539	"Go to the CD shop" (Japanese: CDショップへ行くゾ)	August 12, 2005
539	"Yukata fireworks display" (Japanese: ゆかたで花火大会だゾ)	August 12, 2005
Ms. Hasuda starts working at a CD store but all she gets are lousy customers. With Shin-chan running around the store, she is even more annoyed. / The Nohara family goes to a fireworks festival. They enjoy the stalls, but soon they’re bickering over everything.
540	"Catch Dorcus hopei" (Japanese: オオクワガタを捕るゾ)	August 19, 2005
541	"Tataki ticket" (Japanese: かたたたき券だゾ)	August 26, 2005
541	"It's hot" (Japanese: あつくるしいゾ)	August 26, 2005
542	"Atsukuru-sensei is here!" (Japanese: あつくる先生、登場！だゾ)	September 2, 2005
542	"Walking date" (Japanese: ウォーキング・デートだゾ)	September 2, 2005
543	"Play soccer" (Japanese: サッカーで勝負だゾ)	September 9, 2005
543	"Himawari is on top" (Japanese: ひまわりがのっけちゃうゾ)	September 9, 2005
544	"You can make an expander!" (Japanese: エキスパンダーできたえるゾ！)	September 16, 2005
544	"Aroma ~ mood" (Japanese: アロマ〜な気分だゾ)	September 16, 2005
545	"Petit Fire Po" (Japanese: プチファイヤー ポだゾ)	September 23, 2005
545	"Make accessories" (Japanese: アクセサリーをつくるゾ)	September 23, 2005
SPECIAL–45	"Sprinkle doll set (2004) <again>" (Japanese: ふりかけ人形セットだゾ（2004年）〈再〉)	October 7, 2005
SPECIAL–45	"Babysitter is left to me" (Japanese: 子守りはオラにおまかせだゾ)	October 7, 2005
SPECIAL–45	"Buy new shoes (2004) <again>" (Japanese: おニューの靴を買うゾ（2004年）〈再〉)	October 7, 2005
SPECIAL–45	"Crayon Shin-chan: Fierceness That Invites Storm! The Battle of the Warring States" (Japanese: クレヨンしんちゃん 嵐を呼ぶ アッパレ!戦国大合戦)	October 7, 2005
546	"Nene-chan bent her belly button" (Japanese: ネネちゃんがおヘソを曲げちゃったゾ)	October 28, 2005
546	"I got matsutake mushrooms" (Japanese: まつたけをもらったゾ)	October 28, 2005
547	"Getting up early is a great deal for Sanbun" (Japanese: 早起きは三文のトクだゾ)	November 4, 2005
547	"Overcome weaknesses" (Japanese: 苦手をコクフクするゾ)	November 4, 2005
548	"Fire at the athletic meet" (Japanese: 運動会でファイヤーだゾ)	November 11, 2005
548	"Shiizo-sensei don't stop!" (Japanese: しいぞう先生やめないで！だゾ)	November 11, 2005
549	"I want to eat even with my back" (Japanese: ギックリ腰でも食べたいゾ)	November 18, 2005
549	"Goodbye fire!" (Japanese: さよならファイヤー！だゾ)	November 18, 2005
550	"Paint" (Japanese: ペンキを塗るゾ)	November 25, 2005
550	"Hima's favorite!" (Japanese: ひまのお気に入り!だゾ)	November 25, 2005
When Misae tells Hiroshi he’s getting old and worn out, Hiroshi decides to paint Shiro’s doghouse. He gets “help” from Shin-chan along the way. / Himawari gets infatuated with a handsome actor on daytime TV, but the show soon comes to an end. Sometime later, another person catches her eye.
551	"Joint party debut" (Japanese: 合コンデビューだゾ)	December 2, 2005
551	"I'll ask you to be alone" (Japanese: 頼むからひとりにしてだゾ)	December 2, 2005
When Ms. Ageo agrees to attend her very first mixer as a favor for a friend, Ms. Matsuzaka and the kids help her practice for the real event. / Hiroshi makes his family leave the house so he can concentrate on work, but he finds himself trapped in the restroom with no one around to help.
552	"Shiro is also fashionable" (Japanese: シロもおしゃれをするゾ)	December 9, 2005
552	"I want to eat yufodu" (Japanese: 湯豆腐を食べたいゾ)	December 9, 2005
When Misae mistakes an expensive brand name clothing for pets as baby clothes, Shin-chan starts talking about dressing Shiro up. / Hiroshi and Shin-chan go out in the cold to buy tofu when Misae forgets to buy some for the much-anticipated hot pot dinner that night.
SPECIAL–46	"Crayon Daichushingura (Cherry Blossoms) (1998) <again>" (Japanese: クレヨン大忠臣蔵（桜の巻）（1998年）〈再〉)	December 16, 2005
SPECIAL–46	"Crayon Daichushingura (Snow Roll) (1998) <again>" (Japanese: クレヨン大忠臣蔵（雪の巻）（1998年）〈再〉)	December 16, 2005
SPECIAL–46	"I get lost" (Japanese: 迷子になったゾ)	December 16, 2005
SPECIAL–46	"I won't lose to the rain, I won't lose to the wind" (Japanese: 雨にも負けず風にも負けないゾ)	December 16, 2005
SPECIAL–46	"Yamato of men" (Japanese: 男たちの大和だゾ)	December 16, 2005
?? / ?? / Misae tells Shin-chan to take Shiro out for a walk, but he immediately gets sidetracked by a group of female college students running past his house. / ?? / ??

== 2006 ==
No.	Title	Original release date
SPECIAL–47	"Giving back to stone statue (1998) <again>" (Japanese: 石像の恩返しだゾ（1998年）〈再〉)	January 6, 2006
SPECIAL–47	"Penguins repayment (1998) <again>" (Japanese: ペンギンの恩返しだゾ（1998年）〈再〉)	January 6, 2006
SPECIAL–47	"Match selling me (1994) <again>" (Japanese: マッチ売りのオラだゾ（1994年）〈再〉)	January 6, 2006
SPECIAL–47	"Eat pizza" (Japanese: ピザを食べるゾ)	January 6, 2006
SPECIAL–47	"Fill the time capsule" (Japanese: タイムカプセルを埋めるゾ)	January 6, 2006
?? / ?? / ?? / Misae goes out to run a quick errand. After leafing through various enticing pizza ads, Shin-chan picks up the phone to place an order by himself. / Shin-chan has a hard time deciding what to put in the time capsule he and his friends plan on opening when they are 20 years old.
553	"I ate too much" (Japanese: 食べ過ぎちゃったゾ)	January 13, 2006
553	"My Heart is Elite!" (Japanese: オラの心はエリートだゾ)	January 13, 2006
Misae decides to go on a diet again when she fails to squeeze her waist into one of her skirts. After a week of self-denial, she checks her progress. / After failing a test—and even having an accident—Kazama-kun is abandoned by his cram school friends. But the ones who come to his rescue are none other than Misae and Shinnosuke.
554	"Mom is raising a child" (Japanese: かあちゃんは子育て中だゾ)	January 20, 2006
554	"I went to a women's college again" (Japanese: また女子大に行ったゾ)	January 20, 2006
Shin-chan wants a handheld digital pet toy, but they’re sold out everywhere. Later, Hiroshi brings one home after winning it in a bingo game. / Shin-chan and his friends get treated to a tea ceremony after barging into a club room at an all-women’s college.
555	"Take me to ski" (Japanese: オラをすきーに連れてってだゾ)	January 27, 2006
556	"Playing in the snow with Shiizo-sensei" (Japanese: しいぞう先生と雪遊びだゾ)	February 3, 2006
556	"Himawari is a princess" (Japanese: ひまわりはお姫さまだゾ)	February 3, 2006
Mr. Shiizou visits the kindergarten on a snowy day and plays with the kids. Soon, the playground gets filled with various snow sculptures. / Kazama and the others come over to Shin-chan’s place while he and his sister are home alone. Together, the boys try to entertain Himawari.
557	"Go to a procession ramen shop" (Japanese: 行列のラーメン屋に行くゾ)	February 10, 2006
557	"Have Matsuzaka-sensei send it?" (Japanese: まつざか先生に送ってもらうゾ)	February 10, 2006
558	"Listen to people" (Japanese: 人の話を聞きなさいだゾ)	February 17, 2006
558	"Family ski" (Japanese: ファミリースキーだゾ)	February 17, 2006
The Noharas go out to eat at a fancy hotel. Hiroshi teaches his family how to strategically eat at a buffet, but they ignore his advice. / The Noharas go to a ski resort. Hiroshi and Shin-chan put on airs in front of pretty ladies, while Himawari goes gaga for handsome skiers.
559	"Mom is a cleaning expert" (Japanese: 母ちゃんはお掃除名人だゾ)	March 3, 2006
559	"Go buy a new car" (Japanese: 新車を買いに行くゾ)	March 3, 2006
Atsuko comes over for a visit with her daughter Atsumi. Impressed with how tidy the house is, Atsuko asks Misae to teach her how to clean. / The Noharas go shopping for a new car to replace the old one that is falling apart. They find one that they like and take it out for a test drive.
560	"Mini Pato's older sister" (Japanese: ミニパトのおねいさんだゾ)	March 10, 2006
560	"Dad's important shirt" (Japanese: 父ちゃんの大事なシャツだゾ)	March 10, 2006
Shin-chan crosses paths with a rookie police officer who shares his enthusiasm for detective dramas. / Hiroshi gets a “Babaary” brand shirt that Misae bought at an outlet. Misae becomes overly concerned about the expensive shirt getting soiled.
561	"Go to a big park" (Japanese: おっきな公園に行くゾ)	March 17, 2006
561	"My Auntie Came to Visit" (Japanese: おばちゃんが来たゾ)	March 17, 2006
?? / Shin-chan watches a crime drama at Masao’s house. On his way home, he crosses paths with a woman who looks like the killer from the show.
SPECIAL–48	"Collect candy toys and shock garn" (Japanese: 食玩集めてショックガーンだゾ)	April 14, 2006
562	"Earn Chocobi" (Japanese: チョコビをかせぐゾ)	April 21, 2006
562	"Oh No! The Family Just Got Bigger Today" (Japanese: 大変!今日から家族がふえたゾ)	April 21, 2006
Misae comes up with an idea to make Shin-chan do his chores after catching him devouring an entire box of Chocobi. / ???
563	"Sogu with the unknown" (Japanese: 未知とのそーぐーだゾ)	April 28, 2006
563	"Gutara sisters" (Japanese: グータラ姉妹だゾ)	April 28, 2006
564	"Don't lose Musae-chan!" (Japanese: 負けるな、むさえちゃん！だゾ)	May 5, 2006
564	"Kazama-kun and Shiro's walk" (Japanese: 風間くんとシロのお散歩だゾ)	May 5, 2006
565	"Preach to Musae-chan!" (Japanese: むさえちゃんにお説教！だゾ)	May 12, 2006
565	"Go out by train" (Japanese: 電車でおでかけだゾ)	May 12, 2006
566	"Formed! New Saitama Red Scorpion Corps" (Japanese: 結成！新さいたま紅さそり隊だゾ)	May 19, 2006
567	"Wash" (Japanese: お洗濯するゾ)	May 26, 2006
567	"Future Me" (Japanese: 未来のオラ達だゾ)	May 26, 2006
568	"Used for dry cleaners" (Japanese: クリーニング屋さんにお使いだゾ)	June 2, 2006
568	"Get rice" (Japanese: お米をゲットするゾ)	June 2, 2006
569	"When 3 Women Gather" (Japanese: 女３人寄っちゃったゾ)	June 9, 2006
569	"Go to the driving range" (Japanese: ゴルフ練習場に行くゾ)	June 9, 2006
570	"Excitement at the World Cup" (Japanese: ワールドカップで盛り上がるゾ)	June 16, 2006
570	"Get excited with soccer" (Japanese: サッカーで盛り上がるゾ)	June 16, 2006
Musae wakes Misae up in the middle of the night to watch a World Cup match and ends up waking the whole family. / ??
571	"Musae-chan's matchmaking" (Japanese: むさえちゃんのお見合いだゾ)	June 23, 2006
571	"Trial English conversation" (Japanese: おためし英会話だゾ)	June 23, 2006
572	"Lost friend" (Japanese: 迷子の友だゾ)	July 7, 2006
572	"Go to kindergarten with Musae-chan" (Japanese: むさえちゃんと幼稚園に行くゾ)	July 7, 2006
Shin-chan gets lost at the amusement park and meets a boy who likes ballet. Together, the two boys give one of the staff members a hard time. / Musae takes Shin-chan to his kindergarten instead of Misae. Shin-chan misdirects her from the back of her bike and makes her take the long way around.
573	"Musae-chan way of life" (Japanese: むさえちゃん流生き方だゾ)	July 14, 2006
574	"I can't keep up with strangers" (Japanese: 知らない人にはついていかないゾ)	July 21, 2006
574	"Copy Take" (Japanese: コピーをとるゾ)	July 21, 2006
Policemen visit the kindergarten to give a lecture on crime prevention for kids. Shin-chan learns what to do if an unfamiliar adult approaches him. / After spending some time trying to copy Okei's recipes by hand, Misae takes her kids to the convenience store to get the job done faster.
575	"Insect catching beautiful girl" (Japanese: 虫取り美少女だゾ)	July 28, 2006
575	"Leave the answering machine to Musae-chan" (Japanese: 留守番はむさえちゃんにおまかせだゾ)	July 28, 2006
Shin-chan and his friends go to a nearby forest to catch bugs. A self-proclaimed pretty girl that likes insects challenges the kids to a contest. / ??
576	"Muchu in Koshien" (Japanese: 甲子園にムチューだゾ)	August 4, 2006
576	"When 2 Women Gather" (Japanese: 女がふたり集まると･･･だゾ)	August 4, 2006
Shinnosuke and the others visit their principal. They start playing tag, but the principal is preoccupied with watching a baseball tournament on TV. / ??
SPECIAL–49	"I produced Yoiko" (Japanese: オラがよゐこをプロデュースだゾ)	August 11, 2006
SPECIAL–49	"Swimming in the Bath with Nanako (2003) <again>" (Japanese: なな子おねいさんと海水浴だゾ（2003年）〈再〉)	August 11, 2006
SPECIAL–49	"The air conditioner is broken" (Japanese: エアコンがこわれたゾ)	August 11, 2006
577	"Brief Panda" (Japanese: ブリーフパンダだゾ)	August 18, 2006
578	"Nagure Rabbit Frequently" (Japanese: なぐられうさぎたびたびだゾ)	August 25, 2006
578	"The weakest here" (Japanese: ここ一番に弱いゾ)	August 25, 2006
Nene gets scared and leaves her stuffed punching bunny at Shin-chan's place after having a nightmare about it. At night, it starts to move on its own. / Masao practices how to do back hip circles, but no one seems to be looking at the right time. Shin-chan and the others hide to secretly observe Masao.
579	"I'm 2 Years Old" (Japanese: オラ2歳だゾ)	September 8, 2006
579	"Musae-chan vs. Akita's grandpa" (Japanese: むさえちゃんVS秋田のじいちゃんだゾ)	September 8, 2006
Part one of the 2-year-old series. Misae and Hiroshi are newlyweds. Hungry little Shin-chan obsesses over the tamagoyaki in Hiroshi's bento box. / Ginnosuke pays an unexpected visit and plays a prank on a napping Musae, thinking she is Misae. Musae then mistakes him for an intruder.
580	"First dentist" (Japanese: 初めての歯医者さんだゾ)	September 15, 2006
580	"Gin-chan's holiday" (Japanese: 銀ちゃんの休日だゾ)	September 15, 2006
Misae takes 2-year-old Shin-chan to a toothbrushing seminar. There, they meet Kazama and the other kids who will be going to the same kindergarten. / Ginnosuke has been going out to play with Musae on a daily basis. When Misae tries to send him back to Akita, he pretends that his back hurts.
SPECIAL–50	"Kureshin Paradise! Made in Saitama" (クレしんパラダイス!メイド・イン・埼玉)	September 22, 2006
SPECIAL–50	"I'm looking forward to tomorrow's picnic (2002) <again>" (明日のピクニックは楽しみだゾ（2002年）〈再〉)	September 22, 2006
SPECIAL–51	"Looking back on this year (1996) <again>" Transliteration: "Kotoshiichinen no furikaeri dazo" (Japanese: 今年一年のふりかえりだゾ（1996年）〈再〉)	October 6, 2006
SPECIAL–51	"Battle on your mobile phone" Transliteration: "Kētai denwa de batoru dazo" (Japanese: ケータイ電話でバトルだゾ)	October 6, 2006
SPECIAL–51	"Lord of the Rings Part 1 Travel Companion"; Transliteration: "Rōdo Obu za ika ringu daiichibu tabi no nakama dazo" (Japanese: ロード・オブ・ザ・イカリング 第一部 旅の仲間だゾ)	October 6, 2006
SPECIAL–51	"Lord of the Rings Part 2 I don't know the 2 towers" Transliteration: "Rōdo Obu za ika ringu dainibu 2tsu no tō wa shiranai zo" (Japanese: ロード・オブ・ザ・イカリング 第二部 2つの塔は知らないゾ)	October 6, 2006
SPECIAL–51	"Lord of the Rings Part 3 Inpressive Complete Edition"; Transliteration: "Rōdo Obu za ika ringu daisanbu kandō no kanketsu-hen dazo" (Japanese: ロード・オブ・ザ・イカリング 第三部 感動の完結編だゾ)	October 6, 2006
?? / Misae gets into a fight with Musae. Instead of speaking to one another directly, they have a strange argument via text through Hiroshi. / ??
581	"I'm a lucky boy" (Japanese: オラ、ラッキーボーイだゾ)	October 20, 2006
581	"Potato digging showdown" (Japanese: イモ掘り対決だゾ)	October 20, 2006
Misae and Hiroshi see their energetic 2-year-old son and wish they had a bigger house. They take a look at a house ad, but the price makes them sigh. / Shin-chan and his friends compete against the Rose class on the sweet potato harvest day, but their rivals have a tuber-digging prodigy on their side.
582	"Nohara Family 3 Generations" (Japanese: 野原家三代だゾ)	October 27, 2006
582	"Call me Grandpa!" (Japanese: おじょうさまとお呼び！だゾ)	October 27, 2006
Ginnosuke, Hiroshi and Shin-chan decide to go to a public bath together while Misae is shopping and Musae is at the library. / Nene wishes she had a butler and that she lived in a mansion. She calls Shin-chan and the others over to make them audition to become her butler.
583	"The heated pool is a paradise" (Japanese: 温水プールはパラダイスだゾ)	November 3, 2006
583	"Shiro does not take medicine" (Japanese: シロがお薬をのまないゾ)	November 3, 2006
The Noharas head to a new heated swimming pool. When Shin-chan says he can only dog paddle, Hiroshi tells him he will teach him how to swim properly. / Shiro gets an immunization shot at the animal clinic. While examining him, the vet discovers a skin rash and sends him home with medicine.
584	"Red scorpion corps friendship part-time job" (Japanese: 紅サソリ隊友情のアルバイトだゾ)	November 10, 2006
584	"Buy a new suit" (Japanese: おニューのスーツを買うゾ)	November 10, 2006
Ryuko figures that Mari started working in order to pay for her mother's hospital bills. In order to help her friend, Ryuko gets a job as a waitress. / Hiroshi wants to replace his old, worn-out suit. The Noharas go shopping together, but Shin-chan makes it more of a chore than it needs to be.
585	"Autumn excursion panics" (Japanese: 秋の遠足はパニックだゾ)	November 17, 2006
The kindergarten class is on an excursion to the country, when Shin-chan and Kazama become separated from the others and get lost.
586	"It's hard to put out a kotatsu" (Japanese: コタツを出すのは大変だゾ)	November 24, 2006
586	"Let Himawari lie down" (Japanese: ひまわりを寝かせるゾ)	November 24, 2006
The Noharas decide that it is time to bring out the kotatsu, but Misae explains that it will be difficult to dig it out from the back of the closet. / Misae is dead tired because Himawari won't sleep at night. Kazama and the other kids try to put Himawari to sleep so Misae can rest.
587	"Who owns the trash!?" (Japanese: ゴミは誰のもの！？だゾ)	December 8, 2006
587	"Musae-chan's lullaby" (Japanese: むさえちゃんの子守唄だゾ)	December 8, 2006
Kazama discovers a Moe-P toy in a pile of trash. As he considers taking it home, he is spotted by Shin-chan and his other friends. / ??
SPECIAL–52	"Dad is worried" (Japanese: 父ちゃんは心配性だゾ)	December 15, 2006
SPECIAL–52	"Collect candy toys and shock garn (2006) <again>" (Japanese: 食玩集めてショックガーンだゾ（2006年）〈再〉)	December 15, 2006
Misae and Musae go to an izakaya. Hiroshi starts to worry about Misae being out too late while he stays home to watch Shin-chan and Himawari. / ??

== 2007 ==
No.	Title	Original release date
588	"Amiami together" (Japanese: みんなでアミアミだゾ)	January 12, 2007
588	"Bicycle is where?" (Japanese: 自転車はどこ?だゾ)	January 12, 2007
Shin-chan and his friends see Bo-chan finger knitting at the park. Step by step, Bo-chan tries to teach them all how to work with yarn. / Misae tries to take Shin-chan to kindergarten, but her bike is missing. Everyone looks around to see where Musae left it the night before.
589	"I'm worried" (Japanese: 心配がイッパイだゾ)	January 19, 2007
589	"Supporting working Shiro" (Japanese: 働く四郎さんを応援するゾ)	January 19, 2007
?? / The Noharas make an early morning trip to a big clothing store where they run into Yonro working at a part-time job with a strict boss.
590	"I don't like what I like" (Japanese: キライなものはキライだゾ)	January 26, 2007
590	"Replace the futon cover" (Japanese: ふとんカバーを取り替えるゾ)	January 26, 2007
It's lunchtime at Shin-chan's kindergarten and everyone's lunch has something they dislike in it. They begin to trade, but things get out of hand. / Shin-chan's mom gets him to help replace the family's futon covers, but he keeps running into trouble trying to unzip the covers.
591	"Dad's business trip" (Japanese: 父ちゃんの出張をおいかけるゾ)	February 2, 2007
592	"Forgotten walk" (Japanese: わすれられたお散歩だゾ)	February 9, 2007
592	"First time" (Japanese: 初めてのおわかれだゾ)	February 9, 2007
Shin-chan takes Shiro for a walk and runs into Masao, who invites him to the supermarket. The two head inside and leave Shiro out in the cold. / Shin-chan's mom wakes him up in excitement after seeing snow outside. He and Shiro head outside to make a snowman, but there isn't a lot of snow.
593	"Make the weather" (Japanese: あ〜した天気にするゾ)	February 16, 2007
593	"Musae-chan's Yakiniku Road" (Japanese: むさえちゃんのヤキニクロードだゾ)	February 16, 2007
Nanako promises Shin-chan that she'll take him on a picnic tomorrow if it's sunny. Meanwhile, a shoe suddenly hits Kazama's face at the park. / Musae eats a late lunch and complains that the Noharas have been eating too much hot pot. She whines when she learns they'll have yakiniku for dinner.
594	"Good hot water" (Japanese: いい湯だゾ)	February 23, 2007
594	"I got rid of Masao-kun" (Japanese: マサオくんにはえちゃったゾ)	February 23, 2007
?? / Shin-chan stops by Masao's and learns that he accidentally swallowed a mikan seed and is worried that it will sprout.
595	"I'm in style world swimming" (Japanese: オラ流世界水泳だゾ)	March 9, 2007
595	"The whole family has a fever" (Japanese: 一家そろって発熱だゾ)	March 9, 2007
596	"Mikabozu Mom" (Japanese: 三日坊主かーちゃんだゾ)	March 16, 2007
596	"I lost what I was looking for" (Japanese: さがしものをなくしたゾ)	March 16, 2007
SPECIAL–53	"I'm Nohara Shiro" (Japanese: ぼく野原シロのすけです)	April 27, 2007
When a fairy grants Shiro a wish for helping her out, he turns into a human and starts living with the Nohara family as Shin-chan’s older brother. One such day, Shin-chan goes missing at a picnic.
597	"Secretly support Masao-kun" (Japanese: マサオくんをこっそり応援するゾ)	May 11, 2007
597	"Himawari's CM audition" (Japanese: ひまわりのＣＭオーディションだゾ)	May 11, 2007
598	"Help kindergarten" (Japanese: 幼稚園をお助けするゾ)	May 18, 2007
598	"I'm in sushi restaurant" (Japanese: オラお寿司屋さんだゾ)	May 18, 2007
599	"New face in kindergarten" (Japanese: 幼稚園にニューフェイスだゾ)	May 25, 2007
New classmate Sho joins the Sunflower class, but all he does is start fights and cause trouble. He soon becomes the boss of the playground.
600	"Ai-chan and Goka play house" (Japanese: あいちゃんとゴーカなおままごとだゾ)	June 1, 2007
600	"Clean up with a hero" (Japanese: ヒーローでお片づけだゾ)	June 1, 2007
601	"The day when I became me" (Japanese: オラがオラになった日だゾ)	June 8, 2007
601	"Patrol the town" (Japanese: ご町内をパトロールするゾ)	June 8, 2007
602	"Massage gets tired" (Japanese: マッサージは疲れるゾ)	June 15, 2007
602	"Alone me" (Japanese: ひとりぽっちのオラだゾ)	June 15, 2007
603	"Nene-chan's important thing" (Japanese: ネネちゃんの一大事だゾ)	June 22, 2007
603	"It's a deceased person" (Japanese: おとしものですよぉだゾ)	June 22, 2007
604	"Enjoy Shumi" (Japanese: シュミを楽しむゾ)	July 6, 2007
604	"Present for Dad" (Japanese: 父ちゃんにプレゼントだゾ)	July 6, 2007
605	"Become an astronaut" (Japanese: 宇宙飛行士になるゾ)	July 13, 2007
605	"Speaking of summer, swimming competition" (Japanese: 夏といえば水泳大会だゾ)	July 13, 2007
606	"Paper bags are very important" (Japanese: 紙袋はすっごく大事だゾ)	July 20, 2007
606	"My peppers" (Japanese: オラんちのピーマンだゾ)	July 20, 2007
607	"Delivered deliveries" (Japanese: なくなるお届け物だゾ)	July 27, 2007
607	"Stay cool" (Japanese: 涼しくすごすゾ)	July 27, 2007
SPECIAL–54	"Shaved ice is keen" (Japanese: かき氷がキーンだゾ)	August 3, 2007
SPECIAL–54	"Catch dorcus hopei (2005) <again>" (Japanese: オオクワガタを捕るゾ（2005年）〈再〉)	August 3, 2007
SPECIAL–54	"Kamen Rider Den-O + Shin-O" (Japanese: 仮面ライダー電王VSしん王だゾ)	August 3, 2007
608	"Donut shop with a line" (Japanese: 行列のできるドーナッツ屋さんだゾ)	August 10, 2007
608	"Shiro's happiness" (Japanese: シロのしあわせだゾ)	August 10, 2007
609	"Omoi watermelon" (Japanese: おもいスイカちゃんだゾ)	August 17, 2007
609	"Don't take shelter from the rain" (Japanese: 雨宿りしませませだゾ)	August 17, 2007
610	"Me, kappa and the end of summer" (Japanese: オラとカッパと夏のおわりだゾ)	August 31, 2007
611	"Grandpa from Kyushu has arrived" (Japanese: 九州のじいちゃんが来たゾ)	September 14, 2007
612	"I tried to get motivated" (Japanese: やる気になってみたゾ)	September 21, 2007
612	"Tonight is a barbecue" (Japanese: 今夜はバーベキューだゾ)	September 21, 2007
613	"Play golf" (Japanese: ゴルフで勝負だゾ)	October 26, 2007
613	"Shooting Kessaku" (Japanese: ケッサクを撮りまくるゾ)	October 26, 2007
614	"Messed up with a massage" (Japanese: マッサージでくたくただゾ)	November 2, 2007
614	"Isoro to Isoro" (Japanese: イソーローにイソーローだゾ)	November 2, 2007
615	"Today is Sunday" (Japanese: 日曜日のオラんちだゾ)	November 16, 2007
615	"Lucky girl Nene-chan" (Japanese: ラッキーガールネネちゃんだゾ)	November 16, 2007
616	"Tissue Prince" (Japanese: ハナカミ王子だゾ)	November 30, 2007
616	"Try a part-time job" (Japanese: アルバイトしてみたゾ)	November 30, 2007
SPECIAL–55	"Nohara Shijuro" (Japanese: 野原四十郎)	December 14, 2007
SPECIAL–55	"Crayon Shin-chan: The Storm Called The Jungle (2000) (Director: Keiichi Hara)" (Japanese: クレヨンしんちゃん 嵐を呼ぶジャングル（2000年）（監督：原恵一）)	December 14, 2007
Rebroadcasting–SPECIAL	"Oh No! My Family is Just Got Bigger Today! (2006) <again>" (Japanese: 大変!今日から家族がふえたゾ（2006年）〈再）)	December 30, 2007
Rebroadcasting–SPECIAL	"Don't lose Musae-chan! (2006) <again>" (Japanese: 負けるな、むさえちゃん!だゾ（2006年）〈再〉)	December 30, 2007
Rebroadcasting–SPECIAL	"When 3 Women Gather (2006) <again>" (Japanese: 女3人寄っちゃったゾ（2006年）〈再〉)	December 30, 2007
Rebroadcasting–SPECIAL	"Grandpa from Kyushu has arrived (2007) <again>" (Japanese: 九州のじいちゃんが来たゾ（2007年）〈再〉)	December 30, 2007
Rebroadcasting–SPECIAL	"Kamen Rider Den-O + Shin-O (2007) <again>" (Japanese: 仮面ライダー電王VSしん王だゾ（2007年）〈再〉)	December 30, 2007
Rebroadcasting–SPECIAL	"I'm Nohara Shiro (2007) <again>" (Japanese: ぼく野原シロのすけです（2007年）〈再〉)	December 30, 2007

== 2008 ==
No.	Title	Original release date
617	"Return home to Akita" (Japanese: 秋田に里帰りだゾ)	January 11, 2008
618	"Celebration! Nantes!! Departure of youth" (Japanese: 祝!!ナント!青春の旅立ちだゾ)	January 18, 2008
Musae takes Shin-chan to his kindergarten class. While taking photos of the children at the playground, she meets a fellow photographer.
619	"I'll play with Dad" (Japanese: 父ちゃんと遊んであげるゾ)	January 25, 2008
619	"Welcome back Musae-chan!" (Japanese: おかえり、むさえちゃん！だゾ)	January 25, 2008
620	"Aim for World Champion" (Japanese: 目指せ世界チャンピオンだゾ)	February 1, 2008
620	"Mom revolution" (Japanese: 母ちゃん大革命だゾ)	February 1, 2008
621	"Taking Care of the House With Kazama" (Japanese: 風間くんとお留守番だゾ)	February 8, 2008
621	"Be careful of what you have left behind" (Japanese: 忘れ物に気を付けるゾ)	February 8, 2008
622	"Take a matchmaking photo" (Japanese: お見合い写真を撮るゾ)	February 15, 2008
622	"Help Masao-kun" (Japanese: マサオ君を手伝うゾ)	February 15, 2008
623	"Children's beauty salon" (Japanese: こども美容室だゾ)	February 22, 2008
623	"Eco! Go out" (Japanese: エコ！でいくゾ)	February 22, 2008
624	"Hard under the ladder" (Japanese: ハシゴの下で大変だゾ)	February 29, 2008
624	"The Refrigerator Broke" (Japanese: 冷蔵庫が壊れちゃったゾ)	February 29, 2008
625	"Nene's Illusion" (Japanese: ネネちゃんのモウソウだゾ)	March 14, 2008
625	"My Doodle is Fine Art" (Japanese: 芸術はおえかきだゾ)	March 14, 2008
SPECIAL–60	"A kindergarten child who does not call a storm" (Japanese: ちょー嵐を呼ばない園児だゾ)	April 18, 2008
626	"Sushi Prince!" (Japanese: スシ王子！だゾ)	April 25, 2008
627	"Walking" (Japanese: ウォーキングだゾ)	May 2, 2008
627	"Store pretend" (Japanese: お店屋さんごっこだゾ)	May 2, 2008
628	"I got new tea" (Japanese: 新茶をもらったゾ)	May 9, 2008
628	"I become a bodyguard" (Japanese: オラ、ボディガードになるゾ)	May 9, 2008
629	"Secret character lunch" (Japanese: ヒミツのキャラクター弁当だゾ)	May 16, 2008
629	"I decide" (Japanese: オラたちが決めるゾ)	May 16, 2008
630	"And everyone became a criminal" (Japanese: そしてみんな犯人になったゾ)	May 23, 2008
630	"Find socks!" (Japanese: 靴下を探せ!だゾ)	May 23, 2008
631	"Weak to stuffed hodai" (Japanese: 詰めホーダイに弱いゾ)	May 30, 2008
631	"Dad Left" (Japanese: 父ちゃんが出てったゾ)	May 30, 2008
632	"Nene is in Love" (Japanese: 恋するネネちゃんだゾ)	June 6, 2008
632	"I went to a yakitori shop" (Japanese: ヤキトリ屋さんに行ったゾ)	June 6, 2008
633	"It's hard to walk around Shiro!" (Japanese: シロのお散歩は大変！だゾ)	June 13, 2008
633	"Mom is late" (Japanese: 母ちゃんは遅いゾ)	June 13, 2008
634	"Red scorpion corps nursery school" (Japanese: 紅さそり隊の保育園だゾ)	June 20, 2008
634	"Cut Himawari's claws" (Japanese: ひまわりのおツメを切るゾ)	June 20, 2008
635	"Birthday party without appointment" (Japanese: アポなしでお誕生会だゾ)	July 11, 2008
635	"Gasoline barely" (Japanese: ガソリンぎりぎりだゾ)	July 11, 2008
636	"The secret love of the leader" (Japanese: 組長のヒミツの愛だゾ)	July 18, 2008
636	"The slap lottery!" (Japanese: たたたた宝くじが！だゾ)	July 18, 2008
637	"Delicious when you go on a trip" (Japanese: 旅に出るとおいしいゾ)	July 25, 2008
637	"Rainy Sunday" (Japanese: 雨の日曜日だゾ)	July 25, 2008
638	"Shikuyoro at a joint party" (Japanese: 合コンでシクヨロだゾ)	August 1, 2008
638	"Insect hunter Hiroshi" (Japanese: 昆虫ハンターひろしだゾ)	August 1, 2008
639	"See cormorant fishing" (Japanese: 鵜飼いを見るゾ)	August 8, 2008
640	"Jori Jori feels good" (Japanese: ジョリジョリが気持ちいいゾ)	August 15, 2008
640	"What a camp" (Japanese: なんちゃってキャンプだゾ)	August 15, 2008
641	"Kaminari Gorogoro" (Japanese: カミナリゴロゴロだゾ)	August 22, 2008
641	"Tan Dad" (Japanese: 日焼けの父ちゃんだゾ)	August 22, 2008
642	"I'm not really happy today" (Japanese: 今日はとことんツイてないゾ)	August 29, 2008
642	"I'm not really happy" (Japanese: わたしもとことんツイてないわだゾ)	August 29, 2008
643	"Mom left home" (Japanese: 母ちゃんが家出したゾ)	September 12, 2008
644	"What if I make up?" (Japanese: 仲直りしたら〜？だゾ)	September 19, 2008
SPECIAL–61	"Dad and point get" (Japanese: 父ちゃんとポイントゲットだゾ)	September 26, 2008
645	"Road to athletic meet" (Japanese: ロード・トゥ・運動会だゾ)	October 17, 2008
645	"I'm from the morning" (Japanese: 朝からいるゾ)	October 17, 2008
646	"I'm sick with a cold" (Japanese: お風呂でシュワっとするゾ)	October 31, 2008
646	"Separate garbage" (Japanese: ゴミを分別するゾ)	October 31, 2008
647	"Kindergarten cleanup" (Japanese: 幼稚園のおかたづけだゾ)	November 7, 2008
647	"Hima's toys" (Japanese: ひまのおもちゃだゾ)	November 7, 2008
648	"Sakurada's Sonyodai" (Japanese: 桜田のそにょだい)	November 14, 2008
648	"Wrinkled yellow handkerchief" (Japanese: しわよせの黄色いハンカチだゾ)	November 14, 2008
649	"Book usage" (Japanese: ご本のおつかいだゾ)	November 21, 2008
649	"We Are Masao's Assistants" (Japanese: マサオくんのアシスタントだゾ)	November 21, 2008
650	"Smile? Encho-sensei" (Japanese: 笑う？園長先生だゾ)	November 28, 2008
650	"Part-time job Mom" (Japanese: アルバイト母ちゃんだゾ)	November 28, 2008
651	"I'm worried about singing" (Japanese: お歌でお悩みだゾ)	December 5, 2008
651	"Mysterious Shinko-chan" (Japanese: 謎のしんこちゃんだゾ)	December 5, 2008
652	"Kazama-kun's sympathy" (Japanese: 風間くんのお見舞いだゾ)	December 12, 2008
652	"Handmade baby clothes" (Japanese: 手作りベビー服だゾ)	December 12, 2008
653	"Make money with flea market" (Japanese: フリマで稼いじゃうゾ)	December 19, 2008
653	"Dad and Shiro's Strolling" (Japanese: 父ちゃんとシロの散歩だゾ)	December 19, 2008

== 2009 ==
No.	Title	Original release date
654	"We're All in Kumamoto" (Japanese: みんなで熊本だゾ)	January 9, 2009
654	"The Trio That Gets Each Other" (Japanese: 気が合う三人だゾ)	January 9, 2009
655	"Matchmaking in Kumamoto" (Japanese: 熊本でお見合いだゾ)	January 16, 2009
655	"Nohara Family's Open Golf" (Japanese: 野原家オープンゴルフだゾ)	January 16, 2009
656	"Find anywhere" (Japanese: どこでも見つけちゃうゾ)	January 23, 2009
656	"Shinko-chan Again" (Japanese: また！しんこちゃんだゾ)	January 23, 2009
657	"The Mothers' Summit" (Japanese: ママサミットだゾ)	February 13, 2009
657	"A Little Snow" (Japanese: ちょっぴりの雪だゾ)	February 13, 2009
658	"What Master Is Looking For" (Japanese: 師匠のさがし物だゾ)	February 20, 2009
658	"Cleaning With A Rap Song" (Japanese: ラップでお掃除だゾ)	February 20, 2009
659	"Shinko-chan Once Again" (Japanese: またまたしんこちゃんだゾ)	February 27, 2009
659	"It Takes More Than A Day To Write An E-Mail" (Japanese: メールは一日にしてならずだゾ)	February 27, 2009
660	"Ai-chan Is On A Diet" (Japanese: あいちゃんがダイエットだゾ)	March 13, 2009
660	"We Go On A Trip" (Japanese: オラ、旅立つゾ)	March 13, 2009
661	"A wandering husler" (Japanese: さすらいのハスラーだゾ)	April 3, 2009
661	"Shinko-chan's Last Appearance" (Japanese: さいごの？しんこちゃんだゾ)	April 3, 2009
SPECIAL–62	"I'm a Lion and King 1" (Japanese: オラはライオンでキングだゾ 1)	April 24, 2009
SPECIAL–62	"Art is Oekaki" (Japanese: 芸術はおえかきだゾ)	April 24, 2009
SPECIAL–62	"I'm a Lion and King 2" (Japanese: オラはライオンでキングだゾ 2)	April 24, 2009
SPECIAL–62	"Eco! Go out" (Japanese: エコ！でいくゾ)	April 24, 2009
662	"Planting Radishes" (Japanese: オラのラディッシュちゃんだゾ)	May 1, 2009
662	"Hide and hide" (Japanese: かくれてかくすゾ)	May 1, 2009
663	"Nanako Sister and Answering Machine" (Japanese: ななこおねいさんとお留守番だゾ)	May 8, 2009
663	"Making a Shelf With Dad" (Japanese: 父ちゃんと棚を作るゾ)	May 8, 2009
664	"Ai-chan Runs Away From Home" (Japanese: あいちゃんの家出だゾ)	May 15, 2009
664	"Finding A Lost Child!" (Japanese: 迷子を捕まえろ！だゾ)	May 15, 2009
665	"Shiro's perch" (Japanese: シロのおとまりだゾ)	May 22, 2009
665	"It's a good place" (Japanese: いいところなのに･･･だゾ)	May 22, 2009
666	"Connect clay" (Japanese: 粘土をコネコネするゾ)	May 29, 2009
666	"It's A Secret!" (Japanese: それはヒミツ！だゾ)	May 29, 2009
667	"Matsuzaka-sensei is addicted" (Japanese: まつざか先生がハマッたゾ)	June 5, 2009
667	"Leave Himawari in Child Care" (Japanese: ひまわりをあずけるゾ)	June 5, 2009
668	"Norinori at the wedding" (Japanese: 結婚式でノリノリだゾ)	June 12, 2009
668	"Driving In The Middle Of The Night" (Japanese: 真夜中のドライブだゾ)	June 12, 2009
669	"Love Letter Strategy" (Japanese: ラブレター大作戦だゾ)	June 19, 2009
669	"Replace the rubber" (Japanese: ゴムをとりかえるゾ)	June 19, 2009
670	"Thumbs, Hello" (Japanese: 親指さん、こんにちはだゾ)	July 3, 2009
670	"Crayfish Great Escape" (Japanese: ザリガニ大脱走だゾ)	July 3, 2009
671	"The criminal is slack!" (Japanese: 犯人はダレだ！だゾ)	July 10, 2009
671	"Gallery Nohara" (Japanese: ぎゃるり野原だゾ)	July 10, 2009
672	"Bento Boys" (Japanese: 弁当男子だゾ)	July 17, 2009
672	"Hima's Pool Diary" (Japanese: ひまのプール日記だゾ)	July 17, 2009
673	"Clean up with an answering machine" (Japanese: お留守番でおそうじだゾ)	July 24, 2009
673	"Weekly Saitama Prefectural Office" (Japanese: 週刊埼玉県庁だゾ)	July 24, 2009
674	"Dr. Kazama" (Japanese: Dr.カザマだゾ)	July 31, 2009
674	"Be quiet at the bank" (Japanese: 銀行ではお静かにだゾ)	July 31, 2009
675	"Departure of Mom and Daughter" (Japanese: 屈底母娘の家出だソ)	August 7, 2009
675	"Stone conveys feelings" (Japanese: 石が気持ちを伝えるゾ)	August 7, 2009
676	"Giving back the vine" (Japanese: ツルの恩返しだゾ)	August 14, 2009
676	"Find the legendary war fan 1" (Japanese: 伝説の軍扇をさがせだゾ１)	August 14, 2009
677	"Shiro's summer heat" (Japanese: シロが夏バテだゾ)	August 21, 2009
677	"Find the legendary war fan 2" (Japanese: 伝説の軍扇をさがせだゾ２)	August 21, 2009
678	"Horizontal bar at night" (Japanese: 夜の鉄棒だゾ)	August 28, 2009
678	"Take the world" (Japanese: 天下を取るゾ)	August 28, 2009
679	"Memory of Love during the Sengoku Period" (Japanese: 恋の戦国メモリーだゾ)	September 4, 2009
679	"Sengoku is Here" (Japanese: 戦国しちゃうゾ)	September 4, 2009
680	"Nene-chan's opponent is hard" (Japanese: ネネちゃんの相手は大変だゾ)	September 18, 2009
680	"I lost the key" (Japanese: 鍵をなくしたゾ)	September 18, 2009
681	"Concut" (Japanese: コンカツだゾ)	October 16, 2009
681	"Aim for a home run" (Japanese: ホームランを狙うゾ)	October 16, 2009
682	"Four-leaf clover" (Japanese: 四葉のクローバーだゾ)	October 23, 2009
682	"I got potatoes" (Japanese: おイモをもらったゾ)	October 23, 2009
683	"Mom vs. Himawari" (Japanese: 母ちゃんＶＳひまわりだゾ)	October 30, 2009
683	"Shinko-chan often" (Japanese: しんこちゃんたびたびだゾ)	October 30, 2009
683	"Hima will do it" (Japanese: ひまがやっちゃうゾ)	October 30, 2009
684	"I'm not good at Su Su" (Japanese: スースーが苦手だゾ)	November 6, 2009
684	"Calligraphy is fun" (Japanese: 書道は楽しいゾ)	November 6, 2009
685	"The mobile zoo has come" (Japanese: 移動動物園が来たゾ)	November 13, 2009
685	"I care about how to hold chopsticks" (Japanese: 箸の持ち方を気にするゾ)	November 13, 2009
686	"Letter to Nene-chan" (Japanese: ネネちゃんにお手紙だゾ)	November 20, 2009
686	"Get along" (Japanese: 仲良くして！だゾ)	November 20, 2009
687	"Appear on the one-on-one calendar" (Japanese: ワンワンカレンダーに出るゾ)	November 27, 2009
687	"Power up with false eyelashes" (Japanese: つけまつげでパワーアップだゾ)	November 27, 2009
688	"Ageo-sensei's secret weekend" (Japanese: 上尾先生の秘密の週末だゾ)	December 4, 2009
688	"Bazzar in kindergarten" (Japanese: 幼稚園でバザーだゾ)	December 4, 2009
SPECIAL–63	"Crayon Shin-chan: The Storm Called: The Adult Empire Strikes Back (2001) (Director: Keiichi Hara)" (Japanese: クレヨンしんちゃん 嵐を呼ぶ モーレツ!オトナ帝国の逆襲（2001年）（監督：原恵一）)	December 18, 2009
SPECIAL–63	"Snow Prince" (Japanese: スノープリンスだゾ)	December 18, 2009

== 2010 ==
No.	Title	Original release date
689	"Encho-sensei's Misfortune" (Japanese: 園長先生の災難だゾ)	January 8, 2010
689	"I Got a High-class Chocolate!" (Japanese: 高級チョコをもらったゾ)	January 8, 2010
689	"What About the Future!?" (Japanese: 将来は！？だゾ)	January 8, 2010
690	"Shinko-chan Again!" (Japanese: しんこちゃんまたまた！だゾ)	January 15, 2010
690	"Clean Up the Cardboard Box" (Japanese: 段ボール箱を片づけるゾ)	January 15, 2010
690	"What About the Future!? 2" (Japanese: 将来は！？だゾ2)	January 15, 2010
691	"Chocobi's Factory Tour" (Japanese: チョコビの工場見学だゾ)	January 22, 2010
691	"Action Mask Towel" (Japanese: アクション仮面タオルだゾ)	January 22, 2010
691	"What About the Future!? 3" (Japanese: 将来は！？だゾ3)	January 22, 2010
692	"The Trip to Perth is Memorable" (Japanese: 思い出のパース旅行だゾ)	January 29, 2010
692	"What About the Future!? 4" (Japanese: 将来は！？だゾ4)	January 29, 2010
693	"Kasukabe Large Set" (Japanese: カスカベ大集合だゾ)	February 5, 2010
693	"I Saw the Housekeeping Agency!" (Japanese: 家事代行屋さんは見た！だゾ)	February 5, 2010
694	"Under the Coat..." (Japanese: コートの下は…だゾ)	February 19, 2010
694	"Ask a Shooting Star" (Japanese: 流れ星にお願いするゾ)	February 19, 2010
695	"The Drive that Came Out" (Japanese: 出たとこドライブだゾ)	March 12, 2010
695	"I Want to Eat Yakiimo Anymore" (Japanese: どーしてもヤキイモが食べたいゾ)	March 12, 2010
696	"Kasukabe Time Patrol Corps I Want to See My Bride" (Japanese: 春我部タイムパトロール隊 オラの花嫁がみたいゾ)	March 26, 2010
SPECIAL–64	"Kasukabe Time Patrol Corps The Secret of the Birth of Me" (Japanese: カスカベタイムパトロール隊 オラ誕生のヒミツだゾ)	April 16, 2010
SPECIAL–64	"First Dentist (2006) <again>" (Japanese: 初めての歯医者さんだゾ（2006年）〈再〉)	April 16, 2010
SPECIAL–64	"Future Us (2006) <again>" (Japanese: 未来のオラ達だゾ（2006年）〈再〉)	April 16, 2010
697	"Apply for the Sweepstakes" (Japanese: 懸賞に応募するゾ)	April 23, 2010
697	"Matsuzaka-sensei, Finally" (Japanese: まつざか先生、ついにだゾ)	April 23, 2010
698	"Shiro is Going" (Japanese: シロがゆくえふめいだゾ)	April 30, 2010
698	"Returned Office Worker Shinnosuke" (Japanese: 帰ってきたサラリーマンしんのすけだゾ)	April 30, 2010
699	"Dream Autograph Signing" (Japanese: 夢のサイン会だゾ)	May 7, 2010
699	"Bo-chan and Himawari" (Japanese: ボーちゃんとひまわりだゾ)	May 7, 2010
700	"Far Away from Sugoroku" (Japanese: すごろくは遠いゾ)	May 14, 2010
700	"Dad is Working Out" (Japanese: フィットネス父ちゃんだゾ)	May 14, 2010
701	"Decorating the Stroller" (Japanese: ベビーカーをデコるゾ)	May 21, 2010
701	"Escorting Nene-chan" (Japanese: ネネちゃんをエスコートだゾ)	May 21, 2010
701	"Decorating" (Japanese: デコるゾ)	May 21, 2010
702	"My Answering Machine is Pounding, I'm a Little Scared" (Japanese: お留守番がドキドキだゾ ちょっと怖いぞ編)	May 28, 2010
702	"Go to Hima’s Event" (Japanese: ひまのイベントに行くゾ)	May 28, 2010
703	"Kazama-kun's Hair Is...!" (Japanese: 風間くんの髪が...だゾ)	June 4, 2010
703	"Family Restaurant is the Best" (Japanese: ファミレスは最高だゾ)	June 4, 2010
703	"Without Knowing..." (Japanese: 知らないうちに...だゾ)	June 4, 2010
704	"Rock Soul" (Japanese: ロック魂だゾ)	June 11, 2010
704	"Soccer Taro's Demon Extermination" (Japanese: サッカー太郎の鬼退治だゾ)	June 11, 2010
705	"Noisy Pedometer" (Japanese: うるさい歩数計だゾ)	July 2, 2010
705	"Too Big" (Japanese: でかすぎるゾ)	July 2, 2010
706	"Shiro-san in Love" (Japanese: 恋する四郎さんだゾ)	July 9, 2010
706	"Protect the Carpet" (Japanese: カーペットを守るゾ)	July 9, 2010
707	"Get a Sticker" (Japanese: シールをもらうゾ)	July 16, 2010
707	"Hima and Answering Machine Are Throbbing" (Japanese: ひまとお留守番はドキドキだゾ)	July 16, 2010
708	"Goodbye Micchi and Yoshirin" (Japanese: さよならミッチーヨシリンだゾ)	July 30, 2010
709	"The Octopi Are Many" (Japanese: タコさんはたくさんだゾ)	August 6, 2010
709	"Goldfish Scooping Showdown" (Japanese: 金魚すくいで勝負だゾ)	August 6, 2010
710	"What Bo-chan Wants" (Japanese: ボーちゃんのほしいものだゾ)	August 13, 2010
710	"Water" (Japanese: 水まきするゾ)	August 13, 2010
711	"5,000 Yen Juice" (Japanese: 五千円のジュースだゾ)	August 20, 2010
711	"Chocobi World" (Japanese: チョコビワールドだゾ)	August 20, 2010
712	"Chabudai Demon" (Japanese: ちゃぶ台鬼だゾ)	August 27, 2010
712	"Shiro's Day" (Japanese: シロの一日だゾ)	August 27, 2010
713	"Walk on the Line" (Japanese: 線の上を歩くゾ)	September 10, 2010
713	"First Coin Laundry" (Japanese: 初コインランドリーだゾ)	September 10, 2010
714	"Lunchbox at Home" (Japanese: おウチでお弁当だゾ)	September 17, 2010
714	"Dad's Secret Night" (Japanese: 父ちゃんの秘密の夜だゾ)	September 17, 2010
715	"Team Leader Imechen Strategy" (Japanese: 組長イメチェン大作戦だゾ)	October 15, 2010
715	"Akita's Grandpa is Back" (Japanese: 秋田のじいちゃんがまた来たゾ)	October 15, 2010
716	"Yuutsu of the Clothes I Got" (Japanese: もらった服のゆううつだゾ)	October 22, 2010
716	"Luxury Cake Shop" (Japanese: 高級ケーキ屋さんだゾ)	October 22, 2010
717	"Products with Reasons" (Japanese: ワケあり商品だゾ)	October 29, 2010
717	"Dad's Babysitter" (Japanese: 父ちゃんの子守りだゾ)	October 29, 2010
718	"Villains Are Cool" (Japanese: 悪役はカッコいいゾ)	November 12, 2010
718	"Go Mushroom Hunting" (Japanese: キノコ狩りへ行くゾ)	November 12, 2010
719	"Buying Children" (Japanese: 子ども買いだゾ)	November 19, 2010
719	"Chasing Nanako Sister" (Japanese: ななこおねいさんを追いかけるゾ)	November 19, 2010
SPECIAL–65	"Running an Errand [Re-1992/4/13]" (Japanese: おつかいに行くゾ[再1992/4/13])	November 26, 2010
SPECIAL–65	"Shin-men Hero is Here!" (Japanese: SHIN-MEN ヒーロー登場！)	November 26, 2010
SPECIAL–65	"Shin-men Hero is Here! (2)" (Japanese: SHIN-MEN ヒーロー登場！(2))	November 26, 2010
SPECIAL–65	"It's Hard to Put a Compress" (Japanese: 湿布を貼るのは大変だゾ)	November 26, 2010
SPECIAL–65	"Crayon Shin-chan 20th Anniversary Ayumi Shin Walk" (Japanese: クレヨンしんちゃん20周年のあゆみ しん散歩)	November 26, 2010
720	"Lunchbox Battle" (Japanese: お弁当箱の戦いだゾ)	December 3, 2010
720	"Rabbit Came Home" (Japanese: ウサギが家にやってきたゾ)	December 3, 2010
721	"Go to the Multiplex" (Japanese: シネコンに行くゾ)	December 10, 2010
721	"Ranking without Permission" (Japanese: 勝手にランキングだゾ)	December 10, 2010

== 2011 ==
No.	Title	Original release date
722	"Dead Leaves" (Japanese: 枯れ葉よ〜、だゾ)	January 14, 2011
722	"Trial Ai-chan" (Japanese: 試練のあいちゃんだゾ)	January 14, 2011
723	"Teacher's Help" (Japanese: 先生のお手伝いだゾ)	January 21, 2011
723	"Full of Remote Control" (Japanese: リモコンがいっぱいだゾ)	January 21, 2011
723	"What's a Spy?" (Japanese: スパイって何?だゾ)	January 21, 2011
724	"Moe-P's Birthday" (Japanese: もえＰの誕生日だゾ)	January 28, 2011
724	"Shin-men 3 Can's Secret" (Japanese: ＳＨＩＮ−ＭＥＮ３ カンのヒミツ)	January 28, 2011
725	"With Mochi" (Japanese: おモチつきだゾ)	February 4, 2011
725	"Give a Name" (Japanese: 名前をつけるゾ)	February 4, 2011
726	"The Secret Room is Paradise" (Japanese: 秘密の部屋はパラダイスだゾ)	February 18, 2011
726	"A Clean Room is Difficult" (Japanese: きれいな部屋は苦しいゾ)	February 18, 2011
727	"Shiro and Messenger" (Japanese: シロとおつかいだゾ)	February 25, 2011
727	"Shin-men 4 Hugh's Love" (Japanese: ＳＨＩＮ−ＭＥＮ4 ヒューの恋)	February 25, 2011
728	"Spy the Roses" (Japanese: ばら組をスパイするゾ)	March 25, 2011
728	"Bicycle Commuting" (Japanese: 自転車通勤するゾ)	March 25, 2011
SPECIAL–66	"Spy Clan Nohara" (Japanese: スパイ一族ノハーラだゾ)	April 8, 2011
SPECIAL–66	"Super Spy Misae" (Japanese: スーパースパイミサエだゾ)	April 8, 2011
SPECIAL–66	"Crayon Shin-chan: Super-Dimension! The Storm Called My Bride" (Japanese: 映画『超時空！ 嵐を呼ぶオラの花嫁』)	April 8, 2011
SPECIAL–67	"Agent Dad" (Japanese: エージェント父ちゃんだゾ)	April 22, 2011
SPECIAL–67	"Kamen Rider Den-O vs. Shin-O" (Japanese: 仮面ライダー電王VSしん王だゾ)	April 22, 2011
SPECIAL–67	"Help the Aunt Next Door" (Japanese: 隣のおばさんをお助けするゾ)	April 22, 2011
729	"I Want Brothers" (Japanese: きょうだいが欲しいゾ)	April 29, 2011
729	"Mom's Diary" (Japanese: 母ちゃんの日記だゾ)	April 29, 2011
730	"Kazama's Dad is Coming Back" (Japanese: 風間くんのパパが帰ってくるゾ)	May 6, 2011
730	"Our Imagination Flies" (Japanese: 妄想するゾ)	May 6, 2011
731	"Sukeman Mom" (Japanese: スケバンママだゾ)	May 13, 2011
731	"Read Aloud" (Japanese: 読み聞かせだゾ)	May 13, 2011
732	"Flower-filled Strategy" (Japanese: 花いっぱい大作戦だゾ)	May 20, 2011
732	"Make a Business Card" (Japanese: 名刺を作るゾ)	May 20, 2011
733	"Catch Big Fish" (Japanese: 大物を釣るゾ)	May 27, 2011
733	"Shin-men" (Japanese: SHIN-MEN)	May 27, 2011
734	"Teach How to Keep a Dog" (Japanese: 犬の飼い方教えるゾ)	June 3, 2011
734	"I Got the Money" (Japanese: お金をひろったゾ)	June 3, 2011
735	"Pirates of Aribian" (Japanese: パイレーツオブアリビアンだゾ)	June 10, 2011
735	"Hip-Hop Dancing" (Japanese: ヒップホップダンスだゾ)	June 10, 2011
735	"Small Me" (Japanese: 小さいオラだゾ)	June 10, 2011
736	"I Envy Shiro" (Japanese: シロがうらやましいゾ)	June 17, 2011
736	"Teachers' Shopping" (Japanese: 先生たちのお買い物だゾ)	June 17, 2011
737	"Became a Terretrial Digital" (Japanese: 地デジになったゾ)	June 24, 2011
737	"Futu's Schoolgirl Time" (Japanese: フツーの女子高生タイムだゾ)	June 24, 2011
738	"Red Zukin and Purple Zukin" (Japanese: 赤ズキンと紫ズキンだゾ)	July 1, 2011
738	"Shin-men" (Japanese: SHIN-MEN)	July 1, 2011
739	"Mysterious Ring" (Japanese: ふしぎな指輪だゾ)	July 8, 2011
739	"Dad Works at Home" (Japanese: ウチではたらく父ちゃんだゾ)	July 8, 2011
740	"Prince's Shoes" (Japanese: 王子様のクツだゾ)	July 15, 2011
740	"Lunch by Car" (Japanese: 車でランチだゾ)	July 15, 2011
741	"Kazama-kun's Summer Vacation" (Japanese: 風間くんの夏休みだゾ)	July 22, 2011
741	"Hammer to the Stroller" (Japanese: ベビーカーにハマッたゾ)	July 22, 2011
742	"General Kid Musae" (Japanese: ガキ大将むさえだゾ)	August 5, 2011
742	"Perch in the Countryside" (Japanese: 田舎にとまるゾ)	August 5, 2011
743	"Nene-chan's Sticker" (Japanese: ネネちゃんのシールだゾ)	August 12, 2011
743	"Find Treasure" (Japanese: お宝を探すゾ)	August 12, 2011
744	"Kasukabe Ninja Corps Heavenly / Earth" (Japanese: カスカベ忍者隊だゾ 天の巻・地の巻)	August 19, 2011
745	"Scary DVD" (Japanese: こわ～いDVDだゾ)	August 26, 2011
746	"Let's Play with My Old Clothes" (Japanese: 古着で遊んじゃうゾ)	September 2, 2011
746	"Dad's Lunch is Hard" (Japanese: 父ちゃんのランチは大変だゾ)	September 2, 2011
747	"I'm a Professional Baseball Player" (Japanese: オラはプロ野球選手だゾ)	October 21, 2011
747	"A Close-up of Himawari" (Japanese: ひまわりを激写だゾ)	October 21, 2011
748	"Forensic Shin-chan" (Japanese: 鑑識しんちゃんだゾ)	October 28, 2011
749	"Taiyaki Shop" (Japanese: たいやき屋さんだゾ)	November 4, 2011
749	"I Dropped My Wallet" (Japanese: 財布を落としたゾ)	November 4, 2011
750	"When My Car Barks!!" (Japanese: オラの車が吠える時！！だゾ)	November 11, 2011
750	"Shin-men "Reverse Gonyo Gonyo Strategy! Part 1"" (Japanese: SHIN-MEN『リバースごにょごにょ大作戦！前編』)	November 11, 2011
751	"What's Inside the Box?" (Japanese: 箱の中身は何でしょねだゾ)	November 18, 2011
751	"Shin-men "Reverse Gonyo Gonyo Strategy! Part 2"" (Japanese: SHIN-MEN『リバースごにょごにょ大作戦！後編』)	November 18, 2011
752	"Free Ai-chan" (Japanese: 自由なあいちゃんだゾ)	November 25, 2011
752	"Save the Galaxy's Crisis" (Japanese: 銀河の危機をお救いするゾ)	November 25, 2011
753	"Chikuwa and Bean Sprouts" (Japanese: ちくわともやしだゾ)	December 2, 2011
753	"Discerning Coffee Shop" (Japanese: こだわりのコーヒーショップだゾ)	December 2, 2011
754	"Let Ai-chan Experience for the First Time" (Japanese: あいちゃんに初体験させるゾ)	December 9, 2011
754	"Ageo-sensei, Something Strange" (Japanese: 上尾先生、なんかヘンだゾ)	December 9, 2011
Shin-chan's rich classmate Ai shows up to his house unannounced in a limousine and treats his aunt like her servant. / ??
755	"Large Cleaning at the Entrance" (Japanese: 玄関の大そうじだゾ)	December 16, 2011
755	"Shin-men "Disappointed with Curry-great Strategy!"" (Japanese: SHIN-MEN 『カレーでガッカリ～大作戦！』)	December 16, 2011
