= Kamen Rider Den-O + Shin-O =

Episode of Crayon Shin-chan

Kamen Rider Den-O + Shin-O (仮面ライダー電王+しん王, Kamen Raidā Den'ō Ando Shin'ō) is the title of a special episode of Crayon Shin-chan initially played as part of a full hour special titled "Crayon Shin-chan Midsummer Night: Here I Come! The Storm is Called Den-O vs. Shin-O 60 Minute Special!!" (クレヨンしんちゃん 真夏の夜にオラ参上！ 嵐を呼ぶ電王VSしん王 60分スペシャル！！, Kureyon Shinchan Manatsu no Yoru ni Ora Sanjō! Arashi o Yobu Den'ō Bui Esu Shin'ō Rokujuppun Supesharu!!) that aired on August 3, 2007. It featured a crossover between Shin-chan and the tokusatsu series Kamen Rider Den-O, as well as three regular summer-themed episodes. The Den-O characters are drawn in the style of Shin-chan's regular characters.

To tie in with the special episode, Bandai produced figures of Den-O, Momotaros, Shin-O, and Buriburizaemon as they appeared in the episode.

== Story ==
When Misae is trying to get Shin-chan ready for the bus on time, he suddenly has to go to the toilet. As Misae pleads to him to hold it in until he gets to school, Shin-chan manages to get inside, but instead of the toilet he finds himself on the DenLiner and on Ryotaro's face. He quickly becomes smitten with Hana and Naomi, much to their chagrin, while everyone tries to figure out why Shin-chan has managed to get on the DenLiner. Back in the Nohara house, Misae bangs on the door as the Fatmass Imagin tries to grant Misae's wish, which is to get Shin-chan to the bus on time.

Back on the DenLiner, Hana realizes that it must be due to an Imagin, which Shin-chan mispronounces as "Himajin" (ヒマジン; "Bored Person"), including calling Momotaros a red Buriburizaemon, who Momotaros identifies (and summons) as the legendary Imagin. When Ryotaro transforms into Kamen Rider Den-O Sword Form so they can defeat the evil Imagin that has appeared, Shin-chan jumps up and manages to transform with him into Kamen Rider Shin-O. When the door opens on Misae, she is insulted by Momotaros just as the Fatmass Imagin attacks the group. Den-O takes a beating until Shin-O glues the Fatmass Imagin's three fat masses together, leading the Imagin to want to go back in time to erase any day Shin-chan was on time, only to find none exist.

Den-O destroys the Fatmass Imagin, saving Shin-chan and Misae who leave just in time to find that the bus has left without them. The Owner, impressed by how Shin-chan has helped them protect the flow of time, allows Misae and Shin-chan to go back in time to just before the bus arrived. Bidding farewell to their new friends, Shin-chan realizes he still has to use the toilet, but while fighting with Misae to get to the toilet, soils himself just as the bus rolls up.

== Characters ==
- Shinnosuke Nohara/Kamen Rider Shin-O (野原しんのすけ/仮面ライダーしん王, Nohara Shin'nosuke/Kamen Raidā Shin'ō): Shinnosuke is a kindergarten-aged boy whose antics and grasp of the Japanese language are the basis for his series. While going to the bathroom one morning before school, Shin-chan is accidentally transported aboard the Den-Liner. While there, he causes mischief for the crew and passengers. He becomes Kamen Rider Shin-O to help Den-O fight an Imagin that has contracted itself with his mother.
- Misae Nohara (野原みさえ, Nohara Misae): Misae is Shin-chan's mother, a homemaker of 29 who does not have a lot of patience for her son when he starts misbehaving. Her intent for Shin-chan to get to school on time leads to her contract with the evil Fatass Imagin, endangering herself and the DenLiner crew.
- Ryotaro Nogami/Kamen Rider Den-O (野上 良太郎/仮面ライダー電王, Nogami Ryōtarō/Kamen Raidā Den'ō): Ryotaro Nogami is a very unlucky young man who discovers the Rider Pass which allows him to become Kamen Rider Den-O to fight the Imagin and protect the flow of time. He is contracted to the Imagin Momotaros.
- Hana (ハナ): Hana is a young woman whose very timeline was erased and is only unaffected because she is a Singularity Point. She helps Ryotaro protect the flow of time.
- Naomi (ナオミ): Naomi is the DenLiner's waitress. She has a childlike personality and is not surprised easily.
- Owner (オーナー, Ōnā): The Owner of the DenLiner is a strange old man who speaks in riddles when it comes to the nature of the flow of time.
- Momotaros (モモタロス, Momotarosu): Momotaros is the hot-headed Imagin who would rather fight other Imagin than grant a wish to change the flow of time. He is the first Imagin that possesses Ryotaro, aiding him in battle by allowing Den-O to become Sword Form. He is also the subject of most abuse from Hana. Momotaros plays a part in summoning Buriburizaemon into the present by removing his shoulder pads and clapping them together like two coconuts.

New characters

- Fatmass Imagin (三段腹イマジン, Sandanbara Imajin): An Imagin that forms a contract with Misae while she's trying to get Shin-chan out of the bathroom so she can get him to the bus on time.
- The Legendary Imagin (伝説のイマジン, Densetsu no Imajin): This Imagin is depicted as Buriburizaemon (ぶりぶりざえもん), an anthropomorphic pig who appears in Shin-chan when ancient Japan is discussed, a quite cowardly/lazy/treacherous/funny sort who talks like a hero. He disappears when trying to speak.

== Cast ==
- Shinnosuke Nohara (野原 しんのすけ, Nohara Shin'nosuke): Akiko Yajima (矢島 晶子, Yajima Akiko)
- Misae Nohara (野原 みさえ, Nohara Misae), Fatass Imagin (三段腹イマジン, Sandanbara Imajin): Miki Narahashi (ならはし みき, Narahashi Miki)
- Ryotaro Nogami (野上 良太郎, Nogami Ryōtarō): Takeru Satoh (佐藤 健, Satō Takeru)
- Hana (ハナ): Yuriko Shiratori (白鳥 百合子, Shiratori Yuriko)
- Naomi (ナオミ): Rina Akiyama (秋山 莉奈, Akiyama Rina)
- Owner (オーナー, Ōnā): Kenjirō Ishimaru (石丸 謙二郎, Ishimaru Kenjirō)
- Momotaros (モモタロス, Momotarosu): Toshihiko Seki (関 俊彦, Seki Toshihiko)
