= List of Crayon Shin-chan episodes (2012–2021) =

This is a list of Crayon Shin-chan episodes from 2012 to 2021.

== 2012 ==
No.	Title	Original release date
756	"It's the New Year!" (Japanese: 今年こそは！だゾ)	January 6, 2012
756	"Daddy's Souvenir Battle" (Japanese: 父ちゃんのお土産大作戦だゾ)	January 6, 2012
756	"The Haunted Piggy Bank" (Japanese: ツケつもり貯金だゾ)	January 6, 2012
757	"Nohara Family's Home Escape Strategy" (Japanese: 野原家脱出大作戦だゾ)	January 13, 2012
757	"Flowers for Masao-kun..." (Japanese: マサオくんに花を...だゾ)	January 13, 2012
757	"Hima the Guy" (Japanese: ひまのヤツだゾ)	January 13, 2012
758	"Party of One" (Japanese: おひとりさまだゾ)	January 20, 2012
759	"Going to Cairo" (Japanese: カイロであったカイロだゾ)	January 27, 2012
759	"Daddy's Sunday" (Japanese: 父ちゃんの日曜日だゾ)	January 27, 2012
760	"Bo-chan and the Goldfish" (Japanese: 金魚とボーちゃんだゾ)	February 3, 2012
760	"Pants Pinch" (Japanese: ズボンがピンチだゾ)	February 3, 2012
761	"Matsuzaka-sensei Does Shopping" (Japanese: まつざか先生のお買い物だゾ)	February 10, 2012
761	"Together with Bo-chan" (Japanese: ボーちゃんといっしょだゾ)	February 10, 2012
762	"Cooking Rice" (Japanese: ごはんをたくゾ)	February 17, 2012
762	"Large Profit 20th Anniversary Movie" (Japanese: 映画20周年記念大喜利)	February 17, 2012
763	"Mommy's Sprained" (Japanese: 母ちゃんが捻挫したゾ)	February 24, 2012
763	"Himawari is a Babysitter?" (Japanese: ひまわりはベビーシッター？だゾ)	February 24, 2012
764	"Prince Shiro" (Japanese: シロ王子だゾ)	March 9, 2012
764	"Nohara Family in Space (Part one)" (Japanese: 宇宙家族ノハラだゾ（前編）)	March 9, 2012
SPECIAL–68	"After all siblings" (Japanese: やっぱりきょうだいだゾ)	March 16, 2012
SPECIAL–68	"Nohara Family in Space (Part two)" (Japanese: 宇宙家族ノハラだゾ（後編）)	March 16, 2012
SPECIAL–68	"The baby’s name has been decided (1996) <again>" (Japanese: 赤ちゃんの名前が決まったゾ（1996年）〈再〉)	March 16, 2012
765	"Can Carry Wars" (Japanese: 缶ケリウォーズだゾ)	March 23, 2012
765	"Sleepover at Nene-chan's" (Japanese: ネネちゃんちでお泊まり会だゾ)	March 23, 2012
766	"Lost at the Cherry Blossom Viewing" (Japanese: お花見で迷子だゾ)	March 30, 2012
766	"SHIN-MEN Nursing Strategy!" (Japanese: SHIN-MEN 育児でバブッと大作戦！)	March 30, 2012
SPECIAL–69	"Crayon Shin-chan: The Storm Called: Operation Golden Spy (2011) (Director: Souichi Masui)" (Japanese: クレヨンしんちゃん 嵐を呼ぶ黄金のスパイ大作戦（2011年）（監督：増井壮一）)	April 13, 2012
767	"Two-thousand Yen Lottery" (Japanese: 二千円で福引きだゾ)	April 27, 2012
767	"Aim For the Shutter Chance" (Japanese: シャッターチャンスを狙うゾ)	April 27, 2012
768	"Mommy's BNP" (Japanese: 母ちゃんはBNPだゾ)	May 4, 2012
769	"The Path to the Gold Metal" (Japanese: 金メダルへの道だゾ)	May 11, 2012
769	"Cooking Classes for Children and Papa" (Japanese: パパとこどものお料理教室だゾ)	May 11, 2012
770	"Ikuji Showdown" (Japanese: イクじい対決だゾ)	May 18, 2012
770	"Which is Going Home First" (Japanese: どっちが先に帰るかだゾ)	May 18, 2012
770	"Solar Eclipse" (Japanese: 金環日食だゾ)	May 18, 2012
771	"Masked Daddy" (Japanese: 覆面父ちゃんだゾ)	May 25, 2012
771	"Me, Sleeping by Myself" (Japanese: オラ、ひとりで寝るゾ)	May 25, 2012
772	"Search for Shiro" (Japanese: シロを探すゾ)	June 1, 2012
772	"Protect the Poster" (Japanese: ポスターを守るゾ)	June 1, 2012
773	"Not Betraying Action Mask" (Japanese: アクション仮面を裏切らないゾ)	June 15, 2012
773	"Worried Kazuma-kun" (Japanese: 気になってる風間くんだゾ)	June 15, 2012
773	"Hating Being Damp" (Japanese: ジメジメはいやだゾ)	June 15, 2012
774	"Special Training for Shiro" (Japanese: シロを特訓だゾ)	June 22, 2012
774	"Love Aquarium" (Japanese: 恋する水族館だゾ)	June 22, 2012
774	"Not Frustrated" (Japanese: くやしくないゾ)	June 22, 2012
775	"Searching for a New Destination" (Japanese: 引っ越し先を探すゾ)	June 29, 2012
775	"Anticipating Summer" (Japanese: 夏を先取りするゾ)	June 29, 2012
775	"Watermelon Love" (Japanese: スイカ好きだゾ)	June 29, 2012
776	"Not Forgetting Action Mask" (Japanese: アクション仮面を忘れないゾ)	July 6, 2012
776	"Increasing the Women's Work Force" (Japanese: 女子力をあげるゾ)	July 6, 2012
776	"Regaining Memories" (Japanese: キオクをとりもどすゾ)	July 6, 2012
777	"Part Time Job at a Beach House" (Japanese: 海の家でアルバイトだゾ)	July 13, 2012
777	"Getting Up Early" (Japanese: 早起きしちゃったゾ)	July 13, 2012
777	"The Sea is Okay" (Japanese: 海はいいだゾ)	July 13, 2012
778	"Itchy Insects are Getting in the Way" (Japanese: カユ〜イおジャマ虫だゾ)	July 27, 2012
778	"Pocketbook Defense Corps" (Japanese: 防衛隊の手帖だゾ)	July 27, 2012
778	"Me and Daddy's Dinosaur Classroom" (Japanese: オラと父ちゃんの恐竜教室だゾ)	July 27, 2012
779	"The Salayman's Sinking Noodles" (Japanese: 流しサラリーマンそうめんだゾ)	August 10, 2012
779	"Water is Also Dripping on Shiro" (Japanese: 水もしたたるシロだゾ)	August 10, 2012
780	"Shrimp Festival" (Japanese: エビまつりだゾ)	August 17, 2012
780	"Ai-chan's Shopping" (Japanese: あいちゃんのおつかいだゾ)	August 17, 2012
781	"Addicted to Skimmer" (Japanese: スキマにはまったゾ)	August 24, 2012
781	"Summer's Road Home" (Japanese: 夏の帰り道だゾ)	August 24, 2012
782	"A Couple Consulted About a Crisis" (Japanese: 夫婦の危機を相談されるゾ)	August 31, 2012
782	"Preparing for the Definite Hour" (Japanese: まさかの時に備えるゾ)	August 31, 2012
783	"Tonight has Lots of Confusion" (Japanese: 今夜はいろいろややこしいゾ)	September 14, 2012
784	"The Wolf Man in Kasukabe" (Japanese: 狼男カスカベだゾ)	October 19, 2012
784	"Washing the Curtain" (Japanese: カーテンを洗っちゃうゾ)	October 19, 2012
785	"Playing in Mud Feels Okay" (Japanese: 泥んこあそびは気持ちいいゾ)	October 26, 2012
785	"Mommy's Nap is a Secret" (Japanese: 母ちゃんのお昼寝は内緒だゾ)	October 26, 2012
786	"Hiroshi Nohara's Dragonfly" (Japanese: トンボの野原ひろしだゾ)	November 9, 2012
786	"Take Back the Seal" (Japanese: シールを取り返すゾ)	November 9, 2012
787	"Coming to Kindergarten in a Kimono" (Japanese: 着物で幼稚園に来ちゃったゾ)	November 16, 2012
787	"Selecting a Memorable Gift to Receive" (Japanese: 引き出物選びはモメモメだゾ)	November 16, 2012
788	"Sell the Book" (Japanese: 本を売りたいゾ)	November 23, 2012
788	"The Tight Toy Box" (Japanese: おもちゃ箱はキツキツだゾ)	November 23, 2012
789	"Being Popular is Not the Same as Wood Inlay" (Japanese: モテキじゃなくイレキだゾ)	November 30, 2012
789	"Daddy and Correspondance" (Japanese: 父ちゃんとブンツーだゾ)	November 30, 2012
790	"Himawari and My Bear's Ears" (Japanese: ひまわりと耳おれクマだゾ)	December 7, 2012
790	"Cuscon" (Japanese: カスコンだゾ)	December 7, 2012

== 2013 ==
No.	Title	Original release date
791	"Determining the Captain of the Defense Corps" (Japanese: 防衛隊の隊長を決めるゾ)	January 11, 2013
791	"Seeing a Dream of Seeing" (Japanese: 見たい夢を見るゾ)	January 11, 2013
792	"Not Unraveling" (Japanese: ほどけないゾ)	January 18, 2013
792	"Who Angered Encho-sensei?" (Japanese: 園長先生を怒らせたのは誰？だゾ)	January 18, 2013
793	"Deciding on a Sky Tree" (Japanese: スカイツリーでキメるゾ)	January 25, 2013
793	"Kyary Landed" (Japanese: きゃりー来航だゾ)	January 25, 2013
794	"The Family Travels to Kusatsu" (Japanese: 草津へ家族旅行だゾ)	February 1, 2013
795	"Keeping up with the Recycle Shop" (Japanese: リサイクルショップについて行くゾ)	February 15, 2013
795	"Today is Cold" (Japanese: 今日は寒〜いゾ)	February 15, 2013
796	"Shiro and Contest" (Japanese: シロとコンテストだゾ)	February 22, 2013
796	"Helping of Moving" (Japanese: 引っ越しのお手伝いだゾ)	February 22, 2013
797	"Middle Students are Here" (Japanese: 中学生が来たゾ)	March 1, 2013
797	"Passionate! Athletic Park" (Japanese: 熱血！アスレチック公園だゾ)	March 1, 2013
SPECIAL–70	"The Shinnosuke Floating Plate Again" (Japanese: またまた流れ板しんのすけだゾ)	March 15, 2013
SPECIAL–70	"A Randsel is a Backpack" (Japanese: ランドセルを背負いたいゾ)	March 15, 2013
SPECIAL–70	"Kasukabe Defence Force <Again>" (Japanese: カスカベ防衛隊だゾ〈再〉)	March 15, 2013
SPECIAL–71	"Crayon Shin-chan: The Storm Called!: Me and the Space Princess (2012) (Director: Souichi Masui)" (Japanese: クレヨンしんちゃん 嵐を呼ぶ!オラと宇宙のプリンセス（2012年）（監督：増井壮一）)	April 19, 2013
798	"B Division's Gourmet Tower" (Japanese: B級グルメの塔だゾ)	April 26, 2013
799	"Curry Tournament of Dreams" (Japanese: 夢のカレー大会だゾ)	May 3, 2013
799	"Horror! Phantom Dentist" (Japanese: 恐怖！怪人歯医者だゾ)	May 3, 2013
800	"Searching for the Key of Friendship" (Japanese: 友情の鍵探しだゾ)	May 10, 2013
800	"Compressing a Futon" (Japanese: 布団を圧縮するゾ)	May 10, 2013
801	"Nene-chan in a Slump" (Japanese: ネネちゃんがスランプだゾ)	May 17, 2013
801	"The Red Scorpion Corps Prohibit Love" (Japanese: 紅サソリ隊は恋愛禁止だゾ)	May 17, 2013
802	"Grandpa's Visiting Day" (Japanese: じいちゃんの参観日だゾ)	May 24, 2013
802	"Where is Father's Fountain Pen?" (Japanese: お父様の万年筆はどこ？だゾ)	May 24, 2013
803	"Ultraviolet is Scary" (Japanese: シガイセンはこわいゾ)	May 31, 2013
803	"Confrontation! Ninja Land" (Japanese: 対決！忍者ランドだゾ)	May 31, 2013
804	"Kasukabe Defence Force's Dissolution" (Japanese: かすかべ防衛隊の解散だゾ)	June 7, 2013
804	"The Return of P Man" (Japanese: ピーマンを返すゾ)	June 7, 2013
805	"Go to Shellfish Gathering!" (Japanese: 潮干狩りへゴー！だゾ)	June 14, 2013
805	"The Umbrella is Full" (Japanese: 傘がいっぱいだゾ)	June 14, 2013
806	"Mommy is Discharged From the Hospital" (Japanese: 母ちゃんが入院して退院しだゾ)	June 21, 2013
806	"Mommy is Admitted to the Hospital" (Japanese: 母ちゃんが退院して入院したゾ)	June 21, 2013
807	"Enjoying the Hospitalization" (Japanese: 入院生活をマンキツするゾ)	July 5, 2013
807	"Midsummer Snowman" (Japanese: 真夏の雪だるまだゾ)	July 5, 2013
808	"Lone Salaryman" (Japanese: 子連れサラリーマンだゾ)	July 12, 2013
808	"Mommy is Discharged" (Japanese: 母ちゃんが退院するゾ)	July 12, 2013
SPECIAL–72	"Cooling a Watermelon" (Japanese: スイカを冷やすゾ)	August 2, 2013
SPECIAL–72	"I'm Masao!" (Japanese: 俺はマサオだぜ！だゾ)	August 2, 2013
SPECIAL–72	"Staying in the Country (2011) <again>" (Japanese: 田舎にとまるゾ（2011年）〈再〉)	August 2, 2013
SPECIAL–72	"I Want a Room" (Japanese: オラの部屋がほしいゾ)	August 2, 2013
SPECIAL–72	"Crayon Human Face" (Japanese: 人面クレヨンだゾ)	August 2, 2013
809	"Kindergarten Ghost Story" (Japanese: 幼稚園の怪談だゾ)	August 9, 2013
809	"Daddy and Pool" (Japanese: 父ちゃんとプールだゾ)	August 9, 2013
810	"The Mysterious Kaguya-san" (Japanese: 謎のかぐやさんだゾ)	August 16, 2013
810	"Shiro's Cat Tower" (Japanese: シロのキャットタワーだゾ)	August 16, 2013
811	"Seeing the CM" (Japanese: CMが見たいゾ)	August 23, 2013
811	"Swaying Swing Girl" (Japanese: ゆれるブランコ少女だゾ)	August 23, 2013
812	"Searching for Mommy's Treasure" (Japanese: 母ちゃんのお宝を探すゾ)	August 30, 2013
812	"Madame's Large Rotation" (Japanese: 大回転マダムだゾ)	August 30, 2013
813	"The Culprit is Kazama-kun" (Japanese: 犯人は風間くんだゾ)	September 6, 2013
813	"Handmade Jiaozi" (Japanese: 手作りギョーザだゾ)	September 6, 2013
814	"Bowling Showdown" (Japanese: ボウリング対決だゾ)	October 18, 2013
814	"Mommy's Past" (Japanese: 母ちゃんの過去だゾ)	October 18, 2013
815	"The Ice Cream of Friendship" (Japanese: 友情のアイスだゾ)	October 25, 2013
815	"Getting Skinny This Time" (Japanese: 今度こそやせたいゾ)	October 25, 2013
816	"Treasure Get in Spain" (Japanese: スペインでお宝ゲットだゾ)	November 1, 2013
817	"Being Chased by Kazama-kun" (Japanese: 風間くんに追われてるゾ)	November 15, 2013
817	"Selling at a Flea Mar" (Japanese: フリマで売りたいゾ)	November 15, 2013
818	"Housecleaning is Noisy" (Japanese: 大そうじはバタバタだゾ)	December 13, 2013
818	"Make a Dream Cafe" (Japanese: 夢のカフェをつくるゾ)	December 13, 2013

== 2014 ==
No.	Title	Original release date
819	"Our Home Electronics Products" (Japanese: オラたち家電製品だゾ)	January 17, 2014
820	"Classroom Footrace" (Japanese: かけっこ教室だゾ)	January 31, 2014
820	"Shiro's Walking Friends" (Japanese: シロのお散歩ともだちだゾ)	January 31, 2014
821	"Wakasagi Fishing" (Japanese: ワカサギ釣りだゾ)	February 7, 2014
821	"Action Mask has Unknown Whereabouts" (Japanese: アクション仮面が行方不明だゾ)	February 7, 2014
822	"Daddy Doesn't Have Sunday" (Japanese: 父ちゃんの日曜はツイてないゾ)	February 14, 2014
822	"Lunch Art Showdown" (Japanese: ランチでアート対決だゾ)	February 14, 2014
823	"Daddy is Walking Full" (Japanese: 父ちゃんよりいっぱい歩くゾ)	February 28, 2014
823	"Go-chan. is Here" (Japanese: ゴーちゃん。が来たゾ)	February 28, 2014
SPECIAL–73	"The Consumption Tax Rose" (Japanese: 消費税が上がるゾ)	March 7, 2014
SPECIAL–73	"The Idol Superior is Here" (Japanese: アイドル先輩が来たゾ)	March 7, 2014
SPECIAL–73	"Going to Eat Chocobi Ice" (Japanese: チョコビアイスが食べたいゾ)	March 7, 2014
824	"Patience Showdown" (Japanese: ガマン対決だゾ)	March 14, 2014
824	"Heal Daddy" (Japanese: 父ちゃんをいやすゾ)	March 14, 2014
825	"The Space Police Dog - Robo Dog" (Japanese: 宇宙警察犬・ロボドッグだゾ)	April 11, 2014
SPECIAL–74	"Crayon Shin-chan: Very Tasty! B-class Gourmet Survival!! (2013) (Director: Masakazu Hashimoto)" (Japanese: クレヨンしんちゃん バカうまっ!B級グルメサバイバル!!（2013年）（監督：橋本昌和）)	April 12, 2014
826	"Brother Masao" (Japanese: マサオ兄ちゃんだゾ)	April 18, 2014
826	"Daddy's Compensatory Leave" (Japanese: 代休父ちゃんだゾ)	April 18, 2014
827	"Lost Piggy" (Japanese: まいごのコブタだゾ)	April 25, 2014
827	"Sommelier's Rental Shop" (Japanese: レンタルショップのソムリエだゾ)	April 25, 2014
828	"Going to Father Farm" (Japanese: ファザー牧場に行くゾ)	May 2, 2014
828	"Weather Brother" (Japanese: お天気お兄さんだゾ)	May 2, 2014
829	"Get Ai-chan's Lunch" (Japanese: あいちゃんのお弁当をいただくゾ)	May 16, 2014
829	"Sorting by Moving" (Japanese: 引越しで仕分けるゾ)	May 16, 2014
830	"Butler Café" (Japanese: 執事喫茶だゾ)	May 23, 2014
830	"Shiro and Change" (Japanese: シロとチェンジだゾ)	May 23, 2014
831	"Experience School" (Japanese: お塾を体験するゾ)	May 30, 2014
831	"Play with Domino" (Japanese: ドミノで遊ぶゾ)	May 30, 2014
832	"Suddenly! Next to Noon's Rice" (Japanese: 突然！となりの昼ごはんだゾ)	June 6, 2014
832	"Cannot Cut the Hard Nails" (Japanese: なかなか爪が切れないゾ)	June 6, 2014
833	"Rain Today too" (Japanese: 今日も雨だゾ)	June 13, 2014
833	"Adventure to Buy a Swimsuit" (Japanese: 冒険水着を買うゾ)	June 13, 2014
834	"Roots of Roots of Roots" (Japanese: ねのねのねだゾ)	June 20, 2014
834	"Changing the LED" (Japanese: LEDにかえるゾ)	June 20, 2014
835	"The Soccer Showdown that Absolutely Cannot be Lost" (Japanese: 絶対に負けられないサッカー対決だゾ)	June 27, 2014
836	"Wandering Defense Corps" (Japanese: さすらいの防衛隊だゾ)	July 11, 2014
836	"Sales Lady of Hell Returns" (Japanese: 地獄のセールスレディ・リターンズだゾ)	July 11, 2014
837	"Musae-chan's Car Training" (Japanese: むさえちゃんの自動車教習だゾ)	August 8, 2014
837	"I Saw! Kasukabe City Legend Gachagacha Man" (Japanese: オラは見た！カスカベ都市伝説 ガチャガチャ人間だゾ)	August 8, 2014
838	"Musae-chan can Take the License?" (Japanese: むさえちゃんは免許を取れるのカ？だゾ)	August 29, 2014
838	"Legend Of the Beaten Rabbit" (Japanese: レジェンド オブ なぐられうさぎだゾ)	August 29, 2014
839	"Going to Planetarium" (Japanese: プラネタリウムに行くゾ)	September 12, 2014
839	"Produce an Idol" (Japanese: アイドルをプロデュースするゾ)	September 12, 2014
840	"Bo-chan has Become Anxious" (Japanese: ボーちゃんが気になるゾ)	September 19, 2014
840	"Leaving the Evening Food" (Japanese: 晩ごはんはまかせろだゾ)	September 19, 2014
841	"Oyugi Meeting Preparation" (Japanese: おゆうぎ会の準備だゾ)	October 17, 2014
841	"Himawari's Scary Thing" (Japanese: ひまわりの怖いものだゾ)	October 17, 2014
842	"Satoimo Digging" (Japanese: サトイモ掘りだゾ)	October 24, 2014
842	"Invective Popular Person" (Japanese: 毒舌で人気者だゾ)	October 24, 2014
843	"Going to Women School's School Festival" (Japanese: 女子校の学園祭にいくゾ)	October 31, 2014
843	"Want to Hear a Rare Voice" (Japanese: レアなボイスがききたいゾ)	October 31, 2014
844	"Chase Nene-chan's Eco Bag!" (Japanese: ネネちゃんのエコバッグを追え！だゾ)	November 21, 2014
844	"Putting Toys Away" (Japanese: おもちゃをかたづけるゾ)	November 21, 2014
845	"Daddy and Surf Fishing" (Japanese: 父ちゃんと磯釣りだゾ)	November 28, 2014
845	"Where did the Manuscript go!?" (Japanese: 原稿はどこへいった！？だゾ)	November 28, 2014
846	"Losing the Mobile Phone" (Japanese: 携帯電話をなくしたゾ)	December 5, 2014
846	"At the Smarpho" (Japanese: スマホにするゾ)	December 5, 2014
847	"Exciting Smarpho" (Japanese: スマホでドキドキだゾ)	December 12, 2014
847	"Year-end Party of Defense Corps" (Japanese: 防衛隊の忘年会だゾ)	December 12, 2014

== 2015 ==
No.	Title	Original release date
848	"The Cozy Hot Water Bottle" (Japanese: 湯たんぽでぬくぬくだゾ)	January 9, 2015
848	"Definitely Pick Up the Stone" (Japanese: ゼッタイに拾いたい石だゾ)	January 9, 2015
849	"The Snow Inn of Mystery" (Japanese: 雪の宿のミステリーだゾ)	January 30, 2015
850	"Dancing Mommy Number 29" (Japanese: アゲアゲ母ちゃん29号だゾ)	February 6, 2015
850	"Orange of Love" (Japanese: 愛のみかんだゾ)	February 6, 2015
851	"Thank You Very Dog" (Japanese: サンキューベリードッグだゾ)	February 13, 2015
851	"Kazama-kun and Shopping" (Japanese: 風間くんとおつかいだゾ)	February 13, 2015
852	"The Parakeet Came!" (Japanese: インコがきた！だゾ)	February 20, 2015
852	"Suspicion!? Daddy's Photo" (Japanese: 疑惑！？父ちゃんの写真だゾ)	February 20, 2015
853	"Tennis Showdown" (Japanese: テニスで対決だゾ)	February 27, 2015
853	"Honya-san Sign Session" (Japanese: 本屋さんでサイン会だゾ)	February 27, 2015
SPECIAL–75	"Michi & Yoshirin and Real Play House" (Japanese: ミッチー&ヨシりんとリアルおままごとだゾ)	March 6, 2015
SPECIAL–75	"Thus the Young Couple Bought a House - Part one・Part two" (Japanese: 若い二人はこうして家を買ったゾ 前編・後編)	March 6, 2015
854	"Himawari Cannot Sleep" (Japanese: ひまわりが眠れないゾ)	March 13, 2015
854	"Secret of Under the Floor" (Japanese: 床下のヒミツだゾ)	March 13, 2015
855	"Wearing" (Japanese: かぶってるゾ)	March 20, 2015
855	"Buy a Cleaner" (Japanese: 掃除機を買うゾ)	March 20, 2015
SPECIAL–76	"Crayon Shin-chan: Serious Battle! Robot Dad Strikes Back (2014) (Director: Wataru Takahashi)" (Japanese: クレヨンしんちゃん ガチンコ!逆襲のロボとーちゃん（2014年）（監督：高橋渉）)	April 10, 2015
856	"Great Bamboo Shoot Raid" (Japanese: たけのこ大襲撃だゾ)	April 17, 2015
857	"Cannot Enter the House" (Japanese: 家に入れないゾ)	April 24, 2015
857	"Calling on the Internet" (Japanese: インターネットでお電話するゾ)	April 24, 2015
858	"Shiro's Moving Story" (Japanese: シロの引越し物語だゾ)	May 1, 2015
858	"Seeing Chinanago" (Japanese: ちんあなごを見たいゾ)	May 1, 2015
859	"Fracture Daddy" (Japanese: 骨折父ちゃんだゾ)	May 8, 2015
859	"Produce a Loose Chara" (Japanese: ゆるキャラをプロデュースするゾ)	May 8, 2015
860	"~Fracture Daddy~ Attendant" (Japanese: ～骨折父ちゃん～つきそいするゾ)	May 15, 2015
860	"Pick a Bag" (Japanese: バッグを拾ったゾ)	May 15, 2015
861	"~Fracture Daddy~ Remove Gipsum" (Japanese: ～骨折父ちゃん～ギプスをはずすゾ)	May 22, 2015
861	"Shinobu-chan and Caretaker" (Japanese: 忍ちゃんとお留守番だゾ)	May 22, 2015
862	"Twins are Here" (Japanese: 双子がきたゾ)	May 29, 2015
863	"It's Raining in Kasukabe Today, Too" (Japanese: 春我部は今日も雨だったゾ)	June 5, 2015
863	"The Crimson Scorpion Squad Break Up" (Japanese: 紅さそり隊解散だゾ)	June 5, 2015
864	"Taking a Lock Screen Photo" (Japanese: 待ち受け画像を撮るゾ)	June 12, 2015
864	"Here Comes Zakiyama-san" (Japanese: ザキヤマさんが来〜る〜だゾ)	June 12, 2015
865	"A Drone Is Watching" (Japanese: ドローンは見てたゾ)	June 19, 2015
865	"The Saleslady From Hell Strikes Back" (Japanese: 地獄のセールスレディ逆襲だゾ)	June 19, 2015
866	"Summer Trip Meeting" (Japanese: 夏のおでかけ会議だゾ)	June 26, 2015
866	"Pickled Vegetables Debut" (Japanese: ぬか漬けデビューだゾ)	June 26, 2015
867	"Turning the Table" (Japanese: テーブルを回すゾ)	July 10, 2015
867	"Get Up Early with Radio Calisthenics" (Japanese: ラジオ体操で早起きだゾ)	July 10, 2015
868	"The Pure Heart Kakigōri" (Japanese: 純情かき氷だゾ)	July 31, 2015
868	"Hot Blooded! Shūzō-sensei and the Pool" (Japanese: 熱血!修造先生とプールだゾ)	July 31, 2015
869	"Going Camping" (Japanese: キャンプへ行くゾ)	August 21, 2015
870	"Game with Himitsu-chan" (Japanese: ひみつちゃんと勝負だゾ)	August 28, 2015
870	"Himitsu-chan is a Friend" (Japanese: ひみつちゃんは友だちだゾ)	August 28, 2015
871	"Catch a Phantom Cicada" (Japanese: 幻のセミを捕るゾ)	September 11, 2015
871	"Nagure Rabbit <Foam>" (Japanese: なぐられうさぎ＜泡＞だゾ)	September 11, 2015
872	"The Zoo is Exciting" (Japanese: 動物園はウキウッキーだゾ)	October 9, 2015
873	"Pounding with Octopus Par" (Japanese: たこパーでドキドキだゾ)	October 16, 2015
873	"Showdown with Tsumiki" (Japanese: つみ木で対決だゾ)	October 16, 2015
874	"A Woman Who Throws Away His Mom" (Japanese: 母ちゃんは捨てる女だゾ)	October 23, 2015
874	"Road Safety Warrior in Love" (Japanese: 恋の交通安全戦士だゾ)	October 23, 2015
875	"Dad and Paper Sumo" (Japanese: 父ちゃんと紙相撲だゾ)	October 30, 2015
875	"Worry with Masao-kun" (Japanese: マサオくんを心配するゾ)	October 30, 2015
876	"Kendama of the Brave" (Japanese: 勇者のけん玉だゾ)	November 6, 2015
876	"Cursed Amidakuji" (Japanese: 呪いのあみだくじだゾ)	November 6, 2015
877	"Kazama-kun's Goal" (Japanese: 風間くんのゴールだゾ)	November 13, 2015
877	"Shiro the Police Dog" (Japanese: 警察犬シロだゾ)	November 13, 2015
877	"Ai-chan is Imechen" (Japanese: あいちゃんがイメチェンだゾ)	November 13, 2015
878	"Wher〜e's Daddy?" (Japanese: 父ちゃんはど～こだ?だゾ)	November 20, 2015
878	"Let's Get a Flatulence" (Japanese: おならが出そうだゾ)	November 20, 2015
878	"Relying on a Work Person" (Japanese: 仕事人に頼んだゾ)	November 20, 2015
879	"Graduating From a Napping Housewife" (Japanese: ゴロ寝主婦を卒業するゾ)	November 27, 2015
879	"Bibibi with Static Electricity!" (Japanese: 静電気でビビビ！だゾ)	November 27, 2015
879	"I'm a Worker" (Japanese: おら仕事人だゾ)	November 27, 2015
880	"Go to See the Illuminations" (Japanese: イルミネーションを見にいくゾ)	December 4, 2015
880	"Serious Game with Gloves" (Japanese: 手袋で真剣勝負だゾ)	December 4, 2015
881	"Love Skating Strategy" (Japanese: 恋のスケート大作戦だゾ)	December 11, 2015
881	"Giant Wealth App" (Japanese: 恐怖のアプリだゾ)	December 11, 2015

== 2016 ==
No.	Title	Original release date
882	"Go to a Secret Hot Spring" (Japanese: 秘湯に行くゾ)	January 15, 2016
883	"I Can't Sleep" (Japanese: 眠れないオラだゾ)	January 22, 2016
883	"Dad's Husband for the Time Being" (Japanese: 父ちゃんのとりあえず主夫だゾ)	January 22, 2016
883	"Nene-chan's Piano Recital" (Japanese: ネネちゃんのピアノリサイタルだゾ)	January 22, 2016
884	"Sleepless Dad" (Japanese: 眠れない父ちゃんだゾ)	January 29, 2016
884	"I Don't Like the Bath!" (Japanese: お風呂はイヤイヤ!だゾ)	January 29, 2016
884	"Battle of Me and Snow" (Japanese: オラと雪の合戦だゾ)	January 29, 2016
885	"Shiro Can't Sleep" (Japanese: 眠れないシロだゾ)	February 5, 2016
885	"Shiro Got Fat" (Japanese: シロが太っちゃったゾ)	February 5, 2016
885	"I'm a Fashion Leader" (Japanese: オラはファッションリーダーだゾ)	February 5, 2016
886	"Mom Can't Sleep" (Japanese: 眠れない母ちゃんだゾ)	February 12, 2016
886	"Love Through the Glass" (Japanese: ガラス越しの恋だゾ)	February 12, 2016
886	"We Want to Stop the Hiccoughs" (Japanese: しゃっくりを止めたいゾ)	February 12, 2016
887	"Looking forward to making mochi!" (Japanese: おもちつきが楽しみだゾ)	February 19, 2016
887	"The Supermarket Demonstration Salesman is Here!" (Japanese: スーパー実演販売士がきたゾ)	February 19, 2016
888	"Our Hazard Map" (Japanese: オラたちのハザードマップだゾ)	February 26, 2016
888	"Catching Meat" (Japanese: お肉をキャッチするゾ)	February 26, 2016
SPECIAL–77	"Suspense on the Bullet Train" (新幹線でサスペンスだゾ)	March 4, 2016
SPECIAL–77	"Kazama-kun Doesn’t Forget Things" (風間くんは忘れ物しないゾ)	March 4, 2016
SPECIAL–77	"Buying New Shoes" (新しい靴を買うゾ)	March 4, 2016
889	"It Involves His Manliness" (Japanese: 男の沽券にかかわるゾ)	March 11, 2016
889	"Going to Find Miss Nanako" (Japanese: ななこおねいさんを探しに行くゾ)	March 11, 2016
SPECIAL–78	"Crayon Shin-chan: My Moving Story! Cactus Large Attack! (2015) (Director: Masakazu Hashimoto)" (Japanese: クレヨンしんちゃん オラの引越し物語 サボテン大襲撃（2015年）（監督：橋本昌和）)	April 1, 2016
890	"Dad Won't Wake Up!? (Part 1)" (Japanese: 父ちゃんが起きない！？だゾ（前編）)	April 15, 2016
891	"Art While Sleeping" (Japanese: 寝ている間にアートだゾ)	April 22, 2016
891	"Supporting Matsuzaka-sensei" (Japanese: まつざか先生を応援するゾ)	April 22, 2016
892	"I Want to See the Face of the Uncle Next Door" (Japanese: 隣のおじさんの顔が見たいゾ)	April 29, 2016
892	"I Got Angry with Kazama-kun" (Japanese: 風間くんと怒られちゃったゾ)	April 29, 2016
893	"It's Hard to Go Out" (Japanese: お出かけするのもひと苦労だゾ)	May 6, 2016
893	"Masao-kun's Masamu" (Japanese: マサオくんの正夢だゾ)	May 6, 2016
894	"A rice planting experience!" (Japanese: 田植え体験だゾ)	May 13, 2016
894	"The Adventures of Buriburizaemon: The Revival Chapter" (Japanese: ぶりぶりざえもんの冒険 覚醒編)	May 13, 2016
895	"Gathering Things to Wash" (Japanese: 洗濯物を集めるゾ)	May 20, 2016
895	"The Adventures of Buriburizaemon: The Flashing Chapter" (Japanese: ぶりぶりざえもんの冒険 閃光編)	May 20, 2016
896	"Yoshinaga-sensei is Fired?!" (Japanese: よしなが先生がクビ!?だゾ)	May 27, 2016
896	"Bo-chan is Obsessive" (Japanese: ボーちゃんはこだわるゾ)	May 27, 2016
897	"Measure with a Stopwatch" (Japanese: ストップウォッチではかるゾ)	June 10, 2016
897	"Scary Dentist" (Japanese: こわ～い歯医者さんだゾ)	June 10, 2016
897	"Shiro and Chick" (Japanese: シロとひな鳥だゾ)	June 10, 2016
898	"Weird Shumi" (Japanese: 変わったシュミだゾ)	June 17, 2016
898	"I'm in the Mud" (Japanese: 泥んこでただいまだゾ)	June 17, 2016
898	"It's a Good Day to Change Jobs on Rainy Days" (Japanese: 雨の日は転職日和だゾ)	June 17, 2016
899	"Thread" (Japanese: 糸を通すゾ)	June 24, 2016
899	"Dad is a Shaved Head (Part 1)" (Japanese: 父ちゃんが坊主頭だゾ（前編）)	June 24, 2016
900	"Masao-kun Who Wants to Remember" (Japanese: 思い出したいマサオくんだゾ)	July 8, 2016
900	"Dad and Hell Saleslady" (Japanese: 父ちゃんと地獄のセールスレディだゾ)	July 8, 2016
901	"Did You See Me?!" (Japanese: み〜た〜わ〜ね〜だゾ)	July 22, 2016
901	"Shinnosuke VS Shin Godzilla" (Japanese: しんのすけ対シン・ゴジラだゾ)	July 22, 2016
902	"Growing Edamame" (Japanese: 枝豆を育てるゾ)	July 29, 2016
902	"The Adventures of Buriburizaemon: The National Unification Chapter" (Japanese: ぶりぶりざえもんの冒険 天下統一編)	July 29, 2016
903	"Cleaning Out the Fridge" (Japanese: 冷蔵庫のおかたづけだゾ)	August 5, 2016
903	"Shinnosuke the Taxi Driver" (Japanese: タクシードライバーしんのすけだゾ)	August 5, 2016
904	"You and Lee Are Here" (Japanese: ユーとリーが来たゾ)	August 12, 2016
904	"I Got a Goldfish" (Japanese: 金魚をもらったゾ)	August 12, 2016
905	"All-You-Can-Dress is Hot" (Japanese: 着せ放題がアツいゾ)	August 19, 2016
905	"Kazama-kun Who Wants to Draw Lots" (Japanese: くじを引きたい風間くんだゾ)	August 19, 2016
906	"Shop at the Last-minute" (Japanese: ギリギリで買い物するゾ)	August 26, 2016
906	"Masao-kun Who Has a Heavy Feeling" (Japanese: 思いが重いマサオくんだゾ)	August 26, 2016
907	"I Want to Break the Blocks" (Japanese: つみきをくずしたいゾ)	September 9, 2016
907	"I Want to Eat Chilled Chinese" (Japanese: 冷やし中華が食べたいゾ)	September 9, 2016
907	"Give a Handmade Brooch" (Japanese: 手作りブローチをあげるゾ)	September 9, 2016
908	"Help Mom" (Japanese: 母ちゃんを手伝うゾ)	September 16, 2016
908	"I Want to Hold Hands with Nanako Sister" (Japanese: ななこおねいさんと手をつなぎたいゾ)	September 16, 2016
908	"I Want to Show You Magic Tricks" (Japanese: 手品を見せたいゾ)	September 16, 2016
909	"Playing Company with Dad" (Japanese: 父ちゃんと会社ごっこだゾ)	October 14, 2016
909	"Dice Train" (Japanese: サイコロ電車だゾ)	October 14, 2016
910	"The Bath is a Battle (First Part)" (Japanese: お風呂は戦闘だゾ（前編）)	October 21, 2016
910	"The Bath is a Battle" (Japanese: お風呂は戦闘だゾ)	October 21, 2016
911	"The Tape Stuck" (Japanese: テープがくっついたゾ)	October 28, 2016
911	"Gratin is Hot" (Japanese: グラタンは熱～いゾ)	October 28, 2016
911	"Share a Snack" (Japanese: おやつをシェアするゾ)	October 28, 2016
912	"Naughty Himawari" (Japanese: いたずらっ子ひまわりだゾ)	November 4, 2016
912	"Kanikani Battle" (Japanese: カニカニバトルだゾ)	November 4, 2016
912	"Support with a Fan" (Japanese: うちわで応援するゾ)	November 4, 2016
913	"Buriburizaemon's Petit Adventure Twilight Edition" (Japanese: ぶりぶりざえもんのプチ冒険 夕暮れ編)	November 18, 2016
913	"Buy a New Nohara Family Car ① The Car Broke" (Japanese: 野原家新車を買う① 車が壊れたゾ)	November 18, 2016
913	"Kasukabe International Police Special Investigation Team Chase the Phantom Thief Sleeping Cat!" (Japanese: カスカベ国際警察特捜班 怪盗眠りネコを追え！だゾ)	November 18, 2016
914	"Let's Go See the Autumn Leaves" (Japanese: 紅葉を見にいこうよ～だゾ)	November 25, 2016
914	"Buy a New Nohara Family Car ② The Foreign Car is a Man's Maron" (Japanese: 野原家新車を買う② 外車は男のマロンだゾ)	November 25, 2016
914	"I Want to Join the Red Scorpion Corps" (Japanese: 紅さそり隊に入りたいゾ)	November 25, 2016
915	"Nohara Family Buy a New Car ③ Finally Buy a New Car" (Japanese: 野原家新車を買う③ とうとう車を買うゾ)	December 2, 2016
915	"Search for Musae-chan's House" (Japanese: むさえちゃん家を大捜索だゾ)	December 2, 2016
916	"Nanako-sensei" (Japanese: ななこ先生だゾ)	December 9, 2016
916	"Game! Figure Skating Castle" (Japanese: 勝負！フィギュアスケート城だゾ)	December 9, 2016
917	"There is a Year-end" (Japanese: 年末あるあるだゾ)	December 16, 2016
917	"What's Wrong with Nene-chan!?" (Japanese: どうしたネネちゃん!?だゾ)	December 16, 2016
917	"I Want to See But I Can't See" (Japanese: 見たいのに見られないゾ)	December 16, 2016

== 2017 ==
No.	Title	Original release date
918	"My Shoes Are Missing" (Japanese: オラのクツが行方不明だゾ)	January 13, 2017
918	"I Want to Get Up Early and Save Money" (Japanese: 早起きしてトクしたいゾ)	January 13, 2017
919	"Skiing in Akita" (Japanese: 秋田でスキーだゾ)	January 20, 2017
920	"Help the Bookstore" (Japanese: 本屋さんをお助けするゾ)	January 27, 2017
920	"Himawari Caught a Cold" (Japanese: ひまわりがカゼをひいたゾ)	January 27, 2017
921	"Khao in the Shopping District" (Japanese: 商店街のカオだゾ)	February 3, 2017
921	"I Want a New Pillow" (Japanese: 新しい枕がほしいゾ)	February 3, 2017
922	"Sunflower Group Leader Teacher" (Japanese: ひまわり組の組長先生だゾ)	February 10, 2017
922	"Kasukabe International Police Special Investigation Team Chocolate Panic" (Japanese: カスカベ国際警察特捜班 チョコレートパニックだゾ)	February 10, 2017
923	"Horror French Doll" (Japanese: 恐怖のフランス人形だゾ)	February 17, 2017
923	"Play Outside Even If It’s Cold" (Japanese: 寒くても外で遊ぶゾ)	February 17, 2017
924	"Matsuzaka-sensei’s Shiro" (Japanese: まつざか先生のシロだゾ)	February 24, 2017
924	"Ai-chan’s SP Has Changed" (Japanese: あいちゃんのSPが変わったゾ)	February 24, 2017
SPECIAL–79	"Kumamoto’s Grandpa’s Secret" (Japanese: 熊本のじいちゃんのヒミツだゾ)	March 3, 2017
SPECIAL–79	"Go to See the Stars" (Japanese: 星を見に行くゾ)	March 3, 2017
SPECIAL–79	"I’m Back! Forensic Shin-chan" (Japanese: 帰ってきた!鑑識しんちゃんだゾ)	March 3, 2017
925	"Have a Family Photo Taken" (Japanese: 家族写真を撮ってもらうゾ)	March 17, 2017
925	"Tour the Fire Station" (Japanese: 消防署を見学するゾ)	March 17, 2017
SPECIAL–80	"Crayon Shin-chan: Fast Asleep! Dreaming World Big Assault! (2016) (Director: Wataru Takahashi)" (Japanese: クレヨンしんちゃん 爆睡!ユメミーワールド大突撃（2016年）（監督：高橋渉）)	April 7, 2017
926	"Space Kasukabe Defense Corps" (Japanese: 宇宙カスカベ防衛隊だゾ)	April 14, 2017
927	"Fever with Conveyor Belt Sushi" (Japanese: 回転ずしでフィーバーだゾ)	April 21, 2017
927	"The Frog Purse is in a Pinch" (Japanese: カエルの財布がピンチだゾ)	April 21, 2017
928	"Tea Picking at Sayamarland" (Japanese: サヤマーランドで茶摘みだゾ)	April 28, 2017
928	"Make a Lot of Money with Space Pigs" (Japanese: 宇宙ブタで大もうけだゾ)	April 28, 2017
929	"Make the Windows Shiny" (Japanese: 窓をピカピカにするゾ)	May 12, 2017
929	"Play Golf" (Japanese: ゴルフで勝負だゾ)	May 12, 2017
930	"Coming Out Tournament" (Japanese: カミングアウト大会だゾ)	May 19, 2017
930	"Mom Who Can’t Refuse" (Japanese: 断れない母ちゃんだゾ)	May 19, 2017
931	"Our Twins" (Japanese: オラたち双子だゾ)	May 26, 2017
931	"Sumo with Dad" (Japanese: 父ちゃんと相撲だゾ)	May 26, 2017
932	"Coin Laundry is Easy" (Japanese: コインランドリーはらくらくだゾ)	June 2, 2017
932	"Play with Your Neighbor’s Aunt" (Japanese: となりのおばさんちであそぶゾ)	June 2, 2017
933	"Get Sukiyaki" (Japanese: すき焼きをゲットだゾ)	June 9, 2017
933	"I Want to Save Luck" (Japanese: 運をためたいゾ)	June 9, 2017
934	"Find a Tutor" (Japanese: 家庭教師を探すゾ)	June 16, 2017
934	"Go to Dad" (Japanese: 父ちゃんをむかえにいくゾ)	June 16, 2017
935	"Walking on Your Behalf" (Japanese: 代理でウォーキングするゾ)	June 23, 2017
935	"Mysterious Procession" (Japanese: 謎の行列だゾ)	June 23, 2017
935	"Shiro’s Gorgeous House" (Japanese: シロのゴーカな家だゾ)	June 23, 2017
936	"Kasukabe Urban Legend Series Horror Elevator" (Japanese: カスカベ都市伝説シリーズ 恐怖のエレベーターだゾ)	June 30, 2017
936	"Trash Wars" (Japanese: ゴミ箱ウォーズだゾ)	June 30, 2017
937	"Jun Walk Has Arrived" (Japanese: じゅん散歩がやってきたゾ)	July 7, 2017
937	"My Scribble Room" (Japanese: オラのらくがき部屋だゾ)	July 7, 2017
938	"Mermaid Legend of Mystery (Parts 1 and 2)" (Japanese: ナゾの人魚伝説だゾ)	August 4, 2017
939	"A Penguin Arrived" (Japanese: ペンギンが来たゾ)	August 18, 2017
939	"Beaten Rabbit <Awakening>" (Japanese: なぐられうさぎ＜醒＞だゾ)	August 18, 2017
Shin-chan and his friends find a penguin in Shin's pool. They make friends with him and call him "Penkichi". / Nene-chan's stuffed rabbit comes to life again and possesses her and her mother.
940	"Make Ice Cream with Dad" (Japanese: 父ちゃんとアイスを作るゾ)	August 25, 2017
940	"Buriburizaemon in 3 Animals" (Japanese: 3匹のぶりぶりだゾ)	August 25, 2017
941	"Go to Eat New Soba" (Japanese: 新そばをたべに行くゾ)	September 8, 2017
941	"Hell Saleslady Again" (Japanese: またまた地獄のセールスレディだゾ)	September 8, 2017
942	"My Matsutake Conference" (Japanese: オラんちのマツタケ会議だゾ)	September 15, 2017
942	"Ai-chan is a Line" (Japanese: あいちゃんはひとすじだゾ)	September 15, 2017
943	"Salaryman Barbecue" (Japanese: サラリーマンバーベキューだゾ)	October 13, 2017
943	"Experience Dog Yoga" (Japanese: ドッグヨガを体験するゾ)	October 13, 2017
944	"Think of a Special Move" (Japanese: 必殺技を考えるゾ)	October 20, 2017
944	"Bo-chan’s Secret" (Japanese: ボーちゃんの秘密だゾ)	October 20, 2017
945	"We Ducks" (Japanese: オラたちアヒルだゾ)	October 27, 2017
945	"The Menu is the Same" (Japanese: メニューが一緒だゾ)	October 27, 2017
946	"The 1st Autumn Special Project! I’ve Been Assigned to Work Alone" (Japanese: 秋のスペシャル企画第1弾！単身赴任が決まったゾ)	November 3, 2017
946	"Get Through a Pinch" (Japanese: ピンチを切り抜けるゾ)	November 3, 2017
947	"Nene-chan’s Runaway" (Japanese: ネネちゃんの家出だゾ)	November 10, 2017
947	"Autumn Special Project Big Shinnosuke vs. Shin Godzilla" (Japanese: 秋の特別企画 しんのすけ対シン・ゴジラだゾ)	November 10, 2017
948	"Babysitter is Hard" (Japanese: ベビーシッターは大変だゾ)	November 17, 2017
948	"The 2nd Autumn Special Project! It’s Easy to Move Alone" (Japanese: 秋のスペシャル企画第2弾！単身赴任はお気楽だゾ)	November 17, 2017
949	"I Really Want to Eat Parfait" (Japanese: どうしてもパフェが食べたいゾ)	November 24, 2017
949	"The 3rd Autumn Special Project! I’m Thrilled to be Assigned to Work Alone" (Japanese: 秋のスペシャル企画第3弾！単身赴任はドキドキだゾ)	November 24, 2017
950	"Musae-chan and Cleaning" (Japanese: むさえちゃんと大掃除だゾ)	December 1, 2017
950	"Buriburizaemon’s Adventures Legendary Kutsu" (Japanese: ぶりぶりざえもんの冒険 伝説のクツ編)	December 1, 2017

== 2018 ==
No.	Title	Original release date
SPECIAL–81	"Match with Sealing" (Japanese: おシーリングで勝負だゾ)	January 7, 2018
SPECIAL–81	"Mom Helps" (Japanese: 母ちゃんがおたすけするゾ)	January 7, 2018
951	"With Nanako Sister and Mochi" (Japanese: ななこおねいさんとおもちつきだゾ)	January 12, 2018
951	"I Want to Collect Treasure" (Japanese: お宝をそろえたいゾ)	January 12, 2018
952	"Mystery at the Snow Festival (Front and Back)" (Japanese: 雪まつりでミステリーだゾ（前後編）)	January 19, 2018
953	"Frog Returns" (Japanese: カエルさん帰るだゾ)	January 26, 2018
953	"Everyone Has Shiro’s Walk" (Japanese: みんながシロの散歩だゾ)	January 26, 2018
954	"After All Winter is Kotatsu" (Japanese: 冬はやっぱりコタツだゾ)	February 2, 2018
954	"Stamp Rally" (Japanese: スタンプラリーだゾ)	February 2, 2018
955	"Thank You for Going to Get It" (Japanese: ありがた～いアレを取りに行くゾ)	February 9, 2018
955	"Longing for the Red Scorpion Corps" (Japanese: 紅さそり隊にあこがれるゾ)	February 9, 2018
956	"I Can’t Leave Kazama-kun" (Japanese: 風間くんと離れられないゾ)	February 16, 2018
956	"Do You Play with Dad on a Cold Day?" (Japanese: 寒い日は父ちゃんと遊ぶ？だゾ)	February 16, 2018
957	"Take a Photo of the Pamphlet" (Japanese: パンフレットの写真をとるゾ)	February 23, 2018
957	"Mom Who Wants to Apply Nail Polish" (Japanese: マニキュアを塗りたい母ちゃんだゾ)	February 23, 2018
SPECIAL–82	"I’m a Twin Panda Zookeeper" (Japanese: オラ、双子パンダの飼育係だゾ)	March 2, 2018
SPECIAL–82	"Crayon Shin-chan The Spring! It's a Movie! 3 Hour Anime Festival" (Japanese: 爆盛！のはらーめんだゾ)	March 2, 2018
SPECIAL–82	"Paper Planes That Fly Often" (Japanese: よく飛ぶ紙ひこうきだゾ)	March 2, 2018
958	"Challenge Food Lipo" (Japanese: 食リポに挑戦だゾ)	March 9, 2018
958	"I’ll Graduate" (Japanese: オラは卒業するゾ)	March 9, 2018
SPECIAL–83	"Crayon Shin-chan: Invasion!! Alien Shiriri (2017) (Director: Masakazu Hashimoto)" (Japanese: クレヨンしんちゃん 襲来!!宇宙人シリリ（2017年）（監督：橋本昌和）)	April 6, 2018
959	"Dad’s Smooth Hair" (Japanese: 父ちゃんのサラサラヘアーだゾ)	April 13, 2018
959	"Himawari Has Arrived" (Japanese: ひまわりが来ちゃったゾ)	April 13, 2018
960	"Parent and Child 3 Generation Sweets Trip" (Japanese: 親子三代スイーツの旅だゾ)	April 20, 2018
960	"Help Ageo-sensei" (Japanese: 上尾先生をおたすけするゾ)	April 20, 2018
961	"Collect Bread Stickers" (Japanese: パンのシールを集めるゾ)	April 27, 2018
961	"Transform into Action Mask" (Japanese: アクション仮面に変身だゾ)	April 27, 2018
962	"AI Robo Has Arrived" (Japanese: AIロボがやってきたゾ)	May 11, 2018
962	"Glamping at Me" (Japanese: オラんちでグランピングだゾ)	May 11, 2018
963	"Join Each Other in a Beam Picture" (Japanese: はり絵ではり合うゾ)	May 18, 2018
963	"I Was Entrusted with the Secretary" (Japanese: 幹事をまかされたゾ)	May 18, 2018
964	"Make a Bath" (Japanese: ふろくを作るゾ)	May 25, 2018
964	"I Want to See Kuroiso-san’s Real Face" (Japanese: 黒磯さんの素顔を見たいゾ)	May 25, 2018
965	"Challenge Smoking" (Japanese: くんせいにチャレンジするゾ)	June 1, 2018
965	"Pull a Cold and Tie" (Japanese: カゼをひいてタイクツだゾ)	June 1, 2018
966	"Dad’s Health Check" (Japanese: 父ちゃんの健康診断だゾ)	June 8, 2018
966	"Play with an Ostrich" (Japanese: ダチョウとたわむれるゾ)	June 8, 2018
967	"Miracle Dog Shiro" (Japanese: ミラクルドッグ・シロだゾ)	June 15, 2018
967	"Masao-kun’s “Address Period”" (Japanese: マサオくんの“当て期”だゾ)	June 15, 2018
968	"Grow Vegetables" (Japanese: 野菜を育てるゾ)	June 22, 2018
968	"Go to Borrow a DVD" (Japanese: DVDを借りにいくゾ)	June 22, 2018
969	"The Nohara Pudding Wars" (Japanese: 野原家プリンウォーズだゾ)	June 29, 2018
969	"A Defense Squad Meeting" (Japanese: 防衛隊の会議だゾ)	June 29, 2018
969	"Just Being Me" (Japanese: いつものオラだゾ)	June 29, 2018
970	"Soft Serve Ice Cream Is Delicious" (Japanese: ソフトクリームはおいしいゾ)	July 6, 2018
970	"Collecting Chore Points" (Japanese: お手伝いポイントを貯めるゾ)	July 6, 2018
970	"Me and Bo-chan" (Japanese: ボーちゃんとオラだゾ)	July 6, 2018
971	"Grab an Eel" (Japanese: うなぎのつかみどりだゾ)	July 20, 2018
971	"Summer Urban Legend Series I Made Friends" (Japanese: 夏の都市伝説シリーズ おともだちができたゾ)	July 20, 2018
972	"Summer is Gymnastics" (Japanese: 夏といえば体操だゾ)	July 27, 2018
972	"Summer Urban Legend Series Buses with Unknown Destinations" (Japanese: 夏の都市伝説シリーズ 行き先のわからないバスだゾ)	July 27, 2018
973	"Battle with Chickens" (Japanese: ニワトリとバトルだゾ)	August 3, 2018
973	"Summer Urban Legend Series Kyoff Fan" (Japanese: 夏の都市伝説シリーズ キョーフ扇風機だゾ)	August 3, 2018
974	"Hell Saleslady Again" (Japanese: まだまだ地獄のセールスレディだゾ)	August 17, 2018
974	"Ball Recapture Strategy" (Japanese: ボール奪還作戦だゾ)	August 17, 2018
975	"We're Goldfish" (Japanese: オラたち金魚だゾ)	August 24, 2018
975	"Buying New Underwear" (Japanese: おパンツを買いにいくゾ)	August 24, 2018
976	"I Want to Be Tall" (Japanese: 背が高くなりたいゾ)	August 31, 2018
976	"Do You Do This Homework?" (Japanese: この家事はダレがする？だゾ)	August 31, 2018
977	"Search for Persistant Taste" (Japanese: しつこいお味をさぐるゾ)	September 14, 2018
977	"Parent-child Marathon" (Japanese: 親子マラソンだゾ)	September 14, 2018
978	"I Don’t Have a TV" (Japanese: オラのうちにはテレビがないゾ)	October 19, 2018
978	"Scoop" (Japanese: スクープするゾ)	October 19, 2018
979	"Search for a Butt" (Japanese: おシリをさがすゾ)	October 26, 2018
979	"Ageo-sensei is Thrilled" (Japanese: 上尾先生をドキドキさせるゾ)	October 26, 2018
980	"Moe-P Wand is Wonderful" (Japanese: もえPステッキはステキだゾ)	November 2, 2018
980	"Kindergarten Pretend" (Japanese: 幼稚園ごっこだゾ)	November 2, 2018
981	"I Want to Sell It on My Smartphone" (Japanese: スマホで売りたいゾ)	November 9, 2018
981	"Aim for the Center!" (Japanese: センターをねらえ！だゾ)	November 9, 2018
982	"Help with Packing" (Japanese: 荷造りを手伝うゾ)	November 16, 2018
982	"Suddenly Grandpa" (Japanese: いきなりじいちゃんだゾ)	November 16, 2018
983	"Suddenly Another Grandpa" (Japanese: いきなりもうひとりのじいちゃんだゾ)	November 23, 2018
983	"Carry a Masterpiece" (Japanese: ケッサクを運ぶゾ)	November 23, 2018
984	"Super Hot! Roasted Sweet Potato Showdown" (Japanese: 激アツ！焼き芋対決だゾ)	November 30, 2018
984	"Play Table Tennis with Mom" (Japanese: 母ちゃんと卓球するゾ)	November 30, 2018
985	"Saving Action Kamen" (Japanese: アクション仮面をお助けするゾ)	December 14, 2018
985	"Ai-chan and Hot Pot" (Japanese: あいちゃんとお鍋だゾ)	December 14, 2018

== 2019 ==
No.	Title	Original release date
986	"Masao-kun’s House’s Floor Heating" (Japanese: マサオくんちの床暖房だゾ)	January 18, 2019
986	"Mochi-Selling Girl" (Japanese: モチ売りの少女だゾ)	January 18, 2019
987	"Build a Great Castle" (Japanese: すごいお城をつくるゾ)	January 25, 2019
987	"Organize the Closet" (Japanese: 押入れを整理するゾ)	January 25, 2019
988	"Bagworm Kazama-kun" (Japanese: みのむし風間くんだゾ)	February 8, 2019
988	"Family Restaurant Pretend" (Japanese: ファミレスごっこだゾ)	February 8, 2019
989	"Enjoy the Bath" (Japanese: お風呂を楽しむゾ)	February 15, 2019
989	"I Want to Eat Strawberries Deliciously" (Japanese: いちごをおいしく食べたいゾ)	February 15, 2019
990	"Free Time" (Japanese: ひまなオラだゾ)	February 22, 2019
990	"Hole-in-One at a Bargain" (Japanese: バーゲンでホールインワンだゾ)	February 22, 2019
990	"Dental Examination of Love" (Japanese: 恋の歯科検診だゾ)	February 22, 2019
SPECIAL–84	"It’s Been Replaced with Kazama-kun" (Japanese: 風間くんと入れ替わっちゃったゾ)	March 1, 2019
SPECIAL–84	"Nohara Family’s Treasure" (Japanese: 野原家の秘宝だゾ)	March 1, 2019
991	"Doya-kun of the River Otter" (Japanese: コツメカワウソのドーヤくんだゾ)	March 8, 2019
991	"Musae-chan Takes Care of Her" (Japanese: むさえちゃんが看病するゾ)	March 8, 2019
992	"Find Spring" (Japanese: 春をさがすゾ)	March 15, 2019
992	"Cherry-Blossom Viewing of the Defense Team" (Japanese: 防衛隊のお花見だゾ)	March 15, 2019
993	"Shiro and a Box" (Japanese: シロと箱だゾ)	April 5, 2019
993	"Trevi Ah" (Japanese: トレビあ〜んだゾ)	April 5, 2019
SPECIAL–85	"Crayon Shin-chan: Burst Serving! Kung Fu Boys ~Ramen Rebellion~ (2018) (Director: Wataru Takahashi)" (Japanese: クレヨンしんちゃん 爆盛!カンフーボーイズ〜拉麺大乱〜（2018年）（監督：高橋渉）)	April 14, 2019
994	"Pick Up Bamboo Shoots" (Japanese: タケノコをほりほりするゾ)	April 19, 2019
994	"I’m Koala Shinnosuke" (Japanese: オラ、コアラしんのすけだゾ)	April 19, 2019
SPECIAL–86	"Crayon Shin-chan: Intense Battle! Robo Dad Strikes Back (2014) (Director: Wataru Takahashi)" (Japanese: クレヨンしんちゃん ガチンコ!逆襲のロボとーちゃん（2014年）（監督：高橋渉）)	April 21, 2019
995	"Mackerel Can Survival" (Japanese: サバ缶サバイバルだゾ)	April 26, 2019
995	"Our Real Playhouse" (Japanese: オラたちのリアルおままごとだゾ)	April 26, 2019
996	"Cooking With Nanako Sister" (Japanese: ななこおねいさんとお料理だゾ)	May 10, 2019
996	"Kitty-chan vs. Buri-chan" (Japanese: キティちゃんVSブリィちゃんだゾ)	May 10, 2019
997	"Our Life Sugoroku" (Japanese: オラたちの人生スゴロクだゾ)	May 17, 2019
997	"The Man From Spain" (Japanese: スペインから来た男だゾ)	May 17, 2019
997	"Amazing Tower" (Japanese: スゴイ巨塔だゾ)	May 17, 2019
998	"The Direct Sales Office is Advantageous" (Japanese: 直売所はおトクだゾ)	May 31, 2019
998	"Dad’s Secret" (Japanese: 父ちゃんの隠しごとだゾ)	May 31, 2019
999	"Super Salaryman Public Bath" (Japanese: スーパーサラリーマン銭湯だゾ)	June 7, 2019
999	"Train Your Hips" (Japanese: おしりをきたえるゾ)	June 7, 2019
999	"Yuzuman Has Arrived" (Japanese: ゆずマンがきたゾ)	June 7, 2019
1000	"Head Spa Feels Good" (Japanese: ヘッドスパは気持ちいいゾ)	June 14, 2019
1000	"Yuzu Band Yuzu Has Arrived" (Japanese: ゆずがやってきたゾ)	June 14, 2019
1000	"Yuzuman is a Hero" (Japanese: ゆずマンはヒーローだゾ)	June 14, 2019
1001	"Find Me!" (Japanese: オラを探せ!だゾ)	June 21, 2019
1001	"Newborn Red Scorpion Corps" (Japanese: 新生・紅さそり隊だゾ)	June 21, 2019
1002	"Chase Himawari!" (Japanese: ひまわりを追え!だゾ)	June 28, 2019
1002	"Hell Saleslady Who Came to Kindergarten" (Japanese: 幼稚園に来た地獄のセールスレディだゾ)	June 28, 2019
1003	"Masao-kun is a Great Chef" (Japanese: マサオくんはすご腕シェフだゾ)	July 5, 2019
1003	"Ai-chan and the Beach" (Japanese: あいちゃんとビーチだゾ)	July 5, 2019
SPECIAL–87	"Potsuri and a Single House" (Japanese: ポツリと一軒家だゾ)	July 26, 2019
SPECIAL–87	"My Blunder" (Japanese: オラのぬけがらだゾ)	July 26, 2019
SPECIAL–87	"Mysterious Doghouse" (Japanese: 不思議なドッグハウスだゾ)	July 26, 2019
SPECIAL–87	"Grow Shiitake Mushrooms" (Japanese: シイタケを育てるゾ)	July 26, 2019
1004	"Car Wash with Dad" (Japanese: 父ちゃんと洗車だゾ)	August 2, 2019
1004	"Kazama-kun is a Summer Resort" (Japanese: 風間くんちは避暑地だゾ)	August 2, 2019
1004	"“Naked Boy” Has Arrived" (Japanese: 『裸の少年』がきたゾ)	August 2, 2019
1005	"The Ticket is Dangerous" (Japanese: その券はキケンだゾ)	August 9, 2019
1005	"Participate in a Dog Seminar" (Japanese: ドッグセミナーに参加だゾ)	August 9, 2019
1006	"Kazama-kun Who Can’t Go Home" (Japanese: 帰れない風間くんだゾ)	August 23, 2019
1006	"Enjoy Alone" (Japanese: ひとりで楽しむゾ)	August 23, 2019
1007	"My Work Style Reform" (Japanese: オラの働き方改革だゾ)	August 30, 2019
1007	"Mosquitoes" (Japanese: 蚊がプ～ンだゾ)	August 30, 2019
SPECIAL–88	"I’m Not Running Away from Home" (Japanese: 家出じゃないゾ 引っ越しだゾ)	September 13, 2019
SPECIAL–88	"I Want to Drink Tapioca Milk Tea" (Japanese: タピオカミルクティが飲みたいゾ)	September 13, 2019
SPECIAL–88	"Use with Masao-kun" (Japanese: マサオくんとおつかいだゾ)	September 13, 2019
SPECIAL–88	"Picking Up Chestnuts Together" (Japanese: みんなで栗拾いだゾ)	September 13, 2019
SPECIAL–88	"Himawari is Aiming" (Japanese: ひまわりが狙ってるゾ)	September 13, 2019
SPECIAL–88	"Next Saturday" (Japanese: 次回から土曜日だゾ)	September 13, 2019
Rebroadcasting–SPECIAL	"Nohara Family Buying a New Car Series ① The Car Broke (2016) <again>" (Japanese: 野原家新車を買うシリーズ① 車が壊れたゾ（2016年）〈再〉)	September 29, 2019
Rebroadcasting–SPECIAL	"Nohara Family Buying a New Car Series ② The Foreign Car is a Man’s Marron (2016) <again>" (Japanese: 野原家新車を買うシリーズ② 外車は男のマロンだゾ（2016年）〈再〉)	September 29, 2019
Rebroadcasting–SPECIAL	"Nohara Family Buying a New Car Series ③ Finally Buying a Car (2016) <again>" (Japanese: 野原家新車を買うシリーズ③ とうとう車を買うゾ（2016年）〈再〉)	September 29, 2019
Rebroadcasting–SPECIAL	"Dad is a Shaved Head (2016) <again>" (Japanese: 父ちゃんが坊主頭だゾ（2016年）〈再〉)	September 29, 2019
1008	"Reform" (Japanese: リフォームするゾ)	October 5, 2019
1008	"Impersonator" (Japanese: ものまね鬼だゾ)	October 5, 2019
1008	"Dice Train (2016) <again>" (Japanese: サイコロ電車だゾ（2016年）〈再〉)	October 5, 2019
1009	"Find Apple Juice" (Japanese: りんごジュースを探すゾ)	October 19, 2019
1009	"Space Probe Pretend" (Japanese: 宇宙探査機ごっこだゾ)	October 19, 2019
1009	"What’s Wrong with Nene-chan!? (2016) <again>" (Japanese: どうしたネネちゃん!?だゾ（2016年）〈再〉)	October 19, 2019
1009	"The Female of the Research Institute" (Japanese: 科捜研の女だゾ)	October 19, 2019
1010	"Cosplay Contest" (Japanese: コスプレコンテストだゾ)	October 26, 2019
1010	"Bath is a Battle (2016) <again>" (Japanese: お風呂は戦闘だゾ（2016年）〈再〉)	October 26, 2019
1011	"Shiro is a Hairball" (Japanese: シロが毛玉だゾ)	November 2, 2019
1011	"I Want to Get Up Early (2017) <again>" (Japanese: 早起きしてトクしたいゾ（2017年）〈再〉)	November 2, 2019
1011	"I Want to See the Glowing Pajamas" (Japanese: 光るパジャマが見たいゾ)	November 2, 2019
1012	"Feeling Like a Good Trip" (Japanese: いい旅いった気分だゾ)	November 9, 2019
1012	"Share a Snack (2016) <again>" (Japanese: おやつをシェアするゾ（2016年）〈再〉)	November 9, 2019
1012	"Fever with Conveyor Belt Sushi (2017) <again>" (Japanese: 回転寿司でフィーバーだゾ（2017年）〈再〉)	November 9, 2019
1012	"Doctor-X" (Japanese: Doctor-Xだゾ)	November 9, 2019
1013	"Make the Windows Shiny (2017: <again>" (Japanese: 窓をピカピカにするゾ（2017年）〈再〉)	November 16, 2019
1013	"Himawari Caught a Cold (2017) <again>" (Japanese: ひまわりがカゼをひいたゾ（2017年）〈再〉)	November 16, 2019
1013	"Follow the Wrapping Bus!" (Japanese: ラッピングバスを追え!だゾ)	November 16, 2019
1014	"I Want a New Pillow (2017) <again>" (Japanese: 新しい枕がほしいゾ（2017年）〈再〉)	November 23, 2019
1014	"Something is Missing" (Japanese: 何かが足りないゾ)	November 23, 2019
1014	"Gratin is Hot (2016) <again>" (Japanese: グラタンは熱～いゾ（2016年）〈再〉)	November 23, 2019
1015	"Weird 50-yen Coin" (Japanese: 変な50円玉だゾ)	November 30, 2019
1015	"Masao-kun is Annoying" (Japanese: マサオくんがめんどくさいゾ)	November 30, 2019
1015	"Himawari’s Scary Thing (2014) <again>" (Japanese: ひまわりの怖いものだゾ（2014年）〈再〉)	November 30, 2019
1016	"Life with Flowers" (Japanese: 花のある生活だゾ)	December 7, 2019
1016	"Nanako-sensei (2016) <again>" (Japanese: ななこ先生だゾ（2016年）〈再〉)	December 7, 2019
1016	"Where’s Daddy? (2015) <again>" (Japanese: 父ちゃんはど〜こだ?だゾ（2015年）〈再〉)	December 7, 2019
1017	"A Woman Who Throws Away His Mom (2015) <again>" (Japanese: 母ちゃんは捨てる女だゾ（2015年）〈再〉)	December 14, 2019
1017	"Kick Bike" (Japanese: キックなバイクだゾ)	December 14, 2019
1017	"Being Chased by Kazama-kun (2013) <again>" (Japanese: 風間くんに追われてるゾ（2013年）〈再〉)	December 14, 2019
1018	"Who Goes for Shiro’s Walk?" (Japanese: シロの散歩は誰が行く?だゾ)	December 21, 2019
1018	"Oyugi Meeting Preparation (2014) <again>" (Japanese: おゆうぎ会の準備だゾ（2014年）〈再〉)	December 21, 2019
1018	"My Quiz" (Japanese: オラんちクイズだゾ)	December 21, 2019
1019	"Going on a Drive at Night" (Japanese: 寝かしつけドライブだゾ)	December 28, 2019
1019	"Want to Hear a Rare Voice (2014) <again>" (Japanese: レアなボイスがききたいゾ（2014年）〈再〉)	December 28, 2019
1019	"The Cozy Hot Water Bottle (2015) <again>" (Japanese: 湯たんぽでぬくぬくだゾ（2015年）〈再〉)	December 28, 2019

== 2020 ==
No.	Title	Original release date
1020	"Love Triangle Baseball" (Japanese: 三角関係ベースボールだゾ)	January 11, 2020
1020	"Hiroshi Nohara’s Dragonfly (2012) <again>" (Japanese: トンボの野原ひろしだゾ（2012年）〈再〉)	January 11, 2020
1020	"Pants Story" (Japanese: おパンツストーリーだゾ)	January 11, 2020
1021	"3 Sisters of the Koyama Family" (Japanese: 小山家三姉妹だゾ)	January 18, 2020
1021	"Not Unraveling (2013) <again>" (Japanese: ほどけないゾ（2013年）〈再〉)	January 18, 2020
1021	"Running Combatants" (Japanese: 走る戦闘員だゾ)	January 18, 2020
1022	"I Want to Sneak Around" (Japanese: こっそり回したいゾ)	January 25, 2020
1022	"After All Siblings (2012) <again>" (Japanese: やっぱりきょうだいだゾ（2012年）〈再〉)	January 25, 2020
1022	"Passionate! Athletic Park (2013) <again>" (Japanese: 熱血!アスレチック公園だゾ（2013年）〈再〉)	January 25, 2020
1023	"Dropped a Lot of Money" (Japanese: 大金を落としたゾ)	February 1, 2020
1023	"Daddy’s Sunday (2012) <again>" (Japanese: 父ちゃんの日曜日だゾ（2012年）〈再〉)	February 1, 2020
1023	"Go Home While Doing Something" (Japanese: 何かしながら帰るゾ)	February 1, 2020
1024	"See the Continuation of the Dream" (Japanese: 夢のつづきを見るゾ)	February 8, 2020
1024	"Determining the Captain of the Defense Corps (2013) <again>" (Japanese: 防衛隊の隊長を決めるゾ（2013年）〈再〉)	February 8, 2020
1024	"Join the Extra" (Japanese: エキストラに参加するゾ)	February 8, 2020
1025	"Nohara Family’s Home Escape Strategy" (Japanese: 野原家脱出大作戦だゾ（2012年）〈再〉)	February 15, 2020
1025	"I Want to Eat Miso Butter Corn Ramen" (Japanese: みそバターコーンラーメンが食べたいゾ)	February 15, 2020
1025	"Himawari and My Bear’s Ears (2012) <again>" (Japanese: ひまわりと耳おれクマだゾ（2012年）〈再〉)	February 15, 2020
1026	"Hand-knitted Hat" (Japanese: 手編みのぼうしだゾ)	February 22, 2020
1026	"Pants Pinch (2012) <again>" (Japanese: ズボンがピンチだゾ（2012年）〈再〉)	February 22, 2020
1026	"Play with Ear Rugby" (Japanese: 耳フーラグビーで勝負だゾ)	February 22, 2020
1027	"I Don’t Like the Bath! (2016) <again>" (Japanese: お風呂はイヤイヤ!だゾ（2016年）〈再〉)	February 29, 2020
1027	"Red Scorpion Corps, Meat Bun Game" (Japanese: 紅さそり隊、肉まんで勝負だゾ)	February 29, 2020
1027	"Can Carry Wars (2012) <again>" (Japanese: 缶ケリウォーズだゾ（2012年）〈再〉)	February 29, 2020
1028	"I’m a Stamp Period" (Japanese: オラはハンコー期だゾ)	March 7, 2020
1028	"Get Ai-chan’s Lunch (2014) <again>" (Japanese: あいちゃんのお弁当をいただくゾ（2014年）〈再〉)	March 7, 2020
1028	"I Want to See Dad" (Japanese: 父ちゃんに会いたいゾ)	March 7, 2020
1029	"Diet Without Stiffness" (Japanese: こりずにダイエットだゾ)	March 14, 2020
1029	"Being Popular is Not the Same as Wood Inlay (2012) <again>" (Japanese: モテキじゃなくイレキだゾ（2012年）〈再〉)	March 14, 2020
1029	"I’m in Danger" (Japanese: オラんちが危機だゾ)	March 14, 2020
1030	"Time Strict" (Japanese: 時間にきびしいゾ)	March 21, 2020
1030	"Shiro and Change (2014) <again>" (Japanese: シロとチェンジだゾ（2014年）〈再〉)	March 21, 2020
1030	"Masao-kun Who Wants to Brag" (Japanese: 自慢したいマサオくんだゾ)	March 21, 2020
1031	"I Just Left My Smartphone" (Japanese: スマホを預けただけなのにだゾ)	March 28, 2020
1031	"Me, Sleeping by Myself (2012) <again>" (Japanese: オラ、ひとりで寝るゾ（2012年）〈再〉)	March 28, 2020
1031	"Library Without Love" (Japanese: 図書館ずラブだゾ)	March 28, 2020
1032	"Flower Mystery" (Japanese: お花ミステリーだゾ)	April 4, 2020
1032	"Masked Daddy (2012) <again>" (Japanese: 覆面父ちゃんだゾ（2012年）〈再〉)	April 4, 2020
1032	"I’m a Super Secretary" (Japanese: オラはスーパー秘書だゾ)	April 4, 2020
1033	"Large Cleaning at the Entrance (2011) <again>" (Japanese: 玄関の大そうじだゾ（2011年）〈再〉)	April 11, 2020
1033	"Trial The Doesn’t Reverse" (Japanese: 逆転しない裁判だゾ)	April 11, 2020
1033	"Discerning Coffee Shop (2011) <again>" (Japanese: こだわりのコーヒーショップだゾ（2011年）〈再〉)	April 11, 2020
1034	"Mommy’s BNP (2012) <again>" (Japanese: 母ちゃんはBNPだゾ（2012年）〈再〉)	April 18, 2020
1034	"I Don’t Want to Cry" (Japanese: 泣いちゃいや～んだゾ)	April 18, 2020
1034	"Washing the Curtain (2012) <again>" (Japanese: カーテンを洗っちゃうゾ（2012年）〈再〉)	April 18, 2020
Good–SP1	"Calling on the Internet (2015) <again>" (Japanese: インターネットでお電話するゾ（2015年）〈再〉)	April 25, 2020
Good–SP1	"Art While Sleeping (2016) <again>" (Japanese: 寝ている間にアートだゾ（2016年）〈再〉)	April 25, 2020
Good–SP1	"Play with Domino (2014) <again>" (Japanese: ドミノで遊ぶゾ（2014年）〈再〉)	April 25, 2020
Good–SP2	"A Visit to Daddy’s Office (1993) <again>" (Japanese: 父ちゃんの会社へ行くゾ（1993年）〈再〉)	May 2, 2020
Good–SP2	"Dad Has No Rest Even On a Sunday (2000) <again>" (Japanese: 父ちゃんは日曜も大変だゾ（2000年）〈再〉)	May 2, 2020
Good–SP2	"My Sushi Restaurant (2007) <again>" (Japanese: オラお寿司屋さんだゾ（2007年）〈再〉)	May 2, 2020
Good–SP3	"Roots of Roots of Roots (2014) <again>" (Japanese: ねのねのねだゾ（2014年）〈再〉)	May 9, 2020
Good–SP3	"Bo-chan has Become Anxious (2014) <again>" (Japanese: ボーちゃんが気になるゾ（2014年）〈再〉)	May 9, 2020
Good–SP3	"Searching for the Key of Friendship (2013) <again>" (Japanese: 友情の鍵探しだゾ（2013年）〈再〉)	May 9, 2020
1035	"Crayon Shin-chan" (Japanese: クレヨンしんちゃんだゾ)	May 16, 2020
1035	"I Don’t Have a TV (2018) <again>" (Japanese: オラのうちにはテレビがないゾ（2018年）〈再〉)	May 16, 2020
1035	"Erase Graffiti" (Japanese: ラクガキを消すゾ)	May 16, 2020
Good–SP4	"Thus the Young Couple Bought a House - Part one ・ Part two (2015) <again>" (Japanese: 若い二人はこうして家を買ったゾ（2015年）〈再〉)	May 23, 2020
Good–SP4	"It’s Hard to Go Out (2016) <again>" (Japanese: お出かけするのもひと苦労だゾ（2016年）〈再〉)	May 23, 2020
Good–SP5	"The Salayman’s Sinking Noodles (2012) <again>" (Japanese: 流しサラリーマンそうめんだゾ（2012年）〈再〉)	May 30, 2020
Good–SP5	"Curry Tournament of Dreams (2013) <again>" (Japanese: 夢のカレー大会だゾ（2013年）〈再〉)	May 30, 2020
Good–SP5	"Handmade Jiaozi (2013) <again>" (Japanese: 手作りギョーザだゾ（2013年）〈再〉)	May 30, 2020
Good–SP6	"Going to Father Farm (2014) <again>" (Japanese: ファザー牧場に行くゾ（2014年）〈再〉)	June 6, 2020
Good–SP6	"Seeing Chinango (2015) <again>" (Japanese: ちんあなごを見たいゾ（2015年）〈再〉)	June 6, 2020
Good–SP6	"The mobile zoo has come (2009) <again>" (Japanese: 移動動物園が来たゾ（2009年）〈再〉)	June 6, 2020
1036	"I Want to Eat at the Hotel Buffet" (Japanese: ホテルビュッフェで食べたいゾ)	June 13, 2020
1036	"Secret of Under the Floor (2015) <again>" (Japanese: 床下のヒミツだゾ（2015年）〈再〉)	June 13, 2020
1036	"Find a Dress" (Japanese: ワンピースを探すゾ)	June 13, 2020
1037	"Great Duel on Futon Island" (Japanese: ふとん島の大決闘だゾ)	June 20, 2020
1037	"Addicted to Skimmer (2012) <again>" (Japanese: スキマにはまったゾ（2012年）〈再〉)	June 20, 2020
1037	"Butt Talk" (Japanese: お尻がしゃべるゾ)	June 20, 2020
1038	"Watch Over the Solo Camp" (Japanese: ソロキャンプを見守るゾ)	June 27, 2020
1038	"The Umbrella is Full (2013) <again>" (Japanese: 傘がいっぱいだゾ（2013年）〈再〉)	June 27, 2020
1038	"Our Time Capsule" (Japanese: オラたちのタイムカプセルだゾ)	June 27, 2020
1039	"Hard Shopping" (Japanese: ハードなお買い物だゾ)	July 4, 2020
1039	"Soaked Encho-sensei" (Japanese: ずぶ濡れの園長先生だゾ)	July 4, 2020
1039	"Seeing the CM" (Japanese: CMが見たいゾ（2013年）〈再〉)	July 4, 2020
1040	"Tonight has Lots of Confusion (2012) <again>" (Japanese: 今夜はいろいろややこしいゾ（2012年）〈再〉)	July 11, 2020
1040	"Closet Nene-chan" (Japanese: 押し入れネネちゃんだゾ)	July 11, 2020
1040	"Grandpa Calling a Storm" (Japanese: 嵐を呼ぶおじいちゃんだゾ)	July 11, 2020
1041	"Go to Izuko for the Winning Cup" (Japanese: 優勝カップはいずこへだゾ)	July 18, 2020
1041	"Love Aquarium (2012) <again>" (Japanese: 恋する水族館だゾ（2012年）〈再〉)	July 18, 2020
1041	"Lunch in Front of Kasukabe Station" (Japanese: カスカベ駅前で昼食をだゾ)	July 18, 2020
1042	"Where is Father’s Fountain Pain? (2013) <again>" (Japanese: お父様の万年筆はどこ?だゾ（2013年）〈再〉)	July 25, 2020
1042	"Maze with Cardboard" (Japanese: ダンボールで迷路だゾ)	July 25, 2020
1042	"Dad Teleworks" (Japanese: 父ちゃんがテレワークだゾ)	July 25, 2020
1043	"Itchy Insects are Getting in the Way (2012) <again>" (Japanese: カユ〜イおジャマ虫だゾ（2012年）〈再〉)	August 1, 2020
1043	"I Want to Eat Candy Apples" (Japanese: りんごあめが食べたいゾ)	August 1, 2020
1043	"Run with Action Mask" (Japanese: アクション仮面と走るゾ)	August 1, 2020
1044	"Mom and Coin Laundry" (Japanese: 母ちゃんとコインランドリーだゾ)	August 8, 2020
1044	"Kindergarten Reviews" (Japanese: 幼稚園の口コミだゾ)	August 8, 2020
1044	"Shinnosuke the Taxi Driver (2016) <again>" (Japanese: タクシードライバーしんのすけだゾ（2016年）〈再〉)	August 8, 2020
1045	"Cooling a Watermelon (2013) <again>" (Japanese: スイカを冷やすゾ（2013年）〈再〉)	August 15, 2020
1045	"Tour a Girls’ School" (Japanese: 女子校を見学するゾ)	August 15, 2020
1045	"I Want to Eat Hamburger Steak" (Japanese: ハンバーグが食べたいゾ)	August 15, 2020
1046	"I Want a Room (2013) <again>" (Japanese: オラの部屋がほしいゾ（2013年）〈再〉)	August 22, 2020
1046	"One-Operated Bathing" (Japanese: ワンオペ入浴だゾ)	August 22, 2020
1046	"Kazama-kun’s Commitment" (Japanese: 風間くんのこだわりだゾ)	August 22, 2020
1047	"I Want to Hold Hands with Nanako Sister (2016) <again>" (Japanese: ななこおねいさんと手をつなぎたいゾ（2016年）〈再〉)	August 29, 2020
1047	"I’m a Witness" (Japanese: オラは目撃者だゾ)	August 29, 2020
1047	"Astronomical Observation on Summer Nights" (Japanese: 夏の夜は天体観測だゾ)	August 29, 2020
SPECIAL–89	"Crayon Shin-chan: Very Tasty! B-class Gourmet Survival!! (2013) (Director: Masakazu Hashimoto)" (Japanese: クレヨンしんちゃん バカうまっ!B級グルメサバイバル!!（2013年）（監督：橋本昌和）)	September 6, 2020
1048	"My Scribble Room (2017: <again>" (Japanese: オラのらくがき部屋だゾ（2017年）〈再〉)	September 12, 2020
1048	"Buriburizaemon’s Adventure Resurrection Demon King Bottle" (Japanese: ぶりぶりざえもんの冒険 復活の魔王瓶)	September 12, 2020
SPECIAL–90	"Crayon Shin-chan: Honeymoon Hurricane ~The Lost Hiroshi~ (2019) (Director: Masakazu Hashimoto)" (Japanese: クレヨンしんちゃん 新婚旅行ハリケーン 〜失われたひろし〜（2019年）（監督：橋本昌和）)	September 12, 2020
1049	"Ai-chan Appeals" (Japanese: あいちゃんがアピールだゾ)	September 19, 2020
1049	"Wandering Defense Corps (2014) <again>" (Japanese: さすらいの防衛隊だゾ（2014年）〈再〉)	September 19, 2020
1049	"Second Life is Buckwheat Noodles" (Japanese: セカンドライフはそば打ちだゾ)	September 19, 2020
1050	"The Return of P Man (2013) <again>" (Japanese: ピーマンを返すゾ（2013年）〈再〉)	September 26, 2020
1050	"Waiting for Me Together" (Japanese: みんなでオラ待ちだゾ)	September 26, 2020
1050	"Getting Up Early (2012) <again>" (Japanese: 早起きしちゃったゾ（2012年）〈再〉)	September 26, 2020
1051	"Help Excavation" (Japanese: 発掘をお助けするゾ)	October 3, 2020
1051	"I’m Worried About Ordering" (Japanese: お取り寄せで悩むゾ)	October 3, 2020
1051	"The Ice Cream of Friendship (2013) <again>" (Japanese: 友情のアイスだゾ（2013年）〈再〉)	October 3, 2020
1052	"Special Training for Shiro (2012) <again>" (Japanese: シロを特訓だゾ（2012年）〈再〉)	October 10, 2020
1052	"Shiro Got Fat (2016) <again>" (Japanese: シロが太っちゃったゾ（2016年）〈再〉)	October 10, 2020
1052	"It’s Super Shiro" (Japanese: SUPER SHIROだゾ)	October 10, 2020
1053	"Cooking Rice (2012) <again>" (Japanese: ごはんをたくゾ（2012年）〈再〉)	October 17, 2020
1053	"Kazama-kun is Lost" (Japanese: 風間くんが迷子だゾ)	October 17, 2020
1053	"Grandpa and Hell Saleslady" (Japanese: じいちゃんと地獄のセールスレディだゾ)	October 17, 2020
1054	"Game with Bucket Relay" (Japanese: バケツリレーで勝負だゾ)	October 24, 2020
1054	"Break Dad’s Abdominal Muscles" (Japanese: 父ちゃんの腹筋を割るゾ)	October 24, 2020
1054	"The Wolf Man in Kasukabe (2012) <again>" (Japanese: 狼男カスカベだゾ（2012年）〈再〉)	October 24, 2020
1055	"It Involves His Manliness (2016) <again>" (Japanese: 男の沽券にかかわるゾ（2016年）〈再〉)	October 31, 2020
1055	"Compete for Mom" (Japanese: 母ちゃんをとりあうゾ)	October 31, 2020
1055	"Pick a Bag (2015) <again>" (Japanese: バッグを拾ったゾ（2015年）〈再〉)	October 31, 2020
1056	"Wearing (2015) <again>" (Japanese: かぶってるゾ（2015年）〈再〉)	November 7, 2020
1056	"Phantom is Hard" (Japanese: 怪人はつらいゾ)	November 7, 2020
1056	"The Sitting Chair is Nice" (Japanese: 座椅子はいいっスねだゾ)	November 7, 2020
1056	"We’re Ketsumeishi" (Japanese: オラたちケツメイシ（ン）だゾ)	November 7, 2020
1057	"Make a Dream Café (2013) <again>" (Japanese: 夢のカフェをつくるゾ（2013年）〈再〉)	November 14, 2020
1057	"Indirect Lighting" (Japanese: 間接照明でキメるゾ)	November 14, 2020
1057	"I’m a Fashion Leader (2016) <again>" (Japanese: オラはファッションリーダーだゾ（2016年）〈再〉)	November 14, 2020
1058	"Be Careful of Borrowing" (Japanese: 借りパク注意だゾ)	November 21, 2020
1058	"Change Wallpaper" (Japanese: 壁紙をはりかえるゾ)	November 21, 2020
1058	"Road Safety Warrior in Love (2015) <again>" (Japanese: 恋の交通安全戦士だゾ（2015年）〈再〉)	November 21, 2020
1059	"Dad’s Husband for the Time Being (2016) <again>" (Japanese: 父ちゃんのとりあえず主夫だゾ（2016年）〈再〉)	November 28, 2020
1059	"Daddy Doesn’t Have Sunday (2014) <again>" (Japanese: 父ちゃんの日曜はツイてないゾ（2014年）〈再〉)	November 28, 2020
1059	"Eco Bag is Important" (Japanese: エコバッグは大事だゾ)	November 28, 2020
1060	"Who Angered Encho-sensei? (2013) <again>" (Japanese: 園長先生を怒らせたのは誰?だゾ（2013年）〈再〉)	December 5, 2020
1060	"Toilet Reform" (Japanese: トイレのリフォームだゾ)	December 5, 2020
1060	"If Found, It’s Over" (Japanese: 見つかったら終わりだゾ)	December 5, 2020
1061	"Daddy and Correspondance (2012) <again>" (Japanese: 父ちゃんとブンツーだゾ（2012年）〈再〉)	December 12, 2020
1061	"Fashionable Bancho" (Japanese: オシャレ番長だゾ)	December 12, 2020
1061	"Musae-chan Treats Me" (Japanese: むさえちゃんにおごられるゾ)	December 12, 2020
1062	"Our Hazard Map (2016) <again>" (Japanese: オラたちのハザードマップだゾ（2016年）〈再〉)	December 19, 2020
1062	"Pounding Mom" (Japanese: ドキドキ母ちゃんだゾ)	December 19, 2020
1062	"Ai’s Crash Landing" (Japanese: あいの不時着だゾ)	December 19, 2020
1063	"Housecleaning is Noisy (2013) <again>" (Japanese: 大そうじはバタバタだゾ（2013年）〈再〉)	December 26, 2020
1063	"Beard is Also Evil Dad" (Japanese: ヒゲモジャ父ちゃんだゾ)	December 26, 2020
1063	(Japanese: 分身の術を練習するゾ)	December 26, 2020

== 2021 ==
No.	Title	Original release date
1064	"Dancing Mommy Number 29 (2015) <again>" (Japanese: アゲアゲ母ちゃん29号だゾ（2015年）〈再〉)	January 9, 2021
1064	"Nanako Sister and Hairdressing Shop" (Japanese: ななこおねいさんと美容院だゾ)	January 9, 2021
1064	"Compete for Channels" (Japanese: チャンネルを争うゾ)	January 9, 2021
1065	"Bazzar in kindergarten (2009) <again>" (Japanese: 幼稚園でバザーだゾ（2009年）〈再〉)	January 16, 2021
1065	"Dad’s Love Love Hospitalization" (Japanese: 父ちゃんのラブラブ入院だゾ)	January 16, 2021
1065	"Transceiver is Confusing" (Japanese: トランシーバーがややこしいゾ)	January 16, 2021
1066	"Suspicion!? Daddy’s Photo (2015) <again>" (Japanese: 疑惑!?父ちゃんの写真だゾ（2015年）〈再〉)	January 23, 2021
1066	"Oden Party" (Japanese: おでんパーティだゾ)	January 23, 2021
1066	"Go to See the Sunset" (Japanese: 夕日を見に行くゾ)	January 23, 2021
1067	"Put on Dad’s Shoes" (Japanese: 父ちゃんのおクツをはくゾ)	January 30, 2021
1067	"Classroom Footrace (2014) <again>" (Japanese: かけっこ教室だゾ（2014年）〈再〉)	January 30, 2021
1067	"Shirobo Has Arrived" (Japanese: シロボがやってきたゾ)	January 30, 2021
1068	"Chase Nene-chan’s Eco Bag! (2014) <again>" (Japanese: ネネちゃんのエコバッグを追え!だゾ（2014年）〈再〉)	February 6, 2021
1068	"Pea Sprouts Grow" (Japanese: 豆苗が育つゾ)	February 6, 2021
1068	"Roll with a Big Ball" (Japanese: 大玉でころがるゾ)	February 6, 2021
1069	"Kazama-kun and Shopping (2015) <again>" (Japanese: 風間くんとおつかいだゾ（2015年）〈再〉)	February 13, 2021
1069	"Side Dish Treasure Hunt" (Japanese: おかずお宝さがしだゾ)	February 13, 2021
1069	"Pull the Tablecloth" (Japanese: テーブルクロスを引くゾ)	February 13, 2021
1069	"“Nijiiro Carte”" (Japanese: 「にじいろカルテ」だゾ)	February 13, 2021
1070	"Chikuwa That Sees the Future" (Japanese: 未来が見えるちくわだゾ)	February 20, 2021
1070	"Today is Cold (2013) <again>" (Japanese: 今日は寒～いゾ（2013年）〈再〉)	February 20, 2021
1070	"Encho-sensei’s Ventriloquism" (Japanese: 園長先生の腹話術だゾ)	February 20, 2021
1071	"Dream Home" (Japanese: 夢のマイホームだゾ)	February 27, 2021
1071	"Calligraphy is Fun" (Japanese: 書道は楽しいゾ)	February 27, 2021
1071	"Adult Pants" (Japanese: おとなのおパンツだゾ)	February 27, 2021
1072	"Clean up the cardboard" (Japanese: 段ボールを片付けるゾ)	March 6, 2021
1072	"I'm a bad director" (Japanese: クドい演出家だゾ)	March 6, 2021
1072	"Stupid first story Primitive era mammoth hunting" (Japanese: おバカはじめて物語 原始時代編 マンモス狩りだゾ)	March 6, 2021
1073	"Luxury Cake Shop" (Japanese: 高級ケーキ屋さんだゾ)	March 13, 2021
1073	"Reproduced Mom" (Japanese: 母ちゃんを再現するゾ)	March 13, 2021
1073	"Stupid First Story Primitive Era I Want to Eat Fish" (Japanese: おバカはじめて物語 原始時代編 魚が食べたいゾ)	March 13, 2021
1074	"Ask a Shooting Star" (Japanese: 流れ星にお願いするゾ)	March 20, 2021
1074	"Buriburizaemon’s Adventure Beauty, the Beast and Me" (Japanese: ぶりぶりざえもんの冒険 美女と野獣とオラだゾ)	March 20, 2021
1075	"The Secret Room is Paradise" (Japanese: 秘密の部屋はパラダイスだゾ)	March 27, 2021
1075	"Making Fish" (Japanese: おさかなを作るゾ)	March 27, 2021
1075	"Primitive Era Edition Various Story" (Japanese: おバカはじめて物語 原始時代編 いろんなおバカだゾ)	March 27, 2021
1076	"I can't Enter The House" (Japanese: 家に入れないゾ)	April 3, 2021
1076	"Action Kamen Stamps" (Japanese: アクション仮面切手をはるゾ)	April 3, 2021
1076	"Primitive Era Edition Ai-chan wants Honey" (Japanese: おバカはじめて物語 原始時代編 あいちゃんが好きだゾ)	April 3, 2021
1077	"Misae wants to Drive Somewhere" (Japanese: 出たとこドライブだゾ)	April 10, 2021
1077	"I can't Remember Kazama-kun" (Japanese: 思い出せない風間くん)	April 10, 2021
1077	"Shiritsu Detective Shinnosuke's Case File No. 1 The Mystery of the Missing Black Cat" (Japanese: シリつ探偵しんのすけの事件ファイルNo. 1 消えた黒猫の謎)	April 10, 2021
1078	"Encho-sensei’s Misfortune" (Japanese: 園長先生の災難だゾ)	April 17, 2021
1078	"Loss" (Japanese: ロスだゾ)	April 17, 2021
1078	"Shiritsu Detective Shinnosuke's Case File No. 2 Challenge from the Phantom Thief" (Japanese: シリつ探偵しんのすけの事件ファイルNo. 2 怪盗からの挑戦状)	April 17, 2021
1079	"Power up with false eyelashes" (Japanese: つけまつげでパワーアップだゾ)	April 24, 2021
1079	"Shiritsu Detective Shinnosuke's Case File No. 3 Suspect B's Sil" (Japanese: シリつ探偵しんのすけの事件ファイルNo. 3 容疑者Bの沈黙)	April 24, 2021
1079	"Macaroni Empitsu Shin-chan" (Japanese: マカロニえんぴつしんちゃんだゾ)	April 24, 2021
1080	"Apply for the Sweepstakes" (Japanese: 懸賞に応募するゾ)	May 1, 2021
1080	"Shiritsu Detective Shinnosuke's Case File No. 4 Targeted Bachelor (front and back)" (Japanese: シリつ探偵しんのすけの事件ファイルNo. 4 狙われたバチェラー（前後編）)	May 1, 2021
1081	"Compressing a futon (2013) <again>" (Japanese: 布団を圧縮するゾ （2013年）〈再〉)	May 8, 2021
1081	"I can't go home until I eat a snack" (Japanese: おやつを食べるまで帰れませんだゾ)	May 8, 2021
1081	"It's 4D at home" (Japanese: おうちで4Dだゾ)	May 8, 2021
1082	"Make a business card" (Japanese: 名刺を作るゾ)	May 15, 2021
1082	"Delusion" (Japanese: 妄想するゾ)	May 15, 2021
1082	"I don't want to be afraid" (Japanese: あやまりたくないオラだゾ)	May 15, 2021
1083	"Dad is Working Out (2010) <again>" (Japanese: フィットネス父ちゃんだゾ)	May 22, 2021
1083	"I don't like fights" (Japanese: ケンカはイヤ～ンだゾ)	May 22, 2021
1083	"I remember my password" (Japanese: パスワードを思い出すゾ)	May 22, 2021
1084	"A lot of flowers big strategy (2011) <again>" (Japanese: 花いっぱい大作戦だゾ（2011年）〈再〉)	May 29, 2021
1084	"Sorting the condiments" (Japanese: 調味料を仕分けるゾ)	May 29, 2021
1084	"It's Ai-chan who wants to synchronize" (Japanese: シンクロしたいあいちゃんだゾ)	May 29, 2021
1085	"I know the difference" (Japanese: ちがいのわかるオラだゾ)	June 5, 2021
1085	"The zoo is Uki Wooky (2015) <again>" (Japanese: 動物園はウキウッキーだゾ（2015年）〈再〉)	June 5, 2021
1086	(Japanese: ラテアートに挑戦するゾ)	June 12, 2021
1086	(Japanese: 潮干狩りへゴー！だゾ（2013年）〈再)	June 12, 2021
1086	(Japanese: 猫なオラたちだゾ)	June 12, 2021
