= Tonari no bangohan =

Japanese reality television series

Totsugeki! Tonari no Bangohan (突撃!隣の晩ごはん; "Breaking into neighbor's dinner") is a Japanese TV reality show. Each episode centers on its host, Yonesuke (1948, April 15 -), who walks door-to-door and, without much introduction, invites himself into unsuspecting residents' homes. His goal is to find out what each family is eating for dinner.

== A typical episode ==
The situation is often humorous because the Yonesuke invites himself into homes, using only the phrase, "Tonari no Bangohan!" to introduce his presence. Despite the fact that no appearances are ever scheduled ahead of time, because the show is well known, and because Yonesuke is so famous in Japan, most people are willing to invite him in. Most home-owners are visibly quite surprised that a TV personality is at their doorstep. He generally visits a number of homes in a single location during an episode.

Yonesuke, who always carries a large Shamoji paddle with him, on which is written the name of the show, usually steps right into the kitchen, another faux pas in Japanese homes, and begins to ask what they're eating and cracks jokes the whole time. He makes it a point to join the family for dinner. Or, if they've already finished, to sample the leftovers. At the end of his very short visit, Yonesuke always recommends one main dish from the various dinner dishes of the day.
